= 2015 Ağrı Challenger – Singles =

Singles
- 2015 Ağrı Challenger

Final
- Champion: (Uzbekistan) Farrukh Dustov
- Runner-up: (India) Saketh Myneni
- Score: 6–4, 6–4

Events
Singles	Doubles
Ağrı Challenger

This was the first edition of the tournament. Farrukh Dustov won the title by beating Saketh Myneni in the final, 6–4, 6–4.

== Seeds ==
1. (Belgium) Ruben Bemelmans (quarterfinals)
2. (Tunisia) Malek Jaziri (withdrew due to a right ankle injury)
3. (Russia) Evgeny Donskoy (quarterfinals)
4. (Bosnia and Herzegovina) Mirza Bašić (quarterfinals)
5. (Russia) Konstantin Kravchuk (semifinals)
6. (Uzbekistan) Farrukh Dustov (champion)
7. (Russia) Aslan Karatsev (second round)
8. (India) Saketh Myneni (final)

== Draw ==
=== Key ===
- Q = Qualifier
- WC = Wild card
- LL = Lucky loser
- Alt = Alternate
- SE = Special exempt
- PR = Protected ranking
- ITF = ITF entry
- JE = Junior exempt
- w/o = Walkover
- r = Retired
- d = Defaulted
- SR = Special ranking

=== Finals ===
Semifinals
5	(Russia) Konstantin Kravchuk	6^{4}	2
6	(Uzbekistan) Farrukh Dustov	7^{7}	6
8	(India) Saketh Myneni	6	3	7^{7}
(Ukraine) Denys Molchanov	3	6	6^{1}

Final
6	(Uzbekistan) Farrukh Dustov	6	6
8	(India) Saketh Myneni	4	4

=== Top half ===
First round
1	(Belgium) R Bemelmans	6	6
SE	(Romania) P-A Luncanu	2	2
(Serbia) Ivan Bjelica	3	6	6
(Turkey) C İlkel	6	3	4
(Bosnia and Herzegovina) A Šetkić	6	6
PR	(Croatia) A Pavić	2	3
WC	(Turkey) A Yüksel	6^{5}	5
5	(Russia) K Kravchuk	7^{7}	7
4	(Bosnia and Herzegovina) M Bašić	7^{7}	6
WC	(Turkey) Muhammet Haylaz	6^{5}	4
Q	(Turkey) A Çelikbilek	6	6
WC	(Turkey) B Ergüden	3	4
(Lithuania) L Grigelis	6	6
Q	(Turkey) S Ağabigün	1	4
(Austria) M Neuchrist	4	4
6	(Uzbekistan) F Dustov	6	6

Second round
1	(Belgium) R Bemelmans	6	6
(Serbia) I Bjelica	2	1
(Bosnia and Herzegovina) A Šetkić	6^{0}	7^{7}	2
5	(Russia) K Kravchuk	7^{7}	6^{4}	6
4	(Bosnia and Herzegovina) M Bašić	6	6
Q	(Turkey) A Çelikbilek	4	2
(Lithuania) L Grigelis	2	6^{5}
6	(Uzbekistan) F Dustov	6	7^{7}

Quarterfinals
1	(Belgium) R Bemelmans	3	4
5	(Russia) K Kravchuk	6	6
4	(Bosnia and Herzegovina) M Bašić	2	4
6	(Uzbekistan) F Dustov	6	6

Semifinals
5	(Russia) K Kravchuk	6^{4}	2
6	(Uzbekistan) F Dustov	7^{7}	6

=== Bottom half ===
First round
8	(India) S Myneni	7	6
(Croatia) M Pecotić	5	1
Q	(Russia) Fedor Chervyakov	6	7^{7}
(Germany) R Becker	3	6^{3}
(Italy) R Bellotti	2	3
(Russia) Alexandr Igoshin	6	6
(Croatia) N Mektić	4	6	5
3	(Russia) E Donskoy	6	3	7
7	(Russia) A Karatsev	6	7
Q	(Lithuania) L Mugevičius	2	5
(Ukraine) D Molchanov	7^{7}	7^{7}
(Belarus) Y Shyla	6^{2}	6^{3}
(Austria) D Novak	6	6
WC	(India) D Sharan	3	2
(Czech Republic) Michal Konecny	6	6
LL	(Belarus) Yahor Yatsyk	2	2

Second round
8	(India) S Myneni	6	6
Q	(Russia) F Chervyakov	2	1
(Russia) A Igoshin	6	5	1
3	(Russia) E Donskoy	4	7	6
7	(Russia) A Karatsev	3	6^{5}
(Ukraine) D Molchanov	6	7^{7}
(Austria) D Novak	6	6
(Czech Republic) M Konecny	4	3

Quarterfinals
8	(India) S Myneni	7^{7}	6
3	(Russia) E Donskoy	6^{5}	4
(Ukraine) D Molchanov	7^{7}	6
(Austria) D Novak	6^{4}	2

Semifinals
8	(India) S Myneni	6	3	7^{7}
(Ukraine) D Molchanov	3	6	6^{1}
