= 2015 Ağrı Challenger =

- Date: 28 September – 4 October
- Edition: 1st
- Surface: Clay
- Location: Ağrı, Turkey

Champions

Singles
- (Uzbekistan) Farrukh Dustov

Doubles
- (Russia) Konstantin Kravchuk / (Ukraine) Denys Molchanov
Ağrı Challenger	· 2016 →

The 2015 Ağrı Challenger was a professional tennis tournament played on hard courts. It was the first edition of the tournament which was part of the 2015 ATP Challenger Tour. It took place in Ağrı, Turkey between 28 September and 4 October 2015.

== Singles main-draw entrants ==
=== Seeds ===
Country	Player	Rank^{1}	Seed
BEL	Ruben Bemelmans	85	1
TUN	~~Malek Jaziri~~	~~92~~	~~2~~
RUS	Evgeny Donskoy	117	3
BIH	Mirza Bašić	147	4
RUS	Konstantin Kravchuk	151	5
UZB	Farrukh Dustov	158	6
RUS	Aslan Karatsev	189	7
IND	Saketh Myneni	199	8

- ^{1} Rankings are as of September 21, 2015.

=== Other entrants ===
The following players received wildcards into the singles main draw:

- (Turkey) Anıl Yüksel
- (Turkey) Barış Ergüden
- (India) Divij Sharan
- (Turkey) Muhammet Haylaz

The following players received entry from the qualifying draw:

- (Turkey) Altuğ Çelikbilek
- (Russia) Fedor Chervyakov
- (Lithuania) Lukas Mugevicius
- (Turkey) Sarp Ağabigün

The following player received entry as a protected ranking into the singles main draw:

- (Croatia) Ante Pavić

The following players received entry as a lucky loser into the singles main draw:

- (Belarus) Yahor Yatsyk

The following player received entry as a special exempt into the singles main draw:

- (Romania) Petru-Alexandru Luncanu

=== Withdrawals ===
The following players were accepted directly into the main tournament but withdrew.

- (Tunisia) Malek Jaziri (right ankle)→ replaced by (Belarus) Yahor Yatsyk

== Champions ==
=== Singles ===
- (Uzbekistan) Farrukh Dustov def. (India) Saketh Myneni, 6–4, 6–4

=== Doubles ===
- (Russia) Konstantin Kravchuk / (Ukraine) Denys Molchanov def. (Russia) Alexandr Igoshin / (Belarus) Yaraslav Shyla, 6–3, 7–6^{(7–4)}
