= 2015 Ağrı Challenger – Doubles =

Doubles
- 2015 Ağrı Challenger

Final
- Champion: (Russia) Konstantin Kravchuk (Ukraine) Denys Molchanov
- Runner-up: (Russia) Alexandr Igoshin (Belarus) Yaraslav Shyla
- Score: 6–3, 7–6^{(7–4)}

Events
Singles	Doubles
- Ağrı Challenger

This was the first edition of the tournament.
Top seeds Konstantin Kravchuk and Denys Molchanov won the title by defeating Alexandr Igoshin and Yaraslav Shyla in the final, 6–3, 7–6^{(7–4)}.

== Seeds ==
1. (Russia) Konstantin Kravchuk / (Ukraine) Denys Molchanov (champion)
2. (India) Saketh Myneni / (India) Divij Sharan (semifinals)
3. (India) Jeevan Nedunchezhiyan / (United States) Matt Seeberger (quarterfinals)
4. (Lithuania) Laurynas Grigelis / (Lithuania) Lukas Mugevičius (semifinals, withdrew)

== Draw ==
Key

- Q = Qualifier
- WC = Wild card
- LL = Lucky loser
- Alt = Alternate
- ITF = ITF entry
- PR = Protected ranking
- SR = Special ranking
- SE = Special exempt
- JE = Junior exempt
- JR = Junior Accelerator Programme entrant
- CO = College Accelerator Programme entrant
- NG = Next Gen Accelerator Program entrant
- w/o = Walkover
- r = Retired
- d = Defaulted

First round
1	(Russia) K Kravchuk (Ukraine) D Molchanov	7^{7}	6
(Turkey) B Ergüden (Turkey) A Yüksel	6^{3}	0
(Czech Republic) Michal Konecny (Austria) M Neuchrist	6	6
WC	(Turkey) Durukan Turmus (Russia) Ilia Pozakov	2	3
4	(Lithuania) L Grigelis (Lithuania) L Mugevičius	6	6
(Croatia) N Mektić (Croatia) A Pavić	4	3
(Turkey) A Çelikbilek (Turkey) C İlkel	6^{4}	6	[11]
(Turkey) T Altuna (Germany) R Becker	7^{7}	4	[13]
(Russia) Alexandr Igoshin (Belarus) Y Shyla	7^{7}	6
(Italy) R Bellotti (Austria) D Novak	6^{3}	4
WC	(Romania) P-A Luncanu (Belarus) Yahor Yatsyk	4	6^{0}
3	(India) J Nedunchezhiyan (United States) M Seeberger	6	7^{7}
WC	(Turkey) S Ağabigün (Turkey) Muhammet Haylaz	4	4
(Serbia) Ivan Bjelica (Uzbekistan) F Dustov	6	6
(Russia) A Karatsev (Bosnia and Herzegovina) A Šetkić	5	2
2	(India) S Myneni (India) D Sharan	7	6

Quarterfinals
1	(Russia) K Kravchuk (Ukraine) D Molchanov	6	7^{12}
(Czech Republic) M Konecny (Austria) M Neuchrist	2	6^{10}
4	(Lithuania) L Grigelis (Lithuania) L Mugevičius	7	6
(Turkey) T Altuna (Germany) R Becker	5	3
(Russia) A Igoshin (Belarus) Y Shyla	3	6	[10]
3	(India) J Nedunchezhiyan (United States) M Seeberger	6	3	[5]
(Serbia) I Bjelica (Uzbekistan) F Dustov	6^{4}	6	[8]
2	(India) S Myneni (India) D Sharan	7^{7}	3	[10]

Semifinals
1	(Russia) K Kravchuk (Ukraine) D Molchanov	w/o
4	(Lithuania) L Grigelis (Lithuania) L Mugevičius
(Russia) A Igoshin (Belarus) Y Shyla	6	3	[11]
2	(India) S Myneni (India) D Sharan	4	6	[9]

Final
1	(Russia) K Kravchuk (Ukraine) D Molchanov	6	7^{7}
(Russia) A Igoshin (Belarus) Y Shyla	3	6^{4}
