= 2015 Batman Cup – Singles =

Singles
- 2015 Batman Cup

Final
- Champion: (Israel) Dudi Sela
- Runner-up: (Slovenia) Blaž Kavčič
- Score: 6–7^{(5–7)}, 6–3, 6–3

Events
Singles	Doubles
Batman Cup	· 2016 →

This is the first edition of the tournament.

Dudi Sela defeated Blaž Kavčič in the final, 6–7^{(5–7)}, 6–3, 6–3, to win the title.

== Seeds ==
1. (Slovenia) Blaž Kavčič (final)
2. (Israel) Dudi Sela (champion)
3. (Kazakhstan) Aleksandr Nedovyesov (second round, retired)
4. (Russia) Alexander Kudryavtsev (second round)
5. (Moldova) Radu Albot (quarterfinals)
6. (Belgium) Niels Desein (second round)
7. (Japan) Hiroki Moriya (semifinals)
8. (Russia) Konstantin Kravchuk (first round)

== Draw ==
=== Key ===
- Q = Qualifier
- WC = Wild card
- LL = Lucky loser
- Alt = Alternate
- SE = Special exempt
- PR = Protected ranking
- ITF = ITF entry
- JE = Junior exempt
- w/o = Walkover
- r = Retired
- d = Defaulted
- SR = Special ranking

=== Finals ===
Semifinals
1	(Slovenia) Blaž Kavčič	6	6
7	(Japan) Hiroki Moriya	1	0
(India) Saketh Myneni	4	3
2	(Israel) Dudi Sela	6	6

Final
1	(Slovenia) Blaž Kavčič	7^{7}	3	3
2	(Israel) Dudi Sela	6^{5}	6	6

=== Top half ===
First round
1	(Slovenia) B Kavčič	7	4	6
(Belarus) E Gerasimov	5	6	3
WC	(Turkey) A Yüksel	4	0
(Bulgaria) D Kuzmanov	6	6
WC	(Turkey) B Ergüden	4	6^{3}
(India) R Ramanathan	6	7^{7}
WC	(Turkey) Barkın Yalçınkale	5	3
5	(Moldova) R Albot	7	6
4	(Russia) A Kudryavtsev	6	6
(Turkey) C İlkel	2	1
(Lithuania) L Grigelis	0	3
(Australia) M Ebden	6	6
(Belarus) Y Shyla	6	6
Q	(Italy) R Ghedin	4	1
WC	(Turkey) A Çelikbilek	5	6^{1}
7	(Japan) H Moriya	7	7^{7}

Second round
1	(Slovenia) B Kavčič	7^{7}	6
(Bulgaria) D Kuzmanov	6^{4}	2
(India) R Ramanathan	6^{3}	5
5	(Moldova) R Albot	7^{7}	7
4	(Russia) A Kudryavtsev	3	3
(Australia) M Ebden	6	6
(Belarus) Y Shyla	3	6	0
7	(Japan) H Moriya	6	4	6

Quarterfinals
1	(Slovenia) B Kavčič	6	6
5	(Moldova) R Albot	3	0
(Australia) M Ebden	2	4
7	(Japan) H Moriya	6	6

Semifinals
1	(Slovenia) B Kavčič	6	6
7	(Japan) H Moriya	1	0

=== Bottom half ===
First round
8	(Russia) K Kravchuk	4	6^{3}
(Russia) A Karatsev	6	7^{7}
(Russia) E Donskoy	7^{7}	4	4
(Serbia) N Milojević	6^{5}	6	6
Q	(Georgia (country)) A Metreveli	2	3
(India) S Myneni	6	6
(Bulgaria) A Lazov	4	5
3	(Kazakhstan) A Nedovyesov	6	7
6	(Belgium) N Desein	6	1	7^{8}
Q	(New Zealand) M Venus	4	6	6^{6}
(Bosnia and Herzegovina) T Brkić	0	4
(Bosnia and Herzegovina) M Bašić	6	6
(Slovakia) I Klec	7	3	5
Q	(Lithuania) L Mugevičius	5	6	7
(Ukraine) D Molchanov	3	4
2	(Israel) D Sela	6	6

Second round
(Russia) A Karatsev	6	5	4
(Serbia) N Milojević	3	7	6
(India) S Myneni	5
3	(Kazakhstan) A Nedovyesov	1^{r}
6	(Belgium) N Desein	6^{4}	4
(Bosnia and Herzegovina) M Bašić	7^{7}	6
Q	(Lithuania) L Mugevičius	2	1
2	(Israel) D Sela	6	6

Quarterfinals
(Serbia) N Milojević	2	2
(India) S Myneni	6	6
(Bosnia and Herzegovina) M Bašić	5	7	3
2	(Israel) D Sela	7	5	6

Semifinals
(India) S Myneni	4	3
2	(Israel) D Sela	6	6
