= 2015 Batman Cup =

- Date: 6–12 April
- Edition: 1st
- Draw: 32S / 16D
- Prize money: €42,500
- Surface: Hard
- Location: Batman, Turkey

Champions

Singles
- (Israel) Dudi Sela

Doubles
- (Russia) Aslan Karatsev / (Belarus) Yaraslav Shyla
| Batman Cup | · 2016 → |

The 2015 Batman Cup was a professional tennis tournament played on hard courts. It was the first edition of the tournament, which was part of the 2015 ATP Challenger Tour. It took place in Batman, Turkey from April 6 to April 12, 2015.

== Singles main-draw entrants ==
=== Seeds ===
| Country | Player | Rank^{1} | Seed |
|---|---|---|---|
| SLO | Blaž Kavčič | 88 | 1 |
| ISR | Dudi Sela | 112 | 2 |
| KAZ | Aleksandr Nedovyesov | 118 | 3 |
| RUS | Alexander Kudryavtsev | 128 | 4 |
| MDA | Radu Albot | 145 | 5 |
| BEL | Niels Desein | 157 | 6 |
| JPN | Hiroki Moriya | 161 | 7 |
| RUS | Konstantin Kravchuk | 165 | 8 |

- Rankings are as of March 23, 2015.

=== Other entrants ===
The following players received wildcards into the singles main draw:

- (Turkey) Altuğ Çelikbilek
- (Turkey) Barış Ergüden
- (Turkey) Barkın Yalçınkale
- (Turkey) Anıl Yüksel

The following players received entry from the qualifying draw:

- (Italy) Riccardo Ghedin
- (Georgia (country)) Aleksandre Metreveli
- (Lithuania) Lukas Mugevičius
- (New Zealand) Michael Venus

== Champions ==
=== Singles ===
- (Israel) Dudi Sela def. (Slovenia) Blaž Kavčič, 6–7^{(5–7)}, 6–3, 6–3

=== Doubles ===
- (Russia) Aslan Karatsev / (Belarus) Yaraslav Shyla def. (Croatia) Mate Pavić / (New Zealand) Michael Venus, 7–6^{(7–4)}, 4–6, [10–5]
