= Batman Cup =

Defunct tennis tournament
- Abolished: 2015
- Location: Batman, Turkey
- Venue: TPAO Batman Bölge Müdürlüğü
- Category: ATP Challenger Tour
- Surface: Hard
- Draw: 32S/16Q/16D
- Prize money: €42,500

The Batman Cup was a professional tennis tournament played on hardcourts. It was part of the ATP Challenger Tour, held in Batman, Turkey, and its only edition was held in 2015.

== Past finals ==
=== Singles ===
Year	Champion	Runner-up	Score
2015	(Israel) Dudi Sela	(Slovenia) Blaž Kavčič	6–7^{(5–7)}, 6–3, 6–3

=== Doubles ===
Year	Champions	Runners-up	Score
2015	(Russia) Aslan Karatsev (Belarus) Yaraslav Shyla	(Croatia) Mate Pavić (New Zealand) Michael Venus	7–6^{(7–4)}, 4–6, [10–5]
