= Dudi Sela =

Israeli tennis player (born 1985)

Dudi Sela דודי סלע
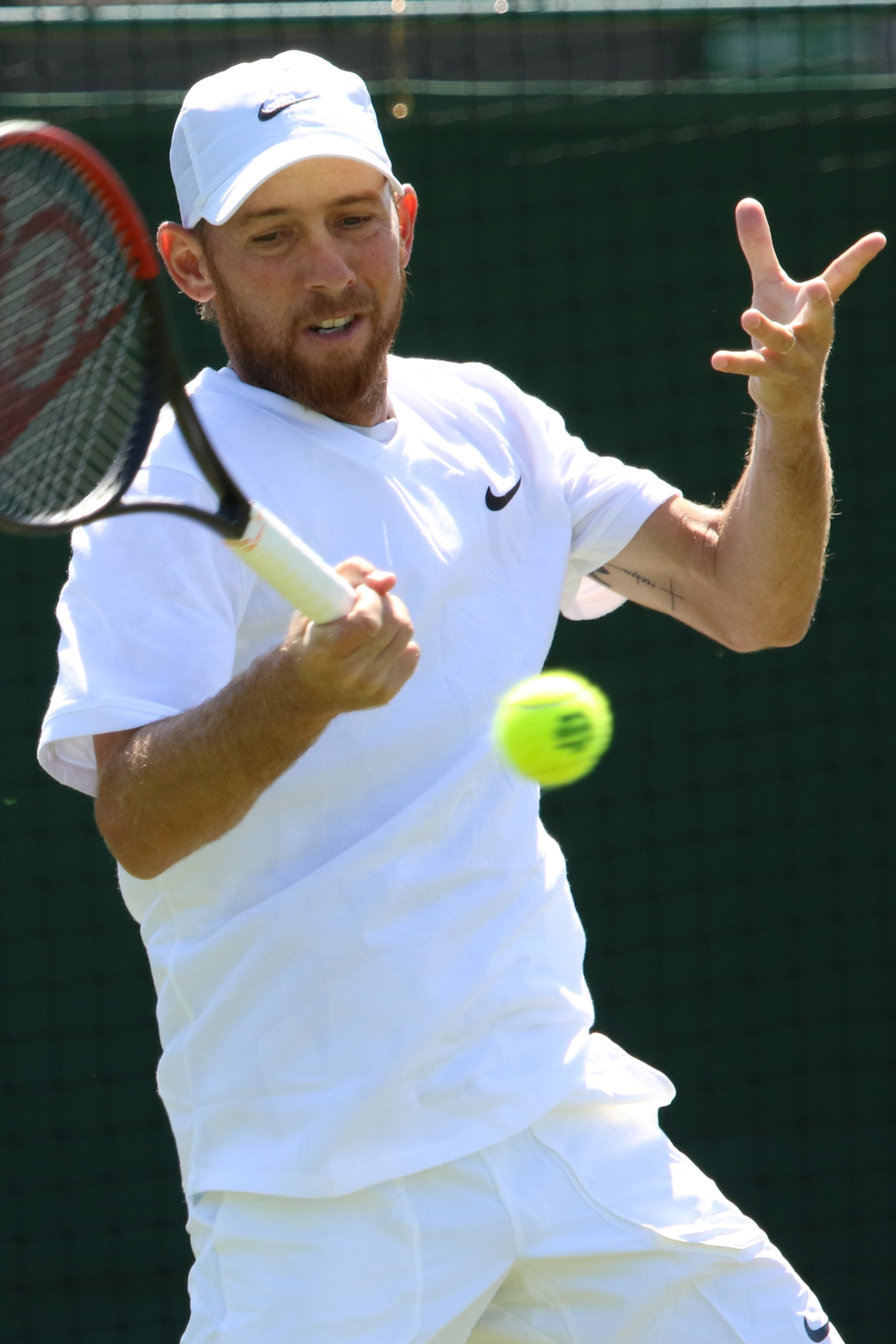
- Sela at the 2022 Wimbledon Championships
- Country (sports): Israel
- Residence: Tel Aviv, Israel
- Born: 4 April 1985 (age 41) Kiryat Shmona, Israel
- Height: 1.75 m (5 ft 9 in)
- Turned pro: 2002
- Retired: 2022
- Plays: Right-handed (one-handed backhand)
- Coach: Yoav Ben Zvi
- Prize money: US$4,003,831

Singles
- Career record: 143–195
- Career titles: 0
- Highest ranking: No. 29 (20 July 2009)

Grand Slam singles results
- Australian Open: 3R (2009, 2015, 2016)
- French Open: 2R (2009, 2015)
- Wimbledon: 4R (2009)
- US Open: 2R (2007, 2010, 2011, 2013, 2014, 2017)

Other tournaments
- Olympic Games: 2R (2016)

Doubles
- Career record: 26–48
- Career titles: 1
- Highest ranking: No. 122 (22 February 2010)

Grand Slam doubles results
- Australian Open: 2R (2010)
- French Open: 2R (2010, 2012)
- Wimbledon: 2R (2016)
- US Open: 3R (2009, 2017)

Team competitions
- Davis Cup: SF (2009)
- Last updated on: 25 September 2022.

David "Dudi" Sela (Hebrew: דודי סלע; born 4 April 1985) is an Israeli former professional tennis player. He reached a career-high singles ranking of World No. 29 in July 2009.

Sela won the French Open 2003 junior doubles title. Representing Israel in the Davis Cup, his highlights include a win in 2007 over then-world No. 7 Fernando González, and being a key player in Israel's semifinal run in 2009. In 2008 he beat world No. 5 David Ferrer in straight sets, and in 2010 he beat world No. 7 Andy Roddick in straight sets. Sela reached the fourth round of the 2009 Wimbledon Championships and has finished runner-up in two ATP tournaments in Beijing and Atlanta. In 2015, he won his 24th career ATP Challenger event of his career, moving him into second place on the all-time list of Challenger title wins (behind Lu Yen-hsun).

== Early life ==
Sela was born and raised in Kiryat Shmona, an Israeli city near the Israel-Lebanon border. His father Michael, a bus driver, and mother Anca, a nurse from a Jewish family, immigrated to Israel from Romania. His family name was originally Sălăjean, but his father changed it so that it would be more easily pronounced in Israel.

At the age of two, Dudi, diminutive of David, had his hands on his first racket, and at the age of seven he began to play tennis. His tennis idols were his brother Ofer, who was a top 200 player, and the Israeli Amos Mansdorf.

At age 18, Sela was exempted from conscription into the Israel Defense Forces.

== Juniors: 2000–03 ==
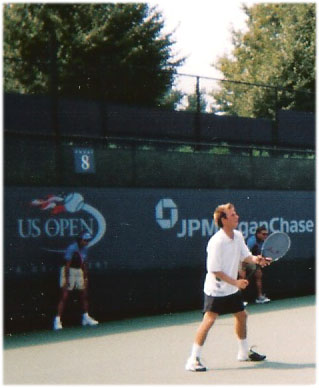
Dudi Sela at the 2003 U.S. Open

Sela played his first junior match in 1999 at the age of 14 at a grade 5 tournament in Greece. In 2000 Sela won in doubles play with Idan Ben-Harosh in the Haifa International and in Corfu, Greece. In 2001 he won in doubles with Maor Zirkin reached the finals in singles play at the Israel International. He won his first singles title in Van Keeken of the Netherlands. He won in both singles and doubles (with Michael Ryderstedt) at the Fischer Junior Open.

In 2002, Sela reached the quarterfinals in the Australian Open Junior Competition and was in the top eight at the French Open Juniors. He won at Beaulieu Sur Mer. In 2003, his final year as a junior, he reached the quarterfinals at the Roland Garros Junior singles competition and won the French Open 2003 doubles title with partner Győrgy Balázs of Hungary. He made it to the semifinals at the US Open Junior Championships and won the Australia F1 tournament in Tasmania. In July he triumphed at the Togliatti competition in Russia, resulting in a new ATP ranking of 256.

Sela's highest junior world rankings were No. 9 in the ITF singles rankings (in 2002) and No. 16 in doubles.

Junior Grand Slam results – Singles:

Australian Open: QF (2002)
French Open: QF (2002, 2003)
Wimbledon: 2R (2003)
US Open: SF (2003)

Junior Grand Slam results – Doubles:

Australian Open: 1R (2002)
French Open: W (2003)
Wimbledon: 1R (2003)
US Open: SF (2002)

== Pro career ==
=== 2004–06: Top 200 ===
His best results in 2004 were the semifinals at the Covington Challenger, and the quarterfinals in four other Challenger tournaments.

Sela had a successful year on the ATP Challenger circuit in 2005, winning tournaments in Vancouver, Canada, and Lexington, Kentucky, in consecutive weeks. He had a 21–11 record in Challengers.

In 2006 Sela five USTA Pro Circuit singles titles: at Claremont, California, Costa Mesa, California, Waikoloa, Hawaii, Honolulu, and at the Price LeBlanc Lexus Pro Tennis Classic in Baton Rouge, Louisiana.

=== 2007: Breaking top 100 ===
In January 2007, Sela qualified for the main draw of the 2007 Australian Open. In the first round he upset Paradorn Srichaphan of Thailand, who was ranked #56 in the world. In the second round, he lost to Marat Safin in five sets, despite starting by leading the Russian two sets to one. In April 2007, Sela lost in the semifinals in a Challenger tournament to Paul Baccanello in Lanzarote, Spain.

In July 2007 he lost in the finals of the Open Diputación in Córdoba, Spain. In the tournament he defeated #47 ranked Albert Montañés. Later in July, he won a challenger title in Togliatti, Russia, his fourth career title, beating Russia's Mikhail Ledovskikh in the final.

Sela then qualified for the US Open. In the first round of the main draw he defeated Nicolás Lapentti, his fourth upset of a top 100 player in the first 8 months of the year. Lapentti was once ranked as high as #6 in the world, but at the time of the match was ranked #80. Sela lost to world #23 Juan Mónaco in the second round.

In October he first defeated world #51 Juan Martín del Potro at the Japan Open in Tokyo, followed by #90 Boris Pašanski. Sela won the Seoul Challenger tournament later in October, winning all five of his matches in straight sets. The win lifted him to a career-high 73 in the world.

Sela had considered retiring before the start of 2008 if he did not make a breakthrough, but things came together. In October he said: "My target is to reach the top 70 within the next year."

He lost in the finals of the ATP Taiwan Challenge in Kaohsiung in November to Lu Yen-hsun, but won the doubles title together with Stephen Amritraj of India. He won the Keio Challenger in Yokohama the following week, losing only one set (in a tiebreaker). In December 2007, he had his revenge on Marat Safin in Saint Anton, with a straight-set win. It was his tenth win over a player in the top-100 in the year. For the year he compiled a 33–14 match record in Challenger play with two titles, went 10–5 (all on hard courts) in ATP level competition, and became the first Israeli man to finish in the top 100 since Harel Levy in 2001.

=== 2008: Breaking top 60 & first ATP final ===
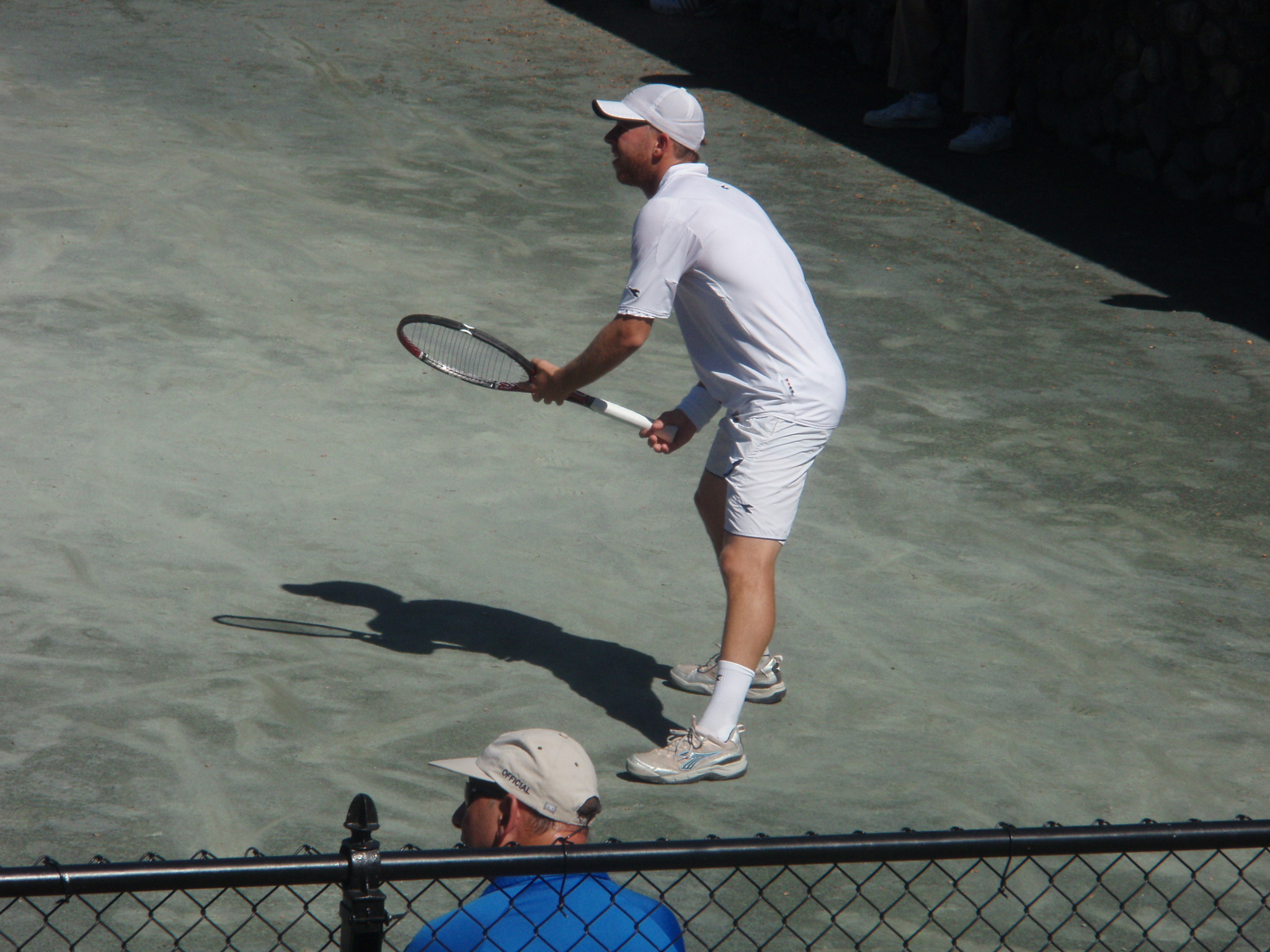
Sela In New York (2008)

In the Australian Open, Sela won his first round match over qualifier Martin Slanar but lost his second round to world #24 Ivo Karlović.

In March at the Pacific Life Open he defeated world #49 Nicolas Kiefer, then at the Sony Ericsson Open in Miami he defeated world #48 Hyung-Taik Lee of Korea, and #14 Tommy Robredo of Spain in the 2nd round. In May in Austria he defeated world #80 Mischa Zverev of Germany and in July he won the Vancouver challenger, beating Kevin Kim in the final.

Sela was gravely disappointed by the failure of the Israel Olympic Committee to allow him to represent Israel at the 2008 Olympics in Beijing. Despite the fact that Sela met the International Olympic Committee's criteria to play in the Olympics, and the Israel Tennis Association recommended that he deserved to go, the Israel Olympic Committee refused to accept the recommendation. Sela said he learned he wasn't going to be permitted to go to the Olympics because "I wasn't inside the top 50 ranked players.... I met the International Olympic Committee's criteria. But they don't want to send me, and I don't understand why. It's not like I'm 500th in the world, I'm 60th. When Nicolás Massú won the Olympics he was ranked 70th, so it shows anything can happen. I want to go and be the first Israeli to play in the men's singles for 20 years."

In August Sela defeated world #97 Vince Spadea of the United States at the Legg Mason Classic in Washington. Later in the month he beat world #99 Donald Young, in New Haven, Connecticut at the Pilot Pen tournament.

Sela reached his first ATP Tour final in September at the China Open, while ranked #92. Sela, unseeded, defeated the world #61 Frenchman Nicolas Devilder in the first round. In the second round, Sela upset the first seed and world #5, David Ferrer, in straight sets. Sela continued his run by defeating the sixth seed, world #16 Tommy Robredo, and the seventh seed, world #35 Rainer Schüttler. Sela was defeated by Andy Roddick in the final. Sela became the first Israeli since Harel Levy in 2001 to reach an ATP final. "Dudi reached the final and realized he had it", said his brother Ofer. "He beat top-30 players day after day.... It was the first time he proved he was no paper tiger, but one who can dish it out to everyone. He always knew he had the potential, but suddenly he understood how to fulfill it."

In October, he defeated the world #72 Victor Hănescu at the Kremlin Cup.

=== 2009: Breaking top 30 ===
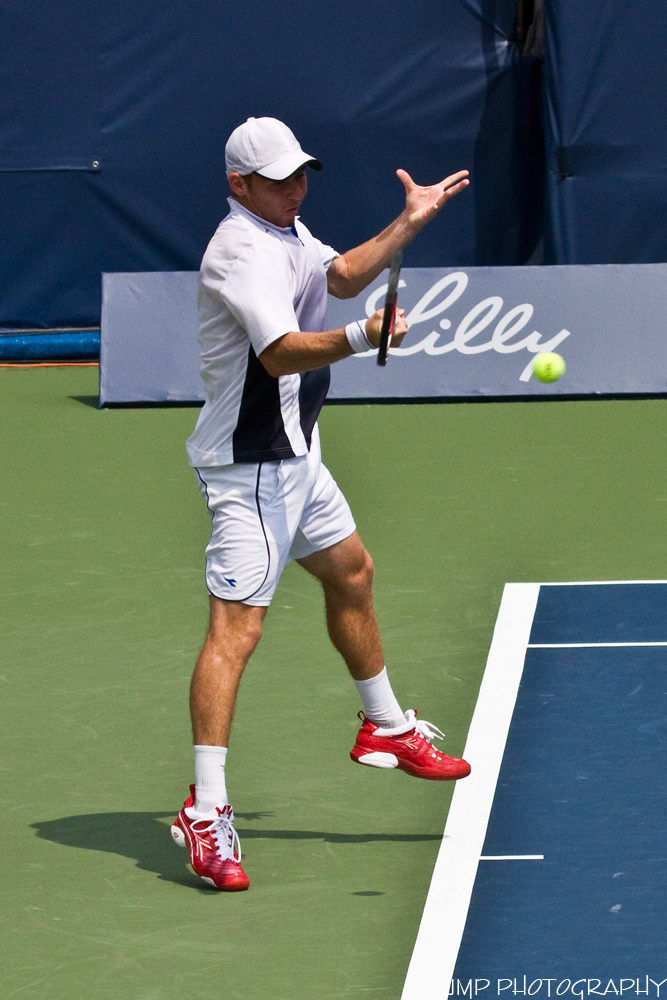
Sela at the 2009 Indianapolis Tennis Championships

In the Australian Open, Sela won three rounds of qualifiers in order to make the main draw. In the final round, Sela beat Grega Žemlja of Slovenia in dramatic fashion, surviving six match points.

In the main draw, Sela beat 30th-seeded German veteran Rainer Schüttler, who was ranked number 31 in the world. In the second round, he defeated world number 44 Victor Hănescu of Romania, saving all 12 of Hănescu's break points. He was the first Israeli man to reach the third round of a Grand Slam since Amos Mansdorf progressed to the round of 32 in Wimbledon in 1994. In the round of 32, however, Sela was defeated by fifth-seeded Jo-Wilfried Tsonga.

In February at the Regions Morgan Keegan Championships in Memphis, Sela made it through two rounds of qualifying matches, and then as far as the semifinals. Along the way he beat world number 92 Robert Kendrick, world number 73 Bobby Reynolds, world number 54 Florent Serra of France, and world number 43 Igor Kunitsyn of Russia. With that, he raised his world ranking to number 65. In late February at the Delray Beach International Tennis Championships, he beat world number 80 Philipp Petzschner of Germany. In March, he defeated world number 42 José Acasuso at the BMW Tennis Championship, but withdrew in his next match after suffering a leg injury.

In May, he reached a new career-high world ranking of number 55. That month, he won his first round match at the 2009 French Open, his first French Open victory ever, against Jean-René Lisnard of Monaco. In June at the Ordina Open, he defeated world number 59 Christophe Rochus, and at 's-Hertogenbosch in the Netherlands in a grass-court tuneup for Wimbledon, he beat world number 39 Igor Kunitsyn. He again reached a career-high singles ranking, this time number 46.

In the first round at Wimbledon, Sela defeated Mexican Santiago González and in the second round, he upset 2008 semifinalist, world number 29 German Rainer Schüttler, seeded eighteenth.

"I like it when there is a lot of chaos going on on the court. It reminds me of Israel. I play a lot better when it's like that."

— Sela, commenting on the chanting and flag-waving during his Wimbledon matches

In the third round, Sela was urged on by a contingent of supporters who for much of the first two sets chanted a Hebrew song, translated roughly as: "David, King of Israel is alive and lives on!" Sela defeated world number 15 Tommy Robredo of Spain, seeded fifteenth; he is now 3–0 lifetime against Robredo. Al Jazeera described the upset as a "shock result". That advanced Sela to the round of 16, his first Grand Slam 4th round, which The Independent described as the "surprise of the week". Sela became the first Israeli man in 20 years (since Amos Mansdorf in 1989) to reach the fourth round at Wimbledon, and the fourth Israeli man ever (and first since Mansdorf at the 1992 Australian Open) to reach the fourth round in a Grand Slam. The victory guaranteed him a payday of at least $80,000.

Sela next sought to join Shlomo Glickstein (1981 Australian Open), Mansdorf (1992 Australian Open), and Shahar Pe'er (2007 Australian Open and 2007 US Open) as the only Israelis to have made it to a Grand Slam quarterfinal. He was defeated in the fourth round, however, by the 2008 Australian Open champion, then-world number 4 Serbian Novak Djokovic.

On the strength of his Wimbledon performance, Sela rose to a career-high world number 33 in July 2009. Following his victory in the Davis Cup against Russia the next week, he rose again to a new career high, this time number 29, one better than the career-high of Davis Cup teammate Harel Levy.

In late July, Sela was seeded second for the 2009 Indianapolis Tennis Championships in singles. In doubles, Sela partnered American Jesse Levine and defeated Denis Istomin of Uzbekistan and Josselin Ouanna of France to make it to the quarterfinals.

=== 2010: Challenger tour success ===
On 10 June 2010, at the 2010 Aegon Championships, Sela upset number 4 seed, and world number 7, Andy Roddick in straight sets. He won the Rhodes Challenger in May, defeating former top ten player Rainer Schüttler. On 8 August 2010, he won the Odlum Brown Vancouver Open title, upsetting the first seed Taylor Dent in the semifinal and the fourth seed Ričardas Berankis in the final. He has a career 15–0 in this tournament (including winning 2005 and 2008 titles).

=== 2012–15: 100 wins & second ATP final ===
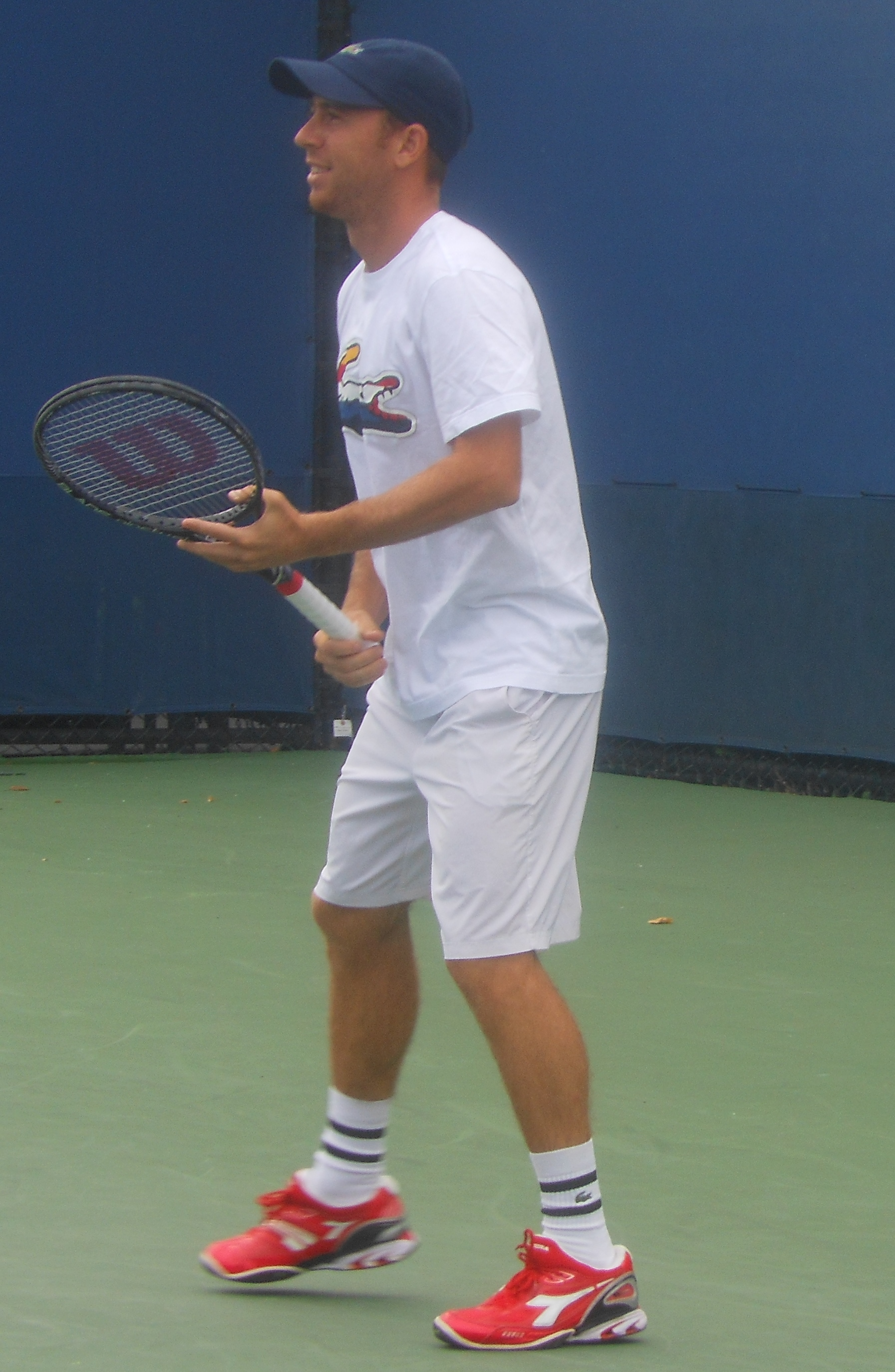
Dudi Sela at the 2013 US Open

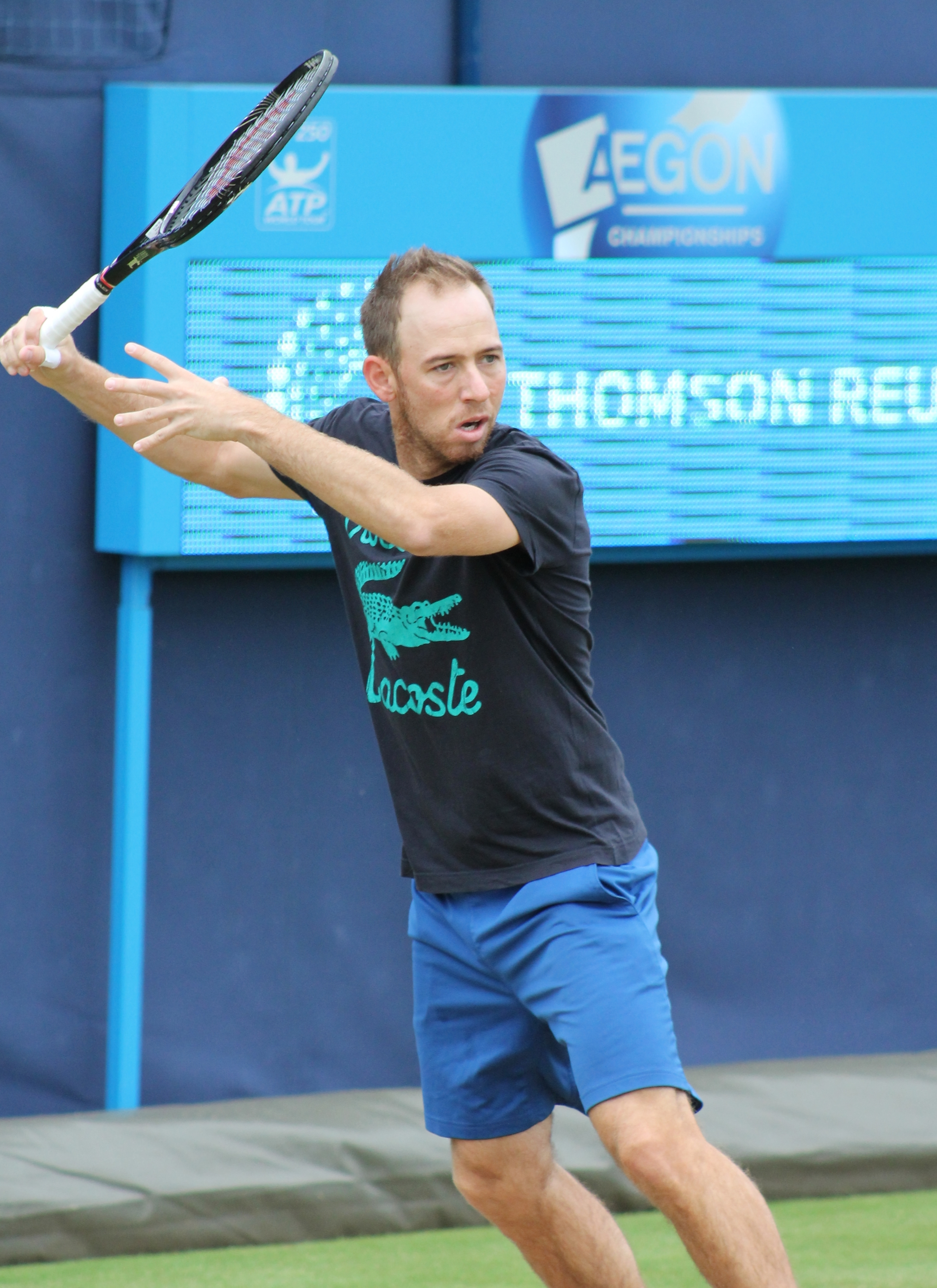
Sela at the 2013 Aegon Championships

Sela defeated American Sam Querrey in Hall of Fame Tennis championships.

In March 2013, Dudi Sela reached the Round of 64 at the Miami Masters, where he lost 2–6 4–6 to world number 9 ranked player Janko Tipsarević.

In September 2013, Dudi Sela defeated Andrey Kuznetsov of Russia W 7–6(2), 6–3, 6–7(2), 5–7, 6–4 in the first round of the 2013 US Open. Sela then lost 4–6 4–6 1–6 in the second round to Janko Tipsarević. In 2013, Dudi also won challenger events in Tashkent, Astana, and Busan. Additionally, he was also a finalist in a challenger event at Istanbul.

In January 2014, Sela reached the Quarterfinals of the Chennai Open in India beating Lukáš Lacko and Mikhail Youzhny before losing to Edouard Roger Vasselin. In the first round of the Australian Open, Dudi lost to Jarkko Nieminen 6–3, 6–7(3), 7–6(3), 3–6, 3–6.

In February, Sela reached the quarterfinals of the PBZ Zagreb Indoors where he beat Lukáš Rosol and Lukáš Lacko before losing to Björn Phau 4–6 3–6. At the Delray Beach Open in Florida, Dudi lost to John Isner 6–3, 1–6, 6–7(5) in a tight second round match.

Sela achieved a notable success in 2015 at Challenger level when he won the Odlum Brown Vancouver Open for the fourth time. Sela's victory made him just the fifth man in history to win a particular ATP Challenger tournament four or more times, and also moved him into sole possession of second place on the all-time list of Challenger title wins, with 24. In May 2015 he won in Batman, Turkey, defeating Blaž Kavčič in the final, in August 2015 he won in Vancouver, Canada, defeating John-Patrick Smith in the final, and in November 2015 he won in Suzhou, China.

=== 2016: Return to top 60 & first doubles title ===
At the 2016 Australian Open, he defeated Benjamin Becker in the first round, then defeated Fernando Verdasco (who had defeated Rafael Nadal in the first round in five sets) in four before losing to Andrey Kuznetsov in the third. After the Australian Open Sela was in bad shape and lost 4 consecutive matches, including a match against Péter Nagy who was ranked 612. However, in March he had three successful Challengers, including two semi-finals (Guangzhou, Ra'anana) and one title (Shenzhen).

He represented Israel in men's singles at the 2016 Summer Olympics where he defeated Damir Džumhur in the first round but lost to 8th seed David Goffin in the second round.

=== 2017: Wimbledon run, Yom Kippur retirement ===
In 2017, Sela reached one semifinal and two quarterfinals on the ATP Tour, and won two more Challenger Tour titles. In January he won in Canberra, Australia, defeating Jan-Lennard Struff in the final, and in June he won in Nottingham, Great Britain, defeating Thomas Fabbiano in the final. He also won at least one match in the three Grand Slam tournaments in which he played.

At the 2017 Wimbledon Championships, Sela went on a runt to the third round defeating Marcel Granollers and 23rd seed John Isner along the way. His run was end by 13th seed Grigor Dimitrov after he was forced to retire in the third set due to injury.

Sela quit his quarterfinal match in the third set of the 2017 ATP Shenzhen Open against Alexandr Dolgopolov so he could begin observing Yom Kippur by the time the sun set, forfeiting a possible $34,000 in prize money and 90 rankings points.

Sela concluded the year with his highest year-end ranking in eight years, at No. 67 in the world.

=== 2018: Indian Wells run, early end to season ===
In 2018, Sela went on a run to the third round of the 2018 Indian Wells Masters as a lucky loser defeating Peter Gojowczyk and 21st seed Kyle Edmund along the way. His run was ended by qualifier Marcos Baghdatis in straight sets. It would be his last Masters 1000 tournament to date.

At the 2018 Wimbledon Championships, Sela played world number 1 Rafael Nadal in the first round and lost in straight sets. It would be his last grand slam to date.

Sela ended his 2018 season after his quarterfinal loss at the 2018 Hall of Fame Open to recover from wrist and back injuries. His year-end ranking was 236 which was the first time in five years and the second time in eleven years that he finished the year outside the top 100.

=== 2019: Challenger title and finals ===
In 2019, after losing the final of two more challenger events, Sela won the 2019 Little Rock Challenger. As a result of this, Sela's ranking increased from 208 to 164 in the world. He also made the final of the 2019 Cassis Challenger in September but lost to top seed Jo-Wilfried Tsonga in just 43 minutes winning only one game in the process which set a record for the shortest challenger match.

Sela received a wildcard into the main draw of the 2019 St. Petersburg Open but lost in the first round to Ričardas Berankis in straight sets. It would be his last ATP match to date.

For the first time since 2006, Sela failed to record an ATP win during the entire year marking a severe dip in form.

=== 2020: Inactivity due to COVID-19 ===
Sela failed to record a win at any level during the year. After the COVID-19 pandemic suspended tennis in March, he decided to remain inactive for the rest of 2020 even when tennis returned in August.

=== 2021: Wimbledon qualifying draw and positive COVID-19 test ===
In 2021, Sela played his first match in over a year when he entered the qualifying draw of the 2021 Wimbledon Championships as a protected ranking. He defeated British wildcard Stuart Parker in the first round before losing in the second round to 5th seed Yasutaka Uchiyama in three sets. He also entered the qualifying draw of the 2021 US Open but later withdrew due to testing positive for COVID-19 and was replaced by Jesper de Jong.

=== 2022: All Majors qualifying draws participation, Retirement ===
In January, he announced his plans to retire after the 2022 season.

Sela began his 2022 season with a protected ranking entry into the qualifying draw of the 2022 Australian Open where he lost in the first round to Mario Vilella Martínez in straight sets.

He played his last US Open as a qualifier where he lost in the first round of qualifying to Kaichi Uchida.

== Davis Cup ==
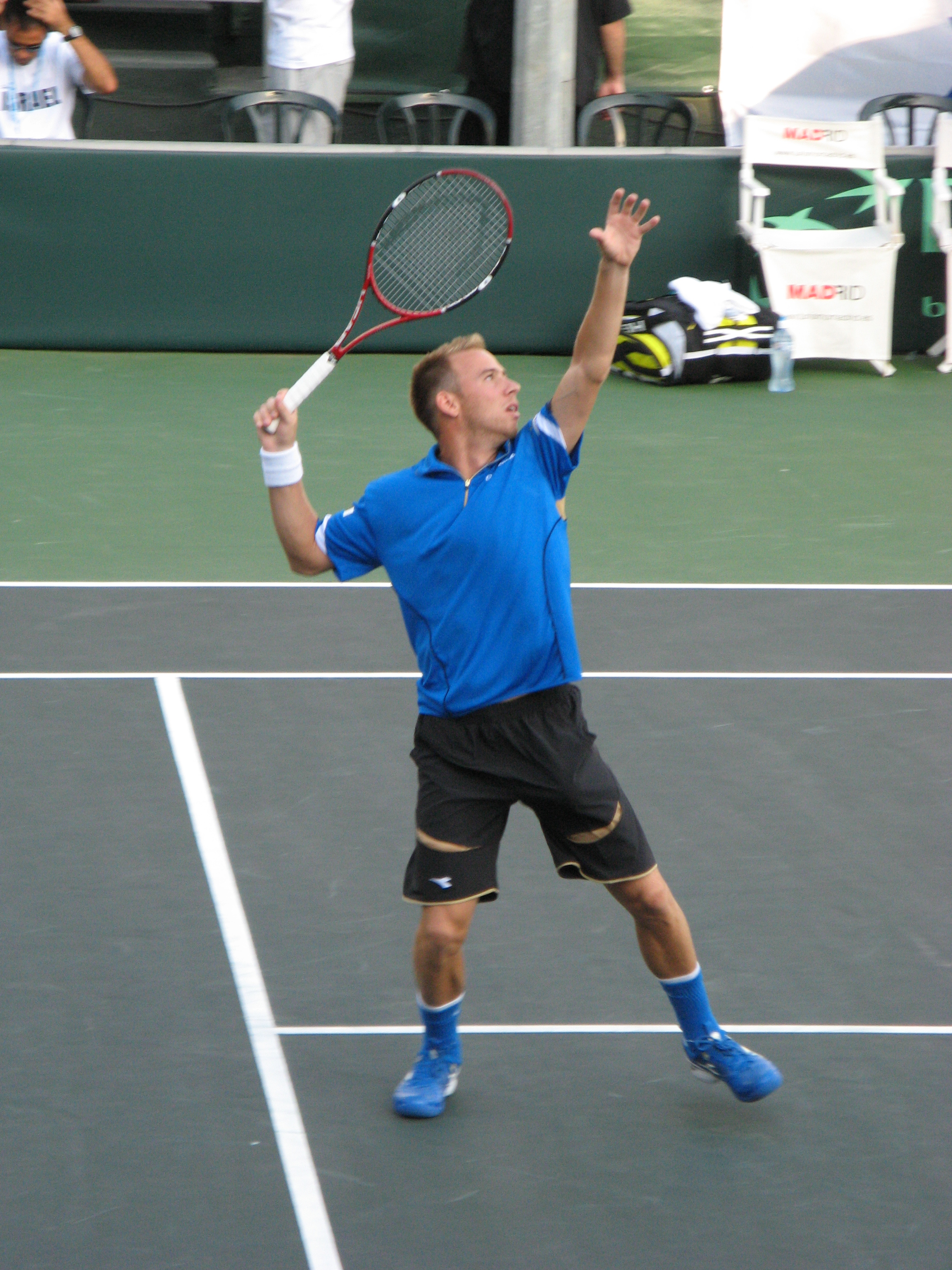
Sela playing Davis Cup

In late 2005, he joined the Israeli Davis Cup team. He is 12–6 through July 2009.

In April 2007 he upset Andreas Seppi, ranked #91 in the world, as Israel defeated Italy.

Before the Chile-Israel Davis Cup match began in September 2007, even The Jewish Chronicle wrote: "Led by Fernando González (6) and Nicolás Massú (72), it is hard to see Israel's Dudi Sela (105) and Noam Okun (186), backed up by doubles specialists Andy Ram and Jonathan Erlich, winning the contest. González and Massú are also a formidable doubles partnership, having won the Olympic gold medal in Athens in 2004."

That same month, before playing Nicolás Massú of Chile in the first match of the tie, Sela said: "We like being the underdog. I'm very pleased with the fact that I'm playing first and I'm very confident of claiming the win." He then proceeded to upset Massu, ranked #72 in the world, and formerly ranked #9 in the world, in a 5-hour 7-minute match. "This is definitely the biggest win in my career", Sela said afterwards. Later in that Davis Cup tie, Dudi Sela defeated #7 in the world Fernando González in a 5-hour 1-minute match. It is arguably the greatest tennis match ever played in Israel. The victory lifted Israel over Chile and into 2008's World Group. Gonzalez was at the time the highest-ranked player Sela had ever beaten in his career (he later beat world #5 David Ferrer in Beijing in September 2008), and his 6th upset of a top-100 player in the first 9 months of the year. Elated, Sela said "This is definitely the happiest day of my life." Sela was congratulated over the phone by Prime Minister Ehud Olmert and President Shimon Peres after the match.

In the 2008 World Group, Israel hosted Sweden in Ramat HaSharon. Sela started with a win against world #71 Jonas Björkman and gave Israel an advantage of 1–0. He then lost to world #60 Thomas Johansson as Israel lost the tie 3–2. In the 2008 World Group Playoffs, Sela led the Israeli team to a 4–1 victory over Peru at Ramat HaSharon. Sela won both his singles contests, defeating Iván Miranda and Luis Horna.

In the 2009 World Group Playoffs in March 2009, Israel again faced seven-time Davis Cup champion Sweden. Sela led the Israeli team to a come-from-behind 3–2 victory over the Swedes at Baltic Hall in Malmö, Sweden, to advance in the 2009 Davis Cup. Sela won each of his singles matches in 5 sets, coming from behind to defeat Andreas Vinciguerra in his hometown and came from behind to stun 2002 Australian Open champion Thomas Johansson. Sela views it as the biggest win of his career to that point. In their 84-year Davis Cup history, the Swedes had never before lost a tie after holding a 2–1 lead. The last time Israel's Davis Cup team reached the level of being one of the top eight tennis nations in the world was in 1987, against India.

Israel (ranked 8th in the Davis Cup standings, with 5,394 points) hosted heavily favored Russia (which won in both 2002 and 2006, and was the top-ranked country in Davis Cup standings, with 27,897 points) in a Davis Cup quarterfinal tie in July 2009, on indoor hard courts at the Nokia Arena in Tel Aviv. Israel was represented by Sela, Harel Levy, Jonathan Erlich, and Andy Ram. Russia's lineup consisted of Marat Safin (#60 in the world; former world #1), Igor Andreev (24), Igor Kunitsyn (35), and Mikhail Youzhny (69; former world #8). Sela said before the tie: "We feel we can beat the Russians." The stage was then set by Safin, who prior to the tie told the press: "With all due respect, Israel was lucky to get to the quarterfinals." The Israeli team's response was to beat the Russian team in each of their first three matches, thereby winning the tie. Levy, world #210, beat Russia's top player, Andreev, world #24 in the opening match. Sela (#33) followed by beating Russian Youzhny. Israeli captain Eyal Ran likened his players to two fighter jets on court, saying: "I felt as if I had two F-16s out there today, they played amazingly well." The 10,500 spectators were the largest crowd ever for a tennis match in Israel. The next day Israelis Ram and Erlich beat Safin and Kunitsyn in front of a boisterous crowd of over 10,000. Even the Saudi Gazette described the doubles match as a "thrilling" win. Ran was carried shoulder-high around the Tel Aviv stadium, as the 10,000-strong crowd applauded. With the tie clinched for Israel, the reverse singles rubbers were "dead", and instead of best-of-five matches, best-of-three sets were played, with the outcomes of little to no importance. Israel wrapped up a 4–1 victory over Russia, as Levy defeated Kunitsyn, while Sela retired with a wrist injury while down 3–4 in the first set against Andreev. Israel, however, lost to Spain in the semi-finals, 4–1.

== Playing style ==
Sela's playing style is very fast, aggressive and viewed as a serve and volleyer by some.

== Coaching ==
During his career he has also been coached by his brother Ofer Sela, Tomi Schnitzer, Australian-born former Israeli Davis Cup coach Ron Steele, and Israelis Noam Behr, Yoav Shab, Yoram Menahem, and Amos Mansdorf.

== Jewish heritage ==
Sela, along with Diego Schwartzman, Camila Giorgi, Julia Glushko, Noah Rubin and Aslan Karatsev, is one of a number of Jewish tennis players who are highly ranked. "It's very special being able to play around the world", Sela said. "It is fun playing in different places because Jewish people will come out to watch me."

Sela enjoys support outside of Israel from his fan brigade, known as the "Hebrew Hammer", whose chanting in both English and Hebrew aims to replicate the raucous atmosphere of tennis matches in Tel Aviv that helped him defeat the likes of González in arguably his most historic victory. Originating at the LA Tennis Open in 2008, the Hebrew Hammer has been spotlit on telecasts by the Tennis Channel.

== Personal life ==
Sela has three children with his wife Marina, son Elai, daughter Talia and son Roy. He has a brother, Ofer Sela (b. 1972).

== ATP career finals ==
=== Singles: 2 (2 runner-ups) ===
Legend Grand Slam tournaments (0–0) ATP World Tour Finals (0–0) ATP World Tour Masters 1000 (0–0) ATP World Tour 500 Series (0–0) ATP World Tour 250 Series (0–2)	Titles by surface Hard (0–2) Clay (0–0) Grass (0–0)	Titles by setting Outdoor (0–2) Indoor (0–0)

Result	W–L	Date	Tournament	Tier	Surface	Opponent	Score
Loss	0–1	Sep 2008	China Open, China	International	Hard	(United States) Andy Roddick	4–6, 7–6^{(8–6)}, 3–6
Loss	0–2	Jul 2014	Atlanta Open, United States	250 Series	Hard	(United States) John Isner	3–6, 4–6

=== Doubles: 1 (1 title) ===
Legend Grand Slam tournaments (0–0) ATP World Tour Finals (0–0) ATP World Tour Masters 1000 (0–0) ATP World Tour 500 Series (0–0) ATP World Tour 250 Series (1–0)	Titles by surface Hard (0–0) Clay (1–0) Grass (0–0)	Titles by setting Outdoor (1–0) Indoor (0–0)

Result	W–L	Date	Tournament	Tier	Surface	Partner	Opponents	Score
Win	1–0	May 2016	Istanbul Open, Turkey	250 Series	Clay	(Italy) Flavio Cipolla	(Argentina) Andrés Molteni (Argentina) Diego Schwartzman	6–3, 5–7, [10–7]

== Challenger and Futures finals ==
=== Singles: 42 (30–12) ===
Legend (singles) ATP Challenger Tour Finals (0–1) ATP Challenger Tour (23–10) ITF Futures Tour (7–1)	Titles by surface Hard (28–11) Clay (0–1) Grass (2–0) Carpet (0–0)

Result	W–L	Date	Tournament	Tier	Surface	Opponent	Score
Win	1–0	Mar 2003	Australia F1, Burnie	Futures	Hard	(Australia) Paul Baccanello	4–3 ret.
Loss	1–1	May 2003	Italy F8, Verona	Futures	Clay	(Italy) Tomas Tenconi	6–4, 0–6, 2–6
Win	2–1	Jul 2003	Togliatti, Russia	Challenger	Hard	(Argentina) Juan Pablo Brzezicki	6–2, 6–4
Win	3–1	Feb 2005	Australia F2, Gosford	Futures	Hard	(Australia) Sadik Kadir	6–1, 6–1
Win	4–1	Jul 2005	Lexington, United States	Challenger	Hard	(United States) Bobby Reynolds	6–3, 3–6, 6–4
Win	5–1	Aug 2005	Vancouver, Canada	Challenger	Hard	(Australia) Paul Baccanello	6–2, 6–3
Win	6–1	Sep 2006	USA F22, Claremont	Futures	Hard	(Germany) Sascha Klör	5–1 ret.
Win	7–1	Sep 2006	USA F23, Costa Mesa	Futures	Hard	(United States) Robert Yim	7–5, 6–4
Win	8–1	Oct 2006	USA F27, Baton Rouge	Futures	Hard	(South Africa) Izak Van der Merwe	5–7, 6–4, 6–3
Win	9–1	Nov 2006	USA F28, Waikoloa	Futures	Hard	(United States) Lesley Joseph	6–1, 6–4
Win	10–1	Nov 2006	USA F29, Honolulu	Futures	Hard	(South Africa) Fritz Wolmarans	6–3, 6–3
Loss	10–2	Jul 2007	Córdoba, Spain	Challenger	Hard	(Spain) Adrián Menéndez Maceiras	4–6, 6–0, 5–7
Win	11–2	Jul 2007	Togliatti, Russia	Challenger	Hard	(Russia) Mikhail Ledovskikh	7–6^{(7–4)}, 6–3
Win	12–2	Oct 2007	Seoul, Korea, Rep.	Challenger	Hard	(Greece) Konstantinos Economidis	6–4, 6–4
Loss	12–3	Nov 2007	Kaohsiung, Chinese Taipei	Challenger	Hard	(Chinese Taipei) Lu Yen-hsun	3–6, 3–6
Win	13–3	Nov 2007	Yokohama, Japan	Challenger	Hard	(Japan) Takao Suzuki	6–7^{(5–7)}, 6–4, 6–2
Win	14–3	Aug 2008	Vancouver, Canada	Challenger	Hard	(United States) Kevin Kim	6–3, 6–0
Win	15–3	May 2010	Rhodes, Greece	Challenger	Hard	(Germany) Rainer Schüttler	7–6^{(7–3)}, 6–3
Win	16–3	Aug 2010	Vancouver, Canada	Challenger	Hard	(Lithuania) Ričardas Berankis	7–5, 6–2
Win	17–3	May 2011	Busan, Korea, Rep.	Challenger	Hard	(Japan) Tatsuma Ito	6–2, 6–7^{(5–7)}, 6–3
Win	18–3	May 2011	Fergana, Uzbekistan	Challenger	Hard	(Australia) Greg Jones	6–2, 6–1
Win	19–3	Jun 2011	Nottingham, Great Britain	Challenger	Grass	(France) Jérémy Chardy	6–4, 3–6, 7–5
Loss	19–4	Nov 2011	São Paulo, Brazil	Challenger Tour Finals	Hard (i)	(Germany) Cedrik-Marcel Stebe	2–6, 4–6
Win	20–4	Sep 2012	Bangkok, Thailand	Challenger	Hard	(Japan) Yūichi Sugita	6–1, 7–5
Win	21–4	May 2013	Busan, Korea, Rep.	Challenger	Hard	(Russia) Alex Bogomolov Jr.	6–1, 6–4
Loss	21–5	Jul 2013	Istanbul, Turkey	Challenger	Hard	(Germany) Benjamin Becker	1–6, 6–2, 2–3 ret.
Win	22–5	Jul 2013	Astana, Kazakhstan	Challenger	Hard	(Kazakhstan) Mikhail Kukushkin	5–7, 6–2, 7–6^{(8–6)}
Win	23–5	Oct 2013	Taskhent, Uzbekistan	Challenger	Hard	(Russia) Teymuraz Gabashvili	6–1, 6–2
Loss	23–6	Nov 2014	Helsinki, Finland	Challenger	Hard (i)	(Estonia) Jürgen Zopp	4–6, 7–5, 6–7^{(6–8)}
Win	24–6	Apr 2015	Batman, Turkey	Challenger	Hard	(Slovenia) Blaž Kavčič	6–7^{(5–7)}, 6–3, 6–3
Win	25–6	Aug 2015	Vancouver, Canada	Challenger	Hard	(Australia) John-Patrick Smith	6–4, 7–5
Win	26–6	Nov 2015	Suzhou, China, P.R.	Challenger	Hard	(Croatia) Matija Pecotić	6–1, 1–0 ret.
Loss	26–7	Jan 2016	Happy Valley, Australia	Challenger	Hard	(United States) Taylor Fritz	6–7^{(7–9)}, 2–6
Win	27–7	Mar 2016	Shenzhen, China, P.R.	Challenger	Hard	(China) Wu Di	6–4, 6–3
Loss	27–8	May 2016	Karshi, Uzbekistan	Challenger	Hard	(Serbia) Marko Tepavac	6–2, 3–6, 6–7^{(4–7)}
Loss	27–9	Sep 2016	Istanbul, Turkey	Challenger	Hard	(Tunisia) Malek Jaziri	6–1, 1–6, 0–6
Win	28–9	Jan 2017	Canberra, Australia	Challenger	Hard	(Germany) Jan-Lennard Struff	3–6, 6–4, 6–3
Win	29–9	Jun 2017	Nottingham, Great Britain	Challenger	Grass	(Italy) Thomas Fabbiano	4–6, 6–4, 6–3
Loss	29–10	Feb 2019	Bangkok, Thailand	Challenger	Hard	(Switzerland) Henri Laaksonen	2–6, 4–6
Loss	29–11	May 2019	Gwangju, Korea, Rep.	Challenger	Hard	(Chinese Taipei) Jason Jung	4–6, 2–6
Win	30–11	Jun 2019	Little Rock, United States	Challenger	Hard	(South Korea) Lee Duck-hee	6–1, 4–3 ret.
Loss	30–12	Sep 2019	Cassis, France	Challenger	Hard	(France) Jo-Wilfried Tsonga	1–6, 0–6

=== Doubles: 12 (6–6) ===
Legend (doubles) ATP Challenger Tour (5–5) ITF Futures Tour (1–1)	Titles by surface Hard (6–5) Clay (0–1) Grass (0–0) Carpet (0–0)

Result	W–L	Date	Tournament	Tier	Surface	Partner	Opponents	Score
Loss	0–1	Jul 2003	Recanati, Italy	Challenger	Hard	(France) Rodolphe Cadart	(Italy) Manuel Jorquera (Germany) Frank Moser	4–6, 5–7
Loss	0–2	Oct 2004	USA F28, Lubbock	Futures	Hard	(North Macedonia) Lazar Magdinčev	(France) Julien Cassaigne (Canada) Philip Gubenco	6–2, 6–7^{(5–7)}, 4–6
Win	1–2	Dec 2005	Israel F2, Ramat HaSharon	Futures	Hard	(Israel) Victor Kolik	(Ukraine) Oleksandr Nedovyesov (Latvia) Deniss Pavlovs	6–3, 6–3
Loss	1–3	Mar 2006	Ho Chi Minh City, Vietnam	Challenger	Hard	(Sweden) Jacob Adaktusson	(South Korea) Lee Hyung-taik (United States) Cecil Mamiit	4–6, 2–6
Loss	1–4	May 2006	Atlanta, USA	Challenger	Clay	(Israel) Harel Levy	(United States) Hugo Armando (Brazil) André Sá	4–6, 4–6
Loss	1–5	May 2007	Lanzarote, Spain	Challenger	Hard	(Israel) Noam Okun	(Australia) Luke Bourgeois (South Africa) Rik de Voest	3–6, 1–6
Win	2–5	Nov 2007	Kaohsiung, Chinese Taipei	Challenger	Hard	(India) Stephen Amritraj	(South Africa) Rik de Voest (Canada) Pierre-Ludovic Duclos	6–4, 7–6^{(7–4)}
Win	3–5	Jul 2012	Binghamton, USA	Challenger	Hard	(Israel) Harel Srugo	(Switzerland) Adrien Bossel (United States) Michael McClune	6–2, 3–6, [10–8]
Win	4–5	Mar 2013	Le Gosier, Gouadeloupe	Challenger	Hard	(Chinese Taipei) Jimmy Wang	(Germany) Philipp Marx (Romania) Florin Mergea	6–1, 6–2
Win	5–5	Oct 2015	Ningbo, China, P.R.	Challenger	Hard	(Israel) Amir Weintraub	(Croatia) Nikola Mektić (Croatia) Franko Škugor	6–3, 3–6, [10–6]
Loss	5–6	May 2017	Seoul, Korea, Rep.	Challenger	Hard	(Italy) Thomas Fabbiano	(Chinese Taipei) Hsieh Cheng-peng (Chinese Taipei) Peng Hsien-yin	1–5 ret.
Win	6–6	Jan 2019	Burnie, Australia	Challenger	Hard	(South Africa) Lloyd Harris	(Bosnia and Herzegovina) Mirza Bašić (Bosnia and Herzegovina) Tomislav Brkić	6–3, 6–7^{(3–7)}, [10–8]

== Junior Grand Slam finals ==
=== Doubles: 1 (1 title) ===
Result	Year	Tournament	Surface	Partner	Opponents	Score
Win	2003	French Open	Clay	(Hungary) György Balázs	(Georgia (country)) Lado Chikhladze (Slovakia) Kamil Čapkovič	5–7, 6–1, 6–2

== Performance timelines ==
=== Singles ===
Tournament	2003	2004	2005	2006	2007	2008	2009	2010	2011	2012	2013	2014	2015	2016	2017	2018	2019	2020	2021	2022	SR	W–L
Grand Slam tournaments
Australian Open	A	A	A	Q2	2R	2R	3R	1R	1R	1R	1R	1R	3R	3R	2R	1R	A	Q1	A	Q1	0 / 12	9–12
French Open	A	A	1R	Q2	Q1	1R	2R	1R	A	1R	A	1R	2R	1R	A	1R	A	A	A	Q1	0 / 9	2–9
Wimbledon	A	A	Q1	Q1	Q2	1R	4R	1R	2R	1R	Q1	1R	1R	1R	3R	1R	Q1	NH	Q2	Q1	0 / 10	6–10
US Open	Q3	A	Q1	Q1	2R	1R	1R	2R	2R	A	2R	2R	1R	1R	2R	A	Q1	A	A	Q1	0 / 10	6–10
Win–loss	0–0	0–0	0–1	0–0	2–2	1–4	6–4	1–4	2–3	0–3	1–2	1–4	3–4	2–4	4–3	0–3	0–0	0–0	0–0	0–0	0 / 41	23–41
ATP World Tour Masters 1000
Indian Wells Masters	A	A	A	A	Q1	2R	A	3R	A	2R	A	1R	Q1	A	1R	3R	A	NH	A	A	0 / 6	6–6
Miami Open	A	A	A	A	Q2	3R	1R	2R	Q1	1R	2R	A	A	A	2R	A	A	NH	A	A	0 / 6	5–6
Monte-Carlo Masters	A	A	A	A	A	A	Q1	A	A	A	A	A	A	A	A	A	A	NH	A	A	0 / 0	0–0
Madrid Open^{1}	A	A	A	A	A	A	A	A	A	A	A	A	A	A	A	A	A	NH	A	A	0 / 0	0–0
Italian Open	A	A	A	A	A	A	A	A	A	A	A	A	A	A	A	A	A	A	A	A	0 / 0	0–0
Canadian Open	A	A	A	A	A	A	1R	A	A	A	A	A	Q1	1R	1R	A	A	NH	A	A	0 / 3	0–3
Cincinnati Masters	A	A	A	A	A	A	1R	A	A	A	A	A	A	A	A	A	A	A	A	A	0 / 1	0–1
Shanghai Masters^{2}	A	A	A	A	A	A	1R	A	A	A	A	A	A	A	A	A	A	NH			0 / 1	0–1
Paris Masters	A	A	A	A	A	A	A	A	A	A	A	A	A	A	A	A	A	A	A	A	0 / 0	0–0
Win–loss	0–0	0–0	0–0	0–0	0–0	3–2	0–4	3–2	0–0	1–2	1–1	0–1	0–0	0–1	1–3	2–1	0–0	0–0	0–0	0–0	0 / 17	11–17
National representation
Davis Cup	A	A	Z1	Z1	PO	1R	SF	1R	PO	PO	1R	PO	Z1	Z1	Z1	Z1	Z1	A	A	A	0 / 4	23–25
Summer Olympics	NH	A	Not Held			A	Not Held			A	Not Held			2R	Not Held				A	NH	0 / 1	1–1
Career statistics
	2003	2004	2005	2006	2007	2008	2009	2010	2011	2012	2013	2014	2015	2016	2017	2018	2019	2020	2021	2022	Career	
Tournaments	0	0	1	0	4	22	20	17	13	17	7	19	9	17	15	8	1	0	0	0	170	
Titles / Finals	0 / 0	0 / 0	0 / 0	0 / 0	0 / 0	0 / 1	0 / 0	0 / 0	0 / 0	0 / 0	0 / 0	0 / 1	0 / 0	0 / 0	0 / 0	0 / 0	0 / 0	0 / 0	0 / 0	0 / 0	0 / 2	
Overall win–loss	0–0	0–0	1–2	0–2	10–5	17–23	18–22	16–20	18–15	12–19	4–10	18–21	8–10	11–18	13–17	7–9	0–2	0–0	0–0	0–0	143-195	
Win %	N/A	N/A	33%	0%	67%	43%	45%	44%	55%	39%	29%	46%	44%	38%	43%	44%	0%	N/A	N/A		42.31%	
Year-end ranking	259	308	170	202	64	112	43	75	83	109	73	99	100	96	67	236	142	233	381		42.31%	

^{1} Held as Hamburg Masters (clay) until 2008, Madrid Masters (clay) 2009–present.

^{2} Held as Madrid Masters (indoor hardcourt) from 2002 to 2008, Shanghai Masters (outdoor hardcourt) 2009–present.

=== Doubles ===
Current as far as the 2018 Australian Open.

Tournament	2007	2008	2009	2010	2011	2012	2013	2014	2015	2016	2017	2018	2019	2020	2021	2022	S/R	W–L
Grand Slam tournaments
Australian Open	A	1R	A	2R	1R	A	A	A	A	A	A	1R	A	A	A		0 / 4	1–4
French Open	A	1R	A	2R	A	2R	A	A	A	1R	A	A	A	A	A		0 / 4	2–4
Wimbledon	A	A	1R	A	Q1	1R	A	A	A	2R	1R	A	A	NH	A		0 / 4	1–4
US Open	A	A	3R	A	A	A	A	A	A	2R	3R	A	A	A	A		0 / 3	4–3
Win–loss	0–0	0–2	1–2	2–2	0–1	1–2	0–0	0–0	0–0	2–3	2–2	0–1	0–0	0–0	0–0	0–0	0 / 15	8–15
National representation
Davis Cup	A	A	A	A	A	A	1R	A	Z1	Z1	Z1	Z1	Z1	A	A		0 / 4	3–5
Career statistics
	2007	2008	2009	2010	2011	2012	2013	2014	2015	2016	2017	2018	2019	2020	2021	2022	Career	
Tournaments	1	7	6	6	4	4	2	3	1	6	7	2	0	0	0	0	49	
Titles / Finals	0 / 0	0 / 0	0 / 0	0 / 0	0 / 0	0 / 0	0 / 0	0 / 0	0 / 0	1 / 1	0 / 0	0 / 0	0 / 0	0 / 0	0 / 0	0 / 0	1 / 1	
Overall win–loss	1–1	2–7	3–6	4–6	2–4	1–4	1–2	1–3	1–0	6–5	4–8	0–2	0–0	0–0	0–0	0–0	26-48	
Year-end ranking	289	487	209	174	382	257	258	808	394	155	176	571	419	1189	1501		35.14%	

== Wins over top 10 players ==
#	Player	Rank	Event	Surface	Rd	Score	DS Rank
2007
1.	(Chile) Fernando González	6	Davis Cup, Israel	Hard	RR	4–6, 7–6^{(7–5)}, 5–7, 7–6^{(9–7)}, 6–3	105
2008
2.	(Spain) David Ferrer	5	Beijing, China	Hard	2R	6–3, 6–3	92
2010
3.	(United States) Andy Roddick	7	London, United Kingdom	Grass	3R	6–4, 7–6^{(10–8)}	63

== Record vs. No. 1 ranked players ==
Marat Safin (RUS) 0–1

Lleyton Hewitt (AUS) 0–4

Juan Carlos Ferrero (ESP) 0–4

Andy Roddick (USA) 1–1

Roger Federer (SUI) 0–2

Rafael Nadal (ESP) 0–3

Novak Djokovic (SRB) 0–2

Daniil Medvedev (RUS) 0–1

== See also ==
- List of select Jewish tennis players
