= 2015 Batman Cup – Doubles =

Doubles
- 2015 Batman Cup

Final
- Champion: (Russia) Aslan Karatsev (Belarus) Yaraslav Shyla
- Runner-up: (Croatia) Mate Pavić (New Zealand) Michael Venus
- Score: 7–6^{(7–4)}, 4–6, [10–5]

Events
Singles	Doubles
- Batman Cup

This is the first edition of the tournament.

Aslan Karatsev and Yaraslav Shyla won the title, defeating Mate Pavić and Michael Venus in the final, 7–6^{(7–4)}, 4–6, [10–5].

== Seeds ==
1. (Croatia) Mate Pavić / (New Zealand) Michael Venus (final)
2. (Moldova) Radu Albot / (Kazakhstan) Aleksandr Nedovyesov (quarterfinals)
3. (Russia) Konstantin Kravchuk / (Ukraine) Denys Molchanov (semifinals)
4. (India) Saketh Myneni / (United Kingdom) Sean Thornley (quarterfinals)

== Draw ==
Key

- Q = Qualifier
- WC = Wild card
- LL = Lucky loser
- Alt = Alternate
- ITF = ITF entry
- PR = Protected ranking
- SR = Special ranking
- SE = Special exempt
- JE = Junior exempt
- JR = Junior Accelerator Programme entrant
- CO = College Accelerator Programme entrant
- NG = Next Gen Accelerator Program entrant
- w/o = Walkover
- r = Retired
- d = Defaulted

First round
1	(Croatia) M Pavić (New Zealand) M Venus	6	7
WC	(Turkey) B Ergüden (Turkey) C İlkel	3	5
(Belarus) E Gerasimov (Russia) A Kudryavtsev
(Lithuania) L Grigelis (Lithuania) L Mugevičius	w/o
3	(Russia) K Kravchuk (Ukraine) D Molchanov	7^{7}	6
(Turkey) T Altuna (India) R Ramanathan	6^{5}	3
(Russia) E Donskoy (Australia) M Ebden	6	6
WC	(Turkey) S Ağabigün (Turkey) A Çelikbilek	3	4
(Bulgaria) D Kuzmanov (Bulgaria) A Lazov	6	4	[17]
WC	(Turkey) Barkın Yalçınkale (Turkey) A Yüksel	3	6	[15]
(Bosnia and Herzegovina) M Bašić (Bosnia and Herzegovina) T Brkić	3	1
4	(India) S Myneni (United Kingdom) S Thornley	6	6
(Russia) A Karatsev (Belarus) Y Shyla	6	6^{5}	[10]
(Belgium) N Desein (Italy) R Ghedin	3	7^{7}	[7]
(Slovakia) I Klec (Georgia (country)) A Metreveli	2	5
2	(Moldova) R Albot (Kazakhstan) A Nedovyesov	6	7

Quarterfinals
1	(Croatia) M Pavić (New Zealand) M Venus	6	6
(Lithuania) L Grigelis (Lithuania) L Mugevičius	1	4
3	(Russia) K Kravchuk (Ukraine) D Molchanov	3	6	[10]
(Russia) E Donskoy (Australia) M Ebden	6	3	[5]
(Bulgaria) D Kuzmanov (Bulgaria) A Lazov	3	7^{9}	[10]
4	(India) S Myneni (United Kingdom) S Thornley	6	6^{7}	[7]
(Russia) A Karatsev (Belarus) Y Shyla	6	6
2	(Moldova) R Albot (Kazakhstan) A Nedovyesov	4	3

Semifinals
1	(Croatia) M Pavić (New Zealand) M Venus	6	7^{8}
3	(Russia) K Kravchuk (Ukraine) D Molchanov	3	6^{6}
(Bulgaria) D Kuzmanov (Bulgaria) A Lazov	2	6	[7]
(Russia) A Karatsev (Belarus) Y Shyla	6	4	[10]

Final
1	(Croatia) M Pavić (New Zealand) M Venus	6^{4}	6	[5]
(Russia) A Karatsev (Belarus) Y Shyla	7^{7}	4	[10]
