= 2013 Tashkent Challenger – Singles =

Singles
- 2013 Tashkent Challenger

Final
- Champion: (Israel) Dudi Sela
- Runner-up: (Russia) Teymuraz Gabashvili
- Score: 6–1, 6–2

Events
Singles	Doubles
← 2012 ·	Tashkent Challenger	· 2014 →

Uladzimir Ignatik was the defending champion, but lost to Radu Albot in the first round.
Dudi Sela won the title defeating Teymuraz Gabashvili in the final 6–1, 6–2.

== Seeds ==
1. (Slovakia) Lukáš Lacko (semifinals)
2. (Russia) Evgeny Donskoy (quarterfinals)
3. (Israel) Dudi Sela (champion)
4. (Ukraine) Sergiy Stakhovsky (second round)
5. (France) Stéphane Robert (second round)
6. (Russia) Teymuraz Gabashvili (final)
7. (Ukraine) Oleksandr Nedovyesov (quarterfinals)
8. (Switzerland) Marco Chiudinelli (second round)

== Draw ==
=== Key ===
- Q = Qualifier
- WC = Wild card
- LL = Lucky loser
- Alt = Alternate
- SE = Special exempt
- PR = Protected ranking
- ITF = ITF entry
- JE = Junior exempt
- w/o = Walkover
- r = Retired
- d = Defaulted
- SR = Special ranking

=== Finals ===
Semifinals
1	(Slovakia) Lukáš Lacko	7	6^{4}	3
3	(Israel) Dudi Sela	5	7^{7}	6
(Israel) Amir Weintraub	6^{1}	4
6	(Russia) Teymuraz Gabashvili	7^{7}	6

Final
3	(Israel) Dudi Sela	6	6
6	(Russia) Teymuraz Gabashvili	1	2

=== Top half ===
First round
1	(Slovakia) L Lacko	6	6
(Chinese Taipei) T Chen	2	2
Q	(France) L Pouille	7^{7}	6
WC	(Uzbekistan) S Fayziev	6^{2}	4
(Uzbekistan) F Dustov	7^{7}	6^{0}	6
(Italy) L Giustino	6^{4}	7^{7}	0
WC	(Uzbekistan) Shonigmatjon Shofayziyev	2	4
5	(France) S Robert	6	6
3	(Israel) D Sela	7	6
(Czech Republic) R Jebavý	5	3
(Russia) V Rudnev	3	3
Q	(South Korea) Y-K Lim	6	6
(Italy) A Arnaboldi	6^{6}	7	5
Q	(Thailand) D Udomchoke	7^{8}	5	7
(Italy) T Fabbiano	2	4
7	(Ukraine) O Nedovyesov	6	6

Second round
1	(Slovakia) L Lacko	6	3	6
Q	(France) L Pouille	2	6	2
(Uzbekistan) F Dustov	6	6
5	(France) S Robert	3	4
3	(Israel) D Sela	6	6
Q	(South Korea) Y-K Lim	4	3
Q	(Thailand) D Udomchoke	6^{3}	1
7	(Ukraine) O Nedovyesov	7^{7}	6

Quarterfinals
1	(Slovakia) L Lacko	3	6	6
(Uzbekistan) F Dustov	6	3	3
3	(Israel) D Sela	6	6
7	(Ukraine) O Nedovyesov	2	2

Semifinals
1	(Slovakia) L Lacko	7	6^{4}	3
3	(Israel) D Sela	5	7^{7}	6

=== Bottom half ===
First round
8	(Switzerland) M Chiudinelli	6	6
WC	(Uzbekistan) D Karimov	1	2
Q	(Uzbekistan) S Ikramov	2	1
(Israel) A Weintraub	6	6
(Tunisia) M Jaziri	2	6	7^{8}
(Russia) K Kravchuk	6	3	6^{6}
WC	(Uzbekistan) T Ismailov	3	2
4	(Ukraine) S Stakhovsky	6	6
6	(Russia) T Gabashvili	6	6
(Russia) V Baluda	2	1
(Belarus) U Ignatik	6	4	3
(Moldova) R Albot	2	6	6
(Czech Republic) J Mertl	4	6^{2}
(Spain) E López Pérez	6	7^{7}
(Russia) A Kudryavtsev	5^{r}
2	(Russia) E Donskoy	6

Second round
8	(Switzerland) M Chiudinelli	1	3
(Israel) A Weintraub	6	6
(Tunisia) M Jaziri	6	6
4	(Ukraine) S Stakhovsky	4	2
6	(Russia) T Gabashvili	6	7
(Moldova) R Albot	3	5
(Spain) E López Pérez	5	0
2	(Russia) E Donskoy	7	6

Quarterfinals
(Israel) A Weintraub	w/o
(Tunisia) M Jaziri
6	(Russia) T Gabashvili	6	3	6
2	(Russia) E Donskoy	2	6	3

Semifinals
(Israel) A Weintraub	6^{1}	4
6	(Russia) T Gabashvili	7^{7}	6
