= 2011 Sony Ericsson Open – Men's singles qualifying =

Men's singles qualifying
- 2011 Sony Ericsson Open

Events
Singles	men	women
Doubles	men	women
← 2010 ·	Sony Ericsson Open	· 2012 →

This article displays the qualifying draw of the 2011 Sony Ericsson Open.

== Players ==
=== Seeds ===
1. (Bulgaria) Grigor Dimitrov (qualified)
2. (Germany) Rainer Schüttler (qualified)
3. (United States) Robert Kendrick (qualified)
4. (Israel) Dudi Sela (first round)
5. (Argentina) Brian Dabul (first round)
6. (United States) Michael Russell (qualified)
7. (Argentina) Horacio Zeballos (first round)
8. (Italy) Simone Bolelli (qualifying competition)
9. (Ukraine) Illya Marchenko (first round)
10. (Colombia) Alejandro Falla (first round)
11. (Russia) Igor Kunitsyn (qualified)
12. (United States) Ryan Sweeting (qualified)
13. (Germany) Björn Phau (qualifying competition)
14. (Poland) Michał Przysiężny (first round)
15. (France) Arnaud Clément (first round)
16. (Belgium) Olivier Rochus (qualified)
17. (Turkey) Marsel İlhan (qualified)
18. (Brazil) João Souza (first round)
19. (Germany) Julian Reister (qualifying competition)
20. (United States) Alex Bogomolov Jr. (qualified)
21. (Australia) Marinko Matosevic (qualifying competition)
22. (Czech Republic) Lukáš Rosol (qualifying competition)
23. (France) Éric Prodon (qualifying competition)
24. (Slovenia) Grega Žemlja (qualifying competition)

=== Qualifiers ===
1. (Bulgaria) Grigor Dimitrov
2. (Germany) Rainer Schüttler
3. (United States) Robert Kendrick
4. (Belgium) Olivier Rochus
5. (United States) Donald Young
6. (United States) Michael Russell
7. (Italy) Paolo Lorenzi
8. (United States) Alex Bogomolov Jr.
9. (Turkey) Marsel İlhan
10. (Chile) Paul Capdeville
11. (Russia) Igor Kunitsyn
12. (United States) Ryan Sweeting

== Qualifying draw ==
=== Key ===
- Q = Qualifier
- WC = Wild card
- LL = Lucky loser
- Alt = Alternate
- SE = Special exempt
- PR = Protected ranking
- ITF = ITF entry
- JE = Junior exempt
- w/o = Walkover
- r = Retired
- d = Defaulted
- SR = Special ranking

=== First qualifier ===
First round
1	(Bulgaria) Grigor Dimitrov	6	7^{7}
(South Africa) Rik de Voest	4	6^{2}
WC	(Chile) Nicolás Massú	6	6
14	(Poland) Michał Przysiężny	4	4

Qualifying competition
1	(Bulgaria) Grigor Dimitrov	6	6
WC	(Chile) Nicolás Massú	2	3

=== Second qualifier ===
First round
2	(Germany) Rainer Schüttler	6	3	6
(United States) Bobby Reynolds	1	6	4
(Spain) Iván Navarro	3	2
24	(Slovenia) Grega Žemlja	6	6

Qualifying competition
2	(Germany) Rainer Schüttler	6	6
24	(Slovenia) Grega Žemlja	3	4

=== Third qualifier ===
First round
3	(United States) Robert Kendrick	6	7^{7}
(Croatia) Franko Škugor	2	6^{3}
WC	(United States) Alexander Domijan	2	3
19	(Germany) Julian Reister	6	6

Qualifying competition
3	(United States) Robert Kendrick	6^{6}	7	6
19	(Germany) Julian Reister	7^{8}	5	0

=== Fourth qualifier ===
First round
4	(Israel) Dudi Sela	1	4
(United States) Tim Smyczek	6	6
(Italy) Flavio Cipolla	3	2
16	(Belgium) Olivier Rochus	6	6

Qualifying competition
(United States) Tim Smyczek	4	6	2
16	(Belgium) Olivier Rochus	6	3	6

=== Fifth qualifier ===
First round
5	(Argentina) Brian Dabul	6^{3}	1
(Canada) Frank Dancevic	7^{7}	6
(United States) Donald Young	2	6	6
15	(France) Arnaud Clément	6	3	2

Qualifying competition
(Canada) Frank Dancevic	1	6	5
(United States) Donald Young	6	1	7

=== Sixth qualifier ===
First round
6	(United States) Michael Russell	6	6
(Switzerland) Stéphane Bohli	4	4
WC	(United States) Jordan Cox	0	2
21	(Australia) Marinko Matosevic	6	6

Qualifying competition
6	(United States) Michael Russell	6	6
21	(Australia) Marinko Matosevic	2	2

=== Seventh qualifier ===
First round
7	(Argentina) Horacio Zeballos	2	2
(Spain) Daniel Muñoz-de la Nava	6	6
(Italy) Paolo Lorenzi	6	6
18	(Brazil) João Souza	4	2

Qualifying competition
(Spain) Daniel Muñoz-de la Nava	7	4	2
(Italy) Paolo Lorenzi	5	6	6

=== Eighth qualifier ===
First round
8	(Italy) Simone Bolelli	6	6
(South Africa) Izak van der Merwe	2	3
WC	(United States) Jesse Levine	5	6	3
20	(United States) Alex Bogomolov Jr.	7	3	6

Qualifying competition
8	(Italy) Simone Bolelli	7^{12}	2	3
20	(United States) Alex Bogomolov Jr.	6^{10}	6	6

=== Ninth qualifier ===
First round
9	(Ukraine) Illya Marchenko	6	3	3
(Colombia) Robert Farah	1	6	6
(Australia) Matthew Ebden	6	3	4
17	(Turkey) Marsel İlhan	1	6	6

Qualifying competition
(Colombia) Robert Farah	4	7	5
17	(Turkey) Marsel İlhan	6	5	7

=== Tenth qualifier ===
First round
10	(Colombia) Alejandro Falla	5	6^{5}
(Chile) Paul Capdeville	7	7
(Netherlands) Igor Sijsling	6	2	2
13	(Germany) Björn Phau	4	6	6

Qualifying competition
(Chile) Paul Capdeville	6	6
13	(Germany) Björn Phau	4	3

=== Eleventh qualifier ===
First round
11	(Russia) Igor Kunitsyn	6	6
(Australia) Carsten Ball	1	1
(Colombia) Carlos Salamanca	2	0
23	(France) Éric Prodon	6	6

Qualifying competition
11	(Russia) Igor Kunitsyn	6	7
23	(France) Éric Prodon	3	5

=== Twelfth qualifier ===
First round
12	(United States) Ryan Sweeting	7^{7}	6
(Colombia) Juan Sebastián Cabal	6^{4}	2
WC	(Portugal) Gastão Elias	5	3
22	(Czech Republic) Lukáš Rosol	7	6

Qualifying competition
12	(United States) Ryan Sweeting	6	6
22	(Czech Republic) Lukáš Rosol	4	1
