= Ağrı Challenger =

Defunct tennis tournament
- Abolished: 2015
- Location: Ağrı, Turkey
- Venue: Ağrı İbrahim Çeçen University
- Category: ATP Challenger Tour
- Surface: Hard
- Draw: 32S/8Q/16D
- Prize money: €42,500+H

The Ağrı Challenger was a professional tennis tournament played on outdoor hard courts. It was part of the ATP Challenger Tour, and its only edition was held in October 2015.

== Past finals ==
=== Singles ===
Year	Champion	Runner-up	Score
2015	(Uzbekistan) Farrukh Dustov	(India) Saketh Myneni	6–4, 6–4

=== Doubles ===
Year	Champions	Runners-up	Score
2015	(Russia) Konstantin Kravchuk (Ukraine) Denys Molchanov	(Russia) Alexandr Igoshin (Belarus) Yaraslav Shyla	6–3, 7–6^{(7–4)}
