= Yaraslav Shyla =

Belarusian tennis player

Yaraslav Shyla Яраслаў Шыла
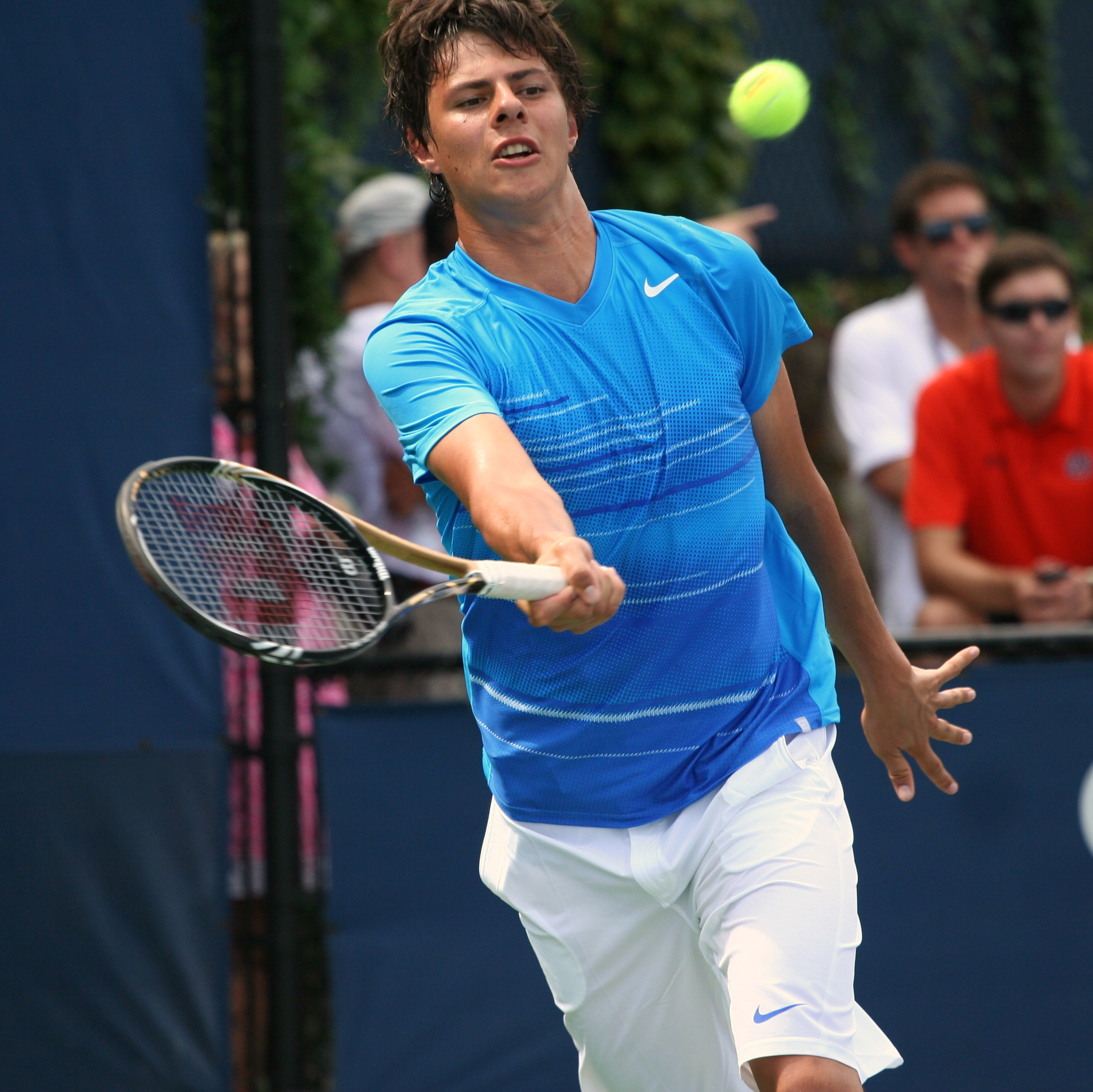
- Country (sports): Belarus
- Residence: Minsk, Belarus
- Born: 5 March 1993 (age 33) Minsk, Belarus
- Height: 1.93 m (6 ft 4 in)
- Turned pro: 2011
- Plays: Right-handed (two handed-backhand)
- Coach: Yahor Yatsyk
- Prize money: $141,623

Singles
- Career record: 3-4 (at ATP Tour level, Grand Slam level, and in Davis Cup)
- Career titles: 0
- Highest ranking: No. 306 (22 June 2015)
- Current ranking: No. 1,667 (17 November 2025)

Doubles
- Career record: 2-1 (at ATP Tour level, Grand Slam level, and in Davis Cup)
- Career titles: 0
- Highest ranking: No. 164 (15 June 2015)
- Current ranking: No. 2,313 (17 November 2015)

Team competitions
- Davis Cup: 5-4
- Last updated on: 17 November 2025.

Yaraslav Iharavich Shyla (Belarusian: Яраслаў Ігаравіч Шыла; Russian: Ярослав Игоревич Шило; born 5 March 1993 in Minsk) is a Belarusian tennis player.

Shyla has a career high ATP singles ranking of 306 achieved on 22 June 2015. He also has a career high ATP doubles ranking of 164 achieved on 15 June 2015.

Shyla won his first Challenger title of any kind in the doubles event at the 2015 Batman Cup, partnering Aslan Karatsev, defeating Mate Pavić and Michael Venus in the final.

== ITF finals (37-21) ==
=== Singles (5-6) ===
Legend Challenger Futures	Finals by surface Hard (3–4) Clay (1–1) Grass (0–0) Carpet (1–1)

Result	No.	Date	Tournament	Surface	Opponent	Score
Runner-up	1.	8 March 2014	Kazakhstan F2 Futures	Hard (I)	(Russia) Andrey Rublev	4–6, 6–3, 3–6
Runner-up	2.	28 June 2014	Kazakhstan F8 Futures	Hard (O)	(Uzbekistan) Temur Ismailov	4–6, 1–6
Winner	3.	28 September 2014	France F20 Futures	Carpet (I)	(Germany) Florian Fallert	6–2, 6–3
Runner-up	4.	25 April 2015	Kazakhstan F3 Futures	Clay (O)	(Uzbekistan) Temur Ismailov	6-7(2), 1–6
Winner	5.	2 May 2015	Kazakhstan F4 Futures	Clay (O)	(Estonia) Vladimir Ivanov	6–4, 6–3
Winner	6.	13 August 2016	Belarus F1 Futures	Hard (O)	(Belarus) Dzmitry Zhyrmont	6–4, 6–1
Winner	7.	20 August 2016	Belarus F2 Futures	Hard (O)	(Belarus) Dzmitry Zhyrmont	6–4, 7–5
Runner-up	8.	15 January 2017	Germany F1 Futures	Carpet (I)	(Russia) Evgeny Karlovskiy	6–2, 4–6, 4–6
Winner	9.	19 March 2017	Greece F2 Futures	Hard (O)	(Czech Republic) Vít Kopřiva	6–3, 6–3
Runner-up	10.	26 November 2017	Greece F10 Futures	Hard (O)	(France) Yannick Jankovits	1–6, 5–7
Runner-up	11.	28 April 2018	Uzbekistan F2 Futures	Hard (O)	(India) Saketh Myneni	6–4, 3–6, 6-7(4)

=== Doubles (32-15) ===
Legend Challenger Futures	Finals by surface Hard (23–11) Clay (9–3) Grass (0–0) Carpet (0–1)

Result	No.	Date	Tournament	Surface	Partner	Opponent	Score
Runner-up	1.	26 November 2011	Kazakhstan F7 Futures	Hard (I)	(Belarus) Egor Gerasimov	(Russia) Vitaliy Kachanovskiy (Russia) Sergei Krotiouk	6-7(1), 1–6
Runner-up	2.	10 March 2012	Ukraine F3 Futures	Hard (I)	(Ukraine) Denys Pume	(Ukraine) Vladyslav Manafov (Ukraine) Volodymyr Uzhylovskyi	4–6, 4–6
Winner	3.	20 April 2012	Uzbekistan F1 Futures	Hard (O)	(Ukraine) Vladyslav Manafov	(Russia) Fedor Chervyakov (Kyrgyzstan) Daniiar Duldaev	6–3, 4–6, [10-4]
Runner-up	4.	28 April 2012	Uzbekistan F2 Futures	Hard (O)	(Ukraine) Vladyslav Manafov	(Belarus) Uladzimir Ignatik (Latvia) Deniss Pavlovs	4–6, 2–6
Winner	5.	9 September 2012	Georgia F1 Futures	Clay (O)	(Ukraine) Vladyslav Manafov	(Estonia) Vladimir Ivanov (Russia) Ilia Shatskiy	6–1, 7-6(3)
Winner	6.	15 September 2012	Georgia F2 Futures	Clay (O)	(Ukraine) Vladyslav Manafov	(Georgia (country)) Nodar Itonishvili (Georgia (country)) David Kvernadze	6–2, 6–4
Runner-up	7.	30 March 2013	Turkey F12 Futures	Hard (O)	(Russia) Kirill Dmitriev	(Argentina) Maximiliano Estévez (Brazil) Thiago Monteiro	7–5, 2–6, [6-10]
Runner-up	8.	14 July 2013	Bulgaria F7 Futures	Clay (O)	(Russia) Andrey Rublev	(Bulgaria) Aleksandar Lazov (Chile) Laslo Urrutia Fuentes	6–4, 3–6, [8-10]
Runner-up	9.	3 August 2013	Lithuania F1 Futures	Clay (O)	(Ukraine) Ivan Anikanov	(Lithuania) Laurynas Grigelis (Italy) Giuseppe Menga	5–7, 3–6
Winner	10.	17 August 2013	Belarus F1 Futures	Hard (O)	(Belarus) Andrei Vasilevski	(France) Jules Marie (France) Fabrice Martin	6–4, 7-6(2)
Runner-up	11.	26 October 2013	Kazakhstan F8 Futures	Hard (O)	(Belarus) Vladzimir Kruk	(Belarus) Sergey Betov (Belarus) Aliaksandr Bury	7–5, 2–6, [3-10]
Winner	12.	22 February 2014	Russia F1 Futures	Hard (I)	(Belarus) Andrei Vasilevski	(Russia) Anton Galkin (Russia) Ilya Lebedev	7–5, 4–6, [10-8]
Winner	13.	1 March 2014	Kazakhstan F1 Futures	Hard (I)	(Belarus) Andrei Vasilevski	(Georgia (country)) Aleksandre Metreveli (Kazakhstan) Denis Yevseyev	6–3, 3–6, [12-10]
Winner	14.	8 March 2014	Kazakhstan F2 Futures	Hard (I)	(Belarus) Andrei Vasilevski	(Russia) Ilya Lebedev (Russia) Dmitry Surchenko	6–3, 5–7, [10-4]
Winner	15.	15 March 2014	Kazakhstan F3 Futures	Hard (I)	(Belarus) Andrei Vasilevski	(Russia) Mikhail Fufygin (Uzbekistan) Shonigmatjon Shofayziyev	6–4, 6–3
Runner-up	16.	5 April 2014	Kazakhstan F4 Futures	Clay (O)	(Belarus) Andrei Vasilevski	(Russia) Kirill Dmitriev (Russia) Andrei Plotniy	6–4, 4–6, [12-14]
Winner	17.	12 April 2014	Kazakhstan F5 Futures	Clay (O)	(Belarus) Andrei Vasilevski	(Ukraine) Dmytro Badanov (Russia) Yan Sabanin	6–2, 6–2
Winner	18.	19 April 2014	Kazakhstan F6 Futures	Clay (O)	(Belarus) Andrei Vasilevski	(Estonia) Vladimir Ivanov (Russia) Ivan Nedelko	7-6(6), 6–0
Winner	19.	28 June 2014	Kazakhstan F8 Futures	Hard (O)	(Belarus) Andrei Vasilevski	(Russia) Mikhail Fufygin (Uzbekistan) Shonigmatjon Shofayziyev	6–4, 6–3
Runner-up	20.	5 July 2014	Kazakhstan F9 Futures	Hard (O)	(Belarus) Andrei Vasilevski	(Russia) Mikhail Fufygin (Uzbekistan) Shonigmatjon Shofayziyev	3–6, 7–5, [6-10]
Winner	21.	24 January 2015	Kazakhstan F1 Futures	Hard (I)	(Belarus) Andrei Vasilevski	(Russia) Mikhail Elgin (Russia) Karen Khachanov	3–6, 7-6(2), [10-4]
Winner	22.	31 January 2015	Kazakhstan F2 Futures	Hard (I)	(Belarus) Andrei Vasilevski	(Russia) Evgenii Tiurnev (Russia) Anton Zaitcev	7-6(5), 7-6(5)
Winner	23.	8 March 2015	Tunisia F8 Futures	Hard (O)	(Belarus) Andrei Vasilevski	(Italy) Claudio Grassi (United Kingdom) David Rice	6–3, 4–6, [10-6]
Winner	24.	12 April 2015	Batman Cup, Turkey	Hard (O)	(Russia) Aslan Karatsev	(Croatia) Mate Pavic (New Zealand) Michael Venus	7-6(4), 4–6, [10-5]
Winner	25.	25 April 2015	Kazakhstan F3 Futures	Clay (O)	(Belarus) Andrei Vasilevski	(Russia) Ivan Gakhov (Russia) Evgenii Tiurnev	4–6, 6–3, [10-6]
Winner	26.	2 May 2015	Kazakhstan F4 Futures	Clay (O)	(Belarus) Andrei Vasilevski	(Estonia) Vladimir Ivanov (Ukraine) Volodymyr Uzhylovskyi	6–2, 7-6(4)
Winner	27.	5 September 2015	Russia F7 Futures	Clay (O)	(Ukraine) Denys Molchanov	(Kazakhstan) Alexander Bublik (Russia) Richard Muzaev	6–2, 7-6(3)
Runner-up	28.	4 October 2015	Ağrı Challenger, Turkey	Hard (O)	(Russia) Alexander Igoshin	(Russia) Konstantin Kravchuk (Ukraine) Denys Molchanov	3–6, 6-7(4)
Winner	29.	17 October 2015	Kazakhstan F6 Futures	Clay (O)	(Russia) Ivan Gakhov	(Russia) Alexander Boborykin (Russia) Timur Kiyamov	6–3, 6–3
Winner	30.	14 November 2015	Turkey F45 Futures	Clay (O)	(Belarus) Yahor Yatsyk	(Germany) Marvin Netuschil (Germany) Philipp Scholz	6–3, 6–4
Winner	31.	23 January 2016	Kazakhstan F1 Futures	Hard (I)	(Belarus) Andrei Vasilevski	(Russia) Evgeny Karlovskiy (Russia) Denis Matsukevitch	6–3, 6–2
Winner	32.	30 January 2016	Kazakhstan F2 Futures	Hard (I)	(Belarus) Andrei Vasilevski	(Uzbekistan) Sanjar Fayziev (Kazakhstan) Timur Khabibulin	4–6, 6–4, [12-10]
Winner	33.	4 June 2016	Uzbekistan F4 Futures	Hard (O)	(Kazakhstan) Timur Khabibulin	(Chinese Taipei) Ti Chen (Russia) Denis Matsukevitch	6–3, 6–3
Winner	34.	31 July 2016	President's Cup, Kazakhstan	Hard (O)	(Belarus) Andrei Vasilevski	(Russia) Mikhail Elgin (Russia) Alexander Kudryavtsev	6–4, 6–4
Winner	35.	13 August 2016	Belarus F1 Futures	Hard (O)	(Belarus) Dzmitry Zhyrmont	(Russia) Markos Kalovelonis (Bulgaria) Vasko Mladenov	7-6(8), 6–3
Winner	36.	20 August 2016	Belarus F2 Futures	Hard (O)	(Belarus) Dzmitry Zhyrmont	(United Kingdom) Scott Clayton (United Kingdom) Jonny O'Mara	7–5, 7-6(1)
Runner-up	37.	15 January 2017	Germany F1 Futures	Carpet (I)	(Russia) Evgeny Karlovskiy	(Sweden) Isak Arvidsson (Sweden) Patrik Rosenholm	6-7(5), 6–3, [8-10]
Runner-up	38.	26 March 2017	Greece F3 Futures	Hard (O)	(Belarus) Dzmitry Zhyrmont	(Chile) Marcelo Tomas Barrios Vera (France) Benjamin Bonzi	6–4, 6-7(5), [7-10]
Winner	39.	12 August 2017	Belarus F1 Futures	Hard (O)	(Ukraine) Vladyslav Manafov	(United Kingdom) Jonathan Gray (Croatia) Fran Zvonimir Zgombic	6–2, 7–5
Winner	40.	26 August 2017	Belarus F3 Futures	Hard (O)	(Ukraine) Vladyslav Manafov	(Belarus) Ivan Liutarevich (Ukraine) Vadym Ursu	6–3, 2–6, [10-4]
Winner	41.	2 September 2017	Italy F27 Futures	Hard (O)	(Italy) Riccardo Ghedin	(Italy) Erik Crepaldi (Croatia) Fran Zvonimir Zgombic	7-6(4), 2–6, [10-6]
Runner-up	42.	19 November 2017	Greece F9 Futures	Hard (O)	(Turkey) Altug Celikbilek	(Italy) Marco Bortolotti (United States) Miles Seemann	6-7(1), 6–4, [7-10]
Runner-up	43.	10 March 2018	Russia F2 Futures	Hard (I)	(Belarus) Aliaksandr Liaonenka	(Russia) Alexander Pavlioutchenkov (Russia) Evgenii Tiurnev	4–6, 5–7
Winner	44.	1 April 2018	Greece F5 Futures	Hard (O)	(Russia) Markos Kalovelonis	(Italy) Erik Crepaldi (Czech Republic) Petr Michnev	6–4, 7-6(5)
Winner	45.	2 June 2018	Uzbekistan F3 Futures	Hard (O)	(Belarus) Sergey Betov	(Russia) Konstantin Kravchuk (Russia) Roman Safiullin	6–4, 7-6(2)
Winner	46.	21 July 2018	President's Cup, Kazakhstan	Hard (O)	(Russia) Mikhail Elgin	(India) Arjun Kadhe (Kazakhstan) Denis Yevseyev	7–5, 7-6(6)
Runner-up	47.	4 August 2018	Chengdu Challenger, China	Hard (O)	(Russia) Mikhail Elgin	(China) Mao-Xin Gong (China) Ze Zhang	4–6, 4–6
