= Aslan Karatsev =

Russian tennis player

Aslan Karatsev Аслан Карацев
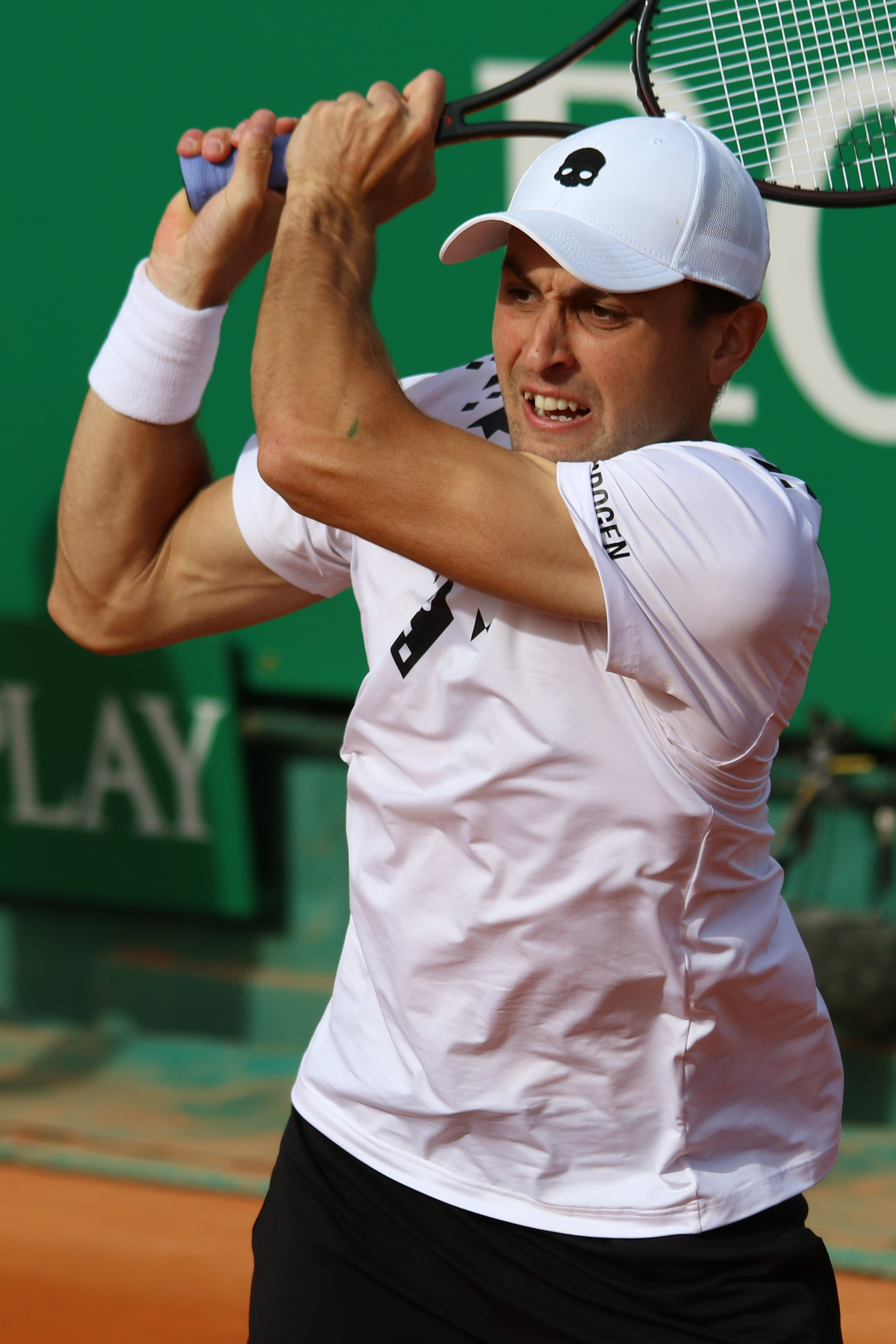
- Karatsev at the 2022 Monte-Carlo Masters
- Country (sports): Russia
- Residence: Moscow, Russia
- Born: 4 September 1993 (age 33) Vladikavkaz, Russia
- Height: 1.85 m (6 ft 1 in)
- Turned pro: 2011
- Plays: Right-handed (two-handed backhand)
- Coach: Vladimir Polyakov
- Prize money: US $5,386,717

Singles
- Career record: 79–88
- Career titles: 3
- Highest ranking: No. 14 (7 February 2022)

Grand Slam singles results
- Australian Open: SF (2021)
- French Open: 2R (2021, 2023)
- Wimbledon: 2R (2023)
- US Open: 3R (2021, 2023)

Other tournaments
- Tour Finals: Alt (2021)
- Olympic Games: 2R (2021)

Doubles
- Career record: 25–34
- Career titles: 1
- Highest ranking: No. 76 (16 May 2022)

Grand Slam doubles results
- Australian Open: 1R (2022, 2023)
- Wimbledon: 1R (2023)
- US Open: 2R (2022)

Other doubles tournaments
- Olympic Games: 1R (2021)

Grand Slam mixed doubles results
- French Open: F (2021)

Other mixed doubles tournaments
- Olympic Games: F (2021)

Team competitions
- Davis Cup: W (2021)
Medal record
Representing ROC
Olympic Games
Silver medal – second place	2020 Tokyo	Mixed doubles
Representing Russia
Men's Tennis
Summer Universiade
Gold medal – first place	2017 Taipei	Doubles
Silver medal – second place	2015 Gwangju	Singles
Bronze medal – third place	2015 Gwangju	Mixed doubles
Bronze medal – third place	2015 Gwangju	Men's Team
Bronze medal – third place	2017 Taipei	Men's Team
- Last updated on: 1 October 2026.

Aslan Kazbekovich Karatsev (Russian: Аслан Казбекович Карацев, Iron Ossetic: Хъарацаты Хъазыбеджы фырт Аслан; born 4 September 1993) is a Russian inactive professional tennis player. He has a career-high ATP singles ranking of world No. 14, achieved on 7 February 2022 and a best doubles ranking of No. 76, reached on 16 May 2022. He has won four ATP Tour titles combined, three in singles and one in doubles.

His biggest result is a silver medal in mixed doubles at the 2020 Summer Olympics, with Elena Vesnina.

Karatsev is known for his impressive campaign at 2021 Australian Open: In February, he passed through qualifiers and, on his first main draw of a Grand Slam major, he defeated seeds Diego Schwartzman, Félix Auger-Aliassime and Grigor Dimitrov to reach the semifinals in Melbourne. With that feat, he became the first man in the Open Era to reach the semifinals on his major debut.

== Early life ==
Karatsev was born in Vladikavkaz, Russia. His father Kazbek Karatsev is an ethnic Ossetian and former footballer, and his mother Svetlana Karatseva is a medical doctor. Aslan has an older sister named Zarina. Karatsev's grandfather on his mother's side is Jewish.

When Karatsev was three years old he and his parents moved to Israel, making aliyah, and they lived in Israel for the next nine years. He started playing tennis there, in Tel Aviv. His first coach was Vladimir Rabinovich. His mother and sister live in Holon, Israel. Karatsev speaks fluent Hebrew, and says that Israel still feels like home.

When he was 12, he moved back to Russia, with his father, because of funding limitations in Israel. He moved to Taganrog where his new coaches were Alexandr Kuprin and Ivan Potapov. From 2011 to 2013 he was coached by Andrey Kesarev.

Karatsev fluently speaks Russian, Hebrew, and English, and holds dual Russian-Israeli citizenship.

== Junior career ==
In 2007, Karatsev played his first junior match, at the age of 14, at a Grade-5 tournament in Russia. Although being his debut, it would be his only appearance until May 2009, where he started to play consistently at junior-level competitions across his country. He has won multiple U-14 tennis events all over Russia.

Karatsev had mixed results on ITF junior circuit, being less successful at international jr. events. He made his major jr. debut at the 2011 French Open, where he qualified for the main draw but lost in the first round. He then played at 2011 Wimbledon Championships, but was defeated again in the first round. Later that season, Karatsev played at the 2011 US Open, where he reached the second round. In doubles, the Russian partnered with compatriot and friend Evgeny Karlovskiy in most jr. events, including all four majors. Their best result was the quarterfinals at the 2011 French Open.

He reached an ITF junior combined ranking of No. 47 on 8 August 2011 and a win–loss record of 76–48 in singles and 26–16 in doubles.

Junior Grand Slam results – Singles:

French Open: 1R (2011)
Wimbledon: 1R (2011)
US Open: 2R (2011)

Junior Grand Slam results – Doubles:

French Open: QF (2011)
Wimbledon: 1R (2011)
US Open: 2R (2011)

== Professional career ==
=== 2013–20 ===
Karatsev made his ATP Tour main-draw debut at the 2013 St. Petersburg Open, where he received entry to the main draw due to a wildcard. In the first round, he lost to compatriot and second seed Mikhail Youzhny. In the doubles event, he partnered Dmitry Tursunov and they reached the semifinals, losing to Dominic Inglot and Denis Istomin in a narrow deciding tiebreaker. In 2015, he won his first main-draw match on the ATP Tour at the Kremlin Cup, defeating Youzhny.

According to his father, Karatsev at 19 was mentored by Dmitry Tursunov who traveled with him to Halle, Germany to train there for a couple of months but returned due to a lack of money to continue. Then, the German academy itself invited Aslan to return to Halle. He trained there for two years, then got injured and could not really play for two years because of the trauma. He moved to Barcelona where he played at the Bruguera Tennis Academy for less than two years.

After searching for better coaching opportunities in Spain and Germany, Karatsev in 2019 hired his new coach, Yahor Yatsyk from Minsk. Yatsyk, a former professional tennis player one year his senior, used to help Nikoloz Basilashvili as a coach. During the COVID-19 lockdown Karatsev played exhibition matches in the United States.

At St. Petersburg, Karatsev earned his first top-50 win against Tennys Sandgren.

=== 2021: Australian Open semifinalist, Olympic silver medal, top 15 ===
Karatsev made his Grand Slam debut at the Australian Open, after coming through qualifying by beating Brandon Nakashima, Max Purcell and Alexandre Müller. It was here that he also notched his first top-10 victory, after upsetting 8th seed and world No. 9, Diego Schwartzman. He also upset 20th seed Félix Auger-Aliassime after dropping the first two sets and coming back to win in five to become the first qualifier to reach a Grand Slam quarterfinal since Bernard Tomic at Wimbledon 2011, and the first man to reach a quarterfinal in his Grand Slam debut since Alex Rădulescu in 1996 Wimbledon. He then defeated the former No. 3 player Grigor Dimitrov in four sets to reach the semifinals. By doing this, Karatsev became the first qualifier to reach the semifinals of a Grand Slam since Vladimir Voltchkov in 2000 Wimbledon and the first to do so at the Australian Open since Bob Giltinan in 1977, the lowest-ranked player to reach a Grand Slam semifinal since Goran Ivanišević in 2001 Wimbledon, and the first player to reach a Grand Slam semifinal on debut in the Open Era history. There, he lost to world No. 1 and eventual champion, Novak Djokovic, in straight sets. His run at the tournament raised his ranking from 114 to a career-high of world No. 42.

Karatsev's next tournament was Doha, where he beat Mubarak Shannan Zayid in straight sets in the first round, but lost to top seed Dominic Thiem in the second round after taking the first set in a tiebreak. He entered the doubles draw with compatriot Andrey Rublev and reached the semifinals, where they defeated Jérémy Chardy and Fabrice Martin. In the final, they defeated Marcus Daniell and Philipp Oswald in straight sets. Winning the tournament raised his doubles ranking from No. 447 to a career-high of No. 222. In Dubai, he beat Egor Gerasimov, Dan Evans and Lorenzo Sonego to reach his first ATP 500 quarterfinal, where he beat Jannik Sinner in three sets to advance to his first ATP 500 semifinal. In the semifinal, Karatsev ended the 23-match winning streak of second seed Andrey Rublev at ATP 500 events to reach his first singles final. In the final, he defeated Lloyd Harris to win his first title. The win allowed Karatsev to break into the top 30 for the first time in his career. He has become the second Russian tennis player to win his maiden title at 27, a record shared with Igor Kunitsyn.

Seeded 19th in Indian Wells he reached the fourth round on his Masters 1000 career debut defeating qualifier Salvatore Caruso and ninth seed Denis Shapovalov. At the 2021 Miami Open on his debut at this tournament he reached also the third round.

At the Serbia Open, Karatsev avenged his loss at the Australian Open by defeating world No. 1, Novak Djokovic, to advance to the final in the longest match of 2021 thus far. He was then defeated by Matteo Berrettini in three sets.

Karatsev notched two more top-ten wins, beating Schwartzman again in Madrid, and compatriot Daniil Medvedev in Rome. At the French Open, Karatsev lost in men's singles to Philipp Kohlschreiber in the second round. However, he partnered with Elena Vesnina in mixed doubles, and on his debut advanced to the final, but the pair lost to Joe Salisbury and Desirae Krawczyk.

At the Tokyo Olympics, he won the silver medal in mixed doubles with Elena Vesnina losing to compatriots Andrey Rublev and Anastasia Pavlyuchenkova in the final. He also participated in the singles and doubles events where he reached the second and lost in the first round, respectively.

In his debut at a Masters-1000 level in doubles, Karatsev reached the quarterfinals at the National Bank Open in Toronto partnering with Dušan Lajović. As a result, he entered the top 200 in doubles at world No. 172, on 16 August 2021. In singles seeded 15th and having a first round bye, he lost in the second round to Karen Khachanov.

At the 2021 BNP Paribas Open in Indian Wells, he reached the fourth round at a Master 1000 for the first time in his career defeating 9th seed Denis Shapovalov before he lost to 8th seed Hubert Hurkacz. In doubles he reached the final with compatriot Rublev where they lost to Polasek/Peers. As a result, he reached the top 100 in the doubles rankings at World No. 92 on 18 October 2021.

At the 2021 Kremlin Cup in Moscow, Karatsev defeated compatriot Karen Khachanov in the semifinals to reach his third final of the season and in his career. He then defeated 6th seed Marin Čilić in the final to win his 2nd career title. With his successful run in Moscow, he made his debut in the top 20 in the rankings, rising to a ranking of World No. 19 on 25 October 2021.

On 8 November 2021, Karatsev peaked at world no. 15 and was named as the third alternate for the ATP Finals.

=== 2022: Sydney title, loss of form, match fixing allegations ===
Karatsev started his 2022 season at the Sydney Classic. As the top seed, he beat fifth seed and world No. 27, Lorenzo Sonego, in the quarterfinals. He then defeated third seed and world No. 26, Dan Evans, in the semifinals in a tight three-set match, to reach his fourth ATP singles final. He won his third ATP singles title by defeating Andy Murray in the final. Seeded 18th and last year semifinalist at the Australian Open, he lost in the third round to Adrian Mannarino in four sets.

After the Australian Open, Karatsev competed at the Maharashtra Open in Pune, India. As the top seed, he was eliminated from the tournament in the second round by qualifier Elias Ymer. Seeded seventh at the Rotterdam Open, he was beaten in the first round by Dutch wildcard Tallon Griekspoor, despite having two match points during the match. Seeded fourth at the Open 13, he reached the quarterfinals where he lost to ninth seed Benjamin Bonzi. Seeded seventh and the defending champion at the Dubai Championships, he was defeated in the first round by Mackenzie McDonald.

According to German TV ZDF, Karatsev, his coach Yahor Yatsyk and fellow tennis player Nikoloz Basilashvili were under investigation for possible involvement in match fixing. Karatsev made a statement saying he was 'unaware' of the allegations.

=== 2023: Maiden Masters semifinal, Second ATP 500 final, back to top 50 ===
At the 2023 Mutua Madrid Open he reached as a qualifier the fourth round for the first time at this tournament and only for the second time overall at a Masters level, defeating Laslo Djere, 23rd seed Botic van de Zandschulp and 16th seed Alex de Minaur. He then defeated second seed Daniil Medvedev to reach his maiden Masters quarterfinal. Next he reached the semifinals defeating Zhang Zhizhen. He became only the second qualifier to advance to the last four in the tournament history. As a result, he jumped back up close to 70 positions in the rankings to world No. 52.

At the 2023 Japan Open Tennis Championships he won his first round match with upset over previous year's finalist sixth seed Frances Tiafoe. Next he reached the semifinals defeating again Zhang Zhizhen and fourth seed Alex de Minaur. As a result, he returned to the top 40 on 23 October and the top 35 on 30 October 2023.

=== 2024–2026: Injury, hiatus ===
On 2 January 2024, Karatsev suffered a knee injury in the first round of the 2024 Brisbane International. He then underwent a surgery. It was reported that the injury was very serious and that Karatsev could be out for half a year.

At the Madrid Open at the end of April, he lost to Fábián Marozsán 6–7, 6–7 in the first round. He recorded his first win on clay for the season in May at the 2024 Italian Open over Mackenzie McDonald. His ranking of No. 92 as of 10 June 2024 was narrowly insufficient to qualify for the Olympics in Paris. In late July, at the 2024 Atlanta Open, Karatsev won in the first round before losing to Tiafoe in the next. Earlier in July, he had fallen out of the Top 100 but would briefly return within in August.

Later in the season, he missed the Japan Open, that time held in September. In October, he won the qualification at the Almaty Open but was stopped in the second round by Alexander Shevchenko. He then saw his runner-up points from the previous year's Japan Open expire, which caused him to drop 177 places in one week – from No. 139 to No. 316. He was out of the top 300 for the first time since July 2019. He finished the year as world No. 287.

He started the 2025 season with a victory at a Challenger 75 in Thailand, defeating then-No. 162 Grégoire Barrère in the final on 4 January. It was his first tournament win in almost three years, and he rose to No. 229 as the result. The rest of the year was not as successful, but nevertheless he returned to the top 200, before falling out again. After August, Karatsev took a break and finished the 2025 season as world No. 369.

In April 2026, he returned for one ITF М25 event in Egypt, winning in the first round after making it through the qualification rounds. In the second round, he retired at 1–2 in the first set.

== Performance timelines ==
Key
W	F	SF	QF	#R	RR	Q#	P#	DNQ	A	Z#	PO	G	S	B	NMS	NTI	P	NH

(W) winner; (F) finalist; (SF) semifinalist; (QF) quarterfinalist; (#R) rounds 4, 3, 2, 1; (RR) round-robin stage; (Q#) qualification round; (P#) preliminary round; (DNQ) did not qualify; (A) absent; (Z#) Davis/Fed Cup Zonal Group (with number indication) or (PO) play-off; (G) gold, (S) silver or (B) bronze Olympic/Paralympic medal; (NMS) not a Masters tournament; (NTI) not a Tier I tournament; (P) postponed; (NH) not held; (SR) strike rate (events won / competed); (W–L) win–loss record.
To avoid confusion and double counting, these charts are updated at the conclusion of a tournament or when the player's participation has ended.

=== Singles ===
Current through the 2023 Shanghai.

Tournament	2013	2014	2015	2016	2017	2018	2019	2020	2021	2022	2023	2024	SR	W–L
Grand Slam tournaments
Australian Open	A	A	Q1	Q2	A	A	A	A	SF	3R	1R	A	0 / 3	7–3
French Open	A	A	Q1	Q3	A	A	A	Q3	2R	1R	2R	1R	0 / 4	2–4
Wimbledon	A	Q1	Q2	A	A	A	A	NH	1R	A (Note: Russian athletes were banned from competing following the 2022 Russian invasion of Ukraine.)	2R	1R	0 / 3	1–3
US Open	A	A	Q3	Q1	A	A	A	A	3R	1R	3R	Q3	0 / 3	4–3
Win–loss	0–0	0–0	0–0	0–0	0–0	0–0	0–0	0–0	8–4	2–3	4–4	0–2	0 / 13	14–13
National representation
Davis Cup	A	A	A	Z1	A	A	A	W (Note: Edition is split into the two years due to the COVID-19 pandemic.)		A			1 / 2	0–1
ATP Masters 1000
Indian Wells Masters	A	A	A	A	A	A	A	NH	4R	2R	A	A	0 / 2	2–2
Miami Open	A	A	A	A	A	A	A	NH	3R	3R	A	A	0 / 2	2–2
Monte-Carlo Masters	A	A	A	A	A	A	A	NH	2R	1R	A	A	0 / 2	1–2
Madrid Open	A	A	A	A	A	A	A	NH	3R	1R	SF	1R	0 / 4	7–4
Italian Open	A	A	A	A	A	A	A	A	3R	2R	A	2R	0 / 3	4–3
Canadian Open	A	A	A	A	A	A	A	NH	2R	1R	1R	Q1	0 / 3	0–3
Cincinnati Masters	A	A	A	A	A	A	A	A	1R	2R	Q1	A	0 / 2	1–2
Shanghai Masters	A	A	A	A	A	A	Q1	NH			1R		0 / 1	0–1
Paris Masters	A	A	A	A	A	A	A	A	1R	1R			0 / 2	0–2
Win–loss	0–0	0–0	0–0	0–0	0–0	0–0	0–0	0–0	8–8	3–8	5–3	1–2	0 / 21	17–21
Career statistics
	2013	2014	2015	2016	2017	2018	2019	2020	2021	2022	2023	2024	Career	
Tournaments	2	1	1	2	0	0	0	3	22	30	19	5	85	
Titles	0	0	0	0	0	0	0	0	2	1	0		3	
Finals	0	0	0	0	0	0	0	0	3	1	0		4	
Overall win–loss	0–2	0–1	1–1	0–3	0–0	0–0	0–0	2–4	34–20	17–29	22–19	2–5	78–86	
Win %	0%	0%	50%	0%	–	–	–	33%	63%	37%	54%	29%	47.56%	
Year-end ranking	292	218	195	235	621	485	289	112	18	59	35	287	$5,140,564	

=== Doubles ===
Tournament	2013	2014	2015	2016	2017	2018	2019	2020	2021	2022	2023	2024	SR	W–L
Grand Slam tournaments
Australian Open	A	A	A	A	A	A	A	A	A	1R	1R		0 / 2	0–2
French Open	A	A	A	A	A	A	A	A	A	A	A		0 / 0	0–0
Wimbledon	A	A	A	A	A	A	A	NH	A	A	1R		0 / 1	0–1
US Open	A	A	A	A	A	A	A	A	1R	2R	1R		0 / 3	1–3
Win–loss	0–0	0–0	0–0	0–0	0–0	0–0	0–0	0–0	0–1	1–2	0–3		0 / 6	1–6
Career statistics
Tournaments	2	0	1	0	1	0	0	0	9	13	4		30	
Titles	0	0	0	0	0	0	0	0	1	0			1	
Finals	0	0	0	0	0	0	0	0	2	0			2	
Overall win–loss	2–2	0–0	1–1	0–0	0–1	0–0	0–0	0–0	14–12	6–12	0–4		24–32	
Year-end ranking	402	441	248	618	728	–	408	422	90	180	585		45%	

== Grand Slam tournaments finals ==
=== Mixed doubles: 1 (runner-up) ===
Result	Year	Tournament	Surface	Partner	Opponents	Score
Loss	2021	French Open	Clay	(Russia) Elena Vesnina	(United States) Desirae Krawczyk (United Kingdom) Joe Salisbury	6–2, 4–6, [5–10]

== Other significant finals ==
=== Summer Olympics ===
==== Mixed doubles: 1 (silver medal) ====
Result	Year	Tournament	Surface	Partner	Opponents	Score
Silver	2021	2020 Olympics, Japan	Hard	(Russia) Elena Vesnina	(Russia) Anastasia Pavlyuchenkova (Russia) Andrey Rublev	3–6, 7–6^{(7–5)}, [11–13]

=== ATP 1000 tournaments ===
==== Doubles: 1 (runner-up) ====
Result	Year	Tournament	Surface	Partner	Opponents	Score
Loss	2021	Indian Wells Masters	Hard	(Russia) Andrey Rublev	(Australia) John Peers (Slovakia) Filip Polášek	3–6, 6–7^{(5–7)}

== Other finals ==
=== Universiade ===
==== Singles: 1 (silver medal) ====
Result	Year	Tournament	Surface	Opponent	Score
Silver	2015	Gwangju Universiade	Hard (i)	(South Korea) Chung Hyeon	6–1, 2–6, 0–6

== ATP Tour finals ==
=== Singles: 5 (3 titles, 2 runner-ups) ===
Legend Grand Slam (–) ATP 1000 (–) ATP 500 (1–1) ATP 250 (2–1)	Finals by surface Hard (3–1) Clay (0–1) Grass (–)	Finals by setting Outdoor (2–2) Indoor (1–0)

Result	W–L	Date	Tournament	Tier	Surface	Opponent	Score
Win	1–0	Mar 2021	Dubai Championships, UAE	ATP 500	Hard	(South Africa) Lloyd Harris	6–3, 6–2
Loss	1–1	Apr 2021	Serbia Open, Serbia	ATP 250	Clay	(Italy) Matteo Berrettini	1–6, 6–3, 6–7^{(0–7)}
Win	2–1	Oct 2021	Kremlin Cup, Russia	ATP 250	Hard (i)	(Croatia) Marin Čilić	6–2, 6–4
Win	3–1	Jan 2022	Sydney International, Australia	ATP 250	Hard	(United Kingdom) Andy Murray	6–3, 6–3
Loss	3–2	Oct 2023	Japan Open, Japan	ATP 500	Hard	(United States) Ben Shelton	5–7, 1–6

=== Doubles: 2 (1 title, 1 runner-up) ===
Legend Grand Slam (–) ATP 1000 (0–1) ATP 500 (–) ATP 250 (1–0)	Finals by surface Hard (1–1) Clay (–) Grass (–)	Finals by setting Outdoor (1–1) Indoor (–)

Result	W–L	Date	Tournament	Tier	Surface	Partner	Opponents	Score
Win	1–0	Mar 2021	Qatar Open, Qatar	ATP 250	Hard	(Russia) Andrey Rublev	(New Zealand) Marcus Daniell (Austria) Philipp Oswald	7–5, 6–4
Loss	1–1	Oct 2021	Indian Wells Masters, US	ATP 1000	Hard	(Russia) Andrey Rublev	(Australia) John Peers (Slovakia) Filip Polášek	3–6, 6–7^{(5–7)}

== ATP Challenger Tour finals ==
=== Singles: 9 (4 titles, 5 runner-ups) ===
Legend ATP Challenger Tour (4–5)	Finals by surface Hard (2–2) Clay (2–3)

Result	W–L	Date	Tournament	Tier	Surface	Opponent	Score
Loss	0–1	May 2014	Samarkand Challenger, Uzbekistan	Challenger	Clay	(Uzbekistan) Farrukh Dustov	6–7^{(4–7)}, 1–6
Win	1–1	Mar 2015	Kazan Kremlin Cup, Russia	Challenger	Hard (i)	(Russia) Konstantin Kravchuk	6–4, 4–6, 6–3
Loss	1–2	Mar 2016	Kazan Kremlin Cup, Russia	Challenger	Hard (i)	(Germany) Tobias Kamke	4–6, 2–6
Loss	1–3	Jul 2016	Tampere Open, Finland	Challenger	Clay	(Belgium) Kimmer Coppejans	4–6, 6–3, 5–7
Loss	1–4	Jan 2020	Bangkok Challenger, Thailand	Challenger	Hard	(Hungary) Attila Balázs	6–7^{(5–7)}, 6–0, 6–7^{(6–8)}
Loss	1–5	Aug 2020	Prague Open, Czech Republic	Challenger	Clay	(Switzerland) Stan Wawrinka	6–7^{(2–7)}, 4–6
Win	2–5	Aug 2020	RPM Open, Czech Republic	Challenger	Clay	(Netherlands) Tallon Griekspoor	6–4, 7–6^{(8–6)}
Win	3–5	Sep 2020	Prosperita Ostrava Open, Czech Republic	Challenger	Clay	(Germany) Oscar Otte	6–4, 6–2
Win	4–5	Dec 2024	Nonthaburi Challenger, Thailand	Challenger	Hard	(France) Grégoire Barrère	7–6^{(7–5)}, 7–5

=== Doubles: 3 (1 title, 2 runner-ups) ===
Legend ATP Challenger Tour (1–2)	Finals by surface Hard (1–0) Clay (0–2)

Result	W–L	Date	Tournament	Tier	Surface	Partner	Opponents	Score
Loss	0–1	Sep 2014	Brașov Challenger, Romania	Challenger	Clay	(Russia) Valery Rudnev	(Italy) Daniele Giorgini (Romania) Adrian Ungur	6–4, 6–7^{(4–7)}, [1–10]
Win	1–1	Apr 2015	Batman Cup, Turkey	Challenger	Hard	(Belarus) Yaraslav Shyla	(Croatia) Mate Pavić (Australia) Michael Venus	7–6^{(7–4)}, 4–6, [10–5]
Loss	1–2	Jul 2015	Sport 1 Open, Netherlands	Challenger	Clay	(Russia) Andrey Kuznetsov	(Uruguay) Ariel Behar (Brazil) Eduardo Dischinger	0–0 ret.

== ITF Tour finals ==
=== Singles: 13 (10 titles, 3 runner-ups) ===
Legend ITF Futures/WTT (10–3)	Finals by surface Hard (7–2) Clay (3–1)

Result	W–L	Date	Tournament	Tier	Surface	Opponent	Score
Win	1–0	May 2013	Russia F7, Kazan	Futures	Clay	(Ukraine) Artem Smirnov	6–4, 6–4
Win	2–0	Jun 2013	Russia F8, Moscow	Futures	Clay	(Russia) Victor Baluda	4–6, 6–2, 6–2
Win	3–0	Jun 2013	Egypt F12, Sharm El Sheikh	Futures	Clay	(Egypt) Karim Hossam	6–4, 7–5
Loss	3–1	Jul 2014	France F15, Saint-Gervais-les-Bains	Futures	Clay	(France) Martin Vaïsse	3–6, 3–6
Win	4–1	Dec 2017	Qatar F5, Doha	Futures	Hard	(Germany) Benjamin Hassan	6–4, 6–0
Win	5–1	Jan 2018	Egypt F1, Sharm El Sheikh	Futures	Hard	(Belgium) Yannick Mertens	6–1, 6–2
Win	6–1	Jan 2018	Egypt F2, Sharm El Sheikh	Futures	Hard	(Ukraine) Artem Smirnov	6–3, 6–2
Win	7–1	Jul 2018	France F13, Ajaccio	Futures	Hard	(France) Rémi Boutillier	7–6^{(8–6)}, 4–6, 6–3
Win	8–1	Nov 2018	Tunisia F41, Monastir	Futures	Hard	(Russia) Ivan Gakhov	6–4, 6–3
Win	9–1	Dec 2018	Tunisia F42, Monastir	Futures	Hard	(France) Alexandre Müller	6–4, 4–6, 6–1
Loss	9–2	Dec 2018	Qatar F4, Doha	Futures	Hard	(Portugal) Gonçalo Oliveira	3–6, 5–7
Loss	9–3	Dec 2018	Qatar F6, Doha	Futures	Hard	(Italy) Lorenzo Frigerio	6–2, 4–6, 7–5
Win	10–3	Dec 2019	M15 Doha, Qatar	WTT	Hard	(Georgia (country)) Aleksandre Bakshi	3–6, 6–2, 6–2

=== Doubles: 5 (3 titles, 2 runner-ups) ===
Legend ITF Futures/WTT (3–2)	Finals by surface Hard (0–1) Clay (3–1)

Result	W–L	Date	Tournament	Tier	Surface	Partner	Opponents	Score
Loss	0–1	Aug 2012	ITF Russia, Vsevolozhsk	Futures	Clay	(Russia) Vitaliy Reshetnikov	(Russia) Vitaliy Kachanovskiy (Russia) Richard Muzaev	2–6, 3–6
Win	1–1	Sep 2013	ITF Russia, Taganrog	Futures	Clay	(Russia) Mikhail Vaks	(Ukraine) Ivan Anikanov (Belarus) Vladimir Kruk	3–6, 7–5, [10–5]
Win	2–1	Jun 2014	ITF Russia, Moscow	Futures	Clay	(Russia) Richard Muzaev	(Russia) Evgeny Elistratov (Russia) Vladimir Polyakov	6–2, 6–3
Loss	2–2	Dec 2017	ITF Qatar, Doha	Futures	Hard	(Croatia) Fran Zgombić	(Turkey) Tuna Altuna (Sweden) Markus Eriksson	1–6, 2–6
Win	3–2	May 2018	ITF Turkey, Antalya	Futures	Clay	(Russia) Alexander Boborykin	(Romania) Răzvan Codescu (Romania) Dan Alexandru Tomescu	6–4, 6–3

== National representation ==
=== Davis Cup: 1 (1 defeat) ===
Group membership World Group (0–0) WG Play-off (0–0) Group I (0–1) Group II (0–0) Group III (0–0) Group IV (0–0)	Matches by surface Hard (0–1) Clay (–) Grass (–) Carpet (–)	Matches by type Singles (0–1) Doubles (–)

- ▲ ▼ indicates the outcome of the Davis Cup match followed by the score, date, place of event, the zonal classification and its phase, and the court surface.

Rubber outcome	No.	Rubber	Match type (partner if any)	Opponent nation	Opponent player(s)	Score
▲4–1; 15–17 July 2016; National Tennis Centre, Moscow, Russia; World Group Second round; Hard surface
Defeat	1	V	Singles (dead rubber)	Netherlands	Matwé Middelkoop	6–4, 1–6, 4–6

=== ATP Cup: 3 (3 defeats) ===
Matches by surface Hard (0–3) Clay (–) Grass (–)	Matches by type Singles (–) Doubles (0–3)

Rubber outcome	No.	Rubber	Match type (partner if any)	Opponent nation	Opponent player(s)	Score
▲4–2; 2–3 February 2021; Melbourne Park, Melbourne, Australia; Group stage; Hard surface
Defeat	1	III	Doubles (with Andrey Rublev)	Argentina	Máximo González / Horacio Zeballos	4–6, 6–7^{(4–7)}
Defeat	2	III	Doubles (with Evgeny Donskoy)	Japan	Ben McLachlan / Yoshihito Nishioka	6–4, 3–6, [10–12]
▲2–1; 6–7 February 2021; Melbourne Park, Melbourne, Australia; Knockout stage; Hard surface
Defeat	3	III	Doubles (with Evgeny Donskoy)	Germany	Kevin Krawietz / Jan-Lennard Struff	3–6, 6–7^{(2–7)}

== Wins over top 10 players ==
- Karatsev has a 6–7 record against players who were, at the time the match was played, ranked in the top 10.

Season	2021	2022	2023	Total
Wins	5	0	1	6

#	Player	Rank	Event	Surface	Rd	Score	AKR
2021
1.	(Argentina) Diego Schwartzman	9	Australian Open	Hard	3R	6–3, 6–3, 6–3	114
2.	(Russia) Andrey Rublev	8	Dubai Championships, UAE	Hard	SF	6–2, 4–6, 6–4	42
3.	(Serbia) Novak Djokovic	1	Serbia Open	Clay	SF	7–5, 4–6, 6–4	28
4.	(Argentina) Diego Schwartzman	9	Madrid Open, Spain	Clay	2R	2–6, 6–4, 6–1	27
5.	(Russia) Daniil Medvedev	2	Italian Open	Clay	2R	6–4, 6–2	27
2023
6.	Daniil Medvedev	3	Madrid Open, Spain	Clay	4R	7–6^{(7–1)}, 6–4	121

* As of 2 May 2023.

== Awards and honours ==
External image
- Aslan Karatsev in 2011, prepares to receive the Russian Cup from Marat Safin

International

- ATP Most Improved Player: 2021.

National

- The Russian Cup in the nominations:
  - Junior of the Year: 2011;
  - Olympians-2020;
  - Team of the Year: 2021.
- Sports title "Merited Master of Sports of Russia" (6 August 2021).
- Medal of the Order "For Merit to the Fatherland", 1st class (11 August 2021).

Regional

- Medal "For the Glory of Ossetia" (10 September 2021).

== Notes ==
Awards
Preceded by (Russia) Andrey Rublev	ATP Most Improved Player; 2021	Succeeded by (Spain) Carlos Alcaraz
