= 2011 Tashkent Challenger – Singles =

Singles
- 2011 Tashkent Challenger

Final
- Champion: (Uzbekistan) Denis Istomin
- Runner-up: (Estonia) Jürgen Zopp
- Score: 6–4, 6–3

Events
Singles	Doubles
← 2010 ·	Tashkent Challenger	· 2012 →

Karol Beck was the defending champion but decided not to participate.

Denis Istomin won the final 6–4, 6–3 against Jürgen Zopp and claimed the title.

== Seeds ==
1. (Chinese Taipei) Lu Yen-hsun (second round)
2. (Israel) Dudi Sela (withdrew)
3. (Uzbekistan) Denis Istomin (champion)
4. (Germany) Cedrik-Marcel Stebe (second round)
5. (Germany) Rainer Schüttler (first round)
6. (Canada) Vasek Pospisil (withdrew)
7. (Russia) Teymuraz Gabashvili (first round)
8. (South Africa) Rik de Voest (second round)

== Draw ==
=== Key ===
- Q = Qualifier
- WC = Wild card
- LL = Lucky loser
- Alt = Alternate
- SE = Special exempt
- PR = Protected ranking
- ITF = ITF entry
- JE = Junior exempt
- w/o = Walkover
- r = Retired
- d = Defaulted
- SR = Special ranking

=== Finals ===
Semifinals
(South Africa) Raven Klaasen	3	4
(Estonia) Jürgen Zopp	6	6
3	(Uzbekistan) Denis Istomin	7^{7}	7
(Russia) Konstantin Kravchuk	6^{4}	5

Final
(Estonia) Jürgen Zopp	4	3
3	(Uzbekistan) Denis Istomin	6	6

=== Top half ===
First round
1	(Chinese Taipei) Y-h Lu	6	7^{10}
Q	(Ukraine) Stanislav Poplavskyy	1	6^{8}
(South Africa) R Klaasen	6	6
Q	(Uzbekistan) Andrey Boldarev	4	4
(Spain) A Brugués Davi	4	3
(Ukraine) D Molchanov	6	6
WC	(India) V Vardhan	7^{7}	6
LL	(Uzbekistan) Sergey Shipilov	6^{5}	2
4	(Germany) C-M Stebe	6	6
(Belgium) D Goffin	4	4
(Finland) H Heliövaara	1	1
(Estonia) J Zopp	6	6
(Chinese Taipei) T-h Yang	6	3	7
(Ukraine) I Marchenko	3	6	5
(Uzbekistan) F Dustov	6^{5}	6	7^{7}
7	(Russia) T Gabashvili	7^{7}	3	6^{5}

Second round
1	(Chinese Taipei) Y-h Lu	4	3
(South Africa) R Klaasen	6	6
(Ukraine) D Molchanov	6^{4}	6	7
WC	(India) V Vardhan	7^{7}	3	5
4	(Germany) C-M Stebe	6^{5}	5
(Estonia) J Zopp	7^{7}	7
(Chinese Taipei) T-h Yang	4	6	7
(Uzbekistan) F Dustov	6	1	5

Quarterfinals
(South Africa) R Klaasen	7^{8}	6
(Ukraine) D Molchanov	6^{6}	3
(Estonia) J Zopp	7^{8}	6
(Chinese Taipei) T-h Yang	6^{6}	2

Semifinals
(South Africa) R Klaasen	3	4
(Estonia) J Zopp	6	6

=== Bottom half ===
First round
5	(Germany) R Schüttler	4	4
(Germany) D Meffert	6	6
LL	(Uzbekistan) Jakhongir Khaydarov	1	2
WC	(Uzbekistan) M Inoyatov	6	6
WC	(Uzbekistan) Temur Ismailov	5	3
(Germany) S Rieschick	7	6
(Belarus) U Ignatik	6	3	6^{0}
3	(Uzbekistan) D Istomin	3	6	7^{7}
8	(South Africa) R de Voest	6	7
Q	(Uzbekistan) S Ikramov	3	5
(Russia) K Kravchuk	7	7^{8}
Q	(Russia) E Kirillov	5	6^{6}
(Russia) D Matsukevich	6	6
WC	(Uzbekistan) Nigmat Shofayziev	2	1
(Czech Republic) J Hernych	6	6
LL	(Uzbekistan) Pavel Tsoy	0	4

Second round
(Germany) D Meffert	1	1^{r}
WC	(Uzbekistan) M Inoyatov	6	2
(Germany) S Rieschick	4	3
3	(Uzbekistan) D Istomin	6	6
8	(South Africa) R de Voest	7	3	3
(Russia) K Kravchuk	5	6	6
(Russia) D Matsukevich	6	1
(Czech Republic) J Hernych	3	0	r

Quarterfinals
WC	(Uzbekistan) M Inoyatov	2	3
3	(Uzbekistan) D Istomin	6	6
(Russia) K Kravchuk	7^{7}	7^{7}
(Russia) D Matsukevich	6^{4}	6^{1}

Semifinals
3	(Uzbekistan) D Istomin	7^{7}	7
(Russia) K Kravchuk	6^{4}	5
