= 2011 Tashkent Challenger – Doubles =

Doubles
- 2011 Tashkent Challenger

Final
- Champions: (Finland) Harri Heliövaara (Ukraine) Denys Molchanov
- Runners-up: (United States) John Paul Fruttero (South Africa) Raven Klaasen
- Score: 7–6^{(7–5)}, 7–6^{(7–3)}

Events
Singles	Doubles
← 2010 ·	Tashkent Challenger	· 2012 →

Ross Hutchins and Jamie Murray were the defending champions, but decided not to participate.

Harri Heliövaara and Denys Molchanov won the title, defeating John Paul Fruttero and Raven Klaasen 7–6^{(7–5)}, 7–6^{(7–3)} in the final.

== Seeds ==
1. (Russia) Michail Elgin / (Russia) Teymuraz Gabashvili (quarterfinals)
2. (South Africa) Rik de Voest / (Philippines) Treat Conrad Huey (first round, withdrew)
3. (United States) John Paul Fruttero / (South Africa) Raven Klaasen (final)
4. (Finland) Harri Heliövaara / (Ukraine) Denys Molchanov (champions)

== Draw ==
=== Key ===
- Q = Qualifier
- WC = Wild card
- LL = Lucky loser
- Alt = Alternate
- SE = Special exempt
- PR = Protected ranking
- ITF = ITF entry
- JE = Junior exempt
- w/o = Walkover
- r = Retired
- d = Defaulted
- SR = Special ranking

=== Draw ===
First round
1	(Russia) M Elgin (Russia) T Gabashvili	7^{7}	4	[10]
(Russia) E Kirillov (Germany) S Rieschick	6^{3}	6	[4]
(Uzbekistan) S Ikramov (Uzbekistan) Temur Ismailov	5	1
(Belarus) U Ignatik (Russia) D Matsukevich	7	6
4	(Finland) H Heliövaara (Ukraine) D Molchanov	6	6
(Uzbekistan) D Istomin (Uzbekistan) Nigmat Shofayziev	3	3
(Germany) D Meffert (Chinese Taipei) T-h Yang	6	6
(Spain) A Brugués-Davi (Spain) Israel Vior-Díaz	1	2
(Czech Republic) J Hernych (Estonia) J Zopp	3	6	[4]
(India) D Sharan (India) V Vardhan	6	0	[10]
WC	(Uzbekistan) Jakhongir Khaydarov (Uzbekistan) V Uzakov	5	4
3	(United States) JP Fruttero (South Africa) R Klaasen	7	6
WC	(Uzbekistan) Sanjar Fayziev (Uzbekistan) Bobur Kamiljanov	2	4
(Uzbekistan) M Inoyatov (Russia) Sergei Krotiouk	6	6
WC	(Uzbekistan) F Dustov (Netherlands) S Groen	w/o
2	(South Africa) R de Voest (Philippines) TC Huey

Quarterfinals
1	(Russia) M Elgin (Russia) T Gabashvili	3	6	[6]
(Belarus) U Ignatik (Russia) D Matsukevich	6	3	[10]
4	(Finland) H Heliövaara (Ukraine) D Molchanov	w/o
(Germany) D Meffert (Chinese Taipei) T-h Yang
(India) D Sharan (India) V Vardhan	5	1
3	(United States) JP Fruttero (South Africa) R Klaasen	7	6
(Uzbekistan) M Inoyatov (Russia) Sergei Krotiouk	6	7^{7}
WC	(Uzbekistan) F Dustov (Netherlands) S Groen	4	6^{5}

Semifinals
(Belarus) U Ignatik (Russia) D Matsukevich	6^{12}	6^{8}
4	(Finland) H Heliövaara (Ukraine) D Molchanov	7^{14}	7^{10}
3	(United States) JP Fruttero (South Africa) R Klaasen	7^{7}	4	[10]
(Uzbekistan) M Inoyatov (Russia) Sergei Krotiouk	6^{5}	6	[3]

Final
4	(Finland) H Heliövaara (Ukraine) D Molchanov	7^{7}	7^{7}
3	(United States) JP Fruttero (South Africa) R Klaasen	6^{5}	6^{3}
