= 2010 Tashkent Challenger – Doubles =

Doubles
- 2010 Tashkent Challenger

Final
- Champions: (United Kingdom) Ross Hutchins (United Kingdom) Jamie Murray
- Runners-up: (Slovakia) Karol Beck (Slovakia) Filip Polášek
- Score: 2–6, 6–4, [10–8]

Events
Singles	Doubles
← 2009 ·	Tashkent Challenger	· 2011 →

Murad Inoyatov and Denis Istomin were the defending champions, but only Inoyatov chose to participate this year.
He partnered with Dmitri Sitak, but they were eliminated by Karol Beck and Filip Polášek in the quarterfinal.
Beck and Polášek went to reach the final but lost there to Ross Hutchins and Jamie Murray 6–2, 4–6, [8–10].

== Seeds ==
1. (Jamaica) Dustin Brown / (Netherlands) Rogier Wassen (semifinals)
2. (United Kingdom) Ross Hutchins / (United Kingdom) Jamie Murray (champions)
3. (Slovakia) Karol Beck / (Slovakia) Filip Polášek (final)
4. (Philippines) Treat Conrad Huey / (United Kingdom) Dominic Inglot (semifinals)

== Draw ==
=== Key ===
- Q = Qualifier
- WC = Wild card
- LL = Lucky loser
- Alt = Alternate
- SE = Special exempt
- PR = Protected ranking
- ITF = ITF entry
- JE = Junior exempt
- w/o = Walkover
- r = Retired
- d = Defaulted
- SR = Special ranking

=== Draw ===
First round
1	(Jamaica) D Brown (Netherlands) R Wassen	4	6	[10]
(Belarus) U Ignatik (Slovakia) A Martin	6	4	[7]
WC	(Slovakia) M Semjan (Uzbekistan) V Uzakov	3	7	[10]
(Canada) V Pospisil (Canada) A Shamasdin	6	5	[6]
3	(Slovakia) K Beck (Slovakia) F Polášek	6	6
(Russia) E Kirillov (Russia) K Kravchuk	3	1
WC	(Uzbekistan) F Dustov (Netherlands) S Groen	7	6^{5}	[3]
WC	(Uzbekistan) M Inoyatov (Russia) D Sitak	5	7	[10]
(Portugal) F Gil (Czech Republic) D Lojda	1	6	[3]
(Australia) S Kadir (India) P Raja	6	3	[10]
(Australia) R Junaid (Germany) F Moser	5	3
4	(Philippines) TC Huey (United Kingdom) D Inglot	7	6
(Austria) N Moser (Austria) A Peya	6	7
(Switzerland) M Lammer (Croatia) F Škugor	4	5
(Russia) M Elgin (Russia) A Kudryavtsev	3	6	[10]
2	(United Kingdom) R Hutchins (United Kingdom) J Murray	6	3	[12]

Quarterfinals
1	(Jamaica) D Brown (Netherlands) R Wassen	6	6
WC	(Slovakia) M Semjan (Uzbekistan) V Uzakov	4	2
3	(Slovakia) K Beck (Slovakia) F Polášek	7	6
WC	(Uzbekistan) M Inoyatov (Russia) D Sitak	5	4
(Australia) S Kadir (India) P Raja	6	1	[8]
4	(Philippines) TC Huey (United Kingdom) D Inglot	3	6	[10]
(Austria) N Moser (Austria) A Peya	4	3
2	(United Kingdom) R Hutchins (United Kingdom) J Murray	6	6

Semifinals
1	(Jamaica) D Brown (Netherlands) R Wassen	4	2
3	(Slovakia) K Beck (Slovakia) F Polášek	6	6
4	(Philippines) TC Huey (United Kingdom) D Inglot	6^{5}	4
2	(United Kingdom) R Hutchins (United Kingdom) J Murray	7	6

Finals
3	(Slovakia) K Beck (Slovakia) F Polášek	6	4	[8]
2	(United Kingdom) R Hutchins (United Kingdom) J Murray	2	6	[10]
