= 2013 Tashkent Challenger – Doubles =

Doubles
- 2013 Tashkent Challenger

Final
- Champions: (Russia) Mikhail Elgin; (Russia) Teymuraz Gabashvili
- Runners-up: (India) Purav Raja; (India) Divij Sharan
- Score: 6–4, 6–4

Events
Singles	Doubles
← 2012 ·	Tashkent Challenger	· 2014 →

Andre Begemann and Martin Emmrich were the defending champions but decided not to participate.
Russian pairing of Mikhail Elgin and Teymuraz Gabashvili won the title over Indians Purav Raja and Divij Sharan 6–4, 6–4.

== Seeds ==
1. (Czech Republic) Lukáš Dlouhý / (Australia) Paul Hanley (quarterfinals)
2. (India) Purav Raja / (India) Divij Sharan (final)
3. (Germany) Frank Moser / (Austria) Philipp Oswald (quarterfinals)
4. (Thailand) Sanchai Ratiwatana / (Thailand) Sonchat Ratiwatana (quarterfinals)

== Draw ==
=== Key ===
- Q = Qualifier
- WC = Wild card
- LL = Lucky loser
- Alt = Alternate
- SE = Special exempt
- PR = Protected ranking
- ITF = ITF entry
- JE = Junior exempt
- w/o = Walkover
- r = Retired
- d = Defaulted
- SR = Special ranking

=== Draw ===
First round

Quarterfinals

Semifinals

Final

1
- (Czech Republic) L Dlouhý
- (Australia) P Hanley
7^{7}
6

WC
- (Uzbekistan) Shonigmatjon Shofayziyev
- (Thailand) D Udomchoke
6^{1}
3

1
- (Czech Republic) L Dlouhý
- (Australia) P Hanley
4
2

- (Russia) M Elgin
- (Russia) T Gabashvili
7^{7}
2
[10]

- (Russia) M Elgin
- (Russia) T Gabashvili
6
6

- (Moldova) R Albot
- (Ukraine) O Nedovyesov
6^{4}
6
[4]

- (Russia) M Elgin
- (Russia) T Gabashvili
6
5
[10]

3
- (Germany) F Moser
- (Austria) P Oswald
7^{7}
6

- (United States) J Cerretani
- (Canada) A Shamasdin
3
7
[4]

- (Chinese Taipei) T Chen
- (Switzerland) M Chiudinelli
6^{2}
4

3
- (Germany) F Moser
- (Austria) P Oswald
4
6
[7]

- (United States) J Cerretani
- (Canada) A Shamasdin
6
6

- (United States) J Cerretani
- (Canada) A Shamasdin
6
4
[10]

- (Russia) V Baluda
- (Russia) K Kravchuk
4
4

- (Russia) M Elgin
- (Russia) T Gabashvili
6
6

WC
- (Uzbekistan) S Fayziev
- (Uzbekistan) T Ismailov
7
2
[5]

2
- (India) P Raja
- (India) D Sharan
4
4

Alt
- (Israel) D Sela
- (Israel) A Weintraub
5
6
[10]

Alt
- (Israel) D Sela
- (Israel) A Weintraub
3
7^{8}
[10]

WC
- (Italy) A Motti
- (France) S Robert
4
2

4
- (Thailand) Sa Ratiwatana
- (Thailand) So Ratiwatana
6
6^{6}
[7]

4
- (Thailand) Sa Ratiwatana
- (Thailand) So Ratiwatana
6
6

Alt
- (Israel) D Sela
- (Israel) A Weintraub
7
3
[11]

- (Belarus) U Ignatik
- (Slovakia) L Lacko
6
6^{8}
[8]

2
- (India) P Raja
- (India) D Sharan
5
6
[13]

- (Uzbekistan) F Dustov
- (Tunisia) M Jaziri
4
7^{10}
[10]

WC
- (Uzbekistan) F Dustov
- (Tunisia) M Jaziri
5
4

- (Italy) A Arnaboldi
- (Italy) T Fabbiano
7
3
[3]

2
- (India) P Raja
- (India) D Sharan
7
6

2
- (India) P Raja
- (India) D Sharan
5
6
[10]
