= 2013 Tashkent Challenger =

- Date: 7–13 October
- Edition: 6th
- Surface: Hard
- Location: Tashkent, Uzbekistan

Champions

Singles
- (Israel) Dudi Sela

Doubles
- (Russia) Mikhail Elgin / (Russia) Teymuraz Gabashvili
| ← 2012 · | Tashkent Challenger | · 2014 → |

The 2013 Tashkent Challenger was a professional tennis tournament played on hard courts. It was the sixth edition of the tournament which was part of the 2013 ATP Challenger Tour. It took place in Tashkent, Uzbekistan between 7 and 13 October 2013.

== Singles main-draw entrants ==
=== Seeds ===
| Country | Player | Rank^{1} | Seed |
|---|---|---|---|
| SVK | Lukáš Lacko | 81 | 1 |
| RUS | Evgeny Donskoy | 88 | 2 |
| ISR | Dudi Sela | 89 | 3 |
| UKR | Sergiy Stakhovsky | 94 | 4 |
| FRA | Stéphane Robert | 115 | 5 |
| RUS | Teymuraz Gabashvili | 118 | 6 |
| UKR | Oleksandr Nedovyesov | 127 | 7 |
| SUI | Marco Chiudinelli | 161 | 8 |

- ^{1} Rankings are as of September 30, 2013.

=== Other entrants ===
The following players received wildcards into the singles main draw:

- (Uzbekistan) Sanjar Fayziev
- (Uzbekistan) Temur Ismailov
- (Uzbekistan) Djurabeck Karimov
- (Uzbekistan) Shonigmatjon Shofayziyev

The following players received entry from the qualifying draw:

- (Uzbekistan) Sarvar Ikramov
- (South Korea) Lim Yong-Kyu
- (France) Lucas Pouille
- (Thailand) Danai Udomchoke

== Champions ==
=== Singles ===
- (Israel) Dudi Sela def. (Russia) Teymuraz Gabashvili 6–1, 6–2

=== Doubles ===
- (Russia) Mikhail Elgin / (Russia) Teymuraz Gabashvili def. (India) Purav Raja / (India) Divij Sharan 6–4, 6–4
