= 2017 Tashkent Challenger – Singles =

Singles
- 2017 Tashkent Challenger

Final
- Champion: (Spain) Guillermo García López
- Runner-up: (Poland) Kamil Majchrzak
- Score: 6–1, 7–6^{(7–1)}

Events
Singles	Doubles
← 2016 ·	Tashkent Challenger	· 2018 →

Konstantin Kravchuk was the defending champion but lost in the second round to Marek Jaloviec.

Guillermo García López won the title after defeating Kamil Majchrzak 6–1, 7–6^{(7–1)} in the final.

== Seeds ==
1. (Uzbekistan) Denis Istomin (semifinals)
2. (Italy) Thomas Fabbiano (second round)
3. (Kazakhstan) Alexander Bublik (second round)
4. (Spain) Guillermo García López (champion)
5. (Slovakia) Lukáš Lacko (withdrew)
6. (Italy) Matteo Berrettini (second round)
7. (India) Yuki Bhambri (second round)
8. (Russia) Konstantin Kravchuk (second round)

== Draw ==
=== Key ===
- Q = Qualifier
- WC = Wild card
- LL = Lucky loser
- Alt = Alternate
- SE = Special exempt
- PR = Protected ranking
- ITF = ITF entry
- JE = Junior exempt
- w/o = Walkover
- r = Retired
- d = Defaulted
- SR = Special ranking

=== Finals ===
Semifinals
1	(Uzbekistan) Denis Istomin	6^{5}	4
4	(Spain) Guillermo García López	7^{7}	6
(Czech Republic) Marek Jaloviec	4	6	3
(Poland) Kamil Majchrzak	6	4	6

Final
4	(Spain) Guillermo García López	6	7^{7}
(Poland) Kamil Majchrzak	1	6^{1}

=== Top half ===
First round
1	(Uzbekistan) D Istomin	6^{3}	6	7
WC	(Uzbekistan) F Dustov	7^{7}	1	5
(Uzbekistan) S Fayziev	6^{3}	4
(Bosnia and Herzegovina) A Šetkić	7^{7}	6
(Belarus) U Ignatik	5
(Czech Republic) A Pavlásek	1^{r}
Q	(Switzerland) L Margaroli	3	7^{7}	3
Q	(Serbia) D Petrović	6	6^{5}	6
4	(Spain) G García López	6	6
Q	(Kazakhstan) D Yevseyev	2	3
Q	(Ukraine) D Molchanov	6	5	6
WC	(Uzbekistan) K Sultanov	4	7	4
(Czech Republic) V Šafránek	w/o
(South Africa) L Harris
(Spain) E López Pérez	6^{2}	6	2
6	(Italy) M Berrettini	7^{7}	2	6

Second round
1	(Uzbekistan) D Istomin	6	6
(Bosnia and Herzegovina) A Šetkić	4	1
(Belarus) U Ignatik	6	6
Q	(Serbia) D Petrović	4	2
4	(Spain) G García López	7	6
Q	(Ukraine) D Molchanov	5	1
(Czech Republic) V Šafránek	6	7^{7}
6	(Italy) M Berrettini	4	6^{3}

Quarterfinals
1	(Uzbekistan) D Istomin	6	6
(Belarus) U Ignatik	3	3
4	(Spain) G García López	6	6
(Czech Republic) V Šafránek	3	3

Semifinals
1	(Uzbekistan) D Istomin	6^{5}	4
4	(Spain) G García López	7^{7}	6

=== Bottom half ===
First round
8	(Russia) K Kravchuk	7^{7}	6
LL	(Russia) I Nedelko	6^{5}	3
(Czech Republic) Marek Jaloviec	7^{7}	6
LL	(Russia) I Gakhov	6^{5}	2
(Bosnia and Herzegovina) M Bašić	3	6^{6}
(France) G Sakharov	6	7^{8}
WC	(Uzbekistan) J Karimov	6^{5}	7	5
3	(Kazakhstan) A Bublik	7^{7}	5	7
7	(India) Y Bhambri	3
(Kazakhstan) A Nedovyesov	0^{r}
(Australia) M Polmans	4	6^{8}
(Poland) K Majchrzak	6	7^{10}
(Russia) T Gabashvili	4	0
(Egypt) M Safwat	6	6
WC	(Uzbekistan) T Ismailov	3	1
2	(Italy) T Fabbiano	6	6

Second round
8	(Russia) K Kravchuk	2	4
(Czech Republic) M Jaloviec	6	6
(France) G Sakharov	7^{10}	0	6
3	(Kazakhstan) A Bublik	6^{8}	6	2
7	(India) Y Bhambri	4	6	4
(Poland) K Majchrzak	6	1	6
(Egypt) M Safwat	6	3	6
2	(Italy) T Fabbiano	3	6	2

Quarterfinals
(Czech Republic) M Jaloviec	6	5	7
(France) G Sakharov	4	7	5
(Poland) K Majchrzak	6	6
(Egypt) M Safwat	3	0

Semifinals
(Czech Republic) M Jaloviec	4	6	3
(Poland) K Majchrzak	6	4	6
