= 2017 Tashkent Challenger – Doubles =

Doubles
- 2017 Tashkent Challenger

Final
- Champions: (Chile) Hans Podlipnik-Castillo (Belarus) Andrei Vasilevski
- Runners-up: (India) Yuki Bhambri (India) Divij Sharan
- Score: 6–4, 6–2

Events
| Singles | Doubles |
| ← 2016 · | Tashkent Challenger | · 2018 → |

Mikhail Elgin and Denis Istomin were the defending champions but lost in the first round to James Cerretani and Marc Polmans.

Hans Podlipnik-Castillo and Andrei Vasilevski won the title after defeating Yuki Bhambri and Divij Sharan 6–4, 6–2 in the final.

== Seeds ==
1. (Argentina) Guillermo Durán / (Argentina) Andrés Molteni (first round)
2. (Chile) Hans Podlipnik-Castillo / (Belarus) Andrei Vasilevski (champions)
3. (United States) James Cerretani / (Australia) Marc Polmans (semifinals)
4. (India) Jeevan Nedunchezhiyan / (India) Vishnu Vardhan (first round)

== Draw ==
=== Key ===
- Q = Qualifier
- WC = Wild card
- LL = Lucky loser
- Alt = Alternate
- SE = Special exempt
- PR = Protected ranking
- ITF = ITF entry
- JE = Junior exempt
- w/o = Walkover
- r = Retired
- d = Defaulted
- SR = Special ranking

First round
1 | (Argentina) G Durán (Argentina) A Molteni | 4 | 2
(India) Y Bhambri (India) D Sharan | 6 | 6
WC | (Uzbekistan) S Fayziev (Uzbekistan) J Karimov | 4 | 6^{7}
(Monaco) R Arneodo (Ukraine) D Molchanov | 6 | 7^{9}
4 | (India) J Nedunchezhiyan (India) V Vardhan | 6^{6} | 6^{6}
(Italy) T Fabbiano (Switzerland) L Margaroli | 7^{8} | 7^{8}
(Spain) G García López (Spain) E López-Pérez | 6^{5} | 6 | [10]
(Belarus) A Bury (Sweden) A Siljeström | 7^{7} | 3 | [6]
(Kazakhstan) A Bublik (Russia) A Pavlioutchenkov | 6 | 5 | [6]
(Belarus) U Ignatik (Bosnia and Herzegovina) A Šetkić | 4 | 7 | [10]
(Russia) M Elgin (Uzbekistan) D Istomin | 4 | 6^{6}
3 | (United States) J Cerretani (Australia) M Polmans | 6 | 7^{8}
(Bosnia and Herzegovina) M Bašić (Japan) T Matsui | 6 | 6
WC | (Uzbekistan) T Ismailov (Uzbekistan) Shonigmatjon Shofayziyev | 2 | 4
WC | (Kazakhstan) T Khabibulin (Kazakhstan) A Nedovyesov | 6^{10} | 7^{9} | [3]
2 | (Chile) H Podlipnik-Castillo (Belarus) A Vasilevski | 7^{12} | 6^{7} | [10]

Quarterfinals
(India) Y Bhambri (India) D Sharan | 6 | 7^{7}
(Monaco) R Arneodo (Ukraine) D Molchanov | 3 | 6^{3}
(Italy) T Fabbiano (Switzerland) L Margaroli | 5 | 7^{7} | [3]
(Spain) G García López (Spain) E López-Pérez | 7 | 6^{4} | [10]
(Belarus) U Ignatik (Bosnia and Herzegovina) A Šetkić | 4 | 6^{1}
3 | (United States) J Cerretani (Australia) M Polmans | 6 | 7^{7}
(Bosnia and Herzegovina) M Bašić (Japan) T Matsui | 3 | 6 | [4]
2 | (Chile) H Podlipnik-Castillo (Belarus) A Vasilevski | 6 | 3 | [10]

Semifinals
(India) Y Bhambri (India) D Sharan | 3 | 7 | [10]
(Spain) G García López (Spain) E López-Pérez | 6 | 5 | [6]
3 | (United States) J Cerretani (Australia) M Polmans | 6^{1} | 6^{4}
2 | (Chile) H Podlipnik-Castillo (Belarus) A Vasilevski | 7^{7} | 7^{7}

Final
(India) Y Bhambri (India) D Sharan | 4 | 2
2 | (Chile) H Podlipnik-Castillo (Belarus) A Vasilevski | 6 | 6
