= 2015 Tashkent Challenger – Doubles =

Doubles
- 2015 Tashkent Challenger

Final
- Champions: (Belarus) Sergey Betov (Russia) Mikhail Elgin
- Runners-up: (Germany) Andre Begemann (New Zealand) Artem Sitak
- Score: 6–4, 6–4

Events
Singles	Doubles
← 2014 ·	Tashkent Challenger	· 2016 →

Lukáš Lacko and Ante Pavić were the defending champions, but chose not defend their title.

Sergey Betov and Mikhail Elgin won the title defeating Andre Begemann and Artem Sitak in the final 6–4, 6–4.

== Seeds ==
1. (Germany) Andre Begemann / (New Zealand) Artem Sitak (final)
2. (Belarus) Sergey Betov / (Russia) Mikhail Elgin (champions)
3. (Belarus) Aliaksandr Bury / (Uzbekistan) Denis Istomin (semifinals)
4. (Canada) Adil Shamasdin / (India) Divij Sharan (first round)

== Draw ==
=== Key ===
- Q = Qualifier
- WC = Wild card
- LL = Lucky loser
- Alt = Alternate
- SE = Special exempt
- PR = Protected ranking
- ITF = ITF entry
- JE = Junior exempt
- w/o = Walkover
- r = Retired
- d = Defaulted
- SR = Special ranking

First round
1	(Germany) A Begemann (New Zealand) A Sitak	7	6
WC	(Uzbekistan) T Ismailov (Uzbekistan) Shonigmatjon Shofayziyev	5	1
WC	(Uzbekistan) F Dustov (United States) JP Fruttero	3	4
(Bosnia and Herzegovina) A Šetkić (Estonia) J Zopp	6	6
3	(Belarus) A Bury (Uzbekistan) D Istomin	6	4	[10]
(Russia) K Kravchuk (Ukraine) D Molchanov	4	6	[6]
(Russia) E Donskoy (Russia) A Kudryavtsev	3	2
(Chinese Taipei) T Chen (Belarus) U Ignatik	6	6
(Israel) D Sela (Israel) A Weintraub	6^{3}	6	[10]
(India) Y Bhambri (New Zealand) M Venus	7^{7}	4	[6]
(Moldova) R Albot (Lithuania) R Berankis	6	6
4	(Canada) A Shamasdin (India) D Sharan	2	4
(Croatia) N Mektić (Croatia) F Škugor	3	4
WC	(Uzbekistan) S Fayziev (Uzbekistan) D Karimov	6	6
(Czech Republic) J Šátral (Russia) A Zaitcev	4	4
2	(Belarus) S Betov (Russia) M Elgin	6	6

Quarterfinals
1	(Germany) A Begemann (New Zealand) A Sitak	6	6
(Bosnia and Herzegovina) A Šetkić (Estonia) J Zopp	1	2
3	(Belarus) A Bury (Uzbekistan) D Istomin	6	6
(Chinese Taipei) T Chen (Belarus) U Ignatik	1	2
(Israel) D Sela (Israel) A Weintraub	6	5	[4]
(Moldova) R Albot (Lithuania) R Berankis	2	7	[10]
WC	(Uzbekistan) S Fayziev (Uzbekistan) D Karimov	4	4
2	(Belarus) S Betov (Russia) M Elgin	6	6

Semifinals
1	(Germany) A Begemann (New Zealand) A Sitak	6	6
3	(Belarus) A Bury (Uzbekistan) D Istomin	4	2
(Moldova) R Albot (Lithuania) R Berankis	1	6	[6]
2	(Belarus) S Betov (Russia) M Elgin	6	3	[10]

Final
1	(Germany) A Begemann (New Zealand) A Sitak	4	4
2	(Belarus) S Betov (Russia) M Elgin	6	6
