= 2009 Tashkent Challenger – Singles =

Singles
- 2009 Tashkent Challenger

Final
- Champion: (Cyprus) Marcos Baghdatis
- Runner-up: (Uzbekistan) Denis Istomin
- Score: 6–3, 1–6, 6–3

Events
Singles	Doubles
- Tashkent Challenger

Lu Yen-hsun tried to defend his 2008 title, but he was eliminated by Oleksandr Dolgopolov Jr. in the second round.
Marcos Baghdatis defeated Denis Istomin 6–3, 1–6, 6–3 in the final.

== Seeds ==
1. (Chinese Taipei) Lu Yen-hsun (second round)
2. (Uzbekistan) Denis Istomin (final)
3. (Cyprus) Marcos Baghdatis (champion)
4. (Belgium) Christophe Rochus (quarterfinals)
5. (Russia) Teymuraz Gabashvili (first round)
6. (United States) Rajeev Ram (first round, retired due to a lower back)
7. (India) Somdev Devvarman (second round)
8. (Ukraine) Sergiy Stakhovsky (quarterfinals)

== Draw ==
Key

- Q = Qualifier
- WC = Wild card
- LL = Lucky loser
- Alt = Alternate
- ITF = ITF entry
- PR = Protected ranking
- SR = Special ranking
- SE = Special exempt
- JE = Junior exempt
- JR = Junior Accelerator Programme entrant
- CO = College Accelerator Programme entrant
- NG = Next Gen Accelerator Program entrant
- w/o = Walkover
- r = Retired
- d = Defaulted

=== Final four ===
Semifinals
(Ukraine) Oleksandr Dolgopolov Jr.	6^{4}	4
3	(Cyprus) Marcos Baghdatis	7	6
(Slovakia) Lukáš Lacko	5	3
2	(Uzbekistan) Denis Istomin	7	6

Final
3	(Cyprus) Marcos Baghdatis	6	1	6
2	(Uzbekistan) Denis Istomin	3	6	3

=== Top half ===
First round
1	(Chinese Taipei) Y-h Lu	6	6
WC	(India) R Bopanna	4	2
(Spain) I Cervantes-Huegun	4	6	3
(Ukraine) O Dolgopolov Jr.	6	3	6
(Latvia) D Pavlovs	3	3
(Russia) A Kudryavtsev	6	6
(Spain) G Olaso	3	2
7	(India) S Devvarman	6	6
3	(Cyprus) M Baghdatis	6	6
(Ukraine) S Bubka	1	3
WC	(Uzbekistan) Vaja Uzakov	1	5
(Russia) E Kirillov	6	7
(Russia) A Kumantsov	7	7
Q	(Czech Republic) J Krkoška	6^{0}	5
(Japan) T Ito	6
6	(United States) R Ram	5	r

Second round
1	(Chinese Taipei) Y-h Lu	7	3	3
(Ukraine) O Dolgopolov Jr.	6^{3}	6	6
(Russia) A Kudryavtsev	6	6
7	(India) S Devvarman	3	4
3	(Cyprus) M Baghdatis	6	6
(Russia) E Kirillov	3	3
(Russia) A Kumantsov	7	7
(Japan) T Ito	6^{1}	6^{6}

Quarterfinals
(Ukraine) O Dolgopolov Jr.	6	6
(Russia) A Kudryavtsev	1	4
3	(Cyprus) M Baghdatis	6	6
(Russia) A Kumantsov	4	2

Semifinals
(Ukraine) O Dolgopolov Jr.	6^{3}	4
3	(Cyprus) M Baghdatis	7	6

=== Bottom half ===
First round
5	(Russia) T Gabashvili	5	4
(Slovakia) L Lacko	7	6
LL	(Uzbekistan) Arsen Asanov	6	1	6
WC	(Uzbekistan) Rifat Biktyakov	4	6	3
(Russia) M Elgin	1	4
Q	(Moldova) A Gorban	6	6
(Ukraine) I Sergeyev	2	1
4	(Belgium) C Rochus	6	6
8	(Ukraine) S Stakhovsky	2	6	7
(Netherlands) M Middelkoop	6	2	5
Q	(Uzbekistan) S Ikramov	6^{3}	3
Q	(Russia) K Kravchuk	7	6
(Kazakhstan) Y Schukin	6	6
WC	(Uzbekistan) M Inoyatov	4	2
(Slovakia) M Kližan	0	r
2	(Uzbekistan) D Istomin	2

Second round
(Slovakia) L Lacko	6	6
LL	(Uzbekistan) A Asanov	0	1
Q	(Moldova) A Gorban	6^{3}	3
4	(Belgium) C Rochus	7	6
8	(Ukraine) S Stakhovsky	6	6
Q	(Russia) K Kravchuk	1	4
(Kazakhstan) Y Schukin	6	1	3
2	(Uzbekistan) D Istomin	3	6	6

Quarterfinals
(Slovakia) L Lacko	6	6
4	(Belgium) C Rochus	2	4
8	(Ukraine) S Stakhovsky	4	5
2	(Uzbekistan) D Istomin	6	7

Semifinals
(Slovakia) L Lacko	5	3
2	(Uzbekistan) D Istomin	7	6
