= 2015 Tashkent Challenger – Singles =

Singles
- 2015 Tashkent Challenger

Final
- Champion: (Uzbekistan) Denis Istomin
- Runner-up: (Slovakia) Lukáš Lacko
- Score: 6–3, 6–4

Events
Singles	Doubles
← 2014 ·	Tashkent Challenger	· 2016 →

Lukáš Lacko was the defending champion, but lost in the final to Denis Istomin.

== Seeds ==
1. (Uzbekistan) Denis Istomin (champion)
2. (Lithuania) Ričardas Berankis (semifinals)
3. (Slovakia) Lukáš Lacko (final)
4. (India) Yuki Bhambri (semifinals)
5. (Moldova) Radu Albot (first round)
6. (Israel) Dudi Sela (quarterfinals)
7. (Russia) Evgeny Donskoy (quarterfinals)
8. (Uzbekistan) Farrukh Dustov (quarterfinals)

== Draw ==
=== Key ===
- Q = Qualifier
- WC = Wild card
- LL = Lucky loser
- Alt = Alternate
- SE = Special exempt
- PR = Protected ranking
- ITF = ITF entry
- JE = Junior exempt
- w/o = Walkover
- r = Retired
- d = Defaulted
- SR = Special ranking

=== Finals ===
Semifinals
1	(Uzbekistan) Denis Istomin	4	6	6
4	(India) Yuki Bhambri	6	3	3
3	(Slovakia) Lukáš Lacko	7^{7}	4	7^{10}
2	(Lithuania) Ričardas Berankis	6^{3}	6	6^{8}

Final
1	(Uzbekistan) Denis Istomin	6	6
3	(Slovakia) Lukáš Lacko	3	4

=== Top half ===
First round
1	(Uzbekistan) D Istomin	7^{7}	6
(Belarus) U Ignatik	6^{5}	4
(Germany) M Marterer	6	6
(Chinese Taipei) T Chen	4	4
WC	(Uzbekistan) J Karimov	3	4
PR	(Israel) A Weintraub	6	6
(Russia) A Vatutin	3	3
7	(Russia) E Donskoy	6	6
4	(India) Y Bhambri	6	6
(Estonia) J Zopp	4	2
(Croatia) N Mektić	6	6
(Russia) M Elgin	2	3
Q	(Estonia) V Ivanov	4	5
WC	(Uzbekistan) S Fayziev	6	7
(Czech Republic) J Šátral	4	6	6
5	(Moldova) R Albot	6	4	1

Second round
1	(Uzbekistan) D Istomin	3	6	7^{7}
(Germany) M Marterer	6	4	6^{4}
PR	(Israel) A Weintraub	6^{4}	1
7	(Russia) E Donskoy	7^{7}	6
4	(India) Y Bhambri	6	1	6
(Croatia) N Mektić	3	6	1
WC	(Uzbekistan) S Fayziev	1	3
(Czech Republic) J Šátral	6	6

Quarterfinals
1	(Uzbekistan) D Istomin	5	6	6
7	(Russia) E Donskoy	7	3	2
4	(India) Y Bhambri	6	6
(Czech Republic) J Šátral	3	4

Semifinals
1	(Uzbekistan) D Istomin	4	6	6
4	(India) Y Bhambri	6	3	3

=== Bottom half ===
First round
8	(Uzbekistan) F Dustov	6	7
(Bosnia and Herzegovina) A Šetkić	2	5
(Ukraine) D Molchanov	4	6^{6}
(Russia) K Kravchuk	6	7^{8}
WC	(Uzbekistan) Shonigmatjon Shofayziyev	4	2
Q	(Bulgaria) S Betov	6	6
(Croatia) F Škugor	4	6	1
3	(Slovakia) L Lacko	6	3	6
6	(Israel) D Sela	6	7^{7}
Q	(Belarus) I Ivashka	2	6^{3}
(Russia) A Kudryavtsev	6	6
WC	(Uzbekistan) T Ismailov	4	2
(Russia) A Karatsev	1	3
(Belarus) E Gerasimov	6	6
Q	(Germany) K Krawietz	4	0
2	(Lithuania) R Berankis	6	6

Second round
8	(Uzbekistan) F Dustov	6	7
(Russia) K Kravchuk	3	5
Q	(Bulgaria) S Betov	2	4
3	(Slovakia) L Lacko	6	6
6	(Israel) D Sela	6	5	7^{7}
(Russia) A Kudryavtsev	3	7	6^{3}
(Belarus) E Gerasimov	6^{5}	7	0
2	(Lithuania) R Berankis	7^{7}	5	6

Quarterfinals
8	(Uzbekistan) F Dustov	4	7^{7}	3
3	(Slovakia) L Lacko	6	6^{5}	6
6	(Israel) D Sela	6	4	6^{5}
2	(Lithuania) R Berankis	4	6	7^{7}

Semifinals
3	(Slovakia) L Lacko	7^{7}	4	7^{10}
2	(Lithuania) R Berankis	6^{3}	6	6^{8}
