= 2010 Tashkent Challenger =

- Date: 12–17 October
- Edition: 3rd
- Surface: Hard
- Location: Tashkent, Uzbekistan

Champions

Singles
- (Slovakia) Karol Beck

Doubles
- (United Kingdom) Ross Hutchins / (United Kingdom) Jamie Murray
← 2009 ·	Tashkent Challenger	· 2011 →

The 2010 Tashkent Challenger was a professional tennis tournament played on hard courts. It was the third edition of the tournament which is part of the 2010 ATP Challenger Tour. It took place in Tashkent, Uzbekistan between 12 and 17 October 2010.

== ATP entrants ==
=== Seeds ===
Country	Player	Rank^{1}	Seed
GER	Rainer Schüttler	84	1
IND	Somdev Devvarman	97	2
POR	Frederico Gil	101	3
JAM	Dustin Brown	115	4
SVK	Karol Beck	127	5
RUS	Konstantin Kravchuk	130	6
LUX	Gilles Müller	159	7
AUT	Andreas Haider-Maurer	162	8

- Rankings are as of October 4, 2010.

=== Other entrants ===
The following players received wildcards into the singles main draw:

- (Uzbekistan) Farrukh Dustov
- (Uzbekistan) Murad Inoyatov
- (Uzbekistan) Sergey Shipilov
- (Uzbekistan) Vaja Uzakov

The following players received entry as an alternate into the singles main draw:

- (Israel) Noam Okun

The following players received entry from the qualifying draw:

- (Australia) Rameez Junaid
- (Croatia) Ante Pavić
- (Canada) Vasek Pospisil
- (France) Clément Reix

== Champions ==
=== Singles ===
(Slovakia) Karol Beck def. (Luxembourg) Gilles Müller, 6–7(4), 6–4, 7–5

=== Doubles ===
(United Kingdom) Ross Hutchins / (United Kingdom) Jamie Murray def. (Slovakia) Karol Beck / (Slovakia) Filip Polášek, 2–6, 6–4, [10–8]
