= 2012 Tashkent Challenger =

- Date: 8–14 October
- Edition: 5th
- Surface: Hard
- Location: Tashkent, Uzbekistan

Champions

Singles
- (Belarus) Uladzimir Ignatik

Doubles
- (Germany) Andre Begemann / (Germany) Martin Emmrich
← 2011 ·	Tashkent Challenger	· 2013 →

The 2012 Tashkent Challenger was a professional tennis tournament played on hard courts. It was the fifth edition of the tournament which was part of the 2012 ATP Challenger Tour. It took place in Tashkent, Uzbekistan between 8 and 14 October 2012.

== Singles main-draw entrants ==
=== Seeds ===
Country	Player	Rank^{1}	Seed
SVK	Lukáš Lacko	65	1
ITA	Flavio Cipolla	78	2
ISR	Dudi Sela	98	3
TUN	Malek Jaziri	112	4
CRO	Ivan Dodig	113	5
CAN	Vasek Pospisil	115	6
RUS	Dmitry Tursunov	117	7
SVK	Karol Beck	128	8

- ^{1} Rankings are as of October 1, 2012.

=== Other entrants ===
The following players received wildcards into the singles main draw:

- (Uzbekistan) Farrukh Dustov
- (Uzbekistan) Sarvar Ikramov
- (Uzbekistan) Sergey Shipilov
- (Uzbekistan) Nigmat Shofayziev

The following players received entry from the qualifying draw:

- (Ukraine) Denys Molchanov
- (Ukraine) Oleksandr Nedovyesov
- (India) Sanam Singh
- (India) Vishnu Vardhan

== Champions ==
=== Singles ===
- (Belarus) Uladzimir Ignatik def. (Slovakia) Lukáš Lacko, 6–3, 7–6^{(7–3)}

=== Doubles ===
- (Germany) Andre Begemann / (Germany) Martin Emmrich def. (Australia) Rameez Junaid / (Germany) Frank Moser, 6–7^{(2–7)}, 7–6^{(7–2)}, [10–8]
