= 2016 Tashkent Challenger – Doubles =

Doubles
- 2016 Tashkent Challenger

Final
- Champions: (Russia) Mikhail Elgin (Uzbekistan) Denis Istomin
- Runners-up: (Germany) Andre Begemann (India) Leander Paes
- Score: 6–4, 6–2

Events
Singles	Doubles
← 2015 ·	Tashkent Challenger	· 2017 →

Sergey Betov and Mikhail Elgin were the defending champions but chose to participate with different partners. Betov partnered Alexander Kudryavtsev but lost in the first round to Mirza Bašić and Blaž Kavčič. Elgin partnered Denis Istomin and won the title.

Elgin and Istomin won the title after defeating Andre Begemann and Leander Paes 6–4, 6–2 in the final.

== Seeds ==
1. (United States) Nicholas Monroe / (New Zealand) Artem Sitak (first round)
2. (India) Purav Raja / (India) Divij Sharan (first round)
3. (Germany) Andre Begemann / (India) Leander Paes (final)
4. (Belarus) Aliaksandr Bury / (Sweden) Andreas Siljeström (semifinals)

== Draw ==
=== Key ===
- Q = Qualifier
- WC = Wild card
- LL = Lucky loser
- Alt = Alternate
- SE = Special exempt
- PR = Protected ranking
- ITF = ITF entry
- JE = Junior exempt
- w/o = Walkover
- r = Retired
- d = Defaulted
- SR = Special ranking

First round
1	(United States) N Monroe (New Zealand) A Sitak	2	4
WC	(Uzbekistan) S Fayziev (Uzbekistan) J Karimov	6	6
(Bosnia and Herzegovina) M Bašić (Slovenia) B Kavčič	6	7^{7}
(Belarus) S Betov (Russia) A Kudryavtsev	1	6^{3}
3	(Germany) A Begemann (India) L Paes	6	6
(Brazil) M Demoliner (Germany) G Kretschmer	4	2
(Ukraine) D Molchanov (Kazakhstan) A Nedovyesov	3	6	[10]
(Belarus) Y Shyla (Belarus) A Vasilevski	6	3	[5]
WC	(Uzbekistan) Saida'Lo Saidkarimov (Uzbekistan) Pavel Tsoy	2	2
(Lithuania) R Berankis (Russia) D Matsukevich	6	6
(Czech Republic) Michal Konečný (Czech Republic) J Veselý	1	5
4	(Belarus) A Bury (Sweden) A Siljeström	6	7
(Russia) M Elgin (Uzbekistan) D Istomin	6	6
WC	(Uzbekistan) Shonigmatjon Shofayziyev (Uzbekistan) K Sultanov	2	4
(Belarus) E Gerasimov (Belarus) I Ivashka	7^{7}	7^{7}
2	(India) P Raja (India) D Sharan	6^{3}	6^{5}

Quarterfinals
WC	(Uzbekistan) S Fayziev (Uzbekistan) J Karimov	w/o
(Bosnia and Herzegovina) M Bašić (Slovenia) B Kavčič
3	(Germany) A Begemann (India) L Paes	4	6	[10]
(Ukraine) D Molchanov (Kazakhstan) A Nedovyesov	6	4	[8]
(Lithuania) R Berankis (Russia) D Matsukevich	3	3
4	(Belarus) A Bury (Sweden) A Siljeström	6	6
(Russia) M Elgin (Uzbekistan) D Istomin	6	6
(Belarus) E Gerasimov (Belarus) I Ivashka	1	1

Semifinals
WC	(Uzbekistan) S Fayziev (Uzbekistan) J Karimov	2	0
3	(Germany) A Begemann (India) L Paes	6	6
4	(Belarus) A Bury (Sweden) A Siljeström	6	4	[8]
(Russia) M Elgin (Uzbekistan) D Istomin	3	6	[10]

Final
3	(Germany) A Begemann (India) L Paes	4	2
(Russia) M Elgin (Uzbekistan) D Istomin	6	6
