= 2016 Tashkent Challenger – Singles =

Singles
- 2016 Tashkent Challenger

Final
- Champion: (Russia) Konstantin Kravchuk
- Runner-up: (Uzbekistan) Denis Istomin
- Score: 7–5, 6–4

Events
Singles	Doubles
← 2015 ·	Tashkent Challenger	· 2017 →

Denis Istomin was the defending champion but lost in the final to Konstantin Kravchuk.

Kravchuk won the title defeating Istomin 7–5, 6–4 in the final.

== Seeds ==
1. (Czech Republic) Jiří Veselý (second round, retired)
2. (France) Jérémy Chardy (quarterfinals)
3. (Lithuania) Ričardas Berankis (second round, retired)
4. (Russia) Evgeny Donskoy (first round)
5. (Russia) Konstantin Kravchuk (champion)
6. (Slovakia) Lukáš Lacko (semifinals)
7. (Uzbekistan) Denis Istomin (final)
8. (Bosnia and Herzegovina) Mirza Bašić (semifinals)

== Draw ==
=== Key ===
- Q = Qualifier
- WC = Wild card
- LL = Lucky loser
- Alt = Alternate
- SE = Special exempt
- PR = Protected ranking
- ITF = ITF entry
- JE = Junior exempt
- w/o = Walkover
- r = Retired
- d = Defaulted
- SR = Special ranking

=== Finals ===
Semifinals
8	(Bosnia and Herzegovina) Mirza Bašić	5	3
5	(Russia) Konstantin Kravchuk	7	6
7	(Uzbekistan) Denis Istomin	6	6
6	(Slovakia) Lukáš Lacko	4	4

Final
5	(Russia) Konstantin Kravchuk	7	6
7	(Uzbekistan) Denis Istomin	5	4

=== Top half ===
First round
1	(Czech Republic) J Veselý	3	6	6
(India) V Vardhan	6	3	4
Q	(Russia) A Zaitcev	6	3	4
(Russia) A Bublik	2	6	6
(Slovenia) B Kavčič	6	3
(Russia) I Nedelko	1	0^{r}
WC	(Uzbekistan) J Karimov	4	3
8	(Bosnia and Herzegovina) M Bašić	6	6
4	(Russia) E Donskoy	6	3	6^{5}
WC	(Uzbekistan) S Fayziev	4	6	7^{7}
(Kazakhstan) A Nedovyesov	6	6
(Russia) A Kudryavtsev	2	3
(Belgium) Y Mertens	6	6
WC	(Uzbekistan) Shonigmatjon Shofayziyev	4	2
Q	(Russia) M Elgin	4	4
5	(Russia) K Kravchuk	6	6

Second round
1	(Czech Republic) J Veselý	7^{7}	0^{r}
(Russia) A Bublik	6^{5}	3
(Slovenia) B Kavčič	5	0^{r}
8	(Bosnia and Herzegovina) M Bašić	7	0
WC	(Uzbekistan) S Fayziev	0	7^{7}	6
(Kazakhstan) A Nedovyesov	6	6^{5}	3
(Belgium) Y Mertens	2	4
5	(Russia) K Kravchuk	6	6

Quarterfinals
(Russia) A Bublik	0	1
8	(Bosnia and Herzegovina) M Bašić	6	6
WC	(Uzbekistan) S Fayziev	4	5
5	(Russia) K Kravchuk	6	7

Semifinals
8	(Bosnia and Herzegovina) M Bašić	5	3
5	(Russia) K Kravchuk	7	6

=== Bottom half ===
First round
7	(Uzbekistan) D Istomin	6	6
(France) G Sakharov	3	3
Q	(Russia) Alexander Vasilenko	6^{1}	6^{5}
(Ukraine) D Molchanov	7^{7}	7^{7}
Q	(Croatia) I Dodig	6	6
(Bosnia and Herzegovina) A Šetkić	4	4
(Czech Republic) Michal Konečný	2	4
3	(Lithuania) R Berankis	6	6
6	(Slovakia) L Lacko	6	6
WC	(Uzbekistan) K Sultanov	4	3
(Belarus) I Ivashka	4	7^{7}	6
(Belarus) E Gerasimov	6	6^{1}	1
(Italy) F Gaio	1	2
(Israel) A Weintraub	6	6
(Russia) E Tyurnev	4	2
2	(France) J Chardy	6	6

Second round
7	(Uzbekistan) D Istomin	4	6	6
(Ukraine) D Molchanov	6	3	2
Q	(Croatia) I Dodig	2
3	(Lithuania) R Berankis	1^{r}
6	(Slovakia) L Lacko	6	6
(Belarus) I Ivashka	1	3
(Israel) A Weintraub
2	(France) J Chardy	w/o

Quarterfinals
7	(Uzbekistan) D Istomin	6	7^{15}
Q	(Croatia) I Dodig	4	6^{13}
6	(Slovakia) L Lacko	4	7^{7}	6
2	(France) J Chardy	6	6^{4}	4

Semifinals
7	(Uzbekistan) D Istomin	6	6
6	(Slovakia) L Lacko	4	4
