= 2017 Tashkent Challenger =

- Date: 9–14 October
- Edition: 10th
- Surface: Hard
- Location: Tashkent, Uzbekistan

Champions

Singles
- (Spain) Guillermo García López

Doubles
- (Chile) Hans Podlipnik Castillo / (Belarus) Andrei Vasilevski
← 2016 ·	Tashkent Challenger	· 2018 →

The 2017 Tashkent Challenger was a professional tennis tournament played on hard courts. It was the tenth edition of the tournament which was part of the 2017 ATP Challenger Tour. It took place in Tashkent, Uzbekistan between 9 and 14 October 2017.

== Singles main-draw entrants ==
=== Seeds ===
Country	Player	Rank^{1}	Seed
UZB	Denis Istomin	53	1
ITA	Thomas Fabbiano	77	2
KAZ	Alexander Bublik	100	3
ESP	Guillermo García López	110	4
~~SVK~~	~~Lukáš Lacko~~	~~113~~	~~5~~
ITA	Matteo Berrettini	123	6
IND	Yuki Bhambri	154	7
RUS	Konstantin Kravchuk	165	8

- ^{1} Rankings are as of 2 October 2017.

=== Other entrants ===
The following players received wildcards into the singles main draw:

- (Uzbekistan) Farrukh Dustov
- (Uzbekistan) Temur Ismailov
- (Uzbekistan) Jurabek Karimov
- (Uzbekistan) Khumoyun Sultanov

The following players received entry from the qualifying draw:

- (Switzerland) Luca Margaroli
- (Ukraine) Denys Molchanov
- (Serbia) Danilo Petrović
- (Kazakhstan) Denis Yevseyev

The following players received entry as lucky losers:

- (Russia) Ivan Gakhov
- (Russia) Ivan Nedelko

== Champions ==
=== Singles ===
- (Spain) Guillermo García López def. (Poland) Kamil Majchrzak 6–1, 7–6^{(7–1)}.

=== Doubles ===
- (Chile) Hans Podlipnik Castillo / (Belarus) Andrei Vasilevski def. (India) Yuki Bhambri / (India) Divij Sharan 6–4, 6–2.
