= 2015 Tashkent Challenger =

- Date: 12–17 October
- Edition: 8th
- Surface: Hard
- Location: Tashkent, Uzbekistan

Champions

Singles
- (Uzbekistan) Denis Istomin

Doubles
- (Belarus) Sergey Betov / (Russia) Mikhail Elgin
← 2014 ·	Tashkent Challenger	· 2016 →

The 2015 Tashkent Challenger was a professional tennis tournament played on hard courts. It was the eighth edition of the tournament which was part of the 2015 ATP Challenger Tour. The tournament took place in Tashkent, Uzbekistan between October 12–17, 2015.

== Singles main-draw entrants ==
=== Seeds ===
Country	Player	Rank^{1}	Seed
UZB	Denis Istomin	70	1
LTU	Ričardas Berankis	74	2
SVK	Lukáš Lacko	101	4
IND	Yuki Bhambri	106	4
MDA	Radu Albot	107	5
ISR	Dudi Sela	114	6
RUS	Evgeny Donskoy	115	7
UZB	Farrukh Dustov	129	8

- ^{1} Rankings are as of October 5, 2015.

=== Other entrants ===
The following players received wildcards into the singles main draw:

- (Uzbekistan) Sanjar Fayziev
- (Uzbekistan) Temur Ismailov
- (Uzbekistan) Jurabek Karimov
- (Uzbekistan) Shonigmatjon Shofayziyev

The following player received entry using a protected ranking:

- (Israel) Amir Weintraub

The following players received entry from the qualifying draw:

- (Estonia) Vladimir Ivanov
- (Belarus) Sergey Betov
- (Belarus) Ilya Ivashka
- (Germany) Kevin Krawietz

== Champions ==
=== Singles ===
- (Uzbekistan) Denis Istomin def. (Slovakia) Lukáš Lacko, 6–3, 6–4.

=== Doubles ===
- (Belarus) Sergey Betov / (Russia) Mikhail Elgin def. (Germany) Andre Begemann / (New Zealand) Artem Sitak, 6–4, 6–4.
