= 2011 Tashkent Challenger =

- Date: 19–25 September
- Edition: 4th
- Surface: Hard
- Location: Tashkent, Uzbekistan

Champions

Singles
- (Uzbekistan) Denis Istomin

Doubles
- (Finland) Harri Heliövaara / (Ukraine) Denys Molchanov
← 2010 ·	Tashkent Challenger	· 2012 →

The 2011 Tashkent Challenger was a professional tennis tournament played on hard courts. It was the fourth edition of the tournament which was part of the 2011 ATP Challenger Tour. It took place in Tashkent, Uzbekistan between 19 and 25 September 2011.

== ATP entrants ==
=== Seeds ===
Country	Player	Rank^{1}	Seed
TPE	Lu Yen-hsun	83	1
ISR	Dudi Sela	96	2
UZB	Denis Istomin	97	3
GER	Cedrik-Marcel Stebe	111	4
GER	Rainer Schüttler	112	5
CAN	Vasek Pospisil	124	6
RUS	Teymuraz Gabashvili	127	7
RSA	Rik de Voest	133	8

- ^{1} Rankings are as of September 12, 2011.

=== Other entrants ===
The following players received wildcards into the singles main draw:

- (Uzbekistan) Murad Inoyatov
- (Uzbekistan) Temur Ismailov
- (Uzbekistan) Nigmat Shofayziev
- (India) Vishnu Vardhan

The following players received entry from the qualifying draw:

- (Uzbekistan) Andrey Boldarev
- (Uzbekistan) Sarvar Ikramov
- (Russia) Evgeny Kirillov
- (Ukraine) Stanislav Poplavskyy

The following players received entry as a lucky loser into the singles main draw:

- (Uzbekistan) Jakhongir Khaydarov
- (Uzbekistan) Sergey Shipilov
- (Uzbekistan) Pavel Tsoy

== Champions ==
=== Singles ===
(Uzbekistan) Denis Istomin def. (Estonia) Jürgen Zopp, 6–4, 6–3

=== Doubles ===
(Finland) Harri Heliövaara / (Ukraine) Denys Molchanov def. (United States) John Paul Fruttero / (South Africa) Raven Klaasen, 7–6^{(7–5)}, 7–6^{(7–3)}
