= 2016 Tashkent Challenger =

- Date: 10–16 October
- Edition: 9th
- Surface: Hard
- Location: Tashkent, Uzbekistan

Champions

Singles
- (Russia) Konstantin Kravchuk

Doubles
- (Russia) Mikhail Elgin / (Uzbekistan) Denis Istomin
← 2015 ·	Tashkent Challenger	· 2017 →

The 2016 Tashkent Challenger was a professional tennis tournament played on hard courts. It was the ninth edition of the tournament, which was part of the 2016 ATP Challenger Tour. It took place in Tashkent, Uzbekistan between 12 and 17 October 2016.

== Singles main-draw entrants ==
=== Seeds ===
Country	Player	Rank^{1}	Seed
CZE	Jiří Veselý	52	1
FRA	Jérémy Chardy	78	2
LTU	Ričardas Berankis	80	4
RUS	Evgeny Donskoy	95	4
RUS	Konstantin Kravchuk	99	5
SVK	Lukáš Lacko	114	6
UZB	Denis Istomin	123	7
BIH	Mirza Bašić	168	8

- ^{1} Rankings are as of October 3, 2016.

=== Other entrants ===
The following players received wildcards into the singles main draw:

- (Uzbekistan) Sanjar Fayziev
- (Uzbekistan) Jurabek Karimov
- (Uzbekistan) Shonigmatjon Shofayziyev
- (Uzbekistan) Khumoun Sultanov

The following players received entry from the qualifying draw:

- (Croatia) Ivan Dodig
- (Russia) Mikhail Elgin
- (Russia) Alexander Vasilenko
- (Russia) Anton Zaitcev

== Champions ==
=== Singles ===
- (Russia) Konstantin Kravchuk def. (Uzbekistan) Denis Istomin, 7–5, 6–4.

=== Doubles ===
- (Russia) Mikhail Elgin / (Uzbekistan) Denis Istomin def. (Germany) Andre Begemann / (India) Leander Paes, 6–4, 6–2.
