= 2009 Tashkent Challenger – Doubles =

Doubles
- 2009 Tashkent Challenger

Final
- Champions: (Uzbekistan) Murad Inoyatov (Uzbekistan) Denis Istomin
- Runners-up: (Czech Republic) Jiří Krkoška (Slovakia) Lukáš Lacko
- Score: 7–6(4), 6–4

Events
Singles	Doubles
- Tashkent Challenger

Flavio Cipolla and Pavel Šnobel were the defending champions; however, they decided to not compete this year.
Murad Inoyatov and Denis Istomin won the tournament in their country, after defeating Jiří Krkoška and Lukáš Lacko in the final.

== Seeds ==
1. (Ukraine) Sergei Bubka / (Ukraine) Sergiy Stakhovsky (quarterfinals)
2. (India) Rohan Bopanna / (Chinese Taipei) Lu Yen-hsun (semifinals)
3. (Russia) Konstantin Kravchuk / (Russia) Alexandre Kudryavtsev (first round)
4. (Russia) Michail Elgin / (Russia) Evgeny Kirillov (quarterfinals)

== Draw ==
Key

- Q = Qualifier
- WC = Wild card
- LL = Lucky loser
- Alt = Alternate
- ITF = ITF entry
- PR = Protected ranking
- SR = Special ranking
- SE = Special exempt
- JE = Junior exempt
- JR = Junior Accelerator Programme entrant
- CO = College Accelerator Programme entrant
- NG = Next Gen Accelerator Program entrant
- w/o = Walkover
- r = Retired
- d = Defaulted

=== Draw ===
First round
1	(Ukraine) S Bubka (Ukraine) S Stakhovsky	6	6
(Russia) A Kumantsov (Netherlands) M Middelkoop	3	2
WC	(Uzbekistan) Rifat Biktyakov (Uzbekistan) S Ikramov	6	6
WC	(Uzbekistan) Sanjar Fayziev (Uzbekistan) Abduvoris Saidmukhamedov	2	2
3	(Russia) K Kravchuk (Russia) A Kudryavtsev	6	6^{10}	[10]
(Slovakia) M Kližan (Kazakhstan) Y Schukin	4	7	[12]
(Czech Republic) J Krkoška (Slovakia) L Lacko	6	6
(Ukraine) O Dolgopolov Jr. (Ukraine) I Sergeyev	2	2
(Uzbekistan) M Inoyatov (Uzbekistan) D Istomin	7	6
ALT	(Uzbekistan) Arsen Asanov (Russia) T Gabashvili	6^{4}	3
(India) S Amritraj (United States) R Ram	w/o
4	(Russia) M Elgin (Russia) E Kirillov
(Spain) I Cervantes-Huegun (Spain) G Olaso	3	6	[10]
(India) S Devvarman (India) P Raja	6	3	[4]
WC	(Latvia) D Pavlovs (Uzbekistan) Vaja Uzakov	4	7	[10]
2	(India) R Bopanna (Chinese Taipei) Y-h Lu	6	6^{3}	[12]

Quarterfinals
1	(Ukraine) S Bubka (Ukraine) S Stakhovsky	4	4
WC	(Uzbekistan) R Biktyakov (Uzbekistan) S Ikramov	6	6
(Slovakia) M Kližan (Kazakhstan) Y Schukin	5	7	[11]
(Czech Republic) J Krkoška (Slovakia) L Lacko	7	6^{5}	[13]
(Uzbekistan) M Inoyatov (Uzbekistan) D Istomin	6	6
4	(Russia) M Elgin (Russia) E Kirillov	3	0
(Spain) I Cervantes-Huegun (Spain) G Olaso	3	4
2	(India) R Bopanna (Chinese Taipei) Y-h Lu	6	6

Semifinals
WC	(Uzbekistan) R Biktyakov (Uzbekistan) S Ikramov	4	5
(Czech Republic) J Krkoška (Slovakia) L Lacko	6	7
(Uzbekistan) M Inoyatov (Uzbekistan) D Istomin	3	6	[10]
2	(India) R Bopanna (Chinese Taipei) Y-h Lu	6	1	[5]

Finals
(Czech Republic) J Krkoška (Slovakia) L Lacko	6^{4}	4
(Uzbekistan) M Inoyatov (Uzbekistan) D Istomin	7	6
