= 2009 Tashkent Challenger =

Tennis tournament

- Date: 12–18 October
- Edition: 2nd
- Surface: Hard
- Location: Tashkent, Uzbekistan

Champions

Singles
- (Cyprus) Marcos Baghdatis

Doubles
- (Uzbekistan) Murad Inoyatov / (Uzbekistan) Denis Istomin
- Tashkent Challenger

The 2009 Tashkent Challenger was a professional tennis tournament played on indoor hard courts. It was the second edition of the tournament which was part of the 2009 ATP Challenger Tour. It took place in Tashkent, Uzbekistan between 12 and 18 October 2009.

== Singles main-draw entrants ==
=== Seeds ===
Country	Player	Rank^{1}	Seed
TPE	Lu Yen-hsun	76	1
UZB	Denis Istomin	89	2
CYP	Marcos Baghdatis	90	3
BEL	Christophe Rochus	93	4
RUS	Teymuraz Gabashvili	102	5
USA	Rajeev Ram	103	6
IND	Somdev Devvarman	129	7
UKR	Sergiy Stakhovsky	133	8

- Rankings are as of October 5, 2009.

=== Other entrants ===
The following players received wildcards into the singles main draw:

- (Uzbekistan) Rifat Biktyakov
- (India) Rohan Bopanna
- (Uzbekistan) Murad Inoyatov
- (Uzbekistan) Vaja Uzakov

The following players received entry from the qualifying draw:

- (Uzbekistan) Arsen Asanov (as a Lucky loser)
- (Moldova) Andrei Gorban
- (Uzbekistan) Sarvar Ikramov
- (Russia) Konstantin Kravchuk
- (Czech Republic) Jiří Krkoška

== Champions ==
=== Singles ===
(Cyprus) Marcos Baghdatis def. (Uzbekistan) Denis Istomin, 6–3, 1–6, 6–3

=== Doubles ===
(Uzbekistan) Murad Inoyatov / (Uzbekistan) Denis Istomin def. (Czech Republic) Jiří Krkoška / (Slovakia) Lukáš Lacko, 7–6(4), 6–4
