= 2014 Tashkent Challenger – Singles =

Singles
- 2014 Tashkent Challenger

Final
- Champion: (Slovakia) Lukáš Lacko
- Runner-up: (Ukraine) Sergiy Stakhovsky
- Score: 6–2, 6–3

Events
Singles	Doubles
- Tashkent Challenger

Dudi Sela was the defending champion, but he chose not to compete this year.

Lukáš Lacko won the title by defeating Sergiy Stakhovsky 6–2, 6–3 in the final.

== Seeds ==
1. (Serbia) Dušan Lajović (quarterfinals)
2. (Ukraine) Sergiy Stakhovsky (final)
3. (Slovakia) Lukáš Lacko (champion)
4. (France) Adrian Mannarino (semifinals)
5. (Bosnia and Herzegovina) Damir Džumhur (first round)
6. (Kazakhstan) Aleksandr Nedovyesov (quarterfinals)
7. (Uzbekistan) Farrukh Dustov (second round)
8. (Russia) Alexander Kudryavtsev (second round)

== Draw ==
Key

- Q = Qualifier
- WC = Wild card
- LL = Lucky loser
- Alt = Alternate
- ITF = ITF entry
- PR = Protected ranking
- SR = Special ranking
- SE = Special exempt
- JE = Junior exempt
- JR = Junior Accelerator Programme entrant
- CO = College Accelerator Programme entrant
- NG = Next Gen Accelerator Program entrant
- w/o = Walkover
- r = Retired
- d = Defaulted

=== Finals ===
Semifinals
(Croatia) Borna Ćorić	5	6^{3}
3	(Slovakia) Lukáš Lacko	7	7^{7}
4	(France) Adrian Mannarino	6^{5}	4
2	(Ukraine) Sergiy Stakhovsky	7^{7}	6

Final
3	(Slovakia) Lukáš Lacko	6	6
2	(Ukraine) Sergiy Stakhovsky	2	3

=== Top half ===
First round
1	(Serbia) D Lajović	6	7
(Russia) K Kravchuk	4	5
(Belgium) Y Mertens	6	4	3
(France) L Pouille	4	6	6
Q	(Belarus) S Betov	6^{1}	0
(Croatia) B Ćorić	7^{7}	6
WC	(Uzbekistan) D Karimov	6	3	2
8	(Russia) A Kudryavtsev	1	6	6
3	(Slovakia) L Lacko	6	6
Q	(Italy) R Ghedin	2	0
(Ukraine) D Molchanov	6^{2}	6	7^{7}
(France) F Martin	7^{7}	3	6^{3}
WC	(Uzbekistan) Shonigmatjon Shofayziyev	1	1
(Chinese Taipei) T Chen	6	6
Q	(Ukraine) M Deviatiarov	3	4
6	(Kazakhstan) A Nedovyesov	6	6

Second round
1	(Serbia) D Lajović	7^{13}	5	6
(France) L Pouille	6^{11}	7	4
(Croatia) B Ćorić	4	6	6
8	(Russia) A Kudryavtsev	6	4	3
3	(Slovakia) L Lacko	6	7
(Ukraine) D Molchanov	2	5
(Chinese Taipei) T Chen	3	3
6	(Kazakhstan) A Nedovyesov	6	6

Quarterfinals
1	(Serbia) D Lajović	6^{5}	5
(Croatia) B Ćorić	7^{7}	7
3	(Slovakia) L Lacko	3	6	6
6	(Kazakhstan) A Nedovyesov	6	1	2

Semifinals
(Croatia) B Ćorić	5	6^{3}
3	(Slovakia) L Lacko	7	7^{7}

=== Bottom half ===
First round
5	(Bosnia and Herzegovina) D Džumhur	2	6^{6}
(Russia) A Karatsev	6	7^{8}
(Russia) E Donskoy	7	6
WC	(Uzbekistan) T Ismailov	5	4
(Belarus) E Gerasimov	7^{8}	6
(Chinese Taipei) L-C Huang	6^{6}	4
WC	(Uzbekistan) S Fayziev	4	2
4	(France) A Mannarino	6	6
7	(Uzbekistan) F Dustov	6^{1}	7^{7}	7^{7}
(Moldova) R Albot	7^{7}	6^{3}	6^{2}
(Russia) A Zaitcev	6	6
Q	(Kyrgyzstan) D Duldaev	4	3
(Croatia) A Pavić	4	7^{9}	6^{2}
(Italy) A Arnaboldi	6	6^{7}	7^{7}
(Spain) A Menéndez Maceiras	7^{7}	1	2
2	(Ukraine) S Stakhovsky	6^{2}	6	6

Second round
(Russia) A Karatsev	6^{5}	2
(Russia) E Donskoy	7^{7}	6
(Belarus) E Gerasimov	3	1
4	(France) A Mannarino	6	6
7	(Uzbekistan) F Dustov	3	7^{7}	6^{5}
(Russia) A Zaitcev	6	6^{3}	7^{7}
(Italy) A Arnaboldi	2	4
2	(Ukraine) S Stakhovsky	6	6

Quarterfinals
(Russia) E Donskoy	3	6	2
4	(France) A Mannarino	6	4	6
(Russia) A Zaitcev	6	5	4
2	(Ukraine) S Stakhovsky	4	7	6

Semifinals
4	(France) A Mannarino	6^{5}	4
2	(Ukraine) S Stakhovsky	7^{7}	6
