= 2012 Tashkent Challenger – Singles =

Singles
- 2012 Tashkent Challenger

Final
- Champion: (Belarus) Uladzimir Ignatik
- Runner-up: (Slovakia) Lukáš Lacko
- Score: 6–3, 7–6^{(7–3)}

Events
Singles	Doubles
- Tashkent Challenger

Denis Istomin was the defending champion but decided not to participate.
Uladzimir Ignatik won the final 6–3, 7–6^{(7–3)} against Lukáš Lacko.

== Seeds ==
1. (Slovakia) Lukáš Lacko (final)
2. (Italy) Flavio Cipolla (second round)
3. (Israel) Dudi Sela (quarterfinals)
4. (Tunisia) Malek Jaziri (second round)
5. (Croatia) Ivan Dodig (semifinals)
6. (Canada) Vasek Pospisil (first round)
7. (Russia) Dmitry Tursunov (second round)
8. (Slovakia) Karol Beck (second round)

== Draw ==
Key

- Q = Qualifier
- WC = Wild card
- LL = Lucky loser
- Alt = Alternate
- ITF = ITF entry
- PR = Protected ranking
- SR = Special ranking
- SE = Special exempt
- JE = Junior exempt
- JR = Junior Accelerator Programme entrant
- CO = College Accelerator Programme entrant
- NG = Next Gen Accelerator Program entrant
- w/o = Walkover
- r = Retired
- d = Defaulted

=== Finals ===
Semifinals
1	(Slovakia) Lukáš Lacko	6	7^{7}
5	(Croatia) Ivan Dodig	4	6^{4}
(Czech Republic) Jan Mertl	3	3
(Belarus) Uladzimir Ignatik	6	6

Final
1	(Slovakia) Lukáš Lacko	3	6^{3}
(Belarus) Uladzimir Ignatik	6	7^{7}

=== Top half ===
First round
1	(Slovakia) L Lacko	6	6
(Ukraine) I Sergeyev	2	3
Q	(India) S Singh	0	4
Q	(Ukraine) O Nedovyesov	6	6
(Israel) A Weintraub	6	4	7
(Australia) B Klein	4	6	5
(India) Y Bhambri	1	3
8	(Slovakia) K Beck	6	6
3	(Israel) D Sela	7	6
(Russia) K Kravchuk	5	0
Q	(India) V Vardhan	3	4
(Russia) I Kunitsyn	6	6
Q	(Ukraine) D Molchanov	4	1
(Spain) A Menéndez	6	6
(Czech Republic) I Minář	2	4
5	(Croatia) I Dodig	6	6

Second round
1	(Slovakia) L Lacko	6	6
Q	(Ukraine) O Nedovyesov	2	2
(Israel) A Weintraub	6	6
8	(Slovakia) K Beck	3	3
3	(Israel) D Sela	4	7^{7}	6
(Russia) I Kunitsyn	6	6^{2}	4
(Spain) A Menéndez	0	3
5	(Croatia) I Dodig	6	6

Quarterfinals
1	(Slovakia) L Lacko	6	6
(Israel) A Weintraub	2	4
3	(Israel) D Sela	4	6	3
5	(Croatia) I Dodig	6	4	6

Semifinals
1	(Slovakia) L Lacko	6	7^{7}
5	(Croatia) I Dodig	4	6^{4}

=== Bottom half ===
First round
7	(Russia) D Tursunov	6	4
(Spain) D Muñoz de la Nava	3	2^{r}
WC	(Uzbekistan) Nigmat Shofayziev	6^{2}	4
(Serbia) D Lajović	7^{7}	6
(Germany) D Meffert	4	6	6^{9}
(Czech Republic) J Mertl	6	2	7^{11}
(Germany) P Gojowczyk	4	4
4	(Tunisia) M Jaziri	6	6
6	(Canada) V Pospisil	2	6	3
WC	(Uzbekistan) F Dustov	6	3	6
WC	(Uzbekistan) S Ikramov	3	5
(Kazakhstan) A Golubev	6	7
(Japan) H Moriya	4	4
(Belarus) U Ignatik	6	6
WC	(Uzbekistan) Sergey Shipilov	1	6	0
2	(Italy) F Cipolla	6	4	6

Second round
7	(Russia) D Tursunov	4	7^{7}	1
(Serbia) D Lajović	6	6^{5}	6
(Czech Republic) J Mertl	6	7^{7}
4	(Tunisia) M Jaziri	3	6^{5}
WC	(Uzbekistan) F Dustov	7^{7}	7
(Kazakhstan) A Golubev	6^{4}	5
(Belarus) U Ignatik	6	6^{0}	6
2	(Italy) F Cipolla	3	7^{7}	3

Quarterfinals
(Serbia) D Lajović	4	4
(Czech Republic) J Mertl	6	6
WC	(Uzbekistan) F Dustov	4	7	6^{2}
(Belarus) U Ignatik	6	5	7^{7}

Semifinals
(Czech Republic) J Mertl	3	3
(Belarus) U Ignatik	6	6
