= 2018 Tashkent Challenger – Singles =

Singles
- 2018 Tashkent Challenger

Final
- Champion: (Canada) Félix Auger-Aliassime
- Runner-up: (Poland) Kamil Majchrzak
- Score: 6–3, 6–2

Events
Singles	Doubles
- Tashkent Challenger

Guillermo García López was the defending champion but chose not to defend his title.

Félix Auger-Aliassime won the title after defeating Kamil Majchrzak 6–3, 6–2 in the final.

== Seeds ==
1. (Bosnia and Herzegovina) Mirza Bašić (quarterfinals)
2. (Uzbekistan) Denis Istomin (quarterfinals)
3. (Spain) Enrique López Pérez (first round)
4. (Czech Republic) Lukáš Rosol (first round, withdrew)
5. (Russia) Alexey Vatutin (second round)
6. (Poland) Kamil Majchrzak (final)
7. (Germany) Daniel Brands (second round)
8. (Egypt) Mohamed Safwat (second round)

== Draw ==
Key

- Q = Qualifier
- WC = Wild card
- LL = Lucky loser
- Alt = Alternate
- ITF = ITF entry
- PR = Protected ranking
- SR = Special ranking
- SE = Special exempt
- JE = Junior exempt
- JR = Junior Accelerator Programme entrant
- CO = College Accelerator Programme entrant
- NG = Next Gen Accelerator Program entrant
- w/o = Walkover
- r = Retired
- d = Defaulted

=== Finals ===
Semifinals
6	(Poland) Kamil Majchrzak	7^{7}	6
(Germany) Tobias Kamke	6^{2}	3
PR	(Belarus) Egor Gerasimov	4	6^{4}
Q	(Canada) Félix Auger-Aliassime	6	7^{7}

Final
6	(Poland) Kamil Majchrzak	3	2
Q	(Canada) Félix Auger-Aliassime	6	6

=== Top half ===
First round
1	(Bosnia and Herzegovina) M Bašić	7	6
(Russia) I Nedelko	5	4
(Portugal) G Oliveira	6	6
WC	(Russia) Dimitriy Voronin	3	2
WC	(Russia) A Avidzba	3	0
(Kazakhstan) A Nedovyesov	6	6
(Czech Republic) Z Kolář	2	2
6	(Poland) K Majchrzak	6	6
4	(Czech Republic) L Rosol
(Serbia) N Milojević	w/o
(Russia) E Karlovskiy	7^{7}	6
(South Korea) D-h Lee	6^{3}	4
Q	(New Zealand) R Statham	4	3
(Germany) T Kamke	6	6
WC	(Uzbekistan) J Karimov	4	3
8	(Egypt) M Safwat	6	6

Second round
1	(Bosnia and Herzegovina) M Bašić	7	7^{7}
(Portugal) G Oliveira	5	6^{5}
(Kazakhstan) A Nedovyesov	3	6	1
6	(Poland) K Majchrzak	6	2	6
(Serbia) N Milojević	2	7	1
(Russia) E Karlovskiy	6	5	6
(Germany) T Kamke	6	7
8	(Egypt) M Safwat	0	5

Quarterfinals
1	(Bosnia and Herzegovina) M Bašić	1	4
6	(Poland) K Majchrzak	6	6
(Russia) E Karlovskiy	6^{3}	1
(Germany) T Kamke	7^{7}	6

Semifinals
6	(Poland) K Majchrzak	7^{7}	6
(Germany) T Kamke	6^{2}	3

=== Bottom half ===
First round
7	(Germany) D Brands	3	7^{7}	6
(Belarus) U Ignatik	6	6^{2}	4
PR	(Belarus) E Gerasimov	6	7^{7}
LL	(Russia) R Safiullin	3	6^{4}
WC	(Uzbekistan) K Sultanov	6^{2}	4
(Australia) A Santillan	7^{7}	6
Q	(France) M Bourgue	7	6
3	(Spain) E López Pérez	5	3
5	(Russia) A Vatutin	6	6
Q	(Portugal) F Ferreira Silva	1	2
(Serbia) D Petrović	4	5
Q	(Canada) F Auger-Aliassime	6	7
(Kazakhstan) A Bublik	3	6	6
(Chinese Taipei) T-h Yang	6	3	4
(Italy) F Gaio	3	4
2	(Uzbekistan) D Istomin	6	6

Second round
7	(Germany) D Brands	6^{8}	4
PR	(Belarus) E Gerasimov	7^{10}	6
(Australia) A Santillan	4	1
Q	(France) M Bourgue	6	6
5	(Russia) A Vatutin	3	6	6^{7}
Q	(Canada) F Auger-Aliassime	6	2	7^{9}
(Kazakhstan) A Bublik	6^{6}	1
2	(Uzbekistan) D Istomin	7^{8}	6

Quarterfinals
PR	(Belarus) E Gerasimov	7^{7}	3	6
Q	(France) M Bourgue	6^{5}	6	1
Q	(Canada) F Auger-Aliassime	7^{7}	6
2	(Uzbekistan) D Istomin	6^{4}	3

Semifinals
PR	(Belarus) E Gerasimov	4	6^{4}
Q	(Canada) F Auger-Aliassime	6	7^{7}
