= 2010 Tashkent Challenger – Singles =

Singles
- 2010 Tashkent Challenger

Final
- Champion: (Slovakia) Karol Beck
- Runner-up: (Luxembourg) Gilles Müller
- Score: 6–7(4), 6–4, 7–5

Events
Singles	Doubles
- Tashkent Challenger

Marcos Baghdatis was the defending champion but decided not to participate this year.
Karol Beck won against Gilles Müller 6–7(4), 6–4, 7–5 in the final.

== Seeds ==
1. (Germany) Rainer Schüttler (quarterfinals)
2. (India) Somdev Devvarman (second round)
3. (Portugal) Frederico Gil (second round)
4. (Jamaica) Dustin Brown (semifinals)
5. (Slovakia) Karol Beck (champion)
6. (Russia) Konstantin Kravchuk (first round)
7. (Luxembourg) Gilles Müller (final)
8. (Austria) Andreas Haider-Maurer (semifinals)

== Draw ==
Key

- Q = Qualifier
- WC = Wild card
- LL = Lucky loser
- Alt = Alternate
- ITF = ITF entry
- PR = Protected ranking
- SR = Special ranking
- SE = Special exempt
- JE = Junior exempt
- JR = Junior Accelerator Programme entrant
- CO = College Accelerator Programme entrant
- NG = Next Gen Accelerator Program entrant
- w/o = Walkover
- r = Retired
- d = Defaulted

=== Finals ===
Semifinals
8	(Austria) Andreas Haider-Maurer	3	4
7	(Luxembourg) Gilles Müller	6	6
4	(Jamaica) Dustin Brown	4	7	2
5	(Slovakia) Karol Beck	6	6^{3}	6

Final
7	(Luxembourg) Gilles Müller	7	4	5
5	(Slovakia) Karol Beck	6^{4}	6	7

=== Top half ===
First round
1	(Germany) R Schüttler	6	6
(Slovakia) M Semjan	1	4
(Switzerland) M Lammer	4	3
(Austria) A Peya	6	6
WC	(Uzbekistan) M Inoyatov	7	6
(Slovakia) A Martin	6^{7}	4
(Czech Republic) D Lojda	3	4
8	(Austria) A Haider-Maurer	6	6
3	(Portugal) F Gil	6	7
(Spain) A Menéndez Maceiras	4	6^{6}
(France) L Recouderc	6^{3}	7	4
WC	(Uzbekistan) F Dustov	7	6^{4}	6
(Ukraine) I Sergeyev	6	6
WC	(Uzbekistan) V Uzakov	2	4
(Russia) A Kuznetsov	6^{5}	5
7	(Luxembourg) G Müller	7	7

Second round
1	(Germany) R Schüttler	6	6
(Austria) A Peya	3	4
WC	(Uzbekistan) M Inoyatov	6^{2}	2
8	(Austria) A Haider-Maurer	7	6
3	(Portugal) F Gil	4	1
WC	(Uzbekistan) F Dustov	6	6
(Ukraine) I Sergeyev	5	1^{r}
7	(Luxembourg) G Müller	7	3

Quarterfinals
1	(Germany) R Schüttler	2	6	5
8	(Austria) A Haider-Maurer	6	3	7
WC	(Uzbekistan) F Dustov	3	6	3
7	(Luxembourg) G Müller	6	1	6

Semifinals
8	(Austria) A Haider-Maurer	3	4
7	(Luxembourg) G Müller	6	6

=== Bottom half ===
First round
6	(Russia) K Kravchuk	6^{4}	4
(Croatia) F Škugor	7	6
WC	(Uzbekistan) S Shipilov	2	2
(Belarus) U Ignatik	6	6
Q	(Canada) V Pospisil	6	6
(Russia) A Kudryavtsev	4	3
(Germany) S Stadler	6^{5}	6^{4}
4	(Jamaica) D Brown	7	7
5	(Slovakia) K Beck	6	6
Q	(France) C Reix	1	1
Q	(Australia) R Junaid	2	6	6
ALT	(Israel) N Okun	6	3	2
(Russia) E Kirillov	2	3
(Canada) M Raonic	6	6
Q	(Croatia) A Pavić	2	4
2	(India) S Devvarman	6	6

Second round
(Croatia) F Škugor	6^{5}	6	6^{4}
(Belarus) U Ignatik	7	3	7
Q	(Canada) V Pospisil	4	4
4	(Jamaica) D Brown	6	6
5	(Slovakia) K Beck	6	4	6
Q	(Australia) R Junaid	4	6	3
(Canada) M Raonic	6	7
2	(India) S Devvarman	4	6^{5}

Quarterfinals
(Belarus) U Ignatik	5	7	4
4	(Jamaica) D Brown	7	6^{1}	6
5	(Slovakia) K Beck	6	1
(Canada) M Raonic	3	0	r

Semifinals
4	(Jamaica) D Brown	4	7	2
5	(Slovakia) K Beck	6	6^{4}	6
