= 2008 Tashkent Challenger =

- Date: 13–19 October
- Edition: 1st
- Surface: Hard
- Location: Tashkent, Uzbekistan

Champions

Singles
- (Chinese Taipei) Lu Yen-hsun

Doubles
- (Italy) Flavio Cipolla / (Czech Republic) Pavel Šnobel
- Tashkent Challenger

The 2008 Tashkent Challenger was a professional tennis tournament played on indoor hard courts. It was the second edition of the tournament which was part of the 2008 ATP Challenger Series. It took place in Tashkent, Uzbekistan between 13 and 19 October 2008.

== Singles main-draw entrants ==
=== Seeds ===
Country	Player	Rank^{1}	Seed
TPE	Lu Yen-hsun	69	1
ISR	Dudi Sela	70	2
GER	Denis Gremelmayr	84	3
GER	Michael Berrer	105	4
GER	Björn Phau	117	5
UZB	Denis Istomin	121	6
ITA	Flavio Cipolla	124	7
JPN	Go Soeda	128	8

- Rankings are as of October 6, 2008.

=== Other entrants ===
The following players received wildcards into the singles main draw:

- (Uzbekistan) Farrukh Dustov
- (Israel) Dudi Sela
- (Uzbekistan) Murad Inoyatov
- (Uzbekistan) Vaja Uzakov

The following players received entry from the qualifying draw:

- (India) Rohan Bopanna
- (Austria) Oliver Marach
- (Israel) Noam Okun
- (United States) Nathan Thompson

== Champions ==
=== Singles ===
(Chinese Taipei) Lu Yen-hsun def. (France) Mathieu Montcourt, 6–3, 6–2

=== Doubles ===
(Italy) Flavio Cipolla / (Czech Republic) Pavel Šnobel def. (Russia) Mikhail Elgin / (Russia) Alexander Kudryavtsev, 6–3, 6–4
