= 2014 Tashkent Challenger – Doubles =

Doubles
- 2014 Tashkent Challenger

Final
- Champions: (Slovakia) Lukáš Lacko (Croatia) Ante Pavić
- Runners-up: (Germany) Frank Moser (Germany) Alexander Satschko
- Score: 6–3, 3–6, [13–11]

Events
Singles	Doubles
- Tashkent Challenger

Mikhail Elgin and Teymuraz Gabashvili were the defending champions, but Gabashvili chose not to compete this year. Elgin played alongside Alexander Kudryavtsev and lost in the first round to Frank Moser and Alexander Satschko.

Lukáš Lacko and Ante Pavić won the title, defeating Frank Moser and Alexander Satschko 6–3, 3–6, [13–11] in the final.

== Seeds ==
1. (Australia) Rameez Junaid / (Russia) Konstantin Kravchuk (quarterfinals)
2. (Belarus) Sergey Betov / (Belarus) Alexander Bury (quarterfinals)
3. (Germany) Frank Moser / (Germany) Alexander Satschko (final)
4. (Chinese Taipei) Ti Chen / (Chinese Taipei) Hsien-Yin Peng (first round)

== Draw ==
Key

- Q = Qualifier
- WC = Wild card
- LL = Lucky loser
- Alt = Alternate
- ITF = ITF entry
- PR = Protected ranking
- SR = Special ranking
- SE = Special exempt
- JE = Junior exempt
- JR = Junior Accelerator Programme entrant
- CO = College Accelerator Programme entrant
- NG = Next Gen Accelerator Program entrant
- w/o = Walkover
- r = Retired
- d = Defaulted

=== Draw ===
First round
1	(Australia) R Junaid (Russia) K Kravchuk	6	6
WC	(Uzbekistan) S Ikramov (Uzbekistan) D Karimov	2	2
(Moldova) R Albot (Uzbekistan) F Dustov	6	6
(Bosnia and Herzegovina) D Džumhur (Russia) A Karatsev	4	4
3	(Germany) F Moser (Germany) A Satschko	7^{7}	6
(Russia) M Elgin (Russia) A Kudryavtsev	6^{5}	4
WC	(Uzbekistan) S Fayziev (Uzbekistan) T Ismailov	6	3	[8]
(Italy) A Arnaboldi (Italy) R Ghedin	2	6	[10]
(France) F Martin (India) P Raja	6	6
WC	(Uzbekistan) Shonigmatjon Shofayziyev (Uzbekistan) V Uzakov	0	4
(Spain) A Menéndez-Maceiras (Kazakhstan) A Nedovyesov	6	6
4	(Chinese Taipei) T Chen (Chinese Taipei) H-Y Peng	4	3
(Slovakia) L Lacko (Croatia) A Pavić	7	7
(Ukraine) D Molchanov (Ukraine) S Stakhovsky	5	6^{5}
(Serbia) D Lajović (Serbia) G Tošić	3	3
2	(Belarus) S Betov (Belarus) A Bury	6	6

Quarterfinals
1	(Australia) R Junaid (Russia) K Kravchuk	4	3
(Moldova) R Albot (Uzbekistan) F Dustov	6	6
3	(Germany) F Moser (Germany) A Satschko	7	6
(Italy) A Arnaboldi (Italy) R Ghedin	5	1
(France) F Martin (India) P Raja	7	6^{4}	[7]
(Spain) A Menéndez-Maceiras (Kazakhstan) A Nedovyesov	5	7^{7}	[10]
(Slovakia) L Lacko (Croatia) A Pavić	4	6	[10]
2	(Belarus) S Betov (Belarus) A Bury	6	4	[7]

Semifinals
(Moldova) R Albot (Uzbekistan) F Dustov	6^{5}	6	[3]
3	(Germany) F Moser (Germany) A Satschko	7^{7}	3	[10]
(Spain) A Menéndez-Maceiras (Kazakhstan) A Nedovyesov	3	4
(Slovakia) L Lacko (Croatia) A Pavić	6	6

Final
3	(Germany) F Moser (Germany) A Satschko	3	6	[11]
(Slovakia) L Lacko (Croatia) A Pavić	6	3	[13]
