= 2012 Tashkent Challenger – Doubles =

Doubles
- 2012 Tashkent Challenger

Final
- Champions: (Germany) Andre Begemann (Germany) Martin Emmrich
- Runners-up: (Australia) Rameez Junaid (Germany) Frank Moser
- Score: 6–7^{(2–7)}, 7–6^{(7–2)}, [10–8]

Events
Singles	Doubles
- Tashkent Challenger

Harri Heliövaara and Denys Molchanov were the defending champions but Heliövaara decided not to participate.
Molchanov played alongside Uladzimir Ignatik.
Andre Begemann and Martin Emmrich won the title by defeating Rameez Junaid and Frank Moser 6–7^{(2–7)}, 7–6^{(7–2)}, [10–8] in the final.

== Seeds ==
1. (Thailand) Sanchai Ratiwatana / (Thailand) Sonchat Ratiwatana (first round)
2. (Russia) Mikhail Elgin / (Slovakia) Igor Zelenay (semifinals)
3. (Germany) Andre Begemann / (Germany) Martin Emmrich (champions)
4. (United States) James Cerretani / (Canada) Adil Shamasdin (quarterfinals)

== Draw ==
Key

- Q = Qualifier
- WC = Wild card
- LL = Lucky loser
- Alt = Alternate
- ITF = ITF entry
- PR = Protected ranking
- SR = Special ranking
- SE = Special exempt
- JE = Junior exempt
- JR = Junior Accelerator Programme entrant
- CO = College Accelerator Programme entrant
- NG = Next Gen Accelerator Program entrant
- w/o = Walkover
- r = Retired
- d = Defaulted

=== Draw ===
First round
1	(Thailand) Sa Ratiwatana (Thailand) So Ratiwatana	1	3
(Belarus) U Ignatik (Ukraine) D Molchanov	6	6
(Spain) A Menéndez (Spain) D Muñoz de la Nava	6	6
(Slovakia) K Beck (Czech Republic) I Minář	3	3
3	(Germany) A Begemann (Germany) M Emmrich	6	6
(India) Y Bhambri (India) D Sharan	4	4
(Russia) K Kravchuk (Serbia) D Lajović	6^{8}	6	[10]
WC	(Uzbekistan) Sanjar Fayziev (Uzbekistan) Nigmat Shofayziev	7^{10}	3	[5]
(Australia) R Junaid (Germany) F Moser	6	6
(Australia) B Klein (Ukraine) I Sergeyev	1	4
WC	(Uzbekistan) Temur Ismailov (Uzbekistan) Sergey Shipilov	6	2	[1]
4	(United States) J Cerretani (Canada) A Shamasdin	4	6	[10]
(Italy) F Cipolla (Germany) D Meffert	6	7^{7}
(Czech Republic) J Mertl (Canada) V Pospisil	4	6^{3}
WC	(Uzbekistan) F Dustov (Uzbekistan) S Ikramov	4	7^{13}	[6]
2	(Russia) M Elgin (Slovakia) I Zelenay	6	6^{11}	[10]

Quarterfinals
(Belarus) U Ignatik (Ukraine) D Molchanov	3	4
(Spain) A Menéndez (Spain) D Muñoz de la Nava	6	6
3	(Germany) A Begemann (Germany) M Emmrich	6	6
(Russia) K Kravchuk (Serbia) D Lajović	2	2
(Australia) R Junaid (Germany) F Moser	6	7^{8}
4	(United States) J Cerretani (Canada) A Shamasdin	4	6^{6}
(Italy) F Cipolla (Germany) D Meffert	3	6^{1}
2	(Russia) M Elgin (Slovakia) I Zelenay	6	7^{7}

Semifinals
(Spain) A Menéndez (Spain) D Muñoz de la Nava	2	2
3	(Germany) A Begemann (Germany) M Emmrich	6	6
(Australia) R Junaid (Germany) F Moser	4	6	[14]
2	(Russia) M Elgin (Slovakia) I Zelenay	6	4	[12]

Final
3	(Germany) A Begemann (Germany) M Emmrich	6^{2}	7^{7}	[10]
(Australia) R Junaid (Germany) F Moser	7^{7}	6^{2}	[8]
