= 2014 Tashkent Challenger =

- Date: 6–12 October
- Edition: 7th
- Surface: Hard
- Location: Tashkent, Uzbekistan

Champions

Singles
- (Slovakia) Lukáš Lacko

Doubles
- (Slovakia) Lukáš Lacko / (Croatia) Ante Pavić
- Tashkent Challenger

The 2014 Tashkent Challenger was a professional tennis tournament played on hard courts. It was the seventh edition of the tournament which was part of the 2014 ATP Challenger Tour. It took place in Tashkent, Uzbekistan between 6 and 12 October 2014.

== Singles main-draw entrants ==
=== Seeds ===
Country	Player	Rank^{1}	Seed
SRB	Dušan Lajović	69	1
UKR	Sergiy Stakhovsky	72	2
SVK	Lukáš Lacko	83	4
FRA	Adrian Mannarino	84	4
BIH	Damir Džumhur	106	5
KAZ	Aleksandr Nedovyesov	119	6
UZB	Farrukh Dustov	129	7
RUS	Alexander Kudryavtsev	130	8

- ^{1} Rankings are as of September 29, 2014.

=== Other entrants ===
The following players received wildcards into the singles main draw:

- (Uzbekistan) Sanjar Fayziev
- (Uzbekistan) Temur Ismailov
- (Uzbekistan) Djurabeck Karimov
- (Uzbekistan) Shonigmatjon Shofayziyev

The following players received entry from the qualifying draw:

- (Belarus) Sergey Betov
- (Ukraine) Marat Deviatiarov
- (Italy) Riccardo Ghedin
- (Kyrgyzstan) Daniiar Duldaev

== Champions ==
=== Singles ===
- (Slovakia) Lukáš Lacko def. (Ukraine) Sergiy Stakhovsky, 6–2, 6–3

=== Doubles ===
- (Slovakia) Lukáš Lacko / (Croatia) Ante Pavić def. (Germany) Frank Moser / (Germany) Alexander Satschko, 6–3, 3–6, [13–11]
