= 2018 Tashkent Challenger – Doubles =

Doubles
- 2018 Tashkent Challenger

Final
- Champions: (Uzbekistan) Sanjar Fayziev (Uzbekistan) Jurabek Karimov
- Runners-up: (Italy) Federico Gaio (Spain) Enrique López Pérez
- Score: 6–2, 6–7^{(3–7)}, [11–9]

Events
Singles	Doubles
- Tashkent Challenger

Hans Podlipnik Castillo and Andrei Vasilevski were the defending champions but only Vasilevski chose to defend his title, partnering Vladyslav Manafov. Vasilevski lost in the first round to Federico Gaio and Enrique López Pérez.

Sanjar Fayziev and Jurabek Karimov won the title after defeating Gaio and López Pérez 6–2, 6–7^{(3–7)}, [11–9] in the final.

== Seeds ==
1. (India) Sriram Balaji / (India) Vishnu Vardhan (quarterfinals)
2. (Russia) Mikhail Elgin / (Portugal) Gonçalo Oliveira (first round)
3. (Ukraine) Vladyslav Manafov / (Belarus) Andrei Vasilevski (first round)
4. (Switzerland) Luca Margaroli / (Austria) Tristan-Samuel Weissborn (semifinals)

== Draw ==
Key

- Q = Qualifier
- WC = Wild card
- LL = Lucky loser
- Alt = Alternate
- ITF = ITF entry
- PR = Protected ranking
- SR = Special ranking
- SE = Special exempt
- JE = Junior exempt
- JR = Junior Accelerator Programme entrant
- CO = College Accelerator Programme entrant
- NG = Next Gen Accelerator Program entrant
- w/o = Walkover
- r = Retired
- d = Defaulted

First round
1	(India) S Balaji (India) V Vardhan	2	6	[10]
(Belarus) U Ignatik (Poland) K Majchrzak	6	3	[3]
WC	(Uzbekistan) S Fayziev (Uzbekistan) J Karimov	7	3	[10]
(Belarus) A Bury (Belarus) Y Shyla	5	6	[8]
4	(Switzerland) L Margaroli (Austria) T-S Weissborn	6	6^{4}	[10]
(Czech Republic) Z Kolář (Poland) S Walków	4	7^{7}	[7]
WC	(Uzbekistan) S Fomin (Uzbekistan) Saida'lo Saidkarimov	2	4
(Kazakhstan) A Bublik (Kazakhstan) T Khabibulin	6	6
WC	(Uzbekistan) Shonigmatjon Shofayziyev (Uzbekistan) K Sultanov	6^{3}	3
(Russia) E Karlovskiy (Russia) A Vatutin	7^{7}	6
(Italy) F Gaio (Spain) E López Pérez	7^{9}	6
3	(Ukraine) V Manafov (Belarus) A Vasilevski	6^{7}	3
(Serbia) N Milojević (Egypt) M Safwat	7	7
(Bosnia and Herzegovina) M Bašić (Serbia) D Petrović	5	5
(Russia) A Pavlioutchenkov (Chinese Taipei) T-h Yang	4	6	[10]
2	(Russia) M Elgin (Portugal) G Oliveira	6	4	[5]

Quarterfinals
1	(India) S Balaji (India) V Vardhan	6^{4}	6^{3}
WC	(Uzbekistan) S Fayziev (Uzbekistan) J Karimov	7^{7}	7^{7}
4	(Switzerland) L Margaroli (Austria) T-S Weissborn	6	6
(Kazakhstan) A Bublik (Kazakhstan) T Khabibulin	1	4
(Russia) E Karlovskiy (Russia) A Vatutin	2	3
(Italy) F Gaio (Spain) E López Pérez	6	6
(Serbia) N Milojević (Egypt) M Safwat	6	4	[7]
(Russia) A Pavlioutchenkov (Chinese Taipei) T-h Yang	4	6	[10]

Semifinals
WC	(Uzbekistan) S Fayziev (Uzbekistan) J Karimov	6	6
4	(Switzerland) L Margaroli (Austria) T-S Weissborn	4	4
(Italy) F Gaio (Spain) E López Pérez	6	7^{7}
(Russia) A Pavlioutchenkov (Chinese Taipei) T-h Yang	3	6^{3}

Final
WC	(Uzbekistan) S Fayziev (Uzbekistan) J Karimov	6	6^{3}	[11]
(Italy) F Gaio (Spain) E López Pérez	2	7^{7}	[9]
