= 2018 Tashkent Challenger =

- Date: 8–13 October
- Edition: 11th
- Surface: Hard
- Location: Tashkent, Uzbekistan

Champions

Singles
- (Canada) Félix Auger-Aliassime

Doubles
- (Uzbekistan) Sanjar Fayziev / (Uzbekistan) Jurabek Karimov
- Tashkent Challenger

The 2018 Tashkent Challenger was a professional tennis tournament played on hard courts. It was the eleventh edition of the tournament which was part of the 2018 ATP Challenger Tour. It took place in Tashkent, Uzbekistan between 8 and 13 October 2018.

== Singles main-draw entrants ==
=== Seeds ===
Country	Player	Rank^{1}	Seed
BIH	Mirza Bašić	77	1
UZB	Denis Istomin	103	2
ESP	Enrique López Pérez	167	3
~~CZE~~	~~Lukáš Rosol~~	~~177~~	~~4~~
RUS	Alexey Vatutin	178	5
POL	Kamil Majchrzak	181	6
GER	Daniel Brands	185	7
EGY	Mohamed Safwat	196	8

- ^{1} Rankings are as of 1 October 2018.

=== Other entrants ===
The following players received wildcards into the singles main draw:

- (Russia) Alen Avidzba
- (Uzbekistan) Jurabek Karimov
- (Uzbekistan) Khumoyun Sultanov
- (Russia) Dimitriy Voronin

The following player received entry into the singles main draw using a protected ranking:

- (Belarus) Egor Gerasimov

The following players received entry from the qualifying draw:

- (Canada) Félix Auger-Aliassime
- (France) Mathias Bourgue
- (Portugal) Frederico Ferreira Silva
- (New Zealand) Rubin Statham

The following player received entry as a lucky loser:

- (Russia) Roman Safiullin

== Champions ==
=== Singles ===
- (Canada) Félix Auger-Aliassime def. (Poland) Kamil Majchrzak 6–3, 6–2.

=== Doubles ===
- (Uzbekistan) Sanjar Fayziev / (Uzbekistan) Jurabek Karimov def. (Italy) Federico Gaio / (Spain) Enrique López Pérez 6–2, 6–7^{(3–7)}, [11–9].
