= Frank Moser (tennis) =

German tennis player

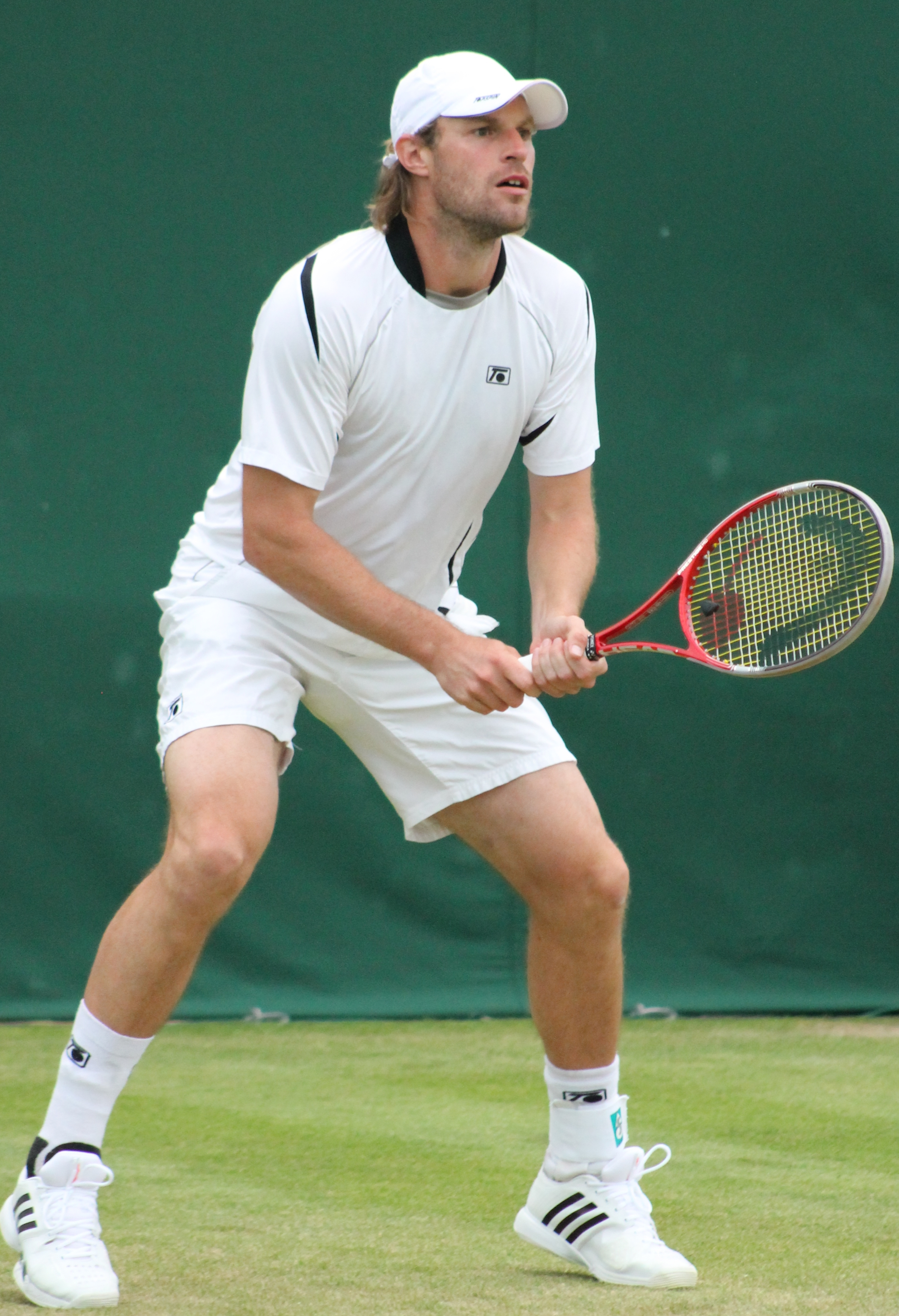
- Frank Moser at the 2013 Wimbledon Championships
- Country (sports): Germany
- Residence: Baden-Baden, Germany
- Born: 23 September 1976 (age 48); Baden-Baden, West Germany
- Height: 1.93 m (6 ft 4 in)
- Turned pro: 2001
- Retired: 2017
- Plays: Right-handed (two-handed backhand)
- Prize money: $543,117

Singles
- Career record: 0–2
- Career titles: 0
- Highest ranking: No. 288 (18 August 2003)

Grand Slam singles results
- Australian Open: Q1 (2005)

Doubles
- Career record: 60–95
- Career titles: 1
- Highest ranking: No. 47 (21 May 2012)

Grand Slam doubles results
- Australian Open: 1R (2012, 2013)
- French Open: 2R (2015)
- Wimbledon: 2R (2009, 2011, 2012, 2013)
- US Open: 2R (2011)

Frank Moser (German pronunciation: [ˈfʁaŋk ˈmoːzɐ]; born 23 September 1976) is a German retired professional tennis player. He was a doubles specialist. As a career highlight he beat with partner Ivo Karlović the world's top-ranked doubles team, the Bryan brothers, at the 2011 US Open – Men's doubles. Moser won his only ATP World Tour title in San Jose in 2013.

== Doubles performance timeline ==
Key
W	F	SF	QF	#R	RR	Q#	DNQ	A	NH

(W) winner; (F) finalist; (SF) semifinalist; (QF) quarterfinalist; (#R) rounds 4, 3, 2, 1; (RR) round-robin stage; (Q#) qualification round; (DNQ) did not qualify; (A) absent; (NH) not held; (SR) strike rate (events won / competed); (W–L) win–loss record.

Tournament	2001	2002	2003	2004	2005	2006	2007	2008	2009	2010	2011	2012	2013	2014	2015	2016	2017	SR	W–L
Grand Slam tournaments
Australian Open	A	A	A	A	A	A	A	A	A	A	A	1R	1R	A	A	A	A	0 / 2	0–2
French Open	A	A	A	A	A	A	A	A	1R	A	A	1R	1R	A	2R	A	A	0 / 4	1–4
Wimbledon	A	A	A	A	A	A	A	A	2R	Q1	2R	2R	2R	A	Q1	Q1	A	0 / 4	4–4
US Open	A	A	A	A	A	A	A	A	1R	A	2R	1R	A	A	1R	A	A	0 / 4	1–4
Win–loss	0–0	0–0	0–0	0–0	0–0	0–0	0–0	0–0	1–3	0–0	2–2	1–4	1–3	0–0	1–2	0–0	0–0	0 / 14	6–14
Career statistics
Titles / Finals	0 / 0	0 / 0	0 / 0	0 / 0	0 / 0	0 / 0	0 / 0	0 / 0	0 / 1	0 / 0	0 / 1	0 / 1	1 / 1	0 / 0	0 / 0	0 / 0	0 / 0	1 / 4	
Overall win–loss	0–0	0–0	0–0	0–0	0–0	0–2	1–3	6–5	4–13	0–5	12–12	19–21	10–14	2–7	3–9	3–4	0–0	60–95	
Year-end ranking	341	306	358	173	284	138	141	93	108	114	76	67	97	133	118	217	N/A	39%	

== ATP career finals ==
=== Doubles: 4 (1 title, 3 runner-ups) ===
Legend Grand Slam tournaments (0–0) ATP World Tour Finals (0–0) ATP World Tour Masters 1000 (0–0) ATP World Tour 500 Series (0–0) ATP World Tour 250 Series (1–3)	Finals by surface Hard (1–3) Clay (0–0) Grass (0–0) Carpet (0–0)

Result	W–L	Date	Tournament	Surface	Partner	Opponents	Score
Loss	0–1	Aug 2009	Los Angeles Open, United States	Hard	(Germany) Benjamin Becker	(United States) Bob Bryan (United States) Mike Bryan	4–6, 6–7^{(2–7)}
Loss	0–2	Jul 2011	Atlanta Open, United States	Hard	(Germany) Matthias Bachinger	(United States) Alex Bogomolov Jr. (Australia) Matthew Ebden	6–3, 5–7, [8–10]
Loss	0–3	Feb 2012	San Jose Open, United States	Hard (i)	(South Africa) Kevin Anderson	(The Bahamas) Mark Knowles (Belgium) Xavier Malisse	4–6, 6–1, [5–10]
Win	1–3	Feb 2013	San Jose Open, United States	Hard (i)	(Belgium) Xavier Malisse	(Australia) Lleyton Hewitt (Australia) Marinko Matosevic	6–0, 6–7^{(5–7)}, [10–4]

== ATP Challengers and ITF Futures finals ==
=== Singles: 4 (0–4) ===
Legend
ATPChallenger (0–1)
ITF Futures (0–3)

Result	W–L	Date	Tournament	Tier	Surface	Opponent	Score
Loss	0–1	Sep 2001	Kawaguchi, Japan	Futures	Hard	(United States) Doug Bohaboy	3–6, 4–6
Loss	0–1	Dec 2002	Bangkok, Thailand	Challenger	Hard	(Netherlands) John van Lottum	5–7, 4–6
Loss	0–2	Jun 2003	Leun, Germany	Futures	Clay	(Germany) Sebastian Jäger	4–6, 6–3, 4–6
Loss	0–3	Dec 2005	Chandigarh, India	Futures	Hard	(Pakistan) Aisam-ul-Haq Qureshi	6–7^{(6–8)}, 7–6^{(7–5)}, 4–6

=== Doubles: 60 (25–35) ===
Legend
ATP Challenger (15–21)
ITF Futures (10–14)

Result	W–L	Date	Tournament	Tier	Surface	Partner	Opponents	Score
Loss	0–1	Jul 1999	Kassel, Germany	Futures	Clay	(Germany) Bernard Parun	(Russia) Yuri Schukin (Germany) Andreas Tattermusch	4–6, 1–6
Win	1–1	Jul 2000	Bourg-en-Bresse, France	Futures	Clay	(Germany) Tobias Clemens	(South Africa) Pieter Calitz (France) Benjamin Cassaigne	6–4, 6–4
Loss	1–2	Jun 2001	Villingen, Germany	Futures	Clay	(Germany) Bernard Parun	(Sweden) Johan Settergren (Netherlands) Melle van Gemerden	4–6, 4–6
Loss	1–3	Jul 2001	Pécs, Hungary	Futures	Clay	(Argentina) José María Arnedo	(Hungary) Kornél Bardóczky (Hungary) Zoltán Nagy	2–6, 5–7
Loss	1–4	Jul 2001	Budapest, Hungary	Futures	Clay	(Chile) Sergio Elias	(Hungary) Kornél Bardóczky (Hungary) Zoltán Nagy	3–6, 6–3, 5–7
Loss	1–5	Sep 2001	Cheongju, South Korea	Futures	Clay	(Germany) Alexander Flock	(Argentina) Roberto Álvarez (France) Jordane Doble	4–6, 6–4, 2–6
Win	2–5	Oct 2001	Hong Kong	Futures	Hard	(Germany) Bernard Parun	(United States) Doug Bohaboy (United States) Alex Witt	6–4, 6–4
Loss	2–6	Nov 2001	Pattaya, Thailand	Futures	Hard	(Chinese Taipei) Lu Yen-hsun	(Indonesia) Peter Handoyo (South Africa) Raven Klasen	3–6, 2–6
Win	3–6	Nov 2001	Nonthaburi, Thailand	Futures	Hard	(Chinese Taipei) Lu Yen-hsun	(South Africa) Rik de Voest (South Africa) Johan du Randt	6–2, 6–4
Loss	3–7	Nov 2001	Hanoi, Vietnam	Futures	Hard	(Chinese Taipei) Lu Yen-hsun	(Israel) Lior Dahan (South Africa) Rik de Voest	w/o
Win	4–7	Jun 2002	Oberweier, Germany	Futures	Clay	(Germany) Martin Woisetschlager	(Germany) Markus Bayer (Germany) Philipp Gründler	w/o
Win	5–7	Jul 2002	Lisbon, Portugal	Futures	Clay	(Belgium) Jeroen Masson	(France) Jordane Doble (France) Sébastien Lami	7–6^{(7–5)}, 6–2
Loss	5–8	Sep 2002	El Menzah, Tunisia	Futures	Hard	(France) Benjamin Cassaigne	(Sweden) Henrik Andersson (Australia) Luke Bourgeois	6–7^{(5–7)}, 7–6^{(7–5)}, 6–7^{(5–7)}
Win	6–8	Sep 2002	Mulhouse, France	Futures	Hard	(Germany) Bernard Parun	(South Africa) Rik de Voest (South Africa) Dirk Stegmann	6–4, 6–7^{(5–7)}, 6–4
Win	7–8	Oct 2002	Forbach, France	Futures	Carpet (i)	(Germany) Bernard Parun	(France) Hervé Karcher (France) Julien Mathieu	6–1, 3–6, 6–1
Win	8–8	Apr 2003	Aguascalientes, Mexico	Futures	Clay	(Germany) Bernard Parun	(Brazil) Eduardo Bohrer (Brazil) Ronaldo Carvalho	4–6, 6–3, 7–6^{(7–1)}
Win	1–0	Jul 2003	Recanati, Italy	Challenger	Hard	(Italy) Manuel Jorquera	(France) Rodolphe Cadart (Israel) Dudi Sela	6–4, 7–5
Loss	8–9	Apr 2004	Doha, Qatar	Futures	Hard	(Germany) Bernard Parun	(Romania) Florin Mergea (Romania) Horia Tecău	1–6, 2–6
Loss	8–10	Jun 2004	Mishref, Kuwait	Futures	Hard	(Germany) Sebastian Fitz	(India) Rohan Bopanna (India) Mustafa Ghouse	6–4, 4–6, 3–6
Win	9–10	Jun 2004	Mishref, Kuwait	Futures	Hard	(Germany) Sebastian Fitz	(Georgia (country)) Gouram Kostava (Iran) Ramin Raziyani	3–6, 6–3, 6–2
Loss	1–1	Sep 2004	Tehran, Iran	Challenger	Clay	(France) Jean-Michel Pequery	(Austria) Oliver Marach (Switzerland) Jean-Claude Scherrer	0–6, 0–6
Loss	1–2	Oct 2004	Quito, Ecuador	Challenger	Clay	(Poland) Łukasz Kubot	(Mexico) Santiago González (Mexico) Alejandro Hernández	6–2, 2–6, 4–6
Loss	1–3	Nov 2004	Bogotá, Colombia	Challenger	Clay	(United Kingdom) Richard Barker	(Argentina) Sergio Roitman (Spain) Santiago Ventura	5–7, 4–6
Win	10–10	Jun 2005	Istanbul, Turkey	Futures	Hard	(Germany) Bernard Parun	(Russia) Konstantin Kravchuk (Russia) Alex Pavlioutchenkov	3–6, 7–6^{(7–2)}, 6–4
Loss	10–11	Oct 2005	Sarreguemines, France	Futures	Hard (i)	(Czech Republic) Radim Žitko	(France) Patrice Atias (France) Antoine Benneteau	6–2, 4–6, 3–6
Win	2–3	Nov 2005	Sunderland, United Kingdom	Challenger	Hard (i)	(Germany) Sebastian Rieschick	(Germany) Christopher Kas (Germany) Philipp Petzschner	6–4, 6–7^{(3–7)}, 6–4
Loss	10–12	Dec 2005	Chandigarh, India	Futures	Hard	(India) Vishal Uppal	(India) Karan Rastogi (India) Ashutosh Singh	6–7^{(5–7)}, 3–6
Loss	2–4	Mar 2006	Wolfsburg, Germany	Challenger	Carpet (i)	(Germany) Sebastian Rieschick	(Switzerland) Jean-Claude Scherrer (Italy) Uros Vico	6–7^{(3–7)}, 7–6^{(7–5)}, [8–10]
Loss	10–13	Mar 2006	Oberentfelden, Switzerland	Futures	Carpet (i)	(Italy) Giuseppe Menga	(Sweden) Carl-Henrik Hansen (Denmark) Frederik Nielsen	2–6, 5–7
Win	3–4	Jul 2006	Cuenca, Ecuador	Challenger	Clay	(Germany) Alexander Satschko	(Colombia) Santiago Giraldo (Colombia) Carlos Salamanca	3–6, 6–3, [10–6]
Loss	3–5	Jul 2006	Granby, Canada	Challenger	Hard	(Chinese Taipei) Lu Yen-hsun	(Canada) Alessandro Gravina (France) Gary Lugassy	2–6, 6–7^{(2–7)}
Loss	3–6	Aug 2006	Samarkand, Uzbekistan	Challenger	Clay	(South Korea) Woong-Sun Jun	(Japan) Satoshi Iwabuchi (Japan) Gouichi Motomura	6–2, 2–6, [5–10]
Loss	3–7	Oct 2006	Rennes, France	Challenger	Carpet (i)	(Poland) Tomasz Bednarek	(France) Grégory Carraz (France) Mathieu Montcourt	3–6, 6–3, [4–10]
Loss	10–14	Jan 2007	Nußloch, Germany	Futures	Carpet (i)	(Poland) Tomasz Bednarek	(Germany) Philipp Marx (Romania) Florin Mergea	3–6, 5–7
Win	4–7	Sep 2007	Orléans, France	Challenger	Hard (i)	(United States) James Cerretani	(Poland) Tomasz Bednarek (Poland) Michał Przysiężny	6–1, 7–6^{(7–2)}
Win	5–7	Nov 2007	Tunis, Tunisia	Challenger	Hard	(Bosnia and Herzegovina) Ivan Dodig	(Netherlands) Jasper Smit (Netherlands) Martijn van Haasteren	4–6, 7–5, [11–9]
Win	6–7	Jun 2008	Karlsruhe, Germany	Challenger	Clay	(Austria) Daniel Köllerer	(South Korea) Jun Woong-sun (Australia) Joseph Sirianni	6–2, 7–5
Loss	6–8	Jun 2008	Fürth, Germany	Challenger	Clay	(Austria) Daniel Köllerer	(Germany) Philipp Marx (Austria) Alexander Peya	3–6, 3–6
Win	7–8	Aug 2008	Istanbul, Turkey	Challenger	Hard	(Germany) Michael Kohlmann	(Czech Republic) David Škoch (Slovakia) Igor Zelenay	7–6^{(7–4)}, 6–4
Win	8–8	Aug 2008	Geneva, Switzerland	Challenger	Clay	(Austria) Daniel Köllerer	(Australia) Rameez Junaid (Germany) Philipp Marx	7–6^{(7–5)}, 3–6, [10–8]
Loss	8–9	Apr 2009	Napoli, Italy	Challenger	Clay	(Czech Republic) Lukáš Rosol	(Uruguay) Pablo Cuevas (Spain) David Marrero	4–6, 3–6
Loss	8–10	Apr 2010	Baton Rouge, United States	Challenger	Hard	(Australia) Chris Guccione	(Australia) Stephen Huss (Australia) Joseph Sirianni	6–1, 2–6, [11–13]
Win	9–10	Jul 2010	Oberstaufen, Germany	Challenger	Clay	(Czech Republic) Lukáš Rosol	(Chile) Hans Podlipnik Castillo (Austria) Max Raditschnigg	6–0, 7–5
Win	10–10	Sep 2010	Como, Italy	Challenger	Clay	(Czech Republic) David Škoch	(Germany) Martin Emmrich (Poland) Mateusz Kowalczyk	5–7, 7–6^{(7–2)}, [10–5]
Win	11–10	Sep 2010	İzmir, Turkey	Challenger	Hard	(Australia) Rameez Junaid	(United Kingdom) Jamie Delgado (United Kingdom) Jonathan Marray	6–2, 6–4
Win	12–10	Oct 2010	Seoul, South Korea	Challenger	Hard	(Australia) Rameez Junaid	(Canada) Vasek Pospisil (Canada) Adil Shamasdin	6–3, 6–4
Loss	12–11	Nov 2010	Salzburg, Austria	Challenger	Hard (i)	(Australia) Rameez Junaid	(Austria) Alexander Peya (Austria) Martin Slanar	6–7^{(1–7)}, 3–6
Loss	12–12	Jan 2011	Heilbronn, Germany	Challenger	Hard (i)	(Czech Republic) David Škoch	(United Kingdom) Jamie Delgado (United Kingdom) Jonathan Marray	1–6, 4–6
Win	13–12	Jun 2011	Fürth, Germany	Challenger	Clay	(Australia) Rameez Junaid	(Chile) Jorge Aguilar (Ecuador) Julio César Campozano	6–2, 6–7^{(2–7)}, [10–6]
Loss	13–13	Mar 2012	Barranquilla, Colombia	Challenger	Clay	(Uruguay) Marcel Felder	(United States) Nicholas Monroe (United States) Maciek Sykut	6–2, 3–6, [5–10]
Loss	13–14	Aug 2012	Aptos, United States	Challenger	Hard	(Australia) Chris Guccione	(South Africa) Rik de Voest (Australia) John Peers	7–6^{(7–5)}, 1–6, [4–10]
Loss	13–15	Oct 2012	Tashkent, Uzbekistan	Challenger	Hard	(Australia) Rameez Junaid	(Germany) Andre Begemann (Germany) Martin Emmrich	7–6^{(7–2)}, 6–7^{(2–7)}, [8–10]
Win	14–15	Aug 2013	Meerbusch, Germany	Challenger	Clay	(Australia) Rameez Junaid	(Germany) Dustin Brown (Germany) Philipp Marx	6–3, 7–6^{(7–4)}
Loss	14–16	Jun 2014	Milan, Italy	Challenger	Clay	(United States) James Cerretani	(Argentina) Guillermo Durán (Argentina) Máximo González	3–6, 3–6
Loss	14–17	Sep 2014	Genoa, Italy	Challenger	Clay	(Germany) Alexander Satschko	(Italy) Daniele Bracciali (Italy) Potito Starace	3–6, 4–6
Loss	14–18	Sep 2014	Biella, Italy	Challenger	Clay	(Germany) Alexander Satschko	(Italy) Marco Cecchinato (Italy) Matteo Viola	5–7, 0–6
Loss	14–19	Oct 2014	Tashkent, Uzbekistan	Challenger	Hard	(Germany) Alexander Satschko	(Slovenia) Lukáš Lacko (Croatia) Ante Pavić	3–6, 6–3, [11–13]
Loss	14–20	Mar 2015	Drummondville, Canada	Challenger	Hard (i)	(Canada) Frank Dancevic	(Canada) Philip Bester (Australia) Chris Guccione	4–6, 6–7^{(6–8)}
Win	15–20	Nov 2015	Andria, Italy	Challenger	Hard (i)	(Switzerland) Marco Chiudinelli	(Germany) Dustin Brown (Australia) Carsten Ball	7–6^{(7–5)}, 7–5
Loss	15–21	Jan 2016	Maui, United States	Challenger	Hard	(Australia) Alex Bolt	(Chinese Taipei) Jason Jung (United States) Dennis Novikov	3–6, 6–4, [8–10]

== Wins over No. 1 players ==
#	Partner	Opponents	Rank	Event	Surface	Rd	Score	Moser Rank
2011
1.	(Croatia) Ivo Karlović	(United States) Bob Bryan (United States) Mike Bryan	1; 1	US Open, New York, United States	Hard	1R	6–4, 2–6, 6–2	68
2012
2.	(Croatia) Ivo Karlović	(United States) Bob Bryan (United States) Mike Bryan	1; 1	Delray Beach, United States	Hard	QF	4–6, 6–4, [10–4]	62
