= Murad Inoyatov =

Uzbek tennis player (born 1984)

- Country (sports): Uzbekistan
- Residence: Tashkent, Uzbekistan
- Born: 13 November 1984 (age 40) Tashkent, Uzbek Soviet Socialist Republic
- Height: 1.80 m (5 ft 11 in)
- Plays: Right-handed
- Prize money: US$83,378

Singles
- Career record: 3–8
- Career titles: 0
- Highest ranking: No. 437 (May 11, 2009)

Doubles
- Career record: 3–6
- Career titles: 0
- Highest ranking: No. 172 (October 9, 2006)
Medal record
Representing Uzbekistan
Asian Games
Silver medal – second place	2010 Guangzhou	Team

Murad Inoyatov (born November 13, 1984) is a professional Uzbekistani tennis player.

Inoyatov reached his highest individual ranking on the ATP Tour on May 11, 2009, when he became World number 437. He primarily plays on the Futures circuit and the Challenger circuit.

Inoyatov has been a member of the Uzbekistani Davis Cup team since 2003, posting a 3–8 record in singles and a 3–5 record in doubles in fifteen ties played.

Inoyatov represented Uzbekistan at the 2006 and 2010 Asian Games, winning the silver medal in the Men's Team event at the 2010 Games.

== Satellite, Future and Challenger finals ==
=== Singles: 5 (3–2) ===
Legend (singles) ATP Challenger Tour (0–0) ITF Futures Tour (2–2) ITF Satellites (1–0)	Titles by surface Hard (3–1) Clay (0–1) Grass (0–0) Carpet (0–0)

Result	W–L	Date	Tournament	Tier	Surface	Opponent	Score
Win	1–0	Mar 2006	New Delhi, India	Satellite	Hard	(Italy) Federico Torresi	6–1, 7–6^{(7–3)}
Loss	1–1	Jun 2008	Iran F2, Tehran	Futures	Clay	(Slovakia) Ján Stančík	1–6, 6–2, 3–6
Win	2–1	Jul 2008	Kazakhstan F1, Astana	Futures	Hard	(South Korea) Park Seung-kyu	6–1, 1–6, 6–4
Loss	2–2	Apr 2009	Uzbekistan F1, Andijan	Futures	Hard	(Czech Republic) Jan Minář	6–3, 6–7^{(3–7)}, 3–6
Win	3–2	May 2010	India F4, Kolkata	Futures	Hard	(India) Karan Rastogi	6–4, 6–4

=== Doubles 25 (12–13) ===
Legend (doubles) ATP Challenger Tour (4–1) ITF Futures Tour (7–10) ITF Satellites (1–2)	Titles by surface Hard (9–10) Clay (3–3) Grass (0–0) Carpet (0–0)

Result	W–L	Date	Tournament	Tier	Surface	Partner	Opponents	Score
Loss	0–1	Aug 2004	Iran F1, Tehran	Futures	Clay	(Uzbekistan) Sarvar Ikramov	(Monaco) Benjamin Balleret (France) Clément Morel	1–6, 1–6
Win	1–1	Nov 2004	China F2, Guangzhou	Futures	Hard	(Uzbekistan) Denis Istomin	(Italy) Flavio Cipolla (Italy) Alessandro Motti	3–0 ret.
Loss	1–2	Apr 2005	Uzbekistan F1, Qarshi	Futures	Hard	(Uzbekistan) Denis Istomin	(Russia) Sergei Demekhine (Russia) Igor Kunitsyn	4–6, 7–5, 4–6
Win	2–2	May 2005	Fergana, Uzbekistan	Challenger	Hard	(Uzbekistan) Denis Istomin	(Chinese Taipei) Lu Yen-hsun (Thailand) Danai Udomchoke	6–1, 6–3
Loss	2–3	Feb 2006	New Delhi, India	Satellite	Hard	(Kazakhstan) Alexey Kedryuk	(South Korea) Kwon Hyung-tae (South Korea) Nam Hyun-woo	4–6, 6–2, 4–6
Win	3–3	Mar 2006	New Delhi, India	Satellite	Hard	(Kazakhstan) Alexey Kedryuk	(India) Vijay Kannan (India) Ashutosh Singh	6–4, 6–2
Loss	3–4	Mar 2006	New Delhi, India	Satellite	Hard	(Kazakhstan) Alexey Kedryuk	(India) Vijay Kannan (India) Ashutosh Singh	3–6, 7–6^{(8–6)}, 1–6
Win	4–4	Apr 2006	Uzbekistan F1, Qarshi	Futures	Hard	(Uzbekistan) Denis Istomin	(Romania) Teodor-Dacian Crăciun (Czech Republic) Roman Vögeli	6–4, 6–1
Loss	4–5	May 2006	Uzbekistan F4, Andijan	Futures	Hard	(Russia) Mikhail Elgin	(India) Sunil-Kumar Sipaeya (Russia) Dmitri Sitak	3–6, 4–6
Win	5–5	Jul 2006	Turkey F3, Yeşilyurt	Futures	Hard	(Kazakhstan) Alexey Kedryuk	(France) Julien Maes (France) Alexandre Renard	7–5, 6–4
Win	6–5	Jul 2006	Penza, Russia	Challenger	Hard	(Uzbekistan) Denis Istomin	(Russia) Denis Matsukevich (Russia) Artem Sitak	6–1, 6–3
Win	7–5	Aug 2006	St. Petersburg, Russia	Challenger	Clay	(Uzbekistan) Denis Istomin	(France) David Guez (France) Édouard Roger-Vasselin	4–6, 6–4, [10–5]
Loss	7–6	Mar 2007	Portugal F2, Lagos	Futures	Hard	(Russia) Dmitri Sitak	(Belgium) Niels Desein (Canada) Pierre-Ludovic Duclos	3–6, 4–6
Loss	7–7	May 2007	Uzbekistan F1, Andijan	Futures	Hard	(Uzbekistan) Denis Istomin	(Russia) Pavel Chekhov (Russia) Victor Kozin	6–7^{(5–7)}, 7–6^{(7–4)}, 3–6
Loss	7–8	Jul 2007	Penza, Russia	Challenger	Hard	(Uzbekistan) Denis Istomin	(Russia) Alexandre Krasnoroutskiy (Russia) Alexander Kudryavtsev	1–6, 6–4, [4–10]
Win	8–8	Oct 2007	France F19, Rodez	Futures	Hard (i)	(Serbia) Vladimir Obradović	(Estonia) Mait Künnap (Germany) Daniel Stöhr	6–3, 6–3
Loss	8–9	May 2008	Uzbekistan F1, Andijan	Futures	Hard	(Russia) Dmitri Sitak	(Russia) Alexandre Krasnoroutskiy (Russia) Andrey Kumantsov	3–6, 3–6
Loss	8–10	Jun 2008	Iran F2, Tehran	Futures	Clay	(India) Rohan Gajjar	(Kazakhstan) Alexey Kedryuk (Egypt) Mohamed Mamoun	0–6, 6–7^{(3–7)}
Win	9–10	Jul 2008	Kazakhstan F1, Astana	Futures	Clay	(Kazakhstan) Alexey Kedryuk	(Ukraine) Aleksandr Agafonov (Ukraine) Dmytro Petrov	7–6^{(13–11)}, 6–4
Loss	9–11	Apr 2009	Uzbekistan F1, Andijan	Futures	Hard	(Ukraine) Ivan Anikanov	(Belarus) Andrei Karatchenia (Belarus) Dzmitry Zhyrmont	7–6^{(7–3)}, 4–6, [4–10]
Loss	9–12	Aug 2009	Iran F5, Tehran	Futures	Clay	(Russia) Alexei Filenkov	(Indonesia) Christopher Rungkat (Indonesia) Sunu Wahyu Trijati	2–6, 0–6
Win	10–12	Aug 2009	Iran F6, Tehran	Futures	Clay	(Russia) Stepan Khotulev	(Greece) Paris Gemouchidis (Romania) Bogdan-Victor Leonte	6–3, 6–1
Win	11–12	Oct 2009	Tashkent, Uzbekistan	Challenger	Hard	(Uzbekistan) Denis Istomin	(Czech Republic) Jiří Krkoška (Slovakia) Lukáš Lacko	7–6^{(7–4)}, 6–4
Loss	11–13	May 2010	India F4, Kolkata	Futures	Hard	(India) Yannick Nelord	(India) Vivek Shokeen (India) Ashutosh Singh	4–6, 6–7^{(3–7)}
Win	12–13	Sep 2010	Iran F3, Tehran	Futures	Clay	(Ukraine) Ivan Anikanov	(Russia) Alexander Lobkov (Russia) Alexander Rumyantsev	6–3, 6–4
