= Sarvar Ikramov =

Uzbek tennis player (born 1985)

- Country (sports): Uzbekistan
- Born: 10 January 1985 (age 41) Tashkent, Uzbekistan
- Height: 5 ft 11 in (180 cm)
- Plays: Right-handed
- Prize money: $59,005

Singles
- Highest ranking: No. 535 (17 September 2012)

Doubles
- Career record: 0–1 (ATP Tour)
- Highest ranking: No. 636 (30 August 2010)

Sarvar Ikramov (born 10 January 1985) is an Uzbekistani former professional tennis player.

Born in Tashkent, Ikramov made an ATP Tour main draw appearance at the 2002 President's Cup in his birth city.

Ikramov made his Davis Cup debut in 2004 and represented Uzbekistan at the 2006 Asian Games.

During his Davis Cup career he featured in a total of eight ties, the last in 2013. He won three singles rubbers, with his best win coming against China's Zhang Ze.
