= Jurabek Karimov =

Uzbekistani tennis player (born 1998)

Jurabek Karimov Джурабек Каримов
- Country (sports): Uzbekistan
- Residence: Tashkent, Uzbekistan
- Born: 4 June 1998 (age 28) Tashkent, Uzbekistan
- Height: 1.93 m (6 ft 4 in)
- Plays: Right-handed (two handed-backhand)
- College: Wake Forest University
- Coach: Petr Lebed, Sergey Arkashn
- Prize money: $62,222

Singles
- Career record: 2–1
- Career titles: 0
- Highest ranking: No. 426 (27 August 2018)

Grand Slam singles results
- Australian Open Junior: F (2016)
- French Open Junior: 3R (2015, 2016)
- Wimbledon Junior: QF (2016)
- US Open Junior: 1R (2015)

Doubles
- Career record: 1–0
- Career titles: 0
- Highest ranking: No. 279 (15 April 2019)

Grand Slam doubles results
- Australian Open Junior: 2R (2015)
- French Open Junior: QF (2016)
- Wimbledon Junior: 2R (2016)
- US Open Junior: 2R (2015)

Team competitions
- Davis Cup: 4–1

Jurabek Karimov (Uzbek: Журабек Каримов, Jo'rabek Karimov; born 4 June 1998) is an inactive Uzbekistani tennis player.

Karimov has a career high ATP singles ranking of No. 426 achieved on 27 August 2018 and a doubles ranking of No. 279 achieved on 5 April 2019.

Karimov has represented Uzbekistan in Davis Cup, where he has a win–loss record of 4–1. He achieved his first victory in 2018 against British player Cameron Norrie after coming from two sets down.

== Personal life ==
Karimov began playing tennis aged 7. His great-uncle Islam Karimov was the first president of Uzbekistan.

== Style of play ==
Jurabek Karimov has a double handed backhand. He is very agile and athletic.

== Junior Grand Slam finals ==
=== Singles ===
Result	Year	Tournament	Surface	Opponent	Score
Loss	2016	Australian Open	Hard	(Australia) Oliver Anderson	2–6, 6–1, 1–6

== Future and Challenger finals ==
=== Singles: 7 (3–4) ===
Legend
ATP Challengers 0 (0–0)
ITF Futures/World Tennis Tour 7 (3–4)

Outcome	No.	Date	Tournament	Surface	Opponent	Score
Runner-up	1.	April 9, 2016	Qarshi, Uzbekistan F1	Hard	(Belarus) Ilya Ivashka	3–6, 6–1, 1–6
Winner	2.	October 22, 2017	Kuching, Malaysia F1	Hard	(United States) Evan Song	7–6^{(7–5)}, 6–2
Runner-up	3.	October 29, 2017	Kuala Lumpur, Malaysia F2	Hard	(Netherlands) Scott Griekspoor	3–6, 2–6
Runner-up	4.	March 17, 2018	Kazan, Russia F3	Hard (i)	(Russia) Roman Safiullin	2–6, 1–6
Winner	5.	August 11, 2018	Minsk, Belarus F1	Hard	(United Kingdom) Jonathan Gray	6–4, 6–4
Runner-up	6.	July 21, 2019	M15 Telavi, Georgia	Clay	(Czech Republic) David Poljak	4–6, 1–6
Winner	7.	September 29, 2019	M25 Almaty, Kazakhstan	Hard	(Kazakhstan) Beibit Zhukayev	7–5, 6–3

=== Doubles 9 (3–6) ===
Legend
ATP Challengers 3 (1–2)
ITF Futures/World Tennis Tour 6 (2–4)

Outcome	No.	Date	Tournament	Surface	Partner	Opponents	Score
Runner-up	1.	June 13, 2015	Namangan, Uzbekistan F4	Hard	(Uzbekistan) Sanjar Fayziev	(South Africa) Dean O'Brien (South Africa) Ruan Roelofse	5–7, 4–6
Runner-up	2.	August 2, 2015	Astana, Kazakhstan	Hard	(South Korea) Chung Yun-seong	(Russia) Konstantin Kravchuk (Ukraine) Denys Molchanov	2–6, 2–6
Runner-up	3.	April 9, 2016	Qarshi, Uzbekistan F1	Hard	(Uzbekistan) Sanjar Fayziev	(Chinese Taipei) Chen Ti (India) Sumit Nagal	5–5, RET
Runner-up	4.	September 24, 2016	Shymkent, Kazakhstan F5	Clay	(Kazakhstan) Roman Khassanov	(Russia) Mikhail Fufygin (Estonia) Vladimir Ivanov	5–7, 2–6
Winner	5.	October 29, 2017	Kuala Lumpur, Malaysia F2	Hard	(China) Wang Aoran	(Guatemala) Wilfredo González (Italy) Francesco Vilardo	6–4, 6–1
Winner	6.	November 5, 2017	Kuala Lumpur, Malaysia F3	Hard	(China) Wang Aoran	(Japan) Yuichi Ito (Thailand) Nuttanon Kadchapanan	7–6^{(7–5)}, 6–4
Runner-up	7.	May 12, 2018	Qarshi, Uzbekistan	Hard	(Uzbekistan) Sanjar Fayziev	(Kazakhstan) Timur Khabibulin (Ukraine) Vladyslav Manafov	2–6, 1–6
Winner	8.	October 13, 2018	Tashkent, Uzbekistan	Hard	(Uzbekistan) Sanjar Fayziev	(Italy) Federico Gaio (Spain) Enrique López Pérez	6–2, 6–7^{(3–7)}, [11–9]
Runner-up	9.	September 1, 2019	M25 Irpin, Ukraine	Clay	(Uzbekistan) Sergey Fomin	(Ukraine) Vladyslav Manafov (Kazakhstan) Denis Yevseyev	6–7^{(5–7)}, 7–5, [6–10]
Runner-up	10.	January 26, 2020	M15 Kazan, Russia	Hard (i)	(Uzbekistan) Sergey Fomin	(Russia) Alexander Igoshin (Russia) Evgenii Tiurnev	6–7^{(6–8)}, 4–6

== Davis Cup ==
=== Participations: (4–1) ===
Group membership World Group (0–0) WG Play-off (1–1) Group I (3–0) Group II (0–0) Group III (0–0) Group IV (0–0)	Matches by surface Hard (1–0) Clay (2–1) Grass (1–0) Carpet (0–0)	Matches by type Singles (2–1) Doubles (2–0)

- ▲ ▼ indicates the outcome of the Davis Cup match followed by the score, date, place of event, the zonal classification and its phase, and the court surface.

Rubber outcome	No.	Rubber	Match type (partner if any)	Opponent nation	Opponent player(s)	Score
▼2–3; 16–18 September 2016; Olympic Tennis School, Tashkent, Uzbekistan; World Group Play-off; Clay surface
Defeat	1	V	Singles	Switzerland	Antoine Bellier	2–6, 4–6, 7–6^{(8–6)}, 3–6
▲4–1; 6–7 April 2018; Naval Sports Complex, Islamabad, Pakistan; Asia/Oceania Second round; Grass surface
Victory	2	III	Doubles (with Denis Istomin)	Pakistan	Aqeel Khan / Aisam-ul-Haq Qureshi	6–2, 6–4
▼1–3; 14–16 September 2018; Emirates Arena, Glasgow, Great Britain; World Group Play-off; Hard (indoor) surface
Victory	3	II	Singles	(United Kingdom) Great Britain	Cameron Norrie	0–6, 5–7, 7–6^{(8–6)}, 6–2, 6–2
▲3–2; 13-14 September 2019; Automobile and Touring Club of Lebanon, Jounieh, Lebanon; Asia/Oceania Group I First round; Clay surface
Victory	4	III	Doubles (with Sanjar Fayziev)	Lebanon	Benjamin Hassan / Giovani Samaha	6–2, 5–7, 6–3
Victory	5	V	Singles	Lebanon	Hady Habib	6–4, 1–6, 6–1
