= Tashkent Challenger =

Defunct tennis tournament
- Location: Tashkent; Uzbekistan
- Venue: Olympic Tennis School
- Category: ATP Challenger Tour
- Surface: Hard / Outdoors
- Draw: 32S/16Q/16D
- Prize money: $125,000+H
- Website: Website

The Tashkent Challenger was a tennis tournament held in Tashkent, Uzbekistan from 2008 until 2018. It was part of the Association of Tennis Professionals (ATP) Challenger Tour and was played on outdoor hardcourts.

Between 1997 and 2002, there was a tournament at a level equivalent to the ATP 250 series, played in Tashkent, the Tashkent Open.

== Past finals ==
=== Singles ===
Year	Champion	Runner-up	Score
2018	(Canada) Félix Auger-Aliassime	(Poland) Kamil Majchrzak	6–3, 6–2
2017	(Spain) Guillermo García López	(Poland) Kamil Majchrzak	6–1, 7–6^{(7–1)}
2016	(Russia) Konstantin Kravchuk	(Uzbekistan) Denis Istomin	7–5, 6–4
2015	(Uzbekistan) Denis Istomin	(Slovakia) Lukáš Lacko	6–3, 6–4
2014	(Slovakia) Lukáš Lacko	(Ukraine) Sergiy Stakhovsky	6–2, 6–3
2013	(Israel) Dudi Sela	(Russia) Teymuraz Gabashvili	6–1, 6–2
2012	(Belarus) Uladzimir Ignatik	(Slovakia) Lukáš Lacko	6–3, 7–6^{(7–3)}
2011	(Uzbekistan) Denis Istomin	(Estonia) Jürgen Zopp	6–4, 6–3
2010	(Slovakia) Karol Beck	(Luxembourg) Gilles Müller	6–7^{(4–7)}, 6–4, 7–5
2009	(Cyprus) Marcos Baghdatis	(Uzbekistan) Denis Istomin	6–3, 1–6, 6–3
2008	(Chinese Taipei) Lu Yen-hsun	(France) Mathieu Montcourt	6–3, 6–2

=== Doubles ===
Year	Champion	Runner-up	Score
2018	(Uzbekistan) Sanjar Fayziev (Uzbekistan) Jurabek Karimov	(Italy) Federico Gaio (Spain) Enrique López Pérez	6–2, 6–7^{(3–7)}, [11–9]
2017	(Chile) Hans Podlipnik-Castillo (Belarus) Andrei Vasilevski	(India) Yuki Bhambri (India) Divij Sharan	6–4, 6–2
2016	(Russia) Mikhail Elgin (Uzbekistan) Denis Istomin	(Germany) Andre Begemann (India) Leander Paes	6–4, 6–2
2015	(Belarus) Sergey Betov (Russia) Mikhail Elgin	(Germany) Andre Begemann (New Zealand) Artem Sitak	6–4, 6–4
2014	(Slovakia) Lukáš Lacko (Croatia) Ante Pavić	(Germany) Frank Moser (Germany) Alexander Satschko	6–3, 3–6, [13–11]
2013	(Russia) Mikhail Elgin (Russia) Teymuraz Gabashvili	(India) Purav Raja (India) Divij Sharan	6–4, 6–4
2012	(Germany) Andre Begemann (Germany) Martin Emmrich	(Australia) Rameez Junaid (Germany) Frank Moser	6–7^{(2–7)}, 7–6^{(7–2)}, [10–8]
2011	(Finland) Harri Heliövaara (Ukraine) Denys Molchanov	(United States) John Paul Fruttero (South Africa) Raven Klaasen	7–6^{(7–5)}, 7–6^{(7–3)}
2010	(United Kingdom) Ross Hutchins (United Kingdom) Jamie Murray	(Slovakia) Karol Beck (Slovakia) Filip Polášek	2–6, 6–4, [10–8]
2009	(Uzbekistan) Murad Inoyatov (Uzbekistan) Denis Istomin	(Czech Republic) Jiří Krkoška (Slovakia) Lukáš Lacko	7–6^{(7–4)}, 6–4
2008	(Italy) Flavio Cipolla (Czech Republic) Pavel Šnobel	(Russia) Michail Elgin (Russia) Alexandre Kudryavtsev	6–3, 6–4
