= 2010 Karshi Challenger – Singles =

Singles
- 2010 Karshi Challenger

Final
- Champion: (Slovenia) Blaž Kavčič
- Runner-up: (New Zealand) Michael Venus
- Score: 7–6(6), 7–6(5)

Events
Singles	Doubles
← 2009 ·	Karshi Challenger	· 2011 →

Rainer Eitzinger was the champion in 2009, but he decided to not compete this year.
Blaž Kavčič won the final against Michael Venus 7–6(6), 7–6(5).

== Seeds ==
1. (Slovenia) Blaž Kavčič (champion)
2. (Russia) Konstantin Kravchuk (second round)
3. (Slovakia) Andrej Martin (second round)
4. (Slovakia) Marek Semjan (quarterfinals)
5. (Russia) Andrey Kumantsov (second round)
6. (Latvia) Andis Juška (second round, retired due to stomachache)
7. (Czech Republic) Jan Minář (quarterfinals)
8. (Spain) Carles Poch Gradin (quarterfinals)

== Draw ==
=== Key ===
- Q = Qualifier
- WC = Wild card
- LL = Lucky loser
- Alt = Alternate
- SE = Special exempt
- PR = Protected ranking
- ITF = ITF entry
- JE = Junior exempt
- w/o = Walkover
- r = Retired
- d = Defaulted
- SR = Special ranking

=== Finals ===
Semifinals
1	(Slovenia) Blaž Kavčič	6	7
Q	(India) Vishnu Vardhan	3	6^{5}
(Chinese Taipei) Yang Tsung-hua	4	3
Q	(New Zealand) Michael Venus	6	6

Final
1	(Slovenia) Blaž Kavčič	7	7
Q	(New Zealand) Michael Venus	6^{6}	6^{5}

=== Top half ===
First round
1	(Slovenia) B Kavčič	7	6
Q	(Australia) S Groth	6^{3}	3
(China) Z Zhang	3
(Russia) M Ledovskikh	0	r
(Russia) V Rudnev	6	7
WC	(Uzbekistan) V Uzakov	3	5
WC	(Uzbekistan) T Ismailov	2	2
8	(Spain) C Poch-Gradin	6	6
4	(Slovakia) M Semjan	6	6
WC	(Uzbekistan) M Inoyatov	4	1
(Israel) A Weintraub	6	6
(Russia) M Elgin	3	4
Q	(India) V Vardhan	6	6
(Japan) H Moriya	1	4
(Germany) D Blömke	6	3	3
5	(Russia) A Kumantsov	4	6	6

Second round
1	(Slovenia) B Kavčič	6	6
(China) Z Zhang	3	3
(Russia) V Rudnev	3	3
8	(Spain) C Poch-Gradin	6	6
4	(Slovakia) M Semjan	6	2
(Israel) A Weintraub	0	1	r
Q	(India) V Vardhan	4	6	6
5	(Russia) A Kumantsov	6	4	3

Quarterfinals
1	(Slovenia) B Kavčič	3	6	6
8	(Spain) C Poch-Gradin	6	3	2
4	(Slovakia) M Semjan	7	3	6^{8}
Q	(India) V Vardhan	5	6	7

Semifinals
1	(Slovenia) B Kavčič	6	7
Q	(India) V Vardhan	3	6^{5}

=== Bottom half ===
First round
6	(Latvia) A Juška	6	7
WC	(Uzbekistan) A Saidmukhamedov	3	5
Q	(Ukraine) A Smirnov	6^{4}	6	3
(Slovakia) M Mečíř Jr.	7	4	6
(Chinese Taipei) T-h Yang	6	6
(Argentina) J-M Valverde	3	0
(France) L Walter	6	3	2
3	(Slovakia) A Martin	3	6	6
7	(Czech Republic) J Minář	6	6
(South Korea) W-s Jun	1	4
(Lithuania) L Grigelis	3	4
(New Zealand) J Statham	6	6
(Serbia) B Pašanski	3	7	4
Q	(New Zealand) M Venus	6	6^{3}	6
(Estonia) J Zopp	3	3
2	(Russia) K Kravchuk	6	6

Second round
6	(Latvia) A Juška	2	r
(Slovakia) M Mečíř Jr.	4
(Chinese Taipei) T-h Yang	6	3	6
3	(Slovakia) A Martin	2	6	1
7	(Czech Republic) J Minář	6	2	6
(New Zealand) J Statham	3	6	4
Q	(New Zealand) M Venus	6	7
2	(Russia) K Kravchuk	1	6^{5}

Quarterfinals
(Slovakia) M Mečíř Jr.	3	4
(Chinese Taipei) T-h Yang	6	6
7	(Czech Republic) J Minář	7	5	6^{1}
Q	(New Zealand) M Venus	6^{9}	7	7

Semifinals
(Chinese Taipei) T-h Yang	4	3
Q	(New Zealand) M Venus	6	6
