= 2013 Karshi Challenger – Singles =

Singles
- 2013 Karshi Challenger

Final
- Champion: (Russia) Teymuraz Gabashvili
- Runner-up: (Moldova) Radu Albot
- Score: 6–4, 6–4

Events
Singles	Doubles
← 2012 ·	Karshi Challenger	· 2014 →

Igor Kunitsyn was the defending champion, but chose not to participate.
Teymuraz Gabashvili defeated Radu Albot 6–4, 6–4 in the final to win the title.

== Seeds ==
1. (Russia) Teymuraz Gabashvili (champion)
2. (Israel) Amir Weintraub (second round)
3. (Russia) Konstantin Kravchuk (quarterfinals)
4. (Ukraine) Oleksandr Nedovyesov (quarterfinals)
5. (Czech Republic) Jan Mertl (quarterfinals)
6. (Chinese Taipei) Chen Ti (semifinals)
7. (Moldova) Radu Albot (final)
8. (Belarus) Dzmitry Zhyrmont (first round)

== Draw ==
=== Key ===
- Q = Qualifier
- WC = Wild card
- LL = Lucky loser
- Alt = Alternate
- SE = Special exempt
- PR = Protected ranking
- ITF = ITF entry
- JE = Junior exempt
- w/o = Walkover
- r = Retired
- d = Defaulted
- SR = Special ranking

=== Finals ===
Semifinals
1	(Russia) Teymuraz Gabashvili	6	6
6	(Chinese Taipei) Chen Ti	2	4
7	(Moldova) Radu Albot	6	3
(India) Prakash Amritraj	1	0^{r}

Final
1	(Russia) Teymuraz Gabashvili	6	6
7	(Moldova) Radu Albot	4	4

=== Top half ===
First round
1	(Russia) T Gabashvili	6	6
WC	(Uzbekistan) S Fayziev	2	2
WC	(Uzbekistan) T Ismailov	7^{8}	6
(Spain) G Olaso	6^{6}	4
(Croatia) D Marcan	6^{2}	5
Q	(Belarus) A Bury	7^{7}	7
Q	(Russia) A Vatutin	5	1
5	(Czech Republic) J Mertl	7	6
4	(Ukraine) O Nedovyesov	6	6
WC	(Uzbekistan) S Ikramov	2	0
(Portugal) R Machado	3	3
(Slovakia) Adrian Sikora	6	6
(Croatia) T Androić	4	6	6^{3}
(South Korea) S-y Jeong	6	3	7^{7}
Q	(Belarus) E Gerasimov	4	6	3
6	(Chinese Taipei) T Chen	6	0	6

Second round
1	(Russia) T Gabashvili	6	6
WC	(Uzbekistan) T Ismailov	0	1
Q	(Belarus) A Bury	6^{4}	5
5	(Czech Republic) J Mertl	7^{7}	7
4	(Ukraine) O Nedovyesov	6	6
(Slovakia) A Sikora	4	3
(South Korea) S-y Jeong	5	1
6	(Chinese Taipei) T Chen	7	6

Quarterfinals
1	(Russia) T Gabashvili	7	6
5	(Czech Republic) J Mertl	5	1
4	(Ukraine) O Nedovyesov	6^{8}	3
6	(Chinese Taipei) T Chen	7^{10}	6

Semifinals
1	(Russia) T Gabashvili	6	6
6	(Chinese Taipei) T Chen	2	4

=== Bottom half ===
First round
7	(Moldova) R Albot	6	6
(Russia) Alexander Lobkov	2	3
(Russia) A Kudryavtsev	6^{15}	4
(New Zealand) M Venus	7^{17}	6
(Serbia) F Krajinović	6	6^{3}	6
(France) L Pouille	3	7^{7}	3
(India) V Vardhan	2	1
3	(Russia) K Kravchuk	6	6
8	(Belarus) D Zhyrmont	4	6	6^{3}
Q	(Uzbekistan) V Uzakov	6	3	7^{7}
(Russia) D Matsukevich	6	7^{7}
WC	(Uzbekistan) Nigmat Shofayziev	1	6^{5}
(France) Antoine Benneteau	6	5	1
(India) P Amritraj	4	7	6
(Belarus) A Vasilevski	1	4
2	(Israel) A Weintraub	6	6

Second round
7	(Moldova) R Albot	6	6
(New Zealand) M Venus	4	4
(Serbia) F Krajinović	1	7^{9}	3
3	(Russia) K Kravchuk	6	6^{7}	6
Q	(Uzbekistan) V Uzakov	7^{7}	2	0
(Russia) D Matsukevich	6^{3}	6	6
(India) P Amritraj	6	5	6
2	(Israel) A Weintraub	4	7	2

Quarterfinals
7	(Moldova) R Albot	6	5	6
3	(Russia) K Kravchuk	2	7	2
(Russia) D Matsukevich	6^{6}	3
(India) P Amritraj	7^{8}	6

Semifinals
7	(Moldova) R Albot	6	3
(India) P Amritraj	1	0^{r}
