= 2014 Karshi Challenger – Singles =

Singles
- 2014 Karshi Challenger

Final
- Champion: (Georgia (country)) Nikoloz Basilashvili
- Runner-up: (United States) Chase Buchanan
- Score: 7–6^{(7–2)}, 6–2

Events
Singles	Doubles
← 2013 ·	Karshi Challenger	· 2015 →

Teymuraz Gabashvili was the defending champion, but decided not to compete.

Nikoloz Basilashvili won the title, defeating Chase Buchanan in the final, 7–6^{(7–2)}, 6–2.

== Seeds ==
1. (Russia) Alexander Kudryavtsev (quarterfinals)
2. (Canada) Filip Peliwo (first round, retired)
3. (Russia) Konstantin Kravchuk (second round)
4. (Japan) Yasutaka Uchiyama (quarterfinals)
5. (United States) Chase Buchanan (final)
6. (Chinese Taipei) Huang Liang-chi (first round)
7. (Japan) Shuichi Sekiguchi (first round)
8. (Serbia) Peđa Krstin (first round)

== Draw ==
=== Key ===
- Q = Qualifier
- WC = Wild card
- LL = Lucky loser
- Alt = Alternate
- SE = Special exempt
- PR = Protected ranking
- ITF = ITF entry
- JE = Junior exempt
- w/o = Walkover
- r = Retired
- d = Defaulted
- SR = Special ranking

=== Finals ===
Semifinals
5	(United States) Chase Buchanan	6	6
(India) Jeevan Nedunchezhiyan	4	4
(Russia) Aslan Karatsev	3	3
(Georgia (country)) Nikoloz Basilashvili	6	6

Final
5	(United States) Chase Buchanan	6^{2}	2
(Georgia (country)) Nikoloz Basilashvili	7^{7}	6

=== Top half ===
First round
1	(Russia) A Kudryavtsev	7^{7}	6
WC	(Russia) Karen Khachanov	6^{3}	4
Q	(Ukraine) D Molchanov	6	6
WC	(Uzbekistan) Shonigmatjon Shofayziyev	3	3
(Slovakia) Adrian Sikora	2	1
Q	(Russia) A Zaitsev	6	6
WC	(Uzbekistan) S Fayziev	4	3
5	(United States) C Buchanan	6	6
3	(Russia) K Kravchuk	6	6^{3}	6
(Russia) V Rudnev	2	7^{7}	2
(India) J Nedunchezhiyan	7	6
(Belarus) D Zhyrmont	5	1
(Bosnia and Herzegovina) A Šetkić	6	6
(Czech Republic) Michal Konecny	3	4
Q	(Russia) M Ledovskikh	7^{7}	6
8	(Serbia) P Krstin	6^{3}	3

Second round
1	(Russia) A Kudryavtsev	6	3
Q	(Ukraine) D Molchanov	2	1^{r}
Q	(Russia) A Zaitsev	1	6^{4}
5	(United States) C Buchanan	6	7^{7}
3	(Russia) K Kravchuk	3	6	4
(India) J Nedunchezhiyan	6	2	6
(Bosnia and Herzegovina) A Šetkić	5	6	6^{6}
Q	(Russia) M Ledovskikh	7	4	7^{8}

Quarterfinals
1	(Russia) A Kudryavtsev	3	6^{1}
5	(United States) C Buchanan	6	7^{7}
(India) J Nedunchezhiyan	6	6
Q	(Russia) M Ledovskikh	3	2

Semifinals
5	(United States) C Buchanan	6	6
(India) J Nedunchezhiyan	4	4

=== Bottom half ===
First round
6	(Chinese Taipei) L-c Huang	6^{7}	6	2
(Russia) A Karatsev	7^{9}	3	6
(Russia) Alexander Lobkov	6	6^{8}	4
WC	(Uzbekistan) T Ismailov	4	7^{10}	6
(Netherlands) B Westerhof	6	6
(India) S Balaji	3	4
(Austria) Marc Rath	6^{4}	1
4	(Japan) Y Uchiyama	7^{7}	6
7	(Japan) Shuichi Sekiguchi	1	4
(Georgia (country)) N Basilashvili	6	6
(Chinese Taipei) T Chen	7	6
Q	(France) Laurent Rochette	5	1
(Ukraine) A Smirnov	6^{1}	6^{5}
(India) S Myneni	7^{7}	7^{7}
(Netherlands) A van der Duim	3
2	(Canada) F Peliwo	1^{r}

Second round
(Russia) A Karatsev	7	6^{3}	6
WC	(Uzbekistan) T Ismailov	5	7^{7}	3
(Netherlands) B Westerhof	4	6^{4}
4	(Japan) Y Uchiyama	6	7^{7}
(Georgia (country)) N Basilashvili	3	7^{7}	6
(Chinese Taipei) T Chen	6	6^{4}	4
(India) S Myneni	7^{7}	6
(Netherlands) A van der Duim	6^{4}	2

Quarterfinals
(Russia) A Karatsev	6	3	6
4	(Japan) Y Uchiyama	4	6	'4
(Georgia (country)) N Basilashvili	6	6
(India) S Myneni	1	2

Semifinals
(Russia) A Karatsev	3	3
(Georgia (country)) N Basilashvili	6	6
