= 2016 Karshi Challenger – Doubles =

Doubles
- 2016 Karshi Challenger

Final
- Champion: (Spain) Enrique López-Pérez (India) Jeevan Nedunchezhiyan
- Runner-up: (Georgia (country)) Aleksandre Metreveli (Kazakhstan) Dmitry Popko
- Score: 6–1, 6–4

Events
Singles	Doubles
← 2015 ·	Karshi Challenger	· 2017 →

Yuki Bhambri and Adrián Menéndez-Maceiras were the defending champions but chose not to participate.

Enrique López-Pérez and Jeevan Nedunchezhiyan won the title after defeating Aleksandre Metreveli and Dmitry Popko 6–1, 6–4 in the final.

== Seeds ==
1. (Belarus) Sergey Betov / (Russia) Mikhail Elgin (quarterfinals)
2. (South Africa) Dean O'Brien / (South Africa) Ruan Roelofse (first round)
3. (Colombia) Nicolás Barrientos / (Uruguay) Ariel Behar (semifinals)
4. (Ukraine) Denys Molchanov / (Kazakhstan) Aleksandr Nedovyesov (semifinals)

== Draw ==
=== Key ===
- Q = Qualifier
- WC = Wild card
- LL = Lucky loser
- Alt = Alternate
- SE = Special exempt
- PR = Protected ranking
- ITF = ITF entry
- JE = Junior exempt
- w/o = Walkover
- r = Retired
- d = Defaulted
- SR = Special ranking

First round
1	(Belarus) S Betov (Russia) M Elgin	7	6
(Moldova) R Albot (Belarus) M Dubarenco	5	3
(Serbia) N Milojević (Serbia) M Tepavac	6	2	[8]
(Georgia (country)) A Metreveli (Kazakhstan) D Popko	3	6	[10]
3	(Colombia) N Barrientos (Uruguay) A Behar	6	4	[10]
(Chinese Taipei) H-y Peng (Israel) A Weintraub	3	6	[4]
WC	(Uzbekistan) T Ismailov (Uzbekistan) Shonigmatjon Shofayziyev	2	0
(Italy) R Ghedin (Israel) D Sela	6	6
WC	(Uzbekistan) Saida'Lo Saidkarimov (Uzbekistan) Amal Sultanbekov	1	2
(Canada) S Diez (Brazil) C Zampieri	6	6
(Russia) A Karatsev (Belarus) A Vasilevski	6^{6}	3
4	(Ukraine) D Molchanov (Kazakhstan) A Nedovyesov	7^{8}	6
WC	(Uzbekistan) S Fayziev (Russia) M Kalovelonis	6^{1}	7	[5]
(Spain) E López-Pérez (India) J Nedunchezhiyan	7^{7}	5	[10]
(Chinese Taipei) C-p Hsieh (Chinese Taipei) T-h Yang	6	6
2	(South Africa) D O'Brien (South Africa) R Roelofse	1	2

Quarterfinals
1	(Belarus) S Betov (Russia) M Elgin	6^{9}	6^{5}
(Georgia (country)) A Metreveli (Kazakhstan) D Popko	7^{11}	7^{7}
3	(Colombia) N Barrientos (Uruguay) A Behar	5	6	[10]
(Italy) R Ghedin (Israel) D Sela	7	3	[5]
(Canada) S Diez (Brazil) C Zampieri	1	6^{4}
4	(Ukraine) D Molchanov (Kazakhstan) A Nedovyesov	6	7^{7}
(Spain) E López-Pérez (India) J Nedunchezhiyan	6	6
(Chinese Taipei) C-p Hsieh (Chinese Taipei) T-h Yang	4	3

Semifinals
(Georgia (country)) A Metreveli (Kazakhstan) D Popko	7^{7}	6
3	(Colombia) N Barrientos (Uruguay) A Behar	6^{5}	3
4	(Ukraine) D Molchanov (Kazakhstan) A Nedovyesov	4	4
(Spain) E López-Pérez (India) J Nedunchezhiyan	6	6

Final
(Georgia (country)) A Metreveli (Kazakhstan) D Popko	1	4
(Spain) E López-Pérez (India) J Nedunchezhiyan	6	6
