= 2017 Karshi Challenger – Singles =

Singles
- 2017 Karshi Challenger

Final
- Champion: (Belarus) Egor Gerasimov
- Runner-up: (Turkey) Cem İlkel
- Score: 6–3, 7–6^{(7–4)}

Events
Singles	Doubles
← 2016 ·	Karshi Challenger	· 2018 →

Marko Tepavac was the defending champion but chose not to defend his title.

Egor Gerasimov won the title after defeating Cem İlkel 6–3, 7–6^{(7–4)} in the final.

== Seeds ==
1. (Ukraine) Sergiy Stakhovsky (quarterfinals)
2. (Russia) Teymuraz Gabashvili (first round)
3. (Chinese Taipei) Jason Jung (first round)
4. (Spain) Adrián Menéndez Maceiras (first round)
5. (Kazakhstan) Dmitry Popko (semifinals)
6. (Belarus) Ilya Ivashka (first round)
7. (India) Ramkumar Ramanathan (first round)
8. (Bosnia and Herzegovina) Aldin Šetkić (second round)

== Draw ==
=== Key ===
- Q = Qualifier
- WC = Wild card
- LL = Lucky loser
- Alt = Alternate
- ITF = ITF entry
- PR = Protected ranking
- SR = Special ranking
- SE = Special exempt
- JE = Junior exempt
- JR = Junior Accelerator Programme entrant
- CO = College Accelerator Programme entrant
- NG = Next Gen Accelerator Program entrant
- w/o = Walkover
- r = Retired
- d = Defaulted

=== Finals ===
Semifinals
(India) Yuki Bhambri	1	4
(Belarus) Egor Gerasimov	6	6
(Turkey) Cem İlkel	3	7^{7}	6
5	(Kazakhstan) Dmitry Popko	6	6^{5}	4

Final
(Belarus) Egor Gerasimov	6	7^{7}
(Turkey) Cem İlkel	3	6^{4}

=== Top half ===
First round
1	(Ukraine) S Stakhovsky	6	6
Q	(Estonia) V Ivanov	2	3
(Egypt) K-M Maamoun	6	7^{9}
(Belarus) D Zhyrmont	2	6^{7}
(India) P Gunneswaran	4	2
(India) Y Bhambri	6	6
(Germany) K Krawietz	2	2
8	(Bosnia and Herzegovina) A Šetkić	6	6
3	(Chinese Taipei) J Jung	6^{9}	6	4
(Belarus) Y Shyla	7^{11}	4	6
(Ukraine) V Manafov	6	7
(India) V Vardhan	3	5
WC	(Uzbekistan) F Dustov	3	1
(India) S Balaji	6	6
(Belarus) E Gerasimov	6	7^{7}
6	(Belarus) I Ivashka	0	6^{1}

Second round
1	(Ukraine) S Stakhovsky	6	7^{7}
(Egypt) K-M Maamoun	4	6^{5}
(India) Y Bhambri	7	7
8	(Bosnia and Herzegovina) A Šetkić	5	5
(Belarus) Y Shyla	7^{7}	7
(Ukraine) V Manafov	6^{4}	5
(India) S Balaji	3	4
(Belarus) E Gerasimov	6	6

Quarterfinals
1	(Ukraine) S Stakhovsky	2	4
(India) Y Bhambri	6	6
(Belarus) Y Shyla	3	2
(Belarus) E Gerasimov	6	6

Semifinals
(India) Y Bhambri	1	4
(Belarus) E Gerasimov	6	6

=== Bottom half ===
First round
7	(India) R Ramanathan	4	4
(Turkey) C İlkel	6	6
Q	(Ukraine) D Molchanov	7	4	4
(Russia) A Vatutin	5	6	6
Q	(Russia) Vitaly Kozyukov	6	6
Q	(Russia) E Tyurnev	0	1
(Kazakhstan) A Nedovyesov	6^{8}	6	6
4	(Spain) A Menéndez Maceiras	7^{10}	3	4
5	(Kazakhstan) D Popko	7	6
(Russia) A Karatsev	5	1
WC	(Uzbekistan) T Ismailov	3	6^{4}
WC	(Uzbekistan) S Fayziev	6	7^{7}
(Czech Republic) Marek Jaloviec	6	0
WC	(Uzbekistan) J Karimov	1	0^{r}
(Russia) A Kudryavtsev	6	5	6
2	(Russia) T Gabashvili	3	7	4

Second round
(Turkey) C İlkel	6	7
(Russia) A Vatutin	2	5
Q	(Russia) V Kozyukov	4	4
(Kazakhstan) A Nedovyesov	6	6
5	(Kazakhstan) D Popko	6	6
WC	(Uzbekistan) S Fayziev	1	3
(Czech Republic) M Jaloviec	2	1
(Russia) A Kudryavtsev	6	6

Quarterfinals
(Turkey) C İlkel	3	7^{9}	6
(Kazakhstan) A Nedovyesov	6	6^{7}	3
5	(Kazakhstan) D Popko	6	6
(Russia) A Kudryavtsev	3	4

Semifinals
(Turkey) C İlkel	3	7^{7}	6
5	(Kazakhstan) D Popko	6	6^{5}	4
