= 2013 Karshi Challenger =

- Date: 6–12 May
- Edition: 7th
- Draw: 32S / 16D
- Prize money: $50,000
- Surface: Hard
- Location: Qarshi, Uzbekistan

Champions

Singles
- (Russia) Teymuraz Gabashvili

Doubles
- (Chinese Taipei) Chen Ti / (Spain) Guillermo Olaso
← 2012 ·	Karshi Challenger	· 2014 →

The 2013 Karshi Challenger was a professional tennis tournament played on hard courts. It was the seventh edition of the tournament which was part of the 2013 ATP Challenger Tour. It took place in Qarshi, Uzbekistan between 6 and 12 May 2013.

== Singles main-draw entrants ==
=== Seeds ===
Country	Player	Rank^{1}	Seed
RUS	Teymuraz Gabashvili	177	1
ISR	Amir Weintraub	183	2
RUS	Konstantin Kravchuk	187	3
UKR	Oleksandr Nedovyesov	194	4
CZE	Jan Mertl	196	5
TPE	Chen Ti	216	6
MDA	Radu Albot	246	7
BLR	Dzmitry Zhyrmont	269	8

- ^{1} Rankings are as of April 29, 2013.

=== Other entrants ===
The following players received wildcards into the singles main draw:

- (Uzbekistan) Sanjar Fayziev
- (Uzbekistan) Sarvar Ikramov
- (Uzbekistan) Temur Ismailov
- (Uzbekistan) Nigmat Shofayziev

The following players received entry from the qualifying draw:

- (Belarus) Aliaksandr Bury
- (Belarus) Egor Gerasimov
- (Uzbekistan) Vaja Uzakov
- (Russia) Alexey Vatutin

== Doubles main-draw entrants ==
=== Seeds ===
Country	Player	Country	Player	Rank^{1}	Seed
USA	James Cerretani	CAN	Adil Shamasdin	163	1
AUS	Jordan Kerr	RUS	Konstantin Kravchuk	248	2
MDA	Radu Albot	UKR	Oleksandr Nedovyesov	435	3
RUS	Teymuraz Gabashvili	ISR	Amir Weintraub	597	4

- ^{1} Rankings as of April 29, 2013.

=== Other entrants ===
The following pairs received wildcards into the doubles main draw:

- (Uzbekistan) Omad Boboqulov / (Uzbekistan) Pavel Tsoy
- (Uzbekistan) Sanjar Fayziev / (Uzbekistan) Nigmat Shofayziev
- (Uzbekistan) Sarvar Ikramov / (Uzbekistan) Batyr Sapaev

== Champions ==
=== Singles ===
- (Russia) Teymuraz Gabashvili def. (Moldova) Radu Albot, 6–4, 6–4

=== Doubles ===
- (Chinese Taipei) Chen Ti / (Spain) Guillermo Olaso def. (Australia) Jordan Kerr / (Russia) Konstantin Kravchuk, 7–6^{(7–5)}, 7–5
