= 2015 Karshi Challenger – Doubles =

Doubles
- 2015 Karshi Challenger

Final
- Champions: (India) Yuki Bhambri (Spain) Adrián Menéndez-Maceiras
- Runners-up: (Belarus) Sergey Betov (Russia) Mikhail Elgin
- Score: 5–7, 6–3, [10–8]

Events
Singles	Doubles
← 2014 ·	Karshi Challenger	· 2016 →

Sergey Betov and Alexander Bury were the defending champions, but decided not to compete together. Bury played alongside Teymuraz Gabashvili, but lost to Yaraslav Shyla and Andrei Vasilevski in the first round. Betov competed with Mikhail Elgin and reached the final, but lost to Yuki Bhambri and Adrián Menéndez-Maceiras, 7–5, 3–6, [8–10].

== Seeds ==
1. (Belarus) Alexander Bury / (Russia) Teymuraz Gabashvili (first round)
2. (Belarus) Sergey Betov / (Russia) Mikhail Elgin (final)
3. (India) Saketh Myneni / (India) Divij Sharan (quarterfinals)
4. (Italy) Riccardo Ghedin / (India) Ramkumar Ramanathan (quarterfinals)

== Draw ==
=== Key ===
- Q = Qualifier
- WC = Wild card
- LL = Lucky loser
- Alt = Alternate
- SE = Special exempt
- PR = Protected ranking
- ITF = ITF entry
- JE = Junior exempt
- w/o = Walkover
- r = Retired
- d = Defaulted
- SR = Special ranking

First round
1	(Belarus) A Bury (Russia) T Gabashvili	6	6^{5}	[8]
(Belarus) Y Shyla (Belarus) A Vasilevski	4	7^{7}	[10]
(Russia) E Donskoy (Australia) M Ebden	4	6	[10]
WC	(Uzbekistan) S Fayziev (Uzbekistan) J Karimov	6	3	[8]
3	(India) S Myneni (India) D Sharan	6	6
(Uzbekistan) T Ismailov (Uzbekistan) Shonigmatjon Shofayziyev	3	2
(Kazakhstan) Sagadat Ayap (Kazakhstan) T Khabibulin	5	1
(India) Y Bhambri (Spain) A Menéndez-Maceiras	7	6
(United Kingdom) B Klein (South Africa) R Roelofse	7^{7}	6
(Serbia) N Milojević (Bosnia and Herzegovina) A Šetkić	6^{4}	1
(Russia) A Karatsev (Russia) D Matsukevich	3	6^{5}
4	(Italy) R Ghedin (India) R Ramanathan	6	7^{7}
(Austria) D Novak (Russia) A Zaitcev	6	7^{7}
(Lithuania) L Grigelis (Slovakia) Adrian Sikora	3	6^{4}
(Chinese Taipei) T Chen (Belarus) D Zhyrmont	4	2
2	(Belarus) S Betov (Russia) M Elgin	6	6

Quarterfinals
(Belarus) Y Shyla (Belarus) A Vasilevski	3	3
(Russia) E Donskoy (Australia) M Ebden	6	6
3	(India) S Myneni (India) D Sharan	6	4	[7]
(India) Y Bhambri (Spain) A Menéndez-Maceiras	3	6	[10]
(United Kingdom) B Klein (South Africa) R Roelofse	6	3	[10]
4	(Italy) R Ghedin (India) R Ramanathan	3	6	[6]
(Austria) D Novak (Russia) A Zaitcev	6	2	[6]
2	(Belarus) S Betov (Russia) M Elgin	4	6	[10]

Semifinals
(Russia) E Donskoy (Australia) M Ebden	6	3	[7]
(India) Y Bhambri (Spain) A Menéndez-Maceiras	3	6	[10]
(United Kingdom) B Klein (South Africa) R Roelofse	4	2
2	(Belarus) S Betov (Russia) M Elgin	6	6

Final
(India) Y Bhambri (Spain) A Menéndez-Maceiras	5	6	[10]
2	(Belarus) S Betov (Russia) M Elgin	7	3	[8]
