= 2011 Karshi Challenger – Doubles =

Doubles
- 2011 Karshi Challenger

Final
- Champions: (Russia) Michail Elgin (Russia) Alexandre Kudryavtsev
- Runners-up: (Russia) Konstantin Kravchuk (Ukraine) Denys Molchanov
- Score: 3–6, 6–3, [11–9]

Events
Singles	Doubles
← 2010 ·	Karshi Challenger	· 2012 →

Gong Maoxin and Li Zhe were the defending champions, but decided not to participate.

Michail Elgin and Alexandre Kudryavtsev won the tournament, defeating Konstantin Kravchuk and Denys Molchanov 3–6, 6–3, [11–9] in the final.

== Seeds ==
1. (Russia) Michail Elgin / (Russia) Alexandre Kudryavtsev (champions)
2. (Thailand) Sanchai Ratiwatana / (Thailand) Sonchat Ratiwatana (first round)
3. (United States) John Paul Fruttero / (South Africa) Raven Klaasen (semifinals)
4. (Russia) Konstantin Kravchuk / (Ukraine) Denys Molchanov (final)

== Draw ==
=== Key ===
- Q = Qualifier
- WC = Wild card
- LL = Lucky loser
- Alt = Alternate
- SE = Special exempt
- PR = Protected ranking
- ITF = ITF entry
- JE = Junior exempt
- w/o = Walkover
- r = Retired
- d = Defaulted
- SR = Special ranking

=== Draw ===
First round
1	(Russia) M Elgin (Russia) A Kudryavtsev	6	6
(Chinese Taipei) T Chen (Czech Republic) J Minář	2	4
WC	(Uzbekistan) Temur Ismailov (Uzbekistan) D Istomin	5	1^{r}
(Austria) G Melzer (Spain) A Menéndez	7	2
3	(United States) JP Fruttero (South Africa) R Klaasen	6	6
Alt	(India) Vijayant Malik (India) Kento Takeuchi	2	2
(Moldova) R Albot (Ukraine) A Smirnov	6	3	[10]
(Uzbekistan) F Dustov (Russia) Mikhail Vasiliev	3	6	[5]
(Slovakia) A Martin (Slovakia) M Mečíř Jr.	7^{7}	6
WC	(Russia) Ervand Gasparyan (Uzbekistan) M Inoyatov	6^{1}	3
(India) D Sharan (India) V Vardhan	5	4
4	(Russia) K Kravchuk (Ukraine) D Molchanov	7	6
(Slovakia) I Klec (Slovakia) M Semjan	7	2	[8]
(Japan) Junn Mitsuhashi (Indonesia) C Rungkat	5	6	[10]
(France) L Recouderc (France) L Walter	6	3	[19]
2	(Thailand) Sa Ratiwatana (Thailand) So Ratiwatana	3	6	[17]

Quarterfinals
1	(Russia) M Elgin (Russia) A Kudryavtsev	6	6
(Austria) G Melzer (Spain) A Menéndez	0	1
3	(United States) JP Fruttero (South Africa) R Klaasen	7^{7}	7^{7}
(Moldova) R Albot (Ukraine) A Smirnov	6^{3}	6^{4}
(Slovakia) A Martin (Slovakia) M Mečíř Jr.
4	(Russia) K Kravchuk (Ukraine) D Molchanov	w/o
(Japan) Junn Mitsuhashi (Indonesia) C Rungkat	4	6	[10]
(France) L Recouderc (France) L Walter	6	2	[5]

Semifinals
1	(Russia) M Elgin (Russia) A Kudryavtsev	7^{8}	7
3	(United States) JP Fruttero (South Africa) R Klaasen	6^{6}	5
4	(Russia) K Kravchuk (Ukraine) D Molchanov	7^{7}	7^{7}
(Japan) Junn Mitsuhashi (Indonesia) C Rungkat	6^{3}	6^{3}

Final
1	(Russia) M Elgin (Russia) A Kudryavtsev	3	6	[11]
4	(Russia) K Kravchuk (Ukraine) D Molchanov	6	3	[9]
