= 2009 Karshi Challenger – Doubles =

Doubles
- 2009 Karshi Challenger

Final
- Champions: (Australia) Sadik Kadir (India) Purav Raja
- Runners-up: (Latvia) Andis Juška (Latvia) Deniss Pavlovs
- Score: 6–3, 7–6(4)

Events
Singles	Doubles
- Karshi Challenger

Łukasz Kubot and Oliver Marach chose to not defend their 2008 title.
Sadik Kadir and Purav Raja defeated Andis Juška and Deniss Pavlovs 6–3, 7–6(4) in the final.

== Seeds ==
1. (Canada) Pierre-Ludovic Duclos / (Ukraine) Denys Molchanov (quarterfinals)
2. (Spain) Carles Poch-Gradin / (United States) Rylan Rizza (quarterfinals)
3. (Russia) Michail Elgin / (Russia) Evgeny Kirillov (first round)
4. (Australia) Kaden Hensel / (Australia) Adam Hubble (semifinals)

== Draw ==
Key

- Q = Qualifier
- WC = Wild card
- LL = Lucky loser
- Alt = Alternate
- ITF = ITF entry
- PR = Protected ranking
- SR = Special ranking
- SE = Special exempt
- JE = Junior exempt
- JR = Junior Accelerator Programme entrant
- CO = College Accelerator Programme entrant
- NG = Next Gen Accelerator Program entrant
- w/o = Walkover
- r = Retired
- d = Defaulted

=== Draw ===
First round
1	(Canada) P-L Duclos (Ukraine) D Molchanov	7	6
(Chinese Taipei) H-h Lee (Chinese Taipei) T-h Yang	6^{6}	3
(Australia) S Kadir (India) P Raja	6	6
WC	(Uzbekistan) J Jalalov (Uzbekistan) S Shipilov	2	0
4	(Australia) K Hensel (Australia) A Hubble	6	7
WC	(Uzbekistan) R Biktyakov (Uzbekistan) M Inoyatov	2	6^{0}
(Kazakhstan) A Kedryuk (Japan) J Mitsuhashi	6	6
WC	(Lithuania) R Berankis (Uzbekistan) V Uzakov	3	3
(Ukraine) I Marchenko (Ukraine) I Sergeyev	6^{7}	3
(Latvia) A Juška (Latvia) D Pavlovs	7	6
(Jamaica) D Brown (Austria) R Eitzinger	2	6	[10]
3	(Russia) M Elgin (Russia) E Kirillov	6	3	[8]
(Spain) G Alcaide (Czech Republic) J Krkoška	6	4	[11]
(Slovakia) Čapkovič (Slovakia) M Semjan	3	6	[9]
(Chinese Taipei) T Chen (Australia) G Jones	7	2	[7]
2	(Spain) C Poch-Gradin (United States) R Rizza	5	6	[10]

Quarterfinals
1	(Canada) P-L Duclos (Ukraine) D Molchanov	2	3
(Australia) S Kadir (India) P Raja	6	6
4	(Australia) K Hensel (Australia) A Hubble	6	3	[10]
(Kazakhstan) A Kedryuk (Japan) J Mitsuhashi	4	6	[6]
(Latvia) A Juška (Latvia) D Pavlovs	6	6
(Jamaica) D Brown (Austria) R Eitzinger	1	3
(Spain) G Alcaide (Czech Republic) J Krkoška	6	6
2	(Spain) C Poch-Gradin (United States) R Rizza	4	2

Semifinals
(Australia) S Kadir (India) P Raja	7	6
4	(Australia) K Hensel (Australia) A Hubble	6^{4}	4
(Latvia) A Juška (Latvia) D Pavlovs	6	7
(Spain) G Alcaide (Czech Republic) J Krkoška	3	6^{6}

Finals
(Australia) S Kadir (India) P Raja	6	7
(Latvia) A Juška (Latvia) D Pavlovs	3	6^{4}
