= 2010 Karshi Challenger =

- Date: August 16 – August 21
- Edition: 4th
- Location: Qarshi, Uzbekistan

Champions

Singles
- (Slovenia) Blaž Kavčič

Doubles
- (China) Gong Maoxin / (China) Li Zhe
| ← 2009 · | Karshi Challenger | · 2011 → |

The 2010 Karshi Challenger was a professional tennis tournament played on outdoor hard courts. It was the fourth edition of the tournament which is part of the 2010 ATP Challenger Tour. It took place in Qarshi, Uzbekistan between 16 and 21 August 2010.

== ATP entrants ==
=== Seeds ===
| Nationality | Player | Ranking* | Seeding |
|---|---|---|---|
| SLO | Blaž Kavčič | 155 | 1 |
| RUS | Konstantin Kravchuk | 156 | 2 |
| SVK | Andrej Martin | 287 | 3 |
| SVK | Marek Semjan | 296 | 4 |
| RUS | Andrey Kumantsov | 299 | 5 |
| LAT | Andis Juška | 313 | 6 |
| CZE | Jan Minář | 316 | 7 |
| ESP | Carles Poch-Gradin | 323 | 8 |

- Rankings are as of August 9, 2010.

=== Other entrants ===
The following players received wildcards into the singles main draw:

- (Uzbekistan) Murad Inoyatov
- (Uzbekistan) Temur Ismailov
- (Uzbekistan) Abduvoris Saidmukhamedov
- (Uzbekistan) Vaja Uzakov

The following players received entry from the qualifying draw:

- (Australia) Samuel Groth
- (Ukraine) Artem Smirnov
- (India) Vishnu Vardhan
- (New Zealand) Michael Venus

== Champions ==
=== Singles ===
(Slovenia) Blaž Kavčič def. (New Zealand) Michael Venus, 7–6(6), 7–6(5)

=== Doubles ===
(China) Gong Maoxin / (China) Li Zhe def. (India) Divij Sharan / (India) Vishnu Vardhan, 6–3, 6–1
