= 2014 Karshi Challenger – Doubles =

Doubles
- 2014 Karshi Challenger

Final
- Champion: (Belarus) Sergey Betov (Belarus) Alexander Bury
- Runner-up: (China) Gong Maoxin (Chinese Taipei) Peng Hsien-yin
- Score: 7–5, 1–6, [10–6]

Events
Singles	Doubles
← 2013 ·	Karshi Challenger	· 2015 →

Chen Ti and Guillermo Olaso were the defending champions, but Olaso decided not to compete. Chen Ti played alongside Sriram Balaji and lost in the quarterfinals to Gong Maoxin and Peng Hsien-yin.

Sergey Betov and Alexander Bury won the title, defeating Gong Maoxin and Peng Hsien-yin in the final, 7–5, 1–6, [10–6].

== Seeds ==
1. (Russia) Victor Baluda / (Russia) Konstantin Kravchuk (quarterfinals)
2. (India) Sriram Balaji / (Chinese Taipei) Chen Ti (quarterfinals)
3. (Republic of Ireland) James Cluskey / (India) Saketh Myneni (semifinals)
4. (Chinese Taipei) Huang Liang-chi / (India) Divij Sharan (semifinals)

== Draw ==
=== Key ===
- Q = Qualifier
- WC = Wild card
- LL = Lucky loser
- Alt = Alternate
- SE = Special exempt
- PR = Protected ranking
- ITF = ITF entry
- JE = Junior exempt
- w/o = Walkover
- r = Retired
- d = Defaulted
- SR = Special ranking

=== Draw ===
First round
1	(Russia) V Baluda (Russia) K Kravchuk	7^{7}	6
WC	(Uzbekistan) Shonigmatjon Shofayziyev (Uzbekistan) V Uzakov	6^{3}	1
(Belarus) S Betov (Belarus) A Bury	5	7^{7}	[10]
(Japan) Shuichi Sekiguchi (Bosnia and Herzegovina) A Šetkić	7	6^{5}	[8]
3	(Republic of Ireland) J Cluskey (India) S Myneni	6	6
WC	(Uzbekistan) Omad Boboqulov (Uzbekistan) Mikhail Esipov	1	1
PR	(United States) J Cerretani (France) O Charroin	5	6	[3]
(United States) C Buchanan (India) J Nedunchezhiyan	7	4	[10]
(Netherlands) A van der Duim (Netherlands) B Westerhof	6	6
WC	(Uzbekistan) S Fayziev (Uzbekistan) T Ismailov	2	2
(Russia) Alexander Lobkov (Russia) V Rudnev	3	1
4	(Chinese Taipei) L-c Huang (India) D Sharan	6	6
(Russia) A Kudryavtsev (Belarus) D Zhyrmont	3	6	[10]
(China) M Gong (Chinese Taipei) H-y Peng	6	3	[12]
(Ukraine) D Molchanov (Ukraine) A Smirnov	6^{5}	4
2	(India) S Balaji (Chinese Taipei) T Chen	7^{7}	6

Quarterfinals
1	(Russia) V Baluda (Russia) K Kravchuk	5	6^{4}
(Belarus) S Betov (Belarus) A Bury	7	7^{7}
3	(Republic of Ireland) J Cluskey (India) S Myneni	7^{7}	6
(United States) C Buchanan (India) J Nedunchezhiyan	6^{5}	3
(Netherlands) A van der Duim (Netherlands) B Westerhof	2	5
4	(Chinese Taipei) L-c Huang (India) D Sharan	6	7
(China) M Gong (Chinese Taipei) H-y Peng	6	4	[10]
2	(India) S Balaji (Chinese Taipei) T Chen	3	6	[6]

Semifinals
(Belarus) S Betov (Belarus) A Bury	6	6
3	(Republic of Ireland) J Cluskey (India) S Myneni	4	4
4	(Chinese Taipei) L-c Huang (India) D Sharan	3	3
(China) M Gong (Chinese Taipei) H-y Peng	6	6

Final
(Belarus) S Betov (Belarus) A Bury	7	1	[10]
(China) M Gong (Chinese Taipei) H-y Peng	5	6	[6]
