= 2015 Karshi Challenger – Singles =

Singles
- 2015 Karshi Challenger

Final
- Champion: (Russia) Teymuraz Gabashvili
- Runner-up: (Russia) Evgeny Donskoy
- Score: 5–2, retired

Events
Singles	Doubles
- Karshi Challenger

Nikoloz Basilashvili was the defending champion, but decided not to compete.

Teymuraz Gabashvili won the tournament after Evgeny Donskoy was forced to retire in the final due to a right ankle injury.

== Seeds ==
1. (Russia) Teymuraz Gabashvili (champion)
2. (Uzbekistan) Farrukh Dustov (first round)
3. (Spain) Adrián Menéndez Maceiras (quarterfinals)
4. (Russia) Aslan Karatsev (semifinals)
5. (Russia) Evgeny Donskoy (final, retired)
6. (Chinese Taipei) Chen Ti (first round)
7. (United Kingdom) Brydan Klein (first round)
8. (India) Yuki Bhambri (quarterfinals)

== Draw ==
Key

- Q = Qualifier
- WC = Wild card
- LL = Lucky loser
- Alt = Alternate
- ITF = ITF entry
- PR = Protected ranking
- SR = Special ranking
- SE = Special exempt
- JE = Junior exempt
- JR = Junior Accelerator Programme entrant
- CO = College Accelerator Programme entrant
- NG = Next Gen Accelerator Program entrant
- w/o = Walkover
- r = Retired
- d = Defaulted

=== Finals ===
Semifinals
1	(Russia) Teymuraz Gabashvili	6	3	6
4	(Russia) Aslan Karatsev	4	6	2
5	(Russia) Evgeny Donskoy	6	6
(Australia) Matthew Ebden	4	4

Final
1	(Russia) Teymuraz Gabashvili	5
5	(Russia) Evgeny Donskoy	2^{r}

=== Top half ===
First round
1	(Russia) T Gabashvili	7^{7}	6
WC	(Uzbekistan) T Ismailov	6^{4}	3
(Serbia) N Milojević	6	6
WC	(Uzbekistan) S Fayziev	4	2
(Lithuania) L Grigelis	7^{7}	2	6
(Slovakia) F Horanský	6^{4}	6	3
(Serbia) P Krstin	6	4	3
8	(India) Y Bhambri	4	6	6
4	(Russia) A Karatsev	7	6
Q	(Belarus) Y Shyla	5	3
Q	(Belarus) S Betov	6	6
WC	(Uzbekistan) J Karimov	3	1
LL	(Russia) I Gakhov	6	7^{7}
(Belarus) D Zhyrmont	4	6^{2}
Q	(Italy) R Ghedin	6	6
7	(United Kingdom) B Klein	2	4

Second round
1	(Russia) T Gabashvili	6	6
(Serbia) N Milojević	4	3
(Lithuania) L Grigelis	6^{2}	1
8	(India) Y Bhambri	7^{7}	6
4	(Russia) A Karatsev	6	6
Q	(Belarus) S Betov	4	2
LL	(Russia) I Gakhov	4	1
Q	(Italy) R Ghedin	6	6

Quarterfinals
1	(Russia) T Gabashvili	6	6
8	(India) Y Bhambri	1	3
4	(Russia) A Karatsev	6	6
Q	(Italy) R Ghedin	3	0

Semifinals
1	(Russia) T Gabashvili	6	3	6
4	(Russia) A Karatsev	4	6	2

=== Bottom half ===
First round
5	(Russia) E Donskoy	6	6
(India) R Ramanathan	1	1
WC	(Kazakhstan) Sagadat Ayap	4	4
(Germany) R Becker	6	6
(India) S Myneni	7^{7}	6
Q	(Russia) D Matsukevich	6^{5}	4
(Slovakia) Adrian Sikora	4	2
3	(Spain) A Menéndez Maceiras	6	6
6	(Chinese Taipei) T Chen	6	5	1
(Australia) M Ebden	2	7	6
(Russia) A Zaitcev	3	5
(Switzerland) A Bossel	6	7
(Austria) D Novak	6	6
(Estonia) V Ivanov	1	4
(Bosnia and Herzegovina) A Šetkić	6	6
2	(Uzbekistan) F Dustov	3	1

Second round
5	(Russia) E Donskoy	6	1
(Germany) R Becker	3	1^{r}
(India) S Myneni	6^{12}	2
3	(Spain) A Menéndez Maceiras	7^{14}	6
(Australia) M Ebden	7^{7}	6
(Switzerland) A Bossel	6^{3}	4
(Austria) D Novak	6	2	6^{4}
(Bosnia and Herzegovina) A Šetkić	1	6	7^{7}

Quarterfinals
5	(Russia) E Donskoy	7^{7}	6
3	(Spain) A Menéndez Maceiras	6^{2}	3
(Australia) M Ebden	6	6
(Bosnia and Herzegovina) A Šetkić	1	1

Semifinals
5	(Russia) E Donskoy	6	6
(Australia) M Ebden	4	4
