= 2011 Karshi Challenger – Singles =

Singles
- 2011 Karshi Challenger

Final
- Champion: (Uzbekistan) Denis Istomin
- Runner-up: (Slovenia) Blaž Kavčič
- Score: 6–3, 1–6, 6–1

Events
Singles	Doubles
← 2010 ·	Karshi Challenger	· 2012 →

Blaž Kavčič was the defending champion. He reached the final but Denis Istomin defeated him 6–3, 1–6, 6–1 and won the title.

== Seeds ==
1. (Slovenia) Blaž Kavčič (final)
2. (Uzbekistan) Denis Istomin (champion)
3. (Russia) Konstantin Kravchuk (semifinals)
4. (Russia) Alexander Kudryavtsev (quarterfinals)
5. (Slovakia) Andrej Martin (second round)
6. (Chinese Taipei) Yang Tsung-hua (second round)
7. (Uzbekistan) Farrukh Dustov (quarterfinals, retired due right shoulder injury)
8. (Slovakia) Ivo Klec (first round)

== Draw ==
=== Key ===
- Q = Qualifier
- WC = Wild card
- LL = Lucky loser
- Alt = Alternate
- ITF = ITF entry
- PR = Protected ranking
- SR = Special ranking
- SE = Special exempt
- JE = Junior exempt
- JR = Junior Accelerator Programme entrant
- CO = College Accelerator Programme entrant
- NG = Next Gen Accelerator Program entrant
- w/o = Walkover
- r = Retired
- d = Defaulted

=== Finals ===
Semifinals
1	(Slovenia) Blaž Kavčič	6	5	6
Q	(Russia) Mikhail Ledovskikh	3	7	4
3	(Russia) Konstantin Kravchuk	6^{8}	3
2/SE	(Uzbekistan) Denis Istomin	7^{10}	6

Final
1	(Slovenia) Blaž Kavčič	3	6	1
2/SE	(Uzbekistan) Denis Istomin	6	1	6

=== Top half ===
First round
1	(Slovenia) B Kavčič	6	7
(Slovakia) M Semjan	2	5
(South Africa) R Klaasen	4	6^{5}
WC	(Uzbekistan) M Inoyatov	6	7^{7}
(Ukraine) A Smirnov	6	1	6^{4}
(France) L Recouderc	2	6	7^{7}
(India) V Vardhan	4	7	4
7/WC	(Uzbekistan) F Dustov	6	5	6
4	(Russia) A Kudryavtsev	6	4
(Slovakia) M Mečíř Jr.	4	0^{r}
(Moldova) R Albot	7	7^{7}
(India) K Rastogi	5	6^{3}
Q	(Russia) M Ledovskikh	3	7^{7}	6
(Russia) Mikhail Vasiliev	6	6^{5}	2
Q	(Uzbekistan) S Ikramov	4	4
5	(Slovakia) A Martin	6	6

Second round
1	(Slovenia) B Kavčič	6	6
WC	(Uzbekistan) M Inoyatov	2	2
(France) L Recouderc	5	2
7/WC	(Uzbekistan) F Dustov	7	6
4	(Russia) A Kudryavtsev	6	7^{8}
(Moldova) R Albot	0	6^{6}
Q	(Russia) M Ledovskikh	6^{2}	6	6
5	(Slovakia) A Martin	7^{7}	1	3

Quarterfinals
1	(Slovenia) B Kavčič	6	4
7/WC	(Uzbekistan) F Dustov	4	0^{r}
4	(Russia) A Kudryavtsev	3	4
Q	(Russia) M Ledovskikh	6	6

Semifinals
1	(Slovenia) B Kavčič	6	5	6
Q	(Russia) M Ledovskikh	3	7	4

=== Bottom half ===
First round
8	(Slovakia) I Klec	6^{3}	5
(Ukraine) D Molchanov	7^{7}	7
LL	(Japan) Junn Mitsuhashi	3	1
WC	(Indonesia) C Rungkat	6	6
Q	(Austria) G Melzer	3	4
(Spain) A Menéndez	6	6
(Chinese Taipei) T Chen	6^{5}	6^{8}
3	(Russia) K Kravchuk	7^{7}	7^{8}
6	(Chinese Taipei) T-h Yang	6	6
(Czech Republic) J Minář	3	1
(Serbia) D Lajović	6	5
WC	(Uzbekistan) Nigmat Shofayziev	2	0^{r}
(France) L Walter	6	1	2
Q	(Russia) M Elgin	4	6	6
(United Kingdom) D Evans	1	0
2/SE	(Uzbekistan) D Istomin	6	6

Second round
(Ukraine) D Molchanov	6	3	6
WC	(Indonesia) C Rungkat	1	6	4
(Spain) A Menéndez	6^{2}	5
3	(Russia) K Kravchuk	7^{7}	7
6	(Chinese Taipei) T-h Yang	2	2
(Serbia) D Lajović	6	6
Q	(Russia) M Elgin	3	1
2/SE	(Uzbekistan) D Istomin	6	6

Quarterfinals
(Ukraine) D Molchanov	6	4	1
3	(Russia) K Kravchuk	4	6	6
(Serbia) D Lajović	3	0
2/SE	(Uzbekistan) D Istomin	6	6

Semifinals
3	(Russia) K Kravchuk	6^{8}	3
2/SE	(Uzbekistan) D Istomin	7^{10}	6
