= 2010 Karshi Challenger – Doubles =

Doubles
- 2010 Karshi Challenger

Final
- Champion: (China) Gong Maoxin (China) Li Zhe
- Runner-up: (India) Divij Sharan (India) Vishnu Vardhan
- Score: 6–3, 6–1

Events
Singles	Doubles
- Karshi Challenger

Sadik Kadir and Purav Raja were the defending champions, but they lost to Murad Inoyatov and Andrey Kumantsov in the first round.
Gong Maoxin and Li Zhe won the title, by defeating Divij Sharan and Vishnu Vardhan 6–3, 6–1 in the final.

== Seeds ==
1. (Australia) Sadik Kadir / (India) Purav Raja (first round)
2. (Ukraine) Denys Molchanov / (Ukraine) Artem Smirnov (semifinals)
3. (Chinese Taipei) Lee Hsin-han / (Chinese Taipei) Yang Tsung-hua (quarterfinals)
4. (Latvia) Andis Juška / (Latvia) Deniss Pavlovs (first round)

== Draw ==
Key

- Q = Qualifier
- WC = Wild card
- LL = Lucky loser
- Alt = Alternate
- ITF = ITF entry
- PR = Protected ranking
- SR = Special ranking
- SE = Special exempt
- JE = Junior exempt
- JR = Junior Accelerator Programme entrant
- CO = College Accelerator Programme entrant
- NG = Next Gen Accelerator Program entrant
- w/o = Walkover
- r = Retired
- d = Defaulted

=== Draw ===
First round
1	(Australia) S Kadir (India) P Raja	5	1
(Uzbekistan) M Inoyatov (Russia) A Kumantsov	7	6
(Slovenia) B Kavčič (Serbia) B Pašanski	1	6^{0}
(Russia) M Elgin (Russia) K Kravchuk	6	7
4	(Latvia) A Juška (Latvia) D Pavlovs	6	0	[4]
(Kazakhstan) A Kedryuk (Russia) D Matsukevich	4	6	[10]
(China) M Gong (China) Z Li	4	7	[10]
(Spain) C Poch-Gradin (Argentina) J-M Valverde	6	6^{5}	[8]
(India) D Sharan (India) V Vardhan	7	6
ALT	(Uzbekistan) A Asanov (Australia) S Groth	5	2
(Czech Republic) J Minář (Slovakia) M Semjan	4	6^{4}
3	(Chinese Taipei) H-h Lee (Chinese Taipei) T-h Yang	6	7
WC	(Uzbekistan) S Ikramov (Uzbekistan) T Ismailov	6	6
WC	(Uzbekistan) B Kamiljanov (Uzbekistan) N Shofayziev	4	3
WC	(Uzbekistan) J Kaydarov (Uzbekistan) V Uzakov	0	r
2	(Ukraine) D Molchanov (Ukraine) A Smirnov	6

Quarterfinals
(Uzbekistan) M Inoyatov (Russia) A Kumantsov	1	2
(Russia) M Elgin (Russia) K Kravchuk	6	6
(Kazakhstan) A Kedryuk (Russia) D Matsukevich	7	4	[4]
(China) M Gong (China) Z Li	6^{4}	6	[10]
(India) D Sharan (India) V Vardhan	7	6
3	(Chinese Taipei) H-h Lee (Chinese Taipei) T-h Yang	6^{2}	4
WC	(Uzbekistan) S Ikramov (Uzbekistan) T Ismailov	1	3
2	(Ukraine) D Molchanov (Ukraine) A Smirnov	6	6

Semifinals
(Russia) M Elgin (Russia) K Kravchuk	3	4
(China) M Gong (China) Z Li	6	6
(India) D Sharan (India) V Vardhan	7	6
2	(Ukraine) D Molchanov (Ukraine) A Smirnov	6^{1}	1

Finals
(China) M Gong (China) Z Li	6	6
(India) D Sharan (India) V Vardhan	3	1
