= 2016 Karshi Challenger – Singles =

Singles
- 2016 Karshi Challenger

Final
- Champion: (Serbia) Marko Tepavac
- Runner-up: (Israel) Dudi Sela
- Score: 2–6, 6–3, 7–6^{(7–4)}

Events
Singles	Doubles
- Karshi Challenger

Teymuraz Gabashvili was the defending champion but chose not to participate.

Marko Tepavac won the title after defeating Dudi Sela 2–6, 6–3, 7–6^{(7–4)} in the final.

== Seeds ==
1. (Israel) Dudi Sela (final)
2. (Russia) Karen Khachanov (quarterfinals)
3. (Moldova) Radu Albot (semifinals)
4. (Kazakhstan) Aleksandr Nedovyesov (second round)
5. (Israel) Amir Weintraub (first round)
6. (Ukraine) Denys Molchanov (first round)
7. (Kazakhstan) Dmitry Popko (quarterfinals)
8. (Russia) Aslan Karatsev (second round)

== Draw ==
Key

- Q = Qualifier
- WC = Wild card
- LL = Lucky loser
- Alt = Alternate
- ITF = ITF entry
- PR = Protected ranking
- SR = Special ranking
- SE = Special exempt
- JE = Junior exempt
- JR = Junior Accelerator Programme entrant
- CO = College Accelerator Programme entrant
- NG = Next Gen Accelerator Program entrant
- w/o = Walkover
- r = Retired
- d = Defaulted

=== Finals ===
Semifinals
1	(Israel) Dudi Sela	6	6
3	(Moldova) Radu Albot	4	4
(Belarus) Ilya Ivashka	4	6	5
(Serbia) Marko Tepavac	6	3	7

Final
1	(Israel) Dudi Sela	6	3	6^{4}
(Serbia) Marko Tepavac	2	6	7^{7}

=== Top half ===
First round
1	(Israel) D Sela	6	2
Q	(Belarus) S Betov	1	1^{r}
WC	(Uzbekistan) Pavel Tsoy	1	3
(Serbia) N Milojević	6	6
(Argentina) A Velotti	6	6
Q	(Russia) D Matsukevich	1	4
Q	(Italy) Francesco Vilardo	3	6	6^{4}
7	(Kazakhstan) D Popko	6	1	7^{7}
3	(Moldova) R Albot	7^{7}	6
WC	(Uzbekistan) S Fayziev	6^{3}	4
(Brazil) C Zampieri	2	6^{4}
(Colombia) N Barrientos	6	7^{7}
(South Africa) L Harris	7	3	3
(Belarus) M Dubarenco	5	6	6
(Switzerland) A Bossel	4	6	3
8	(Russia) A Karatsev	6	4	6

Second round
1	(Israel) D Sela	6	6
(Serbia) N Milojević	1	2
(Argentina) A Velotti	6	5	4
7	(Kazakhstan) D Popko	4	7	6
3	(Moldova) R Albot	6	6
(Colombia) N Barrientos	0	1
(Belarus) M Dubarenco	6	6
8	(Russia) A Karatsev	1	2

Quarterfinals
1	(Israel) D Sela	6^{5}	7^{7}	6
7	(Kazakhstan) D Popko	7^{7}	6^{3}	4
3	(Moldova) R Albot	7^{7}	2	6
(Belarus) M Dubarenco	6^{2}	6	0

Semifinals
1	(Israel) D Sela	6	6
3	(Moldova) R Albot	4	4

=== Bottom half ===
First round
6	(Ukraine) D Molchanov	6^{7}	2
Q	(Russia) R Muzaev	7^{9}	6
(Canada) S Diez	6	7^{9}
(Netherlands) S Griekspoor	2	6^{7}
WC	(Uzbekistan) T Ismailov	5	4
(Belarus) I Ivashka	7	6
(Spain) E López-Pérez	3	6	3
4	(Kazakhstan) A Nedovyesov	6	4	6
5	(Israel) A Weintraub	4	2
(Italy) A Bega	6	6
(Chinese Taipei) T-h Yang	3	1
(Serbia) M Tepavac	6	6
WC	(Uzbekistan) Shonigmatjon Shofayziyev	7^{8}	2	6^{2}
LL	(Republic of Ireland) S Barry	6^{6}	6	7^{7}
(Georgia (country)) A Metreveli	2	2
2	(Russia) K Khachanov	6	6

Second round
Q	(Russia) R Muzaev	1	4
(Canada) S Diez	6	6
(Belarus) I Ivashka	6	3	6
4	(Kazakhstan) A Nedovyesov	3	6	2
(Italy) A Bega	5	4
(Serbia) M Tepavac	7	6
LL	(Republic of Ireland) S Barry	1	4
2	(Russia) K Khachanov	6	6

Quarterfinals
(Canada) S Diez	3	1
(Belarus) I Ivashka	6	6
(Serbia) M Tepavac	7^{7}	6
2	(Russia) K Khachanov	6^{5}	4

Semifinals
(Belarus) I Ivashka	4	6	5
(Serbia) M Tepavac	6	3	7
