= 2017 Karshi Challenger =

- Date: 8–13 May
- Edition: 11th
- Draw: 32S / 16D
- Surface: Hard
- Location: Qarshi, Uzbekistan

Champions

Singles
- (Belarus) Egor Gerasimov

Doubles
- (Ukraine) Denys Molchanov / (Ukraine) Sergiy Stakhovsky
| ← 2016 · | Karshi Challenger | · 2018 → |

The 2017 Karshi Challenger was a professional tennis tournament played on hard courts. It was the eleventh edition of the tournament which was part of the 2017 ATP Challenger Tour. It took place in Qarshi, Uzbekistan between 8 and 13 May 2017.

== Singles main-draw entrants ==
=== Seeds ===
| Country | Player | Rank^{1} | Seed |
|---|---|---|---|
| UKR | Sergiy Stakhovsky | 96 | 1 |
| RUS | Teymuraz Gabashvili | 159 | 2 |
| TPE | Jason Jung | 167 | 3 |
| ESP | Adrián Menéndez Maceiras | 175 | 4 |
| KAZ | Dmitry Popko | 182 | 5 |
| BLR | Ilya Ivashka | 183 | 6 |
| IND | Ramkumar Ramanathan | 217 | 7 |
| BIH | Aldin Šetkić | 221 | 8 |

- ^{1} Rankings as of May 1, 2017.

=== Other entrants ===
The following players received wildcards into the singles main draw:

- (Uzbekistan) Farrukh Dustov
- (Uzbekistan) Sanjar Fayziev
- (Uzbekistan) Temur Ismailov
- (Uzbekistan) Jurabek Karimov

The following players received entry from the qualifying draw:

- (Estonia) Vladimir Ivanov
- (Russia) Vitaly Kozyukov
- (Ukraine) Denys Molchanov
- (Russia) Evgenii Tiurnev

== Champions ==
=== Singles ===
- (Belarus) Egor Gerasimov def. (Turkey) Cem İlkel 6–3, 7–6^{(7–4)}.

=== Doubles ===
- (Ukraine) Denys Molchanov / (Ukraine) Sergiy Stakhovsky def. (Germany) Kevin Krawietz / (Spain) Adrián Menéndez Maceiras 6–4, 7–6^{(9–7)}.
