= 2009 Karshi Challenger – Singles =

Singles
- 2009 Karshi Challenger

Final
- Champion: (Austria) Rainer Eitzinger
- Runner-up: (Ukraine) Ivan Sergeyev
- Score: 6–3, 1–6, 7–6(3)

Events
Singles	Doubles
- Karshi Challenger

Denis Istomin was the champion in 2007 and 2008, but he chose to not compete this year.
Rainer Eitzinger won in the final 6–3, 1–6, 7–6(3), against Ivan Sergeyev.

== Seeds ==
1. (Russia) Mikhail Elgin (first round)
2. (Ukraine) Illya Marchenko (second round)
3. (Slovakia) Kamil Čapkovič (second round)
4. (Spain) Carles Poch Gradin (semifinals)
5. (Latvia) Andis Juška (second round)
6. (Ukraine) Ivan Sergeyev (final)
7. (Latvia) Deniss Pavlovs (second round)
8. (Russia) Valery Rudnev (first round)

== Draw ==
Key

- Q = Qualifier
- WC = Wild card
- LL = Lucky loser
- Alt = Alternate
- ITF = ITF entry
- PR = Protected ranking
- SR = Special ranking
- SE = Special exempt
- JE = Junior exempt
- JR = Junior Accelerator Programme entrant
- CO = College Accelerator Programme entrant
- NG = Next Gen Accelerator Program entrant
- w/o = Walkover
- r = Retired
- d = Defaulted

=== Final four ===
Semifinals
(Austria) Rainer Eitzinger	6	7
4	(Spain) Carles Poch Gradin	3	5
Q	(Lithuania) Ričardas Berankis	2	1^{r}
6	(Ukraine) Ivan Sergeyev	6	4

Final
(Austria) Rainer Eitzinger	6	1	7
6	(Ukraine) Ivan Sergeyev	3	6	6^{3}

=== Top half ===
First round
1	(Russia) M Elgin	6^{3}	5
(France) M Rodrigues	7	7
(Croatia) A Sančić	3	0^{r}
(Austria) R Eitzinger	6	4
(Kazakhstan) A Kedryuk	3	6	2
(Australia) G Jones	6	4	6
WC	(Uzbekistan) S Shipilov	1	1
7	(Latvia) D Pavlovs	6	6
4	(Spain) C Poch Gradin	7	6
WC	(Uzbekistan) V Uzakov	6^{1}	3
(Japan) J Mitsuhashi	6	1	6
(Chinese Taipei) T-h Yang	2	6	3
Q	(Russia) M Ledovskikh	5	2
(Serbia) N Ćirić	7	6
WC	(Uzbekistan) J Jalalov	0	0
5	(Latvia) A Juška	6	6

Second round
(France) M Rodrigues	0	6	6^{3}
(Austria) R Eitzinger	6	3	7
(Australia) G Jones	6	6
7	(Latvia) D Pavlovs	4	1
4	(Spain) C Poch Gradin	6	6
(Japan) J Mitsuhashi	2	2
(Serbia) N Ćirić	6	7
5	(Latvia) A Juška	3	6^{3}

Quarterfinals
(Austria) R Eitzinger	6	6
(Australia) G Jones	4	0
4	(Spain) C Poch Gradin	7	4	6
(Serbia) N Ćirić	6^{4}	6	1

Semifinals
(Austria) R Eitzinger	6	7
4	(Spain) C Poch Gradin	3	5

=== Bottom half ===
First round
8	(Russia) V Rudnev	6^{6}	1
(Belgium) D Goffin	7	6
(Chinese Taipei) T Chen	6^{3}	3
(Jamaica) D Brown	7	6
LL	(Germany) P Taubert	6^{5}	2
(Lithuania) R Berankis	7	6
WC	(Uzbekistan) R Biktyakov	2	3
3	(Slovakia) K Čapkovič	6	6
6	(Ukraine) I Sergeyev	6	6
Q	(Uzbekistan) M Inoyatov	3	4
(Spain) G Alcaide	6^{4}	6^{2}
(Slovakia) M Semjan	7	7
(New Zealand) J Statham	3	2
Q	(Australia) S Kadir	6	6
(Canada) P-L Duclos	6	3	1
2	(Ukraine) I Marchenko	3	6	6

Second round
(Belgium) D Goffin	5	3
(Jamaica) D Brown	7	6
(Lithuania) R Berankis	6	6
3	(Slovakia) K Čapkovič	3	4
6	(Ukraine) I Sergeyev	7	6
(Slovakia) M Semjan	6^{0}	3
Q	(Australia) S Kadir	4	6	7
2	(Ukraine) I Marchenko	6	3	5

Quarterfinals
(Jamaica) D Brown	6^{5}	6	3
(Lithuania) R Berankis	7	3	6
6	(Ukraine) I Sergeyev	6	7
Q	(Australia) S Kadir	4	5

Semifinals
(Lithuania) R Berankis	2	1^{r}
6	(Ukraine) I Sergeyev	6	4
