= 2015 Karshi Challenger =

- Date: 4–10 May
- Edition: 9th
- Draw: 32S / 16D
- Prize money: $50,000
- Surface: Hard
- Location: Qarshi, Uzbekistan

Champions

Singles
- (Russia) Teymuraz Gabashvili

Doubles
- (India) Yuki Bhambri / (Spain) Adrián Menéndez Maceiras
← 2014 ·	Karshi Challenger	· 2016 →

The 2015 Karshi Challenger was a professional tennis tournament played on hard courts. It was the ninth edition of the tournament which was part of the 2015 ATP Challenger Tour. It took place in Qarshi, Uzbekistan between 4 and 10 May 2015.

== Singles main-draw entrants ==
=== Seeds ===
Country	Player	Rank^{1}	Seed
RUS	Teymuraz Gabashvili	100	1
UZB	Farrukh Dustov	108	2
ESP	Adrián Menéndez Maceiras	118	3
RUS	Aslan Karatsev	166	4
RUS	Evgeny Donskoy	196	5
TPE	Chen Ti	203	6
GBR	Brydan Klein	205	7
IND	Yuki Bhambri	216	8

- ^{1} Rankings are as of April 27, 2015.

=== Other entrants ===
The following players received wildcards into the singles main draw:

- (Kazakhstan) Sagadat Ayap
- (Uzbekistan) Sanjar Fayziev
- (Uzbekistan) Temur Ismailov
- (Uzbekistan) Jurabek Karimov

The following players received entry from the qualifying draw:

- (Belarus) Yaraslav Shyla
- (Belarus) Sergey Betov
- (Russia) Denis Matsukevich
- (Italy) Riccardo Ghedin

The following player received entry as a lucky loser:

- (Russia) Ivan Gakhov

== Doubles main-draw entrants ==
=== Seeds ===
Country	Player	Country	Player	Rank^{1}	Seed
BLR	Aliaksandr Bury	RUS	Teymuraz Gabashvili	214	1
BLR	Sergey Betov	RUS	Mikhail Elgin	307	2
IND	Saketh Myneni	IND	Divij Sharan	316	3
ITA	Riccardo Ghedin	IND	Ramkumar Ramanathan	415	4

- ^{1} Rankings as of April 27, 2015.

=== Other entrants ===
The following pairs received wildcards into the doubles main draw:

- (Uzbekistan) Sanjar Fayziev / (Uzbekistan) Jurabek Karimov
- (Uzbekistan) Temur Ismailov / (Uzbekistan) Shonigmatjon Shofayziyev
- (Kazakhstan) Sagadat Ayap / (Kazakhstan) Timur Khabibulin

== Champions ==
=== Singles ===
- (Russia) Teymuraz Gabashvili def. (Russia) Evgeny Donskoy, 5–2 retired

=== Doubles ===
- (India) Yuki Bhambri / (Spain) Adrián Menéndez Maceiras def. (Belarus) Sergey Betov / (Russia) Mikhail Elgin, 5–7, 6–3, [10–8]
