= 2014 Karshi Challenger =

- Date: 19–24 May
- Edition: 8th
- Draw: 32S / 16D
- Prize money: $50,000
- Surface: Hard
- Location: Qarshi, Uzbekistan

Champions

Singles
- (Georgia (country)) Nikoloz Basilashvili

Doubles
- (Belarus) Sergey Betov / (Belarus) Aliaksandr Bury
← 2013 ·	Karshi Challenger	· 2015 →

The 2014 Karshi Challenger was a professional tennis tournament played on hard courts. It was the eighth edition of the tournament which was part of the 2014 ATP Challenger Tour. It took place in Qarshi, Uzbekistan between 19 and 24 May 2014.

== Singles main-draw entrants ==
=== Seeds ===
Country	Player	Rank^{1}	Seed
RUS	Alexander Kudryavtsev	189	1
CAN	Filip Peliwo	223	2
RUS	Konstantin Kravchuk	259	3
JPN	Yasutaka Uchiyama	263	4
USA	Chase Buchanan	265	5
TPE	Huang Liang-chi	276	6
JPN	Shuichi Sekiguchi	281	7
SRB	Peđa Krstin	282	8

- ^{1} Rankings are as of May 12, 2014.

=== Other entrants ===
The following players received wildcards into the singles main draw:

- (Russia) Karen Khachanov
- (Uzbekistan) Shonigmatjon Shofayziyev
- (Uzbekistan) Sanjar Fayziev
- (Uzbekistan) Temur Ismailov

The following players received entry from the qualifying draw:

- (Ukraine) Denys Molchanov
- (Russia) Anton Zaitcev
- (Russia) Mikhail Ledovskikh
- (France) Laurent Rochette

== Doubles main-draw entrants ==
=== Seeds ===
Country	Player	Country	Player	Rank^{1}	Seed
RUS	Victor Baluda	RUS	Konstantin Kravchuk	244	1
IND	Sriram Balaji	TPE	Chen Ti	338	2
IRL	James Cluskey	IND	Saketh Myneni	348	3
TPE	Huang Liang-chi	IND	Divij Sharan	353	4

- ^{1} Rankings as of May 12, 2014.

=== Other entrants ===
The following pairs received wildcards into the doubles main draw:

- (Uzbekistan) Shonigmatjon Shofayziyev / (Uzbekistan) Vaja Uzakov
- (Uzbekistan) Omad Boboqulov / (Uzbekistan) Mikhail Esipov
- (Uzbekistan) Sanjar Fayziev / (Uzbekistan) Temur Ismailov

== Champions ==
=== Singles ===
- (Georgia (country)) Nikoloz Basilashvili def. (United States) Chase Buchanan, 7–6^{(7–2)}, 6–2

=== Doubles ===
- (Belarus) Sergey Betov / (Belarus) Aliaksandr Bury def. (China) Gong Maoxin / (Chinese Taipei) Peng Hsien-yin, 7–5, 1–6, [10–6]
