= 2017 Karshi Challenger – Doubles =

Doubles
- 2017 Karshi Challenger

Final
- Champions: (Ukraine) Denys Molchanov (Ukraine) Sergiy Stakhovsky
- Runners-up: (Germany) Kevin Krawietz (Spain) Adrián Menéndez-Maceiras
- Score: 6–4, 7–6^{(9–7)}

Events
Singles	Doubles
- Karshi Challenger

Enrique López-Pérez and Jeevan Nedunchezhiyan were the defending champions but chose not to defend their title.

Denys Molchanov and Sergiy Stakhovsky won the title after defeating Kevin Krawietz and Adrián Menéndez-Maceiras 6–4, 7–6^{(9–7)} in the final.

== Seeds ==
1. (Chile) Hans Podlipnik-Castillo / (Belarus) Andrei Vasilevski (semifinals)
2. (Russia) Mikhail Elgin / (Russia) Alexander Kudryavtsev (semifinals)
3. (Germany) Kevin Krawietz / (Spain) Adrián Menéndez-Maceiras (final)
4. (Belarus) Sergey Betov / (Belarus) Yaraslav Shyla (quarterfinals)

== Draw ==
Key

- Q = Qualifier
- WC = Wild card
- LL = Lucky loser
- Alt = Alternate
- ITF = ITF entry
- PR = Protected ranking
- SR = Special ranking
- SE = Special exempt
- JE = Junior exempt
- JR = Junior Accelerator Programme entrant
- CO = College Accelerator Programme entrant
- NG = Next Gen Accelerator Program entrant
- w/o = Walkover
- r = Retired
- d = Defaulted

First round
1	(Chile) H Podlipnik-Castillo (Belarus) A Vasilevski	7^{9}	6
(Japan) T Matsui (India) R Ramanathan	6^{7}	3
(India) Y Bhambri (Chinese Taipei) J Jung	4	6	[4]
(Russia) A Karatsev (Bosnia and Herzegovina) A Šetkić	6	2	[10]
3	(Germany) K Krawietz (Spain) A Menéndez-Maceiras	6	6
WC	(Uzbekistan) F Dustov (Uzbekistan) Saida'Lo Saidkarimov	2	1
(Russia) T Gabashvili (Belarus) I Ivashka	7	6
(Kazakhstan) D Popko (Chinese Taipei) T-h Yang	5	4
(Ukraine) V Manafov (Kazakhstan) A Nedovyesov	4	2
(Ukraine) D Molchanov (Ukraine) S Stakhovsky	6	6
(India) S Balaji (India) V Vardhan	6^{8}	6^{8}
4	(Belarus) S Betov (Belarus) Y Shyla	7^{10}	7^{10}
WC	(Uzbekistan) T Ismailov (Russia) M Kalovelonis	6	4	[10]
Alt	(Kazakhstan) T Khabibulin (Russia) A Vatutin	4	6	[8]
(India) P Gunneswaran (Czech Republic) Marek Jaloviec	5	4
2	(Russia) M Elgin (Russia) A Kudryavtsev	7	6

Quarterfinals
1	(Chile) H Podlipnik-Castillo (Belarus) A Vasilevski	4	6	[13]
(Russia) A Karatsev (Bosnia and Herzegovina) A Šetkić	6	3	[11]
3	(Germany) K Krawietz (Spain) A Menéndez-Maceiras	7^{7}	6
(Russia) T Gabashvili (Belarus) I Ivashka	6^{5}	1
(Ukraine) D Molchanov (Ukraine) S Stakhovsky	7^{7}	6
4	(Belarus) S Betov (Belarus) Y Shyla	6^{4}	2
WC	(Uzbekistan) T Ismailov (Russia) M Kalovelonis	2	4
2	(Russia) M Elgin (Russia) A Kudryavtsev	6	6

Semifinals
1	(Chile) H Podlipnik-Castillo (Belarus) A Vasilevski	6^{4}	7^{7}	[2]
3	(Germany) K Krawietz (Spain) A Menéndez-Maceiras	7^{7}	6^{4}	[10]
(Ukraine) D Molchanov (Ukraine) S Stakhovsky	7^{7}	6
2	(Russia) M Elgin (Russia) A Kudryavtsev	6^{1}	4

Final
3	(Germany) K Krawietz (Spain) A Menéndez-Maceiras	4	6^{7}
(Ukraine) D Molchanov (Ukraine) S Stakhovsky	6	7^{9}
