= 2009 Karshi Challenger =

- Date: August 17 – August 23
- Edition: 3rd
- Location: Qarshi, Uzbekistan

Champions

Singles
- (Austria) Rainer Eitzinger

Doubles
- (Australia) Sadik Kadir / (India) Purav Raja
- Karshi Challenger

The 2009 Karshi Challenger was a professional tennis tournament played on outdoor hard courts. It was the third edition of the Karshi Challenger tournament which was part of the 2009 ATP Challenger Tour. It took place in Qarshi, Uzbekistan between 17 and 23 August 2009.

== Singles entrants ==
=== Seeds ===
Nationality	Player	Ranking*	Seeding
RUS	Michail Elgin	193	1
UKR	Illya Marchenko	202	2
SVK	Kamil Čapkovič	221	3
ESP	Carles Poch-Gradin	258	4
LAT	Andis Juška	270	5
UKR	Ivan Sergeyev	274	6
LAT	Deniss Pavlovs	297	7
RUS	Valery Rudnev	300	8

- Rankings are as of August 10, 2009.

=== Other entrants ===
The following players received wildcards into the singles main draw:

- (Uzbekistan) Rifat Biktyakov
- (Uzbekistan) Jakhongir Jalalov
- (Uzbekistan) Sergey Shipilov
- (Uzbekistan) Vaja Uzakov

The following players received entry from the qualifying draw:

- (Lithuania) Ričardas Berankis
- (Uzbekistan) Murad Inoyatov
- (Australia) Sadik Kadir
- (Russia) Mikhail Ledovskikh
- (Germany) Patrick Taubert (as a Lucky Loser)

== Champions ==
=== Singles ===
(Austria) Rainer Eitzinger def. (Ukraine) Ivan Sergeyev, 6–3, 1–6, 7–6(3)

=== Doubles ===
(Australia) Sadik Kadir / (India) Purav Raja def. (Latvia) Andis Juška / (Latvia) Deniss Pavlovs, 6–3, 7–6(4)
