= 2018 Karshi Challenger – Singles =

Singles
- 2018 Karshi Challenger

Final
- Champion: (Belarus) Egor Gerasimov
- Runner-up: (Belarus) Sergey Betov
- Score: 7–6^{(7–3)}, 2–0 ret.

Events
Singles	Doubles
← 2017 ·	Karshi Challenger

Egor Gerasimov was the defending champion and successfully defended his title.

Gerasimov won the title after Sergey Betov retired trailing 6–7^{(3–7)}, 0–2 in the final.

== Seeds ==
1. (Poland) Hubert Hurkacz (first round, retired)
2. (Serbia) Nikola Milojević (second round)
3. (Belarus) Egor Gerasimov (champion)
4. (Belarus) Uladzimir Ignatik (quarterfinals)
5. (Kazakhstan) Aleksandr Nedovyesov (second round, retired)
6. (South Africa) Lloyd Harris (quarterfinals)
7. (Bosnia and Herzegovina) Aldin Šetkić (second round)
8. (Chinese Taipei) Yang Tsung-hua (second round)

== Draw ==
=== Key ===
- Q = Qualifier
- WC = Wild card
- LL = Lucky loser
- Alt = Alternate
- SE = Special exempt
- PR = Protected ranking
- ITF = ITF entry
- JE = Junior exempt
- w/o = Walkover
- r = Retired
- d = Defaulted
- SR = Special ranking

=== Finals ===
Semifinals
(Spain) Carlos Boluda-Purkiss	6^{3}	1
Q	(Belarus) Sergey Betov	7^{7}	6
3	(Belarus) Egor Gerasimov	7^{7}	7^{7}
(Turkey) Cem İlkel	6^{4}	6^{4}

Final
Q	(Belarus) Sergey Betov	6^{3}	0^{r}
3	(Belarus) Egor Gerasimov	7^{7}	2

=== Top half ===
First round
1	(Poland) H Hurkacz	6^{6}	2^{r}
(Spain) M Vilella Martínez	7^{8}	5
(Russia) K Kravchuk	6^{3}	3
WC	(Uzbekistan) K Sultanov	7^{7}	6
(Russia) E Tyurnev	5	6	2
(Spain) Carlos Boluda-Purkiss	7	3	6
(Italy) A Bega	4	4
8	(Chinese Taipei) T-h Yang	6	6
4	(Belarus) U Ignatik	6	6
WC	(Uzbekistan) S Fomin	3	3
(Japan) K Uchida	1	6	6
(Japan) H Moriya	6	2	3
WC	(Uzbekistan) J Karimov	6^{4}	3
Q	(Belarus) S Betov	7^{7}	6
Q	(Japan) Shuichi Sekiguchi	1	5
7	(Bosnia and Herzegovina) A Šetkić	6	7

Second round
(Spain) M Vilella Martínez	1	5
WC	(Uzbekistan) K Sultanov	6	7
(Spain) C Boluda-Purkiss	6	5	7^{9}
8	(Chinese Taipei) T-h Yang	4	7	6^{7}
4	(Belarus) U Ignatik	6	6
(Japan) K Uchida	3	3
Q	(Belarus) S Betov	6	4	7^{7}
7	(Bosnia and Herzegovina) A Šetkić	4	6	6^{4}

Quarterfinals
WC	(Uzbekistan) K Sultanov	6^{3}	4
(Spain) C Boluda-Purkiss	7^{7}	6
4	(Belarus) U Ignatik	3	6^{1}
Q	(Belarus) S Betov	6	7^{7}

Semifinals
(Spain) C Boluda-Purkiss	6^{3}	1
Q	(Belarus) S Betov	7^{7}	6

=== Bottom half ===
First round
6	(South Africa) L Harris	7^{7}	1	6
(Russia) I Gakhov	6^{5}	6	3
(Spain) R Ortega Olmedo	7^{7}	6
Q	(France) T Lamasine	6^{3}	4
(Russia) T Gabashvili	6	6
(United States) JC Aragone	2	4
WC	(Uzbekistan) F Dustov	3	4
3	(Belarus) E Gerasimov	6	6
5	(Kazakhstan) A Nedovyesov	7^{7}	7
(Italy) A Basso	6^{5}	5
(Turkey) C İlkel	6	7^{7}
(United States) Jared Hiltzik	2	6^{4}
(Uzbekistan) S Fayziev	6	2	6^{4}
Q	(India) S Mukund	4	6	7^{7}
(Russia) R Safiullin	4	2
2	(Serbia) N Milojević	6	6

Second round
6	(South Africa) L Harris	3	7^{7}	6
(Spain) R Ortega Olmedo	6	6^{4}	3
(Russia) T Gabashvili	4	6^{5}
3	(Belarus) E Gerasimov	6	7^{7}
5	(Kazakhstan) A Nedovyesov	6	3	0^{r}
(Turkey) C İlkel	3	6	4
Q	(India) S Mukund	6	0	6
2	(Serbia) N Milojević	3	6	2

Quarterfinals
6	(South Africa) L Harris	1	6	3
3	(Belarus) E Gerasimov	6	3	6
(Turkey) C İlkel	3	6	6
Q	(India) S Mukund	6	2	3

Semifinals
3	(Belarus) E Gerasimov	7^{7}	7^{7}
(Turkey) C İlkel	6^{4}	6^{4}
