= 2018 Karshi Challenger – Doubles =

Doubles
- 2018 Karshi Challenger

Final
- Champions: (Kazakhstan) Timur Khabibulin (Ukraine) Vladyslav Manafov
- Runners-up: (Uzbekistan) Sanjar Fayziev (Uzbekistan) Jurabek Karimov
- Score: 6–2, 6–1

Events
Singles	Doubles
- Karshi Challenger

Denys Molchanov and Sergiy Stakhovsky were the defending champions but chose not to defend their title.

Timur Khabibulin and Vladyslav Manafov won the title after defeating Sanjar Fayziev and Jurabek Karimov 6–2, 6–1 in the final.

== Seeds ==
1. (India) Sriram Balaji / (India) Vishnu Vardhan (quarterfinals)
2. (Kazakhstan) Timur Khabibulin / (Ukraine) Vladyslav Manafov (champions)
3. (Serbia) Nikola Čačić / (Switzerland) Luca Margaroli (first round)
4. (India) Saketh Myneni / (India) Vijay Sundar Prashanth (first round)

== Draw ==
Key

- Q = Qualifier
- WC = Wild card
- LL = Lucky loser
- Alt = Alternate
- ITF = ITF entry
- PR = Protected ranking
- SR = Special ranking
- SE = Special exempt
- JE = Junior exempt
- JR = Junior Accelerator Programme entrant
- CO = College Accelerator Programme entrant
- NG = Next Gen Accelerator Program entrant
- w/o = Walkover
- r = Retired
- d = Defaulted

First round
1	(India) S Balaji (India) V Vardhan	6	7
(Russia) M Elgin (Kazakhstan) A Nedovyesov	3	5
(Turkey) A Çelikbilek (Turkey) C İlkel	6	6
WC	(Uzbekistan) F Dustov (Uzbekistan) Shonigmatjon Shofayziyev	4	3
4	(India) S Myneni (India) VS Prashanth	2	6^{3}
(Belarus) Y Shyla (Chinese Taipei) T-h Yang	6	7^{7}
WC	(Uzbekistan) S Fayziev (Uzbekistan) J Karimov	6	6
(Belarus) S Betov (France) T Lamasine	4	4
(Belarus) U Ignatik (Russia) A Pavlioutchenkov	7^{7}	7^{7}
(Russia) I Gakhov (Russia) E Tyurnev	6^{1}	6^{2}
Alt	(United States) JC Aragone (South Africa) L Harris	6	4	[12]
3	(Serbia) N Čačić (Switzerland) L Margaroli	3	6	[10]
WC	(Uzbekistan) S Fomin (Uzbekistan) K Sultanov	6^{4}	6	[10]
(Spain) Carlos Boluda-Purkiss (Spain) R Ortega Olmedo	7^{7}	2	[6]
(Serbia) N Milojević (Bosnia and Herzegovina) A Šetkić	6^{5}	6^{5}
2	(Kazakhstan) T Khabibulin (Ukraine) V Manafov	7^{7}	7^{7}

Quarterfinals
1	(India) S Balaji (India) V Vardhan	4	6^{7}
(Turkey) A Çelikbilek (Turkey) C İlkel	6	7^{9}
(Belarus) Y Shyla (Chinese Taipei) T-h Yang	2	4
WC	(Uzbekistan) S Fayziev (Uzbekistan) J Karimov	6	6
(Belarus) U Ignatik (Russia) A Pavlioutchenkov	4	3
Alt	(United States) JC Aragone (South Africa) L Harris	6	6
WC	(Uzbekistan) S Fomin (Uzbekistan) K Sultanov	6^{3}	1
2	(Kazakhstan) T Khabibulin (Ukraine) V Manafov	7^{7}	6

Semifinals
(Turkey) A Çelikbilek (Turkey) C İlkel	2	3
WC	(Uzbekistan) S Fayziev (Uzbekistan) J Karimov	6	6
Alt	(United States) JC Aragone (South Africa) L Harris	6^{7}	3
2	(Kazakhstan) T Khabibulin (Ukraine) V Manafov	7^{9}	6

Final
WC	(Uzbekistan) S Fayziev (Uzbekistan) J Karimov	2	1
2	(Kazakhstan) T Khabibulin (Ukraine) V Manafov	6	6
