= 2011 Karshi Challenger =

- Date: 15–21 August
- Edition: 5th
- Location: Qarshi, Uzbekistan

Champions

Singles
- (Uzbekistan) Denis Istomin

Doubles
- (Russia) Mikhail Elgin / (Russia) Alexander Kudryavtsev
← 2010 ·	Karshi Challenger	· 2012 →

The 2011 Karshi Challenger was a professional tennis tournament played on hard courts. It was the fifth edition of the tournament which was part of the 2011 ATP Challenger Tour. It took place in Qarshi, Uzbekistan between 15 and 21 August 2011.

== ATP entrants ==
=== Seeds ===
Country	Player	Rank^{1}	Seed
SVN	Blaž Kavčič	74	1
UZB	Denis Istomin	81	2
RUS	Konstantin Kravchuk	162	3
RUS	Alexander Kudryavtsev	165	4
SVK	Andrej Martin	191	5
TPE	Yang Tsung-hua	209	6
UZB	Farrukh Dustov	237	7
SVK	Ivo Klec	243	8

- ^{1} Rankings are as of August 8, 2011.

=== Other entrants ===
The following players received wildcards into the singles main draw:

- (Uzbekistan) Farrukh Dustov
- (Uzbekistan) Murad Inoyatov
- (Indonesia) Christopher Rungkat
- (Uzbekistan) Nigmat Shofayziev

The following players received entry as a special exemption into the singles main draw:

- (Uzbekistan) Denis Istomin

The following players received entry from the qualifying draw:

- (Russia) Mikhail Elgin
- (Uzbekistan) Sarvar Ikramov
- (Russia) Mikhail Ledovskikh
- (Austria) Gerald Melzer

The following players received entry from the qualifying draw as a lucky loser:

- (Japan) Junn Mitsuhashi

== Champions ==
=== Singles ===
(Uzbekistan) Denis Istomin def. (Slovenia) Blaž Kavčič, 6–3, 1–6, 6–1

=== Doubles ===
(Russia) Mikhail Elgin / (Russia) Alexander Kudryavtsev def. (Russia) Konstantin Kravchuk / (Ukraine) Denys Molchanov, 3–6, 6–3, [11–9]
