= 2013 Karshi Challenger – Doubles =

Doubles
- 2013 Karshi Challenger

Final
- Champions: (Chinese Taipei) Chen Ti (Spain) Guillermo Olaso
- Runners-up: (Australia) Jordan Kerr (Russia) Konstantin Kravchuk
- Score: 7–6^{(7–5)}, 7–5

Events
Singles	Doubles
- Karshi Challenger

The defending champions were Lee Hsin-han and Peng Hsien-yin, but they chose not to compete.
Chen Ti and Guillermo Olaso defeated Jordan Kerr and Konstantin Kravchuk 7–6^{(7–5)}, 7–5 in the final to win the title.

== Seeds ==
1. (United States) James Cerretani / (Canada) Adil Shamasdin (first round)
2. (Australia) Jordan Kerr / (Russia) Konstantin Kravchuk (final)
3. (Moldova) Radu Albot / (Ukraine) Oleksandr Nedovyesov (semifinals)
4. (Russia) Teymuraz Gabashvili / (Israel) Amir Weintraub (semifinals)

== Draw ==
Key

- Q = Qualifier
- WC = Wild card
- LL = Lucky loser
- Alt = Alternate
- ITF = ITF entry
- PR = Protected ranking
- SR = Special ranking
- SE = Special exempt
- JE = Junior exempt
- JR = Junior Accelerator Programme entrant
- CO = College Accelerator Programme entrant
- NG = Next Gen Accelerator Program entrant
- w/o = Walkover
- r = Retired
- d = Defaulted

=== Draw ===
First round
1	(United States) J Cerretani (Canada) A Shamasdin	6	6^{5}	[2]
(Chinese Taipei) T Chen (Spain) G Olaso	3	7^{7}	[10]
(Belarus) A Bury (Belarus) A Vasilevski	6	6
(Russia) Alexander Lobkov (Russia) D Matsukevitch	2	4
4	(Russia) T Gabashvili (Israel) A Weintraub	6	6
WC	(Uzbekistan) Omad Boboqulov (Uzbekistan) Pavel Tsoy	2	0
(Russia) M Elgin (Russia) A Kudryavtsev	7^{7}	7
(United States) Adham El-Effendi (United Kingdom) D Walsh	6^{5}	5
WC	(Uzbekistan) S Fayziev (Uzbekistan) Nigmat Shofayziev	4	4
(India) P Amritraj (India) V Vardhan	6	6
(Czech Republic) J Mertl (Slovakia) Adrian Sikora	6	3	[5]
3	(Moldova) R Albot (Ukraine) O Nedovyesov	2	6	[10]
(Croatia) T Androić (Croatia) D Marcan	5	4
(France) Antoine Benneteau (New Zealand) M Venus	7	6
WC	(Uzbekistan) S Ikramov (Uzbekistan) Batyr Sapaev	1	3
2	(Australia) J Kerr (Russia) K Kravchuk	6	6

Quarterfinals
(Chinese Taipei) T Chen (Spain) G Olaso	6	6
(Belarus) A Bury (Belarus) A Vasilevski	4	4
4	(Russia) T Gabashvili (Israel) A Weintraub	6	4	[10]
(Russia) M Elgin (Russia) A Kudryavtsev	2	6	[3]
(India) P Amritraj (India) V Vardhan	2	0
3	(Moldova) R Albot (Ukraine) O Nedovyesov	6	6
(France) A Benneteau (New Zealand) M Venus	2	6	[4]
2	(Australia) J Kerr (Russia) K Kravchuk	6	2	[10]

Semifinals
(Chinese Taipei) T Chen (Spain) G Olaso	6	6
4	(Russia) T Gabashvili (Israel) A Weintraub	3	0
3	(Moldova) R Albot (Ukraine) O Nedovyesov	5	6^{0}
2	(Australia) J Kerr (Russia) K Kravchuk	7	7^{7}

Final
(Chinese Taipei) T Chen (Spain) G Olaso	7^{7}	7
2	(Australia) J Kerr (Russia) K Kravchuk	6^{5}	5
