= 2018 Karshi Challenger =

- Date: 7–12 May
- Edition: 12th
- Draw: 32S / 16D
- Surface: Hard
- Location: Qarshi, Uzbekistan

Champions

Singles
- (Belarus) Egor Gerasimov

Doubles
- (Kazakhstan) Timur Khabibulin / (Ukraine) Vladyslav Manafov
← 2017 ·	Karshi Challenger

The 2018 Karshi Challenger was a professional tennis tournament played on hard courts. It was the twelfth edition of the tournament which was part of the 2018 ATP Challenger Tour. It took place in Qarshi, Uzbekistan between 7 and 12 May 2018.

== Singles main-draw entrants ==
=== Seeds ===
Country	Player	Rank^{1}	Seed
POL	Hubert Hurkacz	178	1
SRB	Nikola Milojević	208	2
BLR	Egor Gerasimov	224	3
BLR	Uladzimir Ignatik	226	4
KAZ	Aleksandr Nedovyesov	228	5
RSA	Lloyd Harris	232	6
BIH	Aldin Šetkić	245	7
TPE	Yang Tsung-hua	249	8

- ^{1} Rankings as of 30 April 2018.

=== Other entrants ===
The following players received wildcards into the singles main draw:

- (Uzbekistan) Farrukh Dustov
- (Uzbekistan) Sergey Fomin
- (Uzbekistan) Jurabek Karimov
- (Uzbekistan) Khumoyun Sultanov

The following players received entry from the qualifying draw:

- (Belarus) Sergey Betov
- (France) Tristan Lamasine
- (India) Sasikumar Mukund
- (Japan) Shuichi Sekiguchi

== Champions ==
=== Singles ===
- (Belarus) Egor Gerasimov def. (Belarus) Sergey Betov 7–6^{(7–3)}, 2–0 ret.

=== Doubles ===
- (Kazakhstan) Timur Khabibulin / (Ukraine) Vladyslav Manafov def. (Uzbekistan) Sanjar Fayziev / (Uzbekistan) Jurabek Karimov 6–2, 6–1.
