= 2012 Karshi Challenger – Doubles =

Doubles
- 2012 Karshi Challenger

Final
- Champions: (Chinese Taipei) Lee Hsin-han (Chinese Taipei) Peng Hsien-yin
- Runners-up: (Australia) Brydan Klein (Japan) Yasutaka Uchiyama
- Score: 6–7^{(5–7)}, 6–4, [10–4]

Events
Singles	Doubles
- Karshi Challenger

Michail Elgin and Alexandre Kudryavtsev were the defending champions, but decided not to participate.
Third seeds Lee Hsin-han and Peng Hsien-Yin won the title by defeating Brydan Klein and Yasutaka Uchiyama 6–7^{(5–7)}, 6–4, [10–4] in the final.

== Seeds ==
1. (Thailand) Sanchai Ratiwatana / (Thailand) Sonchat Ratiwatana (first round)
2. (India) Divij Sharan / (India) Vishnu Vardhan (semifinals)
3. (Chinese Taipei) Lee Hsin-han / (Chinese Taipei) Peng Hsien-yin (champions)
4. (Australia) Brydan Klein / (Japan) Yasutaka Uchiyama (final)

== Draw ==
Key

- Q = Qualifier
- WC = Wild card
- LL = Lucky loser
- Alt = Alternate
- ITF = ITF entry
- PR = Protected ranking
- SR = Special ranking
- SE = Special exempt
- JE = Junior exempt
- JR = Junior Accelerator Programme entrant
- CO = College Accelerator Programme entrant
- NG = Next Gen Accelerator Program entrant
- w/o = Walkover
- r = Retired
- d = Defaulted

=== Draw ===
First round
1	(Thailand) Sa Ratiwatana (Thailand) So Ratiwatana	4	4
(Italy) R Bellotti (Austria) G Melzer	6	6
WC	(Uzbekistan) Nigmat Shofayziev (Uzbekistan) Vaja Uzakov	2	2
(Slovakia) K Čapkovič (Czech Republic) Michal Konečný	6	6
4	(Australia) B Klein (Japan) Y Uchiyama	6	6
WC	(Uzbekistan) Sanjar Fayziev (Uzbekistan) S Ikramov	3	4
(Ukraine) O Nedovyesov (Ukraine) I Sergeyev	6	6
(Argentina) Nicolás Pastor (China) D Wu	4	2
(Thailand) W Doakmaiklee (Belarus) D Zhyrmont	6	6
WC	(Uzbekistan) Omad Boboqulov (Uzbekistan) Batyr Sapaev	4	0
(Slovakia) Norbert Gomboš (Chile) H Podlipnik-Castillo	3	4
3	(Chinese Taipei) H-h Lee (Chinese Taipei) Peng H-y	6	6
(Chinese Taipei) T Chen (Russia) D Matsukevich	4	7^{11}	[7]
(Russia) Sergei Krotiouk (Indonesia) C Rungkat	6	6^{8}	[10]
(Slovakia) A Martin (Slovakia) Adrian Sikora	3	4
2	(India) D Sharan (India) V Vardhan	6	6

Quarterfinals
(Italy) R Bellotti (Austria) G Melzer	7^{8}	1	[4]
(Slovakia) K Čapkovič (Czech Republic) M Konečný	6^{6}	6	[10]
4	(Australia) B Klein (Japan) Y Uchiyama	6	7
(Ukraine) O Nedovyesov (Ukraine) I Sergeyev	3	5
(Thailand) W Doakmaiklee (Belarus) D Zhyrmont	6^{3}	6	4
3	(Chinese Taipei) H-h Lee (Chinese Taipei) Peng H-y	7^{7}	4	[10]
(Russia) S Krotiouk (Indonesia) C Rungkat	2	3
2	(India) D Sharan (India) V Vardhan	6	6

Semifinals
(Slovakia) K Čapkovič (Czech Republic) M Konečný	6	1	[1]
4	(Australia) B Klein (Japan) Y Uchiyama	2	6	[10]
3	(Chinese Taipei) H-h Lee (Chinese Taipei) Peng H-y	6	6^{2}	[10]
2	(India) D Sharan (India) V Vardhan	4	7^{7}	[8]

Final
4	(Australia) B Klein (Japan) Y Uchiyama	7^{7}	4	[4]
3	(Chinese Taipei) H-h Lee (Chinese Taipei) Peng H-y	6^{5}	6	[10]
