= 2016 Karshi Challenger =

- Date: 2–7 May
- Edition: 10th
- Draw: 32S / 16D
- Prize money: $50,000+H
- Surface: Hard
- Location: Qarshi, Uzbekistan

Champions

Singles
- (Serbia) Marko Tepavac

Doubles
- (Spain) Enrique López Pérez / (India) Jeevan Nedunchezhiyan
- Karshi Challenger

The 2016 Karshi Challenger was a professional tennis tournament played on hard courts. It was the tenth edition of the tournament which was part of the 2016 ATP Challenger Tour. It took place in Qarshi, Uzbekistan between 2 and 7 May 2016.

== Singles main-draw entrants ==
=== Seeds ===
Country	Player	Rank^{1}	Seed
ISR	Dudi Sela	78	1
RUS	Karen Khachanov	128	2
MDA	Radu Albot	151	3
KAZ	Aleksandr Nedovyesov	197	4
ISR	Amir Weintraub	198	5
UKR	Denys Molchanov	224	6
KAZ	Dmitry Popko	230	7
RUS	Aslan Karatsev	216	8

- ^{1} Rankings as of April 25, 2016.

=== Other entrants ===
The following players received wildcards into the singles main draw:

- (Uzbekistan) Pavel Tsoy
- (Uzbekistan) Sanjar Fayziev
- (Uzbekistan) Temur Ismailov
- (Uzbekistan) Shonigmatjon Shofayziyev

The following players received entry from the qualifying draw:

- (Belarus) Sergey Betov
- (Russia) Denis Matsukevich
- (Italy) Francesco Vilardo
- (Russia) Richard Muzaev

The following player received entry as a lucky loser:

- (Republic of Ireland) Sam Barry

== Champions ==
=== Singles ===
- (Serbia) Marko Tepavac def. (Israel) Dudi Sela, 2–6, 6–3, 7–6^{(7–4)}

=== Doubles ===
- (Spain) Enrique López Pérez / (India) Jeevan Nedunchezhiyan def. (Georgia (country)) Aleksandre Metreveli / (Kazakhstan) Dmitry Popko, 6–1, 6–4
