= 2012 Karshi Challenger – Singles =

Singles
- 2012 Karshi Challenger

Final
- Champion: (Russia) Igor Kunitsyn
- Runner-up: (Belarus) Dzmitry Zhyrmont
- Score: 7–6^{(12–10)}, 6–2

Events
Singles	Doubles
- Karshi Challenger

Denis Istomin was the defending champion, but chose not to compete.
Igor Kunitsyn won the title, defeating Dzmitry Zhyrmont 7–6^{(12–10)}, 6–2 in the final.

== Seeds ==
1. (Russia) Igor Kunitsyn (champion)
2. (Serbia) Dušan Lajović (quarterfinals)
3. (Russia) Konstantin Kravchuk (second round)
4. (China) Wu Di (semifinals)
5. (Ukraine) Ivan Sergeyev (semifinals)
6. (Ukraine) Illya Marchenko (first round)
7. (Slovakia) Kamil Čapkovič (quarterfinals)
8. (Australia) Brydan Klein (first round)

== Draw ==
Key

- Q = Qualifier
- WC = Wild card
- LL = Lucky loser
- Alt = Alternate
- ITF = ITF entry
- PR = Protected ranking
- SR = Special ranking
- SE = Special exempt
- JE = Junior exempt
- JR = Junior Accelerator Programme entrant
- CO = College Accelerator Programme entrant
- NG = Next Gen Accelerator Program entrant
- w/o = Walkover
- r = Retired
- d = Defaulted

=== Finals ===
Semifinals
1	(Russia) Igor Kunitsyn	6	6
5	(Ukraine) Ivan Sergeyev	3	1
4	(China) Wu Di	6	2	1
Q	(Belarus) Dzmitry Zhyrmont	3	6	6

Final
1	(Russia) Igor Kunitsyn	7^{12}	6
Q	(Belarus) Dzmitry Zhyrmont	6^{10}	2

=== Top half ===
First round
1	(Russia) I Kunitsyn	6	6
WC	(Uzbekistan) S Ikramov	1	4
(Uzbekistan) F Dustov	6	1	0
(Ukraine) O Nedovyesov	4	6	6
(Canada) S Diez	6	7^{10}
(Uzbekistan) Nigmat Shofayziev	0	6^{8}
LL	(Germany) Jaan-Frederik Brunken	6^{6}	6	6
8	(Australia) B Klein	7^{8}	2	0
3	(Russia) K Kravchuk	6	6
Q	(India) N S Balaji	3	1
(India) V Vardhan	6	6
(Czech Republic) Michal Konečný	4	1
(Chinese Taipei) T Chen	2	1
(Indonesia) C Rungkat	6	6
(Slovakia) A Martin	6^{2}	1
5	(Ukraine) I Sergeyev	7^{7}	6

Second round
1	(Russia) I Kunitsyn	7^{7}	6
(Ukraine) O Nedovyesov	6^{2}	4
(Canada) S Diez	7^{7}	7
LL	(Germany) J-F Brunken	6^{4}	5
3	(Russia) K Kravchuk	3	6^{5}
(India) V Vardhan	6	7^{7}
(Indonesia) C Rungkat	4	4
5	(Ukraine) I Sergeyev	6	6

Quarterfinals
1	(Russia) I Kunitsyn	6	6
(Canada) S Diez	3	4
(India) V Vardhan	6^{6}	5
5	(Ukraine) I Sergeyev	7^{8}	7

Semifinals
1	(Russia) I Kunitsyn	6	6
5	(Ukraine) I Sergeyev	3	1

=== Bottom half ===
First round
7	(Slovakia) K Čapkovič	7	6
WC	(Uzbekistan) Temur Ismailov	5	1
(Slovakia) Norbert Gomboš	2	6	7^{9}
(Chile) H Podlipnik-Castillo	6	2	6^{7}
(Italy) R Bellotti	6	3
(Argentina) Nicolás Pastor	0	0^{r}
WC	(Uzbekistan) Sergey Shipilov	0	2
4	(China) D Wu	6	6
6	(Ukraine) I Marchenko	6	5	4
Q	(Belarus) D Zhyrmont	2	7	6
Q	(Russia) D Matsukevich	6	6
(Sweden) E Eleskovic	3	1
(Austria) G Melzer	6	6
(Japan) Y Uchiyama	4	4
Q	(Slovakia) Adrian Sikora	6^{3}	4
2	(Serbia) D Lajović	7^{7}	6

Second round
7	(Slovakia) K Čapkovič	7^{11}	2	6
(Slovakia) N Gomboš	6^{9}	6	2
(Italy) R Bellotti	6	2	5
4	(China) D Wu	4	6	7
Q	(Belarus) D Zhyrmont	6^{5}	6	5
Q	(Russia) D Matsukevich	7^{7}	2	2^{r}
(Austria) G Melzer	5	3
2	(Serbia) D Lajović	7	6

Quarterfinals
7	(Slovakia) K Čapkovič	2	6	3
4	(China) D Wu	6	3	6
Q	(Belarus) D Zhyrmont	6	6
2	(Serbia) D Lajović	3	2

Semifinals
4	(China) D Wu	6	2	1
Q	(Belarus) D Zhyrmont	3	6	6
