= 2012 Karshi Challenger =

Professional tennis tournament

- Date: 13–19 August
- Edition: 6th
- Location: Qarshi, Uzbekistan

Champions

Singles
- (Russia) Igor Kunitsyn

Doubles
- (Chinese Taipei) Hsin-han Lee / (Chinese Taipei) Peng Hsien-yin
- Karshi Challenger

The 2012 Karshi Challenger was a professional tennis tournament played on hard courts. It was the sixth edition of the tournament which was part of the 2012 ATP Challenger Tour. It took place in Qarshi, Uzbekistan between 13 and 19 August 2012.

== Singles main-draw entrants ==
=== Seeds ===
Country	Player	Rank^{1}	Seed
RUS	Igor Kunitsyn	144	1
SRB	Dušan Lajović	168	2
RUS	Konstantin Kravchuk	207	3
CHN	Wu Di	224	4
UKR	Ivan Sergeyev	232	5
UKR	Illya Marchenko	235	6
SVK	Kamil Čapkovič	237	7
AUS	Brydan Klein	239	8

- ^{1} Rankings are as of August 6, 2012.

=== Other entrants ===
The following players received wildcards into the singles main draw:

- (Uzbekistan) Sarvar Ikramov
- (Uzbekistan) Temur Ismailov
- (Uzbekistan) Sergey Shipilov
- (Uzbekistan) Nigmat Shofayziev

The following players received entry from the qualifying draw:

- (India) Sriram Balaji
- (Russia) Denis Matsukevich
- (Slovakia) Adrian Sikora
- (Belarus) Dzmitry Zhyrmont

== Champions ==
=== Singles ===
- (Russia) Igor Kunitsyn def. (Belarus) Dzmitry Zhyrmont, 7–6^{(12–10)}, 6–2

=== Doubles ===
- (Chinese Taipei) Hsin-han Lee / (Chinese Taipei) Peng Hsien-Yin def. (Australia) Brydan Klein / (Japan) Yasutaka Uchiyama 6–7^{(5–7)}, 6–4, [10–4]
