= Egor Gerasimov =

Belarusian tennis player (born 1992)

Yegor Gerasimov Ягор Герасімаў
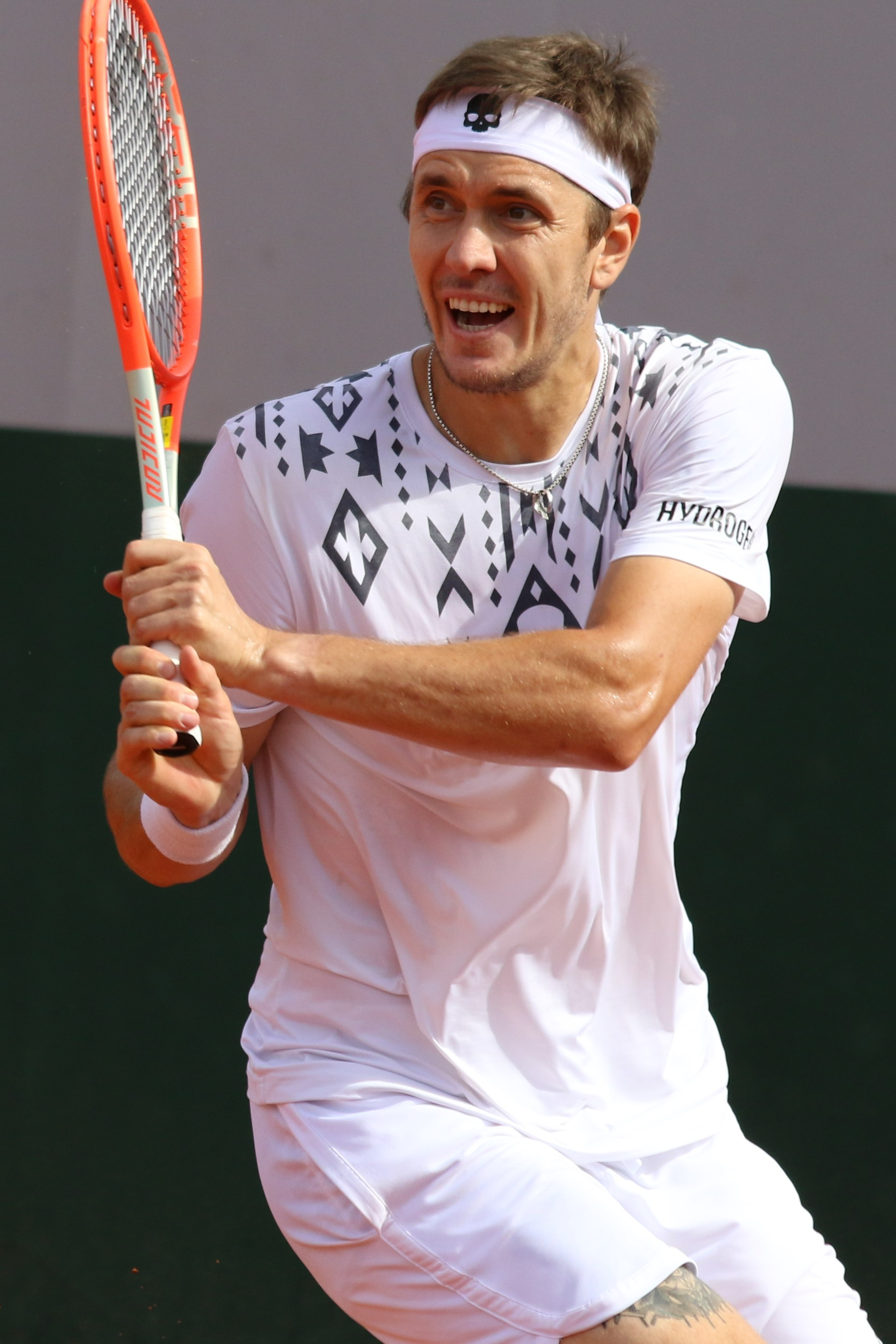
- Gerasimov at the 2022 French Open
- Country (sports): Belarus
- Residence: Minsk, Belarus
- Born: 11 November 1992 (age 33) Minsk, Belarus
- Height: 1.96 m (6 ft 5 in)
- Turned pro: 2010
- Retired: 3 May 2026
- Plays: Right-handed (two-handed backhand)
- Prize money: US $2,109,708

Singles
- Career record: 63–60
- Career titles: 0
- Highest ranking: No. 65 (24 February 2020)

Grand Slam singles results
- Australian Open: 2R (2020, 2021)
- French Open: 1R (2020, 2021)
- Wimbledon: 2R (2021)
- US Open: 2R (2019, 2020)

Other tournaments
- Olympic Games: 2R (2021)

Doubles
- Career record: 2–7
- Career titles: 0
- Highest ranking: No. 263 (2 March 2015)

Grand Slam doubles results
- Wimbledon: 1R (2021)

Other doubles tournaments
- Olympic Games: 1R (2021)

Team competitions
- Davis Cup: 19–8
- Last updated on: 18 May 2026.

Yegor Alekseyevich Gerasimov (Russian: Егор Алексеевич Герасимов) or Yahor Alyakseyevich Herasimaŭ (Belarusian: Ягор Аляксеевіч Герасімаў; born 11 November 1992 in Minsk) is a Belarusian former professional tennis player. He has a career high ATP singles ranking of world No. 65, which he achieved on 24 February 2020. He also achieved a career high ATP doubles ranking of No. 263 on 2 March 2015.

== Professional career ==
=== 2014: ATP debut ===
In 2014, Gerasimov made his ATP main draw debut in Shenzhen, where he received entry to the main draw as a wildcard entrant.

=== 2017-2018: ATP Challenger success ===
In May 2017 Gerasimov won the Karshi Challenger defeating Yuki Bhambri in the semifinals and Cem İlkel in the final.

In July 2018, Gerasimov recorded his first ATP match victory on the hardcourts of Los Cabos, defeating Bernard Tomic 6-4 6–3. He also beat the experienced big server Sam Querrey before facing defeat against world No. 4 Juan Martín del Potro.

=== 2019-2020: Major debut and first win, Top 100, Maiden ATP final ===
At the 2019 US Open, Gerasimov won his first Grand Slam match, defeating Lloyd Harris 7-5 7-6 7–6, having progressed through the qualifying rounds. His good form continued in St. Petersburg, where he advanced through qualifying to his first ATP semifinal. He finally lost a close match to world No. 4 and home favourite Daniil Medvedev in straight sets. This result catapulted Gerasimov into the top 100 at world No. 98 for the first time on 23 September 2019.

He reached his maiden ATP final at the 2020 Maharashtra Open where he was defeated by Jiří Veselý. Two weeks later, he reached a career-high singles ranking of No. 65 on 24 February 2020.

=== 2021: ATP semifinal ===
Gerasimov made a strong start to the year, reaching the semifinals in Montpellier. He defeated wildcard, former world No. 1 Andy Murray in straight sets, Aljaž Bedene and Alejandro Davidovich Fokina before losing to eventual champion David Goffin in the semifinals.

=== 2022-2024: Hiatus, back to Tour, top 300 and Masters level ===
He entered the 2023 Australian Open, the 2023 French Open, the 2023 Wimbledon Championships and the 2023 US Open qualifying using protected ranking where he lost in all, in the first round.

He also entered the qualifying competitions at the 2023 Chengdu Open and at the 2023 Astana Open using protected ranking. At the latter he qualified for his first ATP main draw in 2023 and he also received a wildcard in doubles with Mikhail Kukushkin. He won his first ATP match for the season and since April 2022, defeating Bernabe Zapata Miralles and moved back a couple of positions shy of the top 500. Next he reached the semifinals at the 2023 Shenzhen Longhua Open defeating Kazakh Beibit Zhukayev and moved more than 100 positions into the top 400. He also qualified for the next new tournament in China, the 2023 Shenzhen Luohu Challenger and defeated seventh seed Denis Yevseyev.

In May 2024, he reached the final of the 2024 Wuxi Open in China but lost to Bu Yunchaokete. As a result, he moved 45 positions up into the top 275 in the rankings on 20 May 2024. Ranked No. 304 at the 2024 Shanghai Masters, where as a qualifier, he entered the main draw of the tournament for the first time and only the second time in his career at a Masters-level since 2021, he lost to Taro Daniel.

== Singles performance timelines ==
Key
W	F	SF	QF	#R	RR	Q#	P#	DNQ	A	Z#	PO	G	S	B	NMS	NTI	P	NH

(W) winner; (F) finalist; (SF) semifinalist; (QF) quarterfinalist; (#R) rounds 4, 3, 2, 1; (RR) round-robin stage; (Q#) qualification round; (P#) preliminary round; (DNQ) did not qualify; (A) absent; (Z#) Davis/Fed Cup Zonal Group (with number indication) or (PO) play-off; (G) gold, (S) silver or (B) bronze Olympic/Paralympic medal; (NMS) not a Masters tournament; (NTI) not a Tier I tournament; (P) postponed; (NH) not held; (SR) strike rate (events won / competed); (W–L) win–loss record.
To avoid confusion and double counting, these charts are updated at the conclusion of a tournament or when the player's participation has ended.

Current through the 2024 Rolex Shanghai Masters.

Tournament	2013	2014	2015	2016	2017	2018	2019	2020	2021	2022	2023	2024	SR	W–L	Win%
Grand Slam tournaments
Australian Open	A	Q1	A	Q2	A	A	Q1	2R	2R	1R	Q1		0 / 3	2–3	40%
French Open	A	A	A	Q1	A	Q1	Q1	1R	1R	Q2	Q1		0 / 2	0–2	0%
Wimbledon	A	A	A	A	Q1	Q1	Q1	NH	2R	A	Q1		0 / 1	1–1	50%
US Open	A	Q1	A	Q1	Q2	Q2	2R	2R	1R	A	Q1		0 / 3	2–3	40%
Win–loss	0–0	0–0	0–0	0–0	0–0	0–0	1–1	2–3	2–4	0–1			0 / 9	5–9	36%
ATP Masters 1000
Indian Wells Masters	A	A	A	A	A	A	Q2	NH	1R	Q1			0 / 1	0–1	0%
Miami Masters	A	A	A	A	A	A	Q1	NH	A	Q1			0 / 0	0–0	–
Monte Carlo Masters	A	A	A	A	A	A	A	NH	Q1				0 / 0	0–0	–
Madrid Masters	A	A	A	A	A	A	A	NH	Q1				0 / 0	0–0	–
Italian Open	A	A	A	A	A	A	A	Q1	Q1				0 / 0	0–0	–
Canada Masters	A	A	A	A	A	A	A	NH	A				0 / 0	0–0	–
Cincinnati Masters	A	A	A	A	A	A	A	Q1	Q1				0 / 0	0–0	–
Shanghai Masters	A	A	A	A	A	A	A	NH			Q1	1R	0 / 1	0–1	0%
Paris Masters	A	A	A	A	A	A	Q2	A	Q1				0 / 0	0–0	–
Win–loss	0–0	0–0	0–0	0–0	0–0	0–0	0–0	0–0	0–1	0–0	0–0	0–1	0 / 2	0–2	0%
Career statistics
Tournament	2013	2014	2015	2016	2017	2018	2019	2020	2021	2022	2023	2024	SR	W–L	Win%
Tournaments	0	1	0	0	0	2	7	9	24	8	1	1	53		
Titles	0	0	0	0	0	0	0	0	0	0			0		
Finals	0	0	0	0	0	0	0	1	0	0			1		
Overall win–loss	1–1	2–2	5–1	3–0	3–0	5–5	10–7	13–10	16–24	4–8	1–1	0–1	0 / 53	63–60	51%
Win%	50%	50%	83%	100%	100%	50%	59%	57%	40%	25%	50%	0%	51.72%		
Year-end ranking	253	268	188	297	149	157	98	78	113	282	366	334	$2,091,386		

== ATP career finals ==
=== Singles: 1 (1 runner-up) ===
Legend Grand Slam ATP Masters 1000 ATP 500 Series ATP 250 Series (0–1)	Titles by surface Hard (0–1) Clay (0–0) Grass (0–0)	Titles by setting Outdoor (0–1) Indoor (0–0)

Result	W–L	Date	Tournament	Tier	Surface	Opponent	Score
Loss	0–1	Feb 2020	Maharashtra Open, India	250 Series	Hard	(Czech Republic) Jiří Veselý	6–7^{(2–7)}, 7–5, 3–6

== ATP Challenger and ITF Tour finals ==
=== Singles (9–13) ===
Legend (singles) ATP Challenger Tour (6–3) ITF Futures Tour (3–10)	Titles by surface Hard (9–11) Clay (0–2)

Result	W–L	Date	Tournament	Tier	Surface	Opponent	Score
Loss	0-1	Mar 2012	Kazakhstan F1, Almaty	Futures	Hard (i)	(Kazakhstan) Alexey Kedryuk	3–6, 6–1, 0–6
Loss	0-2	Apr 2012	Kazakhstan F2, Nur-Sultan	Futures	Hard (i)	(Russia) Alexey Vatutin	6–7^{(1–7)}, 2–6
Loss	0-3	Jul 2012	Kazakhstan F6, Almaty	Futures	Hard	(Ukraine) Illya Marchenko	4–6, 2–6
Win	1-3	Aug 2013	Belarus F1, Minsk	Futures	Hard	(Russia) Andrey Rublev	7–6^{(7–2)}, 4–6, 6–4
Win	2-3	Aug 2013	Belarus F3, Minsk	Futures	Hard	(Germany) Stefan Seifert	6–3, 6–4
Loss	2-4	Dec 2013	Egypt F34, Sharm el Sheikh	Futures	Clay	(Spain) Marc Giner	Default
Loss	2-5	Jun 2014	Spain F15, Palma del Rio	Futures	Hard	(Colombia) Eduardo Struvay	4–6, 6–7^{(4–7)}
Loss	2-6	Jul 2015	Turkey F27, Istanbul	Futures	Hard	(Georgia (country)) Aleksandre Metreveli	3–6, 3–6
Loss	2-7	Aug 2015	Belarus F1, Minsk	Futures	Hard	(Ukraine) Denys Molchanov	4–6, 5–7
Loss	2-8	Sep 2015	Russia F8, Vsevolozhsk	Futures	Clay	(Russia) Mikhail Elgin	3–6, 3–6
Win	3-8	Nov 2015	Bratislava, Slovakia	Challenger	Hard (i)	(Slovakia) Lukáš Lacko	7–6^{(7–1)}, 7–6^{(7–5)}
Loss	3-9	Feb 2016	Bergamo, Italy	Challenger	Hard (i)	(France) Pierre-Hugues Herbert	3–6, 6–7^{(5–7)}
Win	4-9	Apr 2017	Saint Brieuc, France	Challenger	Hard (i)	(Germany) Tobias Kamke	7–6^{(7–3)}, 7–6^{(7–5)}
Win	5-9	Apr 2017	Uzbekistan F1, Bukhara	Futures	Hard	(Kazakhstan) Dmitry Popko	6–1, 7–5
Loss	5-10	Apr 2017	Uzbekistan F2, Qarshi	Futures	Hard	(Uzbekistan) Sanjar Fayziev	6–7^{(4–7)}, 7–5, 6–7^{(5–7)}
Win	6-10	May 2017	Qarshi, Uzbekistan	Challenger	Hard	(Turkey) Cem İlkel	6–3, 7–6^{(7–4)}
Win	7-10	Jul 2017	Nur-Sultan, Kazakhstan	Challenger	Hard	(Kazakhstan) Mikhail Kukushkin	7–6^{(11–9)}, 4–6, 6–4
Win	8-10	May 2018	Qarshi, Uzbekistan	Challenger	Hard	(Belarus) Sergey Betov	7–6^{(7–3)}, 2–0 Ret.
Win	9-10	Jul 2019	Recanati, Italy	Challenger	Hard	(Italy) Roberto Marcora	6–2, 7–5
Loss	9–11	Sep 2023	M25 Hong Kong, Hong Kong	WTT	Hard	(Hong Kong) Coleman Wong	6–4, 4–3 ret.
Loss	9–12	May 2024	Wuxi, China	Challenger	Hard	(China) Yunchaokete Bu	4–6, 1–6
Loss	9–13	Aug 2025	M15 Astana, Kasachstan	WTT	Hard	Petr Bar Biryukov	4–6, 6–7^{(7–9)}

=== Doubles (7–5) ===
Legend (singles) ATP Challenger Tour ITF Futures Tour	Titles by surface Hard (4–3) Clay (3–2)

Result	W–L	Date	Tournament	Tier	Surface	Partner	Opponent	Score
Loss	01.	August 2011	Lithuania F1 Futures	Futures	Clay (O)	(Belarus) Nikolai Fidirko	(Chile) Hans Podlipnik-Castillo (Belarus) Andrei Vasilevski	2–6, 2–6
Loss	02.	November 2011	Kazakhstan F7 Futures	Futures	Hard (I)	(Belarus) Yaraslav Shyla	(Russia) Vitaliy Kachanovskiy (Russia) Sergei Krotiouk	6–7^{(1–7)}, 1–6
Win	03.	March 2012	Kazakhstan F1 Futures	Futures	Hard (I)	(Russia) Andrei Levine	(Russia) Vitaliy Kachanovskiy (Russia) Alexander Pavlioutchenkov	6–1, 6–2
Loss	04.	June 2012	Poland F2 Futures	Futures	Clay	(Belarus) Dzmitry Zhyrmont	(Chile) Guillermo Hormazábal (Poland) Grzegorz Panfil	2–6, 7–6^{(7–4)}, [5–10]
Win	05.	June 2012	Russia F9 Futures	Futures	Clay	(Belarus) Andrei Vasilevski	(Russia) Ivan Nedelko (Russia) Anton Zaitcev	6–4, 6–4
Loss	06.	March 2013	Russia F2 Futures	Futures	Hard (i)	(Belarus) Andrei Vasilevski	(Netherlands) Antal Van der Duim (Netherlands) Boy Westerhof	6–7^{(8–10)}, 3–6
Loss	07.	October 2013	Kazan Kremlin Cup, Russia	Challenger	Hard (i)	(Belarus) Dzmitry Zhyrmont	(Moldova) Radu Albot (Uzbekistan) Farrukh Dustov	2–6, 7–6^{(7–3)}, [7–10]
Win	08.	March 2014	Croatia F5 Futures	Futures	Clay	(Belarus) Dzmitry Zhyrmont	(Croatia) Dino Marcan (Croatia) Antonio Šančić	6–4, 4–6, [10–6]
Win	09.	May 2014	Russia F3 Futures	Futures	Clay	(Russia) Stanislav Vovk	(Russia) Denis Matsukevich (Russia) Andrey Rublev	2–6, 6–4, [10–8]
Win	10.	February 2015	Delhi Open, India	Challenger	Hard	(Russia) Alexander Kudryavtsev	(Italy) Riccardo Ghedin (Japan) Toshihide Matsui	6–7^{(5–7)}, 6–4, [10–6]
Win	11.	August 2015	Belarus F1 Futures	Futures	Hard	(Belarus) Ilya Ivashka	(Belarus) Artur Dubinski (Ukraine) Volodymyr Uzhylovskyi	6–3, 6–4
Win	12.	August 2015	Belarus F2 Futures	Futures	Hard	(Belarus) Ilya Ivashka	(Russia) Daniil Medvedev (China) Zhang Zhizhen	6–1, 6–3

== Record against other players ==
=== Wins over top 10 players ===
Gerasimov has a 1–5 record against players who were, at the time the match was played, ranked in the top 10.

Season	2020	Total
Wins	1	1

#	Player	Rank	Event	Surface	Rd	Score	EGR
2020
1.	(Belgium) David Goffin	10	Marseille, France	Hard	2R	6–4, 7–6^{(7–5)}	72

* As of 7 March 2021
