= Marko Tepavac =

Serbian tennis player

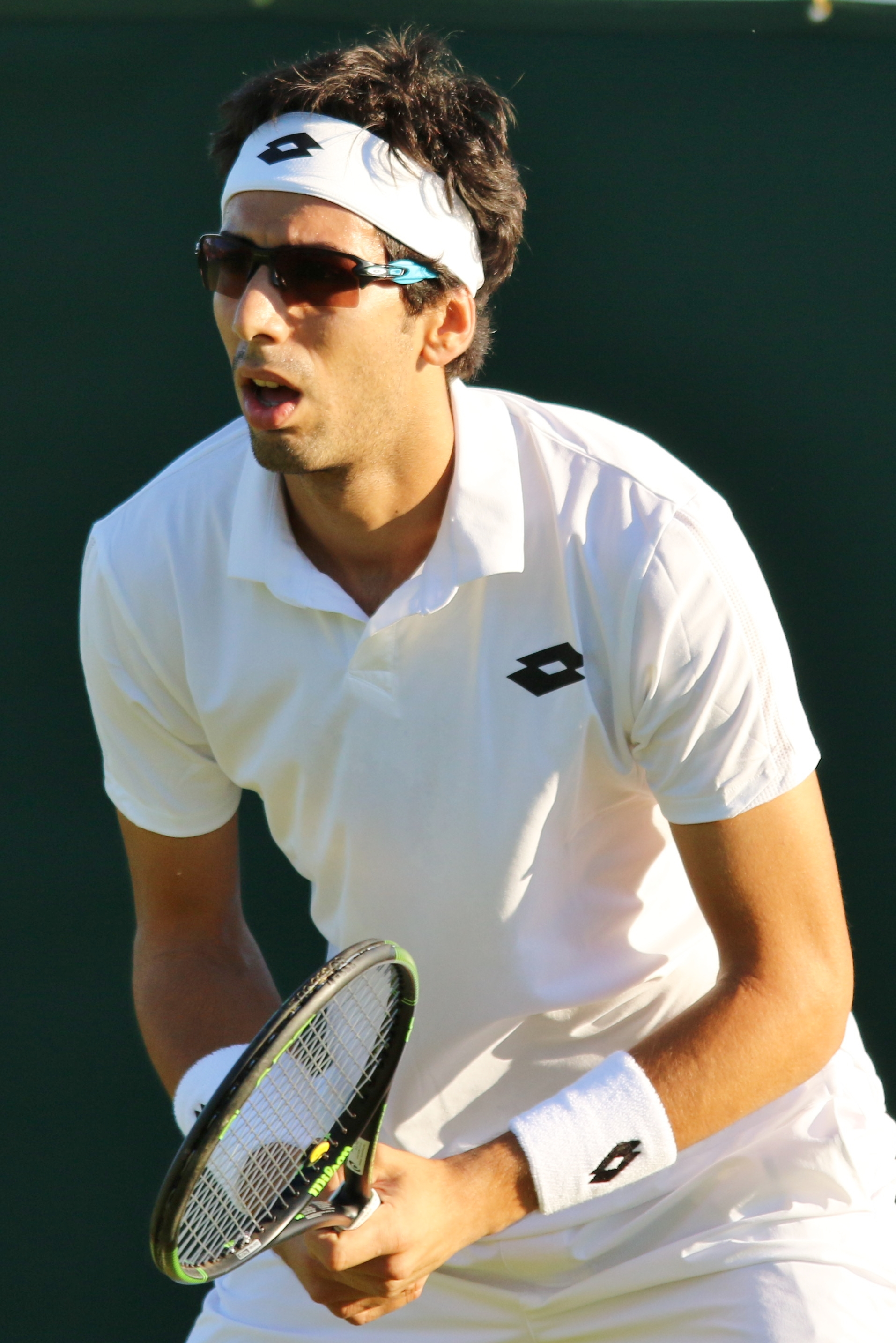
- Country (sports): Serbia
- Residence: Belgrade, Serbia
- Born: 5 April 1994 (age 31) Belgrade, Serbia, FR Yugoslavia
- Height: 1.93 m (6 ft 4 in)
- Turned pro: 2011
- Retired: 2022
- Plays: Right-handed (two-handed backhand)
- Coach: Nikola Ćirić
- Prize money: US $155,408

Singles
- Career record: 0–1
- Career titles: 0
- Highest ranking: No. 174 (24 October 2016)

Grand Slam singles results
- Australian Open: Q1 (2017)
- Wimbledon: Q1 (2016)
- US Open: Q2 (2016)

Doubles
- Career record: 0–1
- Career titles: 0
- Highest ranking: No. 584 (19 June 2017)
- Last updated on: 22 February 2025.

Marko Tepavac (Serbian Cyrillic: Марко Тепавац; born 5 April 1994) is a former Serbian professional tennis player, mainly competing on the ATP Challenger Tour. On 24 October 2016, he reached his best singles ranking of world No. 174, while on 19 June 2017, he peaked at world No. 584 in the doubles rankings.

== Professional career ==
=== 2016 ===
In May 2016, he won his first trophy on the ATP Challenger Tour, winning Karshi Challenger in Uzbekistan.

=== 2017 ===
Tepavac made his ATP main draw debut as a lucky loser at 2017 Garanti Koza Sofia Open, losing in the first round to Mikhail Youzhny.

== ATP Challenger Tour and ITF Futures finals ==
=== Singles: 24 (17–7) ===
Legend
ATP Challenger Tour (1–0)
ITF Futures (16–7)

Result	Date	Category	Tournament	Surface	Opponent	Score
Winner	7 May 2016	Challenger	Karshi, Uzbekistan	Hard	(Israel) Dudi Sela	2–6, 6–3, 7–6^{(7–4)}

=== Doubles: 7 (4–3) ===
Legend
ATP Challenger Tour (0–1)
ITF Futures (4–2)

Result	Date	Category	Tournament	Surface	Partner	Opponents	Score
Runner–up	13 November 2016	Challenger	Ortisei, Italy	Hard (i)	(Canada) Frank Dancevic	(Germany) Kevin Krawietz (France) Albano Olivetti	4–6, 4–6
