= Rainer Eitzinger =

Austrian tennis player

- Country (sports): Austria
- Born: 26 June 1983 (age 42) Schwaz, Austria
- Height: 5 ft 10 in (178 cm)
- Plays: Right-handed
- Prize money: $192,197

Singles
- Career record: 4–6
- Highest ranking: No. 166 (31 July 2006)

Doubles
- Career record: 0–3
- Highest ranking: No. 275 (9 August 2010)

Rainer Eitzinger (born 26 June 1983) is an Austrian former professional tennis player. He turned professional in 2003, and he achieved his career-high singles ATP ranking of 166 in July 2006. He retired in 2011. He played mostly in the ATP challenger and the ITF Futures circuits. He also represented Austria in a Davis Cup match in 2006 vs. Mexico, where he defeated Daniel Garza.
