= Anton Zaitcev =

Russian tennis player

Anton Zaitcev Антон Зайцев
- Country (sports): Russia
- Born: 22 July 1987 (age 38) Izmail, Ukrainian SSR
- Height: 1.80 m (5 ft 11 in)
- Plays: Right-handed (two-handed backhand)
- Prize money: $72,914

Singles
- Career record: 0–0 (at ATP Tour level, Grand Slam level, and in Davis Cup)
- Career titles: 6 ITF
- Highest ranking: No. 296 (24 November 2014)

Doubles
- Career record: 0–1 (at ATP Tour level, Grand Slam level, and in Davis Cup)
- Career titles: 8 ITF
- Highest ranking: No. 232 (20 July 2015)

Anton Anatolyevich Zaitcev (Russian: Антон Анатольевич Зайцев, romanized: Zaytsev; born 22 July 1987) is a Russian tennis player.

== Tennis career ==
Zaitcev has a career high ATP singles ranking of No. 296 achieved on 24 November 2014. This ranking came shortly after his sole appearance at an ATP Challenger Tour Quarter-Final in Tashkent, Uzbekistan, where he was narrowly defeated by then world number 72 Sergiy Stakhovsky 6-4 5-7 4-6. He also has a career high ATP doubles ranking of No. 232 achieved on 20 July 2015. He has won five ITF singles titles and seven ITF doubles titles.

Zaitcev made his ATP main draw debut at the 2015 Kremlin Cup where he received entry to the doubles main draw as a wildcard entrant, partnering Richard Muzaev.
