= Carles Poch Gradin =

Spanish tennis player (born 1982)

- Country (sports): Spain
- Residence: Barcelona, Catalonia, Spain
- Born: 9 November 1982 (age 42); Barcelona, Spain
- Height: 1.85 m (6 ft 1 in)
- Turned pro: 1999
- Plays: Left-handed
- Prize money: $144,873

Singles
- Career record: 0–0
- Career titles: 0
- Highest ranking: No. 215 (28 August 2009)
- Current ranking: No. 325 (19 July 2010)

Doubles
- Career titles: 0
- Highest ranking: No. 145 (8 June 2009)
- Last updated on: July 27, 2009.

Carles Poch Gradin (born 9 November 1982) is a Spanish professional tennis player. He has won two ATP Challenger events, both in doubles.

Poch Gradin has reached the finals of ten Futures tournaments; five of these he won—in Romania, Latvia, Poland, and Spain.
