= Karshi Challenger =

- 2018 Karshi Challenger

Defunct tennis tournament
- Location: Qarshi, Uzbekistan
- Category: ATP Challenger Tour
- Surface: Hard
- Draw: 32S/32Q/16D
- Prize money: $50,000+H
- Website: Website

The Karshi Challenger was a tennis tournament held in Qarshi, Uzbekistan from 2007 until 2018. The event was part of the ATP Challenger Tour and was played on outdoor hardcourts.

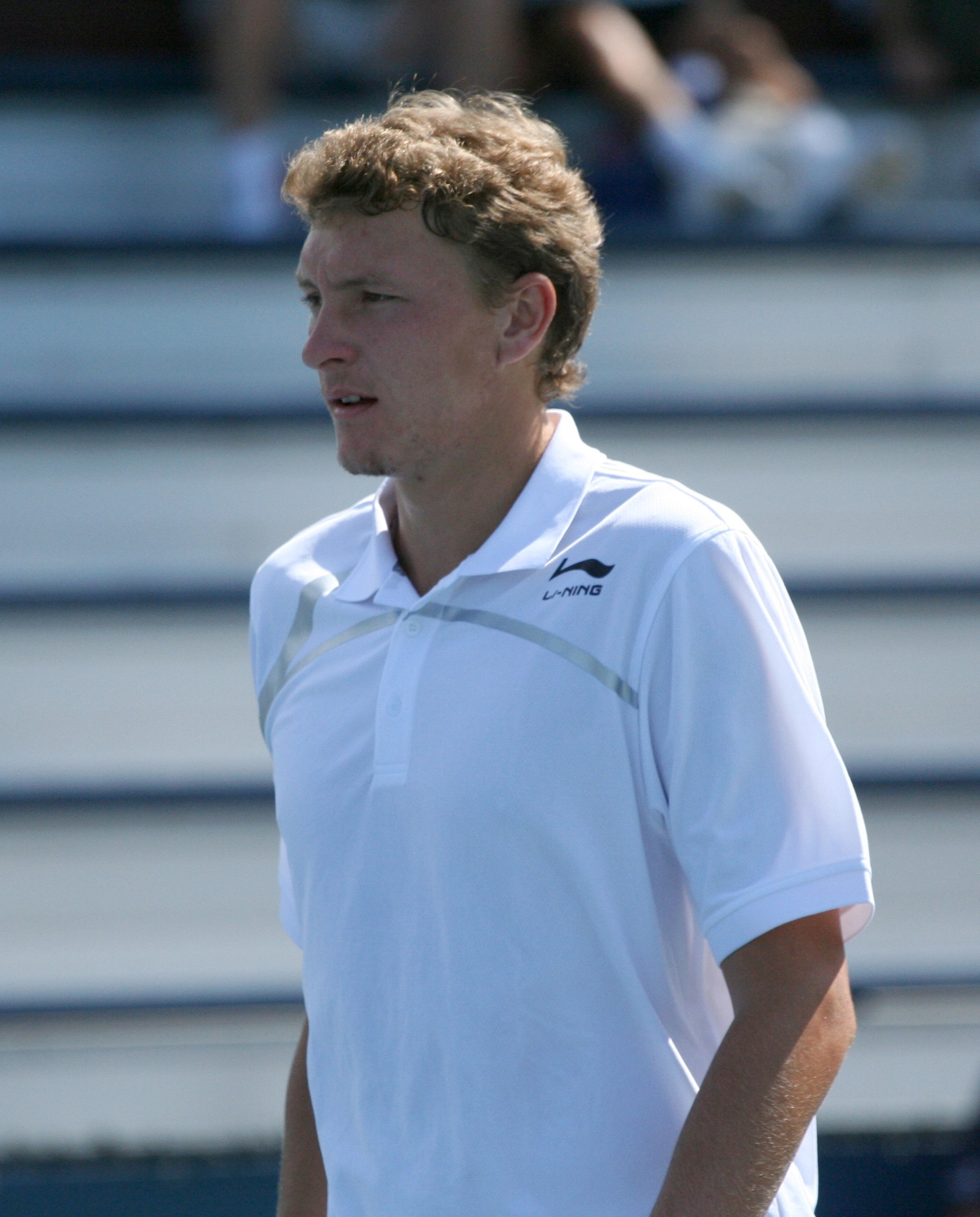
Uzbekistani Denis Istomin won the Qarshi Challenger singles in 2007, 2008 and 2011.

== Past finals ==
=== Singles ===
Year	Champion	Runner-up	Score
2018	(Belarus) Egor Gerasimov	(Belarus) Sergey Betov	7–6^{(7–3)}, 2–0 ret.
2017	(Belarus) Egor Gerasimov	(Turkey) Cem İlkel	6–3, 7–6^{(7–4)}
2016	(Serbia) Marko Tepavac	(Israel) Dudi Sela	2–6, 6–3, 7–6^{(7–4)}
2015	(Russia) Teymuraz Gabashvili	(Russia) Evgeny Donskoy	5–2 ret.
2014	(Georgia (country)) Nikoloz Basilashvili	(United States) Chase Buchanan	7–6^{(7–2)}, 6–2
2013	(Russia) Teymuraz Gabashvili	(Moldova) Radu Albot	6–4, 6–4
2012	(Russia) Igor Kunitsyn	(Belarus) Dzmitry Zhyrmont	7–6^{(12–10)}, 6–2
2011	(Uzbekistan) Denis Istomin	(Slovenia) Blaž Kavčič	6–3, 1–6, 6–1
2010	(Slovenia) Blaž Kavčič	(New Zealand) Michael Venus	7–6^{(8–6)}, 7–6^{(7–5)}
2009	(Austria) Rainer Eitzinger	(Ukraine) Ivan Sergeyev	6–3, 1–6, 7–6^{(7–3)}
2008	(Uzbekistan) Denis Istomin	(Russia) Mikhail Elgin	6–3, 7–6^{(7–4)}
2007	(Uzbekistan) Denis Istomin	(Turkey) Marsel İlhan	6–1, 6–4

=== Doubles ===
Year	Champion	Runner-up	Score
2018	(Kazakhstan) Timur Khabibulin (Ukraine) Vladyslav Manafov	(Uzbekistan) Sanjar Fayziev (Uzbekistan) Jurabek Karimov	6–2, 6–1
2017	(Ukraine) Denys Molchanov (Ukraine) Sergiy Stakhovsky	(Germany) Kevin Krawietz (Spain) Adrián Menéndez Maceiras	6–4, 7–6^{(9–7)}
2016	(Spain) Enrique López Pérez (India) Jeevan Nedunchezhiyan	(Georgia (country)) Aleksandre Metreveli (Kazakhstan) Dmitry Popko	6–1, 6–4
2015	(India) Yuki Bhambri (Spain) Adrián Menéndez Maceiras	(Belarus) Sergey Betov (Russia) Mikhail Elgin	5–7, 6–3, [10–8]
2014	(Belarus) Sergey Betov (Belarus) Aliaksandr Bury	(China) Gong Maoxin (Chinese Taipei) Peng Hsien-yin	7–5, 1–6, [10–6]
2013	(Chinese Taipei) Chen Ti (Spain) Guillermo Olaso	(Australia) Jordan Kerr (Russia) Konstantin Kravchuk	7–6^{(7–5)}, 7–5
2012	(Chinese Taipei) Hsin-han Lee (Chinese Taipei) Peng Hsien-yin	(Australia) Brydan Klein (Japan) Yasutaka Uchiyama	6–7^{(5–7)}, 6–4, [10–4]
2011	(Russia) Mikhail Elgin (Russia) Alexander Kudryavtsev	(Russia) Konstantin Kravchuk (Ukraine) Denys Molchanov	3–6, 6–3, [11–9]
2010	(China) Gong Maoxin (China) Li Zhe	(India) Divij Sharan (India) Vishnu Vardhan	6–3, 6–1
2009	(Australia) Sadik Kadir (India) Purav Raja	(Latvia) Andis Juška (Latvia) Deniss Pavlovs	6–3, 7–6^{(7–4)}
2008	(Poland) Łukasz Kubot (Austria) Oliver Marach	(Austria) Andreas Haider-Maurer (Austria) Philipp Oswald	6–4, 6–4
2007	(Australia) Andrew Coelho (Australia) Adam Feeney	(Croatia) Ivan Dodig (Romania) Horia Tecău	6–2, 3–6, [10–7]
