= Temur Ismailov =

Uzbekistani tennis player (born 1995)

Temur Ismailov Темур Исмаилов
- Country (sports): Uzbekistan
- Residence: Tashkent, Uzbekistan
- Born: 14 January 1995 (age 30) Tashkent, Uzbekistan
- Plays: Right-handed (two handed-backhand)
- Prize money: $73,591

Singles
- Career record: 0–3 (at ATP Tour level, Grand Slam level, and in Davis Cup)
- Career titles: 0
- Highest ranking: No. 397 (13 June 2016)

Grand Slam singles results
- Australian Open Junior: 1R (2012)
- French Open Junior: Q1 (2012)
- Wimbledon Junior: Q2 (2012)
- US Open Junior: 1R (2012)

Doubles
- Career record: 0–0 (at ATP Tour level, Grand Slam level, and in Davis Cup)
- Career titles: 0
- Highest ranking: No. 756 (23 May 2016)

Grand Slam doubles results
- Australian Open Junior: 2R (2012)
- French Open Junior: 1R (2012)
- Wimbledon Junior: 2R (2012)
- US Open Junior: 1R (2012)

Team competitions
- Davis Cup: 0–3

Temur Ismailov (Uzbek: Темур Исмаилов; born 14 January 1995) is a currently banned Uzbekistani tennis player.

Ismailov has a career high ATP singles ranking of No. 397 achieved on 13 June 2016 and a career high ATP doubles ranking of No. 756 achieved on 23 May 2016.

Ismailov has represented Uzbekistan at the Davis Cup where he has a W/L record of 0–3.
