= 2017 Chengdu Open – Doubles =

Doubles
- 2017 Chengdu Open

Final
- Champions: (Israel) Jonathan Erlich (Pakistan) Aisam-ul-Haq Qureshi
- Runners-up: (New Zealand) Marcus Daniell (Brazil) Marcelo Demoliner
- Score: 6–3, 7–6^{(7–3)}

Events
Singles	Doubles
← 2016 ·	Chengdu Open	· 2018 →

Raven Klaasen and Rajeev Ram were the defending champions, but Klaasen chose not to participate this year and Ram chose to compete in Shenzhen instead.

Jonathan Erlich and Aisam-ul-Haq Qureshi won the title, defeating Marcus Daniell and Marcelo Demoliner in the final, 6–3, 7–6^{(7–3)}.

== Seeds ==
1. (Austria) Oliver Marach / (Croatia) Mate Pavić (first round)
2. (Chile) Julio Peralta / (New Zealand) Michael Venus (quarterfinals)
3. (Mexico) Santiago González / (Serbia) Nenad Zimonjić (semifinals)
4. (United Kingdom) Dominic Inglot / (Canada) Daniel Nestor (quarterfinals)

== Draw ==
=== Key ===
- Q = Qualifier
- WC = Wild card
- LL = Lucky loser
- Alt = Alternate
- SE = Special exempt
- PR = Protected ranking
- ITF = ITF entry
- JE = Junior exempt
- w/o = Walkover
- r = Retired
- d = Defaulted
- SR = Special ranking

=== Draw ===
First round
1	(Austria) O Marach (Croatia) M Pavić	4	6^{8}
(Israel) J Erlich (Pakistan) A-u-H Qureshi	6	7^{10}
(Argentina) L Mayer (Spain) A Ramos Viñolas	6	6
(Germany) J-L Struff (Austria) D Thiem	4	2
3	(Mexico) S González (Serbia) N Zimonjić	6	6
WC	(China) F Sun (China) R Te	4	4
(Russia) K Khachanov (Russia) A Rublev	1	6^{4}
(Philippines) T Huey (France) F Martin	6	7^{7}
(Thailand) So Ratiwatana (Japan) Y Sugita	6	5	[6]
(Chinese Taipei) Y-h Lu (India) D Sharan	4	7	[10]
WC	(China) D Wu (China) Y Wu	6^{6}	3
4	(United Kingdom) D Inglot (Canada) D Nestor	7^{8}	6
(Georgia (country)) N Basilashvili (Uzbekistan) D Istomin	6	4	[6]
(New Zealand) M Daniell (Brazil) M Demoliner	4	6	[10]
(Croatia) B Ćorić (Argentina) G Pella	1	3
2	(Chile) J Peralta (New Zealand) M Venus	6	6

Quarterfinals
(Israel) J Erlich (Pakistan) A-u-H Qureshi	6	2	[10]
(Argentina) L Mayer (Spain) A Ramos Viñolas	3	6	[4]
3	(Mexico) S González (Serbia) N Zimonjić	7	5	[10]
(Philippines) T Huey (France) F Martin	5	7	[3]
(Chinese Taipei) Y-h Lu (India) D Sharan	6	6
4	(United Kingdom) D Inglot (Canada) D Nestor	3	3
(New Zealand) M Daniell (Brazil) M Demoliner	7^{7}	6^{3}	[10]
2	(Chile) J Peralta (New Zealand) M Venus	6^{5}	7^{7}	[7]

Semifinals
(Israel) J Erlich (Pakistan) A-u-H Qureshi	6	6
3	(Mexico) S González (Serbia) N Zimonjić	3	4
(Chinese Taipei) Y-h Lu (India) D Sharan	3	3
(New Zealand) M Daniell (Brazil) M Demoliner	6	6

Final
(Israel) J Erlich (Pakistan) A-u-H Qureshi	6	7^{7}
(New Zealand) M Daniell (Brazil) M Demoliner	3	6^{3}
