= 2025 Chengdu Open – Singles =

Singles
- 2025 Chengdu Open

Final
- Champion: (Chile) Alejandro Tabilo
- Runner-up: (Italy) Lorenzo Musetti
- Score: 6–3, 2–6, 7–6^{(7–5)}

Details
- Draw: 28 (4 Q / 3 WC )
- Seeds: 8

Events
Singles	Doubles
← 2024 ·	Chengdu Open	· 2026 →

Alejandro Tabilo defeated Lorenzo Musetti in the final, 6–3, 2–6, 7–6^{(7–5)} to win the singles tennis title at the 2025 Chengdu Open. It was his third ATP Tour title, and he saved two championship points en route. Tabilo was the second qualifier in the 2025 season to win an ATP Tour title, after Jenson Brooksby at the U.S. Men's Clay Court Championships.

Shang Juncheng was the defending champion, but lost in the second round to Brandon Nakashima.

== Seeds ==
The top four seeds received a bye into the second round.

1. (Italy) Lorenzo Musetti (final)
2. (Italy) Luciano Darderi (second round)
3. (Netherlands) Tallon Griekspoor (second round)
4. (United States) Brandon Nakashima (semifinals)
5. (United Kingdom) Cameron Norrie (first round)
6. (France) Giovanni Mpetshi Perricard (second round)
7. (Argentina) Sebastián Báez (withdrew)
8. (Italy) Lorenzo Sonego (second round)

== Draw ==
=== Key ===
- Q = Qualifier
- WC = Wild card
- LL = Lucky loser
- Alt = Alternate
- ITF = ITF entry
- PR = Protected ranking
- SR = Special ranking
- SE = Special exempt
- JE = Junior exempt
- JR = Junior Accelerator Programme entrant
- CO = College Accelerator Programme entrant
- NG = Next Gen Accelerator Program entrant
- w/o = Walkover
- r = Retired
- d = Defaulted

=== Finals ===
Semifinals
1	(Italy) Lorenzo Musetti	6	6
(Kazakhstan) Alexander Shevchenko	3	1
4	(United States) Brandon Nakashima	4	6^{0}
Q	(Chile) Alejandro Tabilo	6	7^{7}

Final
1	(Italy) Lorenzo Musetti	3	6	6^{5}
Q	(Chile) Alejandro Tabilo	6	2	7^{7}

=== Top half ===
First round
(France) T Atmane	4	3
NG	(Croatia) D Prižmić	6	6
Q	(United States) M McDonald	6	3	6
(Netherlands) B van de Zandschulp	4	6	3
Q	(Georgia (country)) N Basilashvili	7^{7}	6
LL	(United Kingdom) B Harris	6^{5}	3
Q	(Japan) T Daniel	6	6
WC	(Hong Kong) C Wong	3	2
(Kazakhstan) A Shevchenko	6^{3}	6	1
(France) G Monfils	7^{7}	3	0^{r}
(Austria) F Misolic	6	1	4
6	(France) G Mpetshi Perricard	3	6	6

Second round
1	(Italy) L Musetti	7	3	6
NG	(Croatia) D Prižmić	5	6	2
Q	(United States) M McDonald	2	6^{4}
Q	(Georgia (country)) N Basilashvili	6	7^{7}
3	(Netherlands) T Griekspoor	6	4	3
Q	(Japan) T Daniel	3	6	6
(Kazakhstan) A Shevchenko	6^{2}	7^{7}	6
6	(France) G Mpetshi Perricard	7^{7}	6^{5}	4

Quarterfinals
1	(Italy) L Musetti	6	6
Q	(Georgia (country)) N Basilashvili	3	3
Q	(Japan) T Daniel	6^{2}	6	2
(Kazakhstan) A Shevchenko	7^{7}	3	6

Semifinals
1	(Italy) L Musetti	6	6
(Kazakhstan) A Shevchenko	3	1

=== Bottom half ===
First round
8	(Italy) L Sonego	4	6	6
(Argentina) JM Cerúndolo	6	3	1
(United States) M Giron	7	6
(United States) E Quinn	5	4
(Belgium) Z Bergs	1	7	4
WC	(China) J Shang	6	5	6
5	(United Kingdom) C Norrie	7^{7}	4	6^{2}
WC	(China) Y Zhou	6^{3}	6	7^{7}
(France) Q Halys	7^{7}	3	4
(Australia) C O'Connell	6^{3}	6	6
(Australia) J Thompson	4	3
Q	(Chile) A Tabilo	6	6

Second round
8	(Italy) L Sonego	4	4
(United States) M Giron	6	6
WC	(China) J Shang	5	3
4	(United States) B Nakashima	7	6
WC	(China) Y Zhou	2	4
(Australia) C O'Connell	6	6
Q	(Chile) A Tabilo	6	6
2	(Italy) L Darderi	4	3

Quarterfinals
(United States) M Giron	3	6	6^{3}
4	(United States) B Nakashima	6	2	7^{7}
(Australia) C O'Connell	6	5	2
Q	(Chile) A Tabilo	4	7	6

Semifinals
4	(United States) B Nakashima	4	6^{0}
Q	(Chile) A Tabilo	6	7^{7}

== Qualifying ==
=== Seeds ===
1. (Australia) Tristan Schoolkate (first round)
2. (United States) Mackenzie McDonald (qualified)
3. (Australia) James Duckworth (first round)
4. (Chile) Alejandro Tabilo (qualified)
5. (Georgia (country)) Nikoloz Basilashvili (qualified)
6. (United States) Zachary Svajda (first round)
7. (United Kingdom) Billy Harris (qualifying competition, lucky loser)
8. (Germany) Yannick Hanfmann (first round)

=== Qualifiers ===
1. (Georgia (country)) Nikoloz Basilashvili
2. (United States) Mackenzie McDonald
3. (Japan) Taro Daniel
4. (Chile) Alejandro Tabilo

=== Lucky loser ===
1. (United Kingdom) Billy Harris

=== Qualifying draw ===
==== First qualifier ====
First round
1	(Australia) Tristan Schoolkate	4	4
(Australia) Bernard Tomic	6	6
Alt	(Japan) Rei Sakamoto	2	6	1
5	(Georgia (country)) Nikoloz Basilashvili	6	3	6

Qualifying competition
(Australia) Bernard Tomic	6	5	5
5	(Georgia (country)) Nikoloz Basilashvili	2	7	7

==== Second qualifier ====
First round
2	(United States) Mackenzie McDonald	6	3
(Australia) James McCabe	3	0^{r}
(Norway) Nicolai Budkov Kjær	6	6
8	(Germany) Yannick Hanfmann	3	4

Qualifying competition
2	(United States) Mackenzie McDonald	4	7	6
(Norway) Nicolai Budkov Kjær	6	5	0

==== Third qualifier ====
First round
3	(Australia) James Duckworth	6^{4}	6^{0}
(Japan) Taro Daniel	7^{7}	7^{7}
WC	(China) Jiang Fumin	3	2
7	(United Kingdom) Billy Harris	6	6

Qualifying competition
(Japan) Taro Daniel	7	6
7	(United Kingdom) Billy Harris	5	4

==== Fourth qualifier ====
First round
4	(Chile) Alejandro Tabilo	6	6
WC	(China) Te Rigele	4	4
PR	(South Africa) Lloyd Harris	6	6^{5}	6
6	(United States) Zachary Svajda	4	7^{7}	2

Qualifying competition
4	(Chile) Alejandro Tabilo	7^{7}	6^{2}	7^{7}
PR	(South Africa) Lloyd Harris	6^{4}	7^{7}	6^{2}
