= 2019 Chengdu Open – Singles =

Singles
- 2019 Chengdu Open

Final
- Champion: (Spain) Pablo Carreño Busta
- Runner-up: (Kazakhstan) Alexander Bublik
- Score: 6–7^{(5–7)}, 6–4, 7–6^{(7–3)}

Details
- Draw: 28 (4 Q / 3 WC )

Events
Singles	Doubles
← 2018 ·	Chengdu Open	· 2023 →

Bernard Tomic was the defending champion, but retired in the first round of the qualifying tournament against Denis Istomin.

Pablo Carreño Busta won the title, defeating Alexander Bublik in the final, 6–7^{(5–7)}, 6–4, 7–6^{(7–3)}.

== Seeds ==
The top four seeds received a bye into the second round.

1. (United States) John Isner (second round)
2. (Canada) Félix Auger-Aliassime (second round)
3. (France) Benoît Paire (second round)
4. (Bulgaria) Grigor Dimitrov (quarterfinals)
5. (Serbia) Dušan Lajović (second round)
6. (United States) Taylor Fritz (first round)
7. (United Kingdom) Kyle Edmund (first round)
8. (Canada) Denis Shapovalov (semifinals)

== Draw ==
=== Key ===
- Q = Qualifier
- WC = Wild card
- LL = Lucky loser
- Alt = Alternate
- SE = Special exempt
- PR = Protected ranking
- ITF = ITF entry
- JE = Junior exempt
- w/o = Walkover
- r = Retired
- d = Defaulted
- SR = Special ranking

=== Finals ===
Semifinals
8	(Canada) Denis Shapovalov	3	4
(Spain) Pablo Carreño Busta	6	6
(Kazakhstan) Alexander Bublik	7^{8}	6
LL	(South Africa) Lloyd Harris	6^{6}	4

Final
(Spain) Pablo Carreño Busta	6^{5}	6	7^{7}
(Kazakhstan) Alexander Bublik	7^{7}	4	6^{3}

=== Top half ===
First round
WC	(China) Z Li	6	2	3
SE	(Belarus) E Gerasimov	4	6	6
Q	(United States) B Klahn	4	6	7^{7}
Q	(Chinese Taipei) J Jung	6	3	6^{2}
(Lithuania) R Berankis	4	3
8	(Canada) D Shapovalov	6	6
(Spain) P Carreño Busta	6	6
(Moldova) R Albot	3	4
Q	(Australia) A Popyrin	2	5
(Spain) F Verdasco	6	7
(Chile) C Garín	6	6
7	(United Kingdom) K Edmund	3	2

Second round
1	(United States) J Isner	7^{13}	6^{5}	6^{4}
SE	(Belarus) E Gerasimov	6^{11}	7^{7}	7^{7}
Q	(United States) B Klahn	6	3	6^{3}
8	(Canada) D Shapovalov	3	6	7^{7}
3	(France) B Paire	3	6	3
(Spain) P Carreño Busta	6	3	6
(Spain) F Verdasco	3	6	3
(Chile) C Garín	6	3	6

Quarterfinals
SE	(Belarus) E Gerasimov	4	6	3
8	(Canada) D Shapovalov	6	3	6
(Spain) P Carreño Busta	7	6
(Chile) C Garín	5	2

Semifinals
8	(Canada) D Shapovalov	3	4
(Spain) P Carreño Busta	6	6

=== Bottom half ===
First round
6	(United States) T Fritz	6	5	5
(Kazakhstan) A Bublik	4	7	7
PR	(Canada) V Pospisil	3	6	5
(Australia) J Thompson	6	3	7
(United Kingdom) D Evans	6	4	7^{7}
WC	(China) Y Bai	3	6	6^{4}
5	(Serbia) D Lajović	6	4	6
(Argentina) JI Londero	2	6	4
(Hungary) M Fucsovics	6	4	2
LL	(South Africa) L Harris	4	6	6
WC	(South Korea) H Chung	6	3	4
(Portugal) J Sousa	1	6	6

Second round
(Kazakhstan) A Bublik	6	7
(Australia) J Thompson	4	5
(United Kingdom) D Evans	5	5
4	(Bulgaria) G Dimitrov	7	7
5	(Serbia) D Lajović	3	3
LL	(South Africa) L Harris	6	6
(Portugal) J Sousa	6	6^{5}	6
2	(Canada) F Auger-Aliassime	4	7^{7}	4

Quarterfinals
(Kazakhstan) A Bublik	5	7^{11}	7^{7}
4	(Bulgaria) G Dimitrov	7	6^{9}	6^{3}
LL	(South Africa) L Harris	6^{5}	6	6
(Portugal) J Sousa	7^{7}	3	4

Semifinals
(Kazakhstan) A Bublik	7^{8}	6
LL	(South Africa) L Harris	6^{6}	4

== Qualifying ==
=== Seeds ===
1. (Poland) Kamil Majchrzak (qualified)
2. (Germany) Peter Gojowczyk (withdrew, accepted into Zhuhai main draw)
3. (Australia) Alexei Popyrin (qualified)
4. (United States) Bradley Klahn (qualified)
5. (Australia) Bernard Tomic (first round, retired)
6. (South Africa) Lloyd Harris (qualifying competition, lucky loser)
7. (Chinese Taipei) Jason Jung (qualified)
8. (Australia) James Duckworth (qualifying competition)

=== Qualifiers ===
1. (Poland) Kamil Majchrzak (withdrew)
2. (Chinese Taipei) Jason Jung
3. (Australia) Alexei Popyrin
4. (United States) Bradley Klahn

=== Lucky loser ===
1. (South Africa) Lloyd Harris

=== Qualifying draw ===
==== First qualifier ====
First round
1	(Poland) Kamil Majchrzak	6	7
(Australia) Max Purcell	3	5
(Australia) Harry Bourchier	3	4
8	(Australia) James Duckworth	6	6

Qualifying competition
1	(Poland) Kamil Majchrzak	4	7^{7}	6
8	(Australia) James Duckworth	6	6^{5}	4

==== Second qualifier ====
First round
Alt	(Australia) Luke Saville	6	7
(Australia) Andrew Harris	4	5
(Australia) Akira Santillan	5	6	6^{2}
7	(Chinese Taipei) Jason Jung	7	3	7^{7}

Qualifying competition
Alt	(Australia) Luke Saville	4	2
7	(Chinese Taipei) Jason Jung	6	6

==== Third qualifier ====
First round
3	(Australia) Alexei Popyrin	7^{7}	6
WC	(China) Gao Xin	6^{2}	2
(Uzbekistan) Denis Istomin	6	3
5	(Australia) Bernard Tomic	1	1^{r}

Qualifying competition
3	(Australia) Alexei Popyrin	6	3	7
(Uzbekistan) Denis Istomin	3	6	5

==== Fourth qualifier ====
First round
4	(United States) Bradley Klahn	4	6	6
(Japan) Hiroki Moriya	6	3	4
WC	(China) Cui Jie	7^{7}	3	0
6	(South Africa) Lloyd Harris	6^{4}	6	6

Qualifying competition
4	(United States) Bradley Klahn	6	7^{7}
6	(South Africa) Lloyd Harris	3	6^{0}
