= 2016 Astana Challenger Capital Cup – Doubles =

Doubles
- 2016 Astana Challenger Capital Cup

Final
- Champions: (Kazakhstan) Timur Khabibulin (Kazakhstan) Aleksandr Nedovyesov
- Runners-up: (Russia) Mikhail Elgin (Uzbekistan) Denis Istomin
- Score: 7–6^{(9–7)}, 6–2

Events
Singles	Doubles
Astana Challenger Capital Cup

This was the first edition of the tournament.

Timur Khabibulin and Aleksandr Nedovyesov won the title after defeating Mikhail Elgin and Denis Istomin 7–6^{(9–7)}, 6–2 in the final.

== Seeds ==
1. (Russia) Mikhail Elgin / (Uzbekistan) Denis Istomin (final)
2. (Belarus) Yaraslav Shyla / (Belarus) Andrei Vasilevski (semifinals)
3. (Belarus) Sergey Betov / (Russia) Alexander Kudryavtsev (first round)
4. (Russia) Denis Matsukevich / (Ukraine) Denys Molchanov (quarterfinals)

== Draw ==
=== Key ===
- Q = Qualifier
- WC = Wild card
- LL = Lucky loser
- Alt = Alternate
- ITF = ITF entry
- PR = Protected ranking
- SR = Special ranking
- SE = Special exempt
- JE = Junior exempt
- JR = Junior Accelerator Programme entrant
- CO = College Accelerator Programme entrant
- NG = Next Gen Accelerator Program entrant
- w/o = Walkover
- r = Retired
- d = Defaulted

First round
1	(Russia) M Elgin (Uzbekistan) D Istomin	6	7^{7}
WC	(Kazakhstan) A Kedryuk (Kazakhstan) D Yevseyev	0	6^{3}
(South Korea) Y-s Chung (India) S Mukund	1	5
(Japan) Yuya Kibi (South Korea) S-w Kwon	6	7
3	(Belarus) S Betov (Russia) A Kudryavtsev	1	6^{8}
(Chinese Taipei) T Chen (Croatia) A Pavić	6	7^{10}
WC	(Kazakhstan) Evgeniy Danilov (Kazakhstan) B Zhukayev	4	4
WC	(Kazakhstan) Sagadat Ayap (Kazakhstan) G Lomakin	6	6
(Germany) Jeremy Jahn (Germany) D Masur	5	3
(Kazakhstan) T Khabibulin (Kazakhstan) A Nedovyesov	7	6
(Russia) Alexander Igoshin (Russia) E Karlovskiy	2	1
4	(Russia) D Matsukevich (Ukraine) D Molchanov	6	6
(Estonia) V Ivanov (Russia) A Vatutin	6	6
(Russia) A Bublik (Kazakhstan) A Golubev	4	3
(Serbia) N Milojević (Kazakhstan) D Popko	4	7^{7}	[10]
2	(Belarus) Y Shyla (Belarus) A Vasilevski	6	6^{5}	[12]

Quarterfinals
1	(Russia) M Elgin (Uzbekistan) D Istomin	6	6
(Japan) Y Kibi (South Korea) S-w Kwon	4	1
(Chinese Taipei) T Chen (Croatia) A Pavić	6^{6}	6	[10]
WC	(Kazakhstan) S Ayap (Kazakhstan) G Lomakin	7^{8}	4	[4]
(Kazakhstan) T Khabibulin (Kazakhstan) A Nedovyesov	6	6
4	(Russia) D Matsukevich (Ukraine) D Molchanov	2	1
(Estonia) V Ivanov (Russia) A Vatutin	5	5
2	(Belarus) Y Shyla (Belarus) A Vasilevski	7	7

Semifinals
1	(Russia) M Elgin (Uzbekistan) D Istomin	6	7
(Chinese Taipei) T Chen (Croatia) A Pavić	1	5
(Kazakhstan) T Khabibulin (Kazakhstan) A Nedovyesov	3	7	[11]
2	(Belarus) Y Shyla (Belarus) A Vasilevski	6	5	[9]

Final
1	(Russia) M Elgin (Uzbekistan) D Istomin	6^{7}	2
(Kazakhstan) T Khabibulin (Kazakhstan) A Nedovyesov	7^{9}	6
