= 2018 Chengdu Open – Singles =

Singles
- 2018 Chengdu Open

Final
- Champion: (Australia) Bernard Tomic
- Runner-up: (Italy) Fabio Fognini
- Score: 6–1, 3–6, 7–6^{(9–7)}

Details
- Draw: 28 (4 Q / 3 WC )

Events
| Singles | Doubles |
| ← 2017 · | Chengdu Open | · 2019 → |

Denis Istomin was the defending champion, but chose not to participate this year.

Bernard Tomic won the title, defeating Fabio Fognini in the final, 6–1, 3–6, 7–6^{(9–7)}.

== Seeds ==
The top four seeds receive a bye into the second round.

1. (Italy) Fabio Fognini (final)
2. (South Korea) Chung Hyeon (second round)
3. (Georgia (country)) Nikoloz Basilashvili (second round)
4. (France) Adrian Mannarino (second round)
5. (France) Gaël Monfils (first round)
6. (Australia) Matthew Ebden (quarterfinals)
7. (Portugal) João Sousa (semifinals)
8. (United States) Tennys Sandgren (first round)

== Draw ==
=== Key ===
- Q = Qualifier
- WC = Wild card
- LL = Lucky loser
- Alt = Alternate
- SE = Special exempt
- PR = Protected ranking
- ITF = ITF entry
- JE = Junior exempt
- w/o = Walkover
- r = Retired
- d = Defaulted
- SR = Special ranking

=== Finals ===
Semifinals
1 | (Italy) Fabio Fognini | 6^{5} | 6 | 6
(United States) Taylor Fritz | 7^{7} | 0 | 3
7 | (Portugal) João Sousa | 4 | 4
Q | (Australia) Bernard Tomic | 6 | 6

Finals
1 | (Italy) Fabio Fognini | 1 | 6 | 6^{7}
Q | (Australia) Bernard Tomic | 6 | 3 | 7^{9}

=== Top half ===
First round
(Germany) M Zverev | 3 | 0^{r}
Q | (Belgium) R Bemelmans | 6 | 2
Q | (India) P Gunneswaran | 3 | 4
(Italy) M Berrettini | 6 | 6
(Russia) E Donskoy | 3 | 4
6 | (Australia) M Ebden | 6 | 6
(Argentina) G Pella | 6^{6} | 1
(United States) S Querrey | 7^{8} | 6
(United States) T Fritz | 3 | 6 | 6
WC | (Chinese Taipei) C-h Tseng | 6 | 3 | 4
(Kazakhstan) M Kukushkin | 6 | 6
8 | (United States) T Sandgren | 4 | 3

Second round
1 | (Italy) F Fognini | 6 | 7^{7}
Q | (Belgium) R Bemelmans | 4 | 6^{2}
(Italy) M Berrettini | 3 | 6 | 6^{3}
6 | (Australia) M Ebden | 6 | 3 | 7^{7}
3 | (Georgia (country)) N Basilashvili | 1 | 4
(United States) S Querrey | 6 | 6
(United States) T Fritz | 7 | 6
(Kazakhstan) M Kukushkin | 5 | 1

Quarterfinals
1 | (Italy) F Fognini | 6 | 6
6 | (Australia) M Ebden | 4 | 2
(United States) S Querrey | 6^{1} | 5
(United States) T Fritz | 7^{7} | 7

Semifinals
1 | (Italy) F Fognini | 6^{5} | 6 | 6
(United States) T Fritz | 7^{7} | 0 | 3

=== Bottom half ===
First round
7 | (Portugal) J Sousa | 7^{7} | 6^{7} | 6
(United States) T Smyczek | 6^{1} | 7^{9} | 3
(Moldova) R Albot | 3 | 4
(Canada) V Pospisil | 6 | 6
(Cyprus) M Baghdatis | 6^{7} | 6 | 2
(Tunisia) M Jaziri | 7^{9} | 1 | 6
5 | (France) G Monfils | 6 | 2 | 1
Q | (South Africa) L Harris | 3 | 6 | 6
(United States) B Klahn | 7^{8} | 6^{3} | 2
Q | (Australia) B Tomic | 6^{6} | 7^{7} | 6
LL | (Canada) F Auger-Aliassime | 6 | 6^{2} | 6
WC | (China) Y Wu | 3 | 7^{7} | 1

Second round
7 | (Portugal) J Sousa | 6^{4} | 6 | 7^{7}
(Canada) V Pospisil | 7^{7} | 4 | 6^{0}
(Tunisia) M Jaziri | 6 | 7^{7}
4 | (France) A Mannarino | 3 | 6^{5}
Q | (South Africa) L Harris | 6^{5} | 6 | 6^{6}
Q | (Australia) B Tomic | 7^{7} | 2 | 7^{8}
LL | (Canada) F Auger-Aliassime | 7^{7} | 5 | 6
2 | (South Korea) H Chung | 6^{2} | 7 | 4

Quarterfinals
7 | (Portugal) J Sousa | 6 | 3 | 6
(Tunisia) M Jaziri | 1 | 6 | 3
Q | (Australia) B Tomic | 6 | 6
LL | (Canada) F Auger-Aliassime | 2 | 4

Semifinals
7 | (Portugal) J Sousa | 4 | 4
Q | (Australia) B Tomic | 6 | 6

== Qualifying ==
=== Seeds ===
1. (Australia) Jason Kubler (first round)
2. (Belgium) Ruben Bemelmans (qualified)
3. (Australia) Bernard Tomic (qualified)
4. (South Africa) Lloyd Harris (qualified)
5. (Canada) Félix Auger-Aliassime (qualifying competition, lucky loser)
6. (Latvia) Ernests Gulbis (first round)
7. (India) Prajnesh Gunneswaran (qualified)
8. (Serbia) Miomir Kecmanović (qualifying competition)

=== Qualifiers ===
1. (India) Prajnesh Gunneswaran
2. (Belgium) Ruben Bemelmans
3. (Australia) Bernard Tomic
4. (South Africa) Lloyd Harris

=== Lucky loser ===
1. (Canada) Félix Auger-Aliassime

=== Qualifying draw ===
==== First qualifier ====
First round
1 | (Australia) Jason Kubler | 4 | 6 | 3
(Japan) Hiroki Moriya | 6 | 3 | 6
WC | (China) Xia Zihao | 2 | 5
7 | (India) Prajnesh Gunneswaran | 6 | 7

Qualifying competition
(Japan) Hiroki Moriya | 4 | 3
7 | (India) Prajnesh Gunneswaran | 6 | 6

==== Second qualifier ====
First round
2 | (Belgium) Ruben Bemelmans | 6 | 6
WC | (China) Te Rigele | 3 | 3
Alt | (Japan) Yusuke Takahashi | 3 | 2
5 | (Canada) Félix Auger-Aliassime | 6 | 6

Qualifying competition
2 | (Belgium) Ruben Bemelmans | 7^{7} | 6
5 | (Canada) Félix Auger-Aliassime | 6^{4} | 2

==== Third qualifier ====
First round
3 | (Australia) Bernard Tomic | 6 | 6
(Japan) Renta Tokuda | 3 | 4
PR | (Belarus) Egor Gerasimov | 6 | 6
6 | (Latvia) Ernests Gulbis | 4 | 1

Qualifying competition
3 | (Australia) Bernard Tomic | 6^{5} | 6 | 7^{7}
PR | (Belarus) Egor Gerasimov | 7^{7} | 3 | 6^{4}

==== Fourth qualifier ====
First round
4 | (South Africa) Lloyd Harris | 6 | 7
(Russia) Ivan Nedelko | 2 | 5
(Japan) Yosuke Watanuki | 0 | 2
8 | (Serbia) Miomir Kecmanović | 6 | 6

Qualifying competition
4 | (South Africa) Lloyd Harris | 6 | 6
8 | (Serbia) Miomir Kecmanović | 4 | 2
