= 2026 Chengdu Open – Doubles =

Doubles
- 2026 Chengdu Open

Final
- Champions: (United Kingdom) Luke Johnson (Poland) Jan Zieliński
- Runners-up: (United States) Robert Galloway (Sweden) André Göransson
- Score: 7–6^{(9–7)}, 7–5

Details
- Draw: 16 (2WC)
- Seeds: 8

Events
Singles	Doubles
- Chengdu Open

Luke Johnson and Jan Zieliński defeated Robert Galloway and André Göransson in the final, 7–6^{(9–7)}, 7–5 to win the doubles tennis title at the 2026 Chengdu Open.

Constantin Frantzen and Robin Haase were the defending champions, but lost in the first round to Robert Cash and Alexander Erler.

== Seeds ==
1. (France) Théo Arribagé / (France) Albano Olivetti (semifinals)
2. (France) Sadio Doumbia / (France) Fabien Reboul (first round)
3. (Germany) Jakob Schnaitter / (Germany) Mark Wallner (semifinals)
4. (United States) Robert Galloway / (Sweden) André Göransson (final)

== Draw ==
Key

- Q = Qualifier
- WC = Wild card
- LL = Lucky loser
- Alt = Alternate
- ITF = ITF entry
- PR = Protected ranking
- SR = Special ranking
- SE = Special exempt
- JE = Junior exempt
- JR = Junior Accelerator Programme entrant
- CO = College Accelerator Programme entrant
- NG = Next Gen Accelerator Program entrant
- w/o = Walkover
- r = Retired
- d = Defaulted

First round
1	(France) T Arribagé (France) A Olivetti	7	7
(Ecuador) G Escobar (India) N Kaliyanda Poonacha	5	5
WC	(China) J Hu (China) H Lu	4	6	[8]
WC	(China) A Wang (China) Y Zhou	6	3	[10]
4	(United States) R Galloway (Sweden) A Göransson	6	6
(France) A Mannarino (France) A Müller	4	3
(United States) R Cash (Austria) A Erler	6	4	[10]
(Germany) C Frantzen (Netherlands) R Haase	4	6	[5]
Alt	(Australia) B Bayldon (Australia) T Fancutt	6^{6}	6^{3}
(Brazil) M Melo (United States) R Seggerman	7^{8}	7^{7}
Alt	P Bar Biryukov (Kazakhstan) G Lomakin	4	6^{8}
3	(Germany) J Schnaitter (Germany) M Wallner	6	7^{10}
(Australia) J Peers (New Zealand) M Venus	7^{10}	5	[12]
(United Kingdom) D Stevenson (United Kingdom) M Willis	6^{8}	7	[10]
(United Kingdom) L Johnson (Poland) J Zieliński	4	6	[10]
2	(France) S Doumbia (France) F Reboul	6	4	[3]

Quarterfinals
1	(France) T Arribagé (France) A Olivetti	6	6^{4}	[11]
WC	(China) A Wang (China) Y Zhou	4	7^{7}	[9]
4	(United States) R Galloway (Sweden) A Göransson	7	7
(United States) R Cash (Austria) A Erler	5	5
(Brazil) M Melo (United States) R Seggerman	6^{4}	6^{7}
3	(Germany) J Schnaitter (Germany) M Wallner	7^{7}	7^{9}
(Australia) J Peers (New Zealand) M Venus	6	3	[7]
(United Kingdom) L Johnson (Poland) J Zieliński	2	6	[10]

Semifinals
1	(France) T Arribagé (France) A Olivetti	4	6	[4]
4	(United States) R Galloway (Sweden) A Göransson	6	4	[10]
3	(Germany) J Schnaitter (Germany) M Wallner	3	2
(United Kingdom) L Johnson (Poland) J Zieliński	6	6

Final
4	(United States) R Galloway (Sweden) A Göransson	6^{7}	5
(United Kingdom) L Johnson (Poland) J Zieliński	7^{9}	7
