= 2019 Chengdu Open =

- Date: September 23–29
- Edition: 4th
- Category: ATP Tour 250 series
- Draw: 28S / 16D
- Surface: Hard / outdoor
- Location: Chengdu, China

Champions

Singles
- (Spain) Pablo Carreno Busta

Doubles
- (Serbia) Nikola Ćaćić / (Serbia) Dušan Lajović
← 2018 ·	Chengdu Open	· 2023 →

The 2019 Chengdu Open was a men's tennis tournament played on outdoor hard courts. It was the 4th edition of the Chengdu Open and part of the ATP Tour 250 series of the 2019 ATP Tour. It took place at the Sichuan International Tennis Center in Chengdu, China, from September 23 to 29.

== Singles main-draw entrants ==
=== Seeds ===
Country	Player	Rank^{1}	Seed
USA	John Isner	20	1
CAN	Félix Auger-Aliassime	21	2
FRA	Benoît Paire	23	3
BUL	Grigor Dimitrov	25	4
SRB	Dušan Lajović	29	5
USA	Taylor Fritz	30	6
GRB	Kyle Edmund	32	7
CAN	Denis Shapovalov	33	8

- ^{1} Rankings are as of September 16, 2019

=== Other entrants ===
The following players received wildcards into the singles main draw:

- (China) Bai Yan
- (South Korea) Chung Hyeon
- (China) Li Zhe

The following player received entry using a protected ranking into the singles main draw:

- (Canada) Vasek Pospisil

The following player received entry as a special exempt:

- (Belarus) Egor Gerasimov

The following players received entry from the qualifying draw:

- (Chinese Taipei) Jason Jung
- (United States) Bradley Klahn
- (Poland) ~~Kamil Majchrzak~~
- (Australia) Alexei Popyrin

The following player received entry as a lucky loser:

- (South Africa) Lloyd Harris

=== Withdrawals ===
- (France) Richard Gasquet → replaced by (Canada) Vasek Pospisil
- (Kazakhstan) Mikhail Kukushkin → replaced by (Lithuania) Ričardas Berankis
- (Poland) Kamil Majchrzak → replaced by (South Africa) Lloyd Harris
- (United States) Reilly Opelka → replaced by (Kazakhstan) Alexander Bublik
- (United States) Sam Querrey → replaced by (Hungary) Márton Fucsovics

== Doubles main-draw entrants ==
=== Seeds ===
Country	Player	Country	Player	Rank^{1}	Seed
CRO	Ivan Dodig	SVK	Filip Polášek	53	1
GBR	Dominic Inglot	USA	Austin Krajicek	85	2
MEX	Santiago González	SWE	Robert Lindstedt	111	3
ISR	Jonathan Erlich	FRA	Fabrice Martin	129	4

- Rankings are as of September 16, 2019

=== Other entrants ===
The following pairs received wildcards into the doubles main draw:

- (China) Li Zhe / (China) Gao Xin
- (China) Sun Fajing / (China) Wang Aoran

== Champions ==
=== Singles ===
- (Spain) Pablo Carreño Busta def. (Kazakhstan) Alexander Bublik, 6–7^{(5–7)}, 6–4, 7–6^{(7–3)}

=== Doubles ===
- (Serbia) Nikola Ćaćić / (Serbia) Dušan Lajović def. (Israel) Jonathan Erlich / (France) Fabrice Martin, 7–6^{(11–9)}, 3–6, [10–3]
