= 2025 Chengdu Open =

- Date: 17–23 September
- Edition: 7th
- Category: ATP 250 tournaments
- Draw: 28S / 16D
- Surface: Hard / outdoor
- Location: Chengdu, China

Champions

Singles
- (Chile) Alejandro Tabilo

Doubles
- (Germany) Constantin Frantzen / (Netherlands) Robin Haase
← 2024 ·	Chengdu Open	· 2026 →

The 2025 Chengdu Open was a men's tennis tournament played on outdoor hard courts. It was the seventh edition of the Chengdu Open and an ATP 250 tournament on the 2025 ATP Tour. It took place at the Sichuan International Tennis Center in Chengdu, China, from 17 to 23 September 2025.

== Champions ==
=== Singles ===
- (Chile) Alejandro Tabilo def. (Italy) Lorenzo Musetti, 6–3, 2–6, 7–6^{(7–5)}

=== Doubles ===
- (Germany) Constantin Frantzen / (Netherlands) Robin Haase def. (United States) Vasil Kirkov / (Netherlands) Bart Stevens, 4–6, 6–3, [10–7]

== Singles main-draw entrants ==
=== Seeds ===
Country	Player	Rank^{1}	Seed
ITA	Lorenzo Musetti	9	1
ITA	Luciano Darderi	30	2
NED	Tallon Griekspoor	31	3
USA	Brandon Nakashima	33	4
GBR	Cameron Norrie	34	5
FRA	Giovanni Mpetshi Perricard	36	6
~~ARG~~	~~Sebastián Báez~~	~~41~~	~~7~~
ITA	Lorenzo Sonego	44	8

- ^{1} Rankings are as of 15 September 2025

=== Other entrants ===
The following players received wildcards into the singles main draw:

- (China) Shang Juncheng
- (Hong Kong) Coleman Wong
- (China) Zhou Yi

The following player received entry through the Next Gen Accelerator program:

- (Croatia) Dino Prižmić

The following players received entry from the qualifying draw:

- (Georgia (country)) Nikoloz Basilashvili
- (Japan) Taro Daniel
- (United States) Mackenzie McDonald
- (Chile) Alejandro Tabilo

The following player received entry as a lucky loser:

- (United Kingdom) Billy Harris

=== Withdrawals ===
- (Germany) Daniel Altmaier → replaced by (Kazakhstan) Alexander Shevchenko
- (Argentina) Sebastián Báez → replaced by (United Kingdom) Billy Harris
- (Portugal) Nuno Borges → replaced by (Australia) Christopher O'Connell
- (United Kingdom) Jack Draper → replaced by (Argentina) Juan Manuel Cerúndolo
- (United Kingdom) Jacob Fearnley → replaced by (Austria) Filip Misolic
- (Serbia) Miomir Kecmanović → replaced by (United States) Ethan Quinn
- (France) Alexandre Müller → replaced by (France) Térence Atmane
- (Spain) Jaume Munar → replaced by (France) Quentin Halys

== Doubles main-draw entrants ==
=== Seeds ===
Country	Player	Country	Player	Rank^{1}	Seed
USA	Christian Harrison	USA	Evan King	33	1
FRA	Sadio Doumbia	FRA	Fabien Reboul	48	2
AUT	Alexander Erler	USA	Robert Galloway	73	3
GBR	Luke Johnson	USA	Austin Krajicek	87	4

- ^{1} Rankings are as of 15 September 2025

=== Other entrants ===
The following pairs received wildcards into the doubles main draw:

- (China) Cui Jie / (China) Te Rigele
- (China) Wang Aoran / (China) Zhou Yi

The following pairs received entry as alternates:

- (India) Siddhant Banthia / (India) Ramkumar Ramanathan
- (Australia) Tristan Schoolkate / (Australia) Bernard Tomic

=== Withdrawals ===
- (Italy) Luciano Darderi / (Chile) Alejandro Tabilo → replaced by (India) Siddhant Banthia / (India) Ramkumar Ramanathan
- (Netherlands) Tallon Griekspoor / (Italy) Lorenzo Sonego → replaced by (Australia) Tristan Schoolkate / (Australia) Bernard Tomic
