= 2018 Chengdu Open – Doubles =

Doubles
- 2018 Chengdu Open

Final
- Champions: (Croatia) Ivan Dodig (Croatia) Mate Pavić
- Runners-up: (United States) Austin Krajicek (India) Jeevan Nedunchezhiyan
- Score: 6–2, 6–4

Events
Singles	Doubles
← 2017 ·	Chengdu Open	· 2019 →

Jonathan Erlich and Aisam-ul-Haq Qureshi were the defending champions but chose not to participate together. Erlich played alongside James Cerretani, but lost in the first round to Guido Pella and João Sousa. Qureshi teamed up with Santiago González and lost in the semifinals to Ivan Dodig and Mate Pavić.

Dodig and Pavić went on to win the title, defeating Austin Krajicek and Jeevan Nedunchezhiyan in the final, 6–2, 6–4.

== Seeds ==
1. (Croatia) Ivan Dodig / (Croatia) Mate Pavić (champions)
2. (Chile) Julio Peralta / (Argentina) Horacio Zeballos (first round)
3. (India) Divij Sharan / (New Zealand) Artem Sitak (first round)
4. (Mexico) Santiago González / (Pakistan) Aisam-ul-Haq Qureshi (semifinals)

== Draw ==
=== Key ===
- Q = Qualifier
- WC = Wild card
- LL = Lucky loser
- Alt = Alternate
- SE = Special exempt
- PR = Protected ranking
- ITF = ITF entry
- JE = Junior exempt
- w/o = Walkover
- r = Retired
- d = Defaulted
- SR = Special ranking

=== Draw ===
First round
1	(Croatia) I Dodig (Croatia) M Pavić	4	6	[10]
(India) L Paes (Mexico) MÁ Reyes-Varela	6	3	[5]
WC	(China) M Gong (China) Ze Zhang	6^{6}	7^{7}	[8]
(Ukraine) D Molchanov (Slovakia) I Zelenay	7^{8}	6^{4}	[10]
4	(Mexico) S González (Pakistan) A-u-H Qureshi	6	4	[10]
(United States) T Fritz (United States) B Klahn	2	6	[2]
(Australia) M Ebden (Germany) M Zverev	6	6
WC	(China) X Gao (China) R Te	3	2
(Moldova) R Albot (Tunisia) M Jaziri	2	3
Alt	(Belgium) R Bemelmans (India) P Gunneswaran	6	6
(United States) A Krajicek (India) J Nedunchezhiyan	3	7^{7}	[10]
3	(India) D Sharan (New Zealand) A Sitak	6	6^{2}	[7]
(Argentina) G Pella (Portugal) J Sousa	7	6
(United States) J Cerretani (Israel) J Erlich	5	3
(India) S Balaji (India) R Bopanna	6	5	[10]
2	(Chile) J Peralta (Argentina) H Zeballos	1	7	[8]

Quarterfinals
1	(Croatia) I Dodig (Croatia) M Pavić	3	6	[10]
(Ukraine) D Molchanov (Slovakia) I Zelenay	6	3	[4]
4	(Mexico) S González (Pakistan) A-u-H Qureshi	6	6
(Australia) M Ebden (Germany) M Zverev	4	0
Alt	(Belgium) R Bemelmans (India) P Gunneswaran	3	5
(United States) A Krajicek (India) J Nedunchezhiyan	6	7
(Argentina) G Pella (Portugal) J Sousa	7^{7}	6
(India) S Balaji (India) R Bopanna	6^{1}	3

Semifinals
1	(Croatia) I Dodig (Croatia) M Pavić	5	6	[10]
4	(Mexico) S González (Pakistan) A-u-H Qureshi	7	4	[8]
(United States) A Krajicek (India) J Nedunchezhiyan	7	6
(Argentina) G Pella (Portugal) J Sousa	5	1

Final
1	(Croatia) I Dodig (Croatia) M Pavić	6	6
(United States) A Krajicek (India) J Nedunchezhiyan	2	4
