= 2016 Chengdu Open – Singles =

Singles
- 2016 Chengdu Open

Final
- Champion: (Russia) Karen Khachanov
- Runner-up: (Spain) Albert Ramos Viñolas
- Score: 6−7^{(4−7)}, 7−6^{(7−3)}, 6−3

Details
- Draw: 28
- Seeds: 8

Events
Singles	Doubles
Chengdu Open	· 2017 →

This was the first edition of the tournament. Karen Khachanov won his first ATP World Tour title, defeating Albert Ramos Viñolas in the final, 6−7^{(4−7)}, 7−6^{(7−3)}, 6−3.

== Seeds ==
The top four seeds receive a bye into the second round.

1. (Austria) Dominic Thiem (quarterfinals)
2. (Australia) Nick Kyrgios (second round)
3. (Bulgaria) Grigor Dimitrov (semifinals)
4. (Spain) Feliciano López (quarterfinals)
5. (Spain) Albert Ramos Viñolas (final)
6. (Serbia) Viktor Troicki (semifinals)
7. (Portugal) João Sousa (first round)
8. (Italy) Paolo Lorenzi (second round)

== Draw ==
=== Key ===
- Q = Qualifier
- WC = Wild card
- LL = Lucky loser
- Alt = Alternate
- SE = Special exempt
- PR = Protected ranking
- ITF = ITF entry
- JE = Junior exempt
- w/o = Walkover
- r = Retired
- d = Defaulted
- SR = Special ranking

=== Finals ===
Semifinals
5	(Spain) Albert Ramos Viñolas	7^{8}	1	7^{7}
3	(Bulgaria) Grigor Dimitrov	6^{6}	6	6^{3}
(Russia) Karen Khachanov	6	7
6	(Serbia) Viktor Troicki	3	5

Final
5	(Spain) Albert Ramos Viñolas	7^{7}	6^{3}	3
(Russia) Karen Khachanov	6^{4}	7^{7}	6

=== Top half ===
First round
(Russia) K Kravchuk	3	2
WC	(China) D Wu	6	6
Q	(Czech Republic) R Štěpánek	3	4
(Chinese Taipei) Y-h Lu	6	6
Q	(Germany) M Berrer	4	7	3
5	(Spain) A Ramos Viñolas	6	5	6
(Serbia) D Lajović	1	6	6
(Argentina) F Delbonis	6	3	4
(United States) R Ram	4	5
(Argentina) D Schwartzman	6	7
(Australia) J Millman	4	6	1
8	(Italy) P Lorenzi	6	3	6

Second round
1/WC	(Austria) D Thiem	6	6
WC	(China) D Wu	4	4
(Chinese Taipei) Y-h Lu	6^{4}	6	4
5	(Spain) A Ramos Viñolas	7^{7}	3	6
3	(Bulgaria) G Dimitrov	7^{7}	6
(Serbia) D Lajović	6^{1}	4
(Argentina) D Schwartzman	6	6
8	(Italy) P Lorenzi	0	4

Quarterfinals
1/WC	(Austria) D Thiem	1	4
5	(Spain) A Ramos Viñolas	6	6
3	(Bulgaria) G Dimitrov	4	6	6
(Argentina) D Schwartzman	6	4	3

Semifinals
5	(Spain) A Ramos Viñolas	7^{8}	1	7^{7}
3	(Bulgaria) G Dimitrov	6^{6}	6	6^{3}

=== Bottom half ===
First round
7	(Portugal) J Sousa	6^{3}	3
(Russia) K Khachanov	7^{7}	6
(France) A Mannarino	6	6^{2}	6
Q	(United States) D Kudla	4	7^{7}	4
PR	(Argentina) J Mónaco	6	6
Q	(Japan) H Moriya	1	2
6	(Serbia) V Troicki	6	7^{7}
WC	(Norway) C Ruud	3	6^{4}
(Cyprus) M Baghdatis	6^{5}	7^{7}	7^{7}
(Spain) P Carreño Busta	7^{7}	6^{5}	6^{5}
(South Africa) K Anderson	6	6
(Australia) J Thompson	2	4

Second round
(Russia) K Khachanov	3	6	6
(France) A Mannarino	6	3	1
PR	(Argentina) J Mónaco	3	5
4	(Spain) F López	6	7
6	(Serbia) V Troicki	6	4	6
(Cyprus) M Baghdatis	3	6	2
(South Africa) K Anderson	3	7^{8}	6
2	(Australia) N Kyrgios	6	6^{6}	2

Quarterfinals
(Russia) K Khachanov	6	6
4	(Spain) F López	3	4
6	(Serbia) V Troicki	6	7^{7}
(South Africa) K Anderson	3	6^{4}

Semifinals
(Russia) K Khachanov	6	7
6	(Serbia) V Troicki	3	5

== Qualifying ==
=== Seeds ===
1. (United States) Jared Donaldson (first round)
2. (Czech Republic) Radek Štěpánek (qualified)
3. (Canada) Vasek Pospisil (qualifying competition)
4. (United States) Denis Kudla (qualified)
5. (Japan) Go Soeda (qualifying competition)
6. (Germany) Michael Berrer (qualified)
7. (Japan) Hiroki Moriya (qualified)
8. (Italy) Matteo Donati (qualifying competition)

=== Qualifiers ===
1. (Japan) Hiroki Moriya
2. (Czech Republic) Radek Štěpánek
3. (Germany) Michael Berrer
4. (United States) Denis Kudla

=== Qualifying draw ===
==== First qualifier ====
First round
1	(United States) Jared Donaldson	5	4
(Australia) Marinko Matosevic	7	6
(Japan) Shuichi Sekiguchi	6	3	5
7	(Japan) Hiroki Moriya	4	6	7

Qualifying competition
(Australia) Marinko Matosevic	6	6^{6}	3
7	(Japan) Hiroki Moriya	2	7^{8}	6

==== Second qualifier ====
First round
2	(Czech Republic) Radek Štěpánek	7^{7}	6
(Japan) Takuto Niki	6^{4}	2
WC	(China) Wang Chuhan	4	2
5	(Japan) Go Soeda	6	6

Qualifying competition
2	(Czech Republic) Radek Štěpánek	6	7
5	(Japan) Go Soeda	3	5

==== Third qualifier ====
First round
3	(Canada) Vasek Pospisil	6	7^{7}
(South Korea) Kwon Soon-woo	1	6^{4}
(New Zealand) Artem Sitak	5	0^{r}
6	(Germany) Michael Berrer	7	2	6

Qualifying competition
3	(Canada) Vasek Pospisil	4	6	3
6	(Germany) Michael Berrer	6	1	6

==== Fourth qualifier ====
First round
4	(United States) Denis Kudla	6	6
Alt	(China) Sun Fajing	4	1
WC	(China) Zhong Suhao	0	1
8	(Italy) Matteo Donati	6	6

Qualifying competition
4	(United States) Denis Kudla	6	6
8	(Italy) Matteo Donati	1	3
