= 2017 Chengdu Open – Singles =

Singles
- 2017 Chengdu Open

Final
- Champion: (Uzbekistan) Denis Istomin
- Runner-up: (Cyprus) Marcos Baghdatis
- Score: 3–2 ret.

Details
- Draw: 28 (4 Q / 3 WC )
- Seeds: 8

Events
| Singles | Doubles |
| ← 2016 · | Chengdu Open | · 2018 → |

Karen Khachanov was the defending champion but lost in the second round to Denis Istomin.

Istomin won the title when Marcos Baghdatis retired in the final with a back injury, down 2–3.

== Seeds ==
The top four seeds receive a bye into the second round.

1. (Austria) Dominic Thiem (second round)
2. (Spain) Albert Ramos Viñolas (second round)
3. (Russia) Karen Khachanov (second round)
4. (Russia) Andrey Rublev (second round)
5. (Japan) Yūichi Sugita (semifinals)
6. (United Kingdom) Kyle Edmund (second round)
7. (Serbia) Viktor Troicki (first round)
8. (Argentina) Leonardo Mayer (first round)

== Draw ==
=== Key ===
- Q = Qualifier
- WC = Wild card
- LL = Lucky loser
- Alt = Alternate
- ITF = ITF entry
- PR = Protected ranking
- SR = Special ranking
- SE = Special exempt
- JE = Junior exempt
- JR = Junior Accelerator Programme entrant
- CO = College Accelerator Programme entrant
- NG = Next Gen Accelerator Program entrant
- w/o = Walkover
- r = Retired
- d = Defaulted

=== Finals ===
Semifinals
(Argentina) Guido Pella | 7 | 4 | 2
(Cyprus) Marcos Baghdatis | 5 | 6 | 6
(Uzbekistan) Denis Istomin | 6 | 6^{4} | 6
5 | (Japan) Yūichi Sugita | 2 | 7^{7} | 0

Final
(Cyprus) Marcos Baghdatis | 2^{r}
(Uzbekistan) Denis Istomin | 3

=== Top half ===
First round
(Argentina) G Pella | 6 | 7^{7}
(Croatia) B Ćorić | 4 | 6^{2}
WC | (China) D Wu | 5 | 1
Q | (United States) T Fritz | 7 | 6
(Georgia (country)) N Basilashvili | 6 | 2 | 6
7 | (Serbia) V Troicki | 3 | 6 | 2
(Chinese Taipei) Y-h Lu | 6 | 6
WC | (Sweden) M Ymer | 2 | 3
(Cyprus) M Baghdatis | 6^{4} | 7^{7} | 6
(Canada) V Pospisil | 7^{7} | 6^{5} | 4
SE | (Germany) P Gojowczyk | 6 | 6
8 | (Argentina) L Mayer | 2 | 2

Second round
1 | (Austria) D Thiem | 6^{6} | 4
(Argentina) G Pella | 7^{8} | 6
Q | (United States) T Fritz | 6 | 3 | 6
(Georgia (country)) N Basilashvili | 3 | 6 | 1
4 | (Russia) A Rublev | 2 | 1
(Chinese Taipei) Y-h Lu | 6 | 6
(Cyprus) M Baghdatis | 5 | 6 | 6
SE | (Germany) P Gojowczyk | 7 | 3 | 2

Quarterfinals
(Argentina) G Pella | 6 | 7^{7}
Q | (United States) T Fritz | 3 | 6^{3}
(Chinese Taipei) Y-h Lu | 3 | 2
(Cyprus) M Baghdatis | 6 | 6

Semifinals
(Argentina) G Pella | 7 | 4 | 2
(Cyprus) M Baghdatis | 5 | 6 | 6

=== Bottom half ===
First round
6 | (United Kingdom) K Edmund | 6 | 6
(Australia) B Tomic | 4 | 2
(United States) J Donaldson | 6^{2} | 7 | 7
Q | (Greece) S Tsitsipas | 7^{7} | 5 | 5
(Uzbekistan) D Istomin | 6 | 7^{7}
(Germany) J-L Struff | 3 | 6^{3}
5 | (Japan) Y Sugita | 6 | 0
Q | (Croatia) M Pavić | 1 | 0^{r}
(Brazil) T Monteiro | 1 | 7^{8} | 6
WC | (China) Y Wu | 6 | 6^{6} | 2
(Serbia) D Lajović | 6 | 7^{7}
Q | (Spain) A Menéndez Maceiras | 3 | 6^{3}

Second round
6 | (United Kingdom) K Edmund | 0 | 6 | 4
(United States) J Donaldson | 6 | 1 | 6
(Uzbekistan) D Istomin | 6 | 6
3 | (Russia) K Khachanov | 3 | 2
5 | (Japan) Y Sugita | 6 | 6
(Brazil) T Monteiro | 4 | 1
(Serbia) D Lajović | 6 | 6
2 | (Spain) A Ramos Viñolas | 2 | 3

Quarterfinals
(United States) J Donaldson | 6 | 5 | 6^{5}
(Uzbekistan) D Istomin | 2 | 7 | 7^{7}
5 | (Japan) Y Sugita | 6 | 6
(Serbia) D Lajović | 2 | 4

Semifinals
(Uzbekistan) D Istomin | 6 | 6^{4} | 6
5 | (Japan) Y Sugita | 2 | 7^{7} | 0

== Qualifying ==
=== Seeds ===
1. (United States) Taylor Fritz (qualified)
2. (Greece) Stefanos Tsitsipas (qualified)
3. (Spain) Adrián Menéndez Maceiras (qualified)
4. (Australia) Bernard Tomic (moved to main draw)
5. (Japan) Yasutaka Uchiyama (first round)
6. (United States) Marcos Giron (qualifying competition)
7. (Switzerland) Marco Chiudinelli (qualifying competition)
8. (New Zealand) José Statham (first round)

=== Qualifiers ===
1. (United States) Taylor Fritz
2. (Greece) Stefanos Tsitsipas
3. (Spain) Adrián Menéndez Maceiras
4. (Croatia) Mate Pavić

=== Qualifying draw ===
==== First qualifier ====
First round
1 | (United States) Taylor Fritz | 6 | 6
Alt | (Pakistan) Aisam-ul-Haq Qureshi | 3 | 4
Alt | (Austria) Oliver Marach | 5 | 0^{r}
7 | (Switzerland) Marco Chiudinelli | 7 | 1

Qualifying competition
1 | (United States) Taylor Fritz | 6 | 6
7 | (Switzerland) Marco Chiudinelli | 4 | 2

==== Second qualifier ====
First round
2 | (Greece) Stefanos Tsitsipas | 6 | 6
WC | (China) Sun Fajing | 4 | 2
(Japan) Takuto Niki | 2 | 5
6 | (United States) Marcos Giron | 6 | 7

Qualifying competition
2 | (Greece) Stefanos Tsitsipas | 6 | 6
6 | (United States) Marcos Giron | 1 | 2

==== Third qualifier ====
First round
3 | (Spain) Adrián Menéndez Maceiras | 6 | 6
Alt | (China) Te Rigele | 4 | 1
(China) Wang Chuhan | 6 | 6
8 | (New Zealand) José Statham | 2 | 2

Qualifying competition
3 | (Spain) Adrián Menéndez Maceiras | 6 | 6
(China) Wang Chuhan | 0 | 4

==== Fourth qualifier ====
First round
Alt | (New Zealand) Michael Venus | 6^{6} | 6^{4}
WC | (China) Xia Zihao | 7^{8} | 7^{7}
Alt | (Croatia) Mate Pavić | 6 | 5 | 7^{7}
5 | (Japan) Yasutaka Uchiyama | 3 | 7 | 6^{4}

Qualifying competition
WC | (China) Xia Zihao | 4 | 6^{8}
Alt | (Croatia) Mate Pavić | 6 | 7^{10}
