= 2019 Chengdu Open – Doubles =

Doubles
- 2019 Chengdu Open

Final
- Champions: (Serbia) Nikola Čačić (Serbia) Dušan Lajović
- Runners-up: (Israel) Jonathan Erlich (France) Fabrice Martin
- Score: 7–6^{(11–9)}, 3–6, [10–3]

Events
Singles	Doubles
← 2018 ·	Chengdu Open	· 2023 →

Ivan Dodig and Mate Pavić were the defending champions, but Pavić chose not to participate this year. Dodig played alongside Filip Polášek, but lost in the semifinals to Jonathan Erlich and Fabrice Martin.

Nikola Čačić and Dušan Lajović won the title, defeating Erlich and Martin in the final, 7–6^{(11–9)}, 3–6, [10–3].

== Seeds ==
1. (Croatia) Ivan Dodig / (Slovakia) Filip Polášek (semifinals)
2. (United Kingdom) Dominic Inglot / (United States) Austin Krajicek (quarterfinals)
3. (Mexico) Santiago González / (Sweden) Robert Lindstedt (first round)
4. (Israel) Jonathan Erlich / (France) Fabrice Martin (final)

== Draw ==
=== Key ===
- Q = Qualifier
- WC = Wild card
- LL = Lucky loser
- Alt = Alternate
- SE = Special exempt
- PR = Protected ranking
- ITF = ITF entry
- JE = Junior exempt
- w/o = Walkover
- r = Retired
- d = Defaulted
- SR = Special ranking

=== Draw ===
First round
1	(Croatia) I Dodig (Slovakia) F Polášek	6	6
(Czech Republic) R Jebavý (Slovakia) I Zelenay	4	4
(Moldova) R Albot (Portugal) J Sousa	6	6
(Kazakhstan) A Bublik (France) B Paire	1	1
4	(Israel) J Erlich (France) F Martin	4	6	[10]
(Chile) C Garín (Argentina) JI Londero	6	3	[5]
(United Kingdom) K Edmund (United Kingdom) D Evans	6	7
(Chinese Taipei) C-p Hsieh (Indonesia) C Rungkat	4	5
WC	(China) X Gao (China) Z Li	7	2	[10]
(Canada) D Shapovalov (Australia) J Thompson	5	6	[1]
(Serbia) N Čačić (Serbia) D Lajović	6^{3}	6	[10]
3	(Mexico) S González (Sweden) R Lindstedt	7^{7}	4	[6]
(United States) T Fritz (United States) N Monroe	6	6
(Lithuania) R Berankis (Hungary) M Fucsovics	4	1
WC	(China) F Sun (China) A Wang	1	6	[8]
2	(United Kingdom) D Inglot (United States) A Krajicek	6	0	[10]

Quarterfinals
1	(Croatia) I Dodig (Slovakia) F Polášek	6	6
(Moldova) R Albot (Portugal) J Sousa	4	3
4	(Israel) J Erlich (France) F Martin	6	3	[10]
(United Kingdom) K Edmund (United Kingdom) D Evans	4	6	[7]
WC	(China) X Gao (China) Z Li	6^{5}	3
(Serbia) N Čačić (Serbia) D Lajović	7^{7}	6
(United States) T Fritz (United States) N Monroe	7^{7}	6
2	(United Kingdom) D Inglot (United States) A Krajicek	6^{5}	2

Semifinals
1	(Croatia) I Dodig (Slovakia) F Polášek	2	7	[8]
4	(Israel) J Erlich (France) F Martin	6	5	[10]
(Serbia) N Čačić (Serbia) D Lajović	6	6
(United States) T Fritz (United States) N Monroe	4	4

Final
4	(Israel) J Erlich (France) F Martin	6^{9}	6	[3]
(Serbia) N Čačić (Serbia) D Lajović	7^{11}	3	[10]
