= 2025 Chengdu Open – Doubles =

Doubles
- 2025 Chengdu Open

Final
- Champions: (Germany) Constantin Frantzen (Netherlands) Robin Haase
- Runners-up: (United States) Vasil Kirkov (Netherlands) Bart Stevens
- Score: 4–6, 6–3, [10–7]

Details
- Draw: 28 (2WC)
- Seeds: 8

Events
Singles	Doubles
- Chengdu Open

Constantin Frantzen and Robin Haase defeated Vasil Kirkov and Bart Stevens in the final, 4–6, 6–3, [10–7] to win the doubles tennis title at the 2025 Chengdu Open. It was the first ATP Tour title for Frantzen and the tenth for Haase. They saved two match points en route to the title, in the first round against Rohan Bopanna and Takeru Yuzuki.

Sadio Doumbia and Fabien Reboul were the two-time defending champions, but lost in the first round to Kirkov and Stevens.

== Seeds ==
1. (United States) Christian Harrison / (United States) Evan King (first round)
2. (France) Sadio Doumbia / (France) Fabien Reboul (first round)
3. (Austria) Alexander Erler / (United States) Robert Galloway (first round)
4. (United Kingdom) Luke Johnson / (United States) Austin Krajicek (semifinals)

== Draw ==
Key

- Q = Qualifier
- WC = Wild card
- LL = Lucky loser
- Alt = Alternate
- ITF = ITF entry
- PR = Protected ranking
- SR = Special ranking
- SE = Special exempt
- JE = Junior exempt
- JR = Junior Accelerator Programme entrant
- CO = College Accelerator Programme entrant
- NG = Next Gen Accelerator Program entrant
- w/o = Walkover
- r = Retired
- d = Defaulted

=== Draw ===
First round
1	(United States) C Harrison (United States) E King	6^{7}	6^{4}
(United States) N Lammons (Netherlands) J-J Rojer	7^{9}	7^{7}
(India) R Bopanna (Japan) T Yuzuki	3	7^{7}	[10]
(Germany) C Frantzen (Netherlands) R Haase	6	6^{2}	[12]
3	(Austria) A Erler (United States) R Galloway	2	6	[7]
(Ecuador) D Hidalgo (United States) P Trhac	6	4	[10]
WC	(China) J Cui (China) R Te	4	7^{8}	[10]
(Brazil) R Matos (Brazil) M Melo	6	6^{6}	[7]
WC	(China) A Wang (China) Y Zhou	6^{5}	6	[13]
(Australia) MC Romios (United States) R Seggerman	7^{7}	3	[11]
Alt	(India) S Banthia (India) R Ramanathan	6^{9}	4
4	(United Kingdom) L Johnson (United States) A Krajicek	7^{11}	6
(Germany) J Schnaitter (Germany) M Wallner	6	6^{6}	[6]
Alt	(Australia) T Schoolkate (Australia) B Tomic	3	7^{8}	[10]
(United States) V Kirkov (Netherlands) B Stevens	7^{8}	4	[10]
2	(France) S Doumbia (France) F Reboul	6^{6}	6	[7]

Quarterfinals
(United States) N Lammons (Netherlands) J-J Rojer	6^{12}	6^{4}
(Germany) C Frantzen (Netherlands) R Haase	7^{14}	7^{7}
(Ecuador) D Hidalgo (United States) P Trhac	6	6
WC	(China) J Cui (China) R Te	2	3
WC	(China) A Wang (China) Y Zhou	2	6^{5}
4	(United Kingdom) L Johnson (United States) A Krajicek	6	7^{7}
Alt	(Australia) T Schoolkate (Australia) B Tomic	4	4
(United States) V Kirkov (Netherlands) B Stevens	6	6

Semifinals
(Germany) C Frantzen (Netherlands) R Haase	6	6
(Ecuador) D Hidalgo (United States) P Trhac	2	4
4	(United Kingdom) L Johnson (United States) A Krajicek	2	4
(United States) V Kirkov (Netherlands) B Stevens	6	6

Final
(Germany) C Frantzen (Netherlands) R Haase	4	6	[10]
(United States) V Kirkov (Netherlands) B Stevens	6	3	[7]
