= 2016 Astana Challenger Capital Cup – Singles =

Singles
- 2016 Astana Challenger Capital Cup

Final
- Champion: (Japan) Yoshihito Nishioka
- Runner-up: (Uzbekistan) Denis Istomin
- Score: 6–4, 6–7^{(4–7)}, 7–6^{(7–3)}

Events
| Singles | Doubles |
| Astana Challenger Capital Cup |

This was the first edition of the tournament.

Yoshihito Nishioka won the title after defeating Denis Istomin 6–4, 6–7^{(4–7)}, 7–6^{(7–3)} in the final.

== Seeds ==
1. (Japan) Yoshihito Nishioka (champion)
2. (Uzbekistan) Denis Istomin (final)
3. (Russia) Alexander Kudryavtsev (second round)
4. (Kazakhstan) Aleksandr Nedovyesov (semifinals, retired)
5. (Serbia) Nikola Milojević (quarterfinals, retired)
6. (Russia) Alexander Bublik (quarterfinals)
7. (Japan) Yuya Kibi (first round)
8. (Kazakhstan) Andrey Golubev (first round)

== Draw ==
=== Key ===
- Q = Qualifier
- WC = Wild card
- LL = Lucky loser
- Alt = Alternate
- SE = Special exempt
- PR = Protected ranking
- ITF = ITF entry
- JE = Junior exempt
- w/o = Walkover
- r = Retired
- d = Defaulted
- SR = Special ranking

=== Finals ===
Semifinals
1 | (Japan) Yoshihito Nishioka | 6 | 2
4 | (Kazakhstan) Aleksandr Nedovyesov | 4 | 1^{r}
Q | (Uzbekistan) Temur Ismailov | 2 | 7^{7} | 3
2 | (Uzbekistan) Denis Istomin | 6 | 6^{3} | 6

Final
1 | (Japan) Yoshihito Nishioka | 6 | 6^{4} | 7^{7}
2 | (Uzbekistan) Denis Istomin | 4 | 7^{7} | 6^{3}

=== Top half ===
First round
1 | (Japan) Y Nishioka | 6 | 6
(Chinese Taipei) T Chen | 3 | 1
(India) S Mukund | 4 | 4
(Uzbekistan) S Fayziev | 6 | 6
(Russia) Alexandr Igoshin | 4 | 2
(Croatia) A Pavić | 6 | 6
(Kazakhstan) D Popko | 6 | 6
7 | (Japan) Yuya Kibi | 3 | 2
4 | (Kazakhstan) A Nedovyesov | 7^{7} | 6
(Turkey) M İlhan | 6^{5} | 1
(Germany) Jeremy Jahn | 1 | 2
(Russia) A Vatutin | 6 | 6
WC | (Kazakhstan) D Yevseyev | 4 | 3
(South Korea) S-w Kwon | 6 | 6
(India) P Gunneswaran | 6 | 6
8 | (Kazakhstan) A Golubev | 4 | 2

Second round
1 | (Japan) Y Nishioka | 6 | 7^{10}
(Uzbekistan) S Fayziev | 2 | 6^{8}
(Croatia) A Pavić | 6^{4} | 6 | 3
(Kazakhstan) D Popko | 7^{7} | 3 | 6
4 | (Kazakhstan) A Nedovyesov | 6 | 6
(Russia) A Vatutin | 4 | 3
(South Korea) S-w Kwon | 3 | 6 | 1
(India) P Gunneswaran | 6 | 4 | 6

Quarterfinals
1 | (Japan) Y Nishioka | 6 | 6
(Kazakhstan) D Popko | 2 | 4
4 | (Kazakhstan) A Nedovyesov | 6 | 6
(India) P Gunneswaran | 2 | 3

Semifinals
1 | (Japan) Y Nishioka | 6 | 2
4 | (Kazakhstan) A Nedovyesov | 4 | 1^{r}

=== Bottom half ===
First round
6 | (Russia) A Bublik | 6 | 6
Q | (Belarus) S Betov | 4 | 4
WC | (Uzbekistan) J Karimov | 1 | 3
(Germany) D Masur | 6 | 6
WC | (Kazakhstan) T Khabibulin | 2 | 3
Q | (Uzbekistan) T Ismailov | 6 | 6
Q | (Ukraine) D Molchanov | 4 | 2
3 | (Russia) A Kudryavtsev | 6 | 6
5 | (Serbia) N Milojević | 7^{7} | 6
(Estonia) V Ivanov | 6^{2} | 1
WC | (Kazakhstan) Sagadat Ayap | 3 | 3
Q | (South Korea) Y-s Chung | 6 | 6
(Turkey) C İlkel | 6 | 6^{5} | 7
(Russia) E Karlovskiy | 0 | 7^{7} | 5
(Czech Republic) Robin Staněk | 0 | 7^{7} | 4
2 | (Uzbekistan) D Istomin | 6 | 6^{3} | 6

Second round
6 | (Russia) A Bublik | 3 | 7^{7} | 6
(Germany) D Masur | 6 | 6^{3} | 2
Q | (Uzbekistan) T Ismailov | 6 | 4 | 6
3 | (Russia) A Kudryavtsev | 1 | 6 | 4
5 | (Serbia) N Milojević | 6^{11} | 7^{9} | 6
Q | (South Korea) Y-s Chung | 7^{13} | 6^{7} | 3
(Turkey) C İlkel | 4 | 2
2 | (Uzbekistan) D Istomin | 6 | 6

Quarterfinals
6 | (Russia) A Bublik | 6^{5} | 4
Q | (Uzbekistan) T Ismailov | 7^{7} | 6
5 | (Serbia) N Milojević | 2 | 0^{r}
2 | (Uzbekistan) D Istomin | 6 | 0

Semifinals
Q | (Uzbekistan) T Ismailov | 2 | 7^{7} | 3
2 | (Uzbekistan) D Istomin | 6 | 6^{3} | 6
