= 2016 Astana Challenger Capital Cup =

- Date: 21–26 November
- Edition: 1st
- Draw: 32S / 16D
- Prize money: $50,000+H
- Surface: Hard / Indoors
- Location: Astana, Kazakhstan

Champions

Singles
- (Japan) Yoshihito Nishioka

Doubles
- (Kazakhstan) Timur Khabibulin / (Kazakhstan) Aleksandr Nedovyesov
Astana Challenger Capital Cup

The 2016 Astana Challenger Capital Cup was a professional tennis tournament played on indoor hardcourts. It was the first edition of the tournament which was part of the 2016 ATP Challenger Tour. It took place in Astana, Kazakhstan between 21 and 26 November 2016.

== Singles main draw entrants ==
=== Seeds ===
Country	Player	Rank^{1}	Seed
JPN	Yoshihito Nishioka	101	1
UZB	Denis Istomin	143	2
RUS	Alexander Kudryavtsev	172	3
KAZ	Aleksandr Nedovyesov	188	4
SRB	Nikola Milojević	201	5
RUS	Alexander Bublik	215	6
JPN	Yuya Kibi	227	7
KAZ	Andrey Golubev	230	8

- ^{1} Rankings are as of November 14, 2016.

=== Other entrants ===
The following players received entry into the singles main draw as wildcards:

- (Kazakhstan) Denis Yevseyev
- (Uzbekistan) Jurabek Karimov
- (Kazakhstan) Timur Khabibulin
- (Kazakhstan) Sagadat Ayap

The following players received entry from the qualifying draw:

- (Belarus) Sergey Betov
- (South Korea) Chung Yun-seong
- (Uzbekistan) Temur Ismailov
- (Ukraine) Denys Molchanov

== Champions ==
=== Singles ===
- (Japan) Yoshihito Nishioka def. (Uzbekistan) Denis Istomin, 6–4, 6–7^{(4–7)}, 7–6^{(7–3)}.

=== Doubles ===
- (Kazakhstan) Timur Khabibulin / (Kazakhstan) Aleksandr Nedovyesov def. (Russia) Mikhail Elgin / (Uzbekistan) Denis Istomin, 7–6^{(9–7)}, 6–2
