= 2023 Chengdu Open – Doubles =

Doubles
- 2023 Chengdu Open

Final
- Champions: (France) Sadio Doumbia (France) Fabien Reboul
- Runners-up: (Portugal) Francisco Cabral (Brazil) Rafael Matos
- Score: 4–6, 7–5, [10–7]

Events
Singles	Doubles
← 2019 ·	Chengdu Open	· 2024 →

Sadio Doumbia and Fabien Reboul defeated Francisco Cabral and Rafael Matos in the final, 4–6, 7–5, [10–7] to win the doubles tennis title at the 2023 Chengdu Open. It was both players' first individual ATP Tour title in their second tour-level final together.

Nikola Čačić and Dušan Lajović were the reigning champions from 2019, when the tournament was last held, but they chose not to participate this year.

== Seeds ==
1. (France) Sadio Doumbia / (France) Fabien Reboul (champions)
2. (Portugal) Francisco Cabral / (Brazil) Rafael Matos (final)
3. (Brazil) Marcelo Demoliner / (Netherlands) Matwé Middelkoop (first round, retired)
4. (United Kingdom) Julian Cash / (United States) Robert Galloway (quarterfinals)

== Draw ==
=== Key ===
- Q = Qualifier
- WC = Wild card
- LL = Lucky loser
- Alt = Alternate
- SE = Special exempt
- PR = Protected ranking
- ITF = ITF entry
- JE = Junior exempt
- w/o = Walkover
- r = Retired
- d = Defaulted
- SR = Special ranking

=== Draw ===
First round
1	(France) S Doumbia (France) F Reboul	6	4	[12]
(Netherlands) R Haase (Netherlands) B Stevens	4	6	[10]
WC	(China) J Cui (China) A Wang	0	6	[7]
(Australia) J Peers; R Safiullin	6	4	[10]
3	(Brazil) M Demoliner (Netherlands) M Middelkoop	7	3^{r}
(United States) M Giron (New Zealand) R Statham	5	4
(Australia) M Purcell (Australia) J Thompson	6	6
(Uruguay) A Behar (Finland) P Niklas-Salminen	1	4
(Portugal) N Borges (France) A Rinderknech	6	7^{7}
(Colombia) N Barrientos (Sweden) A Göransson	4	6^{2}
WC	(China) W Li (China) M Yang	2	1
4	(United Kingdom) J Cash (United States) R Galloway	6	6
(Colombia) DE Galán (Peru) JP Varillas	4	0
(Kazakhstan) A Bublik (Serbia) M Kecmanović	6	6
(Australia) C O'Connell (Australia) A Vukic	0^{r}
2	(Portugal) F Cabral (Brazil) R Matos	4

Quarterfinals
1	(France) S Doumbia (France) F Reboul	6	7^{7}
(Australia) J Peers; R Safiullin	3	6^{1}
(United States) M Giron (New Zealand) R Statham	w/o
(Australia) M Purcell (Australia) J Thompson
(Portugal) N Borges (France) A Rinderknech	6	4	[10]
4	(United Kingdom) J Cash (United States) R Galloway	3	6	[6]
(Kazakhstan) A Bublik (Serbia) M Kecmanović	3	3
2	(Portugal) F Cabral (Brazil) R Matos	6	6

Semifinals
1	(France) S Doumbia (France) F Reboul	6	6
(United States) M Giron (New Zealand) R Statham	4	4
(Portugal) N Borges (France) A Rinderknech
2	(Portugal) F Cabral (Brazil) R Matos	w/o

Final
1	(France) S Doumbia (France) F Reboul	4	7	[10]
2	(Portugal) F Cabral (Brazil) R Matos	6	5	[7]
