= 2026 Chengdu Open – Singles =

Singles
- 2026 Chengdu Open

Final
- Champion: (Spain) Alejandro Davidovich Fokina
- Runner-up: (Poland) Hubert Hurkacz
- Score: 6–4, 7–6^{(9–7)}

Details
- Draw: 28 (4Q / 3WC)
- Seeds: 8

Events
Singles	Doubles
- Chengdu Open

Alejandro Davidovich Fokina defeated Hubert Hurkacz in the final, 6–4, 7–6^{(9–7)} to win the singles tennis title at the 2026 Chengdu Open. It was his second ATP Tour title.

Alejandro Tabilo was the defending champion, but lost in the second round to Adrian Mannarino.

== Seeds ==
The top four seeds received a bye into the second round.

1. (Monaco) Valentin Vacherot (second round)
2. (Spain) Alejandro Davidovich Fokina (champion)
3. (Chile) Alejandro Tabilo (second round)
4. (Netherlands) Botic van de Zandschulp (second round)
5. (Poland) Hubert Hurkacz (final)
6. (Portugal) Nuno Borges (withdrew)
7. (Canada) Denis Shapovalov (semifinals)
8. (Argentina) Sebastián Báez (first round)

== Draw ==
Key

- Q = Qualifier
- WC = Wild card
- LL = Lucky loser
- Alt = Alternate
- ITF = ITF entry
- PR = Protected ranking
- SR = Special ranking
- SE = Special exempt
- JE = Junior exempt
- JR = Junior Accelerator Programme entrant
- CO = College Accelerator Programme entrant
- NG = Next Gen Accelerator Program entrant
- w/o = Walkover
- r = Retired
- d = Defaulted

=== Finals ===
Semifinals
5	(Poland) Hubert Hurkacz	6^{8}	6	6
7	(Canada) Denis Shapovalov	7^{10}	3	3
Q	(Georgia (country)) Nikoloz Basilashvili	6	4	3
2	(Spain) Alejandro Davidovich Fokina	4	6	6

Final
5	(Poland) Hubert Hurkacz	4	6^{7}
2	(Spain) Alejandro Davidovich Fokina	6	7^{9}

=== Top half ===
First round
Q	(South Africa) L Harris	6	6
(United States) A Kovacevic	3	4
(United States) M Damm	6	6
Q	(Japan) S Mochizuki	1	4
(Kazakhstan) A Shevchenko	3	6^{10}
5	(Poland) H Hurkacz	6	7^{12}
WC	(China) J Shang	6^{9}	2
(France) A Mannarino	7^{11}	6
(Czech Republic) V Kopřiva	6	7
WC	(China) J Hu	4	5
(Netherlands) T Griekspoor	4	6^{3}
7	(Canada) D Shapovalov	6	7^{7}

Second round
1	(Monaco) V Vacherot	4	6^{5}
Q	(South Africa) L Harris	6	7^{7}
(United States) M Damm	6	3	4
5	(Poland) H Hurkacz	4	6	6
3	(Chile) A Tabilo	4	4
(France) A Mannarino	6	6
(Czech Republic) V Kopřiva	2	3
7	(Canada) D Shapovalov	6	6

Quarterfinals
Q	(South Africa) L Harris	6^{10}	4
5	(Poland) H Hurkacz	7^{12}	6
(France) A Mannarino	7^{8}	3	2
7	(Canada) D Shapovalov	6^{8}	6	6

Semifinals
5	(Poland) H Hurkacz	6^{8}	6	6
7	(Canada) D Shapovalov	7^{10}	3	3

=== Bottom half ===
First round
8	(Argentina) S Báez	5	5
(United States) J Brooksby	7	7
(Australia) J Duckworth	4	4
(Italy) L Sonego	6	6
(Serbia) M Kecmanović	6^{3}	4
Q	(Georgia (country)) N Basilashvili	7^{7}	6
LL	(Italy) F Cinà	6	6
(Argentina) C Ugo Carabelli	3	2
NG	(France) M Kouamé	4	0
Q	(France) A Müller	6	6
(Argentina) JM Cerúndolo	6	6
WC	(China) Y Zhou	4	3

Second round
(United States) J Brooksby	5	7	6
(Italy) L Sonego	7	5	2
Q	(Georgia (country)) N Basilashvili	6	7
4	(Netherlands) B van de Zandschulp	4	5
LL	(Italy) F Cinà	6^{3}	1
Q	(France) A Müller	7^{7}	6
(Argentina) JM Cerúndolo	4	4
2	(Spain) A Davidovich Fokina	6	6

Quarterfinals
(United States) J Brooksby	4	6^{4}
Q	(Georgia (country)) N Basilashvili	6	7^{7}
Q	(France) A Müller	1	5
2	(Spain) A Davidovich Fokina	6	7

Semifinals
Q	(Georgia (country)) N Basilashvili	6	4	3
2	(Spain) A Davidovich Fokina	4	6	6

== Qualifying ==
=== Seeds ===
1. (Japan) Shintaro Mochizuki (qualified)
2. (France) Alexandre Müller (qualified)
3. (South Africa) Lloyd Harris (qualified)
4. (Georgia (country)) Nikoloz Basilashvili (qualified)
5. (Italy) Federico Cinà (qualifying competition, lucky loser)
6. (Canada) Alexis Galarneau (qualifying competition)
7. (United States) Andre Ilagan (first round)
8. Pavel Kotov (qualifying competition)

=== Qualifiers ===
1. (Japan) Shintaro Mochizuki
2. (France) Alexandre Müller
3. (South Africa) Lloyd Harris
4. (Georgia (country)) Nikoloz Basilashvili

=== Lucky loser ===
1. (Italy) Federico Cinà

=== Qualifying draw ===
==== First qualifier ====
First round
1	(Japan) Shintaro Mochizuki	7	4	7
WC	(China) Xiao Linang	5	6	5
(Switzerland) Luca Castelnuovo	7^{7}	5	5
8	Pavel Kotov	6^{4}	7	7

Qualifying competition
1	(Japan) Shintaro Mochizuki	7	6
8	Pavel Kotov	5	3

==== Second qualifier ====
First round
2	(France) Alexandre Müller	6	6^{6}	6
(France) Luka Pavlovic	4	7^{8}	3
Petr Bar Biryukov	7^{7}	7^{7}
7	(United States) Andre Ilagan	6^{4}	6^{5}

Qualifying competition
2	(France) Alexandre Müller	6	6
Petr Bar Biryukov	4	4

==== Third qualifier ====
First round
3	(South Africa) Lloyd Harris	6	7
(Japan) Kenta Miyoshi	3	5
(Sweden) Elias Ymer	5	6^{5}
6	(Canada) Alexis Galarneau	7	7^{7}

Qualifying competition
3	(South Africa) Lloyd Harris	6	7
6	(Canada) Alexis Galarneau	3	5

==== Fourth qualifier ====
First round
4	(Georgia (country)) Nikoloz Basilashvili	6	6
WC	(China) Lu Hanlei	2	0
(Japan) Kaichi Uchida	1	2
5	(Italy) Federico Cinà	6	6

Qualifying competition
4	(Georgia (country)) Nikoloz Basilashvili	6	6
5	(Italy) Federico Cinà	3	2
