= 2023 Chengdu Open – Singles =

Singles
- 2023 Chengdu Open

Final
- Champion: (Germany) Alexander Zverev
- Runner-up: Roman Safiullin
- Score: 6–7^{(2–7)}, 7–6^{(7–5)}, 6–3

Details
- Draw: 28 (4 Q / 3 WC )
- Seeds: 8

Events
Singles	Doubles
← 2019 ·	Chengdu Open	· 2024 →

Alexander Zverev defeated Roman Safiullin in the final, 6–7^{(2–7)}, 7–6^{(7–5)}, 6–3 to win the singles tennis title at the 2023 Chengdu Open. Zverev's victory earned him his 21st career ATP Tour singles title, while Safiullin competed in his maiden tour-level final.

Pablo Carreño Busta was the reigning champion from 2019, when the tournament was last held, but did not participate this year.

== Seeds ==
The top four seeds received a bye into the second round.

1. (Germany) Alexander Zverev (champion)
2. (Italy) Lorenzo Musetti (semifinals)
3. (Bulgaria) Grigor Dimitrov (semifinals)
4. (United Kingdom) Dan Evans (second round)
5. (Kazakhstan) Alexander Bublik (first round)
6. (Australia) Max Purcell (first round)
7. (Serbia) Miomir Kecmanović (quarterfinals)
8. (Australia) Aleksandar Vukic (first round)

== Draw ==
=== Key ===
- Q = Qualifier
- WC = Wild card
- LL = Lucky loser
- Alt = Alternate
- SE = Special exempt
- PR = Protected ranking
- ITF = ITF entry
- JE = Junior exempt
- w/o = Walkover
- r = Retired
- d = Defaulted
- SR = Special ranking

=== Finals ===
Semifinals
1	(Germany) Alexander Zverev	6	7^{7}
3	(Bulgaria) Grigor Dimitrov	3	6^{2}
Roman Safiullin	6	6
2	(Italy) Lorenzo Musetti	3	4

Final
1	(Germany) Alexander Zverev	6^{2}	7^{7}	6
Roman Safiullin	7^{7}	6^{5}	3

=== Top half ===
First round
(Colombia) DE Galán	5	5
Q	P Kotov	7	7
WC	(China) T Mu	2	2
(France) C Moutet	6	6
Q	(Zimbabwe) B Lock	2	3
7	(Serbia) M Kecmanović	6	6
WC	(China) J Cui	1	3
(Peru) JP Varillas	6	6
(Australia) C O'Connell	7^{7}	6
Q	A Kachmazov	6^{3}	4
(Japan) T Daniel	4	6	6
8	(Australia) A Vukic	6	4	2

Second round
1	(Germany) A Zverev	7^{7}	4	6
Q	P Kotov	6^{5}	6	1
(France) C Moutet	2	3
7	(Serbia) M Kecmanović	6	6
3	(Bulgaria) G Dimitrov	6	6
(Peru) JP Varillas	3	4
(Australia) C O'Connell	7^{12}	6
(Japan) T Daniel	6^{10}	4

Quarterfinals
1	(Germany) A Zverev	5	7	6
7	(Serbia) M Kecmanović	7	5	2
3	(Bulgaria) G Dimitrov	6	6
(Australia) C O'Connell	4	1

Semifinals
1	(Germany) A Zverev	6	7^{7}
3	(Bulgaria) G Dimitrov	3	6^{2}

=== Bottom half ===
First round
6	(Australia) M Purcell	2	6^{8}
(Australia) J Thompson	6	7^{10}
WC	(Belgium) Z Bergs	4	6	3
(Serbia) D Lajović	6	1	6
R Safiullin	6	6
(United States) B Nakashima	4	4
5	(Kazakhstan) A Bublik	6^{6}	3
(United States) M Giron	7^{8}	6
(France) A Rinderknech	7^{7}	7^{8}
LL	(Australia) L Tu	6^{5}	6^{6}
Q	(Australia) P Sekulic	7	5	6
(Portugal) N Borges	5	7	3

Second round
(Australia) J Thompson	6	7^{7}
(Serbia) D Lajović	1	6^{1}
R Safiullin	6	6
4	(United Kingdom) D Evans	3	3
(United States) M Giron	6^{2}	4
(France) A Rinderknech	7^{7}	6
Q	(Australia) P Sekulic	6^{3}	7^{7}	0
2	(Italy) L Musetti	7^{7}	6^{4}	6

Quarterfinals
(Australia) J Thompson	6^{1}	0^{r}
R Safiullin	7^{7}	0
(France) A Rinderknech	3	3
2	(Italy) L Musetti	6	6

Semifinals
R Safiullin	6	6
2	(Italy) L Musetti	3	4

== Qualifying ==
=== Seeds ===
1. Pavel Kotov (qualified)
2. (Australia) Li Tu (qualifying competition, lucky loser)
3. Evgeny Donskoy (qualifying competition)
4. (Japan) Rio Noguchi (qualifying competition)
5. (Australia) Omar Jasika (qualifying competition)
6. Alibek Kachmazov (qualified)
7. (Australia) Philip Sekulic (qualified)
8. (Zimbabwe) Benjamin Lock (qualified)

=== Qualifiers ===
1. Pavel Kotov
2. Alibek Kachmazov
3. (Australia) Philip Sekulic
4. (Zimbabwe) Benjamin Lock

=== Lucky loser ===
1. (Australia) Li Tu

=== Qualifying draw ===
==== First qualifier ====
First round
1	Pavel Kotov	6	6
(New Zealand) Rubin Statham	3	4
Mikalai Haliak	7	3	2
5	(Australia) Omar Jasika	5	6	6

Qualifying competition
1	Pavel Kotov	6	6
5	(Australia) Omar Jasika	2	2

==== Second qualifier ====
First round
2	(Australia) Li Tu	6	6
WC	(China) Li Wenfu	1	1
PR	Alexey Zakharov	6^{2}	7^{7}	3
6	Alibek Kachmazov	7^{7}	6^{5}	6

Qualifying competition
2	(Australia) Li Tu	4	2
6	Alibek Kachmazov	6	6

==== Third qualifier ====
First round
3	Evgeny Donskoy	7^{7}	4	7^{7}
PR	Egor Gerasimov	6^{3}	6	6^{4}
(United States) Nick Chappell	3	6^{4}
7	(Australia) Philip Sekulic	6	7^{7}

Qualifying competition
3	Evgeny Donskoy	2	6	2
7	(Australia) Philip Sekulic	6	4	6

==== Fourth qualifier ====
First round
4	(Japan) Rio Noguchi	7	6
(Japan) Hiroki Moriya	5	3
WC	(China) Xiao Linang	4	6	3
8	(Zimbabwe) Benjamin Lock	6	4	6

Qualifying competition
4	(Japan) Rio Noguchi	3	6^{5}
8	(Zimbabwe) Benjamin Lock	6	7^{7}
