= 2018 Chengdu Open =

- Date: September 24–30
- Edition: 3rd
- Category: ATP World Tour 250 series
- Draw: 28S/16D
- Surface: Hard / Outdoor
- Location: Chengdu, China

Champions

Singles
- (Australia) Bernard Tomic

Doubles
- (Croatia) Ivan Dodig / (Croatia) Mate Pavić
← 2017 ·	Chengdu Open	· 2019 →

The 2018 Chengdu Open was a men's tennis tournament played on outdoor hard courts. It was the 3rd edition of the Chengdu Open and part of the ATP World Tour 250 series of the 2018 ATP World Tour. It took place at the Sichuan International Tennis Center in Chengdu, China, from September 24 to 30.

== Singles main-draw entrants ==
=== Seeds ===
Country	Player	Rank^{1}	Seed
ITA	Fabio Fognini	13	1
KOR	Chung Hyeon	23	2
GEO	Nikoloz Basilashvili	31	3
FRA	Adrian Mannarino	32	4
FRA	Gaël Monfils	42	5
AUS	Matthew Ebden	48	6
POR	João Sousa	49	7
USA	Tennys Sandgren	58	8

- ^{1} Rankings are as of September 17, 2018

=== Other entrants ===
The following players received wildcards into the singles main draw:

- (Chinese Taipei) Tseng Chun-hsin
- (China) Wu Yibing
- (China) ~~Zhang Ze~~

The following players received entry from the qualifying draw:

- (Belgium) Ruben Bemelmans
- (India) Prajnesh Gunneswaran
- (South Africa) Lloyd Harris
- (Australia) Bernard Tomic

The following player received entry as a lucky loser:

- (Canada) Félix Auger-Aliassime

=== Withdrawals ===
Before the tournament

- (South Africa) Kevin Anderson →replaced by (United States) Tim Smyczek
- (Spain) Pablo Carreño Busta →replaced by (Canada) Vasek Pospisil
- (Hungary) Márton Fucsovics →replaced by (Moldova) Radu Albot
- (Chile) Nicolás Jarry →replaced by (Russia) Evgeny Donskoy
- (Argentina) Leonardo Mayer →replaced by (Argentina) Guido Pella
- (Australia) John Millman →replaced by (Cyprus) Marcos Baghdatis
- (United States) Frances Tiafoe →replaced by (United States) Taylor Fritz
- (China) Zhang Ze →replaced by (Canada) Félix Auger-Aliassime

=== Retirements ===
- (Germany) Mischa Zverev

== Doubles main-draw entrants ==
=== Seeds ===
Country	Player	Country	Player	Rank^{1}	Seed
CRO	Ivan Dodig	CRO	Mate Pavić	28	1
CHI	Julio Peralta	ARG	Horacio Zeballos	64	2
IND	Divij Sharan	NZL	Artem Sitak	73	3
MEX	Santiago González	PAK	Aisam-ul-Haq Qureshi	86	4

- ^{1} Rankings are as of September 1, 2018

=== Other entrants ===
The following pairs received wildcards into the doubles main draw:

- (China) Gao Xin / (China) Te Rigele
- (China) Gong Maoxin / (China) Zhang Ze

The following pairs received entry as alternates:

- (Belgium) Ruben Bemelmans / (India) Prajnesh Gunneswaran

=== Withdrawals ===
Before the tournament

- (Italy) Fabio Fognini (fatigue)

== Champions ==
=== Singles ===
- (Australia) Bernard Tomic def. (Italy) Fabio Fognini, 6–1, 3–6, 7–6^{(9-7)}

=== Doubles ===
- (Croatia) Ivan Dodig / (Croatia) Mate Pavić def. (United States) Austin Krajicek / (India) Jeevan Nedunchezhiyan, 6–2, 6–4
