= 2017 Chengdu Open =

- Date: September 25 – October 1
- Edition: 2nd
- Category: ATP World Tour 250 series
- Draw: 28S/16D
- Surface: Hard / Outdoor
- Location: Chengdu, China

Champions

Singles
- (Uzbekistan) Denis Istomin

Doubles
- (Israel) Jonathan Erlich / (Pakistan) Aisam-ul-Haq Qureshi
← 2016 ·	Chengdu Open	· 2018 →

The 2017 Chengdu Open was a men's tennis tournament played on outdoor hard courts. It was the 2nd edition of the Chengdu Open and part of the ATP World Tour 250 series of the 2017 ATP World Tour. It took place at the Sichuan International Tennis Center in Chengdu, China, from September 25 to October 1.

== Singles main-draw entrants ==
=== Seeds ===
Country	Player	Rank^{1}	Seed
AUT	Dominic Thiem	7	1
ESP	Albert Ramos Viñolas	25	2
RUS	Karen Khachanov	32	3
RUS	Andrey Rublev	37	4
JPN	Yūichi Sugita	42	5
GBR	Kyle Edmund	45	6
SRB	Viktor Troicki	47	7
ARG	Leonardo Mayer	53	8

- ^{1} Rankings are as of September 18, 2017

=== Other entrants ===
The following players received wildcards into the singles main draw:

- (China) Wu Di
- (China) Wu Yibing
- (Sweden) Mikael Ymer

The following player received entry as a special exempt:

- (Germany) Peter Gojowczyk

The following players received entry from the qualifying draw:

- (United States) Taylor Fritz
- (Spain) Adrián Menéndez Maceiras
- (Croatia) Mate Pavić
- (Greece) Stefanos Tsitsipas

=== Withdrawals ===
Before the tournament

- (France) Adrian Mannarino →replaced by (Serbia) Dušan Lajović
- (France) Jo-Wilfried Tsonga →replaced by (Brazil) Thiago Monteiro
- (Spain) Fernando Verdasco →replaced by (Australia) Bernard Tomic

=== Retirements ===
- (Croatia) Mate Pavić

== Doubles main-draw entrants ==
=== Seeds ===
Country	Player	Country	Player	Rank^{1}	Seed
AUT	Oliver Marach	CRO	Mate Pavić	39	1
CHI	Julio Peralta	NZL	Michael Venus	49	2
MEX	Santiago González	SRB	Nenad Zimonjić	77	3
GBR	Dominic Inglot	CAN	Daniel Nestor	93	4

- ^{1} Rankings are as of September 18, 2017

=== Other entrants ===
The following pairs received wildcards into the doubles main draw:

- (China) Sun Fajing / (China) Te Rigele
- (China) Wu Di / (China) Wu Yibing

== Champions ==
=== Singles ===
- (Uzbekistan) Denis Istomin def. (Cyprus) Marcos Baghdatis, 3–2 ret.

=== Doubles ===
- (Israel) Jonathan Erlich / (Pakistan) Aisam-ul-Haq Qureshi def. (New Zealand) Marcus Daniell / (Brazil) Marcelo Demoliner, 6–3, 7–6^{(7–3)}
