= 2016 Chengdu Open – Doubles =

Doubles
- 2016 Chengdu Open

Final
- Champions: (United States) Rajeev Ram (South Africa) Raven Klaasen
- Runners-up: (Spain) Pablo Carreño Busta (Poland) Mariusz Fyrstenberg
- Score: 7−6^{(7-2)}, 7−5

Events
Singles	Doubles
- Chengdu Open

This was the first edition of the tournament. Raven Klaasen and Rajeev Ram won the title, defeating Pablo Carreño Busta and Mariusz Fyrstenberg in the final, 7−6^{(7–2)}, 7−5.

== Seeds ==
1. (South Africa) Raven Klaasen / (United States) Rajeev Ram (champions)
2. (Colombia) Juan Sebastián Cabal / (Colombia) Robert Farah (first round)
3. (United Kingdom) Dominic Inglot / (Serbia) Nenad Zimonjić (first round)
4. (Spain) Pablo Carreño Busta / (Poland) Mariusz Fyrstenberg (final)

== Draw ==
Key

- Q = Qualifier
- WC = Wild card
- LL = Lucky loser
- Alt = Alternate
- ITF = ITF entry
- PR = Protected ranking
- SR = Special ranking
- SE = Special exempt
- JE = Junior exempt
- JR = Junior Accelerator Programme entrant
- CO = College Accelerator Programme entrant
- NG = Next Gen Accelerator Program entrant
- w/o = Walkover
- r = Retired
- d = Defaulted

=== Draw ===
First round
1	(South Africa) R Klaasen (United States) R Ram	6	7
WC	(China) Y He (China) F Sun	4	5
(United States) J Cerretani (Austria) P Oswald	3	2
(Australia) N Kyrgios (Serbia) V Troicki	6	6
3	(United Kingdom) D Inglot (Serbia) N Zimonjić	2	4
(India) P Raja (India) D Sharan	6	6
(United States) N Monroe (New Zealand) A Sitak	6	1	[10]
(Argentina) F Delbonis (Italy) P Lorenzi	3	6	[4]
Alt	(Spain) A Ramos-Viñolas (Norway) C Ruud	4	2
(Serbia) D Lajović (Portugal) J Sousa	6	6
WC	(China) Y Bai (China) D Wu	2	7^{7}	[6]
4	(Spain) P Carreño Busta (Poland) M Fyrstenberg	6	6^{2}	[10]
(India) R Bopanna (India) J Nedunchezhiyan	6	6
(Spain) F López (Argentina) J Mónaco	2	4
(Canada) A Shamasdin (Sweden) A Siljeström	6	1	[11]
2	(Colombia) JS Cabal (Colombia) R Farah	4	6	[9]

Quarterfinals
1	(South Africa) R Klaasen (United States) R Ram	6	6
(Australia) N Kyrgios (Serbia) V Troicki	1	4
(India) P Raja (India) D Sharan	4	3
(United States) N Monroe (New Zealand) A Sitak	6	6
(Serbia) D Lajović (Portugal) J Sousa	3	4
4	(Spain) P Carreño Busta (Poland) M Fyrstenberg	6	6
(India) R Bopanna (India) J Nedunchezhiyan	4	6^{4}
(Canada) A Shamasdin (Sweden) A Siljeström	6	7^{7}

Semifinals
1	(South Africa) R Klaasen (United States) R Ram	6	7^{7}
(United States) N Monroe (New Zealand) A Sitak	4	6^{5}
4	(Spain) P Carreño Busta (Poland) M Fyrstenberg	7^{7}	6
(Canada) A Shamasdin (Sweden) A Siljeström	6^{4}	3

Final
1	(South Africa) R Klaasen (United States) R Ram	7^{7}	7
4	(Spain) P Carreño Busta (Poland) M Fyrstenberg	6^{2}	5
