= 2016 Chengdu Open =

- Date: September 26 – October 2
- Edition: 1st
- Category: World Tour 250
- Draw: 28S / 16D
- Prize money: $840,915
- Surface: Hard / outdoor
- Location: Chengdu, China

Champions

Singles
- (Russia) Karen Khachanov

Doubles
- (South Africa) Raven Klaasen / (United States) Rajeev Ram
Chengdu Open	· 2017 →

The 2016 Chengdu Open was a men's tennis tournament played on outdoor hard courts. It was the inaugural edition of the Chengdu Open and part of the ATP World Tour 250 series of the 2016 ATP World Tour. It took place at the Sichuan International Tennis Center in Chengdu, China, from September 26 to October 2, 2016. Unseeded Karen Khachanov won the singles title.

== Finals ==
=== Singles ===
- (Russia) Karen Khachanov defeated (Spain) Albert Ramos Viñolas, 6–7^{(4–7)}, 7–6^{(7–3)}, 6–3

=== Doubles ===
- (South Africa) Raven Klaasen / (United States) Rajeev Ram defeated (Spain) Pablo Carreño Busta / (Poland) Mariusz Fyrstenberg, 7–6^{(7–2)}, 7–5

== Singles main-draw entrants ==
=== Seeds ===
Country	Player	Rank^{1}	Seed
AUT	Dominic Thiem	10	1
AUS	Nick Kyrgios	15	2
BUL	Grigor Dimitrov	21	3
ESP	Feliciano López	26	4
ESP	Albert Ramos Viñolas	32	5
SRB	Viktor Troicki	33	6
POR	João Sousa	34	7
ITA	Paolo Lorenzi	35	8

- ^{1} Rankings are as of September 19, 2016

=== Other entrants ===
The following players received wildcards into the singles main draw:

- (Norway) Casper Ruud
- (Austria) Dominic Thiem
- (China) Wu Di

The following player received entry using a protected ranking:

- (Argentina) Juan Mónaco

The following players received entry from the qualifying draw:

- (Germany) Michael Berrer
- (United States) Denis Kudla
- (Japan) Hiroki Moriya
- (Czech Republic) Radek Štěpánek

=== Withdrawals ===
Before the tournament

- (Spain) Nicolás Almagro →replaced by (Chinese Taipei) Lu Yen-hsun
- (France) Jérémy Chardy →replaced by (Argentina) Diego Schwartzman
- (Croatia) Borna Ćorić →replaced by (Australia) Jordan Thompson
- (Argentina) Guido Pella →replaced by (Australia) John Millman
- (France) Jo-Wilfried Tsonga →replaced by (Russia) Konstantin Kravchuk

== Doubles main-draw entrants ==
=== Seeds ===
Country	Player	Country	Player	Rank^{1}	Seed
RSA	Raven Klaasen	USA	Rajeev Ram	31	1
COL	Juan Sebastián Cabal	COL	Robert Farah	54	2
GBR	Dominic Inglot	SRB	Nenad Zimonjić	88	3
ESP	Pablo Carreño Busta	POL	Mariusz Fyrstenberg	105	4

- ^{1} Rankings are as of September 19, 2016

=== Other entrants ===
The following pairs received wildcards into the doubles main draw:

- (China) He Yecong / (China) Sun Fajing
- (China) Wu Di / (China) Bai Yan

The following pair received entry as alternates:

- (Spain) Albert Ramos Viñolas / (Norway) Casper Ruud

=== Withdrawals ===
Before the tournament

- (Czech Republic) Radek Štěpánek (illness)
