= 2023 Chengdu Open =

- Date: 20–26 September
- Edition: 5th
- Category: ATP Tour 250 series
- Draw: 28S / 16D
- Surface: Hard / outdoor
- Location: Chengdu, China

Champions

Singles
- (Germany) Alexander Zverev

Doubles
- (France) Sadio Doumbia / (France) Fabien Reboul
- Chengdu Open

The 2023 Chengdu Open was a men's tennis tournament played on outdoor hard courts. It was the 5th edition of the Chengdu Open (the first since 2019 after intervening editions were cancelled due to the COVID-19 pandemic in mainland China) and part of the ATP Tour 250 series of the 2023 ATP Tour. It took place at the Sichuan International Tennis Center in Chengdu, China, from 20 to 26 September 2023.

== Champions ==
=== Singles ===
- (Germany) Alexander Zverev def. Roman Safiullin, 6–7^{(2–7)}, 7–6^{(7–5)}, 6–3

=== Doubles ===
- (France) Sadio Doumbia / (France) Fabien Reboul def. (Portugal) Francisco Cabral / (Brazil) Rafael Matos, 4–6, 7–5, [10–7]

== Singles main-draw entrants ==
=== Seeds ===
Country	Player	Rank^{1}	Seed
GER	Alexander Zverev	10	1
ITA	Lorenzo Musetti	18	2
BUL	Grigor Dimitrov	20	3
GBR	Dan Evans	27	4
KAZ	Alexander Bublik	29	5
AUS	Max Purcell	43	6
SRB	Miomir Kecmanović	48	7
AUS	Aleksandar Vukic	50	8

- ^{1} Rankings are as of 18 September 2023

=== Other entrants ===
The following players received wildcards into the singles main draw:

- (Belgium) Zizou Bergs
- (China) Cui Jie
- (China) Mu Tao

The following players received entry from the qualifying draw:

- Alibek Kachmazov
- Pavel Kotov
- (Zimbabwe) Benjamin Lock
- (Australia) Philip Sekulic

The following player received entry as a lucky loser:

- (Australia) Li Tu

=== Withdrawals ===
- (Spain) Roberto Bautista Agut → replaced by (Japan) Taro Daniel
- (Finland) Emil Ruusuvuori → replaced by (Australia) Li Tu

== Doubles main-draw entrants ==
=== Seeds ===
Country	Player	Country	Player	Rank^{1}	Seed
FRA	Sadio Doumbia	FRA	Fabien Reboul	95	1
POR	Francisco Cabral	BRA	Rafael Matos	98	2
BRA	Marcelo Demoliner	NED	Matwé Middelkoop	104	3
GBR	Julian Cash	USA	Robert Galloway	106	4

- ^{1} Rankings are as of 18 September 2023

=== Other entrants ===
The following pairs received wildcards into the doubles main draw:

- (China) Cui Jie / (China) Wang Aoran
- (China) Li Wenfu / (China) Yang Mingyuan

=== Withdrawals ===
- (Uruguay) Ariel Behar / (Czech Republic) Adam Pavlásek → replaced by (Uruguay) Ariel Behar / (Finland) Patrik Niklas-Salminen
- (Ecuador) Gonzalo Escobar / (Kazakhstan) Aleksandr Nedovyesov → replaced by (United States) Marcos Giron / (New Zealand) Rubin Statham
- (South Africa) Lloyd Harris / (Australia) John Peers → replaced by (Australia) John Peers / Roman Safiullin
