= Astana Challenger Capital Cup =

Tennis tournament held in Kazakhstan

Defunct tennis tournament
- Event name: Astana Challenger Capital Cup
- Location: Astana, Kazakhstan
- Venue: Daulet National Tennis Centre
- Category: ATP Challenger Tour
- Surface: Hard (indoor)
- Draw: 32S/32Q/16D
- Prize money: $50,000 + H

The Astana Challenger Capital Cup was a professional tennis tournament played on indoor hardcourts. It was part of the Association of Tennis Professionals (ATP) Challenger Tour. It was held in Astana, Kazakhstan, in 2016.

== Past finals ==
=== Singles ===
Year	Champion	Runner-up	Score
2016	(Japan) Yoshihito Nishioka	(Uzbekistan) Denis Istomin	6–4, 6–7^{(7–4)}, 7–6^{(7–3)}

=== Doubles ===
Year	Champions	Runners-up	Score
2016	(Kazakhstan) Timur Khabibulin (Kazakhstan) Aleksandr Nedovyesov	(Russia) Mikhail Elgin (Uzbekistan) Denis Istomin	7–6^{(9–7)}, 6–2
