= 2026 Chengdu Open =

- Date: 23–29 September
- Edition: 8th
- Category: ATP 250 tournaments
- Draw: 28S / 16D
- Surface: Hard / outdoor
- Location: Chengdu, China

Champions

Singles
- (Spain) Alejandro Davidovich Fokina

Doubles
- (United Kingdom) Luke Johnson / (Poland) Jan Zieliński
- Chengdu Open

The 2026 Chengdu Open was a men's tennis tournament played on outdoor hard courts. It was the eighth edition of the Chengdu Open and an ATP 250 tournament on the 2026 ATP Tour. It took place at the Sichuan International Tennis Center in Chengdu, China, from 23 to 29 September 2026.

== Champions ==
=== Singles ===
- (Spain) Alejandro Davidovich Fokina def. (Poland) Hubert Hurkacz, 6–4, 7–6^{(9–7)}

=== Doubles ===
- (United Kingdom) Luke Johnson / (Poland) Jan Zieliński def. (United States) Robert Galloway / (Sweden) André Göransson, 7–6^{(9–7)}, 7–5

== Singles main-draw entrants ==
=== Seeds ===
Country	Player	Rank^{1}	Seed
MON	Valentin Vacherot	19	1
ESP	Alejandro Davidovich Fokina	29	2
CHI	Alejandro Tabilo	32	3
NED	Botic van de Zandschulp	40	4
POL	Hubert Hurkacz	46	5
~~POR~~	~~Nuno Borges~~	~~48~~	~~6~~
CAN	Denis Shapovalov	50	7
ARG	Sebastián Báez	51	8

- ^{1} Rankings are as of 21 September 2026

=== Other entrants ===
The following players received wildcards into the singles main draw:

- (China) Hu Jia
- (China) Shang Juncheng
- (China) Zhou Yi

The following player received entry through the Next Gen Accelerator program:

- (France) Moïse Kouamé

The following players received entry from the qualifying draw:

- (Georgia (country)) Nikoloz Basilashvili
- (South Africa) Lloyd Harris
- (Japan) Shintaro Mochizuki
- (France) Alexandre Müller

=== Withdrawals ===
- (Argentina) Román Andrés Burruchaga → replaced by (United States) Aleksandar Kovacevic
- (Germany) Yannick Hanfmann → replaced by (United States) Martin Damm
- (Germany) Jan-Lennard Struff → replaced by (Australia) James Duckworth
- (Argentina) Thiago Agustín Tirante → replaced by (Italy) Lorenzo Sonego

== Doubles main-draw entrants ==
=== Seeds ===
Country	Player	Country	Player	Rank^{1}	Seed
FRA	Théo Arribagé	FRA	Albano Olivetti	39	1
FRA	Sadio Doumbia	FRA	Fabien Reboul	49	2
GER	Jakob Schnaitter	GER	Mark Wallner	64	3
USA	Robert Galloway	SWE	André Göransson	73	4

- ^{1} Rankings are as of 21 September 2026

=== Other entrants ===
The following pairs received wildcards into the doubles main draw:

- (China) Hu Jia / (China) Lu Hanlei
- (China) Wang Aoran / (China) Zhou Yi
