= Denis Istomin =

Uzbek professional tennis player (born 1986)

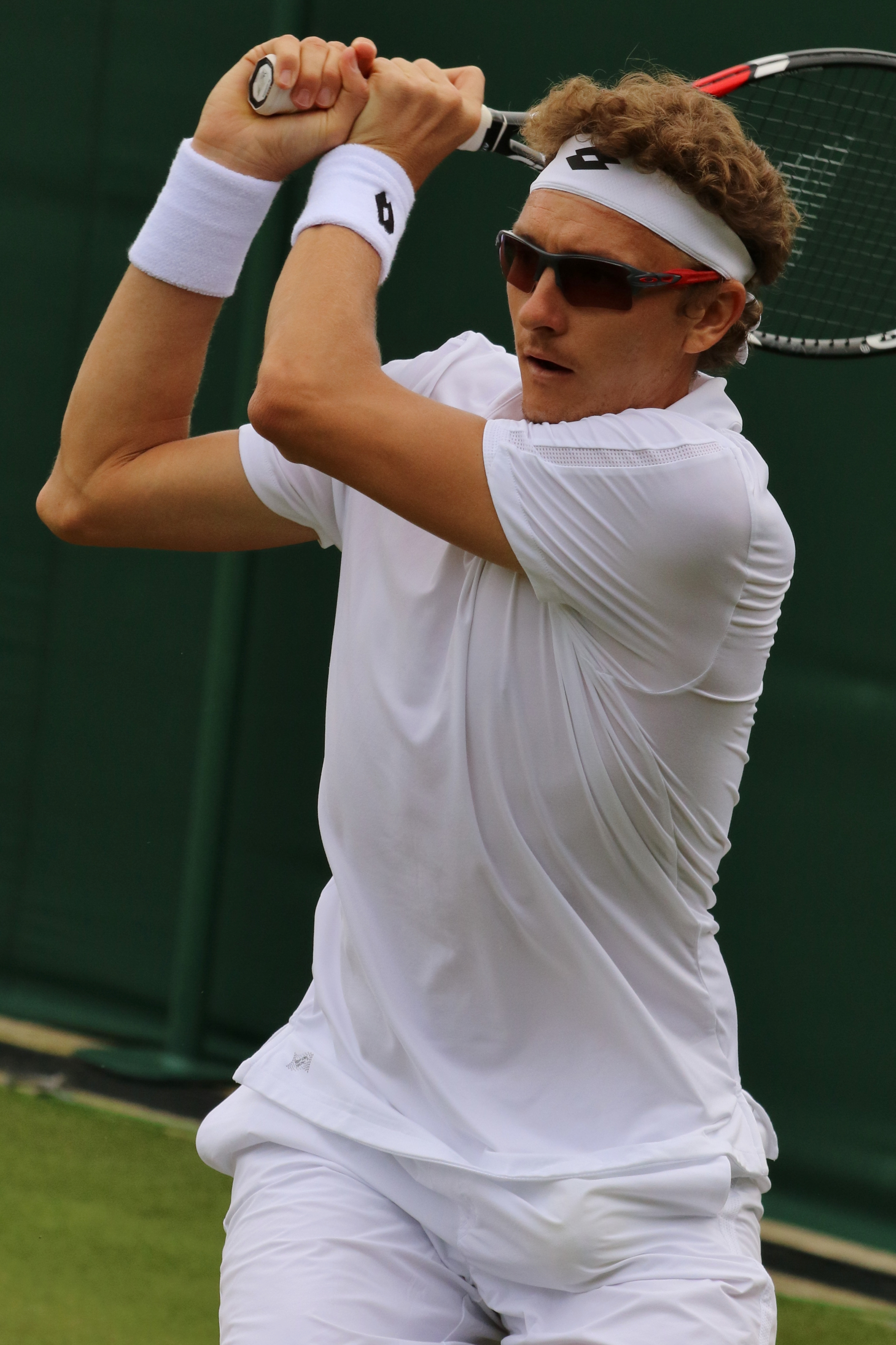
- Istomin at the 2016 Wimbledon Championships
- Country (sports): Uzbekistan
- Residence: Tashkent, Uzbekistan
- Born: 7 September 1986 (age 40) Orenburg, Russian SFSR, Soviet Union
- Height: 1.85 m (6 ft 1 in)
- Turned pro: 2004
- Plays: Right-handed (two-handed backhand)
- Coach: Klaudiya Istomina
- Prize money: US$ 6,338,578

Singles
- Career record: 230–267
- Career titles: 2
- Highest ranking: No. 33 (13 August 2012)

Grand Slam singles results
- Australian Open: 4R (2017)
- French Open: 2R (2009, 2010, 2012, 2013, 2014, 2017)
- Wimbledon: 4R (2012)
- US Open: 4R (2013)

Other tournaments
- Olympic Games: 3R (2012)

Doubles
- Career record: 94–132
- Career titles: 3
- Highest ranking: No. 59 (8 October 2012)
- Current ranking: No. 1,188 (8 June 2026)

Grand Slam doubles results
- Australian Open: 2R (2012, 2015)
- French Open: 3R (2011, 2012)
- Wimbledon: 3R (2012)
- US Open: 2R (2011, 2015)

Team competitions
- Davis Cup: 52–34 (Sin. 35–18, Dbs. 17–16)
Medal record
Men's tennis
Representing Uzbekistan
Asian Games
Gold medal – first place	2018 Jakarta-Palembang	Singles
Silver medal – second place	2010 Guangzhou	Singles
Silver medal – second place	2010 Guangzhou	Team
Bronze medal – third place	2014 Incheon	Team
- Last updated on: 8 June 2026.

Denis Olegovich Istomin (born 7 September 1986) is an Uzbek professional tennis player. He reached a career-high ATP singles ranking of world No. 33, achieved on 13 August 2012 and a best doubles ranking of No. 59, reached on 8 October 2012. His most notable result is defeating second seed and defending champion Novak Djokovic at the 2017 Australian Open.

Istomin won two ATP Tour singles titles, at the 2015 Nottingham Open and 2017 Chengdu Open.

== Personal life ==
Denis Istomin was born in Orenburg to Russian parents Oleg Istomin and Klaudiya Istomina. His father moved the family to Tashkent, Uzbekistan, when Denis was 3 months old. Denis is coached by his mother, who introduced him to the sport at an early age. Injuries resulting from a car crash in 2001 en route to an event kept Istomin away from tennis for 2 years, with doctors initially stating that he would never hold a racquet again. Despite this, Istomin resumed training in April 2003.

He is good friends with Varvara Lepchenko, who previously played for Uzbekistan.

=== On court ===
Istomin is one of the few top ATP Professional players, along with Janko Tipsarević and Chung Hyeon, to wear glasses while playing (most players either have near perfect eyesight or wear contact lenses).

== Career ==
=== 2004–05: Turning Pro, Top 200 debut ===
Istomin broke into the top–200 late in 2005 and finished the year at No. 196. He won his first Challenger tournament in Bukhara.

=== 2006 ===
Istomin received the Asian wildcard into the 2006 Australian Open, where he played world No. 1 Roger Federer. Federer won in straight sets. He spent much of 2006 in the top 200, reaching a career-high of No. 186 on 1 May, and finished the year at No. 200 in singles.

=== 2007 ===
Istomin was slightly less successful in 2007, spending the entire year outside the top 200 in singles, but rallying towards the end of the year to finish at No. 230, again claiming the Asian Wild card for the 2008 Australian Open. In any case, he won two Challenger titles, Karshi and, for a second time, Bukhara. He reached his career-high of No. 157 on 18 June.

=== 2008 ===
Istomin entered the 2008 Australian Open as the Asian wild card. He lost in the second round to local favorite Lleyton Hewitt in four sets. Following successful results in a number of Challenger tournaments (including Karshi for the second time and Bukhara for the third time), he finished the season ranked No. 105.

=== 2009: Breaking the top 100 ===
Istomin again received the Asian wild card into the 2009 Australian Open. He played Vincent Spadea of the US in the first round and won in straight sets. He lost to Richard Gasquet in the second round. He had a more successful year, breaking into the top 100 for the first time and reaching world No. 56 in July. This ranking rise qualified him for main draw entry into the other Grand Slam tournaments. His best performance in the remaining Grand Slam events came at the 2009 US Open, where he reached the third round by defeating American wildcard Brendan Evans in straight sets, before earning a hard-fought win against Nicolás Lapentti in a fifth set tiebreak. He then lost against Marin Čilić in straight sets.

=== 2010: First ATP final & breaking top 50 ===
Istomin first competed in the 2010 Aircel Chennai Open, but was defeated in the first round by Dudi Sela. He then participated in the 2010 Australian Open. In the first round he routed No. 32 seed Jérémy Chardy and then defeated Michael Berrer in the second round. Istomin was defeated in the third round by No. 3 seed Novak Djokovic. He made his first semi-final at an ATP level tournament at the 2010 SAP Open, in San Jose. After beating Ryan Harrison in the opening round, he went on to beat fourth seed Tommy Haas and sixth seed Philipp Kohlschreiber en route to his first semis appearance. There, he lost to No. 2 seed Fernando Verdasco. At the 2010 Pilot Pen Tennis Istomin advanced to his first ATP Final, but was defeated by Sergiy Stakhovsky in three sets. This, along with third round appearances at Wimbledon and the French Open in 2010, sent him to his career high ranking of 39 on 30 August.

At the 2010 US Open Istomin defeated Máximo González in the first round. He was later defeated by No. 1 seed and eventual winner Rafael Nadal in the second round. Following this his ranking slipped down to No. 42. At the 2010 Asian Games tennis finals, Istomin lost to India's Somdev Devvarman in straight sets.

=== 2011 ===
Istomin started the year at number 40 in the ATP rankings, but had a poor run in the Australian swing, starting the year with a second round exit in Brisbane and then losing first round matches in the next two weeks in Sydney and then in the Australian Open.

He then reached the quarter-finals in San Jose until being stopped by Fernando Verdasco, then the world no. 9, before losing again two first rounds in a row in Memphis and Indian Wells. In the following week, Istomin reached the second round of Key Biscayne (losing to then world number 2, and triple Grand Slam winner that year, Novak Djokovic), before making another three consecutive first round exits on the clay circuit (Monte Carlo, Barcelona, Munich). After this he reached the second round in Nice on the lead-up to his second Grand Slam of the season, Roland Garros, where he lost his first round match to Italy's Fabio Fognini.

Istomin's poor run continued on grass, with first round exits at Queen's and Eastbourne. Istomin then beat Philipp Kohlschreiber in Wimbledon but lost to Mardy Fish, a top ten player then, in the second round. Amidst the European summer, he then returned to clay and made a second-round exit in Gstaad in between first-round losses in Hamburg and Kitzbühel. By mid-August, Istomin's ranking had slipped to 81 after a prolonged form slump. He travelled to his home country, Uzbekistan, to compete in two Challengers (Samarkand and Karshi), both of which won. It was his third victory in the Karshi Challenger.

He then moved to the US hard courts, losing in the second round of both the new Winston-Salem Open and the US Open, beaten by Julien Benneteau. Following the US Open, Istomin returned to the Challenger circuit, where he won consecutive tournaments in Istanbul and Tashkent. In the Istanbul final he beat Philipp Kohlschreiber, whom he had also beaten in Wimbledon. This was Istomin's first tournament victory outside Uzbekistan in his career. He had an uneventful end of the season, with a second round loss to Viktor Troicki in Kuala Lumpur's indoor courts, and, failing to qualify for further ATP 250, ATP 500 and ATP 1000 tournaments, ended the season with two early exit showings in the Bratislava and Helsinki Challengers. He finished the year at the 74th place of the rankings, still well inside the top-100

=== 2012: Career high ranking ===
Istomin defeated both Florian Mayer and Tommy Haas en route to a quarter-final loss to Bernard Tomic, in Brisbane. Still ranked No. 73 after the tournament, Istomin had to play the qualifying in Sydney, winning his three matches to qualify to the main draw, where he had an impressive run into the semi-finals as he swept past Pablo Andújar, Ryan Sweeting and 18-ranked Richard Gasquet, before losing to Jarkko Nieminen. The following week, at the Australian Open, Istomin was stopped by World No. 6 Jo-Wilfried Tsonga in the first round.

In February 2012, Istomin advanced to SAP Open finals, losing to defending champion Milos Raonic of Canada. After a first round loss in Memphis, and a second round loss in Delray Beach, Florida, he played one of his most successful tournaments at the Indian Wells Masters. He made the fourth round of the tournament (his previous best at a Masters tournament was the second round), beating No. 32 seed Juan Ignacio Chela and then the No. 5 player in the world, David Ferrer. He lost to Juan Martín del Potro to end his run. After nearly all first round defeats leading up to the French Open, his ranking was at 43 going into the tournament, losing to Rafael Nadal in the second round.

Following a second round loss at London/Queen's Club and a quarterfinal at Eastbourne, Istomin reached the fourth round of Wimbledon, becoming the first tennis player from Uzbekistan, man or woman, to make the fourth round of a Grand Slam. He lost in five sets to Mikhail Youzhny to end his bid for a quarterfinal appearance. At the Olympics, representing Uzbekistan, Istomin made the round of 16, losing to eventual silver medalist Roger Federer. During the USA hard court swing, Istomin made the second round of the Cincinnati Masters. At the US Open, he lost in the first round to Jürgen Zopp. He finished the year poorly, losing in all remaining tournaments in either the first or second round. During the Davis Cup that year, Istomin nearly led Uzbekistan to a World Group spot; Uzbekistan defeated New Zealand and India, but lost to Kazakhstan in the final playoff round.

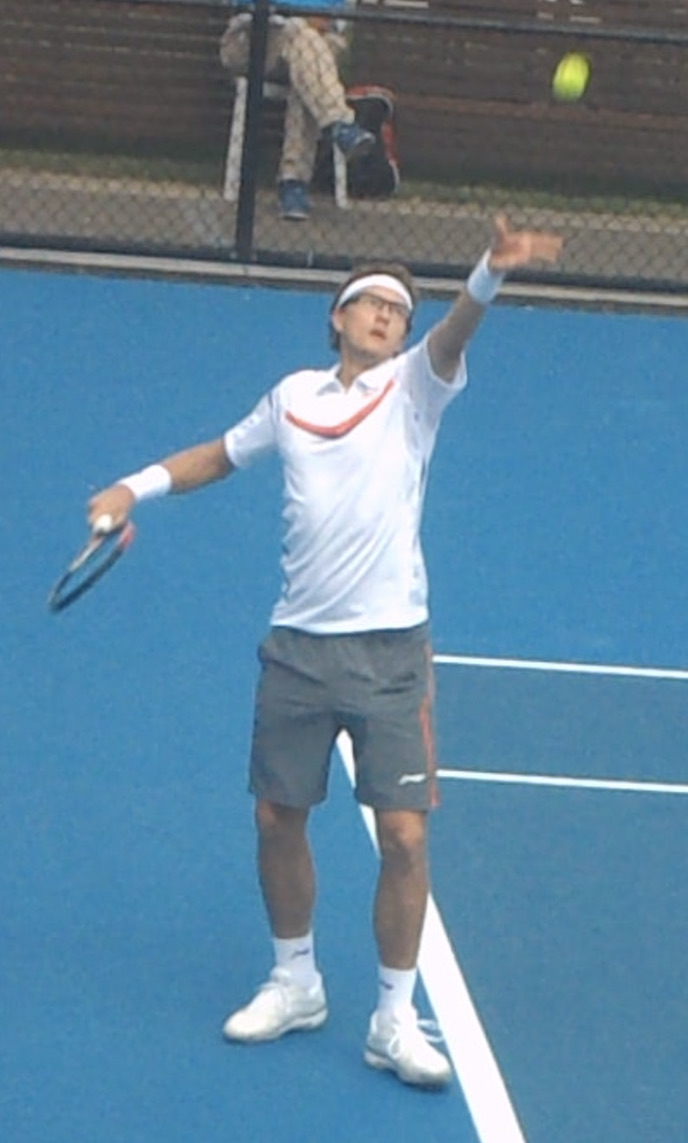
Istomin at the 2013 Apia International in Sydney

=== 2013: First doubles title ===
In January, Istomin advanced to the quarter-finals of the Brisbane International with wins over Martin Kližan and Lleyton Hewitt but was defeated by eventual champion Andy Murray. He then went on to enter the Apia International in Sydney, winning his first round and second round matches against James Duckworth and Fernando Verdasco to advance to the quarter-finals. He then lost to South African Kevin Anderson. Istomin reached the semi-finals of the U.S. National Indoor Tennis Championships where he beat John Isner, Lleyton Hewitt and Michael Russell before losing to eventual champion Feliciano López. At the Rogers Cup third round, he challenged No. 1 Novak Djokovic, winning the first set before losing in a close third set.

=== 2014 ===
Istomin would start the new year in the 2014 Apia International Sydney Tournament. He beat his first round opponent Pablo Andújar and then pulled off a huge upset to down 7th seed Croatian player Marin Čilić in straight sets. He played Novak Djokovic in the third round of the 2014 Australian Open. Despite being two sets down and possibly facing a break, he played what was considered by some to be the "Perfect Game". He won all four points in the game consecutively with an ace down the middle, a running cross-court forehand passing shot, a backhand cross-court that was placed exactly on the line and an around-the-net backhand from behind the baseline, all of which were considered extremely risky shots. However he went on to lose in straight sets.

=== 2015: First ATP singles title ===
Istomin won his first ATP world tour title at the Nottingham Open, where he defeated Sam Querrey in the final. Istomin also won a doubles title with Aliaksandr Bury later that year.

=== 2016 ===
Istomin lost in the first round in Australian Open. He earned first tour-level win of 2016 against Borna Ćorić at the Miami Open. In March in the 2016 Irving Challenger he beat John-Patrick Smith of Australia. Istomin reached third round in Wimbledon where he lost to David Goffin in four sets.

=== 2017: 200th and world No. 2 wins, Second title ===
Istomin, then ranked NO. 117 in the world, earned a wildcard to the 2017 Australian Open and upset defending champion and world No. 2 Novak Djokovic in the second round, coming back from 2 sets to 1 down to win in five sets. Istomin then went on to defeat Pablo Carreño Busta in the third round, advancing to the fourth round where he lost to Grigor Dimitrov.

Istomin would later win the 2017 Chengdu Open, overcoming Marcos Baghdatis in the final to win the second ATP title of his career.

=== 2018: Fifth ATP final, Gold medal at the Asian games ===
Istomin's form would slowly start to slip throughout 2018 as he lost in the first round of three for the four grand slams. His only slam win of the year coming at the Australian Open against Pierre-Hugues Herbert which remains his last slam win to date.

At the 2018 Austrian Open Kitzbühel, Istomin made his 5th ATP final and his last to date. He lost to Martin Kližan in straight sets.

At the 2018 Asian Games, Istomin won the gold medal in the men's singles which would earn him a spot at the 2020 Summer Olympics.

=== 2019–2020 ===
Istomin showed very poor form throughout 2019 and 2020. He posted a 4–15 win–loss record and his ranking dipped down to 177 by the end of 2019 and 184 by the end of 2020.

=== 2021: Third Olympics participation ===
At the 2021 French Open, Istomin made a surprise run through qualifying and qualified for the main draw. He lost to 8th seed Roger Federer in straight sets.

At the 2020 Olympics, Istomin faced Sumit Nagal in the first round where he lost in three sets.

=== 2024–: Singles retirement and doubles activity ===
In February 2024, Istomin announced his retirement following Uzbekistan's 2024 Davis Cup match against Poland. However, he continued to play doubles during the season with Russian player Evgeny Karlovskiy.

In 2025, Istomin came back for one singles Challenger match and played on the doubles circuit until May. In February 2026 he played one Davis Cup doubles match and then came back in May winning an ITF doubles event in Kutaisi (Georgia) with compatriot Maxim Shin.

== ATP Tour finals ==
=== Singles: 5 (2 titles, 3 runner-ups) ===
Legend Grand Slam (–) ATP 1000 (–) ATP 500 (–) ATP 250 (2–3)	Finals by surface Hard (1–2) Clay (0–1) Grass (1–0)	Finals by setting Outdoor (2–2) Indoor (0–1)

Result	W–L	Date	Tournament	Tier	Surface	Opponent	Score
Loss	0–1	Aug 2010	Connecticut Open, US	ATP 250	Hard	(Ukraine) Sergiy Stakhovsky	6–3, 3–6, 4–6
Loss	0–2	Feb 2012	Pacific Coast Championships, US	ATP 250	Hard (i)	(Canada) Milos Raonic	6–7^{(3–7)}, 2–6
Win	1–2	Jun 2015	Nottingham Open, UK	ATP 250	Grass	(United States) Sam Querrey	7–6^{(7–1)}, 7–6^{(8–6)}
Win	2–2	Oct 2017	Chengdu Open, China	ATP 250	Hard	(Cyprus) Marcos Baghdatis	3–2 ret.
Loss	2–3	Aug 2018	Austrian Open, Austria	ATP 250	Clay	(Slovakia) Martin Kližan	2–6, 2–6

=== Doubles: 5 (3 titles, 2 runner-ups) ===
Legend Grand Slam (–) ATP 1000 (–) ATP 500 (0–1) ATP 250 (3–1)	Finals by surface Hard (2–2) Clay (1–0) Grass (–)	Finals by setting Outdoor (1–1) Indoor (2–1)

Result	W–L	Date	Tournament	Tier	Surface	Partner	Opponents	Score
Loss	0–1	Oct 2012	China Open, China	ATP 500	Hard	(Argentina) Carlos Berlocq	(United States) Bob Bryan (United States) Mike Bryan	3–6, 2–6
Loss	0–2	Sep 2013	St. Petersburg Open, Russia	ATP 250	Hard (i)	(United Kingdom) Dominic Inglot	(Spain) David Marrero (Spain) Fernando Verdasco	6–7^{(6–8)}, 3–6
Win	1–2	Oct 2013	Kremlin Cup, Russia	ATP 250	Hard (i)	(Russia) Mikhail Elgin	(United Kingdom) Ken Skupski (United Kingdom) Neal Skupski	6–2, 1–6, [14–12]
Win	2–2	Feb 2014	Open Sud de France, France	ATP 250	Hard (i)	(Russia) Nikolay Davydenko	(France) Marc Gicquel (France) Nicolas Mahut	6–4, 1–6, [10–7]
Win	3–2	Aug 2015	Swiss Open Gstaad, Switzerland	ATP 250	Clay	(Belarus) Aliaksandr Bury	(Austria) Oliver Marach (Pakistan) Aisam-ul-Haq Qureshi	3–6, 6–2, [10–5]

== ATP Challenger and ITF Tour finals ==
=== Singles: 25 (17 titles, 8 runner-ups) ===
Legend ATP Challenger Tour (12–8) ITF Futures (5–0)	Finals by surface Hard (16–6) Clay (1–2)

Result	W–L	Date	Tournament	Tier	Surface	Opponent	Score
Win	1–0	Apr 2005	Uzbekistan F1, Qarshi	Futures	Hard	(Uzbekistan) Akmal Sharipov	6–3, 6–2
Win	2–0	May 2005	Uzbekistan F3, Namangan	Futures	Hard	(Russia) Alexander Markin	6–4, 7–6^{(7–5)}
Win	3–0	May 2005	Uzbekistan F4, Andijan	Futures	Hard	(China) Peng Sun	7–5, 6–3
Win	1–0	Aug 2005	Bukhara Challenger, Uzbekistan	Challenger	Hard	(Serbia and Montenegro) Ilija Bozoljac	6–4, 6–7^{(2–7)}, 6–5 Ret.
Win	4–0	Apr 2006	Uzbekistan F1, Qarshi	Futures	Hard	(Kazakhstan) Alexey Kedryuk	7–6^{(7–2)}, 6–4
Win	5–0	May 2007	Uzbekistan F1, Andijan	Futures	Hard	(Uzbekistan) Sarvar Ikramov	7–6^{(7–3)}, 6–3
Win	2–0	Aug 2007	Bukhara Challenger, Uzbekistan (2)	Challenger	Hard	(Israel) Amir Weintraub	3–6, 6–1, 6–4
Win	3–0	Aug 2007	Qarshi Challenger, Uzbekistan	Challenger	Hard	(Turkey) Marsel İlhan	6–1, 6–4
Loss	3–1	Aug 2008	Mordovia Cup, Russia	Challenger	Clay	(Russia) Mikhail Elgin	6–7^{(6–8)}, 6–3, 3–6
Win	4–1	Aug 2008	Bukhara Challenger, Uzbekistan (3)	Challenger	Hard	(Ukraine) Illya Marchenko	4–6, 6–2, 6–4
Win	5–1	Aug 2008	Qarshi Challenger, Uzbekistan (2)	Challenger	Hard	(Russia) Mikhail Elgin	6–3, 7–6^{(7–4)}
Loss	5–2	Sep 2008	Cherkassy Open, Ukraine	Challenger	Clay	(France) Olivier Patience	2–6, 0–6
Loss	5–3	Sep 2009	Tashkent Challenger, Uzbekistan	Challenger	Hard	(Cyprus) Marcos Baghdatis	3–6, 6–1, 3–6
Win	6–3	Aug 2011	Samarkand Challenger, Uzbekistan	Challenger	Clay	(Tunisia) Malek Jaziri	7–6^{(7–2)} Ret.
Win	7–3	Aug 2011	Qarshi Challenger, Uzbekistan (3)	Challenger	Hard	(Slovenia) Blaž Kavčič	6–3, 1–6, 6–1
Win	8–3	Sep 2011	Istanbul Challenger, Turkey	Challenger	Hard	(Germany) Philipp Kohlschreiber	7–6^{(8–6)}, 6–4
Win	9–3	Sep 2011	Tashkent Challenger, Uzbekistan	Challenger	Hard	(Estonia) Jürgen Zopp	6–4, 6–3
Win	10–3	Oct 2015	Tashkent Challenger, Uzbekistan (2)	Challenger	Hard	(Slovakia) Lukáš Lacko	6–3, 6–4
Loss	10–4	Oct 2016	Tashkent Challenger, Uzbekistan	Challenger	Hard	(Russia) Konstantin Kravchuk	5–7, 4–6
Loss	10–5	Nov 2016	Astana Challenger, Kazakhstan	Challenger	Hard (i)	(Japan) Yoshihito Nishioka	4–6, 7–6^{(7–4)}, 6–7^{(3–7)}
Win	11–5	Sep 2018	Oracle Challenger Chicago, US	Challenger	Hard	(United States) Reilly Opelka	6–4, 6–2
Win	12–5	Oct 2018	Almaty Challenger, Kazakhstan	Challenger	Hard	(Serbia) Nikola Milojević	6–7^{(4–7)}, 7–6^{(7–5)}, 6–2
Loss	12–6	Sep 2019	Istanbul Challenger, Turkey	Challenger	Hard	(France) Ugo Humbert	2–6, 2–6
Loss	12–7	Oct 2019	Liuzhou Open, China	Challenger	Clay	(Spain) Alejandro Davidovich Fokina	3–6, 7–5, 6–7^{(5–7)}
Loss	12–8	Mar 2020	Columbus Challenger, US	Challenger	Hard (i)	(United States) J. J. Wolf	4–6, 2–6

== Performance timelines ==
Key
W	F	SF	QF	#R	RR	Q#	P#	DNQ	A	Z#	PO	G	S	B	NMS	NTI	P	NH

(W) winner; (F) finalist; (SF) semifinalist; (QF) quarterfinalist; (#R) rounds 4, 3, 2, 1; (RR) round-robin stage; (Q#) qualification round; (P#) preliminary round; (DNQ) did not qualify; (A) absent; (Z#) Davis/Fed Cup Zonal Group (with number indication) or (PO) play-off; (G) gold, (S) silver or (B) bronze Olympic/Paralympic medal; (NMS) not a Masters tournament; (NTI) not a Tier I tournament; (P) postponed; (NH) not held; (SR) strike rate (events won / competed); (W–L) win–loss record.
To avoid confusion and double counting, these charts are updated at the conclusion of a tournament or when the player's participation has ended.

=== Singles ===
Current through the 2022 Delray Beach Open.

Tournament	2004	2005	2006	2007	2008	2009	2010	2011	2012	2013	2014	2015	2016	2017	2018	2019	2020	2021	2022	SR	W–L	Win%
Grand Slam tournaments
Australian Open	A	A	1R	Q1	2R	2R	3R	1R	1R	2R	3R	1R	1R	4R	2R	1R	A	Q1	A	0 / 13	11–13	46%
French Open	A	A	A	A	Q1	2R	2R	1R	2R	2R	2R	1R	1R	2R	1R	Q1	A	1R	A	0 / 11	6–11	37%
Wimbledon	A	A	A	A	A	1R	3R	2R	4R	1R	3R	1R	3R	1R	1R	1R	NH	A	A	0 / 11	10–11	48%
US Open	A	A	A	A	A	3R	2R	2R	1R	4R	1R	2R	1R	1R	1R	Q1	A	Q1	A	0 / 10	8–10	44%
Win–loss	0–0	0–0	0–1	0–0	1–1	4–4	6–4	2–4	4–4	5–4	5–4	1–4	2–4	4–4	1–4	0–2	0–0	0–1	0–0	0 / 45	35–45	44%
Olympic Games
Summer Olympics	A	Not Held			A	Not Held			3R	Not Held			1R	Not Held				1R	NH	0 / 3	2–3	40%
ATP Masters Series
Indian Wells Masters	A	A	A	A	A	A	A	1R	4R	2R	1R	2R	1R	Q1	A	1R	NH	Q1	A	0 / 7	5–7	42%
Miami Masters	A	A	A	A	A	A	1R	2R	1R	1R	3R	1R	2R	1R	2R	Q2	NH	A	A	0 / 9	5–9	36%
Monte Carlo Masters	A	A	A	A	A	A	A	1R	1R	1R	Q1	Q2	Q1	A	Q1	A	NH	A	A	0 / 3	0–3	0%
Madrid Masters	A	A	A	A	A	A	A	A	1R	2R	A	A	2R	1R	Q1	A	NH	A	A	0 / 4	2–4	33%
Rome Masters	A	A	A	A	A	A	A	A	1R	2R	A	Q1	A	Q2	A	A	A	A	A	0 / 2	1–2	33%
Canada Masters	A	A	A	A	A	A	1R	A	A	3R	1R	A	A	A	A	A	NH	A	A	0 / 3	2–3	40%
Cincinnati Masters	A	A	A	A	A	A	2R	A	2R	1R	1R	Q2	A	Q1	A	A	A	A	A	0 / 4	2–4	33%
Shanghai Masters	Not Masters Series					A	1R	A	2R	A	1R	A	A	A	A	A	NH			0 / 3	1–3	25%
Paris Masters	A	A	A	A	A	A	1R	Q1	1R	1R	1R	A	A	Q1	A	A	A	A	A	0 / 4	0–4	0%
Win–loss	0–0	0–0	0–0	0–0	0–0	0–0	1–5	1–3	5–8	5–8	2–6	1–2	2–3	0–2	1–1	0–1	0–0	0–0	0–0	0 / 39	18–39	32%
Career statistics
	2004	2005	2006	2007	2008	2009	2010	2011	2012	2013	2014	2015	2016	2017	2018	2019	2020	2021	2022	Career		
Tournaments	0	0	2	0	2	17	29	21	30	29	24	24	20	19	18	11	1	3	1	251		
Titles / Finals	0 / 0	0 / 0	0 / 0	0 / 0	0 / 0	0 / 0	0 / 1	0 / 0	0 / 1	0 / 0	0 / 0	1 / 1	0 / 0	1 / 1	0 / 1	0 / 0	0 / 0	0 / 0	0 / 0	2 / 5		
Overall win–loss	0–0	2–1	2–3	2–1	6–2	16–18	32–29	12–22	30–32	32–30	28–26	23–24	9–21	17–18	14–19	4–12	0–3	0–4	1–1	2 / 251	230–266	
Win %	N/A	67%	40%	67%	75%	47%	52%	35%	48%	52%	52%	49%	30%	49%	42%	25%	0%	0%	50%	46.37%		
Year-end ranking	858	196	200	230	105	102	40	72	43	45	49	61	121	63	92	177	184	244	480	46.37%		

=== Doubles ===
Tournament	2009	2010	2011	2012	2013	2014	2015	2016	2017	2018	2019	2020	2021	2022	W–L
Grand Slam tournaments
Australian Open	A	A	1R	2R	1R	1R	2R	1R	A	1R	A	A	A	A	2–7
French Open	A	2R	3R	3R	2R	1R	2R	1R	2R	A	A	A	A		8–8
Wimbledon	A	1R	1R	3R	1R	1R	A	A	A	A	A	NH	A		2–5
US Open	1R	1R	2R	1R	1R	1R	2R	A	A	1R	A	A	A		2–8
Win–loss	0–1	1–3	3–4	5–4	1–4	0–4	3–3	0–2	1–1	0–2	0–0	0–0	0–0	0–0	14–28

== Wins over top 10 players ==
- Istomin has a 2–36 record against players who were ranked in the top 10 at the time the match was played.

Season	2004	2005	2006	2007	2008	2009	2010	2011	2012	2013	2014	2015	2016	2017	2018	2019	2020	2021	Total
Wins	0	0	0	0	0	0	0	0	1	0	0	0	0	1	0	0	0	0	2

#	Player	Rank	Event	Surface	Rd	Score	DIR
2012
1.	(Spain) David Ferrer	5	Indian Wells, United States	Hard	3R	6–4, 6–3	51
2017
2.	(Serbia) Novak Djokovic	2	Australian Open, Melbourne, Australia	Hard	2R	7–6^{(10–8)}, 5–7, 2–6, 7–6^{(7–5)}, 6–4	117
