= Chengdu Open =

ATP Tour
- Event name: Chengdu Open
- Tour: ATP Tour
- Founded: 2016; 10 years ago
- Location: Chengdu; China
- Venue: Sichuan International Tennis Center
- Category: ATP 250
- Surface: Hard / Outdoor
- Prize money: US$1,190,210
- Website: chengduopentennis.com

Current champions (2026)
- Singles: (Spain) Alejandro Davidovich Fokina
- Doubles: (United Kingdom) Luke Johnson (Poland) Jan Zieliński

The Chengdu Open is a men's ATP Tour 250 series tournament played on outdoor hardcourts. It was a new tournament added to the 2016 ATP World Tour and replaces the ATP Malaysian Open event held in Kuala Lumpur. It takes place at the Sichuan International Tennis Center in Chengdu, China.

== Results ==
=== Singles ===
Year	Champion	Runner-up	Score
2016	(Russia) Karen Khachanov	(Spain) Albert Ramos Viñolas	6–7^{(4–7)}, 7–6^{(7–3)}, 6–3
2017	(Uzbekistan) Denis Istomin	(Cyprus) Marcos Baghdatis	3–2 ret.
2018	(Australia) Bernard Tomic	(Italy) Fabio Fognini	6–1, 3–6, 7–6^{(9–7)}
2019	(Spain) Pablo Carreño Busta	(Kazakhstan) Alexander Bublik	6–7^{(5–7)}, 6–4, 7–6^{(7–3)}
2020–2022	Not held due to COVID-19 pandemic		
2023	(Germany) Alexander Zverev	Roman Safiullin	6–7^{(2–7)}, 7–6^{(7–5)}, 6–3
2024	(China) Shang Juncheng	(Italy) Lorenzo Musetti	7–6^{(7–4)}, 6–1
2025	(Chile) Alejandro Tabilo	(Italy) Lorenzo Musetti	6–3, 2–6, 7–6^{(7–5)}
2026	(Spain) Alejandro Davidovich Fokina	(Poland) Hubert Hurkacz	6–4, 7–6^{(9–7)}

=== Doubles ===
Year	Champion	Runner-up	Score
2016	(South Africa) Raven Klaasen (United States) Rajeev Ram	(Spain) Pablo Carreño Busta (Poland) Mariusz Fyrstenberg	7–6^{(7–2)}, 7–5
2017	(Israel) Jonathan Erlich (Pakistan) Aisam-ul-Haq Qureshi	(New Zealand) Marcus Daniell (Brazil) Marcelo Demoliner	6–3, 7–6^{(7–3)}
2018	(Croatia) Ivan Dodig (Croatia) Mate Pavić	(United States) Austin Krajicek (India) Jeevan Nedunchezhiyan	6–2, 6–4
2019	(Serbia) Nikola Ćaćić (Serbia) Dušan Lajović	(Israel) Jonathan Erlich (France) Fabrice Martin	7–6^{(11–9)}, 3–6, [10–3]
2020–2022	Not held due to COVID-19 pandemic		
2023	(France) Sadio Doumbia (France) Fabien Reboul	(Portugal) Francisco Cabral (Brazil) Rafael Matos	4–6, 7–5, [10–7]
2024	(France) Sadio Doumbia (France) Fabien Reboul	(India) Yuki Bhambri (France) Albano Olivetti	6–4, 4–6, [10–4]
2025	(Germany) Constantin Frantzen (Netherlands) Robin Haase	(United States) Vasil Kirkov (Netherlands) Bart Stevens	4–6, 6–3, [10–7]
2026	(United Kingdom) Luke Johnson (Poland) Jan Zieliński	(United States) Robert Galloway (Sweden) André Göransson	7–6^{(9–7)}, 7–5
