= 2014 Türk Telecom İzmir Cup – Singles =

Singles
- 2014 Türk Telecom İzmir Cup

Final
- Champion: (Croatia) Borna Ćorić
- Runner-up: (Tunisia) Malek Jaziri
- Score: 6–1, 6–7^{(7–9)}, 6–4

Events
Singles	Doubles
← 2013 ·	Türk Telecom İzmir Cup	· 2015 →

Mikhail Kukushkin was the defending champion, but did not take part this year.

Borna Ćorić won the title by defeating Malek Jaziri 6–1, 6–7^{(7–9)}, 6–4 in the final.

== Seeds ==
1. (Tunisia) Malek Jaziri (final)
2. (Serbia) Filip Krajinović (first round, retired due to stomachache)
3. (Russia) Alexander Kudryavtsev (first round)
4. (Russia) Evgeny Donskoy (first round)
5. (Croatia) Ante Pavić (second round)
6. (Turkey) Marsel İlhan (semifinals)
7. (Ukraine) Illya Marchenko (quarterfinals)
8. (Germany) Alexander Zverev (first round)

== Draw ==
=== Key ===
- Q = Qualifier
- WC = Wild card
- LL = Lucky loser
- Alt = Alternate
- SE = Special exempt
- PR = Protected ranking
- ITF = ITF entry
- JE = Junior exempt
- w/o = Walkover
- r = Retired
- d = Defaulted
- SR = Special ranking

=== Finals ===
Semifinals
1	(Tunisia) Malek Jaziri	6	3	6
Q	(Russia) Mikhail Ledovskikh	4	6	2
(Croatia) Borna Ćorić	6	3	6
6	(Turkey) Marsel İlhan	2	6	4

Final
1	(Tunisia) Malek Jaziri	1	7^{9}	4
(Croatia) Borna Ćorić	6	6^{7}	6

=== Top half ===
First round
1	(Tunisia) M Jaziri	6	3
PR	(Germany) P Petzschner	1	0^{r}
WC	(Turkey) C İlkel	5	6	7^{9}
(Italy) T Fabbiano	7	4	6^{7}
Q	(Russia) V Baluda	2	1
(Bosnia and Herzegovina) A Šetkić	6	6
(Republic of Ireland) L Sorensen	3	4
7	(Ukraine) I Marchenko	6	6
4	(Russia) E Donskoy	6	3	4
(Bosnia and Herzegovina) M Bašić	4	6	6
(Russia) K Kravchuk	6	3	6
(Japan) H Moriya	4	6	2
Q	(Russia) M Ledovskikh	6	6
(Italy) L Vanni	2	1
WC	(Turkey) Efe Yurtaçan	0	7	4
5	(Croatia) A Pavić	6	5	6

Second round
1	(Tunisia) M Jaziri	6	6
(Turkey) C İlkel	3	2
(Bosnia and Herzegovina) A Šetkić	4	7	3
7	(Ukraine) I Marchenko	6	5	6
(Bosnia and Herzegovina) M Bašić	7	6
(Russia) K Kravchuk	5	0
Q	(Russia) M Ledovskikh	7^{7}	6
5	(Croatia) A Pavić	6^{3}	1

Quarterfinals
1	(Tunisia) M Jaziri	5	6	7^{7}
7	(Ukraine) I Marchenko	7	2	6^{0}
(Bosnia and Herzegovina) M Bašić	6^{3}	4
Q	(Russia) M Ledovskikh	7^{7}	6

Semifinals
(Tunisia) M Jaziri	6	3	6
Q	(Russia) M Ledovskikh	4	6	2

=== Bottom half ===
First round
8	(Germany) A Zverev	3	2
Q	(Belarus) Y Shyla	6	6
(Serbia) I Bozoljac	2	3
(Croatia) B Ćorić	6	6
(Russia) V Rudnev	6	6
WC	(Turkey) T Altuna	3	0
(Belarus) E Gerasimov	6	6^{4}	6
3	(Russia) A Kudryavtsev	3	7^{7}	1
6	(Turkey) M İlhan	6	4	7
(Spain) R Ortega Olmedo	4	6	5
(Switzerland) Y Marti	3	6	6
LL	(Belarus) D Zhyrmont	6	3	2
WC	(Turkey) B Ergüden	4	3
(Bosnia and Herzegovina) T Brkić	6	6
Q	(South Africa) T Vorster	6	1
2	(Serbia) F Krajinović	1	0^{r}

Second round
Q	(Belarus) Y Shyla	0	1
(Croatia) B Ćorić	6	6
(Russia) V Rudnev	1	4
(Belarus) E Gerasimov	6	6
6	(Turkey) M İlhan	4	7^{8}	7
(Switzerland) Y Marti	6	6^{6}	5
(Bosnia and Herzegovina) T Brkić	7^{7}	7
Q	(South Africa) T Vorster	6^{4}	5

Quarterfinals
(Croatia) B Ćorić	6	6
(Belarus) E Gerasimov	2	4
6	(Turkey) M İlhan	6	7^{7}
(Bosnia and Herzegovina) T Brkić	2	6^{3}

Semifinals
(Croatia) B Ćorić	6	3	6
6	(Turkey) M İlhan	2	6	4
