= 2015 Türk Telecom İzmir Cup – Singles =

Singles
- 2015 Türk Telecom İzmir Cup

Final
- Champion: (Slovakia) Lukáš Lacko
- Runner-up: (Romania) Marius Copil
- Score: 6–3, 7–6^{(7–5)}

Events
Singles	Doubles
← 2014 ·	Türk Telecom İzmir Cup	· 2016 →

Borna Ćorić was the defending champion but chose not to participate this year.

== Seeds ==
1. (Turkey) Marsel İlhan (quarterfinals)
2. (Tunisia) Malek Jaziri (semifinals)
3. (Russia) Andrey Kuznetsov (withdrew)
4. (Slovakia) Lukáš Lacko (champion)
5. (Spain) Adrián Menéndez-Maceiras (withdrew)
6. (Sweden) Elias Ymer (first round)
7. (Bosnia and Herzegovina) Mirza Bašić (semifinals)
8. (Uzbekistan) Farrukh Dustov (quarterfinals)

== Draw ==
=== Key ===
- Q = Qualifier
- WC = Wild card
- LL = Lucky loser
- Alt = Alternate
- SE = Special exempt
- PR = Protected ranking
- ITF = ITF entry
- JE = Junior exempt
- w/o = Walkover
- r = Retired
- d = Defaulted
- SR = Special ranking

=== Finals ===
Semifinals
7	(Bosnia and Herzegovina) Mirza Bašić	3	4
(Romania) Marius Copil	6	6
4	(Slovakia) Lukáš Lacko	6^{3}	6	6
2	(Tunisia) Malek Jaziri	7^{7}	3	3

Final
(Romania) Marius Copil	3	6^{5}
4	(Slovakia) Lukáš Lacko	6	7^{7}

=== Top half ===
First round
1	(Turkey) M İlhan	6	6
(Belgium) Y Mertens	2	3
(Serbia) Ivan Bjelica	7	6
WC	(Turkey) B Ergüden	5	3
(India) S Myneni	5	4
(Croatia) M Pecotić	7	6
Q	(Cyprus) P Chrysochos	6^{4}	5
7	(Bosnia and Herzegovina) M Bašić	7^{7}	7
(Romania) M Copil	4	6	6
(Russia) A Karatsev	6	3	4
WC	(Turkey) S Ağabigün	5	0
Q	(Belarus) I Ivashka	7	6
(Bosnia and Herzegovina) A Šetkić	6	6
PR	(Switzerland) M Chiudinelli	1	1
(Kazakhstan) D Popko	6	5	6^{4}
8	(Uzbekistan) F Dustov	4	7	7^{7}

Second round
1	(Turkey) M İlhan	3	6	6
(Serbia) I Bjelica	6	4	4
(Croatia) M Pecotić	6	3	5
7	(Bosnia and Herzegovina) M Bašić	3	6	7
(Romania) M Copil	7^{7}	5	6
Q	(Belarus) I Ivashka	6^{4}	7	4
(Bosnia and Herzegovina) A Šetkić	4	6^{1}
8	(Uzbekistan) F Dustov	6	7^{7}

Quarterfinals
1	(Turkey) M İlhan	4	7^{7}	3
7	(Bosnia and Herzegovina) M Bašić	6	6^{3}	6
(Romania) M Copil	6	6
8	(Uzbekistan) F Dustov	2	0

Semifinals
7	(Bosnia and Herzegovina) M Bašić	3	4
(Romania) M Copil	6	6

=== Bottom half ===
First round
6	(Sweden) E Ymer	7^{7}	3	5
(India) R Ramanathan	6^{3}	6	7
LL	(Austria) M Neuchrist	6^{5}	0
Q	(Germany) D Masur	7^{7}	6
WC	(Turkey) A Çelikbilek	4	6^{4}
(Lithuania) L Grigelis	6	7^{7}
WC	(Turkey) Barkin Yalcinkale	0	1
4	(Slovakia) L Lacko	6	6
LL	(Czech Republic) Michal Konecny	6	6
(Ukraine) D Molchanov	3	3
Q	(Georgia (country)) A Metreveli	6	6^{2}	7^{7}
(Italy) Erik Crepaldi	4	7^{7}	6^{0}
LL	(Belarus) A Vasilevski	6	6
(France) G Barrère	4	4
(South Africa) T Vorster	2	6	1
2	(Tunisia) M Jaziri	6	3	6

Second round
(India) R Ramanathan	4	7^{7}	7^{7}
Q	(Germany) D Masur	6	6^{4}	6^{3}
(Lithuania) L Grigelis	1	4
4	(Slovakia) L Lacko	6	6
LL	(Czech Republic) M Konecny	6	3	3
Q	(Georgia (country)) A Metreveli	3	6	6
LL	(Belarus) A Vasilevski	4	6^{3}
2	(Tunisia) M Jaziri	6	7^{7}

Quarterfinals
(India) R Ramanathan	3	5
4	(Slovakia) L Lacko	6	7
Q	(Georgia (country)) A Metreveli	4	6^{4}
2	(Tunisia) M Jaziri	6	7^{7}

Semifinals
4	(Slovakia) L Lacko	6^{3}	6	6
2	(Tunisia) M Jaziri	7^{7}	3	3
