= 2009 Türk Telecom İzmir Cup – Singles =

Singles
- 2009 Türk Telecom İzmir Cup

Final
- Champion: (Italy) Andrea Stoppini
- Runner-up: (Turkey) Marsel İlhan
- Score: 7–6(5), 6–2

Events
Singles	Doubles
- Türk Telecom İzmir Cup

Gilles Müller was the champion in 2008 but did not play this year.
Andrea Stoppini became the new champion, defeating Marsel İlhan in the final 7–6(5), 6–2.

== Seeds ==
1. (Chinese Taipei) Lu Yen-hsun (first round)
2. (Ukraine) Sergiy Stakhovsky (first round)
3. (Germany) Michael Berrer (first round)
4. (Germany) Benedikt Dorsch (first round)
5. (Russia) Michail Elgin (first round)
6. (Australia) Chris Guccione (second round)
7. (Slovakia) Karol Beck (first round)
8. (India) Prakash Amritraj (second round)

== Draw ==
Key

- Q = Qualifier
- WC = Wild card
- LL = Lucky loser
- Alt = Alternate
- ITF = ITF entry
- PR = Protected ranking
- SR = Special ranking
- SE = Special exempt
- JE = Junior exempt
- JR = Junior Accelerator Programme entrant
- CO = College Accelerator Programme entrant
- NG = Next Gen Accelerator Program entrant
- w/o = Walkover
- r = Retired
- d = Defaulted

=== Final four ===
Semifinals
(Turkey) Marsel İlhan	7	6
(Israel) Harel Levy	5	3
(Sweden) Joachim Johansson	w/o
(Italy) Andrea Stoppini

Final
(Turkey) Marsel İlhan	6^{5}	2
(Italy) Andrea Stoppini	7	6

=== Top half ===
First round
1	(Chinese Taipei) Y-h Lu	6	6^{5}	3
(Italy) P Lorenzi	2	7	6
(Ukraine) I Marchenko	6	6
WC	(Turkey) E Zorlu	2	3
Q	(Germany) M Bachinger	6^{6}	6^{7}
(Turkey) M İlhan	7	7
(Russia) A Kudryavtsev	6^{4}	4
6	(Australia) C Guccione	7	6
3	(Germany) M Berrer	4	3
(Ukraine) S Bubka	6	6
WC	(Turkey) S Beceren	0	0
(Israel) H Levy	6	6
WC	(Turkey) B Ergüden	1	1
(Czech Republic) P Šnobel	6	6
(South Africa) R de Voest	3	6^{4}
8	(India) P Amritraj	6	7

Second round
(Italy) P Lorenzi	6	6
(Ukraine) I Marchenko	3	4
(Turkey) M İlhan	6	7
6	(Australia) C Guccione	4	6^{4}
(Ukraine) S Bubka	6^{2}	3
(Israel) H Levy	7	6
(Czech Republic) P Šnobel	6	6
8	(India) P Amritraj	2	4

Quarterfinals
(Italy) P Lorenzi	4	4
(Turkey) M İlhan	6	6
(Israel) H Levy	6	6
(Czech Republic) P Šnobel	0	2

Semifinals
(Turkey) M İlhan	7	6
(Israel) H Levy	5	3

=== Bottom half ===
First round
7	(Slovakia) K Beck	1	3
Q	(Republic of Ireland) C Niland	6	6
(United States) T Widom	3	2
(Sweden) J Johansson	6	6
(Sweden) B Rehnquist	3	4
Q	(Ukraine) I Sergeyev	6	6
LL	(United Kingdom) J Goodall	7	6
4	(Germany) B Dorsch	6^{5}	4
5	(Russia) M Elgin	1	4
(Germany) D Meffert	6	6
(United Kingdom) A Bogdanovic	7	6
WC	(Turkey) H Akkoyun	6^{4}	4
(Australia) B Klein	4	1
Q	(Australia) J Sirianni	6	6
(Italy) A Stoppini	6	6
2	(Ukraine) S Stakhovsky	3	3

Second round
Q	(Republic of Ireland) C Niland	4	6	3
(Sweden) J Johansson	6	2	6
Q	(Ukraine) I Sergeyev	6^{2}	6^{4}
LL	(United Kingdom) J Goodall	7	7
(Germany) D Meffert	6	6
(United Kingdom) A Bogdanovic	3	2
Q	(Australia) J Sirianni	2	5
(Italy) A Stoppini	6	7

Quarterfinals
(Sweden) J Johansson	7	6
LL	(United Kingdom) J Goodall	5	3
(Germany) D Meffert	3	4
(Italy) A Stoppini	6	6

Semifinals
(Sweden) J Johansson	w/o
(Italy) A Stoppini
