= 2013 Türk Telecom İzmir Cup – Singles =

Singles
- 2013 Türk Telecom İzmir Cup

Final
- Champion: (Kazakhstan) Mikhail Kukushkin
- Runner-up: (Republic of Ireland) Louk Sorensen
- Score: 6–1, 6–4

Events
Singles	Doubles
← 2012 ·	Türk Telecom İzmir Cup	· 2014 →

Dmitry Tursunov was the defending champion but decided not to participate.
Top seed Mikhail Kukushkin defeated surprise finalist qualifier Louk Sorensen in the final.

== Seeds ==
1. (Kazakhstan) Mikhail Kukushkin (champion)
2. (Ukraine) Illya Marchenko (second round)
3. (Germany) Peter Gojowczyk (quarterfinals)
4. (Turkey) Marsel İlhan (quarterfinals)
5. (Tunisia) Malek Jaziri (quarterfinals)
6. (Spain) Adrián Menéndez Maceiras (quarterfinals)
7. (Belarus) Uladzimir Ignatik (first round)
8. (Italy) Flavio Cipolla (semifinals)

== Draw ==
=== Key ===
- Q = Qualifier
- WC = Wild card
- LL = Lucky loser
- Alt = Alternate
- SE = Special exempt
- PR = Protected ranking
- ITF = ITF entry
- JE = Junior exempt
- w/o = Walkover
- r = Retired
- d = Defaulted
- SR = Special ranking

=== Finals ===
Semifinals
1	(Kazakhstan) Mikhail Kukushkin	5	6	6
8	(Italy) Flavio Cipolla	7	1	4
Q	(Republic of Ireland) Louk Sorensen	6	6
(China) Wu Di	4	2

Final
1	(Kazakhstan) Mikhail Kukushkin	6	6
Q	(Republic of Ireland) Louk Sorensen	1	4

=== Top half ===
First round
1	(Kazakhstan) M Kukushkin	6	6
(Belarus) D Zhyrmont	3	3
(Georgia (country)) N Basilashvili	4	6^{7}
(Bosnia and Herzegovina) M Bašić	6	7^{9}
Q	(Spain) A Artuñedo Martínavarr	6	6
WC	(Turkey) B Ergüden	1	1
(Austria) M Neuchrist	4	4
5	(Tunisia) M Jaziri	6	6
4	(Turkey) M İlhan	6	6
WC;	(Turkey) Efe Yurtacan	2	2
WC	(Turkey) T Altuna	3	2
(Republic of Ireland) J McGee	6	6
(France) Jules Marie	5	0
(Belgium) Y Mertens	7	6
(Bosnia and Herzegovina) A Šetkić	4	2
8	(Italy) F Cipolla	6	6

Second round
1	(Kazakhstan) M Kukushkin	6	6
(Bosnia and Herzegovina) M Bašić	3	3
Q	(Spain) A Artuñedo Martínavarr	3	2
5	(Tunisia) M Jaziri	6	6
4	(Turkey) M İlhan	6	1	6
(Republic of Ireland) J McGee	3	6	2
(Belgium) Y Mertens	2	2
8	(Italy) F Cipolla	6	6

Quarterfinals
1	(Kazakhstan) M Kukushkin	5	7^{8}	6
5	(Tunisia) M Jaziri	7	6^{6}	4
4	(Turkey) M İlhan	2	0
8	(Italy) F Cipolla	6	6

Semifinals
1	(Kazakhstan) M Kukushkin	5	6	6
8	(Italy) F Cipolla	7	1	4

=== Bottom half ===
First round
7	(Belarus) U Ignatik	1	3
Q	(Republic of Ireland) L Sorensen	6	6
(United Kingdom) B Klein	7	2	6
(Australia) D Propoggia	5	6	2
Q	(Romania) T-D Crăciun	1	3
(Russia) A Lobkov	6	6
(Austria) M Fischer	6	4	6^{3}
3	(Germany) P Gojowczyk	4	6	7^{7}
6	(Spain) A Menéndez Maceiras	6	6
(United States) A Krajicek	3	4
(United States) T Sandgren	6	6
Q	(United Kingdom) D Rice	1	4
(China) D Wu	6	6
WC	(Turkey) A Yüksel	2	1
(Egypt) M Safwat	6^{3}	3
2	(Ukraine) I Marchenko	7^{7}	6

Second round
Q	(Republic of Ireland) L Sorensen	6	2
(United Kingdom) B Klein	3	0^{r}
(Russia) A Lobkov	6	3	4
3	(Germany) P Gojowczyk	1	6	6
6	(Spain) A Menéndez Maceiras	6^{4}	6	7^{7}
(United States) T Sandgren	7^{7}	4	6^{3}
(China) D Wu	5	7^{7}	6
2	(Ukraine) I Marchenko	7	6^{3}	2

Quarterfinals
Q	(Republic of Ireland) L Sorensen	6	6
3	(Germany) P Gojowczyk	2	2
6	(Spain) A Menéndez Maceiras	2	4
(China) D Wu	6	6

Semifinals
Q	(Republic of Ireland) L Sorensen	6	6
(China) D Wu	4	2
