= 2009 Türk Telecom İzmir Cup =

- Date: May 11–17, 2009
- Edition: 2nd
- Location: İzmir, Turkey

Champions

Singles
- (Italy) Andrea Stoppini

Doubles
- (Israel) Jonathan Erlich / (Israel) Harel Levy
- Türk Telecom İzmir Cup

The 2009 Türk Telecom İzmir Cup was a professional tennis tournament played on outdoor hard courts. It was part of the 2009 ATP Challenger Tour. It took place in İzmir, Turkey between May 11 and May 17, 2009.

== Singles entrants ==
=== Seeds ===
Nationality	Player	Ranking*	Seeding
TPE	Lu Yen-hsun	67	1
UKR	Sergiy Stakhovsky	115	2
GER	Michael Berrer	116	3
GER	Benedikt Dorsch	133	4
RUS	Mikhail Elgin	134	5
AUS	Chris Guccione	147	6
SVK	Karol Beck	152	7
IND	Prakash Amritraj	166	8

- Rankings are as of May 4, 2009.

=== Other entrants ===
The following players received wildcards into the singles main draw:

- (Turkey) Haluk Akkoyun
- (Turkey) Sami Beceren
- (Turkey) Barış Ergüden
- (Turkey) Ergün Zorlu

The following players received entry from the qualifying draw:

- (Germany) Matthias Bachinger
- (United Kingdom) Joshua Goodall (as a Lucky loser)
- (Republic of Ireland) Conor Niland
- (Ukraine) Ivan Sergeyev
- (Australia) Joseph Sirianni

== Champions ==
=== Singles ===
(Italy) Andrea Stoppini def. (Turkey) Marsel İlhan, 7–6(5), 6–2

=== Doubles ===
(Israel) Jonathan Erlich / (Israel) Harel Levy def. (India) Prakash Amritraj / (United States) Rajeev Ram, 6–3, 6–3
