= 2013 Türk Telecom İzmir Cup – Doubles =

Doubles
- 2013 Türk Telecom İzmir Cup

Final
- Champions: (United States) Austin Krajicek (United States) Tennys Sandgren
- Runners-up: (United Kingdom) Brydan Klein (Australia) Dane Propoggia
- Score: 7-6^{7-4}, 6-4

Events
Singles	Doubles
← 2012 ·	Türk Telecom İzmir Cup	· 2014 →

David Rice and Sean Thornley were the defending champions but lost in the first round.
Austin Krajicek and Tennys Sandgren defeated Brydan Klein and Dane Propoggia in the finals by a score 7-6^{7-4}, 6–4.

== Seeds ==
1. (United States) James Cerretani / (Canada) Adil Shamasdin (quarterfinals)
2. (United States) Austin Krajicek / (United States) Tennys Sandgren (champions)
3. (United Kingdom) Jamie Delgado / (Australia) Jordan Kerr (quarterfinals)
4. (United Kingdom) Brydan Klein / (Australia) Dane Propoggia (finals)

== Draw ==
=== Key ===
- Q = Qualifier
- WC = Wild card
- LL = Lucky loser
- Alt = Alternate
- SE = Special exempt
- PR = Protected ranking
- ITF = ITF entry
- JE = Junior exempt
- w/o = Walkover
- r = Retired
- d = Defaulted
- SR = Special ranking

=== Draw ===
First round

Quarterfinals

Semifinals

Final

1
(United States) J Cerretani
(Canada) A Shamasdin
6
6

WC
(Turkey) Berk Iliescu
(Turkey) Sefa Suluoglu
2
0

1
- (United States) J Cerretani
- (Canada) A Shamasdin
3
2

(Italy) F Cipolla
(Spain) A Menéndez Maceiras
6
6

(Italy) F Cipolla
(Spain) A Menéndez Maceiras
6
6

- (Republic of Ireland) J Cluskey
- (Austria) M Neuchrist
3
4

- (Italy) F Cipolla
- (Spain) A Menéndez Maceiras
5
5

4
(United Kingdom) B Klein
(Australia) D Propoggia
6
6

4
(United Kingdom) B Klein
(Australia) D Propoggia
7
7

WC
(Turkey) A Yüksel
(Turkey) Efe Yurtacan
3
3

4
(United Kingdom) B Klein
(Australia) D Propoggia
6
6

- (Republic of Ireland) J McGee
- (Belgium) Y Mertens
3
4

- (Tunisia) M Jaziri
- (Russia) A Lobkov
3
4

(Tunisia) M Jaziri
(Russia) A Lobkov
6
6

4
- (United Kingdom) B Klein
- (Australia) D Propoggia
6^{4}
4

(Belarus) U Ignatik
(Ukraine) I Marchenko
6
4
[12]

2
(United States) A Krajicek
(United States) T Sandgren
7^{7}
6

- (Finland) H Kontinen
- (Sweden) A Siljeström
2
6
[10]

(Belarus) U Ignatik
(Ukraine) I Marchenko
6
3
[10]

- (United Kingdom) D Rice
- (United Kingdom) S Thornley
3
4

3
- (United Kingdom) J Delgado
- (Australia) J Kerr
4
6
[6]

3
(United Kingdom) J Delgado
(Australia) J Kerr
6
6

- (Belarus) U Ignatik
- (Ukraine) I Marchenko
6^{6}
3

(Bosnia and Herzegovina) M Basic
(China) D Wu
6
6

2
(United States) A Krajicek
(United States) T Sandgren
7^{8}
6

- (Georgia (country)) N Basilashvili
- (Egypt) M Safwat
1
1

- (Bosnia and Herzegovina) M Basic
- (China) D Wu
1
5

- (Turkey) T Altuna
- (Turkey) B Ergüden
3
2

2
(United States) A Krajicek
(United States) T Sandgren
6
7

2
(United States) A Krajicek
(United States) T Sandgren
6
6
