= 2014 Türk Telecom İzmir Cup – Doubles =

Doubles
- 2014 Türk Telecom İzmir Cup

Final
- Champions: (United Kingdom) Ken Skupski (United Kingdom) Neal Skupski
- Runners-up: (Tunisia) Malek Jaziri (Russia) Alexander Kudryavtsev
- Score: 6–1, 6–4

Events
Singles	Doubles
← 2013 ·	Türk Telecom İzmir Cup	· 2015 →

Austin Krajicek and Tennys Sandgren were the current champions, but did not compete this year.

Ken and Neal Skupski won the title by defeating Malek Jaziri and Alexander Kudryavtsev 6–1, 6–4 in the final.

== Seeds ==
1. (United Kingdom) Ken Skupski / (United Kingdom) Neal Skupski (champions)
2. (Germany) Gero Kretschmer / (United States) Nicholas Monroe (semifinals)
3. (Belarus) Sergey Betov / (Belarus) Alexander Bury (first round)
4. (Russia) Victor Baluda / (Russia) Konstantin Kravchuk (quarterfinals)

== Draw ==
=== Key ===
- Q = Qualifier
- WC = Wild card
- LL = Lucky loser
- Alt = Alternate
- SE = Special exempt
- PR = Protected ranking
- ITF = ITF entry
- JE = Junior exempt
- w/o = Walkover
- r = Retired
- d = Defaulted
- SR = Special ranking

=== Draw ===
First round
1	(United Kingdom) K Skupski (United Kingdom) N Skupski	7^{8}	6
Alt	(Bosnia and Herzegovina) M Bašić (Bosnia and Herzegovina) T Brkić	6^{6}	2
(Croatia) B Ćorić (Croatia) A Pavić	6	1	[10]
WC	(Turkey) C İlkel (Turkey) Efe Yurtaçan	3	6	[8]
3	(Belarus) S Betov (Belarus) A Bury	4	6^{3}
(Australia) J Kerr (France) F Martin	6	7^{7}
Alt	(Russia) V Rudnev (Belarus) Y Shyla	w/o
(Serbia) F Krajinović (Serbia) G Tošić
(Tunisia) M Jaziri (Russia) A Kudryavtsev	6	6
(United States) J Cerretani (Germany) A Zverev	4	4
(India) P Raja (Sweden) A Siljeström	6	4	[8]
4	(Russia) V Baluda (Russia) K Kravchuk	4	6	[10]
WC	(Turkey) B Ergüden (Turkey) M İlhan	6^{4}	2
(Belarus) E Gerasimov (Spain) R Ortega Olmedo	7^{7}	6
WC	(Turkey) T Altuna (Bosnia and Herzegovina) A Šetkić	1	0
2	(Germany) G Kretschmer (United States) N Monroe	6	6

Quarterfinals
1	(United Kingdom) K Skupski (United Kingdom) N Skupski	6	3	[10]
(Croatia) B Ćorić (Croatia) A Pavić	3	6	[3]
(Australia) J Kerr (France) F Martin	4	6	[4]
Alt	(Russia) V Rudnev (Belarus) Y Shyla	6	3	[10]
(Tunisia) M Jaziri (Russia) A Kudryavtsev	3	6	[15]
4	(Russia) V Baluda (Russia) K Kravchuk	6	4	[13]
(Belarus) E Gerasimov (Spain) R Ortega-Olmedo	1	1
2	(Germany) G Kretschmer (United States) N Monroe	6	6

Semifinals
1	(United Kingdom) K Skupski (United Kingdom) N Skupski	5	6	[10]
(Russia) V Rudnev (Belarus) Y Shyla	7	2	[3]
(Tunisia) M Jaziri (Russia) A Kudryavtsev	3	6	[10]
2	(Germany) G Kretschmer (United States) N Monroe	6	2	[5]

Final
1	(United Kingdom) K Skupski (United Kingdom) N Skupski	6	6
(Tunisia) M Jaziri (Russia) A Kudryavtsev	1	4
