= 2009 Türk Telecom İzmir Cup – Doubles =

Doubles
- 2009 Türk Telecom İzmir Cup

Final
- Champions: (Israel) Jonathan Erlich (Israel) Harel Levy
- Runners-up: (India) Prakash Amritraj (United States) Rajeev Ram
- Score: 6–3, 6–3

Events
Singles	Doubles
- Türk Telecom İzmir Cup

Jesse Levine and Kei Nishikori were the defending champions. Levine chose to not play and Nishikori was injured.
Jonathan Erlich and Harel Levy became the new champions, after their won against Prakash Amritraj and Rajeev Ram in the final (6–3, 6–3).

== Seeds ==
1. (Israel) Jonathan Erlich / (Israel) Harel Levy (champions)
2. (India) Prakash Amritraj / (United States) Rajeev Ram (final)
3. (Russia) Michail Elgin / (Russia) Alexandre Kudryavtsev (semifinals)
4. (Ukraine) Sergei Bubka / (Ukraine) Sergiy Stakhovsky (semifinals)

== Draw ==
Key

- Q = Qualifier
- WC = Wild card
- LL = Lucky loser
- Alt = Alternate
- ITF = ITF entry
- PR = Protected ranking
- SR = Special ranking
- SE = Special exempt
- JE = Junior exempt
- JR = Junior Accelerator Programme entrant
- CO = College Accelerator Programme entrant
- NG = Next Gen Accelerator Program entrant
- w/o = Walkover
- r = Retired
- d = Defaulted

=== Draw ===
First round
1	(Israel) J Erlich (Israel) H Levy	6	6
(Australia) C Guccione (Australia) B Klein	4	4
ALT	(Ukraine) I Marchenko (Ukraine) I Sergeyev	6^{2}	7	[6]
(United Kingdom) J Auckland (United Kingdom) J Goodall	7	5	[10]
4	(Ukraine) S Bubka (Ukraine) S Stakhovsky	6	6
WC	(Turkey) M İlhan (Kazakhstan) A Kedryuk	3	4
(Germany) B Dorsch (Germany) M Kohlmann	6	6
(Italy) P Lorenzi (Sweden) B Rehnquist	2	1
(India) P Raja (Australia) J Sirianni	3	4
(Italy) A Stoppini (United States) T Widom	6	6
(United Kingdom) A Bogdanovic (United Kingdom) J Delgado	3	3
3	(Russia) M Elgin (Russia) A Kudryavtsev	6	6
(Turkey) H Akkoyun (Turkey) E Zorlu	3	6^{4}
(Denmark) F Nielsen (United Kingdom) K Skupski	6	7
WC	(Turkey) S Beceren (Turkey) B Ergüden	6^{3}	2
2	(India) P Amritraj (United States) R Ram	7	6

Quarterfinals
1	(Israel) J Erlich (Israel) H Levy	6	6
(United Kingdom) J Auckland (United Kingdom) J Goodall	2	3
4	(Ukraine) S Bubka (Ukraine) S Stakhovsky
(Germany) B Dorsch (Germany) M Kohlmann	w/o
(Italy) A Stoppini (United States) T Widom	1	3
3	(Russia) M Elgin (Russia) A Kudryavtsev	6	6
(Denmark) F Nielsen (United Kingdom) K Skupski	3	4
2	(India) P Amritraj (United States) R Ram	6	6

Semifinals
1	(Israel) J Erlich (Israel) H Levy	6	6
4	(Ukraine) S Bubka (Ukraine) S Stakhovsky	2	1
3	(Russia) M Elgin (Russia) A Kudryavtsev	6^{8}	6	[5]
2	(India) P Amritraj (United States) R Ram	7	1	[10]

Finals
1	(Israel) J Erlich (Israel) H Levy	6	6
2	(India) P Amritraj (United States) R Ram	3	3
