= 2014 Türk Telecom İzmir Cup =

- Date: 15–21 September
- Edition: 7th
- Surface: Hard
- Location: İzmir, Turkey

Champions

Singles
- (Croatia) Borna Ćorić

Doubles
- (United Kingdom) Ken Skupski / (United Kingdom) Neal Skupski
← 2013 ·	Türk Telecom İzmir Cup	· 2015 →

The 2014 Türk Telecom İzmir Cup was a professional tennis tournament played on hard courts. It was the seventh edition of the tournament which is part of the 2014 ATP Challenger Tour. It took place in İzmir, Turkey between 15 and 21 September 2014.

== Singles main-draw entrants ==
=== Seeds ===
Country	Player	Rank^{1}	Seed
TUN	Malek Jaziri	96	1
SRB	Filip Krajinović	107	2
RUS	Alexander Kudryavtsev	132	3
RUS	Evgeny Donskoy	135	4
CRO	Ante Pavić	138	5
TUR	Marsel İlhan	142	6
UKR	Illya Marchenko	148	7
GER	Alexander Zverev	150	8

- ^{1} Rankings are as of September 8, 2014.

=== Other entrants ===
The following players received wildcards into the singles main draw:

- (Turkey) Tuna Altuna
- (Turkey) Baris Erguden
- (Turkey) Cem Ilkel
- (Turkey) Efe Yurtaçan

The following player entered into the singles main draw as a protected ranking:

- (Germany) Philipp Petzschner

The following players received entry from the qualifying draw:

- (Russia) Victor Baluda
- (Russia) Mikhail Ledovskikh
- (Belarus) Yaraslav Shyla
- (South Africa) Tucker Vorster

== Champions ==
=== Singles ===
- (Croatia) Borna Ćorić def. (Tunisia) Malek Jaziri, 6–1, 6–7^{(7–9)}, 6–4

=== Doubles ===
- (United Kingdom) Ken Skupski / (United Kingdom) Neal Skupski vs. (Tunisia) Malek Jaziri / (Russia) Alexander Kudryavtsev, 6–1, 6–4
