= 2011 Türk Telecom İzmir Cup – Doubles =

Doubles
- 2011 Türk Telecom İzmir Cup

Final
- Champions: (United States) Travis Rettenmaier; (Germany) Simon Stadler
- Runners-up: (Italy) Flavio Cipolla; (Italy) Thomas Fabbiano
- Score: 6–0, 6–2

Events
Singles	Doubles
← 2010 ·	Türk Telecom İzmir Cup	· 2012 →

Rameez Junaid and Frank Moser were the defending champions, but decided not to participate.

Travis Rettenmaier and Simon Stadler won in the final 6–0, 6–2, against Flavio Cipolla and Thomas Fabbiano.

== Seeds ==
1. (Australia) Carsten Ball / (Denmark) Frederik Nielsen (first round)
2. (United States) Travis Rettenmaier / (Germany) Simon Stadler (champions)
3. (France) Romain Jouan / (France) Fabrice Martin (first round)
4. (Germany) Andre Begemann / (Tunisia) Malek Jaziri (semifinals)

== Draw ==
=== Key ===
- Q = Qualifier
- WC = Wild card
- LL = Lucky loser
- Alt = Alternate
- SE = Special exempt
- PR = Protected ranking
- ITF = ITF entry
- JE = Junior exempt
- w/o = Walkover
- r = Retired
- d = Defaulted
- SR = Special ranking

=== Draw ===
First round

Quarterfinals

Semifinals

Final

1
- (Australia) C Ball
- (Denmark) F Nielsen
6
3

- (Lithuania) R Berankis
- (Lithuania) L Grigelis
7
6

- (Lithuania) R Berankis
- (Lithuania) L Grigelis
6
6

WC
(Turkey) H Akkoyun
(Turkey) Anıl Yuksel
6^{5}
4

- (Turkey) T Altuna
- (South Africa) R Roelofse
3
4

- (Turkey) T Altuna
- (South Africa) R Roelofse
7^{7}
6

- (Lithuania) R Berankis
- (Lithuania) L Grigelis
1^{r}

3
- (France) R Jouan
- (France) F Martin
3
2

- (Italy) F Cipolla
- (Italy) T Fabbiano
4

- (United Kingdom) J Baker
- (Bulgaria) D Kutrovsky
6
6

- (United Kingdom) J Baker
- (Bulgaria) D Kutrovsky

WC
- (Turkey) B Erguden
- (Turkey) E Zorlu
0
1

- (Italy) F Cipolla
- (Italy) T Fabbiano
w/o

- (Italy) F Cipolla
- (Italy) T Fabbiano
6
6

- (Italy) F Cipolla
- (Italy) T Fabbiano
0
2

- (France) Charles-Antoine Brézac
- (France) O Charroin
4
7
[7]

2
- (United States) T Rettenmaier
- (Germany) S Stadler
6
6

(Canada) É Chvojka
(Russia) Ervand Gasparyan
6
5
[10]

(Canada) É Chvojka
(Russia) E Gasparyan
1
4

WC
(Turkey) Durukan Durmus
(Turkey) Efe Yurtacan
2
0

4
- (Germany) A Begemann
- (Tunisia) M Jaziri
6
6

4
- (Germany) A Begemann
- (Tunisia) M Jaziri
6
6

4
- (Germany) A Begemann
- (Tunisia) M Jaziri
0
7^{7}
[2]

- (Slovakia) L Lacko
- (Czech Republic) J Mertl
6
4
[6]

2
- (United States) T Rettenmaier
- (Germany) S Stadler
6
6^{3}
[10]

- (Republic of Ireland) J McGee
- (Egypt) M Safwat
2
6
[10]

- (Republic of Ireland) J McGee
- (Egypt) M Safwat
4
0

- (France) G Burquier
- (Belgium) Y Mertens
1
2

2
- (United States) T Rettenmaier
- (Germany) S Stadler
6
6

2
- (United States) T Rettenmaier
- (Germany) S Stadler
6
6
