= 2010 Türk Telecom İzmir Cup – Doubles =

Doubles
- 2010 Türk Telecom İzmir Cup

Final
- Champions: (Australia) Rameez Junaid; (Germany) Frank Moser
- Runners-up: (United Kingdom) Jamie Delgado; (United Kingdom) Jonathan Marray
- Score: 6–2, 6–4

Events
Singles	Doubles
← 2009 ·	Türk Telecom İzmir Cup	· 2011 →

Jonathan Erlich and Harel Levy were the defending champions, but they decided not to participate.
Rameez Junaid and Frank Moser defeated Jamie Delgado and Jonathan Marray 6–2, 6–4 in the final.

== Seeds ==
1. (United States) Brian Battistone / (Sweden) Andreas Siljeström (semifinals)
2. (United Kingdom) Jamie Delgado / (United Kingdom) Jonathan Marray (final)
3. (Philippines) Treat Conrad Huey / (United Kingdom) Dominic Inglot (semifinals)
4. (Australia) Rameez Junaid / (Germany) Frank Moser (champions)

== Draw ==
=== Key ===
- Q = Qualifier
- WC = Wild card
- LL = Lucky loser
- Alt = Alternate
- SE = Special exempt
- PR = Protected ranking
- ITF = ITF entry
- JE = Junior exempt
- w/o = Walkover
- r = Retired
- d = Defaulted
- SR = Special ranking

=== Draw ===
First round

Quarterfinals

Semifinals

Final

1
- (United States) B Battistone
- (Sweden) A Siljeström
6
6

- (Switzerland) Y Allegro
- (Switzerland) M Lammer
2
2

1
- (United States) B Battistone
- (Sweden) A Siljeström
7
6

- (Latvia) A Juška
- (Latvia) D Pavlovs
6
6

- (Latvia) A Juška
- (Latvia) D Pavlovs
6^{3}
3

- (Australia) J Lemke
- (Belgium) Y Mertens
0
4

1
- (United States) B Battistone
- (Sweden) A Siljeström
5
6^{2}

4
- (Australia) R Junaid
- (Germany) F Moser
6
6

4
- (Australia) R Junaid
- (Germany) F Moser
7
7

WC
- (Turkey) H Akkoyun
- (Switzerland) G Bastl
1
4

4
- (Australia) R Junaid
- (Germany) F Moser
6
6

- (Montenegro) G Tošić
- (Russia) M Vasiliev
2
4

- (Belarus) U Ignatik
- (Slovakia) M Kližan
3
2

- (Belarus) U Ignatik
- (Slovakia) M Kližan
6
6

4
- (Australia) R Junaid
- (Germany) F Moser
6
6

- (Greece) T Angelinos
- (India) S Devvarman
3
1

2
- (United Kingdom) J Delgado
- (United Kingdom) J Marray
2
4

- (Australia) S Kadir
- (India) P Raja
6
6

- (Australia) S Kadir
- (India) P Raja
6
3
[9]

- (Russia) M Elgin
- (Ukraine) A Smirnov
3
2

3
- (Philippines) TC Huey
- (United Kingdom) D Inglot
3
6
[11]

3
- (Philippines) TC Huey
- (United Kingdom) D Inglot
6
6

3
- (Philippines) TC Huey
- (United Kingdom) D Inglot
3
7
[3]

WC
- (Turkey) T Altuna
- (Australia) S Groth
6
6

2
- (United Kingdom) J Delgado
- (United Kingdom) J Marray
6
6^{5}
[10]

WC
- (Turkey) A Yuksel
- (Turkey) E Zorlu
3
4

WC
- (Turkey) T Altuna
- (Australia) S Groth
2
2

- (United Kingdom) J Baker
- (Italy) F Cipolla
3
3

2
- (United Kingdom) J Delgado
- (United Kingdom) J Marray
6
6

2
- (United Kingdom) J Delgado
- (United Kingdom) J Marray
6
6
