= 2012 Türk Telecom İzmir Cup – Singles =

Singles
- 2012 Türk Telecom İzmir Cup

Final
- Champion: (Russia) Dmitry Tursunov
- Runner-up: (Ukraine) Illya Marchenko
- Score: 7–6^{(7–4)}, 6–7^{(5–7)}, 6–3

Events
Singles	Doubles
← 2011 ·	Türk Telecom İzmir Cup	· 2013 →

Lukáš Lacko was the defending champion but decided not to participate.
Dmitry Tursunov won the title, defeating Illya Marchenko 7–6^{(7–4)}, 6–7^{(5–7)}, 6–3 in the final.

== Seeds ==
1. (Tunisia) Malek Jaziri (second round)
2. (United States) Michael Russell (quarterfinals)
3. (Canada) Frank Dancevic (first round)
4. (Slovakia) Karol Beck (semifinals)
5. (Russia) Dmitry Tursunov (champion)
6. (Russia) Igor Kunitsyn (first round, retired because of a lower back injury)
7. (United States) Denis Kudla (quarterfinals)
8. (Ukraine) Sergei Bubka (first round)

== Draw ==
=== Key ===
- Q = Qualifier
- WC = Wild card
- LL = Lucky loser
- Alt = Alternate
- SE = Special exempt
- PR = Protected ranking
- ITF = ITF entry
- JE = Junior exempt
- w/o = Walkover
- r = Retired
- d = Defaulted
- SR = Special ranking

=== Finals ===
Semifinals
(United States) Steve Johnson	4	3
(Ukraine) Illya Marchenko	6	6
4	(Slovakia) Karol Beck	4	3
5	(Russia) Dmitry Tursunov	6	6

Final
(Ukraine) Illya Marchenko	6^{4}	7^{7}	3
5	(Russia) Dmitry Tursunov	7^{7}	6^{5}	6

=== Top half ===
First round
1	(Tunisia) M Jaziri	6	4
(Australia) B Klein	2	1^{r}
(Russia) K Kravchuk	3	2
(United States) S Johnson	6	6
(United Kingdom) J Baker	6	6
WC	(Turkey) H Akkoyun	1	0
WC	(Turkey) D Durmus	0	1
7	(United States) D Kudla	6	6
3	(Canada) F Dancevic	4	6^{4}
(Ukraine) I Marchenko	6	7^{7}
Q	(South Africa) R Roelofse	6^{9}	3
(Canada) É Chvojka	7^{11}	6
Q	(Republic of Ireland) J McGee	6	6
(Moldova) R Albot	2	4
(Romania) M Copil	6	3
6	(Russia) I Kunitsyn	1	0^{r}

Second round
1	(Tunisia) M Jaziri	3	7	4
(United States) S Johnson	6	5	6
(United Kingdom) J Baker	7	3	1^{r}
7	(United States) D Kudla	5	6	3
(Ukraine) I Marchenko	6	7^{8}
(Canada) É Chvojka	2	6^{6}
Q	(Republic of Ireland) J McGee	6	7^{9}
(Romania) M Copil	3	6^{7}

Quarterfinals
(United States) S Johnson	6	5	6
7	(United States) D Kudla	3	7	4
(Ukraine) I Marchenko	6	7
Q	(Republic of Ireland) J McGee	3	5

Semifinals
(United States) S Johnson	4	3
(Ukraine) I Marchenko	6	6

=== Bottom half ===
First round
8	(Ukraine) S Bubka	6	0	4
(Belarus) U Ignatik	3	6	6
(Turkey) M İlhan	6	6
SE	(Bosnia and Herzegovina) T Brkić	2	3
WC	(Turkey) Efe Yurtacan	1	2
(United Kingdom) J Goodall	6	6
WC	(Turkey) T Altuna	4	4
4	(Slovakia) K Beck	6	6
5	(Russia) D Tursunov	6	6
LL	(Moldova) R Borvanov	4	3
Q	(Italy) L Vanni	4	2
(Netherlands) M Middelkoop	6	6
(India) V Vardhan	6	6
(South Africa) I van der Merwe	4	2
Q	(Bosnia and Herzegovina) M Bašić	2	6^{5}
2	(United States) M Russell	6	7^{7}

Second round
(Belarus) U Ignatik	3	6^{4}
(Turkey) M İlhan	6	7^{7}
(United Kingdom) J Goodall	2	1
4	(Slovakia) K Beck	6	6
5	(Russia) D Tursunov	7^{8}	6
(Netherlands) M Middelkoop	6^{6}	2
(India) V Vardhan	6^{4}	1
2	(United States) M Russell	7^{7}	6

Quarterfinals
(Turkey) M İlhan	5	3
4	(Slovakia) K Beck	7	6
5	(Russia) D Tursunov	6	7^{7}
2	(United States) M Russell	3	6^{5}

Semifinals
4	(Slovakia) K Beck	4	3
5	(Russia) D Tursunov	6	6
