= 2013 Türk Telecom İzmir Cup =

- Date: 16–22 September
- Edition: 6th
- Surface: Hard
- Location: İzmir, Turkey

Champions

Singles
- (Kazakhstan) Mikhail Kukushkin

Doubles
- (United States) Austin Krajicek / (United States) Tennys Sandgren
← 2012 ·	Türk Telecom İzmir Cup	· 2014 →

The 2013 Türk Telecom İzmir Cup was a professional tennis tournament played on hard courts. It was the sixth edition of the tournament which was part of the 2013 ATP Challenger Tour. It took place in İzmir, Turkey between 16 and 22 September 2013.

== Singles main-draw entrants ==
=== Seeds ===
Country	Player	Rank^{1}	Seed
KAZ	Mikhail Kukushkin	145	1
UKR	Illya Marchenko	148	2
GER	Peter Gojowczyk	150	3
TUR	Marsel İlhan	173	4
TUN	Malek Jaziri	177	5
ESP	Adrián Menéndez Maceiras	178	6
BLR	Uladzimir Ignatik	181	7
ITA	Flavio Cipolla	183	8

- ^{1} Rankings are as of September 9, 2013.

=== Other entrants ===
The following players received wildcards into the singles main draw:

- (Turkey) Tuna Altuna
- (Turkey) Barış Ergüden
- (Turkey) Anıl Yüksel
- (Turkey) Efe Yurtacan

The following players received entry from the qualifying draw:

- (Spain) Andrés Artuñedo Martínavarr
- (Romania) Teodor-Dacian Crăciun
- (United Kingdom) David Rice
- (Republic of Ireland) Louk Sorensen

== Champions ==
=== Singles ===
- (Kazakhstan) Mikhail Kukushkin def. (Republic of Ireland) Louk Sorensen 6–1, 6–4

=== Doubles ===
- (United States) Austin Krajicek / (United States) Tennys Sandgren def. (United Kingdom) Brydan Klein / (Australia) Dane Propoggia 7–6^{(7–4)}, 6–4
