= 2011 Türk Telecom İzmir Cup – Singles =

Singles
- 2011 Türk Telecom İzmir Cup

Final
- Champion: (Slovakia) Lukáš Lacko
- Runner-up: (Turkey) Marsel İlhan
- Score: 6–4, 6–3

Events
Singles	Doubles
← 2010 ·	Türk Telecom İzmir Cup	· 2012 →

Somdev Devvarman was the defending champion but decided not to participate.

5th seed Lukáš Lacko won the title, defeating 1st seed Marsel İlhan 6–4, 6–3 in the final.

== Seeds ==
1. (Turkey) Marsel İlhan (final)
2. (Belgium) Steve Darcis (semifinals)
3. (Italy) Flavio Cipolla (semifinals)
4. (Belgium) Ruben Bemelmans (second round)
5. (Slovakia) Lukáš Lacko (champion)
6. (Tunisia) Malek Jaziri (first round)
7. (Lithuania) Ričardas Berankis (quarterfinals)
8. (Ukraine) Sergei Bubka (quarterfinals)

== Draw ==
=== Key ===
- Q = Qualifier
- WC = Wild card
- LL = Lucky loser
- Alt = Alternate
- SE = Special exempt
- PR = Protected ranking
- ITF = ITF entry
- JE = Junior exempt
- w/o = Walkover
- r = Retired
- d = Defaulted
- SR = Special ranking

=== Finals ===
Semifinals
1	(Turkey) Marsel İlhan	6	6
3	(Italy) Flavio Cipolla	3	4
5	(Slovakia) Lukáš Lacko	6	6
2	(Belgium) Steve Darcis	2	2

Final
1	(Turkey) Marsel İlhan	4	3
5	(Slovakia) Lukáš Lacko	6	6

=== Top half ===
First round
1	(Turkey) M İlhan	6	6
WC	(Turkey) Muhammet Haylaz	1	0
LL	(Bulgaria) D Kutrovsky	6	6
WC	(Turkey) Durukan Durmus	1	1
(Bosnia and Herzegovina) A Delić	4	6	1
(Lithuania) L Grigelis	6	3	6
(Germany) A Begemann	6	4	6
6	(Tunisia) M Jaziri	4	6	4
3	(Italy) F Cipolla	6	6
(France) R Jouan	0	4
(France) F Martin	1^{r}
Q	(Germany) S Stadler	4
Q	(Russia) Ervand Gasparyan	2	6	6^{3}
(Canada) É Chvojka	6	3	7^{7}
(Belgium) Y Mertens	3	4
8	(Ukraine) S Bubka	6	6

Second round
1	(Turkey) M İlhan	7	6
LL	(Bulgaria) D Kutrovsky	5	1
(Lithuania) L Grigelis	6	7
(Germany) A Begemann	2	5
3	(Italy) F Cipolla	6	6
Q	(Germany) S Stadler	4	1
(Canada) É Chvojka	0	1
8	(Ukraine) S Bubka	6	6

Quarterfinals
1	(Turkey) M İlhan	6	6
(Lithuania) L Grigelis	4	0
3	(Italy) F Cipolla	6	6
8	(Ukraine) S Bubka	4	1

Semifinals
1	(Turkey) M İlhan	6	6
3	(Italy) F Cipolla	3	4

=== Bottom half ===
First round
5	(Slovakia) L Lacko	5	6	7
(Russia) M Ledovskikh	7	3	5
(Czech Republic) J Mertl	7^{7}	6
(United Kingdom) J Baker	6^{5}	3
Q	(Egypt) M Safwat	4	6	6^{2}
(France) Charles-Antoine Brézac	6	2	7^{7}
WC	(Turkey) Efe Yurtacan	0	2
4	(Belgium) R Bemelmans	6	6
7	(Lithuania) R Berankis	7	6
(Denmark) F Nielsen	5	0
Q	(Republic of Ireland) J McGee	2	2
(Italy) T Fabbiano	6	6
WC	(Turkey) H Akkoyun	2	3
(Australia) C Ball	6	6
(France) G Burquier	6	2	5
2	(Belgium) S Darcis	0	6	7

Second round
5	(Slovakia) L Lacko	6	6
(Czech Republic) J Mertl	2	3
(France) C-A Brézac	3	6	6
4	(Belgium) R Bemelmans	6	4	2
7	(Lithuania) R Berankis	6	7
(Italy) T Fabbiano	3	6^{3}
(Australia) C Ball	3	6^{5}
2	(Belgium) S Darcis	6	7

Quarterfinals
5	(Slovakia) L Lacko	6	6
(France) C-A Brézac	1	3
7	(Lithuania) R Berankis	7	5	4
2	(Belgium) S Darcis	5	7	6

Semifinals
5	(Slovakia) L Lacko	6	6
2	(Belgium) S Darcis	2	2
