= 2015 Türk Telecom İzmir Cup =

- Date: 21–27 September
- Edition: 8th
- Surface: Hard
- Location: İzmir, Turkey

Champions

Singles
- (Slovakia) Lukáš Lacko

Doubles
- (India) Saketh Myneni / (India) Divij Sharan
← 2014 ·	Türk Telecom İzmir Cup	· 2016 →

The 2015 Türk Telecom İzmir Cup was a professional tennis tournament played on hard courts. It was the eighth edition of the tournament which is part of the 2015 ATP Challenger Tour. It took place in İzmir, Turkey between 21 and 27 September 2015.

== Singles main-draw entrants ==
=== Seeds ===
Country	Player	Rank^{1}	Seed
TUR	Marsel İlhan	80	1
TUN	Malek Jaziri	82	2
RUS	~~Andrey Kuznetsov~~	~~97~~	3
SVK	Lukáš Lacko	114	4
ESP	~~Adrián Menéndez Maceiras~~	~~131~~	5
SWE	Elias Ymer	132	6
BIH	Mirza Bašić	147	7
UZB	Farrukh Dustov	158	8

- ^{1} Rankings are as of September 14, 2015.

=== Other entrants ===
The following players received wildcards into the singles main draw:

- (Turkey) Sarp Ağabigün
- (Turkey) Altuğ Çelikbilek
- (Turkey) Barış Ergüden
- (Turkey) Barkın Yalçınkale

The following player entered into the singles main draw as a protected ranking:

- (Switzerland) Marco Chiudinelli

The following players received entry from the qualifying draw:

- (Cyprus) Petros Chrysochos
- (Belarus) Ilya Ivashka
- (Germany) Daniel Masur
- (Georgia (country)) Aleksandre Metreveli

The following players received entry as a lucky loser:

- (Czech Republic) Michal Konečný
- (Austria) Maximilian Neuchrist
- (Belarus) Andrei Vasilevski

== Champions ==
=== Singles ===
- (Slovakia) Lukáš Lacko def. (Romania) Marius Copil, 6–3, 7–6^{(7–5)}

=== Doubles ===
- (India) Saketh Myneni / (India) Divij Sharan vs. (Tunisia) Malek Jaziri / (Ukraine) Denys Molchanov, 7–6^{(7–5)}, 4–6, 0–0 retired
