= 2015 Türk Telecom İzmir Cup – Doubles =

Doubles
- 2015 Türk Telecom İzmir Cup

Final
- Champions: (India) Saketh Myneni (India) Divij Sharan
- Runners-up: (Tunisia) Malek Jaziri (Ukraine) Denys Molchanov
- Score: 7–6^{(7–5)}, 4–6, 0–0 retired

Events
Singles	Doubles
← 2014 ·	Türk Telecom İzmir Cup	· 2016 →

Ken Skupski and Neal Skupski were the defending champions, but decided not to defend their title. Third seeds Saketh Myneni and Divij Sharan won the title defeating Malek Jaziri and Denys Molchanov 7–6^{(7–5)}, 4–6, 0–0 retired in the final.

== Seeds ==
1. (Germany) Gero Kretschmer / (Germany) Alexander Satschko (semifinals)
2. (Lithuania) Laurynas Grigelis / (Sweden) Andreas Siljeström (first round)
3. (India) Saketh Myneni / (India) Divij Sharan (champions)
4. (Tunisia) Malek Jaziri / (Ukraine) Denys Molchanov (final)

== Draw ==
=== Key ===
- Q = Qualifier
- WC = Wild card
- LL = Lucky loser
- Alt = Alternate
- SE = Special exempt
- PR = Protected ranking
- ITF = ITF entry
- JE = Junior exempt
- w/o = Walkover
- r = Retired
- d = Defaulted
- SR = Special ranking

First round
1	(Germany) G Kretschmer (Germany) A Satschko	6	6
(Romania) P Grigoriu (United Kingdom) D Rice	3	4
(Bosnia and Herzegovina) M Bašić (Austria) M Neuchrist	3	6	[2]
(Russia) A Karatsev (Belarus) A Vasilevski	6	2	[10]
3	(India) S Myneni (India) D Sharan	6	6
(Turkey) T Altuna (India) R Ramanathan	3	4
(India) F Dustov (Italy) Matteo Volante	6	6
Alt	(Czech Republic) Michal Konecny (Croatia) M Pecotić	4	1
WC	(Turkey) S Ağabigün (Turkey) A Çelikbilek	6	6
(Turkey) Barkin Yalcinkale (Turkey) Efe Yurtacan	4	3
(Uruguay) A Behar (Philippines) R Gonzales	2	1
4	(Tunisia) M Jaziri (Ukraine) D Molchanov	6	6
WC	(Turkey) B Ergüden (Turkey) C İlkel	1	2
(Serbia) Ivan Bjelica (Italy) Erik Crepaldi	6	6
(Belarus) I Ivashka (Russia) A Zaitcev	4	7^{7}	[10]
2	(Lithuania) L Grigelis (Sweden) L Siljeström	6	6^{3}	[6]

Quarterfinals
1	(Germany) G Kretschmer (Germany) A Satschko	6	7^{7}
(Russia) A Karatsev (Belarus) A Vasilevski	3	6^{3}
3	(India) S Myneni (India) D Sharan	7	6
(India) F Dustov (Italy) M Volante	5	1
WC	(Turkey) S Ağabigün (Turkey) A Çelikbilek	5	4
4	(Tunisia) M Jaziri (Ukraine) D Molchanov	7	6
(Serbia) I Bjelica (Italy) E Crepaldi	1
(Belarus) I Ivashka (Russia) A Zaitcev	2^{r}

Semifinals
1	(Germany) G Kretschmer (Germany) A Satschko	3	6	[9]
3	(India) S Myneni (India) D Sharan	6	3	[11]
4	(Tunisia) M Jaziri (Ukraine) D Molchanov	7^{11}	7^{10}
(Serbia) I Bjelica (Italy) E Crepaldi	6^{9}	6^{8}

Final
3	(India) S Myneni (India) D Sharan	7^{7}	4	0
4	(Tunisia) M Jaziri (Ukraine) D Molchanov	6^{5}	6	0^{r}
