= 2011 Türk Telecom İzmir Cup =

- Date: 19–25 September
- Edition: 4th
- Location: İzmir, Turkey

Champions

Singles
- (Slovakia) Lukáš Lacko

Doubles
- (United States) Travis Rettenmaier / (Germany) Simon Stadler
← 2010 ·	Türk Telecom İzmir Cup	· 2012 →

The 2011 Türk Telecom İzmir Cup was a professional tennis tournament played on hard courts. It was the fourth edition of the tournament which was part of the 2011 ATP Challenger Tour. It took place in İzmir, Turkey between 19 and 25 September 2011.

== ATP entrants ==
=== Seeds ===
Country	Player	Rank^{1}	Seed
TUR	Marsel İlhan	89	1
BEL	Steve Darcis	93	2
ITA	Flavio Cipolla	102	3
BEL	Ruben Bemelmans	148	4
SVK	Lukáš Lacko	151	5
TUN	Malek Jaziri	154	6
LTU	Ričardas Berankis	157	7
UKR	Sergey Bubka	166	8

- ^{1} Rankings are as of September 12, 2011.

=== Other entrants ===
The following players received wildcards into the singles main draw:

- (Turkey) Haluk Akkoyun
- (Turkey) Durukan Durmus
- (Turkey) Muhammet Haylaz
- (Turkey) Efe Yurtacan

The following players received entry from the qualifying draw:

- (Russia) Ervand Gasparyan
- (Republic of Ireland) James McGee
- (Egypt) Mohamed Safwat
- (Germany) Simon Stadler

The following players received entry as a lucky loser into the singles main draw:

- (Bulgaria) Dimitar Kutrovsky

== Champions ==
=== Singles ===
(Slovakia) Lukáš Lacko def. (Turkey) Marsel İlhan, 6–4, 6–3

=== Doubles ===
(United States) Travis Rettenmaier / (Germany) Simon Stadler def. (Italy) Flavio Cipolla / (Italy) Thomas Fabbiano, 6–0, 6–2
