= 2016 Türk Telecom İzmir Cup =

- Date: 19–25 September
- Edition: 9th
- Surface: Hard
- Location: İzmir, Turkey

Champions

Singles
- (Turkey) Marsel İlhan

Doubles
- (Switzerland) Marco Chiudinelli / (Romania) Marius Copil
← 2015 ·	Türk Telecom İzmir Cup	· 2017 →

The 2016 Türk Telecom İzmir Cup was a professional tennis tournament played on hard courts. It was the ninth edition of the tournament which is part of the 2016 ATP Challenger Tour. It took place in İzmir, Turkey between 19 and 25 September 2016.

== Singles main-draw entrants ==
=== Seeds ===
Country	Player	Rank^{1}	Seed
SVK	Lukáš Lacko	102	1
SUI	Marco Chiudinelli	132	2
BIH	Mirza Bašić	154	3
BEL	Kimmer Coppejans	157	4
BLR	Ilya Ivashka	167	5
ROU	Marius Copil	176	6
ESP	Adrián Menéndez Maceiras	213	7
UKR	Aleksandr Nedovyesov	215	8

- ^{1} Rankings are as of September 12, 2016.

=== Other entrants ===
The following players received wildcards into the singles main draw:

- (Turkey) Anıl Yüksel
- (Turkey) Cem İlkel
- (Turkey) Muhammet Haylaz
- (Turkey) Altuğ Çelikbilek

The following players received entry from the qualifying draw:

- (Netherlands) Tallon Griekspoor
- (Ukraine) Vladyslav Manafov
- (Netherlands) Kevin Griekspoor
- (Russia) Vitaly Kozyukov

== Champions ==
=== Singles ===
- (Turkey) Marsel İlhan def. (Turkey) Cem İlkel, 6–2, 6–4.

=== Doubles ===
- (Switzerland) Marco Chiudinelli / (Romania) Marius Copil def. (France) Sadio Doumbia / (France) Calvin Hemery, 6–4, 6–4.
