= 2012 Türk Telecom İzmir Cup – Doubles =

Doubles
- 2012 Türk Telecom İzmir Cup

Final
- Champions: (United Kingdom) David Rice; (United Kingdom) Sean Thornley
- Runners-up: (Australia) Brydan Klein; (Australia) Dane Propoggia
- Score: 7–6^{(10–8)}, 6–2

Events
Singles	Doubles
← 2011 ·	Türk Telecom İzmir Cup	· 2013 →

Travis Rettenmaier and Simon Stadler were the defending champions but decided not to participate.
David Rice and Sean Thornley defeated Brydan Klein and Dane Propoggia 7–6^{(10–8)}, 6–2 in the final to win the title.

== Seeds ==
1. (Russia) Konstantin Kravchuk / (Ukraine) Denys Molchanov (first round)
2. (India) Divij Sharan / (India) Vishnu Vardhan (quarterfinals)
3. (Australia) Brydan Klein / (Australia) Dane Propoggia (final)
4. (Moldova) Radu Albot / (Belarus) Uladzimir Ignatik (first round)

== Draw ==
=== Key ===
- Q = Qualifier
- WC = Wild card
- LL = Lucky loser
- Alt = Alternate
- SE = Special exempt
- PR = Protected ranking
- ITF = ITF entry
- JE = Junior exempt
- w/o = Walkover
- r = Retired
- d = Defaulted
- SR = Special ranking

=== Draw ===
First round

Quarterfinals

Semifinals

Final

1
- (Russia) K Kravchuk
- (Ukraine) D Molchanov
3
2

- (United States) D Courtney
- (India) P Raja
6
6

- (United States) D Courtney
- (India) P Raja
6
7^{7}

- (South Africa) Ruan Roelofse
- (South Africa) I van der Merwe
1
4

Alt
- (Moldova) R Borvanov
- (New Zealand) A Sitak
4
6^{4}

Alt
- (Moldova) R Borvanov
- (New Zealand) A Sitak
6
6

- (United States) D Courtney
- (India) P Raja
6^{5}
4

3
- (Australia) B Klein
- (Australia) D Propoggia
6
6

3
- (Australia) B Klein
- (Australia) D Propoggia
7^{7}
6

WC
(Turkey) D Durmus
(Turkey) Efe Yurtacan
2
1

3
- (Australia) B Klein
- (Australia) D Propoggia
6
6

WC
- (Turkey) H Akkoyun
- (Turkey) E Zorlu
7^{7}
3
[10]

WC
- (Turkey) H Akkoyun
- (Turkey) E Zorlu
4
3

WC
(Turkey) T Altuna
(South Africa) Jean Andersen
6^{4}
6
[6]

3
- (Australia) B Klein
- (Australia) D Propoggia
6^{8}
2

- (United Kingdom) J Baker
- (Canada) É Chvojka
3
6
[4]

- (United Kingdom) D Rice
- (United Kingdom) S Thornley
7^{10}
6

- (Romania) M Copil
- (Romania) A Dăescu
6
3
[10]

- (Romania) M Copil
- (Romania) A Dăescu
6
4
[12]

- (Republic of Ireland) James Cluskey
- (Netherlands) M Middelkoop
7^{7}
6

- (Republic of Ireland) J Cluskey
- (Netherlands) M Middelkoop
4
6
[14]

4
- (Moldova) R Albot
- (Belarus) U Ignatik
6^{4}
4

- (Republic of Ireland) J Cluskey
- (Netherlands) M Middelkoop
6
3
[8]

- (United Kingdom) Lewis Burton
- (United Kingdom) J Goodall
6
2
[11]

- (United Kingdom) D Rice
- (United Kingdom) S Thornley
3
6
[10]

- (United Kingdom) D Rice
- (United Kingdom) S Thornley
3
6
[13]

- (United Kingdom) D Rice
- (United Kingdom) S Thornley
6
3
[10]

- (Russia) D Matsukevich
- (Russia) D Tursunov
4
6^{3}

2
- (India) D Sharan
- (India) V Vardhan
0
6
[8]

2
- (India) D Sharan
- (India) V Vardhan
6
7^{7}
