= 2012 Türk Telecom İzmir Cup =

- Date: 17–23 September
- Edition: 5th
- Surface: Hard
- Location: İzmir, Turkey

Champions

Singles
- (Russia) Dmitry Tursunov

Doubles
- (United Kingdom) David Rice / (United Kingdom) Sean Thornley
← 2011 ·	Türk Telecom İzmir Cup	· 2013 →

The 2012 Türk Telecom İzmir Cup was a professional tennis tournament played on hard courts. It was the fifth edition of the tournament which was part of the 2012 ATP Challenger Tour. It took place in İzmir, Turkey between 17 and 23 September 2012.

== Singles main-draw entrants ==
=== Seeds ===
Country	Player	Rank^{1}	Seed
TUN	Malek Jaziri	104	1
USA	Michael Russell	105	2
CAN	Frank Dancevic	130	3
SVK	Karol Beck	134	4
RUS	Dmitry Tursunov	147	5
RUS	Igor Kunitsyn	151	6
USA	Denis Kudla	165	7
UKR	Sergei Bubka	174	8

- ^{1} Rankings are as of September 10, 2012.

=== Other entrants ===
The following players received wildcards into the singles main draw:

- (Turkey) Haluk Akkoyun
- (Turkey) Tuna Altuna
- (Turkey) Durukan Durmus
- (Turkey) Efe Yurtacan

The following players received a special exempt into the singles main draw:

- (Bosnia and Herzegovina) Tomislav Brkić

The following players received entry from the qualifying draw:

- (Bosnia and Herzegovina) Mirza Bašić
- (Republic of Ireland) James McGee
- (South Africa) Ruan Roelofse
- (Italy) Luca Vanni

The following players received entry into the singles main draw as a lucky loser:

- (Moldova) Roman Borvanov

== Champions ==
=== Singles ===
- (Russia) Dmitry Tursunov def. (Ukraine) Illya Marchenko, 7–6^{(7–4)}, 6–7^{(5–7)}, 6–3

=== Doubles ===
- (United Kingdom) David Rice / (United Kingdom) Sean Thornley def. (Australia) Brydan Klein / (Australia) Dane Propoggia, 7–6^{(10–8)}, 6–2
