= 2017 Türk Telecom İzmir Cup – Doubles =

Doubles
- 2017 Türk Telecom İzmir Cup

Final
- Champions: (United Kingdom) Scott Clayton (United Kingdom) Jonny O'Mara
- Runners-up: (Ukraine) Denys Molchanov (Ukraine) Sergiy Stakhovsky
- Score: Walkover

Events
Singles	Doubles
← 2016 ·	Türk Telecom İzmir Cup	· 2018 →

Marco Chiudinelli and Marius Copil were the defending champions but chose not to defend their title.

Scott Clayton and Jonny O'Mara won the title after Denys Molchanov and Sergiy Stakhovsky withdrew from the final.

== Seeds ==
1. (Ukraine) Denys Molchanov / (Ukraine) Sergiy Stakhovsky (final, withdrew)
2. (Switzerland) Luca Margaroli / (Austria) Lucas Miedler (semifinals)
3. (United Kingdom) Scott Clayton / (United Kingdom) Jonny O'Mara (champions)
4. (France) Benjamin Bonzi / (France) Yannick Jankovits (semifinals)

== Draw ==
=== Key ===
- Q = Qualifier
- WC = Wild card
- LL = Lucky loser
- Alt = Alternate
- SE = Special exempt
- PR = Protected ranking
- ITF = ITF entry
- JE = Junior exempt
- w/o = Walkover
- r = Retired
- d = Defaulted
- SR = Special ranking

First round
WC	(Turkey) Y Erel (Turkey) A Yüksel	2	3
WC	(Turkey) C İlkel (Turkey) MN Türker	6	6
4	(France) B Bonzi (France) Y Jankovits	6	6
WC	(Turkey) Muhammet Haylaz (Turkey) Sefa Suluoğlu	1	3
(France) M Janvier (France) S Robert	4	3
(Turkey) S Ağabigün (Turkey) A Çelikbilek	6	6
(Brazil) Caio Silva (Brazil) T Turini	6	2	[10]
(Czech Republic) Marek Jaloviec (Netherlands) M Vervoort	3	6	[7]
(Serbia) N Milojević (Bosnia and Herzegovina) A Šetkić	2	3
3	(United Kingdom) S Clayton (United Kingdom) J O'Mara	6	6
(Turkey) T Altuna (Serbia) D Petrović	4	4
(Germany) R Kern (Germany) Marc Sieber	6	6
(Kazakhstan) A Nedovyesov (Kazakhstan) D Popko	3	4
2	(Switzerland) L Margaroli (Austria) L Miedler	6	6

Quarterfinals
1	(Ukraine) D Molchanov (Ukraine) S Stakhovsky	6	6
WC	(Turkey) C İlkel (Turkey) MN Türker	3	2
4	(France) B Bonzi (France) Y Jankovits	4	6	[10]
(Turkey) S Ağabigün (Turkey) A Çelikbilek	6	3	[5]
(Brazil) C Silva (Brazil) T Turini	6^{5}	4
3	(United Kingdom) S Clayton (United Kingdom) J O'Mara	7^{7}	6
(Germany) R Kern (Germany) M Sieber	7	4	[7]
2	(Switzerland) L Margaroli (Austria) L Miedler	5	6	[10]

Semifinals
1	(Ukraine) D Molchanov (Ukraine) S Stakhovsky	6	3	[10]
4	(France) B Bonzi (France) Y Jankovits	4	6	[6]
3	(United Kingdom) S Clayton (United Kingdom) J O'Mara	6	7^{7}
2	(Switzerland) L Margaroli (Austria) L Miedler	4	6^{4}

Final
1	(Ukraine) D Molchanov (Ukraine) S Stakhovsky
3	(United Kingdom) S Clayton (United Kingdom) J O'Mara	w/o
