= 2016 Türk Telecom İzmir Cup – Doubles =

Doubles
- 2016 Türk Telecom İzmir Cup

Final
- Champions: (Switzerland) Marco Chiudinelli (Romania) Marius Copil
- Runners-up: (France) Sadio Doumbia (France) Calvin Hemery
- Score: 6–4, 6–4

Events
Singles	Doubles
← 2015 ·	Türk Telecom İzmir Cup	· 2017 →

Saketh Myneni and Divij Sharan were the defending champions but chose not to defend their title.

Marco Chiudinelli and Marius Copil won the title after defeating Sadio Doumbia and Calvin Hemery 6–4, 6–4 in the final.

== Seeds ==
1. (South Africa) Dean O'Brien / (South Africa) Ruan Roelofse (first round)
2. (Croatia) Ivan Sabanov / (Croatia) Matej Sabanov (first round)
3. (Belarus) Ilya Ivashka / (Belarus) Andrei Vasilevski (first round)
4. (Russia) Alexandr Igoshin / (Russia) Yan Sabanin (first round)

== Draw ==
=== Key ===
- Q = Qualifier
- WC = Wild card
- LL = Lucky loser
- Alt = Alternate
- SE = Special exempt
- PR = Protected ranking
- ITF = ITF entry
- JE = Junior exempt
- w/o = Walkover
- r = Retired
- d = Defaulted
- SR = Special ranking

First round
1	(South Africa) D O'Brien (South Africa) R Roelofse	6^{3}	3
(Germany) Y Hanfmann (Germany) Marc Sieber	7^{7}	6
WC	(Slovakia) F Horanský (Turkey) Sefa Suluoğlu	5	6^{4}
(France) S Doumbia (France) C Hemery	7	7^{7}
4	(Russia) Alexandr Igoshin (Russia) Yan Sabanin	6	4	[9]
(Czech Republic) Marek Jaloviec (Czech Republic) Michal Konečný	4	6	[11]
(Turkey) S Ağabigün (Turkey) A Çelikbilek	6	7
(Turkey) T Altuna (Turkey) C İlkel	3	5
(United States) JP Fruttero (Spain) A Menéndez Maceiras	6	6
WC	(Turkey) Muhammet Haylaz (Turkey) A Yüksel	0	3
(Switzerland) M Chiudinelli (Romania) M Copil	6	7^{7}
3	(Belarus) I Ivashka (Belarus) A Vasilevski	3	6^{4}
(Serbia) N Milojević (Bosnia and Herzegovina) A Šetkić	4	6^{9}
(Ukraine) V Manafov (Greece) S Tsitsipas	6	7^{11}
(Bosnia and Herzegovina) M Bašić (Bosnia and Herzegovina) T Brkić	7	6
2	(Croatia) I Sabanov (Croatia) M Sabanov	5	2

Quarterfinals
(Germany) Y Hanfmann (Germany) M Sieber	3	6	[8]
(France) S Doumbia (France) C Hemery	6	0	[10]
(Czech Republic) M Jaloviec (Czech Republic) M Konečný	6	6
(Turkey) S Ağabigün (Turkey) A Çelikbilek	0	3
(United States) JP Fruttero (Spain) A Menéndez Maceiras	7^{7}	4	[5]
(Switzerland) M Chiudinelli (Romania) M Copil	6^{3}	6	[10]
(Ukraine) V Manafov (Greece) S Tsitsipas	6	0	[10]
(Bosnia and Herzegovina) M Bašić (Bosnia and Herzegovina) T Brkić	3	6	[8]

Semifinals
(France) S Doumbia (France) C Hemery	6	6
(Czech Republic) M Jaloviec (Czech Republic) M Konečný	2	1
(Switzerland) M Chiudinelli (Romania) M Copil	6	6
(Ukraine) V Manafov (Greece) S Tsitsipas	2	4

Final
(France) S Doumbia (France) C Hemery	4	4
(Switzerland) M Chiudinelli (Romania) M Copil	6	6
