= 2016 Türk Telecom İzmir Cup – Singles =

Singles
- 2016 Türk Telecom İzmir Cup

Final
- Champion: (Turkey) Marsel İlhan
- Runner-up: (Turkey) Cem İlkel
- Score: 6–2, 6–4

Events
Singles	Doubles
← 2015 ·	Türk Telecom İzmir Cup	· 2017 →

Lukáš Lacko was the defending champion but lost in the quarterfinals to Cem İlkel.

Marsel İlhan won the title after defeating İlkel 6–2, 6–4 in the final.

== Seeds ==
1. (Slovakia) Lukáš Lacko (quarterfinals)
2. (Switzerland) Marco Chiudinelli (first round)
3. (Bosnia and Herzegovina) Mirza Bašić (semifinals)
4. (Belgium) Kimmer Coppejans (quarterfinals)
5. (Belarus) Ilya Ivashka (quarterfinals)
6. (Romania) Marius Copil (quarterfinals)
7. (Spain) Adrián Menéndez-Maceiras (first round)
8. (Kazakhstan) Aleksandr Nedovyesov (second round, retired)

== Draw ==
=== Key ===
- Q = Qualifier
- WC = Wild card
- LL = Lucky loser
- Alt = Alternate
- SE = Special exempt
- PR = Protected ranking
- ITF = ITF entry
- JE = Junior exempt
- w/o = Walkover
- r = Retired
- d = Defaulted
- SR = Special ranking

=== Finals ===
Semifinals
WC	(Turkey) Cem İlkel	2	6	6
(Slovakia) Norbert Gombos	6	3	1
3	(Bosnia and Herzegovina) Mirza Bašić	4	5
(Turkey) Marsel İlhan	6	7

Final
WC	(Turkey) Cem İlkel	2	4
(Turkey) Marsel İlhan	6	6

=== Top half ===
First round
1	(Slovakia) L Lacko	6	6
(Germany) Y Hanfmann	3	2
(Slovakia) F Horanský	7^{9}	6
WC	(Turkey) A Yüksel	6^{7}	0
WC	(Turkey) C İlkel	6	6
(Italy) A Bega	1	2
Q	(Ukraine) V Manafov	6^{5}	5
8	(Kazakhstan) A Nedovyesov	7^{7}	7
4	(Belgium) K Coppejans	6	6
WC	(Turkey) Muhammet Haylaz	2	2
(Slovenia) B Kavčič	4	6^{5}
(Greece) S Tsitsipas	6	7^{7}
(Slovakia) N Gombos	4	6	6
(Czech Republic) Michal Konečný	6	2	2
Q	(Netherlands) T Griekspoor	7^{7}	4	6
7	(Spain) A Menéndez-Maceiras	6^{3}	6	3

Second round
1	(Slovakia) L Lacko	6	6
(Slovakia) F Horanský	3	1
WC	(Turkey) C İlkel	6	2
8	(Kazakhstan) A Nedovyesov	2	0^{r}
4	(Belgium) K Coppejans	3	7	7^{7}
(Greece) S Tsitsipas	6	5	6^{5}
(Slovakia) N Gombos	6	6^{3}	6
Q	(Netherlands) T Griekspoor	4	7^{7}	4

Quarterfinals
1	(Slovakia) L Lacko	4	3
WC	(Turkey) C İlkel	6	6
4	(Belgium) K Coppejans	4	3
(Slovakia) N Gombos	6	6

Semifinals
WC	(Turkey) C İlkel	2	6	6
(Slovakia) N Gombos	6	3	1

=== Bottom half ===
First round
5	(Belarus) I Ivashka	6^{3}	6	6
(Germany) Marc Sieber	7^{7}	3	4
(Kazakhstan) D Popko	6	5	3
(France) C Hemery	3	7	6
(Bosnia and Herzegovina) T Brkić	6^{7}	3
Q	(Netherlands) Kevin Griekspoor	7^{9}	6
(Serbia) N Milojević	7	4	5
3	(Bosnia and Herzegovina) M Bašić	5	6	7
6	(Romania) M Copil	7	6
WC	(Turkey) A Çelikbilek	5	4
(Switzerland) Y Marti	1	2
(Bosnia and Herzegovina) A Šetkić	6	6
Q	(Russia) Vitaly Kozyukov	7^{7}	6
(France) S Doumbia	6^{5}	4
(Turkey) M İlhan	7^{7}	6
2	(Switzerland) M Chiudinelli	6^{3}	4

Second round
5	(Belarus) I Ivashka	6	0	7^{7}
(France) C Hemery	3	6	6^{4}
Q	(Netherlands) K Griekspoor	3	1
3	(Bosnia and Herzegovina) M Bašić	6	6
6	(Romania) M Copil	6	6
(Bosnia and Herzegovina) A Šetkić	4	3
Q	(Russia) V Kozyukov	2	2
(Turkey) M İlhan	6	6

Quarterfinals
5	(Belarus) I Ivashka	6	1	5
3	(Bosnia and Herzegovina) M Bašić	3	6	7
6	(Romania) M Copil	4	6	6^{5}
(Turkey) M İlhan	6	4	7^{7}

Semifinals
3	(Bosnia and Herzegovina) M Bašić	4	5
(Turkey) M İlhan	6	7
