= 2010 Türk Telecom İzmir Cup – Singles =

Singles
- 2010 Türk Telecom İzmir Cup

Final
- Champion: (India) Somdev Devvarman
- Runner-up: (Turkey) Marsel İlhan
- Score: 6–4, 6–3

Events
Singles	Doubles
- Türk Telecom İzmir Cup

Andrea Stoppini was the defending champion, but decided not to participate.
Somdev Devvarman defeated Marsel İlhan 6–4, 6–3 to win the title.

== Seeds ==
1. (Russia) Igor Kunitsyn (quarterfinals)
2. (India) Somdev Devvarman (champion)
3. (France) David Guez (second round)
4. (Turkey) Marsel İlhan (final)
5. (Switzerland) Stéphane Bohli (semifinals)
6. (Austria) Martin Fischer (first round, retired)
7. (Republic of Ireland) Conor Niland (first round)
8. (Belarus) Uladzimir Ignatik (second round)

== Draw ==
Key

- Q = Qualifier
- WC = Wild card
- LL = Lucky loser
- Alt = Alternate
- ITF = ITF entry
- PR = Protected ranking
- SR = Special ranking
- SE = Special exempt
- JE = Junior exempt
- JR = Junior Accelerator Programme entrant
- CO = College Accelerator Programme entrant
- NG = Next Gen Accelerator Program entrant
- w/o = Walkover
- r = Retired
- d = Defaulted

=== Finals ===
Semifinals
5	(Switzerland) Stéphane Bohli	4	4
4	(Turkey) Marsel İlhan	6	6
(Germany) Matthias Bachinger	7	6^{5}	4
2	(India) Somdev Devvarman	6^{3}	7	6

Final
4	(Turkey) Marsel İlhan	4	3
2	(India) Somdev Devvarman	6	6

=== Top half ===
First round
1	(Russia) I Kunitsyn	6	7
(United Kingdom) J Baker	2	6^{1}
LL	(Australia) S Kadir	6	5	6
(Russia) M Vasiliev	4	7	4
(Latvia) A Juška	3	0
WC	(Switzerland) G Bastl	6	6
(Australia) R Junaid	4	1
5	(Switzerland) S Bohli	6	6
4	(Turkey) M İlhan	6	6
(Australia) J Lemke	4	3
(Montenegro) G Tošić	1	2
Q	(Ukraine) A Smirnov	6	6
(Slovakia) M Kližan	3	6	6
Q	(Greece) T Angelinos	6	1	1
WC	(Australia) S Groth	7	3	5
8	(Belarus) U Ignatik	6^{2}	6	7

Second round
1	(Russia) I Kunitsyn	7	6
LL	(Australia) S Kadir	5	3
WC	(Switzerland) G Bastl	3	2
5	(Switzerland) S Bohli	6	6
4	(Turkey) M İlhan	6	6
Q	(Ukraine) A Smirnov	3	1
(Slovakia) M Kližan	6	6
8	(Belarus) U Ignatik	4	4

Quarterfinals
1	(Russia) I Kunitsyn	3	2
5	(Switzerland) S Bohli	6	6
4	(Turkey) M İlhan	6
(Slovakia) M Kližan	2	r

Semifinals
5	(Switzerland) S Bohli	4	4
4	(Turkey) M İlhan	6	6

=== Bottom half ===
First round
6	(Austria) M Fischer	3^{r}
(Spain) R Bautista-Agut	4
(Italy) F Cipolla	3	4
(Luxembourg) G Müller	6	6
(Germany) M Bachinger	6	6
(Switzerland) M Lammer	2	2
Q	(Croatia) M Bradarić	3	1
3	(France) D Guez	6	6
7	(Republic of Ireland) C Niland	5	2
(Belgium) Y Mertens	7	6
(Portugal) J Sousa	6	6
Q	(Russia) M Elgin	3	2
WC	(Turkey) H Akkoyun	6	6
(Russia) A Kumantsov	3	3
WC	(Turkey) T Altuna	3	3
2	(India) S Devvarman	6	6

Second round
(Spain) R Bautista-Agut	6	6^{3}	2
(Luxembourg) G Müller	2	7	6
(Germany) M Bachinger	6	7
3	(France) D Guez	0	5
(Belgium) Y Mertens	3	6	6
(Portugal) J Sousa	6	3	3
WC	(Turkey) H Akkoyun	1	1
2	(India) S Devvarman	6	6

Quarterfinals
(Luxembourg) G Müller	2	3
(Germany) M Bachinger	6	6
(Belgium) Y Mertens	1	6	4
2	(India) S Devvarman	6	2	6

Semifinals
(Germany) M Bachinger	7	6^{5}	4
2	(India) S Devvarman	6^{3}	7	6
