= 2017 Türk Telecom İzmir Cup =

- Date: 18–24 September
- Edition: 10th
- Surface: Hard
- Location: İzmir, Turkey

Champions

Singles
- (Ukraine) Illya Marchenko

Doubles
- (United Kingdom) Scott Clayton / (United Kingdom) Jonny O'Mara
← 2016 ·	Türk Telecom İzmir Cup	· 2018 →

The 2017 Türk Telecom İzmir Cup was a professional tennis tournament played on hard courts. It was the tenth edition of the tournament which was part of the 2017 ATP Challenger Tour. It took place in İzmir, Turkey between 18 and 24 September 2017.

== Singles main-draw entrants ==
=== Seeds ===
Country	Player	Rank^{1}	Seed
TUN	Malek Jaziri	75	1
KAZ	Alexander Bublik	101	2
UKR	Sergiy Stakhovsky	103	3
ITA	Matteo Berrettini	141	4
ITA	Luca Vanni	152	5
SRB	Nikola Milojević	159	6
BLR	Uladzimir Ignatik	160	7
BIH	Aldin Šetkić	174	8

- ^{1} Rankings are as of 11 September 2017.

=== Other entrants ===
The following players received wildcards into the singles main draw:

- (Turkey) Sarp Ağabigün
- (Turkey) Altuğ Çelikbilek
- (Turkey) Muhammet Haylaz
- (Turkey) Anıl Yüksel

The following players received entry into the singles main draw as special exempts:

- (Italy) Matteo Berrettini
- (Kazakhstan) Alexander Bublik

The following players received entry from the qualifying draw:

- (France) Yannick Jankovits
- (Germany) Robin Kern
- (Austria) Lucas Miedler
- (Germany) Marc Sieber

The following player received entry as a lucky loser:

- (Belarus) Mikalai Haliak

== Champions ==
=== Singles ===
- (Ukraine) Illya Marchenko def. (France) Stéphane Robert 7–6^{(7–2)}, 6–0.

=== Doubles ===
- (United Kingdom) Scott Clayton / (United Kingdom) Jonny O'Mara def. (Ukraine) Denys Molchanov / (Ukraine) Sergiy Stakhovsky Walkover.
