= 2010 Türk Telecom İzmir Cup =

- Date: September 20–26, 2010
- Edition: 3rd
- Location: İzmir, Turkey

Champions

Singles
- (India) Somdev Devvarman

Doubles
- (Australia) Rameez Junaid / (Germany) Frank Moser
- Türk Telecom İzmir Cup

The 2010 Türk Telecom İzmir Cup was a professional tennis tournament played on outdoor hard courts. It was part of the 2010 ATP Challenger Tour. It took place in İzmir, Turkey between September 20 and 26, 2010.

== Entrants ==
=== Seeds ===
Nationality	Player	Ranking*	Seeding
RUS	Igor Kunitsyn	104	1
IND	Somdev Devvarman	113	2
FRA	David Guez	125	3
TUR	Marsel İlhan	128	4
SUI	Stéphane Bohli	131	5
AUT	Martin Fischer	134	6
IRL	Conor Niland	146	7
BLR	Uladzimir Ignatik	160	8

- Rankings are as of September 13, 2010.

=== Other entrants ===
The following players received wildcards into the singles main draw:

- (Switzerland) George Bastl
- (Australia) Samuel Groth
- (Turkey) Haluk Akkoyun
- (Turkey) Tuna Altuna

The following players received entry from the qualifying draw:

- (Greece) Theodoros Angelinos
- (Croatia) Marin Bradarić
- (Russia) Mikhail Elgin
- (Australia) Sadik Kadir (as a Lucky loser)
- (Ukraine) Artem Smirnov

== Champions ==
=== Singles ===
(India) Somdev Devvarman def. (Turkey) Marsel İlhan, 6–4, 6–3

=== Doubles ===
(Australia) Rameez Junaid / (Germany) Frank Moser def. (United Kingdom) Jamie Delgado / (United Kingdom) Jonathan Marray, 6–2, 6–4
