= Sean Thornley =

British tennis player

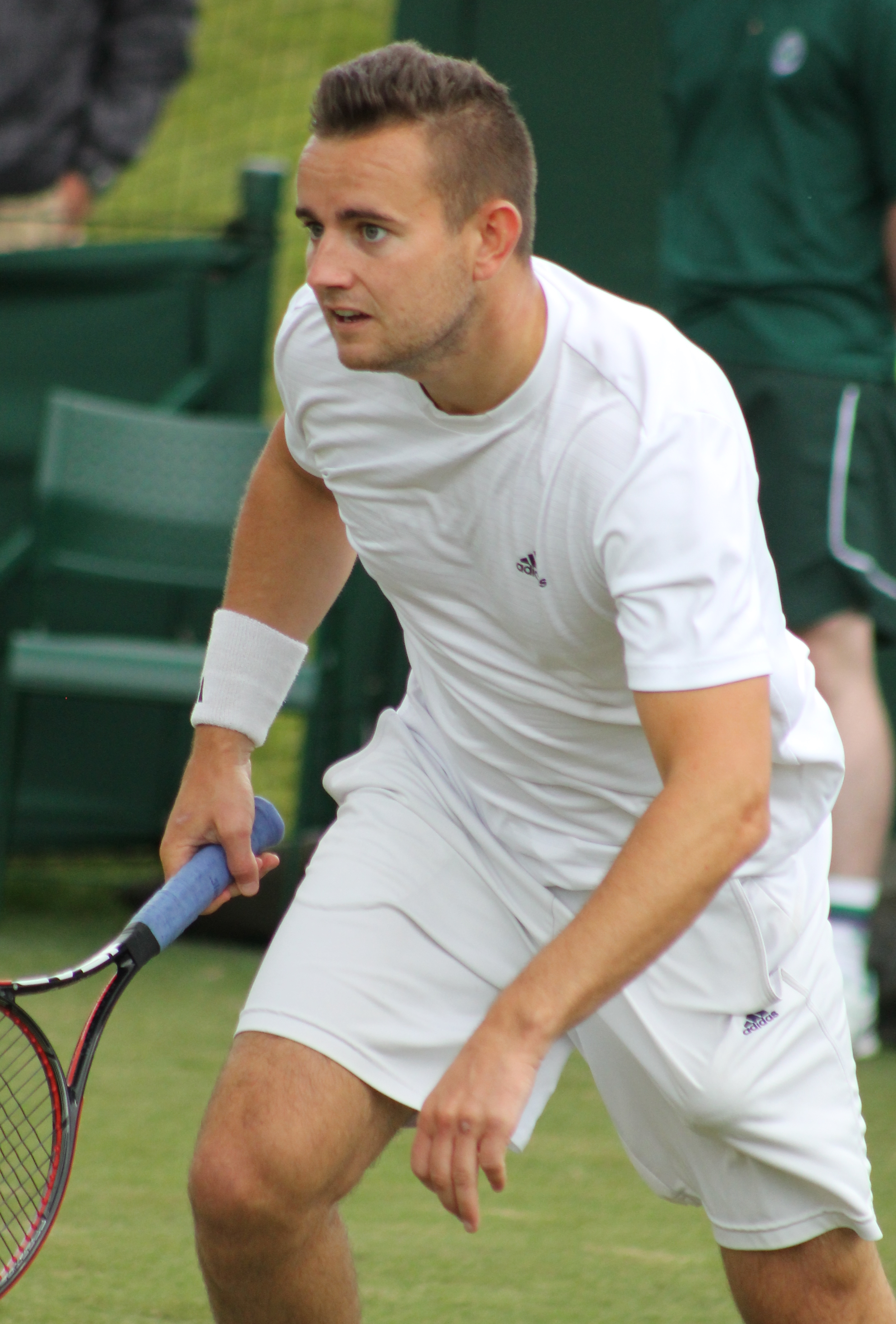
- Country (sports): (United Kingdom) Great Britain
- Residence: West Wickham, London
- Born: 31 May 1989 (age 37) Bristol, England
- Plays: Right-handed

Singles
- Highest ranking: No. 538 (12 September 2011)

Doubles
- Career record: 0–3
- Career titles: 23 (21 ITF Futures / 2 ATP Challengers)
- Highest ranking: No. 160 (24 September 2012)

Grand Slam doubles results
- Wimbledon: 1R (2011, 2013)
- Last updated on: 18 July 2016.

Sean Thornley (born 31 May 1989) is a former British tennis player, best known for playing on the doubles circuit with David Rice.

== Career ==
In 2011 Thornley and Rice qualified for the Men's Doubles at Wimbledon. They lost in the first round to Jamie Murray and Sergiy Stakhovsky, 3–6, 5–7.

After a successful year, Thornley and Rice were awarded a wildcard in 2013 in to the Wimbledon Championships Doubles Main Draw, where they lost in the first round in five sets, 4–6, 3–6, 7–6^{(7)}, 6–4, 4–6 to Marinko Matosevic and Frank Moser.

Sean Thornley and David Rice have won 21 international doubles titles together.

Thornley retired from professional tennis in 2015 and now works in the commercial department at Arsenal Football Club.

== Challenger and Futures finals ==
=== Doubles: 47 (23–24) ===
Legend (doubles) ATP Challenger Tour (2–3) ITF Futures Tour (21–21)	Titles by surface Hard (19–22) Clay (2–2) Grass (1–0) Carpet (1–0)

Result	W–L	Date	Tournament	Tier	Surface	Partner	Opponents	Score
Loss	0–1	May 2007	Greece F2, Syros	Futures	Hard	(United Kingdom) Iain Atkinson	(United Kingdom) Lee Childs (United Kingdom) Edward Corrie	3–6, 5–7
Loss	0–2	Aug 2009	India F7, New Delhi	Futures	Hard	(United Kingdom) Chris Eaton	(India) Ashutosh Singh (India) Vishnu Vardhan	3–6, 7–6^{(7–5)}, [8–10]
Win	1–2	Oct 2009	Greece F2, Paros	Futures	Carpet	(United Kingdom) David Rice	(Italy) Claudio Grassi (Russia) Mikhail Vasiliev	6–4, 2–6, [10–8]
Win	2–2	Sep 2010	Great Britain F13, London	Futures	Hard	(United Kingdom) David Rice	(Italy) Claudio Grassi (United Kingdom) Alexander Slabinsky	2–6, 6–3, [10–0]
Loss	2–3	Sep 2010	Great Britain F14, Nottingham	Futures	Hard	(United Kingdom) Marcus Willis	(United Kingdom) Lewis Burton (United Kingdom) Dan Evans	5–7, 6–1, [11–13]
Loss	2–4	Sep 2010	Great Britain F15, Wrexham	Futures	Hard	(United Kingdom) David Rice	(United Kingdom) Lewis Burton (United Kingdom) Dan Evans	6–7^{(6–8)}, 4–6
Win	3–4	Feb 2011	France F3, Bressuire	Futures	Hard (i)	(United Kingdom) David Rice	(France) Medy Chettar (France) Valentin Nourrissat	Walkover
Loss	3–5	Mar 2011	Rimouski, Canada	Challenger	Hard (i)	(United Kingdom) David Rice	(Philippines) Treat Huey (Canada) Vasek Pospisil	0–6, 1–6
Loss	3–6	Apr 2011	Turkey F12, Antalya	Futures	Hard	(United Kingdom) David Rice	(Serbia) Nikola Čačić (Slovakia) Jozef Kovalík	6–4, 4–6, [4–10]
Win	4–6	Apr 2011	Great Britain F5, Bournemouth	Futures	Clay	(United Kingdom) David Rice	(Spain) Carles Poch Gradin (United Kingdom) Alexander Slabinsky	6–3, 6–4
Loss	4–7	May 2011	Great Britain F6, Edinburgh	Futures	Clay	(United Kingdom) David Rice	(United Kingdom) James Feaver (Australia) Jarryd Maher	6–2, 0–6, [6–10]
Win	5–7	May 2011	Israel F4, Ramat HaSharon	Futures	Hard	(United Kingdom) David Rice	(Israel) Tal Eros (Israel) Amir Weintraub	3–6, 6–3, [11–9]
Loss	5–8	May 2011	Israel F5, Ramat HaSharon	Futures	Hard	(United Kingdom) David Rice	(United States) John Paul Fruttero (Israel) Amir Weintraub	7–6^{(7–4)}, 6–7^{(3–7)}, [11–13]
Win	6–8	Jul 2011	Great Britain F9, Ilkley	Futures	Grass	(United Kingdom) David Rice	(United Kingdom) Chris Eaton (United Kingdom) Josh Goodall	6–7^{(2–7)}, 6–3, [10–7]
Win	7–8	Aug 2011	Great Britain F12, London	Futures	Hard	(United Kingdom) David Rice	(South Africa) Ruan Roelofse (India) Sanam Singh	6–3, 6–2
Win	8–8	Sep 2011	Great Britain F13, Wrexham	Futures	Hard	(United Kingdom) David Rice	(United Kingdom) James Feaver (Republic of Ireland) Daniel Glancy	6–2, 7–5
Loss	8–9	Sep 2011	Great Britain F15, Nottingham	Futures	Hard	(United Kingdom) David Rice	(United Kingdom) Josh Goodall (United Kingdom) Marcus Willis	4–6, 6–7^{(6–8)}
Win	9–9	Oct 2011	Turkey F25, Antalya	Futures	Hard	(United Kingdom) David Rice	(Russia) Mikhail Biryukov (Russia) Dmitri Sitak	2–6, 6–4, [10–6]
Win	10–9	Oct 2011	Turkey F26, Antalya	Futures	Hard	(United Kingdom) David Rice	(Canada) Érik Chvojka (Czech Republic) Michal Konečný	7–6^{(11–9)}, 6–3
Win	11–9	Oct 2011	Great Britain F17, Cardiff	Futures	Hard (i)	(United Kingdom) Oliver Golding	(United Kingdom) Daniel Cox (United Kingdom) Daniel Smethurst	6–4, 6–4
Loss	11–10	Jan 2012	Great Britain F1, Glasgow	Futures	Hard (i)	(United Kingdom) David Rice	(United Kingdom) Chris Eaton (United Kingdom) Dominic Inglot	5–7, 2–6
Loss	11–11	Jan 2012	Great Britain F2, Sheffield	Futures	Hard (i)	(United Kingdom) David Rice	(United Kingdom) Chris Eaton (United Kingdom) Dominic Inglot	3–6, 5–7
Win	12–11	Jan 2012	Great Britain F3, Birkenhead	Futures	Hard (i)	(United Kingdom) David Rice	(United Kingdom) Lewis Burton (United Kingdom) Chris Eaton	6–2, 6–3
Loss	12–12	Mar 2012	Great Britain F4, Tipton	Futures	Hard (i)	(United Kingdom) David Rice	(United Kingdom) Chris Eaton (United Kingdom) Dominic Inglot	3–6, 4–6
Loss	12–13	Aug 2012	Great Britain F12, Wrexham	Futures	Hard	(United Kingdom) Oliver Golding	(United Kingdom) Lewis Burton (United Kingdom) Edward Corrie	4–6, 0–6
Win	13–13	Aug 2012	Great Britain F13, London	Futures	Hard	(United Kingdom) Andrew Fitzpatrick	(United Kingdom) Tom Burn (United Kingdom) Dan Evans	7–6^{(7–2)}, 6–2
Win	14–13	Sep 2012	İzmir, Turkey	Challenger	Hard	(United Kingdom) David Rice	(Australia) Brydan Klein (Australia) Dane Propoggia	7–6^{(10–8)}, 6–2
Win	15–13	Oct 2012	Great Britain F17, Glasgow	Futures	Hard (i)	(United Kingdom) David Rice	(Lithuania) Laurynas Grigelis (Germany) Bastian Knittel	6–3, 6–2
Win	16–13	Jan 2013	Great Britain F1, Glasgow	Futures	Hard (i)	(United Kingdom) David Rice	(United Kingdom) Scott Clayton (United Kingdom) Richard Gabb	7–6^{(7–5)}, 6–2
Win	17–13	Feb 2013	Great Britain F3, Sheffield	Futures	Hard (i)	(United Kingdom) David Rice	(United Kingdom) Dan Evans (United Kingdom) Andrew Fitzpatrick	6–2, 7–6^{(8–6)}
Loss	17–14	Feb 2013	Great Britain F4, Wirral	Futures	Hard (i)	(Republic of Ireland) James Cluskey	(United Kingdom) Lewis Burton (United Kingdom) Neal Skupski	6–7^{(5–7)}, 6–2, [7–10]
Win	18–14	Mar 2013	Great Britain F5, Cardiff	Futures	Hard (i)	(United Kingdom) David Rice	(United Kingdom) Edward Corrie (United Kingdom) Neal Skupski	6–1, 7–5
Win	18–15	Mar 2013	Great Britain F6, Shrewsbury	Futures	Hard (i)	(United Kingdom) David Rice	(Belgium) Sander Gillé (Belgium) Jonas Merckx	6–2, 6–1
Loss	18–16	Apr 2013	USA F10, Little Rock	Futures	Hard	(United Kingdom) David Rice	(United States) Chase Buchanan (United States) Austin Krajicek	2–6, 3–6
Loss	18–17	Aug 2013	Great Britain F16, Chiswick	Futures	Hard	(United Kingdom) David Rice	(United Kingdom) Liam Broady (United Kingdom) Joshua Ward-Hibbert	6–7^{(5–7)}, 6–2, [6–10]
Win	19–17	Oct 2013	France F18, Nevers	Futures	Hard (i)	(United Kingdom) David Rice	(France) Mathieu Rodrigues (France) Gleb Sakharov	6–3, 6–4
Loss	19–18	Oct 2013	France F19, Saint-Dizier	Futures	Hard (i)	(United Kingdom) David Rice	(Belgium) Germain Gigounon (France) Hugo Nys	6–7^{(4–7)}, 4–6
Win	20–18	Oct 2013	Great Britain F21, Loughborough	Futures	Hard (i)	(United Kingdom) David Rice	(Netherlands) Kevin Griekspoor (Netherlands) Scott Griekspoor	6–3, 6–7^{(3–7)}, [10–5]
Win	21–18	Jan 2014	Great Britain F1, Glasgow	Futures	Hard (i)	(United Kingdom) David Rice	(United Kingdom) Edward Corrie (United Kingdom) Daniel Smethurst	6–3, 6–1
Win	22–18	Jan 2014	Great Britain F2, Sunderland	Futures	Hard (i)	(United Kingdom) David Rice	(United Kingdom) Richard Gabb (United Kingdom) Joshua Ward-Hibbert	6–3, 6–3
Loss	22–19	Jan 2014	Great Britain F3, Sheffield	Futures	Hard (i)	(United Kingdom) David Rice	(United Kingdom) Edward Corrie (United Kingdom) Daniel Smethurst	6–3, 2–6, [8–10]
Loss	22–20	Mar 2014	Great Britain F8, Tipton	Futures	Hard (i)	(United Kingdom) David Rice	(United Kingdom) Lewis Burton (United Kingdom) Marcus Willis	6–4, 6–7^{(5–7)}, [6–10]
Win	23–20	Jul 2014	Tampere, Estonia	Challenger	Clay	(Philippines) Ruben Gonzales	(Sweden) Elias Ymer (Russia) Anton Zaitcev	6–7^{(5–7)}, 7–6^{(12–10)}, [10–8]
Loss	23–21	Aug 2014	Liberec, Czech Republic	Challenger	Clay	(Philippines) Ruben Gonzales	(Czech Republic) Roman Jebavý (Czech Republic) Jaroslav Pospíšil	4–6, 3–6
Loss	23–22	Oct 2014	Great Britain F17, Manchester	Futures	Hard (i)	(United Kingdom) Darren Walsh	(Lithuania) Laurynas Grigelis (United Kingdom) David Rice	4–6, 4–6
Loss	23–23	Nov 2014	Knoxville, US	Challenger	Hard (i)	(Portugal) Gastão Elias	(Latvia) Miķelis Lībietis (United States) Hunter Reese	3–6, 4–6
Loss	23–24	Mar 2015	Great Britain F5, Shrewsbury	Futures	Hard (i)	(United Kingdom) Marcus Willis	(United Kingdom) Luke Bambridge (United Kingdom) Scott Clayton	6–7^{(3–7)}, 4–6
