= Louk Sorensen =

Irish former professional tennis player (born 1985)

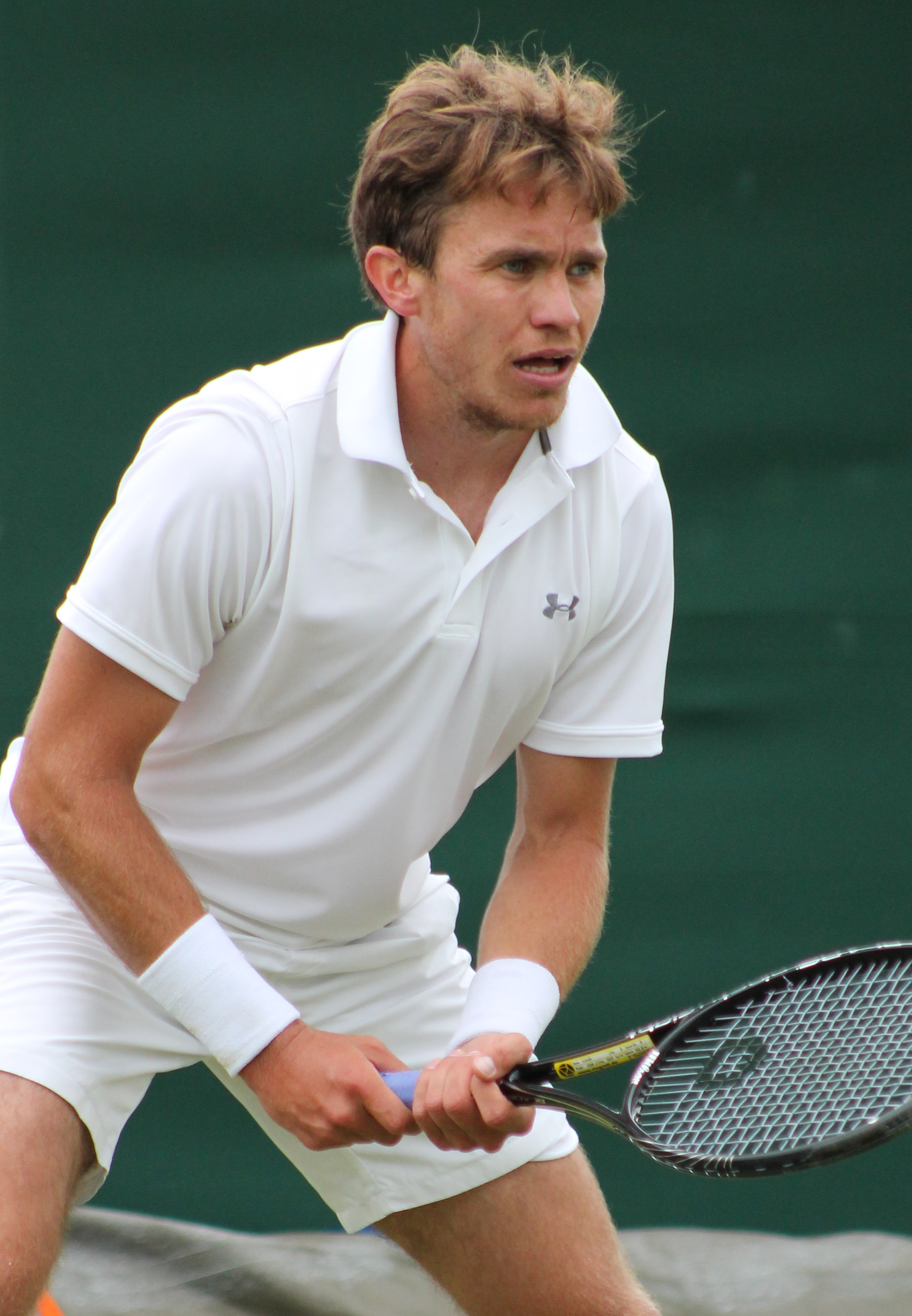
- Country (sports): Ireland
- Residence: Stuttgart, Germany
- Born: 7 January 1985 (age 41) Schwäbisch Hall, Germany
- Height: 1.75 m (5 ft 9 in)
- Turned pro: 2003
- Retired: 2015
- Plays: Right-handed (two-handed backhand)
- Prize money: $ 199,032

Singles
- Career record: 5–6 (in ATP Tour, Grand Slam main draw matches and Davis Cup)
- Career titles: 0
- Highest ranking: No. 175 (15 September 2014)

Grand Slam singles results
- Australian Open: 2R (2010)
- French Open: Q1 (2010)
- Wimbledon: Q2 (2008)
- US Open: 1R (2011)

Doubles
- Career record: 0–0 (in ATP (World) Tour and Grand Slam main draw matches, and in Davis Cup)
- Career titles: 0
- Highest ranking: No. 552 (12 December 2005)
- Last updated on: 24 June 2022.

Louk Sorensen (born 7 January 1985) is an Irish former professional tennis player.

Sorensen was the first player representing Ireland to win a Grand Slam event main draw match in the Open Era. His father, Sean, was the first Irishman to play a Grand Slam main draw match in the Open Era, going out in the first round of Wimbledon. (Matt Doyle reached the fourth round of the US Open in 1982 but played under the American flag then, only becoming an Irish citizen in 1985).

His final event was the 2015 Aegon GB Pro-Series Glasgow where he lost in qualifying. Since retiring from playing, Sorensen has begun coaching and currently coaches Australian player John Millman.

== Personal life ==
Sorensen's father Sean is the current captain of the Ireland Davis Cup team and played in the first round of Wimbledon in 1977, losing to Rod Laver. Sean also finished runner-up to Mats Wilander at an ATP Challenger Tour event in Buchholz, Germany, in February 1982. Louk's older brother, Kevin, was also a professional tennis player and competed for Ireland in the Davis Cup until 2006. He also has two sisters, Lisa and Josephine. Sorensen was raised in Germany and although his parents now live in Dublin, he remained in Stuttgart, training with German coach, Carsten Arriens, who also coached Germans Andreas Beck and Alexander Waske, and playing for third division Bundesliga tennis club TC Doggenburg. He is a prominent member of the Irish Davis Cup team, holding a 10–2 singles record, having made his debut in July 2005.

Sorensen's surname is of Norwegian origin. His mother, Helga, has both German and Austrian blood.

== Career ==
=== 2006 ===
Sorensen began his professional career with participation in the France F15 Futures event in Sarreguemines on 25 September, beating Stéphane Piro to reach the 2nd round, before ultimately losing to Riccardo Ghedin.

=== 2007 ===
In February 2007, Sorensen won his first senior international title in the Portugal F1 Futures event in Faro, where he beat Canadian Pierre-Ludovic Duclos in the final 6–1, 6–1. This was followed by finishing runner-up in the U.A.E. F1 Futures tournament in April in Dubai, but winning the U.A.E. F2 Futures tournament, again in Dubai, just a week later.

=== 2008 ===
On 21 January 2008, he finished as runner-up in the Portugal F2 Futures tournament in Albufeira to Romanian Victor Ioniță, losing 6–2, 6–7, 2–6. Sorensen won his first ATP Challenger event at the Volkswagen Challenger series in Wolfsburg in February, defeating Farrukh Dustov 7–6, 4–6, 6–4 in the final. He reached his career high ATP ranking of 246 on 7 April 2008. Sorensen made his first attempt to qualify for a Grand Slam in June 2008 at Wimbledon and defeated home player Edward Seator 6–2, 6–1 in the first qualifying round. However, Sorensen was forced to retire through injury in the third set of his next match against Édouard Roger-Vasselin, with the match delicately balanced at 1 set each.

=== 2009 ===
Sorensen again attempted to qualify for a Grand Slam in January 2009 at the Australian Open, defeating Victor Crivoi of Romania in the first qualifying round 4–6, 7–6, 6–3, but he again fell at the second hurdle, this time to Peter Polansky 6–4, 1–6, 3–6. He put this disappointment behind him to reach the final of the Croatia F1 Futures tournament in Zagreb, losing out to Martin Fischer.

=== 2010 ===
Sorensen began 2010 by qualifying for his first ATP World Tour 250 series tournament, the first round of the 2010 Aircel Chennai Open, losing to Stéphane Robert 1–6, 2–6. He continued this good form when he became the first Irish tennis player to qualify for a Grand Slam tournament since American-born Matt Doyle in 1985, qualifying for the first round of the Australian Open after defeating Benjamin Balleret, Michael Yani and Daniel King-Turner in the qualifying rounds. He was drawn against Lu Yen-hsun of Chinese Taipei, ranked 101st in the world, in the first round. Sorensen went on to become the first ever player representing Ireland to win a Grand Slam match in the Open Era when he beat Lu in 4 sets, 6–4, 3–6, 6–2, 6–1. He faced 6' 9" American John Isner in the second round, falling 6–3, 7–6, 7–5. Before the start of the tournament, Sorensen was ranked at No. 284 by the ATP, however, 2 weeks later he had jumped a huge 71 places to a career-high No.213. Sorensen could not continue the good form he had shown at the Australian Open, losing in the first round of both the Heilbronn Challenger and the Kazan Challenger in consecutive weeks. He then faced a length three-month lay-off due to a hamstring injury, but made his comeback on 10 May at the Biella Challenger, defeating qualifier Andrea Arnaboldi in his first round match. Sorensen's lengthy absence proved his undoing later in the tournament, however, as his lack of match practice showed during his defeat to Yannick Mertens in the second round. Sorensen attempted to qualify for the French Open main draw 2 weeks later, but lost out to José Acasuso at the first hurdle.

=== 2011 ===
In May 2011 Sorensen was forced to retire from tennis after being plagued by injury since the start of 2010 and decided to call it a career after suffering a knee injury six weeks previous. However, in June, Sorensen came back from retirement and competed in a Futures tournament in Germany and reached the Quarterfinals before pulling out citing injury.

In July, Sorensen competed in the Singles Qualifying of the 2011 MercedesCup. Louk defeated Maximilian Marterer in the first round and Jan Hernych in the second round. In the third round, Sorensen was defeated by Evgeny Donskoy. Should Sorensen have beaten Evgeny, he would have qualified for the main draw of the tournament.

Sorensen played in the 2011 Concurso Internacional de Tenis held in San Sebastián, Spain. In the first round, Louk defeated the wildcard Gianni Mina 6–3, 6–4. In the second round, Sorensen lost to the third seed, Daniel Gimeno Traver 6–4, 5–7, 5–7 after being up a break in the second set.

Sorensen's next tournament was the 2011 US Open, the final Grand Slam of the year. Because of his significant lay-off from tournament action due to injuries, Sorensen's ranking had slipped to 614 from a career-high position of 213 set in February 2010. But he is still entitled to a "protected ranking" of 281, and it was through this he made the US Open qualifying stage. In the first round of the Singles Qualifying, Sorensen upset the 29th seed, Arnau Brugués Davi 7–6, 6–4. In the second round, Sorensen defeated Gastão Elias 6–4, 6–1. In the final round, Sorensen beat Martin Fischer 7–6, 6–1 to ensure that 2 Irish players, Louk and Conor Niland, qualified for the Main Draw. This was Sorensen's second time in his career to qualify for the main draw of a Grand Slam. In the first round, Sorensen was meant face World No. 6, Robin Söderling, but he pulled out due to illness. Instead, Louk faced Rogério Dutra da Silva. Louk retired whilst trailing 0–6, 6–3, 4–6, 0–1, citing recurring cramp.

Sorensen finished off 2011 in rather disappointing form. He lost his opening match in the Brașov Challenger and then failed to qualify for the Ethias Trophy, losing to compatriot Conor Niland. He then entered qualifying for the Stockholm Open, only to lose his opening qualifying match to Íñigo Cervantes Huegun.

=== 2012 ===
2012 once again proved to be an injury-plagued year for Sorensen. He played four futures events in the first two months of the year but then only played once again in the rest of the year, in late July.

=== 2013 ===
After a 12-month injury layoff, Sorensen returned to action at the Mercedes Cup where he lost in the first round of qualifying. He then began playing on the Futures and Challenger circuit again, and in September qualified for the 2013 Türk Telecom İzmir Cup. He reached the final without dropping a set, ultimately losing to top-seed Mikhail Kukushkin. This run to the final improved Sorensen's ranking by 574 places, bringing him up to 490th. He then followed this up the following week by reaching the final of a futures event in Marathon but was forced to withdraw due to injury before the match.

=== 2014 ===
Sorensen continued his push up the rankings in 2014 and claimed his first title in over six years, winning a futures event in Guangzhou. In early April he competed in qualifying for the U.S. Men's Clay Court Championships and pushed top 100 player Ryan Harrison all the way in a close three set match but ultimately lost out. He quickly moved on from the loss to reach the semi-finals of the ATP Cachantún Cup, a challenger event in Santiago. Sorensen then narrowly missed out on making his first ATP Tour main draw since 2011, losing to Mirza Bašić in the final round of qualifying for the Düsseldorf Open. Sorensen's form saw him enter the qualifying draw for Wimbledon, the first time he had competed in grand slam qualifiers since the 2011 US Open, however he was defeated by Malek Jaziri in his opening match. He then played at the Challenger Team "Citta' di Padova" but had to pull out after only two games of his opening match. Sorensen then qualified for the MercedesCup, an ATP World Tour 250 series event. He had been defeated by Philipp Davydenko in the final round of qualifying but received entry to the main draw as a lucky loser. Sorensen pulled off a shock in the first round, defeating world number 68 Igor Sijsling in straight sets to record his second tour win. In the second round, he pushed third seed Roberto Bautista Agut to three sets. However, the world number 23 was able to see off Sorensen in the end. Despite not playing the following week, Sorensen rose to a new career-high ranking of 211, overtaking his previous best from early 2010.

== ATP Challenger and ITF Futures finals ==
=== Singles: 11 (5–6) ===
Legend ATP Challenger (1–2) ITF Futures (4–4)	Finals by surface Hard (3–5) Clay (1–1) Grass (0–0) Carpet (1–0)

Result	W–L	Date	Tournament	Tier	Surface	Opponent	Score
Win	1–0	Sep 2005	Germany F14, Kempten	Futures	Clay	(Croatia) Zeljko Krajan	4–6, 6–3, 7–5
Win	2–0	Mar 2007	Portugal F1, Faro	Futures	Hard	(Canada) Pierre-Ludovic Duclos	6–1, 6–1
Loss	2–1	Apr 2007	United Arab Emirates F1, Dubai	Futures	Hard	(Pakistan) Aisam Qureshi	3–6, 3–6
Win	3–1	Apr 2007	United Arab Emirates F2, Dubai	Futures	Hard	(Australia) Rameez Junaid	6–1, 6–2
Loss	3–2	Jan 2008	Portugal F2, Albufeira	Futures	Hard	(Romania) Victor Ioniță	6–2, 6–7^{(1–7)}, 2–6
Win	4–2	Mar 2008	Wolfsburg, Germany	Challenger	Carpet	(Uzbekistan) Farrukh Dustov	7–6^{(9–7)}, 4–6, 6–4
Loss	4–3	Feb 2009	Croatia F1, Zagreb	Futures	Hard	(Austria) Martin Fischer	3–6, 3–6
Loss	4–4	Sep 2013	İzmir, Turkey	Challenger	Hard	(Kazakhstan) Mikhail Kukushkin	1–6, 4–6
Loss	4–5	Sep 2013	Greece F12, Athens	Futures	Hard	(Serbia) Nikola Milojevic	walkover
Win	5–5	Mar 2014	China F2, Guangzhou	Futures	Hard	(Israel) Amir Weintraub	5–7, 7–5, 6–4
Loss	5–6	Aug 2014	Como, Italy	Challenger	Clay	(Serbia) Viktor Troicki	3–6, 2–6

=== Doubles: 1 (1–0) ===
Legend ATP Challenger (0–0) ITF Futures (1–0)	Finals by surface Hard (0–0) Clay (1–0) Grass (0–0) Carpet (0–0)

Result	W–L	Date	Tournament	Tier	Surface	Partner	Opponents	Score
Win	1–0	Aug 2005	Germany F10, Ingolstadt	Futures	Clay	(Germany) Bastian Knittel	(Germany) Dominik Meffert (Germany) Sebastian Rieschick	walkover

== Performance timeline ==
Key
W	F	SF	QF	#R	RR	Q#	DNQ	A	NH

(W) winner; (F) finalist; (SF) semifinalist; (QF) quarterfinalist; (#R) rounds 4, 3, 2, 1; (RR) round-robin stage; (Q#) qualification round; (DNQ) did not qualify; (A) absent; (NH) not held; (SR) strike rate (events won / competed); (W–L) win–loss record.

=== Singles ===
Tournament	2008	2009	2010	2011	2012	2013	2014	2015	SR	W–L	Win%
Grand Slam tournaments
Australian Open	A	Q2	2R	A	A	A	A	Q1	0 / 1	1–1	50%
French Open	A	A	Q1	A	A	A	A	A	0 / 0	0–0	–
Wimbledon	Q2	A	A	A	A	A	Q1	A	0 / 0	0–0	–
US Open	A	A	A	1R	A	A	Q1	A	0 / 1	0–1	0%
Win–loss	0–0	0–0	1–1	0–1	0–0	0–0	0–0	0–0	0 / 2	1–2	33%
