= Andrea Stoppini =

Italian tennis player

- Country (sports): Italy
- Born: 29 February 1980 (age 45) Trento, Italy
- Turned pro: 1998
- Plays: Right-handed (two-handed backhand)
- Prize money: $289,443

Singles
- Career record: 3–8
- Career titles: 0
- Highest ranking: No. 161 (13 July 2009)

Grand Slam singles results
- Australian Open: 1R (2009)
- French Open: Q1 (2008)
- Wimbledon: Q3 (2009)
- US Open: Q2 (2008, 2009)

Doubles
- Career record: 0–0
- Career titles: 0

Andrea Stoppini (born 29 February 1980) is an Italian former professional tennis player.

== Personal life ==
Currently resides in his city of birth, Trento.

== Tennis career ==
Stoppini turned professional in 1998. His career-high singles ranking is World No. 161, achieved on 13 July 2009.

=== 2006 ===
At the 2006 Legg Mason Tennis Classic, Stoppini (then ranked World No. 246) scored the greatest victory of his career, defeating former World No. 1 Andre Agassi (amidst his retirement tour) in the second round 6–4, 6–3.

=== 2009 ===
In the first round of the 2009 Australian Open, Stoppini lost to defending champion Novak Djokovic, 6–2, 6–3, 7–5.

Making his second appearance at Wimbledon in 2009, he beat the No. 1 qualifying seed Sergiy Stakhovsky from Ukraine 2–6, 6–3, 6–3, in the first qualifying round, Marcus Willis from Great Britain 6–2, 6–4 in the second, before losing to Rajeev Ram 6–4, 6–2, 6–4 in the final qualifying match.
