= Marsel İlhan =

Turkish tennis player (born 1987)

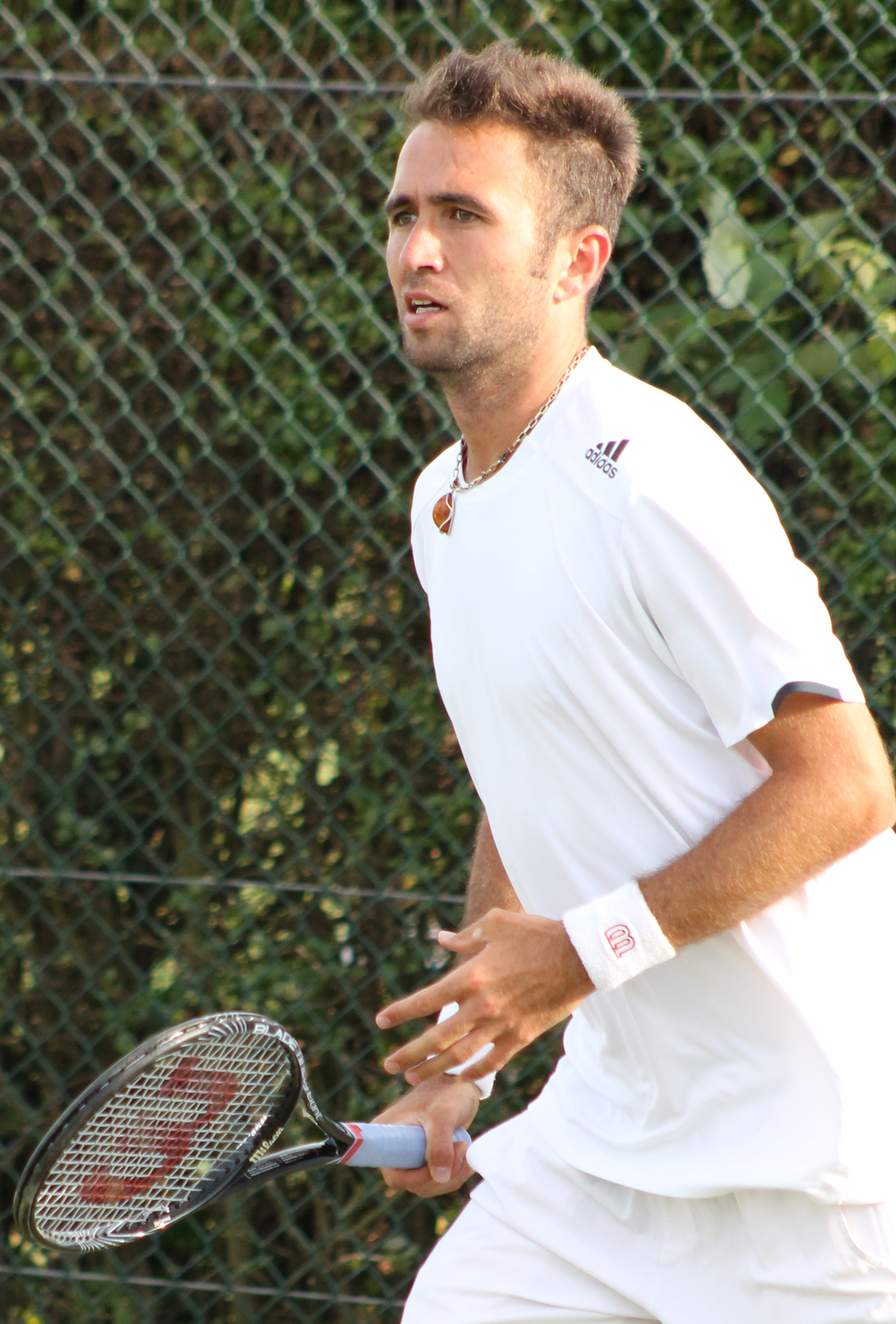
- Country (sports): Turkey
- Residence: Istanbul, Türkiye
- Born: 11 June 1987 (age 39) Samarkand, Uzbek SSR, Soviet Union
- Height: 1.91 m (6 ft 3 in)
- Turned pro: 2006
- Retired: Sep 2024 (last match played)
- Plays: Right-handed (two-handed backhand)
- Coach: Erhan Oral
- Prize money: $1,399,548

Singles
- Career record: 33–59
- Career titles: 0
- Highest ranking: No. 77 (2 March 2015)

Grand Slam singles results
- Australian Open: 2R (2010)
- French Open: 2R (2011)
- Wimbledon: 2R (2010, 2015)
- US Open: 2R (2009, 2011, 2015)

Doubles
- Career record: 0–7
- Career titles: 0
- Highest ranking: No. 564 (25 May 2009)
- Last updated on: 1 October 2025.

Marsel İlhan
Medal record

Representing Turkey

Men's Tennis

Mediterranean Games
Silver medal – second place	2009 Pescara	Singles
Silver medal – second place	2013 Mersin	Singles

Marsel İlhan (Uzbek: Marsel Qahhorovich Hamdamov; born 11 June 1987) is a Turkish former professional tennis player. He has a career-high singles ranking of world No. 77 achieved in March 2015. He is the first ever Turkish player to reach the second round in a Grand Slam tournament, as well as the first to win a Challenger event. He is also the first player from Turkey to enter the top 100 in the world rankings (first ranked at No. 96 in September 2010).

== Career ==
Born in the Uzbek SSR in the Soviet Union (now Uzbekistan), he emigrated to Turkey with his mother in 2004 and he started to play for the Taçspor Tennis Club of İstanbul. He was initially sponsored by Kia Motors Turkey. After several years of intensive training with his new coach Can Üner, a former Turkish tennis player, he made an unprecedented jump within one year from No. 1320 to No. 320 in 2007.

=== 2007–2008 ===
During 2007 and 2008 he won several Future Tournaments and in July 2008, he won his first ATP Challenger title at Ramat HaSharon Israel Open by defeating Ivo Klec from Slovakia by 2 sets 6–4, 6–4.

=== 2009 ===
At the 2009 US Open, İlhan qualified for the main draw of a Grand Slam for the first time in his career. In doing so, he became the first Turkish player in the modern era to do so. In the first round, he defeated Christophe Rochus from Belgium in a five-set thriller. It was his first career ATP and Grand Slam win. He lost his second-round match against John Isner in straight sets.

İlhan, in October qualified for the 2009 PTT Thailand Open. He defeated his first-round opponent Benjamin Becker, but then lost to Jürgen Melzer.

=== 2010 ===
In the first qualification round of 2010 Australian Open he defeated Canadian Peter Polansky 6–1, 6–2. In the second qualification round he beat British No.2 Alex Bogdanovic with the same score 6–4, 6–4. In the 3rd qualification round Marsel lost 1–2 to German tennis player Dieter Kindlmann after a tough game in which he lost the first set 5–7, won the second easily 6–1 and lost the final set 9–11, in a game that lasted well over 3 hours.

However, due to Gilles Simon's injury a spot opened up for an additional player to appear on the main draw. Marsel became the "Lucky Loser" and progressed to the 1st round of Australian Open 2010. Marsel İlhan proved that he was a worthy "Lucky loser" as he easily defeated former World No. 4 Sébastien Grosjean in 3 sets 6–4, 6–3, 7–5. In the second round Marsel lost to world No. 11 Chilean Fernando González in three sets: 3–6, 4–6, 5–7.

In the first round of Wimbledon 2010 he defeated Brazilian Marcos Daniel 3–2, where he made a superb comeback from 0–2 and eventually won the match. In the second round, he played against current World No. 37 player, Victor Hănescu and lost in four sets: 4–6, 4–6, 6–3 and 3–6.

On 20 September 2010 he won his second ATP Challenger Tournament, in Banja Luka, Bosnia and Herzegovina on clay by beating Pere Riba in the final 2–0, 6–0, 7–6. In the following Challenger Cup, the 2010 Türk Telecom İzmir Cup, he reached the final and despite losing, his ranking increased to a career-record 96th in the world – the highest ever for a Turkish tennis player.

=== 2011 ===
He got his highest ATP ranking position of No. 87 in January 2011. Therefore, he played directly in the main draw 2011 Australian Open for the first time during a Grand Slam tournament in his professional career. He lost in the first round to world No. 10 Russian Mikhail Youzhny in straight sets 6–2, 6–3, 7–6.

In the 2011 Indian Wells Masters, he lost against Milos Raonic from Canada in straight sets 6–2 and 7–6. Marsel participated in the second ATP Masters tournament the Miami Masters as a qualifier after negative results from the beginning of 2011. However, he reached the second round in Miami again, but in this round he lost to world No. 17 Serbian Viktor Troicki in 2 sets 6–3, 6–3.

In late May, he qualified as a lucky loser into his first French Open and progressed to the first round. Marsel defeated former World No. 2 Tommy Haas 6–4, 4–6, 7–6, 6–4 in the first round. However, after a gruelling 3h 58m battle with Guillermo García López, he succumbed in five sets 4–6, 6–1, 2–6, 6–4, 11–13.

== ATP Challenger and ITF Futures finals ==
=== Singles: 41 (23–18) ===
Legend ATP Challenger (4–10) ITF Futures (19–8)	Finals by surface Hard (18–10) Clay (5–8)

Result	W–L	Date	Tournament	Tier	Surface	Opponent	Score
Win	1–0	Jun 2007	Turkey F5, İzmir	Futures	Hard	(Israel) Dekel Valtzer	6–4, 6–2
Loss	1–1	Aug 2007	Qarshi, Uzbekistan	Challenger	Hard	(Uzbekistan) Denis Istomin	1–6, 4–6
Win	2–1	Oct 2007	Spain F37, Córdoba	Futures	Hard	(Spain) Miguel Ángel López Jaén	6–3, 6–3
Loss	2–2	Nov 2007	Tunisia F6, Jerba	Futures	Hard	(France) Jonathan Eysseric	5–7, 4–6
Loss	2–3	Feb 2008	Croatia F2, Zagreb	Futures	Hard	(Czech Republic) Pavel Šnobel	1–6, 6–3, 3–6
Loss	2–4	Apr 2008	Turkey F5, Antalya	Futures	Clay	(Moldova) Andrei Gorban	4–6, 6–1, 0–6
Loss	2–5	May 2008	Turkey F6, Antalya	Futures	Clay	(France) Jonathan Eysseric	6–3, 4–6, 4–6
Win	3–5	May 2008	Uzbekistan F2, Namangan	Futures	Hard	(Czech Republic) Pavel Šnobel	6–0, 6–7^{(4–7)}, 6–4
Win	4–5	Jul 2008	Turkey F7, Istanbul	Futures	Hard	(Germany) Sebastian Rieschick	6–3, 5–7, 7–5
Win	5–5	Jul 2008	Ramat HaSharon, Israel	Challenger	Hard	(Slovakia) Ivo Klec	6–4, 6–4
Win	6–5	Apr 2009	Turkey F4, Antalya	Futures	Hard	(Denmark) Martin Killemose	6–3, 6–2
Win	7–5	Apr 2009	Turkey F5, Antalya	Futures	Hard	(Chile) Hans Podlipnik Castillo	6–1, 6–1
Loss	7–6	May 2009	İzmir, Turkey	Challenger	Hard	(Italy) Andrea Stoppini	6–7^{(5–7)}, 2–6
Win	8–6	Sep 2010	Banja Luka, Bosnia & Herzegovina	Challenger	Clay	(Spain) Pere Riba	6–0, 7–6^{(7–4)}
Loss	8–7	Sep 2010	İzmir, Turkey	Challenger	Hard	(India) Somdev Devvarman	4–6, 3–6
Loss	8–8	Jul 2011	Scheveningen, Netherlands	Challenger	Clay	(Belgium) Steve Darcis	3–6, 6–4, 2–6
Loss	8–8	Sep 2011	İzmir, Turkey	Challenger	Hard	(Slovakia) Lukáš Lacko	4–6, 3–6
Loss	8–9	Jul 2012	Astana, Kazakhstan	Challenger	Hard	(Russia) Evgeny Donskoy	3–6, 4–6
Win	9–9	Nov 2012	Turkey F42, Antalya	Futures	Hard	(Ukraine) Volodymyr Uzhylovskyi	7–6^{(10–8)}, 6–2
Win	10–9	Nov 2012	Turkey F44, Antalya	Futures	Hard	(Belgium) Yannik Reuter	6–3, 6–2
Loss	10–10	Mar 2013	Turkey F9, Antalya	Futures	Hard	(Moldova) Radu Albot	3–6, 6–3, 6–7^{(7–9)}
Win	11–10	Mar 2013	Turkey F12, Antalya	Futures	Hard	(Italy) Matteo Fago	6–2, 6–2
Win	12–10	May 2013	Turkey F18, Antalya	Futures	Hard	(France) Jules Marie	6–1, 6–2
Win	13–10	Jun 2013	Turkey F21, Mersin	Futures	Clay	(Austria) Michael Linzer	7–6^{(7–5)}, 3–6, 6–4
Loss	13–11	Jul 2013	Eskişehir, Turkey	Challenger	Hard	(Belgium) David Goffin	6–4, 5–7, 2–6
Win	14–11	Aug 2013	Turkey F31, İzmir	Futures	Hard	(Australia) Dane Propoggia	6–2, 6–4
Win	15–11	Sep 2013	Turkey F34, Antalya	Futures	Hard	(Argentina) Maximiliano Estévez	6–4, 6–2
Win	16–11	Sep 2013	Turkey F35, Antalya	Futures	Hard	(Argentina) Maximiliano Estévez	6–1, 3–1 ret.
Win	17–11	Mar 2014	Kazan, Russia	Challenger	Hard	(Germany) Michael Berrer	7–6^{(8–6)}, 6–3
Loss	17–12	Jul 2014	Astana, Kazakhstan	Challenger	Hard	(Lithuania) Ričardas Berankis	5–7, 7–5, 3–6
Loss	17–13	Nov 2014	Mouilleron-le-Captif, France	Challenger	Hard	(France) Pierre-Hugues Herbert	2–6, 3–6
Loss	17–14	Apr 2015	Mersin, Turkey	Challenger	Clay	(Belgium) Kimmer Coppejans	2–6, 2–6
Win	18–14	Sep 2016	İzmir, Turkey	Challenger	Hard	(Turkey) Cem İlkel	6–2, 6–4
Win	19–14	Apr 2017	Turkey F14, Antalya	Futures	Clay	(Croatia) Mate Delić	6–2, 7–5
Loss	19–15	Apr 2017	Turkey F16, Antalya	Futures	Clay	(Uruguay) Martín Cuevas	6–4, 4–6, 2–6
Win	20–15	Aug 2017	Belarus F1, Minsk	Futures	Hard	(United Kingdom) Jonathan Gray	6–1, 6–2
Win	21–15	Aug 2017	Belarus F2, Minsk	Futures	Hard	(Belarus) Dzmitry Zhyrmont	6–3, 6–3
Win	22–15	Sep 2017	Turkey F33, Antalya	Futures	Clay	(Austria) Bastian Trinker	4–6, 6–1, 6–4
Loss	22–16	Apr 2018	Turkey F13, Antalya	Futures	Clay	(Austria) Thomas Statzberger	4–6, 6–1, 5–7
Win	23–16	May 2018	Turkey F19, Antalya	Futures	Clay	(Romania) Bogdan Borza	6–4, 6–4
Loss	23–17	Jun 2018	Turkey F21, Antalya	Futures	Clay	(Germany) Peter Heller	6–2, 2–6, 3–6
Loss	23–18	Sep 2019	M15 Antalya, Turkey	World Tennis Tour	Clay	(Germany) Paul Woerner	6–3, 3–6, 0–6

=== Doubles: 3 (1–2) ===
Legend ATP Challenger (0–1) ITF Futures (1–1)	Finals by surface Hard (1–2) Clay (0–0) Grass (0–0) Carpet (0–0)

Result	W–L	Date	Tournament	Tier	Surface	Partner	Opponents	Score
Win	1–0	Jul 2008	Turkey F7, Istanbul	Futures	Hard	(Uzbekistan) Arsen Asanov	(Italy) Riccardo Ghedin (Czech Republic) Jiří Krkoška	6–4, 7–6^{(10–8)}
Loss	1–1	Aug 2009	Istanbul, Turkey	Challenger	Hard	(Bulgaria) Grigor Dimitrov	(Portugal) Fred Gil (Sweden) Filip Prpic	6–3, 2–6, [6–10]
Loss	1–2	May 2013	Turkey F18, Antalya	Futures	Hard	(Turkey) Haluk Akkoyun	(Ukraine) Gleb Alekseenko (Ukraine) Vadim Alekseenko	walkover

== Performance timeline ==
Key
W	F	SF	QF	#R	RR	Q#	P#	DNQ	A	Z#	PO	G	S	B	NMS	NTI	P	NH

(W) winner; (F) finalist; (SF) semifinalist; (QF) quarterfinalist; (#R) rounds 4, 3, 2, 1; (RR) round-robin stage; (Q#) qualification round; (P#) preliminary round; (DNQ) did not qualify; (A) absent; (Z#) Davis/Fed Cup Zonal Group (with number indication) or (PO) play-off; (G) gold, (S) silver or (B) bronze Olympic/Paralympic medal; (NMS) not a Masters tournament; (NTI) not a Tier I tournament; (P) postponed; (NH) not held; (SR) strike rate (events won / competed); (W–L) win–loss record.

=== Singles ===
Tournament	2008	2009	2010	2011	2012	2013	2014	2015	2016	SR	W–L	Win%
Grand Slam tournaments
Australian Open	A	Q1	2R	1R	Q1	Q3	Q2	1R	Q1	0 / 3	1–3	25%
French Open	A	Q1	Q3	2R	Q2	Q1	Q2	1R	1R	0 / 3	1–3	25%
Wimbledon	Q1	Q1	2R	Q1	Q2	A	1R	2R	Q1	0 / 3	2–3	40%
US Open	Q1	2R	Q1	2R	Q1	Q1	Q3	2R	Q1	0 / 3	3–3	50%
Win–loss	0–0	1–1	2–2	2–3	0–0	0–0	0–1	2–4	0–1	0 / 12	7–12	37%
ATP Tour Masters 1000
Indian Wells	A	A	A	1R	Q1	A	A	A	A	0 / 1	0–1	0%
Miami	A	A	2R	2R	Q1	A	A	A	A	0 / 2	2–2	50%
Madrid	A	A	A	Q1	A	A	A	Q2	A	0 / 0	0–0	–
Rome	A	A	A	A	A	A	A	2R	A	0 / 1	1–1	50%
Canada	A	A	A	Q2	A	A	A	A	A	0 / 0	0–0	–
Cincinnati	A	A	Q1	1R	A	A	A	Q2	A	0 / 1	0–1	0%
Shanghai	NH	A	1R	1R	A	Q1	A	A	A	0 / 2	0–2	0%
Paris	A	A	Q1	Q1	A	A	A	A	A	0 / 0	0–0	–
Win–loss	0–0	0–0	1–2	1–4	0–0	0–0	0–0	1–1	0–0	0 / 7	3–7	30%
