= Barış Ergüden =

Turkish tennis player

- Country (sports): Turkey
- Born: 1 January 1986 (age 40) Istanbul, Turkey
- Plays: Right-handed (two-handed backhand)
- Prize money: $51,533

Singles
- Career record: 0–2 (at ATP Tour level, Grand Slam level, and in Davis Cup)
- Highest ranking: No. 520 (15 June 2015)

Doubles
- Career record: 0–1 (at ATP Tour level, Grand Slam level, and in Davis Cup)
- Career titles: 1 ITF
- Highest ranking: No. 532 (16 June 2014)

Team competitions
- Davis Cup: 8–9
- Last updated on: 17 March 2017.

Barış Ergüden (born 1 January 1986) is a Turkish tennis player.

Ergüden has a career high ATP singles ranking of 520 achieved on 15 June 2015. He also has a career high ATP doubles ranking of 532, achieved on 16 June 2014.

Ergüden has represented Turkey at Davis Cup, where he has a win–loss record of 8–9.

== Career titles ==
ATP Challenger Tour (0)
ITF Futures (1)

Date	Category	Tournament	Surface	Partner	Opponent	Score
31 May 2014	$10,000	Antalya-Belconti, Turkey F18	Hard	(Ukraine) Marat Deviatiarov	(Turkey) Cem İlkel (Turkey) Efe Yurtaçan	7–5, 6–2
