= Türk Telecom İzmir Cup =

TEB İzmir Cup

Defunct tennis tournament
- Event name: İzmir
- Location: İzmir, Turkey
- Venue: UTEM Tennis Club, Kültürpark Tenis Kulübü (2017)
- Category: ATP Challenger Tour
- Surface: Hard
- Draw: 32S/32Q/16D
- Prize money: €64,000+H
- Website: www.kptk.org

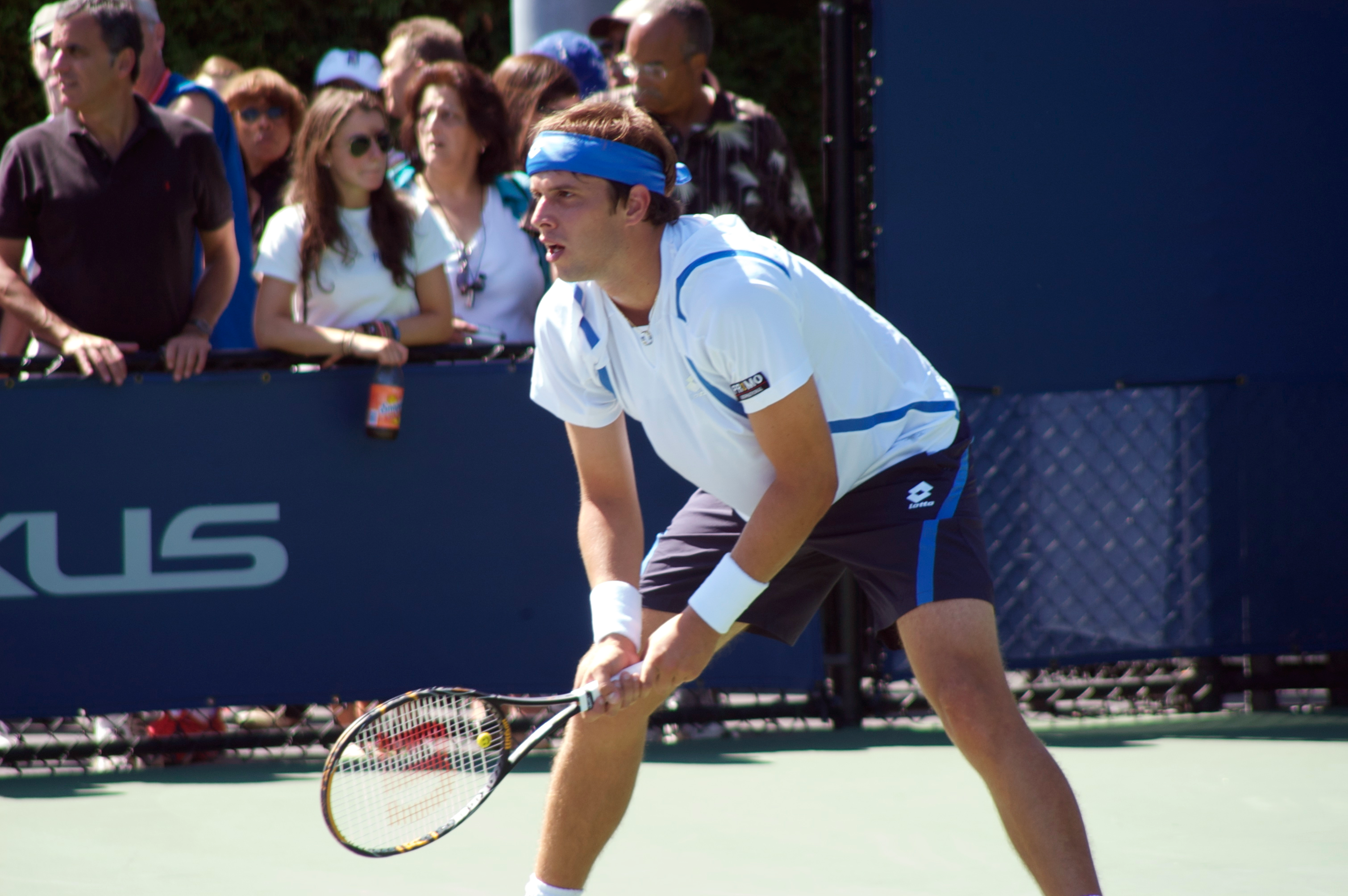
Luxembourg's Gilles Müller defeated Kristian Pless for the inaugural İzmir singles title in 2008

The TEB İzmir Cup (formerly Türk Telecom İzmir Cup in 2009-2010) was a professional tennis tournament played on outdoor hardcourts. It was part of the ATP Challenger Tour. It was held annually in İzmir, Turkey, from 2008 until 2017.

== Past finals ==
=== Singles ===
| Year | Champion | Runner-up | Score |
|---|---|---|---|
| 2017 | (Ukraine) Illya Marchenko | (France) Stéphane Robert | 7–6^{(7–2)}, 6–0 |
| 2016 | (Turkey) Marsel İlhan | (Turkey) Cem İlkel | 6–2, 6–4 |
| 2015 | (Slovakia) Lukáš Lacko | (Romania) Marius Copil | 6–3, 7–6^{(7–5)} |
| 2014 | (Croatia) Borna Ćorić | (Tunisia) Malek Jaziri | 6–1, 6–7^{(7–9)}, 6–4 |
| 2013 | (Kazakhstan) Mikhail Kukushkin | (Republic of Ireland) Louk Sorensen | 6–1, 6–4 |
| 2012 | (Russia) Dmitry Tursunov | (Ukraine) Illya Marchenko | 7–6^{(7–4)}, 6–7^{(5–7)}, 6–3 |
| 2011 | (Slovakia) Lukáš Lacko | (Turkey) Marsel İlhan | 6–4, 6–3 |
| 2010 | (India) Somdev Devvarman | (Turkey) Marsel İlhan | 6–4, 6–3 |
| 2009 | (Italy) Andrea Stoppini | (Turkey) Marsel İlhan | 7–6(5), 6–2 |
| 2008 | (Luxembourg) Gilles Müller | (Denmark) Kristian Pless | 7–5, 6–3 |

=== Doubles ===
| Year | Champions | Runners-up | Score |
|---|---|---|---|
| 2017 | (United Kingdom) Scott Clayton (United Kingdom) Jonny O'Mara | (Ukraine) Denys Molchanov (Ukraine) Sergiy Stakhovsky | Walkover |
| 2016 | (Switzerland) Marco Chiudinelli (Romania) Marius Copil | (France) Sadio Doumbia (France) Calvin Hemery | 6–4, 6–4 |
| 2015 | (India) Saketh Myneni (India) Divij Sharan | (Tunisia) Malek Jaziri (Ukraine) Denys Molchanov | 7–6^{(7–5)}, 4–6, 0–0 ret. |
| 2014 | (United Kingdom) Ken Skupski (United Kingdom) Neal Skupski | (Tunisia) Malek Jaziri (Russia) Alexander Kudryavtsev | 6–1, 6–4 |
| 2013 | (United States) Austin Krajicek (United States) Tennys Sandgren | (United Kingdom) Brydan Klein (Australia) Dane Propoggia | 7–6^{(7–4)}, 6–4 |
| 2012 | (United Kingdom) David Rice (United Kingdom) Sean Thornley | (Australia) Brydan Klein (Australia) Dane Propoggia | 7–6^{(10–8)}, 6–2 |
| 2011 | (United States) Travis Rettenmaier (Germany) Simon Stadler | (Italy) Flavio Cipolla (Italy) Thomas Fabbiano | 6–0, 6–2 |
| 2010 | (Australia) Rameez Junaid (Germany) Frank Moser | (United Kingdom) Jamie Delgado (United Kingdom) Jonathan Marray | 6–2, 6–4 |
| 2009 | (Israel) Jonathan Erlich (Israel) Harel Levy | (India) Prakash Amritraj (United States) Rajeev Ram | 6–3, 6–3 |
| 2008 | (United States) Jesse Levine (Japan) Kei Nishikori | (United States) Nathan Thompson (Thailand) Danai Udomchoke | 6–1, 7–5 |
