= 2010 Fergana Challenger – Doubles =

Doubles
- 2010 Fergana Challenger

Final
- Champion: (United States) Brendan Evans (Japan) Toshihide Matsui
- Runner-up: (China) Gong Maoxin (China) Li Zhe
- Score: 3–6, 6–3, [10–8]

Events
Singles	Doubles
← 2009 ·	Fergana Challenger	· 2011 →

Pavel Chekhov and Alexey Kedryuk were the defending champions, but Chekhov chose not to compete this year.
Kedryuk partnered up with Michail Elgin, but they lost in the first round against Andis Juška and Artem Sitak.
Brendan Evans and Toshihide Matsui won in the final 3–6, 6–3, [10–8] against Gong Maoxin and Li Zhe.

== Seeds ==
1. (Russia) Michail Elgin / (Kazakhstan) Alexey Kedryuk (first round)
2. (Canada) Pierre-Ludovic Duclos / (Chinese Taipei) Yang Tsung-hua (first round)
3. (Australia) Sadik Kadir / (India) Purav Raja (quarterfinals)
4. (Russia) Evgeny Kirillov / (Russia) Alexandre Kudryavtsev (semifinals)

== Draw ==
=== Key ===
- Q = Qualifier
- WC = Wild card
- LL = Lucky loser
- Alt = Alternate
- SE = Special exempt
- PR = Protected ranking
- ITF = ITF entry
- JE = Junior exempt
- w/o = Walkover
- r = Retired
- d = Defaulted
- SR = Special ranking

=== Draw ===
First round
1	(Russia) M Elgin (Kazakhstan) A Kedryuk	4	6^{3}
(Latvia) A Juška (Russia) A Sitak	6	7
WC	(Uzbekistan) P Babadjanov (Uzbekistan) J Khaydarov	1	0
(China) D Wu (China) Z Zhang	6	6
3	(Australia) S Kadir (India) P Raja	6	6
(India) D Sharan (India) V Vardhan	3	4
WC	(Uzbekistan) B Kamiljanov (Russia) I Starkov	3	5
(China) M Gong (China) Z Li	6	7
(Slovakia) I Klec (Slovakia) A Martin	2	2
(Ukraine) S Bubka (Ukraine) D Molchanov	6	6
(Uzbekistan) S Fayziev (Uzbekistan) A Saidmukhamedov	2	3
4	(Russia) E Kirillov (Russia) A Kudryavtsev	6	6
(Uzbekistan) M Inoyatov (Uzbekistan) V Uzakov	5	4
(Czech Republic) T Cakl (Uzbekistan) F Dustov	7	6
(United States) B Evans (Japan) T Matsui	7	6
2	(Canada) P-L Duclos (Chinese Taipei) T-h Yang	5	2

Quarterfinals
(Latvia) A Juška (Russia) A Sitak	6	3	[10]
(China) D Wu (China) Z Zhang	3	6	[5]
3	(Australia) S Kadir (India) P Raja	2	4
(China) M Gong (China) Z Li	6	6
(Ukraine) S Bubka (Ukraine) D Molchanov	2	6^{4}
4	(Russia) E Kirillov (Russia) A Kudryavtsev	6	7
(Czech Republic) T Cakl (Uzbekistan) F Dustov	3	3
(United States) B Evans (Japan) T Matsui	6	6

Semifinals
(Latvia) A Juška (Russia) A Sitak	3	1
(China) M Gong (China) Z Li	6	6
4	(Russia) E Kirillov (Russia) A Kudryavtsev	1	2
(United States) B Evans (Japan) T Matsui	6	6

Finals
(China) M Gong (China) Z Li	6	3	[8]
(United States) B Evans (Japan) T Matsui	3	6	[10]
