= 2009 Fergana Challenger – Singles =

Singles
- 2009 Fergana Challenger

Final
- Champion: (Slovakia) Lukáš Lacko
- Runner-up: (Australia) Samuel Groth
- Score: 4–6, 7–5, 7–6(4)

Events
Singles	Doubles
- Fergana Challenger

Pavel Šnobel was the defender of title; however, he lost to Evgeny Kirillov in the first round.
Lukáš Lacko became the new champion, after he beat Samuel Groth in the final (4–6, 7–5, 7–6(4)).

== Seeds ==
1. (Thailand) Danai Udomchoke (quarterfinals)
2. (Czech Republic) Pavel Šnobel (first round)
3. (Russia) Alexander Kudryavtsev (quarterfinals)
4. (Ukraine) Illya Marchenko (semifinals)
5. (Australia) Samuel Groth (final)
6. (Russia) Konstantin Kravchuk (first round)
7. (Slovakia) Kamil Čapkovič (first round)
8. (Slovakia) Lukáš Lacko (champion)

== Draw ==
Key

- Q = Qualifier
- WC = Wild card
- LL = Lucky loser
- Alt = Alternate
- ITF = ITF entry
- PR = Protected ranking
- SR = Special ranking
- SE = Special exempt
- JE = Junior exempt
- JR = Junior Accelerator Programme entrant
- CO = College Accelerator Programme entrant
- NG = Next Gen Accelerator Program entrant
- w/o = Walkover
- r = Retired
- d = Defaulted

=== Final four ===
Semifinals
8	(Slovakia) Lukáš Lacko	6	5	6
4	(Ukraine) Illya Marchenko	2	7	1
5	(Australia) Samuel Groth	6	6
Q	(Russia) Evgeny Kirillov	2	3

Final
8	(Slovakia) Lukáš Lacko	4	7	7
5	(Australia) Samuel Groth	6	5	6^{4}

=== Top half ===
First round
1	(Thailand) D Udomchoke	6	6
(Russia) I Belyaev	2	1
(Japan) Y Sugita	4	2
(Czech Republic) D Lojda	6	6
WC	(Uzbekistan) V Uzakov	2	2
(South Africa) R Klaasen	6	6
(Slovakia) M Semjan	6	1	5
8	(Slovakia) L Lacko	4	6	7
4	(Ukraine) I Marchenko	6	6
WC	(Uzbekistan) S Shipilov	3	3
WC	(Uzbekistan) R Biktyakov	6	3	2
(Pakistan) A-u-H Qureshi	4	6	6
(Chinese Taipei) T Chen	2	6	6
Q	(India) P Raja	6	1	2
(Canada) P-L Duclos	7	7
7	(Slovakia) K Čapkovič	6^{6}	6^{2}

Second round
1	(Thailand) D Udomchoke	6	6
(Czech Republic) D Lojda	4	2
(South Africa) R Klaasen	7	2	3
8	(Slovakia) L Lacko	6^{5}	6	6
4	(Ukraine) I Marchenko	5	6	6
(Pakistan) A-u-H Qureshi	7	4	2
(Chinese Taipei) T Chen	2	4
(Canada) P-L Duclos	6	6

Quarterfinals
1	(Thailand) D Udomchoke	1	1
8	(Slovakia) L Lacko	6	6
4	(Ukraine) I Marchenko	6	3	6
(Canada) P-L Duclos	3	6	1

Semifinals
8	(Slovakia) L Lacko	6	5	6
4	(Ukraine) I Marchenko	2	7	1

=== Bottom half ===
First round
5	(Australia) S Groth	7	6
(Moldova) A Gorban	6^{0}	4
(Ukraine) I Sergeyev	4	6	6^{0}
WC	(Uzbekistan) M Inoyatov	6	1	7
(Kazakhstan) A Kedryuk	2	4
(Netherlands) B Westerhof	6	6
(Russia) P Chekhov	4	1
3	(Russia) A Kudryavtsev	6	6
6	(Russia) K Kravchuk	4	3
(South Korea) W-S Jun	6	6
(Japan) J Mitsuhashi	5	6	3
Q	(Russia) A Sitak	7	1	6
(United Kingdom) C Eaton	3	5
Q	(Thailand) K Wachiramanowong	6	7
Q	(Russia) E Kirillov	1	6	7
2	(Czech Republic) P Šnobel	6	3	5

Second round
5	(Australia) S Groth	6	6
WC	(Uzbekistan) M Inoyatov	3	2
(Netherlands) B Westerhof	3	4
3	(Russia) A Kudryavtsev	6	6
(South Korea) W-S Jun	6	1	3
Q	(Russia) A Sitak	4	6	6
Q	(Thailand) K Wachiramanowong	6	0	3
Q	(Russia) E Kirillov	3	6	6

Quarterfinals
5	(Australia) S Groth	4	7	6
3	(Russia) A Kudryavtsev	6	6^{1}	2
Q	(Russia) A Sitak	1	2
Q	(Russia) E Kirillov	6	6

Semifinals
5	(Australia) S Groth	6	6
Q	(Russia) E Kirillov	2	3
