= 2009 Almaty Cup – Singles =

Singles
- 2009 Almaty Cup

Final
- Champion: (Ukraine) Ivan Sergeyev
- Runner-up: (Jamaica) Dustin Brown
- Score: 6–3, 5–7, 6–4

Events
Singles	Doubles
- Almaty Cup

Sebastián Decoud was the defending champion, but he chose to not compete this year.
Ivan Sergeyev defeated Dustin Brown 6–3, 5–7, 6–4 in the final.

== Seeds ==
1. (Russia) Mikhail Elgin (first round)
2. (Slovakia) Kamil Čapkovič (first round)
3. (Ukraine) Ivan Sergeyev (champion)
4. (Jamaica) Dustin Brown (final)
5. (Latvia) Andis Juška (quarterfinals)
6. (Japan) Junn Mitsuhashi (first round)
7. (Australia) Greg Jones (quarterfinals)
8. (Latvia) Deniss Pavlovs (first round)

== Draw ==
Key

- Q = Qualifier
- WC = Wild card
- LL = Lucky loser
- Alt = Alternate
- ITF = ITF entry
- PR = Protected ranking
- SR = Special ranking
- SE = Special exempt
- JE = Junior exempt
- JR = Junior Accelerator Programme entrant
- CO = College Accelerator Programme entrant
- NG = Next Gen Accelerator Program entrant
- w/o = Walkover
- r = Retired
- d = Defaulted

=== Final four ===
Semifinals
(Canada) Pierre-Ludovic Duclos	6^{3}	6^{3}
3	(Ukraine) Ivan Sergeyev	7	7
4	(Jamaica) Dustin Brown	2	6	6
(Russia) Ilya Belyaev	6	2	4

Final
3	(Ukraine) Ivan Sergeyev	6	5	6
4	(Jamaica) Dustin Brown	3	7	4

=== Top half ===
First round
1	(Russia) M Elgin	3	6	3
(Canada) P-L Duclos	6	3	6
Q	(Republic of Ireland) J McGee	2	6	6
(Romania) P-A Luncanu	6	3	4
(Japan) T Matsui	3	5
Q	(Ukraine) D Molchanov	6	7
(Chinese Taipei) T-h Yang	5	5
7	(Australia) G Jones	7	7
3	(Ukraine) I Sergeyev	6^{5}	7	7
(Kazakhstan) A Kedryuk	7	5	5
WC	(Kazakhstan) A Rakhishev	3	1
(France) M Rodrigues	6	6
(Austria) R Eitzinger	6	2	4
(Chinese Taipei) T Chen	1	6	6
(Russia) K Kravchuk	6	6
8	(Latvia) D Pavlovs	3	3

Second round
(Canada) P-L Duclos	7	6
Q	(Republic of Ireland) J McGee	5	4
Q	(Ukraine) D Molchanov	6^{2}	2
7	(Australia) G Jones	7	6
3	(Ukraine) I Sergeyev	7	6
(France) M Rodrigues	5	1
(Chinese Taipei) T Chen	4	6	3
(Russia) K Kravchuk	6	3	6

Quarterfinals
(Canada) P-L Duclos	6	7
7	(Australia) G Jones	2	5
3	(Ukraine) I Sergeyev	6	7
(Russia) K Kravchuk	4	6^{2}

Semifinals
(Canada) P-L Duclos	6^{3}	6^{3}
3	(Ukraine) I Sergeyev	7	7

=== Bottom half ===
First round
6	(Japan) J Mitsuhashi	4	1
Q	(Russia) M Ledovskikh	6	6
Q	(Australia) S Kadir	7	6
WC	(Kazakhstan) D Braun	6^{3}	4
(Spain) G Alcaide	6	6^{5}	7
(Slovakia) M Semjan	4	7	6^{2}
(Belgium) D Goffin	7	2	6^{2}
4	(Jamaica) D Brown	5	6	7
5	(Latvia) A Juška	6	7
(New Zealand) J Statham	4	6^{4}
(France) J-N Insausti	2	6	7
WC	(Kazakhstan) S Abdukhalikov	6	1	6^{5}
WC	(Kazakhstan) S Yessenbekov	1	1
(Republic of Ireland) L Sorensen	6	6
(Russia) I Belyaev	6	6
2	(Slovakia) K Čapkovič	4	4

Second round
Q	(Russia) M Ledovskikh	7	6
Q	(Australia) S Kadir	6^{4}	4
(Spain) G Alcaide	3	2
4	(Jamaica) D Brown	6	6
5	(Latvia) A Juška	6	5	6
(France) J-N Insausti	2	7	2
(Republic of Ireland) L Sorensen	3	7	6^{5}
(Russia) I Belyaev	6	5	7

Quarterfinals
Q	(Russia) M Ledovskikh	6	4	0
4	(Jamaica) D Brown	4	6	6
5	(Latvia) A Juška	3	2
(Russia) I Belyaev	6	6

Semifinals
4	(Jamaica) D Brown	2	6	6
(Russia) I Belyaev	6	2	4
