= 2009 Caversham International Tennis Tournament – Singles =

Singles
- 2009 Caversham International Tennis Tournament

Final
- Champion: (Finland) Jarkko Nieminen
- Runner-up: (France) Stéphane Robert
- Score: 4–6, 6–1, 7–5

Events
Singles	Doubles
- Caversham International Tennis Tournament

Adrian Mannarino, who was the defending champion, chose to not compete this year.
Jarkko Nieminen won in the final match 4–6, 6–1, 7–5, against Stéphane Robert.

== Seeds ==
1. (Germany) Florian Mayer (second round)
2. (Slovakia) Karol Beck (first round)
3. (France) Stéphane Robert (final)
4. (Finland) Jarkko Nieminen (champion)
5. (Switzerland) Stéphane Bohli (second round)
6. (Switzerland) Michael Lammer (second round)
7. (United Kingdom) Alex Bogdanović (first round)
8. (Romania) Adrian Ungur (first round)

== Draw ==
Key

- Q = Qualifier
- WC = Wild card
- LL = Lucky loser
- Alt = Alternate
- ITF = ITF entry
- PR = Protected ranking
- SR = Special ranking
- SE = Special exempt
- JE = Junior exempt
- JR = Junior Accelerator Programme entrant
- CO = College Accelerator Programme entrant
- NG = Next Gen Accelerator Program entrant
- w/o = Walkover
- r = Retired
- d = Defaulted

=== Finals ===
Semifinals
(Germany) Tobias Kamke	7	2	3
4	(Finland) Jarkko Nieminen	6^{7}	6	6
3	(France) Stéphane Robert	7	6
Q	(Netherlands) Robin Haase	5	2

Final
4	(Finland) Jarkko Nieminen	4	6	7
3	(France) Stéphane Robert	6	1	5

=== Top half ===
First round
1	(Germany) F Mayer	6	5	7
Q	(United Kingdom) D Cox	1	7	6^{1}
(Germany) T Kamke	6	6
(United Kingdom) J Goodall	3	4
(Denmark) F Nielsen	0	6	6
WC	(United Kingdom) C Fleming	6	4	2
(Belgium) D Goffin	7	6
8	(Romania) A Ungur	6^{3}	1
4	(Finland) J Nieminen	6	6
(Czech Republic) J Minář	1	2
(United Kingdom) D Evans	6	6
(Austria) M Fischer	3	3
Q	(Finland) H Kontinen	2	6	6
(Switzerland) G Bastl	6	2	2
(Austria) P Oswald	4	6^{6}
5	(Switzerland) S Bohli	6	7

Second round
1	(Germany) F Mayer	3	4
(Germany) T Kamke	6	6
(Denmark) F Nielsen	6	6
(Belgium) D Goffin	4	1
4	(Finland) J Nieminen	6	6
(United Kingdom) D Evans	4	2
Q	(Finland) H Kontinen	7	6
5	(Switzerland) S Bohli	6^{2}	1

Quarterfinals
(Germany) T Kamke	6	6^{7}	6
(Denmark) F Nielsen	2	7	4
4	(Finland) J Nieminen	6	6
Q	(Finland) H Kontinen	4	4

Semifinal
(Germany) T Kamke	7	2	3
4	(Finland) J Nieminen	6^{7}	6	6

=== Bottom half ===
First round
6	(Switzerland) M Lammer	7	6
(Italy) D Bracciali	5	3
(Belgium) Y Mertens	6^{5}	6	6
WC	(United Kingdom) D Rice	7	2	3
WC	(United Kingdom) James Marsalek	6^{4}	0
Q	(Switzerland) R Valent	7	6
(Canada) P-L Duclos	3	4
3	(France) S Robert	6	6
7	(United Kingdom) A Bogdanovic	4	2
Q	(Netherlands) R Haase	6	6
(Italy) S Galvani	6	6
(Italy) A Stoppini	2	1
(Czech Republic) D Lojda	6^{3}	2
WC	(United Kingdom) D Smethurst	7	6
(Belarus) U Ignatik	6	7
2	(Slovakia) K Beck	4	6^{5}

Second round
6	(Switzerland) M Lammer	1	3
(Belgium) Y Mertens	6	6
(Switzerland) R Valent	1	0	r
3	(France) S Robert	6	2
Q	(Netherlands) R Haase
(Italy) S Galvani	w/o
WC	(United Kingdom) D Smethurst	6^{3}	4
(Belarus) U Ignatik	7	6

Quarterfinals
(Belgium) Y Mertens	2	7	4
3	(France) S Robert	6	6	6
Q	(Netherlands) R Haase	7	6
(Belarus) U Ignatik	6^{5}	3

Semifinal
3	(France) S Robert	7	6
Q	(Netherlands) R Haase	5	2
