= 2012 Fergana Challenger – Singles =

Singles
- 2012 Fergana Challenger

Final
- Champion: (India) Yuki Bhambri
- Runner-up: (Israel) Amir Weintraub
- Score: 6–3, 6–3

Events
| Singles | Doubles |
| ← 2011 · | Fergana Challenger | · 2013 → |

Dudi Sela was the defending champion but decided not to participate.
Yuki Bhambri won the title defeating Amir Weintraub in the final 6–3, 6–3.

== Seeds ==
1. (Slovakia) Karol Beck (withdrew due to a pulled muscle)
2. (Switzerland) Marco Chiudinelli (second round)
3. (South Africa) Izak van der Merwe (first round)
4. (Israel) Amir Weintraub (final)
5. (Russia) Konstantin Kravchuk (second round)
6. (Chinese Taipei) Jimmy Wang (first round)
7. (United Kingdom) Jamie Baker (first round)
8. (Ukraine) Denys Molchanov (semifinals)
9. (Uzbekistan) Farrukh Dustov (quarterfinals)

== Draw ==
=== Key ===
- Q = Qualifier
- WC = Wild card
- LL = Lucky loser
- Alt = Alternate
- SE = Special exempt
- PR = Protected ranking
- ITF = ITF entry
- JE = Junior exempt
- w/o = Walkover
- r = Retired
- d = Defaulted
- SR = Special ranking

=== Finals ===
Semifinals
8 | (Ukraine) Denys Molchanov | 6 | 3 | 3
(India) Yuki Bhambri | 3 | 6 | 6
4 | (Israel) Amir Weintraub | 6 | 6
(Russia) Evgeny Kirillov | 3 | 4

Final
(India) Yuki Bhambri | 6 | 6
4 | (Israel) Amir Weintraub | 3 | 3

=== Top half ===
First round
9 | (Uzbekistan) F Dustov | 6 | 6
Q | (Uzbekistan) Batyr Sapaev | 2 | 3
(Russia) A Kumantsov | 6 | 3 | 3
(Russia) D Matsukevich | 4 | 6 | 6
Q | (Kyrgyzstan) D Duldaev | 3 | 6 | 6
WC | (Uzbekistan) S Ikramov | 6 | 3 | 4
WC | (Uzbekistan) Nigmat Shofayziev | 1 | 2
8 | (Ukraine) D Molchanov | 6 | 6
3 | (South Africa) I van der Merwe | 4 | 5
WC | (Uzbekistan) M Inoyatov | 6 | 7
(India) Y Bhambri | 6 | 6
(Czech Republic) Michal Konečný | 3 | 1
Q | (Russia) M Ledovskikh | 6 | 6
(Ukraine) I Marchenko | 3 | 2
(Czech Republic) J Minář | 6 | 7^{7}
6 | (Chinese Taipei) J Wang | 4 | 6^{4}

Second round
9 | (Uzbekistan) F Dustov | 7^{7} | 6
(Russia) D Matsukevitch | 6^{5} | 1
Q | (Kyrgyzstan) D Duldaev | 6^{3} | 1
8 | (Ukraine) D Molchanov | 7^{7} | 6
WC | (Uzbekistan) M Inoyatov | 2 | 0
(India) Y Bhambri | 6 | 6
Q | (Russia) M Ledovskikh | 6 | 7^{7}
(Czech Republic) J Minář | 3 | 6^{1}

Quarterfinals
9 | (Uzbekistan) F Dustov | 4 | 4
8 | (Ukraine) D Molchanov | 6 | 6
(India) Y Bhambri | 6 | 1 | 7^{7}
Q | (Russia) M Ledovskikh | 3 | 6 | 6^{5}

Semifinals
8 | (Ukraine) D Molchanov | 6 | 3 | 3
(India) Y Bhambri | 3 | 6 | 6

=== Bottom half ===
First round
5 | (Russia) K Kravchuk | 7^{7} | 6
(Belarus) U Ignatik | 6^{5} | 3
(Australia) B Klein | 6 | 6^{5} | 6
LL | (Georgia (country)) Nikoloz Basilashvili | 4 | 7^{7} | 4
(South Africa) R Klaasen | 6^{5} | 7^{7} | 6^{2}
(Austria) N Moser | 7^{7} | 6^{4} | 7^{7}
(Japan) Yasutaka Uchiyama | 6^{3} | 6^{7}
4 | (Israel) A Weintraub | 7^{7} | 7^{9}
7 | (United Kingdom) J Baker | 6 | 6^{1} | 4
(India) V Vardhan | 4 | 7^{7} | 6
(Russia) E Kirillov | 6 | 6
(Russia) Ervand Gasparyan | 1 | 3
(Italy) R Ghedin | 3 | 7^{7} | 6
Q | (Uzbekistan) V Uzakov | 6 | 6^{4} | 4
WC | (Uzbekistan) Sergey Shipilov | 1 | 4
2 | (Switzerland) M Chiudinelli | 6 | 6

Second round
5 | (Russia) K Kravchuk | 6 | 6^{3} | 0
(Australia) B Klein | 4 | 7^{7} | 6
(Austria) N Moser | 4 | 5
4 | (Israel) A Weintraub | 6 | 7
(India) V Vardhan | 6 | 2 | 4
(Russia) E Kirillov | 4 | 6 | 6
(Italy) R Ghedin | 7 | 1 | 6
2 | (Switzerland) M Chiudinelli | 5 | 6 | 4

Quarterfinals
(Australia) B Klein | 7 | 4 | 1
4 | (Israel) A Weintraub | 5 | 6 | 6
(Russia) E Kirillov | 5 | 6 | 6
(Italy) R Ghedin | 7 | 2 | 3

Semifinals
4 | (Israel) A Weintraub | 6 | 6
(Russia) E Kirillov | 3 | 4
