= 2009 Caversham International Tennis Tournament – Doubles =

Doubles
- 2009 Caversham International Tennis Tournament

Final
- Champions: (Denmark) Frederik Nielsen (Australia) Joseph Sirianni
- Runners-up: (Finland) Henri Kontinen (Finland) Jarkko Nieminen
- Score: 7–5, 3–6, [10–2]

Events
| Singles | Doubles |
| ← 2008 · | Caversham International Tennis Tournament | · 2010 → |

Colin Fleming and Ken Skupski were the defending champions, but they lost to Henri Kontinen and Jarkko Nieminen in the final.
The Finnish pair reached the final, where they lost to 4th seeds Frederik Nielsen and Joseph Sirianni 5–7, 6–3, [2–10].

== Seeds ==
1. (United Kingdom) Colin Fleming / (United Kingdom) Ken Skupski (first round)
2. (United States) David Martin / (Netherlands) Rogier Wassen (first round)
3. (Switzerland) George Bastl / (United Kingdom) Jonathan Marray (quarterfinals, withdrew)
4. (Denmark) Frederik Nielsen / (Australia) Joseph Sirianni (champions)

== Draw ==
=== Key ===
- Q = Qualifier
- WC = Wild card
- LL = Lucky loser
- Alt = Alternate
- SE = Special exempt
- PR = Protected ranking
- ITF = ITF entry
- JE = Junior exempt
- w/o = Walkover
- r = Retired
- d = Defaulted
- SR = Special ranking

=== Draw ===
First round
1 | (United Kingdom) C Fleming (United Kingdom) K Skupski | 4 | 6^{4}
(Finland) H Kontinen (Finland) J Nieminen | 6 | 7
WC | (United Kingdom) N Pauffley (United Kingdom) A Ward | 6 | 3 | [10]
(United Kingdom) D Evans (United Kingdom) J Milton | 4 | 6 | [8]
3 | (Switzerland) G Bastl (United Kingdom) J Marray | 6 | 6
(Belgium) Y Mertens (France) S Robert | 3 | 2
WC | (United Kingdom) James Marsalek (United Kingdom) D Rice | 1 | 2
(Canada) P-L Duclos (United Kingdom) J Goodall | 6 | 6
(France) O Charroin (United Kingdom) C Eaton | 6 | 6
(Italy) D Bracciali (Italy) S Galvani | 1 | 4
(United Kingdom) D Cox (United Kingdom) A Slabinsky | 3 | 2
4 | (Denmark) F Nielsen (Australia) J Sirianni | 6 | 6
WC | (United Kingdom) D Smethurst (United Kingdom) M Willis | 6 | 6
(Germany) T Kamke (Czech Republic) D Lojda | 2 | 2
Alt | (Germany) F Mayer (Germany) T Summerer | 6 | 6
2 | (United States) D Martin (Netherlands) R Wassen | 1 | 1

Quarterfinals
(Finland) H Kontinen (Finland) J Nieminen | 6 | 6
WC | (United Kingdom) N Pauffley (United Kingdom) A Ward | 4 | 2
3 | (Switzerland) G Bastl (United Kingdom) J Marray | w/o
(Canada) P-L Duclos (United Kingdom) J Goodall
(France) O Charroin (United Kingdom) C Eaton | 6^{10} | 5
4 | (Denmark) F Nielsen (Australia) J Sirianni | 7 | 7
WC | (United Kingdom) D Smethurst (United Kingdom) M Willis | 2 | 6 | [11]
Alt | (Germany) F Mayer (Germany) T Summerer | 6 | 1 | [9]

Semifinals
(Finland) H Kontinen (Finland) J Nieminen | 6^{1} | 6 | [10]
(Canada) P-L Duclos (United Kingdom) J Goodall | 7 | 1 | [5]
4 | (Denmark) F Nielsen (Australia) J Sirianni | 6 | 6
WC | (United Kingdom) D Smethurst (United Kingdom) M Willis | 1 | 2

Final
(Finland) H Kontinen (Finland) J Nieminen | 5 | 6 | [2]
4 | (Denmark) F Nielsen (Australia) J Sirianni | 7 | 3 | [10]
