= 2012 Fergana Challenger – Doubles =

Doubles
- 2012 Fergana Challenger

Final
- Champions: (South Africa) Raven Klaasen (South Africa) Izak van der Merwe
- Runners-up: (Thailand) Sanchai Ratiwatana (Thailand) Sonchat Ratiwatana
- Score: 6–3, 6–4

Events
Singles	Doubles
← 2011 ·	Fergana Challenger	· 2013 →

John Paul Fruttero and Raven Klaasen are the defending champions, but they did not partner up together.
Fruttero partnered up with Uladzimir Ignatik but lost in the semifinals to Klaasen who played alongside Izak van der Merwe and successfully defended his title, defeating Sanchai Ratiwatana and Sonchat Ratiwatana in the final 6–3, 6–4.

== Seeds ==
1. (Thailand) Sanchai Ratiwatana / (Thailand) Sonchat Ratiwatana (final)
2. (South Africa) Raven Klaasen / (South Africa) Izak van der Merwe (champions)
3. (United States) John Paul Fruttero / (Belarus) Uladzimir Ignatik (semifinals)
4. (India) Purav Raja / (India) Divij Sharan (quarterfinals)

== Draw ==
=== Key ===
- Q = Qualifier
- WC = Wild card
- LL = Lucky loser
- Alt = Alternate
- SE = Special exempt
- PR = Protected ranking
- ITF = ITF entry
- JE = Junior exempt
- w/o = Walkover
- r = Retired
- d = Defaulted
- SR = Special ranking

=== Draw ===
First round
1	(Thailand) Sa Ratiwatana (Thailand) So Ratiwatana	6	6
(Russia) D Matsukevitch (Israel) A Weintraub	2	2
(Japan) Yasutaka Uchiyama (Chinese Taipei) J Wang	6	6
WC	(Uzbekistan) Bobur Kamiljanov (Uzbekistan) Nigmat Shofayziev	2	2
4	(India) P Raja (India) D Sharan	6	6
WC	(Uzbekistan) Abduvoris Saitmukhamedov (Uzbekistan) Sergey Shipilov	2	0
(India) Y Bhambri (India) V Vardhan	1	7^{7}	[12]
(Russia) K Kravchuk (Ukraine) D Molchanov	6	6^{3}	[10]
(Russia) E Kirillov (Belarus) Andrei Vasilevski	2	6	[6]
WC	(Uzbekistan) Rifat Biktyakov (Uzbekistan) M Inoyatov	6	3	[10]
(Australia) B Klein (Czech Republic) Michal Konečný	3	2
3	(United States) JP Fruttero (Belarus) U Ignatik	6	6
(Italy) R Ghedin (Austria) N Moser	6	7
(Russia) Nikoloz Basilashvili (Ukraine) Vladyslav Manafov	3	5
(Uzbekistan) S Ikramov (Uzbekistan) V Uzakov	6^{0}	3
2	(South Africa) R Klaasen (South Africa) I van der Merwe	7^{7}	6

Quarterfinals
1	(Thailand) Sa Ratiwatana (Thailand) So Ratiwatana	6	6
(Japan) Yasutaka Uchiyama (Chinese Taipei) J Wang	1	4
4	(India) P Raja (India) D Sharan	6^{5}	1
(India) Y Bhambri (India) V Vardhan	7^{7}	6
WC	(Uzbekistan) Rifat Biktyakov (Uzbekistan) M Inoyatov	3	6	[5]
3	(United States) JP Fruttero (Belarus) U Ignatik	6	4	[10]
(Italy) R Ghedin (Austria) N Moser	3	4
2	(South Africa) R Klaasen (South Africa) I van der Merwe	6	6

Semifinals
1	(Thailand) Sa Ratiwatana (Thailand) So Ratiwatana	6	6
(India) Y Bhambri (India) V Vardhan	4	4
3	(United States) JP Fruttero (Belarus) U Ignatik	4	6^{2}
2	(South Africa) R Klaasen (South Africa) I van der Merwe	6	7^{7}

Finals
1	(Thailand) Sa Ratiwatana (Thailand) So Ratiwatana	3	4
2	(South Africa) R Klaasen (South Africa) I van der Merwe	6	6
