= 2013 Fergana Challenger – Women's doubles =

Women's doubles
- 2013 Fergana Challenger

Final
- Champions: (Ukraine) Lyudmyla Kichenok (Belarus) Polina Pekhova
- Runners-up: (Slovakia) Michaela Hončová (Ukraine) Veronika Kapshay
- Score: 6–4, 6–2

Events
Singles	men	women
Doubles	men	women
← 2012 ·	Fergana Challenger	· 2014 →

Lyudmyla and Nadiya Kichenok were the defending champions, having won the event in 2012, but Nadiya chose not to participate. Her sister Lyudmyla partnered up with Polina Pekhova as the first seeds.

Lyudmyla Kichenok and Pekhova won the title, defeating Michaela Hončová and Veronika Kapshay in the final, 6–4, 6–2.

== Seeds ==
1. (Ukraine) Lyudmyla Kichenok / (Belarus) Polina Pekhova (champions)
2. (Slovakia) Michaela Hončová / (Ukraine) Veronika Kapshay (final)
3. (Uzbekistan) Nigina Abduraimova / (Kyrgyzstan) Ksenia Palkina (first round)
4. (Uzbekistan) Albina Khabibulina / (Ukraine) Anastasiya Vasylyeva (first round)

== Draw ==
=== Key ===
- Q = Qualifier
- WC = Wild card
- LL = Lucky loser
- Alt = Alternate
- SE = Special exempt
- PR = Protected ranking
- ITF = ITF entry
- JE = Junior exempt
- w/o = Walkover
- r = Retired
- d = Defaulted
- SR = Special ranking

First round
1	(Ukraine) L Kichenok (Belarus) P Pekhova	7	6
(Ukraine) O Korashvili (Uzbekistan) S Sharipova	5	0
WC	(Uzbekistan) J Sadykzhanova (Uzbekistan) S Saidhujaeva	3	4
(Uzbekistan) A Mukhametshina (Uzbekistan) G Yusupova	6	6
4	(Uzbekistan) A Khabibulina (Ukraine) A Vasylyeva	5	4
(Japan) E Takao (Japan) M Tanaka	7	6
WC	(Uzbekistan) G Muhammadsidikova (Uzbekistan) S Tuhtamatova	0	3
(Uzbekistan) P Merenkova (Japan) Y Miyazaki	6	6
(Uzbekistan) A Folts (United States) A Riley	1	4
(India) N Chilumula (Russia) A Smolina	6	6
(Turkey) B Eraydın (Turkey) M Sezer	7^{7}	7^{7}
3	(Uzbekistan) N Abduraimova (Kyrgyzstan) K Palkina	6^{3}	6^{1}
(Israel) D Khazaniuk (India) A Raina	6	6
(Russia) A Grigoryan (Russia) T Grigoryan	2	2
WC	(Uzbekistan) M Khatamova (Uzbekistan) A Stakhanova	0	0
2	(Slovakia) M Hončová (Ukraine) V Kapshay	6	6

Quarterfinals
1	(Ukraine) L Kichenok (Belarus) P Pekhova	6	6
(Uzbekistan) A Mukhametshina (Uzbekistan) G Yusupova	0	1
(Japan) E Takao (Japan) M Tanaka	6	6
(Uzbekistan) P Merenkova (Japan) Y Miyazaki	2	2
(India) N Chilumula (Russia) A Smolina	2	2
(Turkey) B Eraydın (Turkey) M Sezer	6	6
(Israel) D Khazaniuk (India) A Raina	2	6	[7]
2	(Slovakia) M Hončová (Ukraine) V Kapshay	6	4	[10]

Semifinals
1	(Ukraine) L Kichenok (Belarus) P Pekhova	6	6
(Japan) E Takao (Japan) M Tanaka	1	3
(Turkey) B Eraydın (Turkey) M Sezer	3	3
2	(Slovakia) M Hončová (Ukraine) V Kapshay	6	6

Final
1	(Ukraine) L Kichenok (Belarus) P Pekhova	6	6
2	(Slovakia) M Hončová (Ukraine) V Kapshay	4	2
