= 2009 Almaty Cup – Doubles =

Doubles
- 2009 Almaty Cup

Final
- Champions: (Ukraine) Denys Molchanov (Chinese Taipei) Yang Tsung-hua
- Runners-up: (Canada) Pierre-Ludovic Duclos (Kazakhstan) Alexey Kedryuk
- Score: 4–6, 7–6(5), [11–9]

Events
Singles	Doubles
- Almaty Cup

Alexandre Krasnoroutskiy and Denys Molchanov were the defending champions, but only Molchanov tried to defend his title.
He teamed up with Yang Tsung-hua and they won this tournament, by defeating Pierre-Ludovic Duclos and Alexey Kedryuk 4–6, 7–6(5), [11–9] in the final.

== Seeds ==
1. (Canada) Pierre-Ludovic Duclos / (Kazakhstan) Alexey Kedryuk (final)
2. (Ukraine) Denys Molchanov / (Chinese Taipei) Yang Tsung-hua (champions)
3. (Australia) Sadik Kadir / (India) Purav Raja (semifinals)
4. (Jamaica) Dustin Brown / (Austria) Rainer Eitzinger (first round)

== Draw ==
Key

- Q = Qualifier
- WC = Wild card
- LL = Lucky loser
- Alt = Alternate
- ITF = ITF entry
- PR = Protected ranking
- SR = Special ranking
- SE = Special exempt
- JE = Junior exempt
- JR = Junior Accelerator Programme entrant
- CO = College Accelerator Programme entrant
- NG = Next Gen Accelerator Program entrant
- w/o = Walkover
- r = Retired
- d = Defaulted

=== Draw ===
First round
1	(Canada) P-L Duclos (Kazakhstan) A Kedryuk	7	6^{4}	[10]
(Romania) P-L Luncanu (Japan) T Matsui	6^{3}	7	[7]
(Slovakia) K Čapkovič (Slovakia) M Semjan	3	6	[10]
(France) J-N Insausti (France) M Rodrigues	6	4	[8]
5	(Jamaica) D Brown (Austria) R Eitzinger	2	5
(Chinese Taipei) T Chen (Japan) J Mitsuhashi	6	7
(Kazakhstan) S Abdukhalikov (Germany) L Pörschke	4	3
(Latvia) A Juška (Latvia) D Pavlovs	6	6
WC	(Kazakhstan) A Rakhishev (Kazakhstan) S Yessenbekov	2	1
(United States) R Rizza (New Zealand) J Statham	6	6
WC	(Kazakhstan) D Borodkin (Kazakhstan) S Bykov	1	1
3	(Australia) S Kadir (India) P Raja	6	6
(Russia) M Elgin (Uzbekistan) V Uzakov	6^{8}	6	[5]
(Russia) I Belyaev (Ukraine) I Sergeyev	7	4	[10]
WC	(Kazakhstan) D Braun (Kazakhstan) M Filippov	4	1
2	(Ukraine) D Molchanov (Chinese Taipei) T-h Yang	6	6

Quarterfinals
1	(Canada) P-L Duclos (Kazakhstan) A Kedryuk	6	6
(Slovakia) K Čapkovič (Slovakia) M Semjan	2	1
(Chinese Taipei) T Chen (Japan) J Mitsuhashi	4	0
(Latvia) A Juška (Latvia) D Pavlovs	6	6
(United States) R Rizza (New Zealand) J Statham	4	2
3	(Australia) S Kadir (India) P Raja	6	6
(Russia) I Belyaev (Ukraine) I Sergeyev	2	6	[7]
2	(Ukraine) D Molchanov (Chinese Taipei) T-h Yang	6	3	[10]

Semifinals
1	(Canada) P-L Duclos (Kazakhstan) A Kedryuk	6	6
(Latvia) A Juška (Latvia) D Pavlovs	3	4
3	(Australia) S Kadir (India) P Raja	1	4
2	(Ukraine) D Molchanov (Chinese Taipei) T-h Yang	6	6

Finals
1	(Canada) P-L Duclos (Kazakhstan) A Kedryuk	6	6^{5}	[9]
2	(Ukraine) D Molchanov (Chinese Taipei) T-h Yang	4	7	[11]
