= 2011 Fergana Challenger – Singles =

Singles
- 2011 Fergana Challenger

Final
- Champion: (Israel) Dudi Sela
- Runner-up: (Australia) Greg Jones
- Score: 6–2, 6–1

Events
Singles	Doubles
← 2010 ·	Fergana Challenger	· 2012 →

Evgeny Kirillov was the defending champion. He retired in his second round's match against Yang Tsung-hua.
Dudi Sela won in the final 6–2, 6–1, against Greg Jones.

== Seeds ==
1. (Israel) Dudi Sela (champion)
2. (Japan) Yūichi Sugita (semifinals)
3. (Thailand) Danai Udomchoke (quarterfinals)
4. (Russia) Evgeny Kirillov (second round, retired)
5. (Russia) Denis Matsukevich (quarterfinals)
6. (Australia) Greg Jones (final)
7. (South Africa) Raven Klaasen (quarterfinals)
8. (New Zealand) Michael Venus (first round)

== Draw ==
=== Key ===
- Q = Qualifier
- WC = Wild card
- LL = Lucky loser
- Alt = Alternate
- SE = Special exempt
- PR = Protected ranking
- ITF = ITF entry
- JE = Junior exempt
- w/o = Walkover
- r = Retired
- d = Defaulted
- SR = Special ranking

=== Finals ===
Semifinals
1	(Israel) Dudi Sela	6	6
(Slovakia) Miloslav Mečíř Jr.	4	4
6	(Australia) Greg Jones	6	3	7
2	(Japan) Yūichi Sugita	3	6	5

Final
1	(Israel) Dudi Sela	6	6
6	(Australia) Greg Jones	2	1

=== Top half ===
First round
1	(Israel) D Sela	6	6
WC	(Uzbekistan) Bobur Kamiljanov	1	0
WC	(Uzbekistan) Abd. Saidmukhamedov	3	0
(South Korea) W-s Jun	6	6
LL	(Russia) Ervand Gasparyan	7	6^{2}	6
Q	(Russia) Richard Muzaev	6^{3}	7	4
(Japan) H Kondo	6^{2}	2
7	(South Africa) R Klaasen	7	6
3	(Thailand) D Udomchoke	6	3	6
(Uzbekistan) M Inoyatov	3	6	3
WC	(Uzbekistan) Temur Ismailov	6^{3}	2
(Russia) M Elgin	7	6
(Japan) T Matsui	7	6
(Kazakhstan) M Ledovskikh	5	1
(Slovakia) M Mečíř Jr.	6	4	7
8	(New Zealand) M Venus	4	6	5

Second round
1	(Israel) D Sela	6^{4}	6	6
(South Korea) W-s Jun	7	3	1
LL	(Russia) Ervand Gasparyan	3	6	3
7	(South Africa) R Klaasen	6	1	6
3	(Thailand) D Udomchoke	6	6
(Russia) M Elgin	4	2
(Japan) T Matsui	6^{4}	6	3
(Slovakia) M Mečíř Jr.	7	4	6

Quarterfinals
1	(Israel) D Sela	7	6
7	(South Africa) R Klaasen	5	2
3	(Thailand) D Udomchoke	5	3
(Slovakia) M Mečíř Jr.	7	6

Semifinals
1	(Israel) D Sela	6	6
(Slovakia) M Mečíř Jr.	4	4

=== Bottom half ===
First round
6	(Australia) G Jones	6^{5}	6	6
(South Korea) K-t Im	7	1	3
(Finland) H Heliövaara	6	6
WC	(Uzbekistan) Levan Mamtadzhi	1	1
(China) M Gong	6	3	2
(Chinese Taipei) T-h Yang	1	6	6
(Switzerland) Adrian Bossel	4	4
4	(Russia) E Kirillov	6	6
5	(Russia) D Matsukevich	3	6	6
Q	(Russia) Vitali Reshetnikov	6	3	0
(Belgium) Julien Dubail	2	2
(Russia) Mikhail Vasiliev	6	6
(Brazil) L Kirche	4	6^{8}
Q	(Russia) I Belyaev	6	7
Q	(Russia) Alexander Rumyantsev	3	2
2	(Japan) Y Sugita	6	6

Second round
6	(Australia) G Jones	6	6^{0}	7
(Finland) H Heliövaara	3	7	6^{1}
(Chinese Taipei) T-h Yang	2	7	3
4	(Russia) E Kirillov	6	6^{7}	0^{r}
5	(Russia) D Matsukevich	7	6
(Russia) Mikhail Vasiliev	5	3
Q	(Russia) I Belyaev	3	3
2	(Japan) Y Sugita	6	6

Quarterfinals
6	(Australia) G Jones	5	6	7
(Chinese Taipei) T-h Yang	7	3	6^{2}
5	(Russia) D Matsukevich	3	2
2	(Japan) Y Sugita	6	6

Semifinals
6	(Australia) G Jones	6	3	7
2	(Japan) Y Sugita	3	6	5
