= 2013 Fergana Challenger – Men's singles =

Men's singles
- 2013 Fergana Challenger

Final
- Champion: (Moldova) Radu Albot
- Runner-up: (Serbia) Ilija Bozoljac
- Score: 7–6^{(11–9)}, 6–7^{(3–7)}, 6–1

Events
Singles	men	women
Doubles	men	women
← 2012 ·	Fergana Challenger	· 2014 →

The Fergana Challenger is a professional outdoor tennis tournament that is held annually in Fergana Uzbekistan. This tournament is part of the ATP Challenger Tour and the ITF Women's Circuit. The Men's singles event of the 2013 Fergana Challenger cumulated with Radu Albot winning the title, defeating Ilija Bozoljac in the final, 7–6^{(11–9)}, 6–7^{(3–7)}, 6–1. Yuki Bhambri was the defending champion but decided not to participate.

== Seeds ==
1. (Kazakhstan) Andrey Golubev (semifinals)
2. (United Kingdom) James Ward (first round)
3. (Tunisia) Malek Jaziri (semifinals)
4. (Uzbekistan) Farrukh Dustov (second round)
5. (Moldova) Radu Albot (champion)
6. (Chinese Taipei) Huang Liang-Chi (first round)
7. (Egypt) Mohamed Safwat (quarterfinals)
8. (Belarus) Dzmitry Zhyrmont (first round)

== Draw ==
=== Key ===
- Q = Qualifier
- WC = Wild card
- LL = Lucky loser
- Alt = Alternate
- SE = Special exempt
- PR = Protected ranking
- ITF = ITF entry
- JE = Junior exempt
- w/o = Walkover
- r = Retired
- d = Defaulted
- SR = Special ranking

=== Finals ===
Semifinals
1	(Kazakhstan) Andrey Golubev	6^{5}	4
(Serbia) Ilija Bozoljac	7^{7}	6
3	(Tunisia) Malek Jaziri	1	2
5	(Moldova) Radu Albot	6	6

Final
(Serbia) Ilija Bozoljac	6^{9}	7^{7}	1
5	(Moldova) Radu Albot	7^{11}	6^{3}	6

=== Top half ===
First round
1	(Kazakhstan) A Golubev	6	6
Q	(Belarus) Y Shyla	4	2
WC	(Uzbekistan) S Fayziev	6	6
Q	(Russia) Fedor Chervyakov	1	1
Q	(Uzbekistan) Batyr Sapaev	2	1
(Czech Republic) R Jebavý	6	6
(Austria) M Neuchrist	4	7	4
7	(Egypt) M Safwat	6	5	6
4	(Uzbekistan) F Dustov	6^{7}	6	6
Alt	(Kyrgyzstan) D Duldaev	7^{9}	3	3
(Chinese Taipei) T Chen	6	4	3
(Belarus) A Bury	3	6	6
(Russia) V Baluda	4	2
(Belarus) E Gerasimov	6	6
(Serbia) I Bozoljac	6	7
8/Alt	(Belarus) D Zhyrmont	4	5

Second round
1	(Kazakhstan) A Golubev	6	6
WC	(Uzbekistan) S Fayziev	4	3
(Czech Republic) R Jebavý	6^{5}	3
7	(Egypt) M Safwat	7^{7}	6
4	(Uzbekistan) F Dustov	6^{3}	6^{2}
(Belarus) A Bury	7^{7}	7^{7}
(Belarus) E Gerasimov	4	4
(Serbia) I Bozoljac	6	6

Quarterfinals
1	(Kazakhstan) A Golubev	6	6
7	(Egypt) M Safwat	2	4
(Belarus) A Bury	6^{3}	6^{3}
(Serbia) I Bozoljac	7^{7}	7^{7}

Semifinals
1	(Kazakhstan) A Golubev	6^{5}	4
(Serbia) I Bozoljac	7^{7}	6

=== Bottom half ===
First round
6	(Chinese Taipei) Huang L-c	1	6	4
(Russia) V Rudnev	6	1	6
(Russia) Alexander Lobkov	6	6
(Russia) A Karatsev	3	3
WC	(Uzbekistan) Shonigmatjon Shofayziyev	7^{7}	6
(Belarus) A Vasilevski	6^{3}	3
(Japan) H Kondo	1	2
3	(Tunisia) M Jaziri	6	6
5	(Moldova) R Albot	6	2	6
(Uzbekistan) T Ismailov	1	6	2
(Russia) D Matsukevich	6	6
(Belarus) S Betov	4	3
WC	(Uzbekistan) Pavel Tsoy	7^{7}	3	0
Q	(Uzbekistan) S Ikramov	6^{4}	6	6
(Russia) A Kudryavtsev	6^{2}	6	6
2	(United Kingdom) J Ward	7^{7}	3	4

Second round
(Russia) V Rudnev	2	1
(Russia) A Lobkov	6	6
WC	(Uzbekistan) S Shofayziyev	3	0
3	(Tunisia) M Jaziri	6	6
5	(Moldova) R Albot	3	6	6
(Russia) D Matsukevich	6	3	3
Q	(Uzbekistan) S Ikramov	6	1	4
(Russia) A Kudryavtsev	3	6	6

Quarterfinals
(Russia) A Lobkov	6	6^{3}	2
3	(Tunisia) M Jaziri	3	7^{7}	6
5	(Moldova) R Albot	3
(Russia) A Kudryavtsev	0^{r}

Semifinals
3	(Tunisia) M Jaziri	1	2
5	(Moldova) R Albot	6	6
