= 2013 Fergana Challenger – Men's doubles =

Men's doubles
- 2013 Fergana Challenger

Final
- Champions: (Uzbekistan) Farrukh Dustov (Tunisia) Malek Jaziri
- Runners-up: (Serbia) Ilija Bozoljac (Czech Republic) Roman Jebavý
- Score: 6–3, 6–3

Events
Singles	men	women
Doubles	men	women
← 2012 ·	Fergana Challenger	· 2014 →

Izak van der Merwe and Raven Klaasen were the defending champions, but not to participate.

Farrukh Dustov and Malek Jaziri won the title, defeating Ilija Bozoljac and Roman Jebavý in the final, 6–3, 6–3.

== Seeds ==
1. (China) Chen Ti / (Austria) Maximilian Neuchrist (semifinals)
2. (Kazakhstan) Andrey Golubev / (Russia) Alexander Kudryavtsev (first round)
3. (Chinese Taipei) Huang Liang-chi / (Japan) Hiroki Kondo (quarterfinals)
4. (Belarus) Sergey Betov / (Belarus) Alexander Bury (first round)

== Draw ==
=== Key ===
- Q = Qualifier
- WC = Wild card
- LL = Lucky loser
- Alt = Alternate
- SE = Special exempt
- PR = Protected ranking
- ITF = ITF entry
- JE = Junior exempt
- w/o = Walkover
- r = Retired
- d = Defaulted
- SR = Special ranking

=== Draw ===
First round
1	(China) T Chen (Austria) M Neuchrist	7^{7}	6
(Russia) Fedor Chervyakov (Kyrgyzstan) D Duldaev	6^{0}	4
(Uzbekistan) T Ismailov (Uzbekistan) S Fayziev	4	2
(Russia) V Baluda (Russia) A Karatsev	6	6
3	(Chinese Taipei) L-c Huang (Japan) H Kondo	7^{7}	7^{7}
(Belarus) Y Shyla (Belarus) A Vasilevski	6^{2}	6^{5}
WC	(Uzbekistan) Sardor Pulatov (Uzbekistan) Alexander Tsatkin	1	2
(Uzbekistan) F Dustov (Tunisia) M Jaziri	6	6
(Russia) Alexander Lobkov (Uzbekistan) V Uzakov	5	6	[10]
WC	(Uzbekistan) Shonigmatjon Shofayziyev (Uzbekistan) Pavel Tsoy	7	3	[4]
(Serbia) I Bozoljac (Czech Republic) R Jebavý	6	6^{1}	[10]
4	(Belarus) S Betov (Belarus) A Bury	4	7^{7}	[6]
(Moldova) R Albot (Russia) D Matsukevich	6	6
WC	(Uzbekistan) S Ikramov (Uzbekistan) Batyr Sapaev	3	2
(Belarus) E Gerasimov (Belarus) D Zhyrmont	6	6
2	(Kazakhstan) A Golubev (Russia) A Kudryavtsev	3	1

Quarterfinals
1	(China) T Chen (Austria) M Neuchrist	6	6
(Russia) V Baluda (Russia) A Karatsev	1	4
3	(Chinese Taipei) L-c Huang (Japan) H Kondo	3	2
(Uzbekistan) F Dustov (Tunisia) M Jaziri	6	6
(Russia) A Lobkov (Uzbekistan) V Uzakov	5	4
(Serbia) I Bozoljac (Czech Republic) R Jebavý	7	6
(Moldova) R Albot (Russia) D Matsukevich	6	6
(Belarus) E Gerasimov (Belarus) D Zhyrmont	2	4

Semifinals
1	(China) T Chen (Austria) M Neuchrist	3	4
(Uzbekistan) F Dustov (Tunisia) M Jaziri	6	6
(Serbia) I Bozoljac (Czech Republic) R Jebavý	6	6
(Moldova) R Albot (Russia) D Matsukevich	3	4

Final
(Uzbekistan) F Dustov (Tunisia) M Jaziri	6	6
(Serbia) I Bozoljac (Czech Republic) R Jebavý	3	3
