= 2013 Fergana Challenger – Women's singles =

Women's singles
- 2013 Fergana Challenger

Final
- Champion: (Uzbekistan) Nigina Abduraimova
- Runner-up: (Ukraine) Anastasiya Vasylyeva
- Score: 2–6, 6–1, 7–6^{(7–4)}

Events
Singles	men	women
Doubles	men	women
← 2012 ·	Fergana Challenger	· 2014 →

Donna Vekić was the defending champion, having won the event in 2012, but she chose not to participate.

Nigina Abduraimova won the title, defeating Anastasiya Vasylyeva in the final, 2–6, 6–1, 7–6^{(7–4)}.

== Seeds ==
1. (Ukraine) Lyudmyla Kichenok (semifinals)
2. (Uzbekistan) Nigina Abduraimova (champion)
3. (Ukraine) Anastasiya Vasylyeva (final)
4. (Slovakia) Michaela Hončová (second round)
5. (Ukraine) Veronika Kapshay (semifinals)
6. (Japan) Mari Tanaka (quarterfinals)
7. (Turkey) Başak Eraydın (quarterfinals)
8. (India) Ankita Raina (quarterfinals)

== Main draw ==
=== Key ===
- Q = Qualifier
- WC = Wild card
- LL = Lucky loser
- Alt = Alternate
- SE = Special exempt
- PR = Protected ranking
- ITF = ITF entry
- JE = Junior exempt
- w/o = Walkover
- r = Retired
- d = Defaulted
- SR = Special ranking

=== Finals ===
Semifinals
1/Q	(Ukraine) Lyudmyla Kichenok	3	4
3	(Ukraine) Anastasiya Vasylyeva	6	6
5	(Ukraine) Veronika Kapshay	4	3
2	(Uzbekistan) Nigina Abduraimova	6	6

Final
3	(Ukraine) Anastasiya Vasylyeva	6	1	6^{4}
2	(Uzbekistan) Nigina Abduraimova	2	6	7^{7}

=== Top half ===
First round
1/Q	(Ukraine) L Kichenok	6	6
(Uzbekistan) P Merenkova	1	2
(Uzbekistan) A Abdurakhimova	5	3
(Kyrgyzstan) K Palkina	7	6
(Israel) D Khazaniuk	6	6
(Russia) A Grigoryan	1	1
(India) N Chilumula	4	1
7	(Turkey) B Eraydın	6	6
3	(Ukraine) A Vasylyeva	6	6
(Russia) A Kechko	0	2
Q	(Uzbekistan) D Valihanova	1	2
(Russia) A Smolina	6	6
(Ukraine) O Korashvili	2	6	1
(Japan) Y Miyazaki	6	3	6
WC	(Uzbekistan) J Sadykzhanova	0	1
8	(India) A Raina	6	6

Second round
1/Q	(Ukraine) L Kichenok	6	6
(Kyrgyzstan) K Palkina	1	0
(Israel) D Khazaniuk	6^{3}	2
7	(Turkey) B Eraydın	7^{7}	6
3	(Ukraine) A Vasylyeva	6	6
(Russia) A Smolina	3	1
(Japan) Y Miyazaki	1	2
8	(India) A Raina	6	6

Quarterfinals
1/Q	(Ukraine) L Kichenok	6	6
7	(Turkey) B Eraydın	2	1
3	(Ukraine) A Vasylyeva	6	6
8	(India) A Raina	1	3

Semifinals
1/Q	(Ukraine) L Kichenok	3	4
3	(Ukraine) A Vasylyeva	6	6

=== Bottom half ===
First round
5	(Ukraine) V Kapshay	6	6
Q	(Turkey) M Sezer	3	4
WC	(Uzbekistan) Y Khon	7	6
WC	(Uzbekistan) S Saidhujaeva	5	2
(Japan) E Takao	6	6
(Uzbekistan) S Sharipova	2	4
(Belarus) P Pekhova	4	3
4	(Slovakia) M Hončová	6	6
6	(Japan) M Tanaka	6	6
Q	(Russia) T Grigoryan	2	3
Q	(United States) A Riley	0	6^{6}
Q	(Uzbekistan) G Yusupova	6	7^{8}
Q	(Uzbekistan) A Folts	6	6
WC	(Uzbekistan) A Mukhametshina	2	2
Q	(Uzbekistan) A Stakhanova	0	0
2	(Uzbekistan) N Abduraimova	6	6

Second round
5	(Ukraine) V Kapshay	6	6
WC	(Uzbekistan) Y Khon	2	1
(Japan) E Takao	7^{7}	0	6
4	(Slovakia) M Hončová	6^{4}	6	3
6	(Japan) M Tanaka	6	6
Q	(Uzbekistan) G Yusupova	1	0
(Uzbekistan) A Folts	1	0
2	(Uzbekistan) N Abduraimova	6	6

Quarterfinals
5	(Ukraine) V Kapshay	6	6
(Japan) E Takao	2	4
6	(Japan) M Tanaka	6^{0}	0
2	(Uzbekistan) N Abduraimova	7^{7}	6

Semifinals
5	(Ukraine) V Kapshay	4	3
2	(Uzbekistan) N Abduraimova	6	6
