= 2009 Fergana Challenger =

- Date: May 18 – May 23
- Edition: 10th
- Surface: Hard
- Location: Fergana, Uzbekistan

Champions

Singles
- (Slovakia) Lukáš Lacko

Doubles
- (Russia) Pavel Chekhov / (Kazakhstan) Alexey Kedryuk
← 2008 ·	Fergana Challenger	· 2010 →

The 2009 Fergana Challenger was a professional tennis tournament played on outdoor hard courts. It was part of the 2009 ATP Challenger Tour. It took place in Fergana, Uzbekistan between May 18 and May 23, 2009.

== Singles entrants ==
=== Seeds ===
Nationality	Player	Ranking*	Seeding
THA	Danai Udomchoke	139	1
CZE	Pavel Šnobel	174	2
RUS	Alexander Kudryavtsev	194	3
UKR	Illya Marchenko	244	4
AUS	Samuel Groth	252	5
RUS	Konstantin Kravchuk	276	6
SVK	Kamil Čapkovič	279	7
SVK	Lukáš Lacko	280	8

- Rankings are as of May 11, 2009.

=== Other entrants ===
The following players received wildcards into the singles main draw:

- (Uzbekistan) Rifat Biktyakov
- (Uzbekistan) Murad Inoyatov
- (Uzbekistan) Sergei Shipilov
- (Uzbekistan) Vaja Uzakov

The following players received entry from the qualifying draw:

- (Russia) Evgeny Kirillov
- (India) Purav Raja
- (Russia) Artem Sitak
- (Thailand) Kittipong Wachiramanowong

== Champions ==
=== Singles ===
(Slovakia) Lukáš Lacko vs (Australia) Samuel Groth, 4–6, 7–5, 7–6(4)

=== Doubles ===
(Russia) Pavel Chekhov / (Kazakhstan) Alexey Kedryuk vs (Canada) Pierre-Ludovic Duclos / (Pakistan) Aisam-ul-Haq Qureshi, 4–6, 6–3, [10–5]
