= 2011 Fergana Challenger – Doubles =

Doubles
- 2011 Fergana Challenger

Final
- Champions: (United States) John Paul Fruttero (South Africa) Raven Klaasen
- Runners-up: (Chinese Taipei) Im Kyu-tae (Thailand) Danai Udomchoke
- Score: 6–0, 6–3

Events
Singles	Doubles
← 2010 ·	Fergana Challenger	· 2012 →

Brendan Evans and Toshihide Matsui were the defending champions, but Evans decided not to play this year.
Matsui teams up with Divij Sharan, but lost in the second round to Im Kyu-tae and Danai Udomchoke.
Kyu-tae and Udomchoke went on to lose the final 0–6, 3–6 against John Paul Fruttero and Raven Klaasen.

== Seeds ==
1. (China) Gong Maoxin / (China) Li Zhe (first round)
2. (Russia) Michail Elgin / (Israel) Dudi Sela (first round)
3. (United States) John Paul Fruttero / (South Africa) Raven Klaasen (champions)
4. (Japan) Hiroki Kondo / (Chinese Taipei) Yang Tsung-hua (semifinals)

== Draw ==
=== Key ===
- Q = Qualifier
- WC = Wild card
- LL = Lucky loser
- Alt = Alternate
- SE = Special exempt
- PR = Protected ranking
- ITF = ITF entry
- JE = Junior exempt
- w/o = Walkover
- r = Retired
- d = Defaulted
- SR = Special ranking

=== Draw ===
First round
1	(China) M Gong (China) Z Li	6	6^{6}	[4]
(Japan) T Matsui (India) D Sharan	2	7	[10]
WC	(Uzbekistan) S Ikramov (Uzbekistan) Nigmat Shofayziev	2	2
(Chinese Taipei) K-t Im (Thailand) D Udomchoke	6	6
4	(Japan) H Kondo (Chinese Taipei) T-h Yang	6	6
WC	(Uzbekistan) Bobur Kamiljanov (Uzbekistan) Sardor Pulatov	2	2
(Slovakia) M Mečíř Jr. (New Zealand) M Venus	7	4	[7]
(Brazil) L Kirche (Russia) Vitali Reshetnikov	5	6	[10]
WC	(Uzbekistan) Temur Ismailov (Uzbekistan) Abd. Saidmukhamedov	2	3
(Russia) Alexander Rumyantsev (Belarus) A Vasilevski	6	6
(Uzbekistan) M Inoyatov (Russia) D Sitak	5	2
3	(United States) JP Fruttero (South Africa) R Klaasen	7	6
(Kazakhstan) A Kedryuk (Russia) Mikhail Vasiliev	3	6	[10]
(Russia) I Belyaev (Russia) D Matsukevich	6	2	[6]
(Finland) H Heliövaara (South Korea) W-s Jun	2	6	[10]
2	(Russia) M Elgin (Israel) D Sela	6	4	[5]

Quarterfinals
(Japan) T Matsui (India) D Sharan	4	4
(Chinese Taipei) K-t Im (Thailand) D Udomchoke	6	6
4	(Japan) H Kondo (Chinese Taipei) T-h Yang	6	6
(Brazil) L Kirche (Russia) Vitali Reshetnikov	3	4
(Russia) Alexander Rumyantsev (Belarus) A Vasilevski	2	6	[10]
3	(United States) JP Fruttero (South Africa) R Klaasen	6	4	[12]
(Kazakhstan) A Kedryuk (Russia) Mikhail Vasiliev	6	4	[10]
(Finland) H Heliövaara (South Korea) W-s Jun	4	6	[5]

Semifinals
(Chinese Taipei) K-t Im (Thailand) D Udomchoke	7	2	[10]
4	(Japan) H Kondo (Chinese Taipei) T-h Yang	6^{5}	6	[3]
3	(United States) JP Fruttero (South Africa) R Klaasen	7	6
(Kazakhstan) A Kedryuk (Russia) Mikhail Vasiliev	6^{3}	3

Final
(Chinese Taipei) K-t Im (Thailand) D Udomchoke	0	3
3	(United States) JP Fruttero (South Africa) R Klaasen	6	6
