= 2009 Almaty Cup =

- Date: August 24 – August 30
- Edition: 3rd
- Location: Almaty, Kazakhstan

Champions

Singles
- (Ukraine) Ivan Sergeyev

Doubles
- (Ukraine) Denys Molchanov / (Chinese Taipei) Yang Tsung-hua
- Almaty Cup

The 2009 Almaty Cup was a professional tennis tournament played on outdoor hard courts. It was the third edition of the tournament which was part of the 2009 ATP Challenger Tour. It took place in Almaty, Kazakhstan between 24 and 30 August 2009.

== Singles entrants ==
=== Seeds ===
Nationality	Player	Ranking*	Seeding
RUS	Michail Elgin	194	1
SVK	Kamil Čapkovič	213	2
UKR	Ivan Sergeyev	271	3
JAM	Dustin Brown	274	4
LAT	Andis Juška	278	5
JPN	Junn Mitsuhashi	297	6
AUS	Greg Jones	305	7
LAT	Deniss Pavlovs	311	8

- Rankings are as of August 17, 2009.

=== Other entrants ===
The following players received wildcards into the singles main draw:

- (Kazakhstan) Syrym Abdulkhalikov
- (Kazakhstan) Danjil Braun
- (Kazakhstan) Aidynbek Rakhishev
- (Kazakhstan) Serizhan Yessenbekov

The following players received entry from the qualifying draw:

- (Australia) Sadik Kadir
- (Russia) Mikhail Ledovskikh
- (Republic of Ireland) James McGee
- (Ukraine) Denys Molchanov

== Champions ==
=== Singles ===
(Ukraine) Ivan Sergeyev def. (Jamaica) Dustin Brown, 6–3, 5–7, 6–4

=== Doubles ===
(Ukraine) Denys Molchanov / (Chinese Taipei) Yang Tsung-hua def. (Canada) Pierre-Ludovic Duclos / (Kazakhstan) Alexey Kedryuk, 4–6, 7–6(5), [11–9]
