= 2009 Fergana Challenger – Doubles =

Doubles
- 2009 Fergana Challenger

Final
- Champions: (Russia) Pavel Chekhov (Kazakhstan) Alexey Kedryuk
- Runners-up: (Canada) Pierre-Ludovic Duclos (Pakistan) Aisam-ul-Haq Qureshi
- Score: 4–6, 6–3, [10–5]

Events
Singles	Doubles
- Fergana Challenger

Konstantin Kravchuk and Łukasz Kubot didn't defend their 2009 title. Kubot chose to not play and Kravchuk (who partnered up with Lukáš Lacko) lost to more late champions - Pavel Chekhov and Alexey Kedryuk in the quarterfinals.
Chekhov and Kedryuk became the new masters, after their won against Pierre-Ludovic Duclos and Aisam-ul-Haq Qureshi in the final.

== Seeds ==
1. (Thailand) Sanchai Ratiwatana / (Thailand) Sonchat Ratiwatana (quarterfinals)
2. (Canada) Pierre-Ludovic Duclos / (Pakistan) Aisam-ul-Haq Qureshi (final)
3. (Russia) Evgeny Kirillov / (Russia) Alexandre Kudryavtsev (semifinals)
4. (Russia) Pavel Chekhov / (Kazakhstan) Alexey Kedryuk (champions)

== Draw ==
Key

- Q = Qualifier
- WC = Wild card
- LL = Lucky loser
- Alt = Alternate
- ITF = ITF entry
- PR = Protected ranking
- SR = Special ranking
- SE = Special exempt
- JE = Junior exempt
- JR = Junior Accelerator Programme entrant
- CO = College Accelerator Programme entrant
- NG = Next Gen Accelerator Program entrant
- w/o = Walkover
- r = Retired
- d = Defaulted

=== Draw ===
First round
1	(Thailand) Sa Ratiwatana (Thailand) So Ratiwatana	7	6
(Slovakia) K Čapkovič (Slovakia) M Semjan	6^{5}	0
(South Africa) R Klaasen (Thailand) D Udomchoke	6	6
WC	(Uzbekistan) J Jalolov (Uzbekistan) S Shipilov	1	1
4	(Russia) P Chekhov (Kazakhstan) A Kedryuk	7	4	[15]
(Japan) J Mitsuhashi (Japan) Y Sugita	6^{3}	6	[13]
WC	(Uzbekistan) M Inoyatov (Uzbekistan) V Uzakov	4	4
(Russia) K Kravchuk (Slovakia) L Lacko	6	6
(Chinese Taipei) T Chen (Czech Republic) P Šnobel	6	6
(Moldova) A Gorban (Russia) A Sitak	2	4
(Australia) S Groth (India) P Raja	6	1	[9]
3	(Russia) E Kirillov (Russia) A Kudryavtsev	4	6	[11]
(Ukraine) I Marchenko (Ukraine) I Sergeyev	4	6	[8]
WC	(Uzbekistan) R Biktyakov (Indonesia) C Rungkat	6	3	[10]
ALT	(Uzbekistan) M Rakovskiy (Uzbekistan) U Shobidinov	w/o
2	(Canada) P-L Duclos (Pakistan) A-u-H Qureshi

Quarterfinals
1	(Thailand) Sa Ratiwatana (Thailand) So Ratiwatana	6^{5}	6	[8]
(South Africa) R Klaasen (Thailand) D Udomchoke	7	3	[10]
4	(Russia) P Chekhov (Kazakhstan) A Kedryuk	6^{5}	6	[10]
(Russia) K Kravchuk (Slovakia) L Lacko	7	4	[5]
(Chinese Taipei) T Chen (Czech Republic) P Šnobel	5	3
3	(Russia) E Kirillov (Russia) A Kudryavtsev	7	6
WC	(Uzbekistan) R Biktyakov (Indonesia) C Rungkat	1	3
2	(Canada) P-L Duclos (Pakistan) A-u-H Qureshi	6	6

Semifinals
(South Africa) R Klaasen (Thailand) D Udomchoke	3	2
4	(Russia) P Chekhov (Kazakhstan) A Kedryuk	6	6
3	(Russia) E Kirillov (Russia) A Kudryavtsev	4	3
2	(Canada) P-L Duclos (Pakistan) A-u-H Qureshi	6	6

Finals
4	(Russia) P Chekhov (Kazakhstan) A Kedryuk	4	6	[10]
2	(Canada) P-L Duclos (Pakistan) A-u-H Qureshi	6	3	[5]
