= 2010 Fergana Challenger – Singles =

Singles
- 2010 Fergana Challenger

Final
- Champion: (Russia) Evgeny Kirillov
- Runner-up: (China) Zhang Ze
- Score: 6–3, 2–6, 6–2

Events
Singles	Doubles
- Fergana Challenger

Lukáš Lacko was the defending champion, but he chose to not participate this year.
Evgeny Kirillov won in the final 6–3, 2–6, 6–2, against Zhang Ze.

== Seeds ==
1. (Russia) Alexander Kudryavtsev (semifinals)
2. (United States) Brendan Evans (quarterfinals)
3. (Japan) Tatsuma Ito (second round)
4. (Ukraine) Sergei Bubka (first round)
5. (Slovakia) Andrej Martin (quarterfinals)
6. (Israel) Noam Okun (quarterfinals)
7. (Russia) Evgeny Kirillov (champion)
8. (Slovakia) Ivo Klec (first round)

== Draw ==
Key

- Q = Qualifier
- WC = Wild card
- LL = Lucky loser
- Alt = Alternate
- ITF = ITF entry
- PR = Protected ranking
- SR = Special ranking
- SE = Special exempt
- JE = Junior exempt
- JR = Junior Accelerator Programme entrant
- CO = College Accelerator Programme entrant
- NG = Next Gen Accelerator Program entrant
- w/o = Walkover
- r = Retired
- d = Defaulted

=== Finals ===
Semifinals
1	(Russia) Alexander Kudryavtsev	2	6^{2}
Q	(China) Zhang Ze	6	7
(South Korea) Kim Young-Jun	5	0
7	(Russia) Evgeny Kirillov	7	6

Final
Q	(China) Zhang Ze	3	6	2
7	(Russia) Evgeny Kirillov	6	2	6

=== Top half ===
First round
1	(Russia) A Kudryavtsev	6	6
(Japan) Y Ito	2	2
WC	(Uzbekistan) M Inoyatov	6	2	2
(Russia) V Rudnev	2	6	6
WC	(Uzbekistan) V Uzakov	2	6	6
(Latvia) A Juška	6	3	4
(Russia) M Ledovskikh	6^{2}	6^{5}
6	(Israel) N Okun	7	7
4	(Ukraine) S Bubka	3	2
Q	(China) Z Zhang	6	6
(Canada) P-L Duclos	6	6
(Russia) A Sitak	4	1
(India) V Vardhan	7	6
PR	(Czech Republic) T Cakl	5	3
Q	(China) D Wu	0	1
5	(Slovakia) A Martin	6	6

Second round
1	(Russia) A Kudryavtsev	6	6
(Russia) V Rudnev	3	1
WC	(Uzbekistan) V Uzakov	2	2
6	(Israel) N Okun	6	6
Q	(China) Z Zhang	7	5	6
(Canada) P-L Duclos	5	7	2
(India) V Vardhan	6	4	2
5	(Slovakia) A Martin	1	6	6

Quarterfinals
1	(Russia) A Kudryavtsev	6	6
6	(Israel) N Okun	3	2
Q	(China) Z Zhang	6	4	6
5	(Slovakia) A Martin	4	6	4

Semifinals
1	(Russia) A Kudryavtsev	2	6^{2}
Q	(China) Z Zhang	6	7

=== Bottom half ===
First round
8	(Slovakia) I Klec	3	2
SE	(South Korea) Y-K Lim	6	6
(South Korea) Y-J Kim	7	6
SE	(South Korea) W-S Jun	6^{8}	3
(Australia) S Kadir	4	4
Q	(China) M-X Gong	6	6
WC	(Russia) L Starkov	4	4
3	(Japan) T Ito	6	6
7	(Russia) E Kirillov	6	6
Q	(Ukraine) D Molchanov	4	3
(Chinese Taipei) T-h Yang	6	6^{4}	3
WC	(Uzbekistan) F Dustov	3	7	6
(Belgium) D Goffin	5	6	4
(Russia) E Donskoy	7	4	6
(Kazakhstan) A Kedryuk	3	1
2	(United States) B Evans	6	6

Second round
SE	(South Korea) Y-K Lim	3	1	r
(South Korea) Y-J Kim	6	1
Q	(China) M-X Gong	7	6
3	(Japan) T Ito	5	3
7	(Russia) E Kirillov	6	6
WC	(Uzbekistan) F Dustov	3	4
(Russia) E Donskoy	4	5
2	(United States) B Evans	6	7

Quarterfinals
(South Korea) Y-J Kim	6	6
Q	(China) M-X Gong	4	1
7	(Russia) E Kirillov	3	6	6
2	(United States) B Evans	6	3	2

Semifinals
(South Korea) Y-J Kim	5	0
7	(Russia) E Kirillov	7	6
