= 2011 Fergana Challenger =

- Date: 16–21 May
- Edition: 12th
- Surface: Hard
- Location: Fergana, Uzbekistan

Champions

Singles
- (Israel) Dudi Sela

Doubles
- (United States) John Paul Fruttero / (South Africa) Raven Klaasen
← 2010 ·	Fergana Challenger	· 2012 →

The 2011 Fergana Challenger was a professional tennis tournament played on hard courts. It was the 12th edition of the tournament which was part of the 2011 ATP Challenger Tour. It took place in Fergana, Uzbekistan between 16 and 21 May 2011.

== ATP entrants ==
=== Seeds ===
Country	Player	Rank^{1}	Seed
ISR	Dudi Sela	147	1
JPN	Yūichi Sugita	206	2
THA	Danai Udomchoke	241	3
RUS	Evgeny Kirillov	275	4
RUS	Denis Matsukevich	277	5
AUS	Greg Jones	299	6
RSA	Raven Klaasen	304	7
NZL	Michael Venus	315	4

- Rankings are as of May 9, 2011.

=== Other entrants ===
The following players received wildcards into the singles main draw:

- (Uzbekistan) Temur Ismailov
- (Uzbekistan) Bobur Kamiljanov
- (Uzbekistan) Levan Mamtadzhi
- (Uzbekistan) Abduvoris Saidmukhamedov

The following players received entry from the qualifying draw:

- (Russia) Ilya Belyaev
- (Russia) Richard Muzaev
- (Russia) Vitali Reshetnikov
- (Russia) Alexander Rumyantsev
- (Russia) Ervand Gasparyan (as a Lucky loser)

== Champions ==
=== Singles ===
(Israel) Dudi Sela def. (Australia) Greg Jones, 6–2, 6–1

=== Doubles ===
(United States) John Paul Fruttero / (South Africa) Raven Klaasen def. (Chinese Taipei) Im Kyu-tae / (Thailand) Danai Udomchoke, 6–0, 6–3
