= 2009 Caversham International Tennis Tournament =

- Date: 9–15 November
- Edition: 2nd
- Location: Saint Brélade, Jersey, UK

Champions

Singles
- (Finland) Jarkko Nieminen

Doubles
- (Denmark) Frederik Nielsen / (Australia) Joseph Sirianni
← 2008 ·	Caversham International Tennis Tournament	· 2010 →

The 2009 Caversham International Tennis Tournament was a professional tennis tournament played on indoor carpet courts. It was the second edition of the tournament which was part of the 2009 ATP Challenger Tour. It took place in Saint Brélade, Jersey, Great Britain between 9 and 15 November 2009.

== ATP entrants ==
=== Seeds ===
Country	Player	Rank^{1}	Seed
GER	Florian Mayer	63	1
SVK	Karol Beck	78	2
FIN	Stéphane Robert	121	3
FIN	Jarkko Nieminen	122	4
SUI	Stéphane Bohli	148	5
SUI	Michael Lammer	167	6
GBR	Alex Bogdanovic	186	7
ROU	Adrian Ungur	191	8

- Rankings are as of November 2, 2009.

=== Other entrants ===
The following players received wildcards into the singles main draw:

- (United Kingdom) Colin Fleming
- (United Kingdom) James Marsalek
- (United Kingdom) David Rice
- (United Kingdom) Daniel Smethurst

The following players received entry from the qualifying draw:

- (United Kingdom) Daniel Cox
- (Netherlands) Robin Haase
- (Finland) Henri Kontinen
- (Switzerland) Roman Valent

== Champions ==
=== Singles ===
(Finland) Jarkko Nieminen def. (France) Stéphane Robert, 4–6, 6–1, 7–5

=== Doubles ===
(Denmark) Frederik Nielsen / (Australia) Joseph Sirianni def. (Finland) Henri Kontinen / (Finland) Jarkko Nieminen, 7–5, 3–6, [10–2]
