= 2010 Fergana Challenger =

- Date: May 17 – May 22
- Edition: 11th
- Surface: Hard
- Location: Fergana, Uzbekistan

Champions

Singles
- (Russia) Evgeny Kirillov

Doubles
- (United States) Brendan Evans / (Japan) Toshihide Matsui
← 2009 ·	Fergana Challenger	· 2011 →

The 2010 Fergana Challenger was a professional tennis tournament played on outdoor hard courts. It was part of the 2010 ATP Challenger Tour. It took place in Fergana, Uzbekistan between May 17 and May 22, 2010.

== ATP entrants ==
=== Seeds ===
Nationality	Player	Ranking*	Seeding
RUS	Alexander Kudryavtsev	248	1
USA	Brendan Evans	252	2
JPN	Tatsuma Ito	272	3
UKR	Sergei Bubka	276	4
SVK	Andrej Martin	286	5
ISR	Noam Okun	289	6
RUS	Evgeny Kirillov	290	7
SVK	Ivo Klec	305	8

- Rankings are as of May 10, 2010.

=== Other entrants ===
The following players received wildcards into the singles main draw:

- (Uzbekistan) Farrukh Dustov
- (Uzbekistan) Murad Inoyatov
- (Russia) Llia Starkov
- (Uzbekistan) Vaja Uzakov

The following players received entry from the qualifying draw:

- (China) Gong Maoxin
- (Ukraine) Denys Molchanov
- (China) Wu Di
- (China) Zhang Ze

The following players received special exempt into the main draw:

- (South Korea) Jun Woong-Sun
- (South Korea) Lim Yong-Kyu

The following player received entry with a protected ranking:

- (Czech Republic) Tomáš Cakl

== Champions ==
=== Singles ===
(Russia) Evgeny Kirillov def. (China) Zhang Ze, 6–3, 2–6, 6–2

=== Doubles ===
(United States) Brendan Evans / (Japan) Toshihide Matsui def. (China) Gong Maoxin / (China) Li Zhe, 3–6, 6–3, [10–8]
