= 2013 Fergana Challenger =

- Date: 23–29 September
- Edition: 14th (men); 3rd (women)
- Prize money: $50,000 (men) $25,000 (women)
- Surface: Hard
- Location: Fergana, Uzbekistan

Champions

Men's singles
- (Moldova) Radu Albot

Women's singles
- (Uzbekistan) Nigina Abduraimova

Men's doubles
- (Uzbekistan) Farrukh Dustov / (Tunisia) Malek Jaziri

Women's doubles
- (Ukraine) Lyudmyla Kichenok / (Belarus) Polina Pekhova
← 2012 ·	Fergana Challenger	· 2014 →

The 2013 Fergana Challenger was a professional tennis tournament played on hard courts. It was the 14th edition of the tournament for men which was part of the 2013 ATP Challenger Tour, offering $50,000 in prize money, and the third edition of the event for women on the 2013 ITF Women's Circuit, offering $25,000 in prize money. It took place in Fergana, Uzbekistan, on 23–29 September 2013.

== Men's singles main draw entrants ==
=== Seeds ===
Country	Player	Rank^{1}	Seed
KAZ	Andrey Golubev	139	1
GBR	James Ward	179	2
TUN	Malek Jaziri	180	3
UZB	Farrukh Dustov	215	4
MDA	Radu Albot	219	5
TPE	Huang Liang-chi	228	6
EGY	Mohamed Safwat	245	7
BLR	Dzmitry Zhyrmont	250	8

- ^{1} Rankings as of 16 September 2013

=== Other entrants ===
The following players received wildcards into the singles main draw:

- (Uzbekistan) Sanjar Fayziev
- (Uzbekistan) Temur Ismailov
- (Uzbekistan) Shonigmatjon Shofayziyev
- (Uzbekistan) Pavel Tsoy

The following players entered as an alternate into the singles main draw:

- (Kyrgyzstan) Daniiar Duldaev
- (Belarus) Dzmitry Zhyrmont

The following players received entry from the qualifying draw:

- (Russia) Fedor Chervyakov
- (Uzbekistan) Sarvar Ikramov
- (Uzbekistan) Batyr Sapaev
- (Belarus) Yaraslau Shyla

== Women's singles main draw entrants ==
=== Seeds ===
Country	Player	Rank^{1}	Seed
UKR	Lyudmyla Kichenok	202	1
UZB	Nigina Abduraimova	221	2
UKR	Anastasiya Vasylyeva	241	3
SVK	Michaela Hončová	242	4
UKR	Veronika Kapshay	274	5
JPN	Mari Tanaka	292	6
TUR	Başak Eraydın	293	7
IND	Ankita Raina	310	8

- ^{1} Rankings as of 16 September 2013

=== Other entrants ===
The following players received wildcards into the singles main draw:

- (Uzbekistan) Yana Khon
- (Uzbekistan) Amina Mukhametshina
- (Uzbekistan) Jamilya Sadykzhanova
- (Uzbekistan) Sarvinoz Saidhujaeva

The following players received entry from the qualifying draw:

- (Uzbekistan) Arina Folts
- (Russia) Tatiana Grigoryan
- (Ukraine) Lyudmyla Kichenok
- (United States) Alexandra Riley
- (Turkey) Melis Sezer
- (Uzbekistan) Aleksandra Stakhanova
- (Uzbekistan) Dona Valihanova
- (Uzbekistan) Guzal Yusupova

== Champions ==
=== Men's singles ===
- (Moldova) Radu Albot def. (Serbia) Ilija Bozoljac 7–6^{(11–9)}, 6–7^{(3–7)}, 6–1

=== Women's singles ===
- (Uzbekistan) Nigina Abduraimova def. (Ukraine) Anastasiya Vasylyeva 2–6, 6–1, 7–6^{(7–4)}

=== Men's doubles ===
- (Uzbekistan) Farrukh Dustov / (Tunisia) Malek Jaziri def. (Serbia) Ilija Bozoljac / (Czech Republic) Roman Jebavý 6–3, 6–3

=== Women's doubles ===
- (Ukraine) Lyudmyla Kichenok / (Belarus) Polina Pekhova def. (Slovakia) Michaela Hončová / (Ukraine) Veronika Kapshay 6–4, 6–2
