= Pavel Chekhov (tennis) =

Russian tennis player and coach

Pavel Chekhov Павел Чехов
- Country (sports): Russia
- Residence: Moscow, Russia
- Born: 27 July 1988 (age 36); Moscow, RSFSR, Soviet Union
- Plays: Right-handed (two handed-backhand)
- Prize money: $78,101

Singles
- Career record: 0–1 (at ATP Tour level, Grand Slam level, and in Davis Cup)
- Career titles: 0; 0 Challenger, 3 Futures
- Highest ranking: No. 231 (28 April 2008)

Grand Slam singles results
- French Open: Q1 (2008)
- Wimbledon: Q2 (2008)

Doubles
- Career record: 0–1 (at ATP Tour level, Grand Slam level, and in Davis Cup)
- Career titles: 0; 2 Challenger, 4 Futures
- Highest ranking: No. 187 (20 July 2009)
- Last updated on: 21 February 2023.

Pavel Sergeevich Chekhov (Па́вел Серге́евич Че́хов; born 27 July 1988) is a retired Russian tennis player.

== Tennis career ==
On the junior tour, Chekhov had a career high ITF juniors combined ranking of 10, achieved in December 2006. Chekhov reached the semifinals of the boys' singles events at the 2006 Australian Open and the 2006 Wimbledon Championships.

Chekhov has a career high ATP singles ranking of 231 achieved on 28 April 2008. He also has a career high ATP doubles ranking of 187 achieved on 20 July 2007. Chekhov has won 2 ATP Challenger Tour doubles titles as well as 3 ITF Futures singles titles and 4 ITF Futures doubles titles.

Chekhov made his ATP main draw debut at the 2007 St. Petersburg Open in the singles event as a wildcard entrant.

== ATP Challenger and ITF Futures finals ==
=== Singles: 7 (3–4) ===
Legend ATP Challenger (0–1) ITF Futures (3–3)	Finals by surface Hard (0–1) Clay (2–2) Grass (0–0) Carpet (1–1)

Result	W–L	Date	Tournament	Tier	Surface	Opponent	Score
Loss	0–1	Aug 2005	Russia F3, Korolev	Futures	Clay	(New Zealand) Artem Sitak	6–4, 4–6, 4–6
Loss	0–2	May 2007	Fergana, Uzbekistan	Challenger	Hard	(France) Antony Dupuis	1–6, 4–6
Win	1–2	Sep 2007	Russia F6, Sergiyev Posad	Futures	Clay	(Russia) Mikhail Elgin	7–6^{(7–5)}, 3–6, 6–3
Loss	1–3	Sep 2007	Russia F7, Balashikha	Futures	Clay	(Russia) Mikhail Elgin	2–6, 6–4, 4–6
Win	2–3	Nov 2007	Iran F4, Kish Island	Futures	Clay	(Slovakia) Marek Semjan	6–4, 6–2
Win	3–3	Apr 2008	Russia F2, Tyumen	Futures	Carpet	(Ukraine) Illya Marchenko	7–6^{(7–4)}, 6–4
Loss	3–4	Apr 2009	Russia F2, Tyumen	Futures	Carpet	(Slovakia) Lukáš Lacko	3–6, 7–5, 4–6

=== Doubles: 9 (6–3) ===
Legend ATP Challenger (2–1) ITF Futures (4–2)	Finals by surface Hard (4–02) Clay (2–0) Grass (0–0) Carpet (0–1)

Result	W–L	Date	Tournament	Tier	Surface	Partner	Opponents	Score
Win	1–0	May 2007	Uzbekistan F1, Andijan	Futures	Hard	(Russia) Victor Kozin	(Uzbekistan) Murad Inoyatov (Uzbekistan) Denis Istomin	7–6^{(7–5)}, 6–7^{(4–7)}, 6–3
Win	2–0	Jun 2007	Ukraine F2, Cherkassy	Futures	Clay	(Russia) Victor Kozin	(Latvia) Deniss Pavlovs (Serbia) Goran Tošić	4–6, 6–1, 6–4
Win	3–0	Sep 2007	Russia F6, Sergiyev Posad	Futures	Clay	(Russia) Victor Kozin	(Russia) Mikhail Elgin (Russia) Dmitri Vlasov	6–2, 6–2
Loss	3–1	Dec 2007	New Delhi, India	Challenger	Hard	(Russia) Mikhail Elgin	(China) Yu Xinyuan (China) Zeng Shaoxuan	3–6, 3–6
Win	4–1	Feb 2008	USA F4, Brownsville	Futures	Hard	(United States) Phillip Simmonds	(India) Sunil-Kumar Sipaeya (South Korea) Daniel Yoo	6–3, 6–2
Win	5–1	Aug 2008	Bukhara, Uzbekistan	Challenger	Hard	(Russia) Mikhail Elgin	(Poland) Łukasz Kubot (Austria) Oliver Marach	7–6^{(7–2)}, 6–1
Loss	5–2	Oct 2008	Nigeria F3, Lagos	Futures	Hard	(Russia) Pavel Katliarov	(India) Rohan Gajjar (India) Divij Sharan	6–7^{(6–8)}, 7–6^{(7–2)}, [7–10]
Loss	5–3	Apr 2009	Russia F1, Moscow	Futures	Carpet	(Russia) Valery Rudnev	(Russia) Konstantin Kravchuk (Slovakia) Lukáš Lacko	2–6, 4–6
Win	6–3	May 2009	Fergana, Uzbekistan	Challenger	Hard	(Kazakhstan) Alexey Kedryuk	(Canada) Pierre-Ludovic Duclos (Pakistan) Aisam Qureshi	4–6, 6–3, [10–5]
