= Almaty Cup =

Defunct tennis tournament
- Location: Almaty, Kazakhstan
- Category: ATP Challenger Tour
- Surface: Clay / Outdoors (2007–08); Hard / Outdoors (2009)
- Draw: 32S/20Q/16D
- Prize money: $50,000

The Almaty Cup was a tennis tournament held in Almaty, Kazakhstan from 2007 until 2009. The event was part of the Association of Tennis Professionals Challenger Tour and was played on clay courts until its final edition in 2009, which was on outdoor hardcourts. There were two editions in 2007.

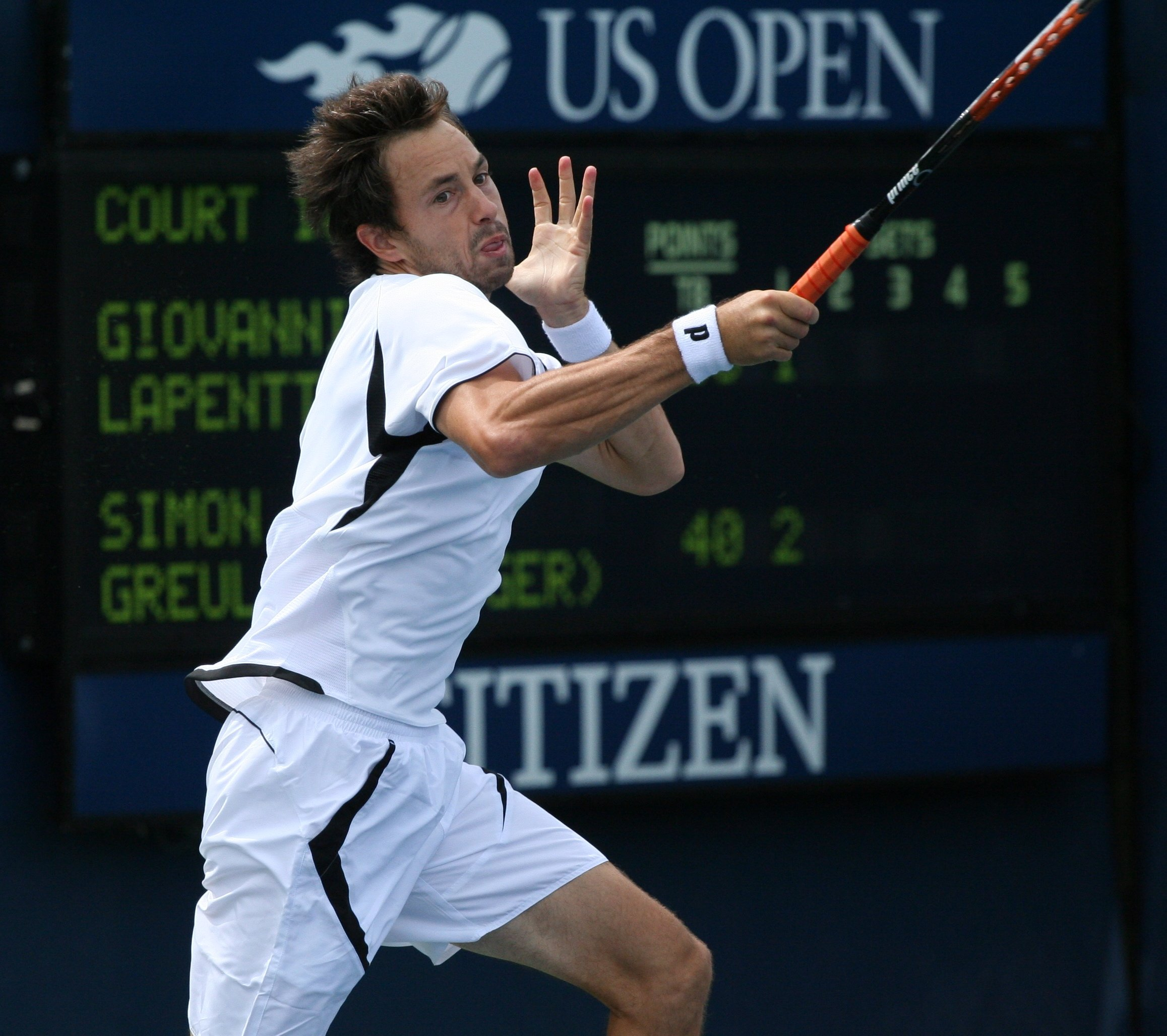
German player Simon Greul won the first edition of this tournament. He defeated his compatriot Daniel Brands in the 2007 final match.

== Past finals ==
=== Singles ===
Year	Champion	Runner-up	Score
2009	(Ukraine) Ivan Sergeyev	(Jamaica) Dustin Brown	6–3, 5–7, 6–4
2008	(Argentina) Sebastián Decoud	(United States) Alex Bogomolov Jr.	6–4, 6–2
2007 (2)	(Germany) Simon Greul	(South Korea) Jun Woong-sun	6–3, 6–2
2007 (1)	(Germany) Simon Greul	(Germany) Daniel Brands	6–4, 6–2

=== Doubles ===
Year	Champion	Runner-up	Score
2009	(Ukraine) Denys Molchanov (Chinese Taipei) Yang Tsung-hua	(Canada) Pierre-Ludovic Duclos (Kazakhstan) Alexey Kedryuk	4–6, 7–6^{(7–5)}, [11–9]
2008	(Russia) Alexandre Krasnoroutskiy (Ukraine) Denys Molchanov	(Kazakhstan) Syrym Abdukhalikov (Russia) Alex Bogomolov Jr.	3–6, 6–3, [10–2]
2007 (2)	(Romania) Teodor-Dacian Crăciun (Romania) Florin Mergea	(Kazakhstan) Alexey Kedryuk (Russia) Alexander Kudryavtsev	6–2, 6–1
2007 (1)	(Slovakia) Kamil Čapkovič (Croatia) Ivan Dodig	(Kazakhstan) Alexey Kedryuk (Russia) Alexander Kudryavtsev	6–4, 3–6, [10–7]

== See also ==
- Almaty Challenger
