= Guzal Yusupova =

Uzbekistani tennis player (born 1997)

Guzal Yusupova Гузаль Юсупова
- Country (sports): Uzbekistan
- Born: 19 December 1997 (age 27) Qarshi, Uzbekistan
- Plays: Right handed (two-handed backhand)
- College: Syracuse University
- Prize money: $11,872

Singles
- Career record: 21–42
- Career titles: 0
- Highest ranking: No. 641 (31 December 2018)
- Current ranking: No. 950 (25 July 2016)

Doubles
- Career record: 20–37
- Career titles: 0
- Highest ranking: No. 697 (18 August 2014)
- Current ranking: No. 740 (25 July 2016)
- Last updated on: 25 July 2016.

Guzal Yusupova (Uzbek: Гузаль Юсупова; born 19 December 1997) is an Uzbekistani tennis player.

Yusupova has a career high WTA singles ranking of 746 achieved on 8 September 2014. She also has a career high WTA doubles ranking of 697 achieved on 18 August 2014.

Yusupova made her WTA main draw debut at the 2013 Tashkent Open in the doubles draw partnering Arina Folts.
