= Caversham International Tennis Tournament =

ATP Challenger Tour
- Location: Jersey, Channel Islands
- Category: ATP Challenger Tour
- Surface: Carpet
- Draw: 32S/17Q/16D
- Prize money: $42,000+H

The Caversham International Tennis Tournament was a professional tennis tournament played on carpet. It was a part of the ATP Challenger Tour. It was held in Jersey, Channel Islands, from 2008 to 2009.

== Past finals ==
=== Singles ===
Year	Champion	Runner-up	Score	Ref.
2009	(Finland) Jarkko Nieminen	(France) Stéphane Robert	4–6, 6–1, 7–5	
2008	(France) Adrian Mannarino	(Germany) Andreas Beck	7–6(4), 7–6(4)	

=== Doubles ===
Year	Champions	Runners-up	Score	Ref.
2009	(Denmark) Frederik Nielsen (Australia) Joseph Sirianni	(Finland) Henri Kontinen (Finland) Jarkko Nieminen	7–5, 3–6, [10–2]	
2008	(United Kingdom) Colin Fleming (United Kingdom) Ken Skupski	(Australia) Chris Guccione (Brazil) Márcio Torres	6–3, 6–2	
