= 2012 Fergana Challenger =

- Date: 14–20 May
- Edition: 13th
- Surface: Hard
- Location: Fergana, Uzbekistan

Champions

Singles
- (India) Yuki Bhambri

Doubles
- (South Africa) Raven Klaasen / (South Africa) Izak van der Merwe
← 2011 ·	Fergana Challenger	· 2013 →

The 2012 Fergana Challenger was a professional tennis tournament played on hard courts. It was the 13th edition of the tournament which was part of the 2012 ATP Challenger Tour. It took place in Fergana, Uzbekistan, between 14 and 20 May 2012.

== Singles main-draw entrants ==
=== Seeds ===
Country	Player	Rank^{1}	Seed
SVK	Karol Beck	112	1
SUI	Marco Chiudinelli	136	2
RSA	Izak van der Merwe	162	3
ISR	Amir Weintraub	185	4
RUS	Konstantin Kravchuk	188	5
TPE	Jimmy Wang	192	6
GBR	Jamie Baker	215	7
UKR	Denys Molchanov	251	8
UZB	Farrukh Dustov	267	9

- ^{1} Rankings on 7 May 2012.

=== Other entrants ===
The following players received wildcards into the singles main draw:

- (Uzbekistan) Sarvar Ikramov
- (Uzbekistan) Murad Inoyatov
- (Uzbekistan) Sergey Shipilov
- (Uzbekistan) Nigmat Shofayziev

The following players received entry from the qualifying draw:

- (Kyrgyzstan) Daniiar Duldaev
- (Russia) Mikhail Ledovskikh
- (Uzbekistan) Batyr Sapaev
- (Uzbekistan) Vaja Uzakov

The following players received entry as a lucky loser:

- (Russia) Nikoloz Basilashvili

== Champions ==
=== Singles ===
- (India) Yuki Bhambri def. (Israel) Amir Weintraub, 6–3, 6–3

=== Doubles ===
- (South Africa) Raven Klaasen / (South Africa) Izak van der Merwe def. (Thailand) Sanchai Ratiwatana / (Thailand) Sonchat Ratiwatana, 6–3, 6–4
