= Pierre-Ludovic Duclos =

Canadian tennis player (born 1986)

- Country (sports): Canada
- Residence: Quebec City, Quebec, Canada
- Born: January 8, 1986 (age 40) Quebec City, Quebec, Canada
- Height: 1.85 m (6.1 ft)
- Turned pro: 2007
- Retired: 2012
- Plays: Right-handed (two-handed backhand)
- Prize money: US $206,342

Singles
- Career record: 1–3 (ATP Tour level, Grand Slam level, and Davis Cup)
- Career titles: 0
- Highest ranking: No. 229 (February 13, 2012)

Grand Slam singles results
- Australian Open: Q2 (2012)

Doubles
- Career record: 1–3 (ATP Tour level, Grand Slam level, and Davis Cup)
- Career titles: 0
- Highest ranking: No. 121 (November 16, 2009)

Pierre-Ludovic Duclos-Lasnier, commonly referred to as Pierre-Ludovic Duclos, (born January 8, 1986) is a Canadian former professional tour tennis player. In 2014 he was sentenced to six-years in prison for attempting to have a sexual encounter with a 13-year-old girl.

Duclos has appeared in six ATP World Tour main draw matches, winning one of two singles matches and one of three in doubles. He has also captured four ATP Challenger events, all in doubles.

== Personal life ==
Duclos was born in Quebec City, Quebec. He is 1.78 metres tall, 77 kg in weight, and plays right-handed with a two handed backhand. He has indicated that his favourite surface is hard court. Duclos was coached by Italian Donato Campagnoli.

=== Attempted sexual encounter and conviction ===
On 9 or 10 February 2013, Duclos and a 13-year-old girl met when they were playing on adjacent courts, according to the arrest report by the Manatee County Sheriff’s office. The girl was looking for a tennis coach when she met Duclos. According to the Manatee County documents, Duclos was aware of the girl's age. Duclos proceeded to text the girl with sexual advances, as well as sending two photos of his penis.

On 21 February 2013, in Bradenton, Florida, Duclos was arrested in a sting operation after the girl's mother gave her cellphone to police. Duclos had agreed to meet the girl at a Starbucks and bring her back to his home for sexual intercourse. At a trial in May 2014, Duclos was convicted and sentenced to six years in a Florida prison and four years probation, for attempting to have a sexual encounter with a 13-year-old girl.

== Tennis career ==
=== 2003 – 2005 ===
Duclos played in his first professional tour tournament in August 2003, reaching the second round of the Brazil F5 Futures tournament. The following year he played in ten futures and one challenger tournament (all but one in and from August) and finished 2004 World No. 1170. He played in 18 Futures in 2005, reaching the final in one, Mexico F16 in October, and the quarter-finals in four others. He finished his year losing in the first round of the Puebla challenger to Mexican No. 1 Bruno Echagaray in three sets and as the World No. 723.

=== 2006 – 2007 ===
For 2006, Duclos played 13 Futures and 6 challengers. He reached the semi-finals of Mexico F7 and Mexico F19, and the quarters of Mexico F17. He finished the World No.~640 and without yet having won a match at the challenger level. The story was different in doubles however, as Duclos reached the semi-finals in consecutive challengers in April played in Mexico and then, partnering André Ghem, won a third. He won Mexico F7, partnering Echagaray, reached the semis of the Yuba City challenger, won Mexico F17 with Raphael Durek, and reached the semis of the Maui.

Duclos began 2007 by winning his first Futures in doubles, Mexico F2, and then reaching the finals of his second tournament, Portugal F1 in both singles and doubles. He won the doubles of Portugal F2 and F3 partnering Niels Desein and Franko Škugor respectively. In April Duclos reached consecutive quarterfinals at two Futures in the U.A.E. as well as the tourney's finals in doubles. He then in May reached consecutive semis in two Futures in Belarus in singles and his ranking then stood at World No. 526. Duclos won Ireland F1 in doubles with Durek and followed this up with his first challenger level win, in Dublin, over Slovak Igor Zelenay.

Following a first round loss at the Granby Challenger, where he reached the semis in doubles, Duclos scored his most impressive victory to date, a comeback three-set win over Spaniard Feliciano López in qualifying for the 2007 Rogers Cup. Unfortunately, the Quebecer failed to qualify losing soundly in the qualifying round to Italian Fabio Fognini, 2–6, 2–6. In doubles partnering compatriot Philip Bester he lost in his first ATP Tour-level main draw match, 4–6, 4–6 to Lleyton Hewitt and Rafael Nadal. Duclos then reached three straight Futures quarterfinals, at France F12, Spain F34, and Spain F35. He had won his first tour title in the following week, winning Spain F36 by defeating World No. 369 Guillermo Alcaide in the semis and World No. 359 Miguel Ángel López Jaén in the final in straight sets. He also won the doubles partnering Daniel Lustig. Luclos's singles ranking jumped to World No. 388, his second highest to date. He finished the year though losing in the first round of three straight challengers in singles, but reached the finals in consecutive tournaments in doubles and a world ranking of No. 208, also a career high.

=== 2008 ===
Duclos's 2008 season picked up in June as he won doubles at the Belarus F2, where he also reached the quarters in singles. In July he reached the semis of Turkey F7, losing to eventual champion Marsel İlhan. Duclos then won Syria F1, where he won all his matches handily, 2 and 2 over his first round opponent, 2 and 2 again in the second round, 5 and 1 in the quarters, 2 and love in the semis and 4 and 1 in the final, a win over Riccardo Ghedin. He reached the quarters of Syria F2 and won Senegal F1, as the top seed, at the end of July / first of August, defeating No. 2 seed Niels Desein in the final. He also teamed with Desein to form the top seeded doubles tandem and won the tournament. He lost in the final of Senegal F2 to Desein, retiring at 3–3 in the first set, and the pair, for a second consecutive event, won doubles. With this success, Duclos reached a career high singles ATP entry ranking of World No. 337.

After a few weeks off, Duclos has resumed where he left off, defeating World No. 283 Thomas Oger in the finals 6–3, 6–0, to win Italy F28 and reach a career ranking of World No. 302, which he has since bettered. He and Desein again won the doubles, as the top seeded pair. Duclos then withdrew, during the first week of September, from his second round match of France F13, as the tournament No. 6 seed. After a near two-month lay-off he rolled to the final of Spain F42 as the No. 3 seed, not losing more than 4 games in any set. He dropped the final however to Yannick Mertens, the No. 6 seed, 6–4, 2–6, 3–6. Then after losing in the first round of Spain F43 Duclos, as the tournament No. 3 seed, lost in the quarterfinals twice in consecutive tournaments, Israel F4 and F5.

=== 2009 ===
Duclos began his 2009 in early February playing Ivory Coast F1 and F2, winning one match and losing two. He fared far better in the doubles as he and partner Andreas Haider-Maurer won F1 and lost the final of F2. In late February he qualified for the Wolfsburg challenger, and lost the second round of the main draw to Alex Bogdanovic 3–6, 6–4, 5–7. The following week he qualified for the Bergamo challenger and lost in the first round of the main draw. In mid-March he failed to qualify for the Marrakech challenger. The following week he lost in the first round of the main draw of the Sarajevo challenger. In doubles, partnering Nicholas Monroe, Duclos lost in the semi-finals.

In early April, the No. 2 seed Duclos reached the quarterfinals of Russia F1 in singles while in doubles he and partner Denis Matsukevich lost in the semis. After reaching the second round of Russia F2, he qualified for the main draw of the Aegean Tennis Cup, losing in the first round to Prakash Amritraj. Duclos next qualified for the main draw of the Israel Open, but again lost in the first round. In doubles there he and partner Thiago Alves also succumbed in their first main draw match. Duclos next lost in singles in the final round of qualifying for the Türk Telecom İzmir Cup.

Duclos saw his ranking rise to a career best in May as he reached the quarter-finals of the Fergana Challenger, defeating tournament No. 7 seed and World No. 275 Kamil Čapkovič in straight sets in the first round before falling to No. 4 seed Illya Marchenko in 3 sets in the quarters. This result saw him move one place past long-time Canada No. 2 Peter Polansky in the ATP rankings to a career high World No. 278. He showed well in Fergana in doubles too, as he and partner Aisam-ul-Haq Qureshi reached the final. The following week Duclos failed to qualify for the main draw of Alessandria Challenger in singles and in doubles reached the quarter-finals partnering Jacopo Marchegiani.

In June, Duclos reached the second round in singles at the Sunset Moulding YCRC Challenger, scoring a first-round win of veteran and No. 1 seed Vince Spadea before falling in his next match to another veteran, Cecil Mamiit. This allowed him to reach a new career high singles ranking of World No. 270, but he has been displaced by Polanksy as the number two singles player in Canada thanks to the latter's good showing in qualifying for the main draw of the French Open. Duclos continued his fine doubles play, reaching the semi-finals in Yuba City partnering Alex Kuznetsov.

Duclos lost in the first round of the Lines Trophy to Thomas Fabbiano in late June, and then again, the following week, to World No. 227 Ruben Bemelmans of Belgium, in the opening round of the Open Diputación challenger. He received his career highest singles record this week too, of World No. 259. In doubles, Duclos lost in the first round in Reggio Emilia and the second round in Pozoblanco, partnering Mario Torres and Lukáš Lacko respectively. The week after, he reached the second round of the Manchester Trophy, defeating World No. 1766 Ashley Hewitt 6–2, 6–0 before falling to No. 7 seed Lacko 4–6, 4–6. He dropped in the rankings, however, some 23 spots because of the ATP ranking points he had last year for winning the Futures event in Damascus last July became more than a year old this week. In doubles in Manchester, Duclos and partner Lacko reached the semi-finals.

The week after, Duclos lost to Izak van der Merwe in the first round of the Fifth Third Bank Tennis Championships, 4–6, 6–3, 0–6. In doubles, he and partner Nick Monroe lost in the first round. The following week at the Granby Challenger he eked out a three set win over No. 3 seed Brendan Evans in the first round, 6–2, 1–6, 7–5, before falling in the second round to Ryler DeHeart 5–7, 5–7. In doubles Duclos played with Alexander Kudryavtsev and reached the second round. Last week Duclos defeated No. 6 seed Kevin Anderson in the first round of the main draw of the Odlum Brown Vancouver Open, 6–3, 4–6, 6–4. In the second round he fell to eventual finalist Xavier Malisse 6–3, 0–6, 4–6. In doubles he and partner Vasek Pospisil lost in the first round.

Duclos received a wild card into qualifying for the Rogers Cup being played last week in Montreal. He lost to No. 3 seed Andrey Golubev 2–6, 2–6. In doubles, Duclos and compatriot Frank Dancevic, a wild card pairing, lost in the second round of the main draw. The following week Duclos lost in three sets to No. 2 seed Illya Marchenko in the first round of the Karsi Challenger in Uzbekistan. In doubles, he and partner Denis Molchanov, the top-seeded doubles entry, lost in the second round. The week after Duclos reached the semi-finals of the Southern Capital Cup in Astana, knocking off top seed Michail Elgin in the first round, James McGee in the second, and No. 7 seed Greg Jones in the quarters, 6–2, 7–5, before falling to No. 3 seed and eventual champion Ivan Sergeyev in two tie-breaks. In doubles, Duclos and partner Alexey Kedryuk are the top seeds lost in the finals.

After a week off, Duclos, as the No. 6 seed, lost in the quarter-finals of France F14, in Mulhouse, having defeated qualifier Baptiste Maitre and World No. 438 Rabie Chaki before falling to No. 3 seed Alexander Kudryavtsev. In doubles, Duclos and Niels Desein, the top seeds, lost in the second round. The week after he lost in the first round of the Sicilia Classic Mancuso Company Cup, comprehensively to Miguel Ángel López Jaén (2 and 2). In doubles, Duclos and partner Rogério Dutra Da Silva, the No. 4 seeds, lost in the final. After being off another week, Duclos reached the semi-finals of France F17 as the No. 4 seed. In doubles, he and partner Olivier Charroin, the No. 1 seeds, also reached the semis.

In late October, Duclos reached the quarterfinals of France F19 in singles as the No. 4 seed. In doubles, he and partner Desein won the title as the top seed. After a week off, Duclos lost to No. 8 seed Mikhail Kukushkin in the first round of the President's Cup challenger, 4–6, 3–6. In doubles, he and partner Lester Cook, unseeded, lost in the first round. In the second week of November Duclos lost to No. 3 seed Stéphane Robert in the first round of the Caversham International Tennis Tournament, 3–6, 4–6. In doubles, he and partner Joshua Goodall, unseeded, lost in the semi-finals.

Duclos finished 2009 ranked World No. 357 in singles and No. 142 in doubles.

=== 2010 ===
Duclos was not in action during the opening week of tournaments. The following week he qualified for the singles main draw at the 2010 Challenger Salinas Diario Expreso challenger, but lost in the first round of the main to fellow qualifier Iván Endara. In doubles, he and his partner, doubles specialist Andreas Siljestrom, lost in the first round to the No. 2 seeds Jonathan Marray and Jamie Murray, 4–6, 4–6.

Two weeks later Duclos, unseeded, lost in singles qualifying for the Honolulu Challenger in the second round, to No. 5 seed Nikola Mektic 3–6, 4–6. In doubles he and partner Siljestrom, the No. 4 seeds, lost in the first round. The following week Duclos was unseeded in the main draw of the McDonald's Burnie International challenger, where he defeated unseeded Australians Kaden Hensel and Sadik Kadur in the first and second rounds, before losing to yet another unseeded Australian in the quarter-finals, Joseph Sirianni, 6–7, 3–6. In doubles, he and partner Henri Kontinen, the No. 3 seeds, lost in the first round.

After a week off, Duclos reached the second round of qualifying for the Delray Beach International ATP 250 tournament, where he lost in three sets to No. 8 seed Carlos Salamanca 6–4, 4–6, 5–7. Off the following week, Duclos, the No. 5 seed, lost to top-seeded Filip Prpic in the qualifying round of the BH Telecom Indoors challenger, 5–7, 6–3, 5–7. In doubles, he and partner Stefano Galvani reached the second round of the main draw.

In late March, Duclos lost in the second round of the Challenger Banque Nationale in Rimouski, to former World No. 198 Martin Slanar. In doubles, he and fellow Canadian Peter Polansky lost in the first round. The following week Duclos lost in the first round of the 2010 Abierto Internacional del Bicentenario Leon, to unseeded Alexander Sadecky. In doubles, he and Nicholas Monroe reached the semi-finals, where they fell to the top seeds, Vasek Pospisil and Santiago González in tie-breaker set. After a week off, Duclos and partner Ryler DeHeart won the doubles title of the 2010 Manta Open, while in singles Duclos lost to DeHeart, the No. 7 seed, in the second the round.

After a week off, Duclos reached the quarter-finals of the 2010 Busan Open Challenger Tennis. In doubles he and partner Yang Tsung-hua, seeded No. 3, lost in the finals. Two weeks previously, Duclos reached the second round of the 2010 Fergana Challenger, losing to Chinese qualifier Zhang Ze in three sets. Again partnering with Yang in doubles, the pair could not repeat the success of the previous week and lost in the first round, despite being the No. 2 seeds. After a week off, Duclos lost in the first round, as an alternate entry, to fellow Canadian Peter Polansky, in the 2010 Weil Tennis Academy Challenger. He and partner John Paul Fruttero also lost in the first round in doubles.

After three weeks off, Duclos played one of his best tournaments on tour, qualifying to reach the second round of the 2010 Nielsen Pro Tennis Championship in singles while winning the doubles. Beating Juan-Manuel Elizondo and Luka Gregorc, both in straight sets, in qualifying, he defeated Dominican Republic No. 1 Víctor Estrella in the round of 32 before losing narrowly in the round of 16 to Björn Phau, 3–6 in the third set. Duclos then claimed the doubles crown by partnering Ryler DeHeart to the tandem's second challenger title in just two times playing together. After a week off, Duclos lost in the qualifying round for the 2010 Comerica Bank Challenger, despite being the No. 2 seed. In doubles, he and partner Artem Sitak, the No. 4 seeds, lost in the second round. Last week Duclos, the No. 1 seed in qualifying, qualified for the main singles draw of the 2010 Fifth Third Bank Tennis Championships where he defeated unseeded Yuichi Sugita in the first round, 6–4, 2–6, 6–3 before losing to No. 4 seed Kevin Kim in the next after, despite winning a first set tiebreak. In doubles, he and partner Nick Monroe lost their first round match despite being the No. 4 seeds.

Duclos lost to No. 1 seed and eventual champion Tobias Kamke, 3–6, 4–6, in the first round of the 2010 Challenger Banque Nationale de Granby, an event that features the top eight ranked (active) Canadian singles players. In doubles, Duclos and partner Igor Sijsling also lost their first round match. The following week Duclos was the No. 6 seed in the 2010 Beijing International Challenger, where he lost his opening match, to World No. 431 Gong Maoxin 6–1, 3–6, 6–7^{(4)}. He and partner Artem Sitak however, the No. 2 seeds, took the doubles title, Duclos's fourth at the Challenger level.

Pierre-Ludovic was also granted a wild card into the singles draw of the 2010 Rogers Cup, one of four Canadians. He lost his first round encounter with Yen-Hsun Lu, 4–6, 4–6. It was his first main draw experience in singles in an ATP World Tour event. He did not play doubles. Off for three weeks, Duclos next lost, in early September, in the first round in singles at the 2010 Trophée des Alpilles, to Vincent Millot 4–6, 4–6. In doubles, he and partner Uladzimir Ignatik, the No. 3 seeds, lost in the semi-finals. Pierre-Ludovic then again fell in the first round in singles, this time to Alex Kuznetsov 4–6, 3–6, at the 2010 USTA Challenger of Oklahoma. In doubles he and partner Vasek Pospisil, the No. 2 seeds, lost the semi-finals.

After a week off Duclos was the No. 4 seed at Canada F4, at Rexall Centre, where he lost in the quarter-finals to No. 7 seed Nicholas Monroe, 6–4, 6–7^{(10)}, 3–6. He and Monroe were in fact the No. 1 seeds in the doubles competition, but the pair lost in the quarters, to compatriots Frank Dancevic and Vasek Pospisil. After a week off, Duclos qualified, as the No. 3 seed, for the singles main draw of the 2010 Natomas Men's Professional Tennis Tournament. He lost to No. 3 seed Julian Reister in the opening round, 6–1, 2–6, 3–6. In doubles, he and partner Ryler DeHeart, the No. 3 seeds, reached the quarter-finals.

The following week Duclos won three singles matched to qualify for the 2010 Royal Bank of Scotland Challenger in Tiburon, California. In the main draw he lost to his doubles partner DeHeart 6–3, 4–6, 3–6, in the first round. He and DeHeart, the No. 3 seeds, lost in doubles in the final. The week after, Pierre-Ludovic entered the 2010 Calabasas Pro Tennis Championships just in doubles, again partnering DeHeart. The No. 1 seeds, they went out in the semi-finals to the No. 4 seeds Rik de Voest and Bobby Reynolds. The following week Duclos lost in the qualifying round in singles qualifying, to Yuki Bhambri after winning the first set, for the next USTA-sponsored challenger, the 2010 Virginia National Bank Men's Pro Championship. He is again playing doubles with DeHeart and the No. 4 seeds have lost the final.

The following week, the second of November, Duclos only entered in doubles at the 2010 Knoxville Challenger. He and DeHeart, the No. 4 seeded team, lost in the first round. The week after, at the 2010 JSM Challenger of Champaign–Urbana, Duclos lost in the second round of singles qualifying to unranked American Marek Czerwinski. In doubles he and DeHeart, the top seeds, lost the final. Pierre-Ludovic finished 2010 ranked World No. 433 in singles and No. 127 in doubles.

=== 2011 ===
At the half-way point of 2011, Duclos has come on strong of late in singles while having had a consistently okay year in doubles. He most successful doubles partnership has been with Ivo Klec. The pair have played together in two Challengers and reached the semi-finals in one, the Czech Open, and the finals of the 2011 Jalisco Open in June.

In Guadalajara, Duclos played his best ever singles tour event as well, reaching the tournament final as a lucky loser entrant. He had lost to the most recent ITF junior tour champion Juan Sebastián Gómez in the qualifying round before going on to beat top-200 players Carlos Salamanca and João Souza in the quarter and semi-finals of the main draw. Having already played seven singles and three doubles matches in six days, Duclos went down rather easily in the final to No. 2 seed Paul Capdeville, 5–7, 1–6. His other significant singles result so far was qualifying and then reaching the quarter-finals of the 2011 Sarasota Open. His success in May and June has seen his singles ranking return to well inside the top 400. In doubles, in addition to the Guadalajara finals, Duclos reached three semi-finals and three quarter-finals in eleven Challenger events played.

Duclos began July by losing in the second round of singles qualifying for the 2011 Campbell's Hall of Fame Championships. He did not participate in doubles. The following week he lost in the first round in singles at the 2011 Comerica Bank Challenger, as an Alternate entrant, in three sets to No. 6 seed Carsten Ball. A week later Duclos fared far better, reaching the semi-finals of the 2011 Fifth Third Bank Tennis Championships, again as an Alternate. After a week off, Duclos began August by going out in the first round of the 2011 Odlum Brown Vancouver Open, in three sets to fellow Quebecer Érik Chvojka. In all four North American Challengers he competed in doubles, from late June to early August, he lost in the first round.

Duclos lost in the first round of qualifying at the 2011 Rogers Cup, to Matthew Ebden 4–6, 6–7^{(4)}. In doubles, he and Chvojka lost a close first round match to Andy and Jamie Murray. After a week off, Duclos beat Chvojka 3–6, 6–2, 6–1 and Michael McClune 7–6, 7–6 before falling to No. 3 seed Ricardo Mello in qualifying for the ATP 250 2011 Winston-Salem Open. At the last moment he was entered as a Lucky Loser replacing Kevin Anderson, and managed to defeat World No. 67 Ryan Harrison 7–5, 7–5. Taking advantage of Harrison's poor first serve percentage, Duclos serve and volleyed as often as he could, to surprise the up-and-coming American. This result will see him crack the top 300 for the first time since November, 2009. He next faces No. 10 seed Robin Haase.

== Singles titles (3) ==
Legend (singles)
Grand Slam (0)
Tennis Masters Cup (0)
ATP Masters Series (0)
ATP Tour (0)
Challengers (0)
Futures (3)

No.	Date	Tournament	Surface	Opponent	Score
1.	September 24, 2007	Spain F36 (Martos)	Hard	(Spain) Miguel Ángel López Jaén	6–4, 7–6^{(9–7)}
2.	July 7, 2008	Syria F1 (Damascus)	Hard	(Italy) Riccardo Ghedin	6–4, 6–1
3.	July 28, 2008	Senegal F1 (Dakar)	Hard	(Belgium) Niels Desein	6–3, 7–5

== Doubles titles (21) ==
Legend (doubles)
Grand Slam (0)
ATP World Tour Masters 1000 (0)
ATP World Tour 500 (0)
ATP World Tour 250 (0)
ATP Challengers (5)
ITF Futures (16)

No.	Date	Tournament	Surface	Partner	Opponent	Score
1.	11 July 2005	U.S.A. F17 (Peoria)	Clay (Outdoor)	(Brazil) Alexandre Simoni	(United States) David Martin (United States) Jeremy Wurtzman	6–3, 7–6^{(7)}
2.	6 March 2006	U.S.A. F6 (McAllen, Texas)	Hard (Outdoor)	(South Africa) Wesley Whitehouse	(Netherlands) Michel Koning (Netherlands) Steven Korteling	6–3, 6–4
3.	24 April 2006	Mexico City Challenger, (Mexico City)	Hard (Outdoor)	(Brazil) André Ghem	(South Africa) Rik de Voest (United States) Glenn Weiner	6–4, 0–6, [10–3]
4.	15 May 2006	Mexico F7 (Guadalajara)	Clay (Outdoor)	(Mexico) Bruno Echagaray	(Mexico) Eduardo Peralta-Tello (Mexico) Víctor Romero	6–3, 6–3
5.	9 October 2006	Mexico F17	Hard (Outdoor)	(Australia) Raphael Durek	(Mexico) Miguel Gallardo-Valles (Mexico) Carlos Palencia	6–2, 6–4
6.	12 February 2007	Mexico F2	Hard (Outdoor)	(France) Pierrick Ysern	(Netherlands) Floris Kilian (Netherlands) Boy Westerhof	0–6, 7–6^{(2)}, [10–3]
7.	5 March 2007	Portugal F2	Hard (Outdoor)	(Belgium) Niels Desein	(Uzbekistan) Murad Inoyatov (Russia) Dmitri Sitak	6–3, 6–4
8.	12 March 2007	Portugal F3	Hard (Outdoor)	(Croatia) Franko Škugor	(Spain) Luis Antonio Perez-Perez (Spain) Sergio Pérez-Pérez	6–1, 6–0
9.	18 June 2007	Ireland F1	Carpet (Outdoor)	(Australia) Raphael Durek	(Republic of Ireland) Barry King (Republic of Ireland) Colin O'Brien	7–5, 7–6^{(2)}
10.	24 September 2007	Spain F36	Hard (Outdoor)	(Czech Republic) Daniel Lustig	(Spain) Miguel Ángel López Jaén (Spain) Sergio Pérez-Pérez	7–5, 5–7, [10–5]
11.	16 June 2008	Belarus F2	Hard (Outdoor)	(Russia) Dmitri Sitak	(Russia) Sergei Demekhine (Belarus) Pavel Katliarov	7–5, 6–4
12.	28 July 2008	Senegal F1	Hard (Outdoor)	(Belgium) Niels Desein	(Monaco) Benjamin Balleret (France) Philippe De Bonnevie	7–5, 6–7^{(3)}, [10–5]
13.	4 August 2008	Senegal F2	Hard (Outdoor)	(Belgium) Niels Desein	(Monaco) Benjamin Balleret (France) Philippe De Bonnevie	6–4, 6–4
14.	25 August 2008	Italy F28	Clay (Outdoor)	(Belgium) Niels Desein	(China) Yan Bai (China) Jun-Chao Xun	6–3, 6–3
15.	24 November 2008	Israel F5	Hard (Outdoor)	(Israel) Amir Hadad	(Germany) Sebastian Rieschick (Israel) Amir Weintraub	6–3, 6–4
16.	2 February 2009	Ivory Coast F1	Hard (Outdoor)	(Austria) Andreas Haider-Maurer	(Germany) Andre Begemann (Portugal) Leonardo Tavares	6–1, 6–7^{(5)}, [14–12]
17.	19 October 2009	France F19	Hard (Indoor)	(Belgium) Niels Desein	(France) Fabrice Martin (Canada) Adil Shamasdin	7–6^{(8)}, 1–6, [10–5]
18.	24 April 2010	Manta Open – Trofeo Ricardo Delgado Aray	Hard (Outdoor)	(United States) Ryler DeHeart	(Germany) Martin Emmrich (Sweden) Andreas Siljeström	6–4, 7–5
19.	28 June 2010	Nielsen Pro Tennis Championship (Winnetka)	Hard (Outdoor)	(United States) Ryler DeHeart	(South Africa) Rik de Voest (India) Somdev Devvarman	7–6^{(4)}, 4–6, [10–8]
20.	28 August 2010	2010 Beijing International Challenger (Beijing)	Hard (Outdoor)	(Russia) Artem Sitak	(Australia) Sadik Kadir (India) Purav Raja	7–6^{(4)}, 7–6^{(5)}
21.	2 September 2011	2011 Chang-Sat Bangkok Open (Bangkok)	Hard (Outdoor)	(Italy) Riccardo Ghedin	(United States) Nicholas Monroe (France) Ludovic Walter	6–4, 6–4
