= Fergana Challenger =

Defunct tennis tournament
- Event name: Fergana
- Location: Fergana, Uzbekistan
- Venue: Istiklol Tennis Club
- Surface: Hard
- Website: website
ATP Tour
- Category: ATP Challenger Tour
- Draw: 32S/28Q/16D
- Prize money: $50,000
WTA Tour
- Category: ITF Women's Circuit
- Draw: 32S/16D
- Prize money: $25,000

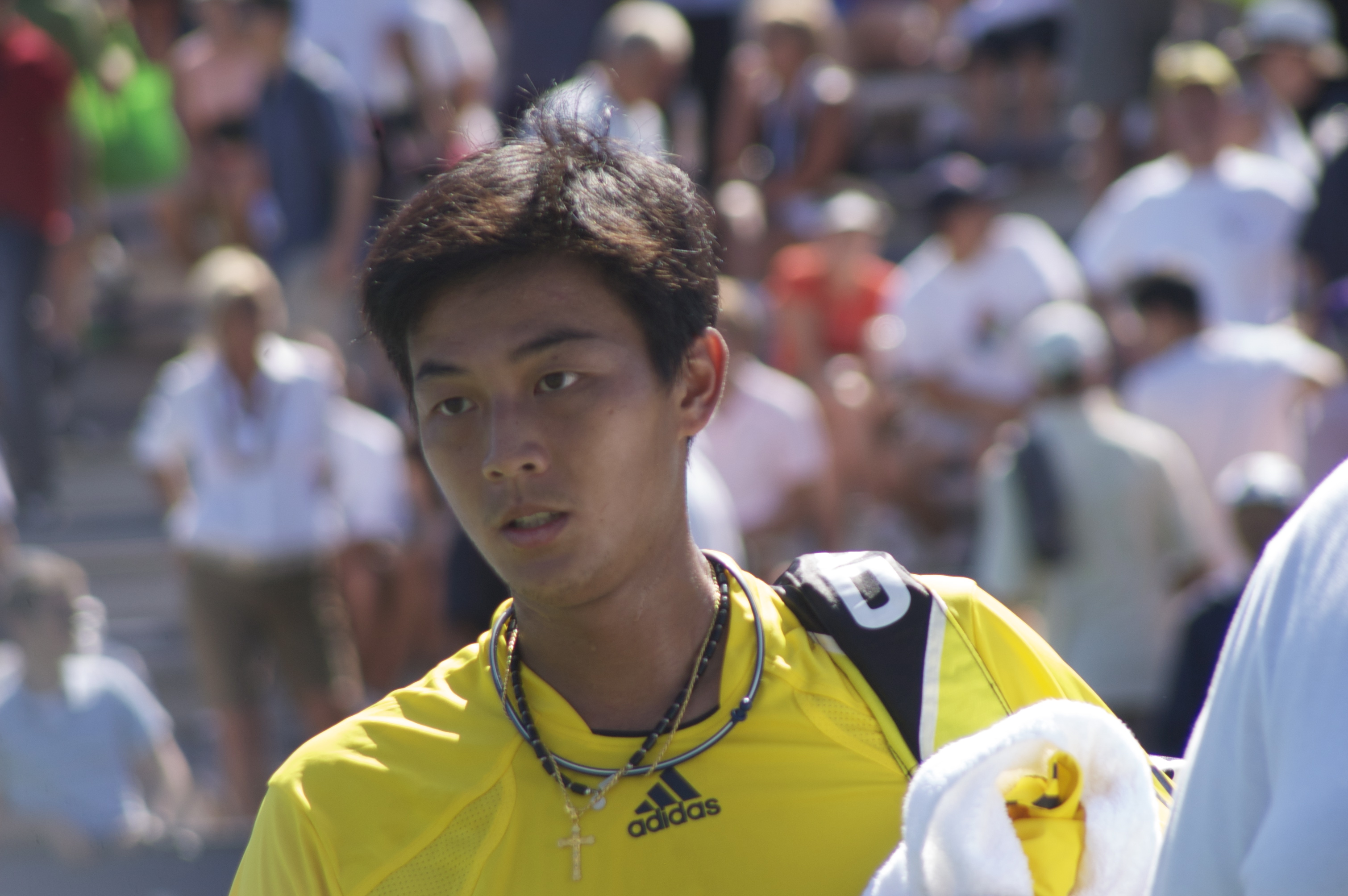
Chinese Taipei player Lu Yen-hsun reached both singles and doubles finals in 2005, defeating Danai Udomchoke in singles, losing with him in doubles.

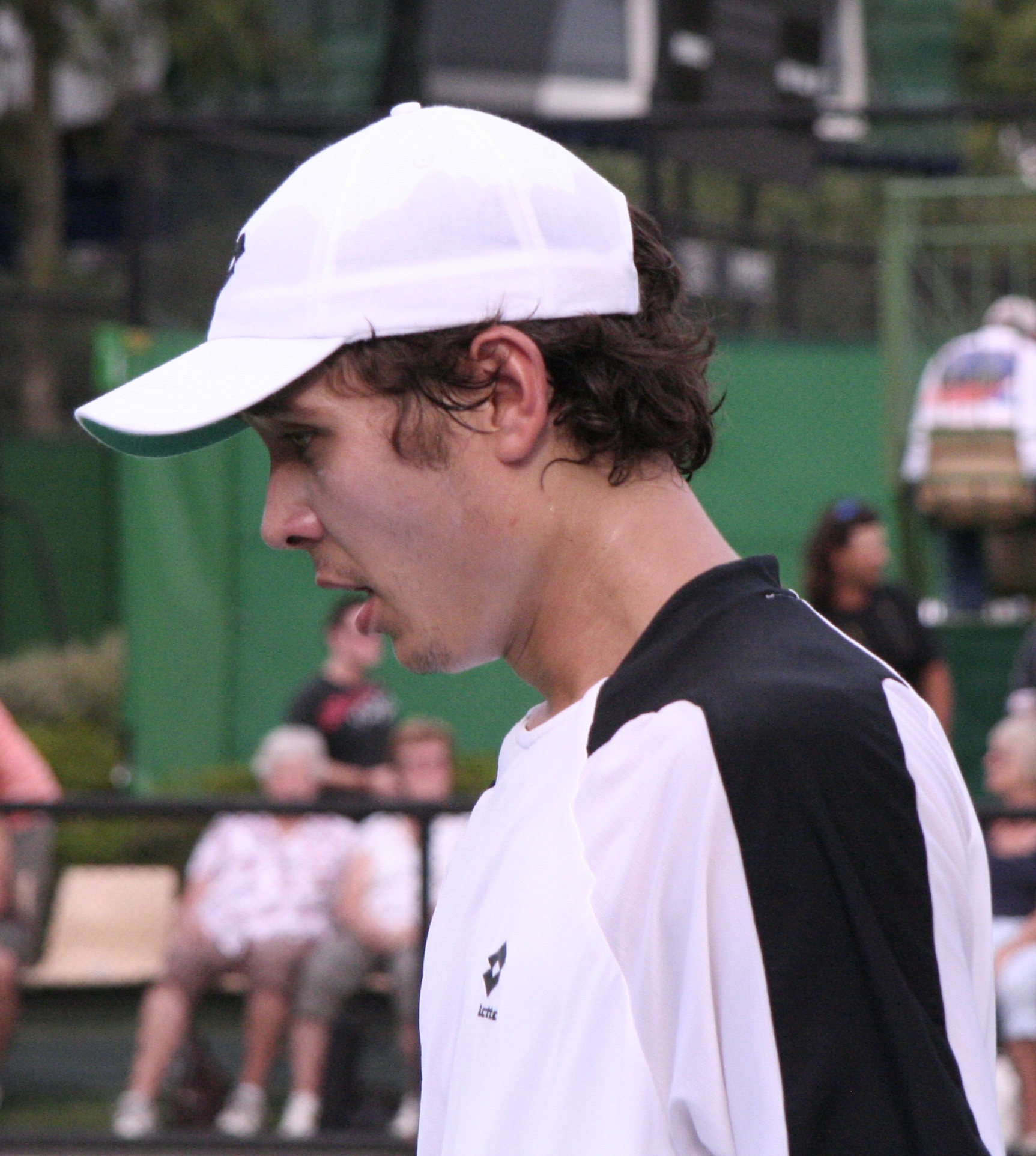
2000 runner-up Igor Kunitsyn from Russia eventually clinched his first career Challenger singles title in Fergana over Prakash Amritraj in 2004.

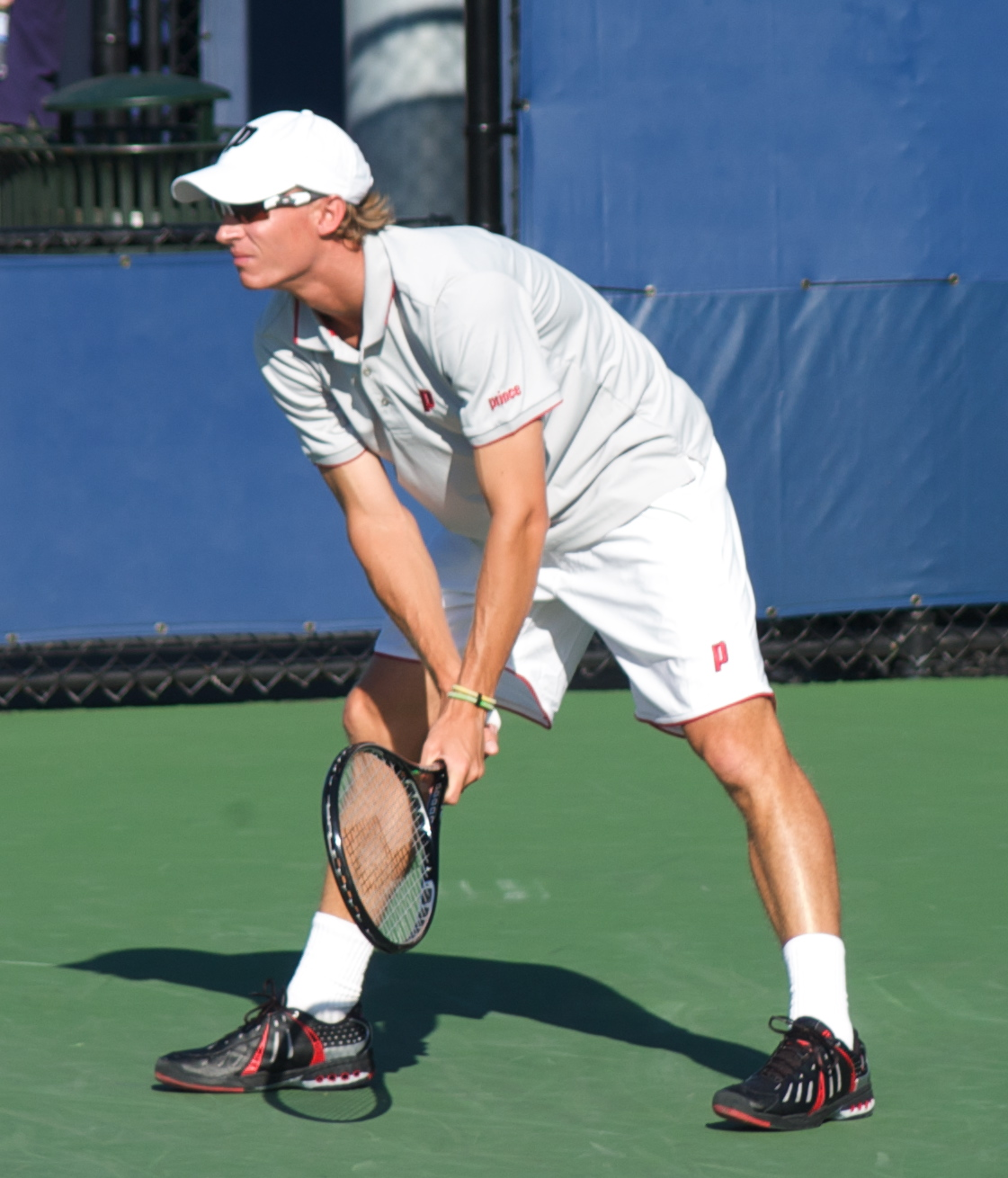
South African Rik de Voest won two back-to-back doubles titles, in 2001 with Kunitsyn and 2002 with Stegmann.

The Fergana Challenger was a professional tennis tournament played on outdoor hardcourts. It was part of the ATP Challenger Tour and the ITF Women's Circuit, and was held annually at the Istiklol Tennis Club in Fergana, Uzbekistan, from 2000 until 2019.

== Past finals ==
=== Men's singles ===
Year	Champion	Runner-up	Score
2019	(Finland) Emil Ruusuvuori	(Dominican Republic) Roberto Cid Subervi	6–3, 6–2
2018	(Serbia) Nikola Milojević	(Spain) Enrique López Pérez	6–3, 6–4
2017	(Belarus) Ilya Ivashka	(Serbia) Nikola Milojević	6–4, 6–3
2016	(Moldova) Radu Albot	(Russia) Konstantin Kravchuk	6–4, 6–2
2015	(Russia) Teymuraz Gabashvili	(Russia) Alexander Kudryavtsev	6–2, 1–0 retired
2014	(Slovenia) Blaž Kavčič	(Russia) Alexander Kudryavtsev	6–4, 7–6^{(10–8)}
2013	(Moldova) Radu Albot	(Serbia) Ilija Bozoljac	7–6^{(11–9)}, 6–7^{(3–7)}, 6–1
2012	(India) Yuki Bhambri	(Israel) Amir Weintraub	6–3, 6–3
2011	(Israel) Dudi Sela	(Australia) Greg Jones	6–2, 6–1
2010	(Russia) Evgeny Kirillov	(China) Zhang Ze	6–3, 2–6, 6–2
2009	(Slovakia) Lukáš Lacko	(Australia) Samuel Groth	4–6, 7–5, 7–6^{(7–4)}
2008	(Czech Republic) Pavel Šnobel	(Switzerland) George Bastl	7–5, 6–3
2007	(France) Antony Dupuis	(Russia) Pavel Chekhov	6–1, 6–4
2006	(Thailand) Danai Udomchoke	(Austria) Alexander Peya	6–0, 6–2
2005	(Chinese Taipei) Lu Yen-hsun	(Thailand) Danai Udomchoke	6–1, 7–6^{(7–3)}
2004	(Russia) Igor Kunitsyn	(India) Prakash Amritraj	6–4, 7–5
2003	(Finland) Tuomas Ketola	(South Africa) Louis Vosloo	6–2, 6–3
2002	(Chinese Taipei) Wang Yeu-tzuoo	(Finland) Tuomas Ketola	6–3, 6–1
2001	(Switzerland) Ivo Heuberger	(Sweden) Fredrik Jonsson	4–6, 7–5, 6–2
2000	(Belarus) Vladimir Voltchkov	(Russia) Igor Kunitsyn	4–6, 6–0, 6–4

=== Women's singles ===
Year	Champion	Runner-up	Score
2019	(Russia) Kamilla Rakhimova	(Russia) Valeriya Yushchenko	6–1, 7–5
2018	(Uzbekistan) Nigina Abduraimova	(Russia) Anastasia Frolova	6–3, 2–0 ret.
2017	(Uzbekistan) Sabina Sharipova	(Russia) Elena Rybakina	6–4, 7–6^{(7–5)}
2016	(Russia) Polina Monova	(Uzbekistan) Sabina Sharipova	6–3, 0–6, 6–4
2015	(Russia) Anastasiya Komardina	(Uzbekistan) Sabina Sharipova	6–2, 1–6, 6–4
2014	(Uzbekistan) Nigina Abduraimova	(Japan) Nao Hibino	6–3, 6–4
2013	(Uzbekistan) Nigina Abduraimova	(Ukraine) Anastasiya Vasylyeva	2–6, 6–1, 7–6^{(7–4)}
2012	(Croatia) Donna Vekić	(Ukraine) Nadiia Kichenok	6–2, 6–2
2011	(Indonesia) Ayu Fani Damayanti	(Chinese Taipei) Hsieh Su-wei	6–3, 6–4

=== Men's doubles ===
Year	Champions	Runners-up	Score
2019	(United States) Evan King (United States) Hunter Reese	(Serbia) Nikola Čačić (Chinese Taipei) Yang Tsung-hua	6–3, 5–7, [10–4]
2018	(Russia) Ivan Gakhov (Russia) Alexander Pavlioutchenkov	(India) Saketh Myneni (India) Vijay Sundar Prashanth	6–4, 6–4
2017	(India) Sriram Balaji (India) Vishnu Vardhan	(Japan) Yuya Kibi (Japan) Shuichi Sekiguchi	6–3, 6–3
2016	(France) Yannick Jankovits (Switzerland) Luca Margaroli	(Japan) Toshihide Matsui (India) Vishnu Vardhan	6–4, 7–6^{(7–4)}
2015	(Belarus) Sergey Betov (Belarus) Mikhail Elgin	(Ukraine) Denys Molchanov (Croatia) Franko Škugor	6–3, 7–5
2014	(Belarus) Sergey Betov (Belarus) Aliaksandr Bury	(Colombia) Nicolás Barrientos (Russia) Stanislav Vovk	6–7^{(6–8)}, 7–6^{(7–1)}, [10–3]
2013	(Uzbekistan) Farrukh Dustov (Tunisia) Malek Jaziri	(Serbia) Ilija Bozoljac (Czech Republic) Roman Jebavý	6–3, 6–3
2012	(South Africa) Raven Klaasen (South Africa) Izak van der Merwe	(Thailand) Sanchai Ratiwatana (Thailand) Sonchat Ratiwatana	6–3, 6–4
2011	(United States) John Paul Fruttero (South Africa) Raven Klaasen	(South Korea) Im Kyu-tae (Thailand) Danai Udomchoke	6–0, 6–3
2010	(United States) Brendan Evans (Japan) Toshihide Matsui	(China) Gong Maoxin (China) Li Zhe	3–6, 6–3, [10–8]
2009	(Russia) Pavel Chekhov (Kazakhstan) Alexey Kedryuk	(Canada) Pierre-Ludovic Duclos (Pakistan) Aisam-ul-Haq Qureshi	4–6, 6–3, [10–5]
2008	(Russia) Konstantin Kravchuk (Poland) Łukasz Kubot	(Russia) Alexandre Krasnoroutskiy (Uzbekistan) Vaja Uzakov	6–4, 6–1
2007	(Germany) Daniel Brands (United States) John Paul Fruttero	(Czech Republic) Lukáš Rosol (Austria) Martin Slanar	7–6^{(7–1)}, 7–5
2006	(Thailand) Sanchai Ratiwatana (Thailand) Sonchat Ratiwatana	(Kazakhstan) Alexey Kedryuk (Ukraine) Orest Tereshchuk	6–7^{(7–9)}, 7–6^{(7–3)}, [14–12]
2005	(Uzbekistan) Murad Inoyatov (Uzbekistan) Denis Istomin	(Chinese Taipei) Lu Yen-hsun (Thailand) Danai Udomchoke	6–1, 6–3
2004	(Netherlands) Raven Klaasen (Netherlands Antilles) Jean-Julien Rojer	(India) Harsh Mankad (Pakistan) Aisam-ul-Haq Qureshi	6–3, 6–1
2003	(South Africa) Justin Bower (Pakistan) Aisam-ul-Haq Qureshi	(Kazakhstan) Alexey Kedryuk (Ukraine) Orest Tereshchuk	3–6, 7–6^{(7–0)}, 6–4
2002	(South Africa) Rik de Voest (South Africa) Dirk Stegmann	(Finland) Tuomas Ketola (Pakistan) Aisam-ul-Haq Qureshi	6–3, 7–5
2001	(South Africa) Rik de Voest (Russia) Igor Kunitsyn	(Canada) Simon Larose (Australia) Michael Tebbutt	6–1, 6–7^{(4–7)}, 6–3
2000	(Israel) Jonathan Erlich (Israel) Lior Mor	(Brazil) Daniel Melo (Brazil) Alexandre Simoni	6–4, 6–0

=== Women's doubles ===
Year	Champions	Runners-up	Score
2019	(Uzbekistan) Nigina Abduraimova (Turkey) Berfu Cengiz	(Australia) Isabella Bozicevic (Russia) Ksenia Laskutova	4–6, 6–1, [10–3]
2018	(Russia) Anastasia Frolova (Russia) Ekaterina Yashina	(Russia) Sofya Lansere (Russia) Kamilla Rakhimova	6–1, 7–6^{(7–4)}
2017	(Uzbekistan) Nigina Abduraimova (Russia) Anastasia Frolova	(Russia) Ksenia Lykina (Uzbekistan) Sabina Sharipova	7–6^{(9–7)}, 7–5
2016	(Russia) Polina Monova (Russia) Yana Sizikova	(India) Prerna Bhambri (India) Ankita Raina	7–6^{(7–0)}, 6–2
2015	(India) Sharmada Balu (Slovenia) Tadeja Majerič	(Uzbekistan) Vlada Ekshibarova (India) Natasha Palha	7–5, 6–3
2014	(Japan) Hiroko Kuwata (Japan) Mari Tanaka	(Japan) Nao Hibino (India) Prarthana Thombare	6–1, 6–4
2013	(Ukraine) Lyudmyla Kichenok (Belarus) Polina Pekhova	(Slovakia) Michaela Hončová (Ukraine) Veronika Kapshay	6–4, 6–2
2012	(Ukraine) Lyudmyla Kichenok (Ukraine) Nadiia Kichenok	(Uzbekistan) Albina Khabibulina (Ukraine) Anastasiya Vasylyeva	6–4, 6–1
2011	(Uzbekistan) Nigina Abduraimova (Uzbekistan) Albina Khabibulina	(United States) Elizaveta Anna Nemchinov (Turkmenistan) Anastasiya Prenko	6–3, 6–3
