= 2017 ITF Men's Circuit (October–December) =

Tennis tournament

The 2017 ITF Men's Circuit is the 2017 edition of the second-tier tour for men's professional tennis. It is organised by the International Tennis Federation and is a tier below the ATP Tour. The ITF Men's Circuit includes tournaments with prize money ranging from $15,000 up to $25,000.

== Key ==
$25,000 tournaments
$15,000 tournaments

== Month ==
=== October ===
Week of	Tournament	Winner	Runners-up	Semifinalists	Quarterfinalists
October 2	Australia F6 Futures; Toowoomba, Australia; Hard $25,000; Singles and doubles draws	(Australia) Andrew Harris; 6–4, 6–0	(Australia) Jason Kubler	(Australia) Maverick Banes (Australia) Dayne Kelly	(Australia) Benjamin Mitchell (Australia) Gavin van Peperzeel (Australia) Calum Puttergill (Netherlands) Sem Verbeek
October 2	Australia F6 Futures; Toowoomba, Australia; Hard $25,000; Singles and doubles draws	(China) Li Zhe (Australia) Bradley Mousley; 6–4, 7–6^{(7–4)}	(United States) Nathan Pasha (Australia) Darren Polkinghorne	(Australia) Maverick Banes (Australia) Dayne Kelly	(Australia) Benjamin Mitchell (Australia) Gavin van Peperzeel (Australia) Calum Puttergill (Netherlands) Sem Verbeek
October 2	France F22 Futures; Nevers, France; Hard (indoor) $25,000+H; Singles and doubles draws	(France) Benjamin Bonzi; 6–2, 3–6, 7–5	(Czech Republic) Marek Jaloviec	(Netherlands) Igor Sijsling (France) David Guez	(France) Mathias Bourgue (France) Gianni Mina (Germany) Christoph Negritu (France) Clément Tabur
October 2	France F22 Futures; Nevers, France; Hard (indoor) $25,000+H; Singles and doubles draws	(France) Benjamin Bonzi (France) Antoine Hoang; 7–6^{(7–5)}, 6–4	(United States) Nathaniel Lammons (United States) Alex Lawson	(Netherlands) Igor Sijsling (France) David Guez	(France) Mathias Bourgue (France) Gianni Mina (Germany) Christoph Negritu (France) Clément Tabur
October 2	Italy F32 Futures; Pula, Italy; Clay $25,000; Singles and doubles draws	(France) Corentin Moutet; 6–1, 6–0	(Italy) Gianluca Di Nicola	(Slovakia) Filip Horanský (Belgium) Christopher Heyman	(Italy) Walter Trusendi (Austria) Andreas Haider-Maurer (Netherlands) Mick Veldheer (Serbia) Miomir Kecmanović
October 2	Italy F32 Futures; Pula, Italy; Clay $25,000; Singles and doubles draws	(Italy) Walter Trusendi (Italy) Andrea Vavassori; 7–6^{(7–3)}, 6–3	(United States) Hunter Johnson (United States) Yates Johnson	(Slovakia) Filip Horanský (Belgium) Christopher Heyman	(Italy) Walter Trusendi (Austria) Andreas Haider-Maurer (Netherlands) Mick Veldheer (Serbia) Miomir Kecmanović
October 2	Sweden F4 Futures; Falun, Sweden; Hard (indoor) $25,000; Singles and doubles draws	(Netherlands) Tallon Griekspoor; 6–4, 6–1	(Estonia) Jürgen Zopp	(Brazil) João Menezes (Sweden) Markus Eriksson	(Switzerland) Antoine Bellier (Sweden) Patrik Brydolf (Finland) Emil Ruusuvuori (Switzerland) Adrien Bossel
October 2	Sweden F4 Futures; Falun, Sweden; Hard (indoor) $25,000; Singles and doubles draws	(Philippines) Ruben Gonzales (United States) Hunter Reese; 6–4, 7–6^{(8–6)}	(Sweden) Markus Eriksson (Sweden) Milos Sekulic	(Brazil) João Menezes (Sweden) Markus Eriksson	(Switzerland) Antoine Bellier (Sweden) Patrik Brydolf (Finland) Emil Ruusuvuori (Switzerland) Adrien Bossel
October 2	Bolivia F3 Futures; Santa Cruz, Bolivia; Clay $15,000; Singles and doubles draws	(Bolivia) Hugo Dellien; 6–4, 6–2	(Chile) Juan Carlos Sáez	(Colombia) Felipe Mantilla (Argentina) Facundo Juárez	(Argentina) Ignacio Monzón (Bolivia) Federico Zeballos (Argentina) Matías Zukas (Peru) Mauricio Echazú
October 2	Bolivia F3 Futures; Santa Cruz, Bolivia; Clay $15,000; Singles and doubles draws	(Guatemala) Christopher Díaz Figueroa (Argentina) Matías Zukas; 3–6, 6–2, [10–1]	(Chile) Juan Carlos Sáez (Argentina) Eduardo Agustín Torre	(Colombia) Felipe Mantilla (Argentina) Facundo Juárez	(Argentina) Ignacio Monzón (Bolivia) Federico Zeballos (Argentina) Matías Zukas (Peru) Mauricio Echazú
October 2	Egypt F28 Futures; Sharm El Sheikh, Egypt; Hard $15,000; Singles and doubles draws	(Norway) Viktor Durasovic; 2–6, 6–3, 7–5	(Czech Republic) Tomáš Papík	(Czech Republic) Jan Mertl (Spain) David Pérez Sanz	(Tunisia) Anis Ghorbel (Tunisia) Moez Echargui (Czech Republic) Petr Hájek (Italy) Giorgio Ricca
October 2	Egypt F28 Futures; Sharm El Sheikh, Egypt; Hard $15,000; Singles and doubles draws	(Tunisia) Anis Ghorbel (Spain) David Pérez Sanz; 6–3, 7–6^{(7–2)}	(Egypt) Youssef Hossam (Egypt) Mazen Osama	(Czech Republic) Jan Mertl (Spain) David Pérez Sanz	(Tunisia) Anis Ghorbel (Tunisia) Moez Echargui (Czech Republic) Petr Hájek (Italy) Giorgio Ricca
October 2	Portugal F21 Futures; Idanha-a-Nova, Portugal; Hard $15,000; Singles and doubles draws	(Portugal) João Monteiro; 3–6, 6–4, 6–3	(Switzerland) Raphael Baltensperger	(Spain) Pablo Vivero González (France) Yanais Laurent	(Italy) Erik Crepaldi (Italy) Giovanni Fonio (Republic of Ireland) Simon Carr (Monaco) Lucas Catarina
October 2	Portugal F21 Futures; Idanha-a-Nova, Portugal; Hard $15,000; Singles and doubles draws	(Italy) Erik Crepaldi (Serbia) Darko Jandrić; 7–6^{(7–3)}, 6–2	(Spain) Jaime Pulgar-García (Spain) Pablo Vivero González	(Spain) Pablo Vivero González (France) Yanais Laurent	(Italy) Erik Crepaldi (Italy) Giovanni Fonio (Republic of Ireland) Simon Carr (Monaco) Lucas Catarina
October 2	Spain F32 Futures; Melilla, Spain; Clay $15,000; Singles and doubles draws	(Canada) Steven Diez; 6–2, 6–0	(Spain) Miguel Semmler	(Austria) Pascal Brunner (Argentina) Dante Gennaro	(Argentina) Patricio Heras (Italy) Fabrizio Ornago (Spain) Marc Fornell Mestres (Spain) Gerard Granollers
October 2	Spain F32 Futures; Melilla, Spain; Clay $15,000; Singles and doubles draws	(Argentina) Dante Gennaro (Argentina) Patricio Heras; 7–6^{(7–5)}, 6–2	(Spain) Sergi Pérez Contri (Spain) Benjamín Winter López	(Austria) Pascal Brunner (Argentina) Dante Gennaro	(Argentina) Patricio Heras (Italy) Fabrizio Ornago (Spain) Marc Fornell Mestres (Spain) Gerard Granollers
October 2	Thailand F7 Futures; Nonthaburi, Thailand; Hard $15,000; Singles and doubles draws	(Thailand) Wishaya Trongcharoenchaikul; 6–2, 6–4	(United States) Nicholas Hu	(Italy) Riccardo Balzerani (Japan) Yuta Shimizu	(Republic of Ireland) Sam Barry (Japan) Kento Takeuchi (Latvia) Mārtiņš Podžus (Japan) Makoto Ochi
October 2	Thailand F7 Futures; Nonthaburi, Thailand; Hard $15,000; Singles and doubles draws	(Japan) Hiroyasu Ehara (Japan) Shunrou Takeshima; 6–4, 5–7, [10–4]	(Japan) Issei Okamura (Thailand) Wishaya Trongcharoenchaikul	(Italy) Riccardo Balzerani (Japan) Yuta Shimizu	(Republic of Ireland) Sam Barry (Japan) Kento Takeuchi (Latvia) Mārtiņš Podžus (Japan) Makoto Ochi
October 2	Tunisia F29 Futures; Hammamet, Tunisia; Clay $15,000; Singles and doubles draws	(Italy) Filippo Baldi; 5–7, 6–4, 6–3	(Tunisia) Aziz Dougaz	(Portugal) Frederico Ferreira Silva (Belgium) Zizou Bergs	(Belgium) Romain Barbosa (Italy) Gian Marco Moroni (Czech Republic) Michael Vrbenský (Morocco) Amine Ahouda
October 2	Tunisia F29 Futures; Hammamet, Tunisia; Clay $15,000; Singles and doubles draws	Doubles competition cancelled due to bad weather		(Portugal) Frederico Ferreira Silva (Belgium) Zizou Bergs	(Belgium) Romain Barbosa (Italy) Gian Marco Moroni (Czech Republic) Michael Vrbenský (Morocco) Amine Ahouda
October 2	Turkey F37 Futures; Antalya, Turkey; Clay $15,000; Singles and doubles draws	(Germany) Peter Torebko; 6–2, 6–2	(Croatia) Mate Delić	(Italy) Alessandro Petrone (Austria) Thomas Statzberger	(Belgium) Jeroen Vanneste (Italy) Davide Galoppini (Croatia) Duje Kekez (Turkey) Sarp Ağabigün
October 2	Turkey F37 Futures; Antalya, Turkey; Clay $15,000; Singles and doubles draws	(Brazil) Felipe Meligeni Alves (Brazil) Caio Silva; 6–4, 6–3	(Hungary) Péter Nagy (Germany) Peter Torebko	(Italy) Alessandro Petrone (Austria) Thomas Statzberger	(Belgium) Jeroen Vanneste (Italy) Davide Galoppini (Croatia) Duje Kekez (Turkey) Sarp Ağabigün
October 9	Australia F7 Futures; Cairns, Australia; Hard $25,000; Singles and doubles draws	(Australia) Dayne Kelly; 6–3, 7–6^{(7–5)}	(Australia) Jason Kubler	(Australia) Alex Bolt (Australia) Maverick Banes	(Australia) Omar Jasika (China) Gao Xin (Australia) Gavin van Peperzeel (United States) Nathan Pasha
October 9	Australia F7 Futures; Cairns, Australia; Hard $25,000; Singles and doubles draws	(United States) Nathan Pasha (Australia) Darren Polkinghorne; 6–2, 2–6, [10–2]	(Philippines) Francis Alcantara (Netherlands) Sem Verbeek	(Australia) Alex Bolt (Australia) Maverick Banes	(Australia) Omar Jasika (China) Gao Xin (Australia) Gavin van Peperzeel (United States) Nathan Pasha
October 9	France F23 Futures; Saint-Dizier, France; Hard (indoor) $25,000; Singles and doubles draws	(Belgium) Maxime Authom; 7–6^{(7–4)}, 4–6, 6–3	(France) David Guez	(France) Corentin Denolly (France) Constant Lestienne	(France) Grégoire Jacq (Austria) Maximilian Neuchrist (Réunion) Quentin Robert (France) Antoine Hoang
October 9	France F23 Futures; Saint-Dizier, France; Hard (indoor) $25,000; Singles and doubles draws	(France) Jonathan Kanar (France) Mick Lescure; 0–6, 6–4, [11–9]	(United States) Nathaniel Lammons (United States) Alex Lawson	(France) Corentin Denolly (France) Constant Lestienne	(France) Grégoire Jacq (Austria) Maximilian Neuchrist (Réunion) Quentin Robert (France) Antoine Hoang
October 9	Italy F33 Futures; Pula, Italy; Clay $25,000; Singles and doubles draws	(Italy) Andrea Pellegrino; 7–5, 2–6, 6–3	(France) Corentin Moutet	(Italy) Andrea Basso (Italy) Andrea Vavassori	(Germany) Julian Lenz (Italy) Gianluca Di Nicola (Austria) Dennis Novak (Serbia) Miljan Zekić
October 9	Italy F33 Futures; Pula, Italy; Clay $25,000; Singles and doubles draws	(Italy) Omar Giacalone (Italy) Jacopo Stefanini; 7–5, 6–2	(Italy) Walter Trusendi (Italy) Andrea Vavassori	(Italy) Andrea Basso (Italy) Andrea Vavassori	(Germany) Julian Lenz (Italy) Gianluca Di Nicola (Austria) Dennis Novak (Serbia) Miljan Zekić
October 9	Nigeria F4 Futures; Lagos, Nigeria; Hard $25,000+H; Singles and doubles draws	(Serbia) Peđa Krstin; 6–2, 6–3	(Netherlands) Stephan Fransen	(India) Aryan Goveas (Turkey) Cem İlkel	(France) Johan Tatlot (Serbia) Ilija Vučić (France) Lény Mitjana (Croatia) Matej Sabanov
October 9	Nigeria F4 Futures; Lagos, Nigeria; Hard $25,000+H; Singles and doubles draws	(Croatia) Ivan Sabanov (Croatia) Matej Sabanov; 4–6, 7–5, [10–5]	(France) Tom Jomby (France) Johan Tatlot	(India) Aryan Goveas (Turkey) Cem İlkel	(France) Johan Tatlot (Serbia) Ilija Vučić (France) Lény Mitjana (Croatia) Matej Sabanov
October 9	USA F33 Futures; Houston, United States; Hard $25,000; Singles and doubles draws	(United States) Thai-Son Kwiatkowski; 6–2, 6–2	(United States) Sebastian Korda	(United States) Austin Krajicek (Austria) Lucas Miedler	(Israel) Or Ram-Harel (United States) Christopher Eubanks (United States) Samuel Shropshire (Australia) Alexei Popyrin
October 9	USA F33 Futures; Houston, United States; Hard $25,000; Singles and doubles draws	(United States) Aron Hiltzik (United States) Dennis Nevolo; 7–6^{(7–3)}, 6–3	(United States) Austin Krajicek (United States) Thai-Son Kwiatkowski	(United States) Austin Krajicek (Austria) Lucas Miedler	(Israel) Or Ram-Harel (United States) Christopher Eubanks (United States) Samuel Shropshire (Australia) Alexei Popyrin
October 9	Egypt F29 Futures; Sharm El Sheikh, Egypt; Hard $15,000; Singles and doubles draws	(Netherlands) Thiemo de Bakker; 6–3, 7–6^{(7–3)}	(Netherlands) Gijs Brouwer	(Spain) David Pérez Sanz (France) Antoine Escoffier	(Ukraine) Olexiy Kolisnyk (Italy) Francesco Vilardo (Czech Republic) Filip Duda (Norway) Viktor Durasovic
October 9	Egypt F29 Futures; Sharm El Sheikh, Egypt; Hard $15,000; Singles and doubles draws	(Republic of Ireland) Peter Bothwell (Spain) David Pérez Sanz; 6–0, 6–3	(Belarus) Aliaksandr Liaonenka (Ukraine) Nikita Mashtakov	(Spain) David Pérez Sanz (France) Antoine Escoffier	(Ukraine) Olexiy Kolisnyk (Italy) Francesco Vilardo (Czech Republic) Filip Duda (Norway) Viktor Durasovic
October 9	Germany F14 Futures; Oberhaching, Germany; Hard (indoor) $15,000; Singles and doubles draws	(Germany) Robin Kern; 6–3, 7–6^{(7–4)}	(Netherlands) Scott Griekspoor	(Germany) Daniel Masur (Poland) Andriej Kapaś	(United Kingdom) Evan Hoyt (Switzerland) Marc-Andrea Hüsler (Germany) Sami Reinwein (Germany) Elmar Ejupovic
October 9	Germany F14 Futures; Oberhaching, Germany; Hard (indoor) $15,000; Singles and doubles draws	(Germany) Johannes Härteis (Germany) Daniel Masur; 4–6, 7–5, [10–5]	(Switzerland) Marc-Andrea Hüsler (United Kingdom) Neil Pauffley	(Germany) Daniel Masur (Poland) Andriej Kapaś	(United Kingdom) Evan Hoyt (Switzerland) Marc-Andrea Hüsler (Germany) Sami Reinwein (Germany) Elmar Ejupovic
October 9	Spain F33 Futures; Riba-roja de Túria, Spain; Clay $15,000; Singles and doubles draws	(Spain) Daniel Gimeno Traver; 6–3, 6–2	(Spain) Guillermo Olaso	(Brazil) Jordan Correia (Spain) Sergio Gutiérrez Ferrol	(Spain) Quim Sorni Chavarria (Italy) Erik Crepaldi (Spain) Jaume Pla Malfeito (Spain) Gerard Granollers
October 9	Spain F33 Futures; Riba-roja de Túria, Spain; Clay $15,000; Singles and doubles draws	(Spain) Javier Barranco Cosano (Italy) Raúl Brancaccio; 5–7, 6–3, [10–7]	(Spain) Gerard Granollers (Spain) Guillermo Olaso	(Brazil) Jordan Correia (Spain) Sergio Gutiérrez Ferrol	(Spain) Quim Sorni Chavarria (Italy) Erik Crepaldi (Spain) Jaume Pla Malfeito (Spain) Gerard Granollers
October 9	Thailand F8 Futures; Nonthaburi, Thailand; Hard $15,000; Singles and doubles draws	(Australia) Max Purcell; 6–7^{(7–9)}, 6–2, 7–6^{(7–4)}	(Latvia) Mārtiņš Podžus	(Chinese Taipei) Lo Chien-hsun (Republic of Ireland) Sam Barry	(Japan) Shinji Hazawa (Chinese Taipei) Yang Tsung-hua (South Korea) Chung Yun-seong (Vietnam) Lý Hoàng Nam
October 9	Thailand F8 Futures; Nonthaburi, Thailand; Hard $15,000; Singles and doubles draws	(Thailand) Pruchya Isaro (Japan) Masato Shiga; 6–3, 6–1	(Japan) Yuichi Ito (Vietnam) Lý Hoàng Nam	(Chinese Taipei) Lo Chien-hsun (Republic of Ireland) Sam Barry	(Japan) Shinji Hazawa (Chinese Taipei) Yang Tsung-hua (South Korea) Chung Yun-seong (Vietnam) Lý Hoàng Nam
October 9	Tunisia F30 Futures; Hammamet, Tunisia; Clay $15,000; Singles and doubles draws	(Argentina) Patricio Heras; 6–2, 6–1	(Argentina) Dante Gennaro	(Spain) Miguel Semmler (Italy) Gian Marco Moroni	(France) Matthieu Perchicot (France) Gabriel Petit (Italy) Cristian Carli (Croatia) Nino Serdarušić
October 9	Tunisia F30 Futures; Hammamet, Tunisia; Clay $15,000; Singles and doubles draws	(Italy) Cristian Carli (Croatia) Nino Serdarušić; 6–7^{(6–8)}, 6–4, [10–7]	(Brazil) Rafael Matos (Brazil) Marcelo Zormann	(Spain) Miguel Semmler (Italy) Gian Marco Moroni	(France) Matthieu Perchicot (France) Gabriel Petit (Italy) Cristian Carli (Croatia) Nino Serdarušić
October 9	Turkey F38 Futures; Antalya, Turkey; Clay $15,000; Singles and doubles draws	(Kazakhstan) Dmitry Popko; 7–5, 3–6, 6–3	(Bulgaria) Dimitar Kuzmanov	(Serbia) Nikola Ćaćić (Slovakia) Tomáš Líška	(Italy) Riccardo Bonadio (Italy) Davide Galoppini (Russia) Ronald Slobodchikov (Germany) Peter Torebko
October 9	Turkey F38 Futures; Antalya, Turkey; Clay $15,000; Singles and doubles draws	(Serbia) Nikola Ćaćić (Kazakhstan) Dmitry Popko; 6–1, 6–4	(Germany) Peter Torebko (Belgium) Jeroen Vanneste	(Serbia) Nikola Ćaćić (Slovakia) Tomáš Líška	(Italy) Riccardo Bonadio (Italy) Davide Galoppini (Russia) Ronald Slobodchikov (Germany) Peter Torebko
October 16	France F24 Futures; Rodez, France; Hard (indoor) $25,000+H; Singles and doubles draws	(Poland) Kamil Majchrzak; 7–6^{(7–3)}, 2–6, 6–1	(France) Antoine Hoang	(United Kingdom) Edward Corrie (Spain) Andrés Artuñedo	(France) David Guez (France) Gianni Mina (France) Jules Okala (France) Constant Lestienne
October 16	France F24 Futures; Rodez, France; Hard (indoor) $25,000+H; Singles and doubles draws	(United States) Nathaniel Lammons (United States) Alex Lawson; 7–6^{(7–4)}, 4–6, [10–7]	(France) Antoine Hoang (France) Ugo Humbert	(United Kingdom) Edward Corrie (Spain) Andrés Artuñedo	(France) David Guez (France) Gianni Mina (France) Jules Okala (France) Constant Lestienne
October 16	Italy F34 Futures; Pula, Italy; Clay $25,000; Singles and doubles draws	(Spain) Daniel Gimeno Traver; 6–3, 6–4	(Italy) Andrea Basso	(Italy) Lorenzo Giustino (Germany) Julian Lenz	(Italy) Omar Giacalone (Serbia) Miljan Zekić (France) Maxime Chazal (Romania) Bogdan Ionuț Apostol
October 16	Italy F34 Futures; Pula, Italy; Clay $25,000; Singles and doubles draws	(Spain) Marc Fornell Mestres (Portugal) Fred Gil; 6–2, 5–7, [10–5]	(Italy) Filippo Baldi (Italy) Andrea Pellegrino	(Italy) Lorenzo Giustino (Germany) Julian Lenz	(Italy) Omar Giacalone (Serbia) Miljan Zekić (France) Maxime Chazal (Romania) Bogdan Ionuț Apostol
October 16	Nigeria F5 Futures; Lagos, Nigeria; Hard $25,000+H; Singles and doubles draws	(Serbia) Peđa Krstin; 6–2, 4–6, 6–3	(France) Johan Tatlot	(India) Prajnesh Gunneswaran (Egypt) Karim-Mohamed Maamoun	(France) Tom Jomby (Turkey) Cem İlkel (France) Lény Mitjana (Spain) Hugo Largo
October 16	Nigeria F5 Futures; Lagos, Nigeria; Hard $25,000+H; Singles and doubles draws	(Croatia) Ivan Sabanov (Croatia) Matej Sabanov; 6–3, 6–4	(India) Chandril Sood (India) Lakshit Sood	(India) Prajnesh Gunneswaran (Egypt) Karim-Mohamed Maamoun	(France) Tom Jomby (Turkey) Cem İlkel (France) Lény Mitjana (Spain) Hugo Largo
October 16	USA F34 Futures; Harlingen, United States; Hard $25,000; Singles and doubles draws	(United States) J. J. Wolf; 6–7^{(1–7)}, 6–1, 6–2	(United States) Evan Zhu	(United Kingdom) Luke Bambridge (United States) Strong Kirchheimer	(Australia) Alexei Popyrin (United States) Ryan Shane (United States) Ulises Blanch (United States) Ryan Haviland
October 16	USA F34 Futures; Harlingen, United States; Hard $25,000; Singles and doubles draws	(United States) Hunter Johnson (United States) Yates Johnson; 7–6^{(7–2)}, 6–3	(United States) Harrison Adams (United States) Shane Vinsant	(United Kingdom) Luke Bambridge (United States) Strong Kirchheimer	(Australia) Alexei Popyrin (United States) Ryan Shane (United States) Ulises Blanch (United States) Ryan Haviland
October 16	Egypt F30 Futures; Sharm El Sheikh, Egypt; Hard $15,000; Singles and doubles draws	(Netherlands) Gijs Brouwer; 6–3, 6–4	(Netherlands) Jelle Sels	(Netherlands) Michiel de Krom (Spain) David Pérez Sanz	(Poland) Adrian Andrzejczuk (Spain) Pablo Vivero González (Tunisia) Anis Ghorbel (Netherlands) Ryan Nijboer
October 16	Egypt F30 Futures; Sharm El Sheikh, Egypt; Hard $15,000; Singles and doubles draws	(Tunisia) Anis Ghorbel (Egypt) Youssef Hossam; 6–4, 4–2, ret.	(Poland) Adrian Andrzejczuk (Spain) José Francisco Vidal Azorín	(Netherlands) Michiel de Krom (Spain) David Pérez Sanz	(Poland) Adrian Andrzejczuk (Spain) Pablo Vivero González (Tunisia) Anis Ghorbel (Netherlands) Ryan Nijboer
October 16	Germany F15 Futures; Bad Salzdetfurth, Germany; Carpet (indoor) $15,000; Singles and doubles draws	(Germany) Marvin Möller; 6–3, 5–7, 7–5	(Russia) Evgeny Karlovskiy	(Germany) Elmar Ejupovic (Monaco) Lucas Catarina	(France) Jonathan Kanar (Poland) Karol Drzewiecki (Germany) Lukas Rüpke (Slovakia) Patrik Néma
October 16	Germany F15 Futures; Bad Salzdetfurth, Germany; Carpet (indoor) $15,000; Singles and doubles draws	(Russia) Alexander Igoshin (Russia) Evgeny Karlovskiy; 6–3, 6–7^{(0–7)}, [12–10]	(Germany) Tom Schönenberg (Germany) Jakob Sude	(Germany) Elmar Ejupovic (Monaco) Lucas Catarina	(France) Jonathan Kanar (Poland) Karol Drzewiecki (Germany) Lukas Rüpke (Slovakia) Patrik Néma
October 16	Israel F13 Futures; Ashkelon, Israel; Hard $15,000; Singles and doubles draws	(Belgium) Christopher Heyman; 7–6^{(8–6)}, 4–6, 6–4	(Israel) Igor Smilansky	(Israel) Mor Bulis (Argentina) Matías Franco Descotte	(Israel) Ram Kapach (Israel) Ben Patael (United Kingdom) Richard Gabb (Canada) Alexander Day
October 16	Israel F13 Futures; Ashkelon, Israel; Hard $15,000; Singles and doubles draws	(United Kingdom) Richard Gabb (United Kingdom) Luke Johnson; 6–2, 6–1	(Israel) Alon Elia (Croatia) Fran Zvonimir Zgombić	(Israel) Mor Bulis (Argentina) Matías Franco Descotte	(Israel) Ram Kapach (Israel) Ben Patael (United Kingdom) Richard Gabb (Canada) Alexander Day
October 16	Malaysia F1 Futures; Kuching, Malaysia; Hard $15,000; Singles and doubles draws	(Uzbekistan) Jurabek Karimov; 7–6^{(7–5)}, 6–2	(United States) Evan Song	(Italy) Alessandro Bega (Japan) Ryota Tanuma	(Latvia) Mārtiņš Podžus (Germany) Lukas Ollert (Kazakhstan) Denis Yevseyev (Japan) Takashi Saito
October 16	Malaysia F1 Futures; Kuching, Malaysia; Hard $15,000; Singles and doubles draws	(Philippines) Ruben Gonzales (United States) Hunter Reese; 5–7, 6–4, [10–5]	(India) Arjun Kadhe (Germany) Lukas Ollert	(Italy) Alessandro Bega (Japan) Ryota Tanuma	(Latvia) Mārtiņš Podžus (Germany) Lukas Ollert (Kazakhstan) Denis Yevseyev (Japan) Takashi Saito
October 16	Thailand F9 Futures; Pattaya, Thailand; Hard (indoor) $15,000; Singles and doubles draws	(Australia) Max Purcell; 6–2, 6–2	(Chinese Taipei) Wu Tung-lin	(Chinese Taipei) Yu Cheng-yu (India) Karunuday Singh	(United States) Nicholas Hu (Italy) Riccardo Balzerani (Japan) Jumpei Yamasaki (Italy) Enrico Dalla Valle
October 16	Thailand F9 Futures; Pattaya, Thailand; Hard (indoor) $15,000; Singles and doubles draws	(Chinese Taipei) Chen Ti (Australia) Max Purcell; 6–1, 6–1	(Hong Kong) Skyler Butts (China) Li Yuanfeng	(Chinese Taipei) Yu Cheng-yu (India) Karunuday Singh	(United States) Nicholas Hu (Italy) Riccardo Balzerani (Japan) Jumpei Yamasaki (Italy) Enrico Dalla Valle
October 16	Tunisia F31 Futures; Hammamet, Tunisia; Clay $15,000; Singles and doubles draws	(Croatia) Nino Serdarušić; 6–3, 3–6, 6–4	(Canada) Steven Diez	(Spain) Gerard Granollers (France) Alexandre Müller	(France) Elliot Benchetrit (France) Samuel Bensoussan (Spain) Oriol Roca Batalla (France) Alexis Musialek
October 16	Tunisia F31 Futures; Hammamet, Tunisia; Clay $15,000; Singles and doubles draws	(Canada) Steven Diez (Spain) Bruno Mardones; 6–2, 6–4	(Netherlands) Guy den Heijer (Netherlands) Sidané Pontjodikromo	(Spain) Gerard Granollers (France) Alexandre Müller	(France) Elliot Benchetrit (France) Samuel Bensoussan (Spain) Oriol Roca Batalla (France) Alexis Musialek
October 16	Turkey F39 Futures; Antalya, Turkey; Clay $15,000; Singles and doubles draws	(Spain) Jordi Samper Montaña; 0–6, 6–4, 6–4	(Brazil) Thiago Seyboth Wild	(Italy) Filippo Leonardi (Belgium) Julien Cagnina	(Kazakhstan) Dmitry Popko (Brazil) Felipe Meligeni Alves (Canada) Pavel Krainik (Germany) Peter Torebko
October 16	Turkey F39 Futures; Antalya, Turkey; Clay $15,000; Singles and doubles draws	(Croatia) Domagoj Bilješko (Chile) Alejandro Tabilo; 7–6^{(7–5)}, 4–6, [10–3]	(Italy) Riccardo Bonadio (Italy) Federico Maccari	(Italy) Filippo Leonardi (Belgium) Julien Cagnina	(Kazakhstan) Dmitry Popko (Brazil) Felipe Meligeni Alves (Canada) Pavel Krainik (Germany) Peter Torebko
October 23	Italy F35 Futures; Pula, Italy; Clay $25,000; Singles and doubles draws	(Italy) Federico Gaio; 7–6^{(7–4)}, 2–6, 6–0	(Italy) Lorenzo Sonego	(Italy) Filippo Baldi (Italy) Andrea Vavassori	(Spain) Enrique López Pérez (Spain) Marc Fornell Mestres (Italy) Lorenzo Giustino (Mexico) Lucas Gómez
October 23	Italy F35 Futures; Pula, Italy; Clay $25,000; Singles and doubles draws	(Spain) Marc Fornell Mestres (Portugal) Fred Gil; 3–6, 6–1, [10–8]	(Italy) Raúl Brancaccio (Sweden) Dragoș Nicolae Mădăraș	(Italy) Filippo Baldi (Italy) Andrea Vavassori	(Spain) Enrique López Pérez (Spain) Marc Fornell Mestres (Italy) Lorenzo Giustino (Mexico) Lucas Gómez
October 23	Czech Republic F7 Futures; Jablonec nad Nisou, Czech Republic; Carpet (indoor) $15,000; Singles and doubles draws	(Czech Republic) Patrik Rikl; 6–4, 6–2	(Slovakia) Lukáš Klein	(Czech Republic) Filip Duda (Ukraine) Danylo Kalenichenko	(Czech Republic) Marek Jaloviec (Czech Republic) Petr Hájek (Czech Republic) Matěj Vocel (Czech Republic) Petr Nouza
October 23	Czech Republic F7 Futures; Jablonec nad Nisou, Czech Republic; Carpet (indoor) $15,000; Singles and doubles draws	(Netherlands) Niels Lootsma (Czech Republic) David Poljak; 2–6, 6–4, [10–6]	(Poland) Mateusz Kowalczyk (Poland) Szymon Walków	(Czech Republic) Filip Duda (Ukraine) Danylo Kalenichenko	(Czech Republic) Marek Jaloviec (Czech Republic) Petr Hájek (Czech Republic) Matěj Vocel (Czech Republic) Petr Nouza
October 23	Egypt F31 Futures; Sharm El Sheikh, Egypt; Hard $15,000; Singles and doubles draws	(Spain) Pablo Vivero González; 6–4, 3–6, 6–2	(Egypt) Youssef Hossam	(Norway) Viktor Durasovic (Brazil) João Menezes	(Italy) Francesco Ferrari (Spain) David Jordà Sanchis (Spain) David Pérez Sanz (Netherlands) Gijs Brouwer
October 23	Egypt F31 Futures; Sharm El Sheikh, Egypt; Hard $15,000; Singles and doubles draws	(Spain) David Jordà Sanchis (Brazil) João Menezes; 6–3, 4–6, [10–8]	(Egypt) Youssef Hossam (Italy) Antonio Massara	(Norway) Viktor Durasovic (Brazil) João Menezes	(Italy) Francesco Ferrari (Spain) David Jordà Sanchis (Spain) David Pérez Sanz (Netherlands) Gijs Brouwer
October 23	Estonia F2 Futures; Tartu, Estonia; Carpet (indoor) $15,000; Singles and doubles draws	(Finland) Harri Heliövaara; 6–3, 7–5	(Czech Republic) Zdeněk Kolář	(Sweden) Daniel Appelgren (Russia) Evgeny Karlovskiy	(Sweden) Patrik Brydolf (France) Grégoire Jacq (Russia) Pavel Kotov (Estonia) Kenneth Raisma
October 23	Estonia F2 Futures; Tartu, Estonia; Carpet (indoor) $15,000; Singles and doubles draws	(Finland) Harri Heliövaara (Finland) Patrik Niklas-Salminen; 6–1, 7–6^{(7–3)}	(Russia) Vladimir Polyakov (Russia) Evgenii Tiurnev	(Sweden) Daniel Appelgren (Russia) Evgeny Karlovskiy	(Sweden) Patrik Brydolf (France) Grégoire Jacq (Russia) Pavel Kotov (Estonia) Kenneth Raisma
October 23	Germany F16 Futures; Hamburg, Germany; Hard (indoor) $15,000; Singles and doubles draws	(Germany) Daniel Masur; 6–3, 3–6, 6–3	(Germany) Daniel Altmaier	(France) Axel Michon (Turkey) Altuğ Çelikbilek	(Germany) Marvin Möller (Germany) Elmar Ejupovic (Germany) Rudolf Molleker (Germany) Sami Reinwein
October 23	Germany F16 Futures; Hamburg, Germany; Hard (indoor) $15,000; Singles and doubles draws	(France) Dan Added (Germany) Marvin Möller; 6–7^{(3–7)}, 7–6^{(7–4)}, [10–2]	(Turkey) Altuğ Çelikbilek (Turkey) Anıl Yüksel	(France) Axel Michon (Turkey) Altuğ Çelikbilek	(Germany) Marvin Möller (Germany) Elmar Ejupovic (Germany) Rudolf Molleker (Germany) Sami Reinwein
October 23	Greece F6 Futures; Heraklion, Greece; Hard $15,000; Singles and doubles draws	(Netherlands) Tallon Griekspoor; 7–6^{(7–4)}, 6–4	(Italy) Matteo Viola	(Czech Republic) Václav Šafránek (Hungary) Zsombor Piros	(Czech Republic) Vít Kopřiva (Russia) Markos Kalovelonis (Monaco) Lucas Catarina (Netherlands) Kevin Griekspoor
October 23	Greece F6 Futures; Heraklion, Greece; Hard $15,000; Singles and doubles draws	(Czech Republic) Dominik Kellovský (Czech Republic) Václav Šafránek; 6–7^{(4–7)}, 6–3, [10–7]	(Hungary) Viktor Filipenkó (Serbia) Darko Jandrić	(Czech Republic) Václav Šafránek (Hungary) Zsombor Piros	(Czech Republic) Vít Kopřiva (Russia) Markos Kalovelonis (Monaco) Lucas Catarina (Netherlands) Kevin Griekspoor
October 23	Israel F14 Futures; Kiryat Gat, Israel; Hard $15,000; Singles and doubles draws	(Belgium) Christopher Heyman; 6–3, 6–7^{(5–7)}, 6–2	(Argentina) Matías Franco Descotte	(Israel) Yshai Oliel (Belgium) Maxime Pauwels	(Croatia) Fran Zvonimir Zgombić (United States) Winston Lin (Canada) Alexander Day (United Kingdom) Luke Johnson
October 23	Israel F14 Futures; Kiryat Gat, Israel; Hard $15,000; Singles and doubles draws	(United Kingdom) Richard Gabb (United Kingdom) Luke Johnson; 6–4, 7–6^{(7–2)}	(Argentina) Matías Franco Descotte (France) Hugo Voljacques	(Israel) Yshai Oliel (Belgium) Maxime Pauwels	(Croatia) Fran Zvonimir Zgombić (United States) Winston Lin (Canada) Alexander Day (United Kingdom) Luke Johnson
October 23	Malaysia F2 Futures; Kuala Lumpur, Malaysia; Hard $15,000; Singles and doubles draws	(Netherlands) Scott Griekspoor; 6–3, 6–2	(Uzbekistan) Jurabek Karimov	(Latvia) Mārtiņš Podžus (Japan) Ken Onishi	(Germany) Lukas Ollert (United States) Tyler Lu (Italy) Francesco Vilardo (India) Arjun Kadhe
October 23	Malaysia F2 Futures; Kuala Lumpur, Malaysia; Hard $15,000; Singles and doubles draws	(Uzbekistan) Jurabek Karimov (China) Wang Aoran; 6–4, 6–1	(Guatemala) Wilfredo González (Italy) Francesco Vilardo	(Latvia) Mārtiņš Podžus (Japan) Ken Onishi	(Germany) Lukas Ollert (United States) Tyler Lu (Italy) Francesco Vilardo (India) Arjun Kadhe
October 23	Tunisia F32 Futures; Hammamet, Tunisia; Clay $15,000; Singles and doubles draws	(France) Alexandre Müller; 4–6, 6–3, 6–3	(Spain) Guillermo Olaso	(France) Elliot Benchetrit (Spain) Oriol Roca Batalla	(Portugal) João Monteiro (Spain) Pol Toledo Bagué (France) Alexis Musialek (Russia) Ronald Slobodchikov
October 23	Tunisia F32 Futures; Hammamet, Tunisia; Clay $15,000; Singles and doubles draws	(Portugal) Francisco Cabral (Portugal) Nuno Deus; 6–3, 6–1	(Netherlands) Guy den Heijer (Netherlands) Sidané Pontjodikromo	(France) Elliot Benchetrit (Spain) Oriol Roca Batalla	(Portugal) João Monteiro (Spain) Pol Toledo Bagué (France) Alexis Musialek (Russia) Ronald Slobodchikov
October 23	Turkey F40 Futures; Antalya, Turkey; Clay $15,000; Singles and doubles draws	(Spain) Javier Martí; 6–4, 3–6, 6–1	(Russia) Ivan Nedelko	(Austria) Pascal Brunner (Belgium) Kimmer Coppejans	(Bulgaria) Alexandar Lazov (Turkey) Marsel İlhan (Germany) Kevin Kaczynski (Spain) Jordi Samper Montaña
October 23	Turkey F40 Futures; Antalya, Turkey; Clay $15,000; Singles and doubles draws	(Croatia) Domagoj Bilješko (Chile) Alejandro Tabilo; 6–3, 6–4	(Russia) Alexander Boborykin (Russia) Timur Kiyamov	(Austria) Pascal Brunner (Belgium) Kimmer Coppejans	(Bulgaria) Alexandar Lazov (Turkey) Marsel İlhan (Germany) Kevin Kaczynski (Spain) Jordi Samper Montaña
October 30	Israel F15 Futures; Meitar, Israel; Hard $25,000; Singles and doubles draws	(France) Yannick Jankovits; 7–5, 7–6^{(8–6)}	(Belgium) Yannick Mertens	(Israel) Yshai Oliel (Belgium) Christopher Heyman	(Israel) Mor Bulis (France) Hugo Voljacques (Monaco) Lucas Catarina (France) Jules Okala
October 30	Israel F15 Futures; Meitar, Israel; Hard $25,000; Singles and doubles draws	(France) Yannick Jankovits (Switzerland) Luca Margaroli; 7–6^{(7–4)}, 6–7^{(4–7)}, [10–6]	(United Kingdom) Richard Gabb (United Kingdom) Luke Johnson	(Israel) Yshai Oliel (Belgium) Christopher Heyman	(Israel) Mor Bulis (France) Hugo Voljacques (Monaco) Lucas Catarina (France) Jules Okala
October 30	Italy F36 Futures; Pula, Italy; Clay $25,000; Singles and doubles draws	(Bosnia and Herzegovina) Tomislav Brkić; 7–5, 6–4	(Italy) Lorenzo Sonego	(Serbia) Miljan Zekić (Italy) Federico Gaio	(Italy) Omar Giacalone (Italy) Gianluca Di Nicola (Italy) Andrea Vavassori (Portugal) Fred Gil
October 30	Italy F36 Futures; Pula, Italy; Clay $25,000; Singles and doubles draws	(Italy) Alessandro Motti (Italy) Andrea Vavassori; 3–6, 6–4, [10–8]	(Spain) Marc Fornell Mestres (Portugal) Fred Gil	(Serbia) Miljan Zekić (Italy) Federico Gaio	(Italy) Omar Giacalone (Italy) Gianluca Di Nicola (Italy) Andrea Vavassori (Portugal) Fred Gil
October 30	Czech Republic F8 Futures; Opava, Czech Republic; Hard (indoor) $15,000; Singles and doubles draws	(Czech Republic) Marek Jaloviec; 4–6, 7–5, 6–3	(Czech Republic) Petr Michnev	(Czech Republic) Jan Šátral (Slovakia) Lukáš Klein	(Czech Republic) Matěj Vocel (Czech Republic) Patrik Rikl (Poland) Karol Drzewiecki (Czech Republic) Michael Vrbenský
October 30	Czech Republic F8 Futures; Opava, Czech Republic; Hard (indoor) $15,000; Singles and doubles draws	(Poland) Karol Drzewiecki (Poland) Maciej Smoła; 7–6^{(7–4)}, 6–7^{(4–7)}, [10–8]	(Poland) Mateusz Kowalczyk (Poland) Szymon Walków	(Czech Republic) Jan Šátral (Slovakia) Lukáš Klein	(Czech Republic) Matěj Vocel (Czech Republic) Patrik Rikl (Poland) Karol Drzewiecki (Czech Republic) Michael Vrbenský
October 30	Egypt F32 Futures; Sharm El Sheikh, Egypt; Hard $15,000; Singles and doubles draws	(Poland) Paweł Ciaś; 6–3, 6–4	(Netherlands) Ryan Nijboer	(Ukraine) Vladyslav Manafov (Norway) Viktor Durasovic	(United Kingdom) Finn Bass (Russia) Artur Shakhnubaryan (United Kingdom) Ryan James Storrie (United States) Michael Zhu
October 30	Egypt F32 Futures; Sharm El Sheikh, Egypt; Hard $15,000; Singles and doubles draws	(Hungary) Gábor Borsos (Ukraine) Vladyslav Manafov; 7–6^{(7–2)}, 7–5	(Ukraine) Olexiy Kolisnyk (Ukraine) Oleg Prihodko	(Ukraine) Vladyslav Manafov (Norway) Viktor Durasovic	(United Kingdom) Finn Bass (Russia) Artur Shakhnubaryan (United Kingdom) Ryan James Storrie (United States) Michael Zhu
October 30	Estonia F3 Futures; Tallinn, Estonia; Hard (indoor) $15,000; Singles and doubles draws	(Russia) Evgenii Tiurnev; 7–6^{(7–4)}, 6–3	(Russia) Evgeny Karlovskiy	(France) Grégoire Jacq (Belgium) Maxime Authom	(France) Sébastien Boltz (France) Grégoire Barrère (Sweden) Jonathan Mridha (Finland) Harri Heliövaara
October 30	Estonia F3 Futures; Tallinn, Estonia; Hard (indoor) $15,000; Singles and doubles draws	(Finland) Harri Heliövaara (Finland) Patrik Niklas-Salminen; 6–2, 6–3	(Belgium) Maxime Authom (France) Grégoire Barrère	(France) Grégoire Jacq (Belgium) Maxime Authom	(France) Sébastien Boltz (France) Grégoire Barrère (Sweden) Jonathan Mridha (Finland) Harri Heliövaara
October 30	Greece F7 Futures; Heraklion, Greece; Hard $15,000; Singles and doubles draws	(Spain) Andrés Artuñedo; 6–2, 6–3	(Austria) Matthias Haim	(United Kingdom) Billy Harris (France) Laurent Lokoli	(Czech Republic) Václav Šafránek (Serbia) Milan Drinić (Czech Republic) Jaroslav Pospíšil (Netherlands) Tallon Griekspoor
October 30	Greece F7 Futures; Heraklion, Greece; Hard $15,000; Singles and doubles draws	(Switzerland) Adrian Bodmer (Austria) Matthias Haim; 7–6^{(7–5)}, 6–4	(Belgium) Germain Gigounon (Czech Republic) Dominik Kellovský	(United Kingdom) Billy Harris (France) Laurent Lokoli	(Czech Republic) Václav Šafránek (Serbia) Milan Drinić (Czech Republic) Jaroslav Pospíšil (Netherlands) Tallon Griekspoor
October 30	Kuwait F1 Futures; Mishref, Kuwait; Hard $15,000; Singles and doubles draws	(Austria) Maximilian Neuchrist; 7–6^{(7–4)}, 6–3	(Italy) Alessandro Bega	(Zimbabwe) Benjamin Lock (Austria) David Pichler	(France) Lény Mitjana (Belgium) Jeroen Vanneste (France) Tak Khunn Wang (Kuwait) Abdulhamid Mubarak
October 30	Kuwait F1 Futures; Mishref, Kuwait; Hard $15,000; Singles and doubles draws	(United States) Robert Galloway (Zimbabwe) Benjamin Lock; 7–6^{(8–6)}, 7–5	(India) Chandril Sood (India) Lakshit Sood	(Zimbabwe) Benjamin Lock (Austria) David Pichler	(France) Lény Mitjana (Belgium) Jeroen Vanneste (France) Tak Khunn Wang (Kuwait) Abdulhamid Mubarak
October 30	Malaysia F3 Futures; Kuala Lumpur, Malaysia; Hard $15,000; Singles and doubles draws	(Netherlands) Scott Griekspoor; 6–4, 6–2	(Croatia) Borna Gojo	(Uzbekistan) Jurabek Karimov (United States) Evan Song	(United States) Hady Habib (India) Suraj Prabodh (France) Antoine Escoffier (Germany) Lukas Ollert
October 30	Malaysia F3 Futures; Kuala Lumpur, Malaysia; Hard $15,000; Singles and doubles draws	(Uzbekistan) Jurabek Karimov (China) Wang Aoran; 7–6^{(7–5)}, 6–4	(Japan) Yuichi Ito (Thailand) Nuttanon Kadchapanan	(Uzbekistan) Jurabek Karimov (United States) Evan Song	(United States) Hady Habib (India) Suraj Prabodh (France) Antoine Escoffier (Germany) Lukas Ollert
October 30	Morocco F4 Futures; Casablanca, Morocco; Clay $15,000; Singles and doubles draws	(Lithuania) Laurynas Grigelis; 4–6, 6–2, 7–5	(Morocco) Lamine Ouahab	(Germany) George von Massow (Spain) Bernabé Zapata Miralles	(Argentina) Nicolás Uryson (Netherlands) Colin van Beem (Italy) Marco Di Prima (Austria) Peter Goldsteiner
October 30	Morocco F4 Futures; Casablanca, Morocco; Clay $15,000; Singles and doubles draws	(Morocco) Amine Ahouda (Morocco) Lamine Ouahab; 6–2, 3–6, [10–6]	(Lithuania) Laurynas Grigelis (France) Laurent Rochette	(Germany) George von Massow (Spain) Bernabé Zapata Miralles	(Argentina) Nicolás Uryson (Netherlands) Colin van Beem (Italy) Marco Di Prima (Austria) Peter Goldsteiner
October 30	Tunisia F33 Futures; Hammamet, Tunisia; Clay $15,000; Singles and doubles draws	(Portugal) João Monteiro; 7–6^{(9–7)}, 6–3	(France) Samuel Bensoussan	(Romania) Gabi Adrian Boitan (France) Elliot Benchetrit	(Italy) Nicolò Turchetti (Tunisia) Moez Echargui (Spain) Javier Barranco Cosano (Russia) Ronald Slobodchikov
October 30	Tunisia F33 Futures; Hammamet, Tunisia; Clay $15,000; Singles and doubles draws	(Italy) Alessandro Petrone (Italy) Nicolò Turchetti; 4–6, 6–3, [10–7]	(Portugal) Francisco Cabral (Portugal) Nuno Deus	(Romania) Gabi Adrian Boitan (France) Elliot Benchetrit	(Italy) Nicolò Turchetti (Tunisia) Moez Echargui (Spain) Javier Barranco Cosano (Russia) Ronald Slobodchikov
October 30	Turkey F41 Futures; Antalya, Turkey; Clay $15,000; Singles and doubles draws	(Belgium) Kimmer Coppejans; 6–0, 6–0	(Italy) Davide Galoppini	(Austria) Dennis Novak (Russia) Ivan Nedelko	(Croatia) Duje Kekez (Croatia) Domagoj Bilješko (Brazil) Thiago Seyboth Wild (Russia) Timur Kiyamov
October 30	Turkey F41 Futures; Antalya, Turkey; Clay $15,000; Singles and doubles draws	(France) Florent Diep (Ecuador) Diego Hidalgo; 6–3, 6–4	(Brazil) Felipe Meligeni Alves (Brazil) Christian Oliveira	(Austria) Dennis Novak (Russia) Ivan Nedelko	(Croatia) Duje Kekez (Croatia) Domagoj Bilješko (Brazil) Thiago Seyboth Wild (Russia) Timur Kiyamov
October 30	USA F35 Futures; Birmingham, United States; Clay $15,000; Singles and doubles draws	(Dominican Republic) Roberto Cid Subervi; 4–6, 6–3, 6–1	(Italy) Fabrizio Ornago	(Sweden) Gustav Hansson (Germany) Julian Lenz	(Mexico) Luis Patiño (Colombia) Felipe Mantilla (Brazil) Gabriel Friedrich (Argentina) Matías Zukas
October 30	USA F35 Futures; Birmingham, United States; Clay $15,000; Singles and doubles draws	(United States) Raleigh Smith (United States) Wil Spencer; 6–2, 7–6^{(7–3)}	(Bolivia) Boris Arias (United States) Nick Chappell	(Sweden) Gustav Hansson (Germany) Julian Lenz	(Mexico) Luis Patiño (Colombia) Felipe Mantilla (Brazil) Gabriel Friedrich (Argentina) Matías Zukas

=== November ===
Week of	Tournament	Winner	Runners-up	Semifinalists	Quarterfinalists
November 6	Argentina F8 Futures; Corrientes, Argentina; Clay $15,000; Singles and doubles draws	(Brazil) Daniel Dutra da Silva; 6–4, 7–6^{(7–3)}	(Argentina) Agustín Velotti	(Argentina) Sebastián Báez (Argentina) Juan Ignacio Galarza	(Argentina) Gonzalo Villanueva (Argentina) Gerónimo Espín Busleiman (Argentina) Mateo Nicolás Martínez (Argentina) Facundo Juárez
November 6	Argentina F8 Futures; Corrientes, Argentina; Clay $15,000; Singles and doubles draws	(Argentina) Tomás Lipovšek Puches (Argentina) Juan Pablo Paz; 7–5, 2–6, [10–8]	(Argentina) Valentín Florez (Argentina) Eduardo Agustín Torre	(Argentina) Sebastián Báez (Argentina) Juan Ignacio Galarza	(Argentina) Gonzalo Villanueva (Argentina) Gerónimo Espín Busleiman (Argentina) Mateo Nicolás Martínez (Argentina) Facundo Juárez
November 6	Czech Republic F9 Futures; Milovice, Czech Republic; Hard (indoor) $15,000; Singles and doubles draws	(Czech Republic) Marek Jaloviec; 6–3, 6–4	(Czech Republic) Jan Šátral	(Czech Republic) Michal Konečný (Czech Republic) Petr Michnev	(Germany) Elmar Ejupovic (Czech Republic) Petr Nouza (Germany) Peter Heller (Czech Republic) Matěj Vocel
November 6	Czech Republic F9 Futures; Milovice, Czech Republic; Hard (indoor) $15,000; Singles and doubles draws	(Czech Republic) Marek Gengel (Poland) Szymon Walków; 6–3, 6–7^{(4–7)}, [10–5]	(Czech Republic) Filip Duda (Czech Republic) Michal Konečný	(Czech Republic) Michal Konečný (Czech Republic) Petr Michnev	(Germany) Elmar Ejupovic (Czech Republic) Petr Nouza (Germany) Peter Heller (Czech Republic) Matěj Vocel
November 6	Egypt F33 Futures; Sharm El Sheikh, Egypt; Hard $15,000; Singles and doubles draws	(Norway) Viktor Durasovic; 6–7^{(4–7)}, 6–4, 6–4	(Spain) Pablo Vivero González	(Poland) Paweł Ciaś (Russia) Roman Safiullin	(Russia) Anton Zaitcev (France) Thomas Bréchemier (Ukraine) Vladyslav Manafov (Spain) Roberto Ortega Olmedo
November 6	Egypt F33 Futures; Sharm El Sheikh, Egypt; Hard $15,000; Singles and doubles draws	(Poland) Adrian Andrzejczuk (Ukraine) Vladyslav Manafov; 6–1, 6–0	(Turkey) Tuna Altuna (Turkey) Cem İlkel	(Poland) Paweł Ciaś (Russia) Roman Safiullin	(Russia) Anton Zaitcev (France) Thomas Bréchemier (Ukraine) Vladyslav Manafov (Spain) Roberto Ortega Olmedo
November 6	Estonia F4 Futures; Pärnu, Estonia; Hard (indoor) $15,000; Singles and doubles draws	(Ukraine) Denys Mylokostov; 7–6^{(7–5)}, 6–0	(Russia) Evgenii Tiurnev	(Finland) Harri Heliövaara (Estonia) Kenneth Raisma	(Russia) Pavel Kotov (Sweden) Jonathan Mridha (Finland) Emil Ruusuvuori (Belgium) Maxime Authom
November 6	Estonia F4 Futures; Pärnu, Estonia; Hard (indoor) $15,000; Singles and doubles draws	(Belarus) Ivan Liutarevich (Ukraine) Denys Mylokostov; 4–6, 6–3, [12–10]	(Ukraine) Marat Deviatiarov (Russia) Alexander Igoshin	(Finland) Harri Heliövaara (Estonia) Kenneth Raisma	(Russia) Pavel Kotov (Sweden) Jonathan Mridha (Finland) Emil Ruusuvuori (Belgium) Maxime Authom
November 6	Greece F8 Futures; Heraklion, Greece; Hard $15,000; Singles and doubles draws	(Netherlands) Tallon Griekspoor; 6–4, 6–2	(Spain) Carlos Gómez-Herrera	(France) Yannick Jankovits (Czech Republic) Vít Kopřiva	(Spain) Andrés Artuñedo (Germany) Christian Hirschmüller (Switzerland) Adrian Bodmer (Italy) Gianluca Di Nicola
November 6	Greece F8 Futures; Heraklion, Greece; Hard $15,000; Singles and doubles draws	(Serbia) Marko Djokovic (Spain) Carlos Gómez-Herrera; 6–1, 6–2	(United States) Conor Berg (United States) Mousheg Hovhannisyan	(France) Yannick Jankovits (Czech Republic) Vít Kopřiva	(Spain) Andrés Artuñedo (Germany) Christian Hirschmüller (Switzerland) Adrian Bodmer (Italy) Gianluca Di Nicola
November 6	Kuwait F2 Futures; Mishref, Kuwait; Hard $15,000; Singles and doubles draws	(Austria) Maximilian Neuchrist; 7–6^{(7–5)}, 6–1	(Russia) Kristian Lozan	(Italy) Filippo Leonardi (France) Lény Mitjana	(Germany) Daniel Altmaier (Spain) José Francisco Vidal Azorín (Netherlands) Scott Griekspoor (Belgium) Jeroen Vanneste
November 6	Kuwait F2 Futures; Mishref, Kuwait; Hard $15,000; Singles and doubles draws	(United States) Robert Galloway (Zimbabwe) Benjamin Lock; 6–3, 6–2	(France) Baptiste Crepatte (France) Lény Mitjana	(Italy) Filippo Leonardi (France) Lény Mitjana	(Germany) Daniel Altmaier (Spain) José Francisco Vidal Azorín (Netherlands) Scott Griekspoor (Belgium) Jeroen Vanneste
November 6	Morocco F5 Futures; Beni Mellal, Morocco; Clay $15,000; Singles and doubles draws	(Lithuania) Laurynas Grigelis; 6–1, 6–2	(Spain) Bernabé Zapata Miralles	(Russia) Ivan Gakhov (Serbia) Miljan Zekić	(Brazil) Jordan Correia (Italy) Raúl Brancaccio (Morocco) Lamine Ouahab (Spain) Pol Toledo Bagué
November 6	Morocco F5 Futures; Beni Mellal, Morocco; Clay $15,000; Singles and doubles draws	(Spain) Javier Barranco Cosano (Italy) Raúl Brancaccio; 2–6, 6–2, [10–4]	(Morocco) Amine Ahouda (Morocco) Lamine Ouahab	(Russia) Ivan Gakhov (Serbia) Miljan Zekić	(Brazil) Jordan Correia (Italy) Raúl Brancaccio (Morocco) Lamine Ouahab (Spain) Pol Toledo Bagué
November 6	Tunisia F34 Futures; Hammamet, Tunisia; Clay $15,000; Singles and doubles draws	(Croatia) Nino Serdarušić; 6–4, 5–7, 6–2	(Spain) Eduard Esteve Lobato	(France) Samuel Bensoussan (Spain) Marc Giner	(Spain) Oriol Roca Batalla (Italy) Adelchi Virgili (Spain) Sergio Gutiérrez Ferrol (Italy) Alesandro Petrone
November 6	Tunisia F34 Futures; Hammamet, Tunisia; Clay $15,000; Singles and doubles draws	(Serbia) Nikola Ćaćić (Croatia) Nino Serdarušić; 6–2, 6–1	(Spain) Marc Giner (Spain) Jaume Pla Malfeito	(France) Samuel Bensoussan (Spain) Marc Giner	(Spain) Oriol Roca Batalla (Italy) Adelchi Virgili (Spain) Sergio Gutiérrez Ferrol (Italy) Alesandro Petrone
November 6	Turkey F42 Futures; Antalya, Turkey; Clay $15,000; Singles and doubles draws	(Brazil) Thiago Seyboth Wild; 6–4, 6–4	(Italy) Riccardo Bonadio	(Croatia) Mate Delić (Italy) Davide Galoppini	(Hong Kong) Wong Hong Kit (Germany) Peter Torebko (Ecuador) Diego Hidalgo (Russia) Andrey Chepelev
November 6	Turkey F42 Futures; Antalya, Turkey; Clay $15,000; Singles and doubles draws	(Ecuador) Diego Hidalgo (Brazil) Thiago Seyboth Wild; 6–2, 6–3	(Turkey) Koray Kırcı (Japan) Takashi Saito	(Croatia) Mate Delić (Italy) Davide Galoppini	(Hong Kong) Wong Hong Kit (Germany) Peter Torebko (Ecuador) Diego Hidalgo (Russia) Andrey Chepelev
November 6	USA F36 Futures; Niceville, United States; Clay $15,000; Singles and doubles draws	(United States) Patrick Kypson; 7–5, 5–7, 6–1	(United States) Sekou Bangoura	(Italy) Fabrizio Ornago (Mexico) Luis Patiño	(United States) Oliver Crawford (Argentina) Santiago Rodríguez Taverna (United States) Christopher Haworth (United States) Wil Spencer
November 6	USA F36 Futures; Niceville, United States; Clay $15,000; Singles and doubles draws	(Colombia) Juan Manuel Benítez Chavarriaga (Germany) Julian Lenz; 7–5, 4–6, [10–7]	(Bolivia) Boris Arias (United States) Nick Chappell	(Italy) Fabrizio Ornago (Mexico) Luis Patiño	(United States) Oliver Crawford (Argentina) Santiago Rodríguez Taverna (United States) Christopher Haworth (United States) Wil Spencer
November 6	Vietnam F1 Futures; Thủ Dầu Một, Vietnam; Hard $15,000; Singles and doubles draws	(France) Enzo Couacaud; 6–1, 6–1	(Kyrgyzstan) Daniiar Duldaev	(Vietnam) Lý Hoàng Nam (Chinese Taipei) Wu Tung-lin	(Chinese Taipei) Chen Ti (Australia) Blake Ellis (Bulgaria) Vasko Mladenov (Japan) Rio Noguchi
November 6	Vietnam F1 Futures; Thủ Dầu Một, Vietnam; Hard $15,000; Singles and doubles draws	(Japan) Sho Katayama (Japan) Arata Onozawa; 7–6^{(7–5)}, 6–4	(Australia) Blake Ellis (Australia) Michael Look	(Vietnam) Lý Hoàng Nam (Chinese Taipei) Wu Tung-lin	(Chinese Taipei) Chen Ti (Australia) Blake Ellis (Bulgaria) Vasko Mladenov (Japan) Rio Noguchi
November 13	Finland F4 Futures; Helsinki, Finland; Hard (indoor) $25,000; Singles and doubles draws	(Finland) Emil Ruusuvuori; 4–6, 6–0, 6–1	(Russia) Evgeny Karlovskiy	(Egypt) Mohamed Safwat (France) Tom Jomby	(Germany) Robin Kern (France) Albano Olivetti (Estonia) Kenneth Raisma (Russia) Evgenii Tiurnev
November 13	Finland F4 Futures; Helsinki, Finland; Hard (indoor) $25,000; Singles and doubles draws	(Russia) Evgeny Karlovskiy (Egypt) Mohamed Safwat; 7–6^{(7–2)}, 6–4	(Russia) Vladimir Polyakov (Russia) Evgenii Tiurnev	(Egypt) Mohamed Safwat (France) Tom Jomby	(Germany) Robin Kern (France) Albano Olivetti (Estonia) Kenneth Raisma (Russia) Evgenii Tiurnev
November 13	Argentina F9 Futures; Santa Fe, Argentina; Clay $15,000; Singles and doubles draws	(Uruguay) Martín Cuevas; 6–1, 6–0	(Argentina) Gerónimo Espín Busleiman	(Argentina) Manuel Peña López (Argentina) Federico Moreno	(Argentina) Agustín Velotti (Argentina) Juan Ignacio Galarza (Argentina) Juan Pablo Paz (Argentina) Mariano Kestelboim
November 13	Argentina F9 Futures; Santa Fe, Argentina; Clay $15,000; Singles and doubles draws	(Argentina) Hernán Casanova (Argentina) Tomás Lipovšek Puches; 7–6^{(7–3)}, 1–6, [10–8]	(Argentina) Gerónimo Espín Busleiman (Argentina) Facundo Juárez	(Argentina) Manuel Peña López (Argentina) Federico Moreno	(Argentina) Agustín Velotti (Argentina) Juan Ignacio Galarza (Argentina) Juan Pablo Paz (Argentina) Mariano Kestelboim
November 13	Brazil F2 Futures; Santos, Brazil; Clay $15,000; Singles and doubles draws	(Brazil) Rafael Matos; 6–2, 3–6, 6–3	(Brazil) Wilson Leite	(Brazil) Nicolas Santos (Brazil) Daniel Dutra da Silva	(Sweden) Christian Lindell (Brazil) José Pereira (Brazil) Oscar José Gutierrez (Brazil) André Miele
November 13	Brazil F2 Futures; Santos, Brazil; Clay $15,000; Singles and doubles draws	(Brazil) Orlando Luz (Brazil) Marcelo Zormann; 6–3, 6–3	(Brazil) Caio Silva (Brazil) Thales Turini	(Brazil) Nicolas Santos (Brazil) Daniel Dutra da Silva	(Sweden) Christian Lindell (Brazil) José Pereira (Brazil) Oscar José Gutierrez (Brazil) André Miele
November 13	Czech Republic F10 Futures; Říčany, Czech Republic; Hard (indoor) $15,000; Singles and doubles draws	(Czech Republic) Marek Jaloviec; 7–6^{(7–4)}, 6–2	(Germany) Marvin Möller	(Czech Republic) Michal Konečný (Czech Republic) Petr Nouza	(Germany) Elmar Ejupovic (Czech Republic) Marek Gengel (Netherlands) Niels Lootsma (United Kingdom) Tom Farquharson
November 13	Czech Republic F10 Futures; Říčany, Czech Republic; Hard (indoor) $15,000; Singles and doubles draws	(Poland) Karol Drzewiecki (Poland) Szymon Walków; 3–6, 6–3, [10–8]	(Czech Republic) Matěj Vocel (Czech Republic) Michael Vrbenský	(Czech Republic) Michal Konečný (Czech Republic) Petr Nouza	(Germany) Elmar Ejupovic (Czech Republic) Marek Gengel (Netherlands) Niels Lootsma (United Kingdom) Tom Farquharson
November 13	Egypt F34 Futures; Sharm El Sheikh, Egypt; Hard $15,000; Singles and doubles draws	(Russia) Roman Safiullin; 7–5, 7–6^{(7–3)}	(Turkey) Cem İlkel	(France) Alexandre Müller (Ukraine) Vladyslav Manafov	(Spain) David Pérez Sanz (Belgium) Jonas Merckx (Ukraine) Olexiy Kolisnyk (Switzerland) Johan Nikles
November 13	Egypt F34 Futures; Sharm El Sheikh, Egypt; Hard $15,000; Singles and doubles draws	(Ukraine) Vladyslav Manafov (Spain) Roberto Ortega Olmedo; 6–3, 6–4	(Turkey) Tuna Altuna (Turkey) Cem İlkel	(France) Alexandre Müller (Ukraine) Vladyslav Manafov	(Spain) David Pérez Sanz (Belgium) Jonas Merckx (Ukraine) Olexiy Kolisnyk (Switzerland) Johan Nikles
November 13	Greece F9 Futures; Heraklion, Greece; Hard $15,000; Singles and doubles draws	(Spain) Carlos Gómez-Herrera; 7–6^{(7–3)}, 6–1	(Germany) Jakob Sude	(Spain) Andrés Artuñedo (Belarus) Yaraslav Shyla	(Brazil) João Menezes (Netherlands) Gijs Brouwer (Guatemala) Christopher Díaz Figueroa (Netherlands) Jelle Sels
November 13	Greece F9 Futures; Heraklion, Greece; Hard $15,000; Singles and doubles draws	(Italy) Marco Bortolotti (United States) Miles Seemann; 7–6^{(7–1)}, 4–6, [10–7]	(Turkey) Altuğ Çelikbilek (Belarus) Yaraslav Shyla	(Spain) Andrés Artuñedo (Belarus) Yaraslav Shyla	(Brazil) João Menezes (Netherlands) Gijs Brouwer (Guatemala) Christopher Díaz Figueroa (Netherlands) Jelle Sels
November 13	Kuwait F3 Futures; Mishref, Kuwait; Hard $15,000; Singles and doubles draws	(Austria) Maximilian Neuchrist; 7–5, 6–4	(France) Baptise Crepatte	(Russia) Kristian Lozan (Italy) Filippo Leonardi	(Canada) Alexander Day (Netherlands) Marc Dijkhuizen (Zimbabwe) Benjamin Lock (France) Lény Mitjana
November 13	Kuwait F3 Futures; Mishref, Kuwait; Hard $15,000; Singles and doubles draws	(United States) Robert Galloway (Zimbabwe) Benjamin Lock; 6–2, 6–1	(Netherlands) Marc Dijkhuizen (Serbia) Darko Jandrić	(Russia) Kristian Lozan (Italy) Filippo Leonardi	(Canada) Alexander Day (Netherlands) Marc Dijkhuizen (Zimbabwe) Benjamin Lock (France) Lény Mitjana
November 13	Mexico F5 Futures; Campeche, Mexico; Hard $15,000; Singles and doubles draws	(United States) Evan Song; 6–2, 6–2	(Mexico) Manuel Sánchez	(Colombia) Alejandro Gómez (Peru) Jorge Panta	(Mexico) Juan Ignacio Batalla Díez (Switzerland) Marc-Andrea Hüsler (United States) Alexios Halebian (United States) Connor Farren
November 13	Mexico F5 Futures; Campeche, Mexico; Hard $15,000; Singles and doubles draws	(Colombia) José Daniel Bendeck (Colombia) Alejandro Gómez; 6–3, 3–6, [10–7]	(Switzerland) Marc-Andrea Hüsler (Switzerland) Jessy Kalambay	(Colombia) Alejandro Gómez (Peru) Jorge Panta	(Mexico) Juan Ignacio Batalla Díez (Switzerland) Marc-Andrea Hüsler (United States) Alexios Halebian (United States) Connor Farren
November 13	Morocco F6 Futures; Agadir, Morocco; Clay $15,000; Singles and doubles draws	(Russia) Ivan Gakhov; 7–6^{(7–5)}, 7–5	(Spain) Pol Toledo Bagué	(Spain) Miguel Semmler (Morocco) Lamine Ouahab	(Morocco) Amine Ahouda (Italy) Raúl Brancaccio (Germany) George von Massow (Spain) Albert Acaraz Ivorra
November 13	Morocco F6 Futures; Agadir, Morocco; Clay $15,000; Singles and doubles draws	(Spain) Javier Barranco Cosano (Italy) Raúl Brancaccio; 6–2, 6–2	(Spain) Sergio Martos Gornés (Spain) Pol Toledo Bagué	(Spain) Miguel Semmler (Morocco) Lamine Ouahab	(Morocco) Amine Ahouda (Italy) Raúl Brancaccio (Germany) George von Massow (Spain) Albert Acaraz Ivorra
November 13	Tunisia F35 Futures; Hammamet, Tunisia; Clay $15,000; Singles and doubles draws	(Serbia) Nikola Ćaćić; 6–1, 6–2	(Spain) Carlos Boluda-Purkiss	(Croatia) Nino Serdarušić (Spain) Marc Giner	(Spain) Oriol Roca Batalla (Spain) David Vega Hernández (France) Samuel Bensoussan (Belgium) Zizou Bergs
November 13	Tunisia F35 Futures; Hammamet, Tunisia; Clay $15,000; Singles and doubles draws	(Serbia) Nikola Ćaćić (Croatia) Nino Serdarušić; 7–5, 6–3	(Tunisia) Moez Echargui (Tunisia) Anis Ghorbel	(Croatia) Nino Serdarušić (Spain) Marc Giner	(Spain) Oriol Roca Batalla (Spain) David Vega Hernández (France) Samuel Bensoussan (Belgium) Zizou Bergs
November 13	Turkey F43 Futures; Antalya, Turkey; Clay $15,000; Singles and doubles draws	(France) Laurent Rochette; 7–6^{(7–3)}, 1–0, ret.	(Italy) Riccardo Bonadio	(Bulgaria) Alexandar Lazov (Spain) Jordi Samper Montaña	(Italy) Pietro Rondoni (Croatia) Mate Delić (Canada) Pavel Krainik (North Macedonia) Tomislav Jotovski
November 13	Turkey F43 Futures; Antalya, Turkey; Clay $15,000; Singles and doubles draws	(Italy) Riccardo Bonadio (Italy) Pietro Rondoni; 5–7, 6–3, [10–6]	(Canada) Pavel Krainik (Poland) Maciej Smoła	(Bulgaria) Alexandar Lazov (Spain) Jordi Samper Montaña	(Italy) Pietro Rondoni (Croatia) Mate Delić (Canada) Pavel Krainik (North Macedonia) Tomislav Jotovski
November 13	USA F37 Futures; Pensacola, United States; Clay $15,000; Singles and doubles draws	(Ecuador) Emilio Gómez; 3–6, 7–5, 6–1	(United States) Ulises Blanch	(Dominican Republic) Roberto Cid Subervi (Portugal) Nuno Borges	(United States) William Grant (Spain) Alberto Barroso Campos (United States) Jonathan Chang (Portugal) Duarte Vale
November 13	USA F37 Futures; Pensacola, United States; Clay $15,000; Singles and doubles draws	(United States) Hunter Johnson (United States) Yates Johnson; 6–3, 6–3	(United States) Harrison Adams (United States) Junior Alexander Ore	(Dominican Republic) Roberto Cid Subervi (Portugal) Nuno Borges	(United States) William Grant (Spain) Alberto Barroso Campos (United States) Jonathan Chang (Portugal) Duarte Vale
November 13	Vietnam F2 Futures; Thủ Dầu Một, Vietnam; Hard $15,000; Singles and doubles draws	(United Kingdom) Jonathan Gray; 7–6^{(7–4)}, 6–3	(Vietnam) Lý Hoàng Nam	(India) Sasikumar Mukund (France) Enzo Couacaud	(Japan) Sho Katayama (Switzerland) Jakub Paul (Réunion) César Testoni (Uzbekistan) Sanjar Fayziev
November 13	Vietnam F2 Futures; Thủ Dầu Một, Vietnam; Hard $15,000; Singles and doubles draws	(Netherlands) Miliaan Niesten (Italy) Francesco Vilardo; 6–2, 7–6^{(7–3)}	(Kyrgyzstan) Daniiar Duldaev (Uzbekistan) Sanjar Fayziev	(India) Sasikumar Mukund (France) Enzo Couacaud	(Japan) Sho Katayama (Switzerland) Jakub Paul (Réunion) César Testoni (Uzbekistan) Sanjar Fayziev
November 20	Indonesia F7 Futures; Jakarta, Indonesia; Hard $25,000; Singles and doubles draws	(Japan) Renta Tokuda; 6–7^{(4–7)}, 6–2, 7–5	(Australia) Alexei Popyrin	(South Korea) Lee Duck-hee (Japan) Shintaro Imai	(Chinese Taipei) Wu Tung-lin (Japan) Kento Takeuchi (India) Manish Sureshkumar (Chinese Taipei) Chen Ti
November 20	Indonesia F7 Futures; Jakarta, Indonesia; Hard $25,000; Singles and doubles draws	(Indonesia) Justin Barki (Indonesia) Christopher Rungkat; 6–3, 1–6, [11–9]	(Japan) Shintaro Imai (Japan) Renta Tokuda	(South Korea) Lee Duck-hee (Japan) Shintaro Imai	(Chinese Taipei) Wu Tung-lin (Japan) Kento Takeuchi (India) Manish Sureshkumar (Chinese Taipei) Chen Ti
November 20	USA F38 Futures; Columbus, United States; Hard (indoor) $25,000; Singles and doubles draws	(United Kingdom) Alexander Ward; 6–4, 6–4	(United Kingdom) Luke Bambridge	(Canada) Samuel Monette (Australia) Aleksandar Vukic	(United States) Jeffrey Schorsch (Denmark) Mikael Torpegaard (United States) Evan Zhu (United States) Alexander Sarkissian
November 20	USA F38 Futures; Columbus, United States; Hard (indoor) $25,000; Singles and doubles draws	(Mexico) Hans Hach Verdugo (Venezuela) Luis David Martínez; 3–6, 7–6^{(7–2)}, [10–7]	(United Kingdom) Luke Bambridge (United Kingdom) Edward Corrie	(Canada) Samuel Monette (Australia) Aleksandar Vukic	(United States) Jeffrey Schorsch (Denmark) Mikael Torpegaard (United States) Evan Zhu (United States) Alexander Sarkissian
November 20	Argentina F10 Futures; Villa del Dique, Argentina; Clay $15,000; Singles and doubles draws	(Argentina) Juan Ignacio Galarza; 6–4, 6–4	(Argentina) Tomás Lipovšek Puches	(Argentina) Gonzalo Villanueva (Argentina) Manuel Peña López	(Argentina) Gerónimo Espín Busleiman (Argentina) Facundo Juárez (Argentina) Valentín Florez (Argentina) Ignacio Monzón
November 20	Argentina F10 Futures; Villa del Dique, Argentina; Clay $15,000; Singles and doubles draws	(Argentina) Franco Emanuel Egea (Venezuela) David Souto; 6–2, 6–3	(Argentina) Juan Ignacio Galarza (Argentina) Tomás Lipovšek Puches	(Argentina) Gonzalo Villanueva (Argentina) Manuel Peña López	(Argentina) Gerónimo Espín Busleiman (Argentina) Facundo Juárez (Argentina) Valentín Florez (Argentina) Ignacio Monzón
November 20	Brazil F3 Futures; São Paulo, Brazil; Clay $15,000; Singles and doubles draws	(Brazil) José Pereira; 6–4, 6–3	(Portugal) Bernardo Saraiva	(Brazil) Alexandre Tsuchiya (Brazil) João Lucas Reis da Silva	(Brazil) Daniel Dutra da Silva (Mexico) Tigre Hank (Brazil) Eduardo Dischinger (Russia) Petr Arkhipov
November 20	Brazil F3 Futures; São Paulo, Brazil; Clay $15,000; Singles and doubles draws	(Brazil) Rafael Matos (Brazil) Marcelo Zormann; 7–6^{(8–6)}, 5–7, [10–8]	(Brazil) Caio Silva (Brazil) Thales Turini	(Brazil) Alexandre Tsuchiya (Brazil) João Lucas Reis da Silva	(Brazil) Daniel Dutra da Silva (Mexico) Tigre Hank (Brazil) Eduardo Dischinger (Russia) Petr Arkhipov
November 20	Chile F1 Futures; Curicó, Chile; Clay $15,000; Singles and doubles draws	(Argentina) Mariano Kestelboim; 7–6^{(13–11)}, 3–6, 2–0, ret.	(Chile) Gonzalo Lama	(Chile) Juan Carlos Sáez (Chile) Víctor Núñez	(Peru) Juan Pablo Varillas (Argentina) Leonardo Aboian (Italy) Fabrizio Ornago (Argentina) Nicolás Alberto Arreche
November 20	Chile F1 Futures; Curicó, Chile; Clay $15,000; Singles and doubles draws	(Argentina) Matías Franco Descotte (Chile) Alejandro Tabilo; 6–2, 6–3	(Argentina) Mariano Kestelboim (Argentina) Matías Zukas	(Chile) Juan Carlos Sáez (Chile) Víctor Núñez	(Peru) Juan Pablo Varillas (Argentina) Leonardo Aboian (Italy) Fabrizio Ornago (Argentina) Nicolás Alberto Arreche
November 20	Czech Republic F11 Futures; Valašské Meziříčí, Czech Republic; Hard (indoor) $15,000; Singles and doubles draws	(Russia) Pavel Kotov; 6–0, 7–5	(France) Dan Added	(Czech Republic) Marek Gengel (France) Yanais Laurent	(Czech Republic) Michael Vrbenský (Netherlands) Niels Lootsma (Czech Republic) David Poljak (Czech Republic) Dominik Kellovský
November 20	Czech Republic F11 Futures; Valašské Meziříčí, Czech Republic; Hard (indoor) $15,000; Singles and doubles draws	(Czech Republic) Filip Duda (France) Yanais Laurent; 6–4, 7–5	(Czech Republic) Marek Gengel (Czech Republic) Matěj Vocel	(Czech Republic) Marek Gengel (France) Yanais Laurent	(Czech Republic) Michael Vrbenský (Netherlands) Niels Lootsma (Czech Republic) David Poljak (Czech Republic) Dominik Kellovský
November 20	Egypt F35 Futures; Sharm El Sheikh, Egypt; Hard $15,000; Singles and doubles draws	(Belgium) Romain Barbosa; 6–3, 6–2	(Guatemala) Wilfredo González	(Ukraine) Vladyslav Manafov (Ukraine) Daniil Zarichanskyy	(Cyprus) Menelaos Efstathiou (Russia) Kristian Lozan (Ukraine) Olexiy Kolisnyk (United Kingdom) Finn Bass
November 20	Egypt F35 Futures; Sharm El Sheikh, Egypt; Hard $15,000; Singles and doubles draws	(Ukraine) Vladyslav Manafov (Spain) David Pérez Sanz; 6–2, 6–3	(Turkey) Tuna Altuna (Turkey) Cem İlkel	(Ukraine) Vladyslav Manafov (Ukraine) Daniil Zarichanskyy	(Cyprus) Menelaos Efstathiou (Russia) Kristian Lozan (Ukraine) Olexiy Kolisnyk (United Kingdom) Finn Bass
November 20	Greece F10 Futures; Heraklion, Greece; Hard $15,000; Singles and doubles draws	(France) Yannick Jankovits; 6–1, 7–5	(Belarus) Yaraslav Shyla	(Netherlands) Mick Veldheer (Turkey) Altuğ Çelikbilek	(Spain) Carlos Gómez-Herrera (Germany) Jakob Sude (Israel) Mor Bulis (Russia) Alexey Zakharov
November 20	Greece F10 Futures; Heraklion, Greece; Hard $15,000; Singles and doubles draws	(Turkey) Altuğ Çelikbilek (Guatemala) Christopher Díaz Figueroa; 6–2, 6–2	(Italy) Marco Bortolotti (Mexico) Lucas Gómez	(Netherlands) Mick Veldheer (Turkey) Altuğ Çelikbilek	(Spain) Carlos Gómez-Herrera (Germany) Jakob Sude (Israel) Mor Bulis (Russia) Alexey Zakharov
November 20	Mexico F6 Futures; Monterrey, Mexico; Hard $15,000; Singles and doubles draws	(France) Mick Lescure; 6–1, 6–2	(France) Florian Lakat	(United States) Ronnie Schneider (United States) Evan Song	(Colombia) Alejandro Gómez (United States) Jack Murray (Ecuador) Gonzalo Escobar (Monaco) Lucas Catarina
November 20	Mexico F6 Futures; Monterrey, Mexico; Hard $15,000; Singles and doubles draws	(Switzerland) Marc-Andrea Hüsler (Switzerland) Jessy Kalambay; 7–6^{(7–5)}, 6–4	(Ecuador) Gonzalo Escobar (Bolivia) Federico Zeballos	(United States) Ronnie Schneider (United States) Evan Song	(Colombia) Alejandro Gómez (United States) Jack Murray (Ecuador) Gonzalo Escobar (Monaco) Lucas Catarina
November 20	South Africa F1 Futures; Stellenbosch, South Africa; Hard $15,000; Singles and doubles draws	(South Africa) Nicolaas Scholtz; 6–4, 6–4	(France) Lény Mitjana	(Germany) Peter Heller (Zimbabwe) Takanyi Garanganga	(France) Tom Jomby (Zimbabwe) Benjamin Lock (United States) Gary Kushnirovich (Réunion) Quentin Robert
November 20	South Africa F1 Futures; Stellenbosch, South Africa; Hard $15,000; Singles and doubles draws	(United States) Robert Galloway (Zimbabwe) Benjamin Lock; 5–7, 6–2, [10–5]	(Germany) Peter Heller (Germany) George von Massow	(Germany) Peter Heller (Zimbabwe) Takanyi Garanganga	(France) Tom Jomby (Zimbabwe) Benjamin Lock (United States) Gary Kushnirovich (Réunion) Quentin Robert
November 20	Tunisia F36 Futures; Hammamet, Tunisia; Clay $15,000; Singles and doubles draws	(Spain) Oriol Roca Batalla; 6–4, 6–1	(Croatia) Nino Serdarušić	(Spain) Nikolás Sánchez Izquierdo (Italy) Cristian Carli	(Canada) Steven Diez (Spain) Carlos Boluda-Purkiss (Spain) Marc Fornell Mestres (Portugal) Fred Gil
November 20	Tunisia F36 Futures; Hammamet, Tunisia; Clay $15,000; Singles and doubles draws	(Spain) Marc Fornell Mestres (Portugal) Fred Gil; 6–2, 6–4	(Spain) Carlos Boluda-Purkiss (Spain) Oriol Roca Batalla	(Spain) Nikolás Sánchez Izquierdo (Italy) Cristian Carli	(Canada) Steven Diez (Spain) Carlos Boluda-Purkiss (Spain) Marc Fornell Mestres (Portugal) Fred Gil
November 20	Turkey F44 Futures; Antalya, Turkey; Clay $15,000; Singles and doubles draws	(Czech Republic) Pavel Nejedlý; 3–6, 6–2, 6–4	(Bulgaria) Alexandar Lazov	(France) Samuel Bensoussan (Italy) Pietro Rondoni	(Italy) Davide Galoppini (Russia) Andrey Chepelev (Spain) Jordi Samper Montaña (Iran) Shahin Khaledan
November 20	Turkey F44 Futures; Antalya, Turkey; Clay $15,000; Singles and doubles draws	(Ukraine) Vadim Alekseenko (Czech Republic) Pavel Nejedlý; 4–6, 7–5, [10–6]	(Chinese Taipei) Meng Cing-yang (Japan) Takashi Saito	(France) Samuel Bensoussan (Italy) Pietro Rondoni	(Italy) Davide Galoppini (Russia) Andrey Chepelev (Spain) Jordi Samper Montaña (Iran) Shahin Khaledan
November 20	Vietnam F3 Futures; Thủ Dầu Một, Vietnam; Hard $15,000; Singles and doubles draws	(India) Arjun Kadhe; 7–5, 6–3	(Australia) Andrew Harris	(United States) Nathan Pasha (Japan) Issei Okamura	(United States) Dusty Boyer (Kyrgyzstan) Daniiar Duldaev (Japan) Rio Noguchi (Vietnam) Lý Hoàng Nam
November 20	Vietnam F3 Futures; Thủ Dầu Một, Vietnam; Hard $15,000; Singles and doubles draws	(United States) Tyler Lu (Canada) Kelsey Stevenson; 7–6^{(7–5)}, 7–5	(Japan) Issei Okamura (Japan) Shunrou Takeshima	(United States) Nathan Pasha (Japan) Issei Okamura	(United States) Dusty Boyer (Kyrgyzstan) Daniiar Duldaev (Japan) Rio Noguchi (Vietnam) Lý Hoàng Nam
November 27	Indonesia F8 Futures; Jakarta, Indonesia; Hard $25,000; Singles and doubles draws	(South Korea) Lee Duck-hee; 6–3, 4–6, 7–6^{(8–6)}	(India) Prajnesh Gunneswaran	(India) Vijay Sundar Prashanth (Japan) Renta Tokuda	(Australia) Andrew Harris (Chinese Taipei) Yu Cheng-yu (Japan) Sora Fukuda (Japan) Kento Takeuchi
November 27	Indonesia F8 Futures; Jakarta, Indonesia; Hard $25,000; Singles and doubles draws	(Indonesia) Justin Barki (India) Vijay Sundar Prashanth; 4–6, 7–6^{(7–5)}, [10–4]	(Japan) Sora Fukuda (Australia) Scott Puodziunas	(India) Vijay Sundar Prashanth (Japan) Renta Tokuda	(Australia) Andrew Harris (Chinese Taipei) Yu Cheng-yu (Japan) Sora Fukuda (Japan) Kento Takeuchi
November 27	USA F39 Futures; Waco, United States; Hard (indoor) $25,000; Singles and doubles draws	(United Kingdom) Alexander Ward; 6–1, 6–1	(United States) Danny Thomas	(United States) Ryan Shane (United States) Trevor Allen Johnson	(Germany) Julian Lenz (United Kingdom) Edward Corrie (Brazil) Karue Sell (United States) Austin Krajicek
November 27	USA F39 Futures; Waco, United States; Hard (indoor) $25,000; Singles and doubles draws	(Germany) Julian Lenz (Venezuela) Roberto Maytín; 7–6^{(7–5)}, 1–6, [14–12]	(United States) Nathaniel Lammons (United States) Alex Lawson	(United States) Ryan Shane (United States) Trevor Allen Johnson	(Germany) Julian Lenz (United Kingdom) Edward Corrie (Brazil) Karue Sell (United States) Austin Krajicek
November 27	Argentina F11 Futures; Mendoza, Argentina; Clay $15,000; Singles and doubles draws	(Uruguay) Martín Cuevas; 6–4, 6–2	(Argentina) Hernán Casanova	(Argentina) Andrea Collarini (Argentina) Manuel Peña López	(Argentina) Gonzalo Villanueva (Argentina) Patricio Heras (Argentina) Juan Pablo Paz (Argentina) Federico Coria
November 27	Argentina F11 Futures; Mendoza, Argentina; Clay $15,000; Singles and doubles draws	(Argentina) Franco Agamenone (Argentina) Patricio Heras; 6–3, 6–2	(Argentina) Juan Ignacio Ameal (Argentina) Santiago Besada	(Argentina) Andrea Collarini (Argentina) Manuel Peña López	(Argentina) Gonzalo Villanueva (Argentina) Patricio Heras (Argentina) Juan Pablo Paz (Argentina) Federico Coria
November 27	Brazil F4 Futures; São Carlos, Brazil; Clay $15,000; Singles and doubles draws	(Sweden) Christian Lindell; 7–6^{(12–10)}, 7–6^{(9–7)}	(Brazil) João Souza	(Brazil) Daniel Dutra da Silva (Brazil) Oscar José Gutierrez	(Brazil) Rafael Matos (Brazil) Nicolas Santos (Brazil) José Pereira (Brazil) Orlando Luz
November 27	Brazil F4 Futures; São Carlos, Brazil; Clay $15,000; Singles and doubles draws	(Brazil) Caio Silva (Brazil) Thales Turini; 6–3, 6–1	(Sweden) Christian Lindell (Brazil) Carlos Eduardo Severino	(Brazil) Daniel Dutra da Silva (Brazil) Oscar José Gutierrez	(Brazil) Rafael Matos (Brazil) Nicolas Santos (Brazil) José Pereira (Brazil) Orlando Luz
November 27	Chile F2 Futures; Talca, Chile; Clay $15,000; Singles and doubles draws	(Chile) Juan Carlos Sáez; 6–4, 6–2	(Italy) Fabrizio Ornago	(Argentina) Eduardo Agustín Torre (Chile) Marcelo Tomás Barrios Vera	(Chile) Víctor Núñez (Chile) Bastián Malla (Argentina) Luciano Doria (Chile) Alejandro Tabilo
November 27	Chile F2 Futures; Talca, Chile; Clay $15,000; Singles and doubles draws	(Argentina) Mariano Kestelboim (Argentina) Matías Zukas; 7–6^{(7–5)}, 7–5	(Chile) Marcelo Tomás Barrios Vera (Chile) Juan Carlos Sáez	(Argentina) Eduardo Agustín Torre (Chile) Marcelo Tomás Barrios Vera	(Chile) Víctor Núñez (Chile) Bastián Malla (Argentina) Luciano Doria (Chile) Alejandro Tabilo
November 27	Czech Republic F11 Futures; Prague, Czech Republic; Hard (indoor) $15,000; Singles and doubles draws	(France) Constant Lestienne; 6–3, 6–3	(Czech Republic) Petr Michnev	(Germany) Louis Wessels (Germany) Rudolf Molleker	(Russia) Pavel Kotov (Czech Republic) Petr Nouza (Germany) Dominik Böhler (Czech Republic) Michael Vrbenský
November 27	Czech Republic F11 Futures; Prague, Czech Republic; Hard (indoor) $15,000; Singles and doubles draws	(Czech Republic) Marek Gengel (Czech Republic) Matěj Vocel; 6–4, 6–4	(Romania) Patrick Grigoriu (Austria) David Pichler	(Germany) Louis Wessels (Germany) Rudolf Molleker	(Russia) Pavel Kotov (Czech Republic) Petr Nouza (Germany) Dominik Böhler (Czech Republic) Michael Vrbenský
November 27	Dominican Republic F1 Futures; Santo Domingo Este, Dominican Republic; Hard $15,000; Singles and doubles draws	(Ecuador) Roberto Quiroz; 6–4, 6–4	(Dominican Republic) Roberto Cid Subervi	(Switzerland) Adrian Bodmer (Dominican Republic) José Hernández-Fernández	(Argentina) Genaro Alberto Olivieri (Netherlands) Sem Verbeek (United States) Vasil Kirkov (United States) Collin Johns
November 27	Dominican Republic F1 Futures; Santo Domingo Este, Dominican Republic; Hard $15,000; Singles and doubles draws	(Poland) Adrian Andrzejczuk (Norway) Viktor Durasovic; 3–6, 6–3, [10–4]	(Colombia) Alejandro Gómez (United States) John Lamble	(Switzerland) Adrian Bodmer (Dominican Republic) José Hernández-Fernández	(Argentina) Genaro Alberto Olivieri (Netherlands) Sem Verbeek (United States) Vasil Kirkov (United States) Collin Johns
November 27	Egypt F36 Futures; Cairo, Egypt; Clay $15,000; Singles and doubles draws	(Spain) Enrique López Pérez; 6–4, 6–3	(Spain) Mario Vilella Martínez	(Argentina) Dante Gennaro (Egypt) Youssef Hossam	(Egypt) Karim-Mohamed Maamoun (Ukraine) Olexiy Kolisnyk (Croatia) Neven Krivokuća (Austria) Thomas Statzberger
November 27	Egypt F36 Futures; Cairo, Egypt; Clay $15,000; Singles and doubles draws	(Brazil) Jordan Correia (Spain) Mario Vilella Martínez; 7–6^{(13–11)}, 7–6^{(7–4)}	(Poland) Karol Drzewiecki (Poland) Szymon Walków	(Argentina) Dante Gennaro (Egypt) Youssef Hossam	(Egypt) Karim-Mohamed Maamoun (Ukraine) Olexiy Kolisnyk (Croatia) Neven Krivokuća (Austria) Thomas Statzberger
November 27	Israel F16 Futures; Ramat HaSharon, Israel; Hard $15,000; Singles and doubles draws	(Belgium) Yannick Mertens; 7–6^{(7–4)}, 6–3	(Israel) Edan Leshem	(Netherlands) Scott Griekspoor (Italy) Matteo Viola	(Israel) Ben Patael (Israel) Mor Bulis (Belgium) Maxime Pauwels (Israel) Alon Elia
November 27	Israel F16 Futures; Ramat HaSharon, Israel; Hard $15,000; Singles and doubles draws	(France) Constantin Bittoun Kouzmine (United Kingdom) Barnaby Smith; 6–4, 4–6, [10–3]	(Russia) Vladimir Polyakov (Ukraine) Volodymyr Uzhylovskyi	(Netherlands) Scott Griekspoor (Italy) Matteo Viola	(Israel) Ben Patael (Israel) Mor Bulis (Belgium) Maxime Pauwels (Israel) Alon Elia
November 27	Mexico F7 Futures; Metepec, Mexico; Hard $15,000; Singles and doubles draws	(Switzerland) Marc-Andrea Hüsler; 6–3, 6–4	(Ecuador) Gonzalo Escobar	(Mexico) Tigre Hank (United States) Thai-Son Kwiatkowski	(United States) Adam El Mihdawy (Mexico) Manuel Sánchez (United States) Ronnie Schneider (Monaco) Lucas Catarina
November 27	Mexico F7 Futures; Metepec, Mexico; Hard $15,000; Singles and doubles draws	(Ecuador) Gonzalo Escobar (Mexico) Manuel Sánchez; 6–3, 6–3	(United States) John Paul Fruttero (United States) Thai-Son Kwiatkowski	(Mexico) Tigre Hank (United States) Thai-Son Kwiatkowski	(United States) Adam El Mihdawy (Mexico) Manuel Sánchez (United States) Ronnie Schneider (Monaco) Lucas Catarina
November 27	South Africa F2 Futures; Stellenbosch, South Africa; Hard $15,000; Singles and doubles draws	(France) Lény Mitjana; 6–2, 6–4	(Zimbabwe) Takanyi Garanganga	(South Africa) Nicolaas Scholtz (Zimbabwe) Benjamin Lock	(South Africa) Tucker Vorster (Poland) Paweł Ciaś (Netherlands) Michiel de Krom (Germany) George von Massow
November 27	South Africa F2 Futures; Stellenbosch, South Africa; Hard $15,000; Singles and doubles draws	(United States) Robert Galloway (Zimbabwe) Benjamin Lock; 6–3, 6–3	(Netherlands) Michiel de Krom (Netherlands) Ryan Nijboer	(South Africa) Nicolaas Scholtz (Zimbabwe) Benjamin Lock	(South Africa) Tucker Vorster (Poland) Paweł Ciaś (Netherlands) Michiel de Krom (Germany) George von Massow
November 27	Thailand F10 Futures; Hua Hin, Thailand; Hard $15,000; Singles and doubles draws	(Russia) Alexey Vatutin; 6–4, 6–4	(New Zealand) Rubin Statham	(Netherlands) Miliaan Niesten (Denmark) Frederik Nielsen	(Latvia) Mārtiņš Podžus (Ukraine) Yurii Dzhavakian (Kyrgyzstan) Daniiar Duldaev (Germany) Tobias Simon
November 27	Thailand F10 Futures; Hua Hin, Thailand; Hard $15,000; Singles and doubles draws	(Germany) Pascal Meis (Germany) Tobias Simon; 7–5, 7–5	(Kyrgyzstan) Daniiar Duldaev (Russia) Yan Sabanin	(Netherlands) Miliaan Niesten (Denmark) Frederik Nielsen	(Latvia) Mārtiņš Podžus (Ukraine) Yurii Dzhavakian (Kyrgyzstan) Daniiar Duldaev (Germany) Tobias Simon
November 27	Tunisia F37 Futures; Hammamet, Tunisia; Clay $15,000; Singles and doubles draws	(Portugal) Gonçalo Oliveira; 6–3, 6–2	(Italy) Raúl Brancaccio	(Spain) Oriol Roca Batalla (Croatia) Nino Serdarušić	(Italy) Cristian Carli (Spain) Marc Fornell Mestres (Portugal) Fred Gil (Ecuador) Diego Hidalgo
November 27	Tunisia F37 Futures; Hammamet, Tunisia; Clay $15,000; Singles and doubles draws	(Tunisia) Anis Ghorbel (Spain) Oriol Roca Batalla; 6–3, 6–4	(Italy) Raúl Brancaccio (Spain) Sergio Martos Gornés	(Spain) Oriol Roca Batalla (Croatia) Nino Serdarušić	(Italy) Cristian Carli (Spain) Marc Fornell Mestres (Portugal) Fred Gil (Ecuador) Diego Hidalgo
November 27	Turkey F45 Futures; Antalya, Turkey; Clay $15,000; Singles and doubles draws	(Austria) Lenny Hampel; 7–5, 4–6, 6–3	(Turkey) Cem İlkel	(Spain) Albert Alcaraz Ivorra (Germany) Peter Torebko	(Japan) Makoto Ochi (Germany) Nico Mertens (Russia) Ivan Gakhov (France) François-Arthur Vibert
November 27	Turkey F45 Futures; Antalya, Turkey; Clay $15,000; Singles and doubles draws	(Serbia) Nikola Ćaćić (Switzerland) Luca Margaroli; 7–5, 6–2	(Turkey) Gökberk Ergeneman (Uzbekistan) Khumoyun Sultanov	(Spain) Albert Alcaraz Ivorra (Germany) Peter Torebko	(Japan) Makoto Ochi (Germany) Nico Mertens (Russia) Ivan Gakhov (France) François-Arthur Vibert

=== December ===
Week of	Tournament	Winner	Runners-up	Semifinalists	Quarterfinalists
December 4	USA F40 Futures; Tallahassee, United States; Hard (indoor) $25,000; Singles and doubles draws	(United States) Ryan Shane; 7–6^{(7–3)}, 6–1	(Japan) Kaichi Uchida	(United States) Jacob Dunbar (United States) Ulises Blanch	(United States) Dennis Nevolo (United States) Josh Hagar (United Kingdom) Alexander Ward (Germany) Mats Moraing
December 4	USA F40 Futures; Tallahassee, United States; Hard (indoor) $25,000; Singles and doubles draws	(United States) Nathaniel Lammons (United States) Alex Lawson; 6–3, 6–0	(United States) Jose Gracia (France) Lucas Poullain	(United States) Jacob Dunbar (United States) Ulises Blanch	(United States) Dennis Nevolo (United States) Josh Hagar (United Kingdom) Alexander Ward (Germany) Mats Moraing
December 4	Argentina F12 Futures; San Juan, Argentina; Clay $15,000; Singles and doubles draws	(Uruguay) Martín Cuevas; 6–3, 6–7^{(2–7)}, 6–4	(Argentina) Juan Ignacio Galarza	(Argentina) Federico Coria (Sweden) Christian Lindell	(Argentina) Patricio Heras (Argentina) Santiago Rodríguez Taverna (Brazil) Daniel Dutra da Silva (Argentina) Federico Moreno
December 4	Argentina F12 Futures; San Juan, Argentina; Clay $15,000; Singles and doubles draws	(Argentina) Franco Agamenone (Argentina) Patricio Heras; 6–3, 4–6, [10–8]	(Brazil) Daniel Dutra da Silva (Brazil) Augusto Laranja	(Argentina) Federico Coria (Sweden) Christian Lindell	(Argentina) Patricio Heras (Argentina) Santiago Rodríguez Taverna (Brazil) Daniel Dutra da Silva (Argentina) Federico Moreno
December 4	Chile F3 Futures; Antofagasta, Chile; Clay $15,000; Singles and doubles draws	(Chile) Marcelo Tomás Barrios Vera; 5–7, 7–6^{(7–5)}, 6–2	(Chile) Alejandro Tabilo	(Argentina) Nicolás Alberto Arreche (Argentina) Mariano Kestelboim	(Argentina) Matías Zukas (Chile) Bastián Malla (Argentina) Eduardo Agustín Torre (Brazil) Orlando Luz
December 4	Chile F3 Futures; Antofagasta, Chile; Clay $15,000; Singles and doubles draws	(Argentina) Franco Emanuel Egea (Argentina) Gabriel Alejandro Hidalgo; 4–6, 6–3, [10–8]	(Argentina) Mariano Kestelboim (Argentina) Matías Zukas	(Argentina) Nicolás Alberto Arreche (Argentina) Mariano Kestelboim	(Argentina) Matías Zukas (Chile) Bastián Malla (Argentina) Eduardo Agustín Torre (Brazil) Orlando Luz
December 4	Dominican Republic F2 Futures; Santo Domingo Este, Dominican Republic; Hard $15,000; Singles and doubles draws	(Dominican Republic) Roberto Cid Subervi; 6–3, 6–2	(Dominican Republic) José Hernández-Fernández	(Spain) Carlos Boluda-Purkiss (Ecuador) Emilio Gómez	(Colombia) Alejandro Gómez (United States) Lukas Greif (Netherlands) Sem Verbeek (Switzerland) Adrian Bodmer
December 4	Dominican Republic F2 Futures; Santo Domingo Este, Dominican Republic; Hard $15,000; Singles and doubles draws	(Portugal) Bernardo Saraiva (Netherlands) Sem Verbeek; 7–5, 6–4	(Switzerland) Adrian Bodmer (Austria) Matthias Haim	(Spain) Carlos Boluda-Purkiss (Ecuador) Emilio Gómez	(Colombia) Alejandro Gómez (United States) Lukas Greif (Netherlands) Sem Verbeek (Switzerland) Adrian Bodmer
December 4	Egypt F37 Futures; Cairo, Egypt; Clay $15,000; Singles and doubles draws	(Spain) Enrique López Pérez; 6–4, 6–2	(Spain) Mario Vilella Martínez	(Egypt) Karim-Mohamed Maamoun (Egypt) Youssef Hossam	(Russia) Ronald Slobodchikov (Italy) Alexander Weis (Brazil) Jordan Correia (Austria) Thomas Statzberger
December 4	Egypt F37 Futures; Cairo, Egypt; Clay $15,000; Singles and doubles draws	(India) Aryan Goveas (India) Arjun Kadhe; 7–5, 6–3	(Spain) Adrián Expósito (Brazil) Diego Matos	(Egypt) Karim-Mohamed Maamoun (Egypt) Youssef Hossam	(Russia) Ronald Slobodchikov (Italy) Alexander Weis (Brazil) Jordan Correia (Austria) Thomas Statzberger
December 4	Israel F17 Futures; Tiberias, Israel; Hard $15,000; Singles and doubles draws	(Netherlands) Scott Griekspoor; 6–2, 6–2	(Israel) Igor Smilansky	(Belgium) Maxime Pauwels (Israel) Edan Leshem	(France) Antoine Cornut-Chauvinc (France) Damien Bayard (Switzerland) Aaron Schmid (Israel) Yasha Zemel
December 4	Israel F17 Futures; Tiberias, Israel; Hard $15,000; Singles and doubles draws	(Germany) Christian Hirschmüller (Ukraine) Volodymyr Uzhylovskyi; 6–3, 6–4	(Japan) Yuichi Ito (Ukraine) Vladyslav Orlov	(Belgium) Maxime Pauwels (Israel) Edan Leshem	(France) Antoine Cornut-Chauvinc (France) Damien Bayard (Switzerland) Aaron Schmid (Israel) Yasha Zemel
December 4	Mexico F8 Futures; Cancún, Mexico; Hard $15,000; Singles and doubles draws	(Monaco) Lucas Catarina; 6–4, 7–6^{(7–2)}	(Ecuador) Gonzalo Escobar	(Bolivia) Federico Zeballos (United States) Evan Song	(Brazil) Bruno Sant'Anna (Mexico) Luis Patiño (Mexico) Manuel Sánchez (Bolivia) Boris Arias
December 4	Mexico F8 Futures; Cancún, Mexico; Hard $15,000; Singles and doubles draws	(Ecuador) Gonzalo Escobar (Brazil) Bruno Sant'Anna; 1–6, 6–3, [10–4]	(Bolivia) Boris Arias (Bolivia) Federico Zeballos	(Bolivia) Federico Zeballos (United States) Evan Song	(Brazil) Bruno Sant'Anna (Mexico) Luis Patiño (Mexico) Manuel Sánchez (Bolivia) Boris Arias
December 4	Pakistan F1 Futures; Islamabad, Pakistan; Clay $15,000; Singles and doubles draws	(Russia) Ivan Nedelko; 6–3, 6–4	(Spain) Pere Riba	(Russia) Kristian Lozan (Russia) Shalva Dzhanashia	(Austria) Peter Goldsteiner (Ukraine) Alexander Lebedyn (Pakistan) Samir Iftikhar (Spain) David Pérez Sanz
December 4	Pakistan F1 Futures; Islamabad, Pakistan; Clay $15,000; Singles and doubles draws	(Pakistan) Aqeel Khan (Pakistan) Shahzad Khan; 7–6^{(7–3)}, 7–6^{(7–4)}	(France) Luka Pavlovic (Spain) Pere Riba	(Russia) Kristian Lozan (Russia) Shalva Dzhanashia	(Austria) Peter Goldsteiner (Ukraine) Alexander Lebedyn (Pakistan) Samir Iftikhar (Spain) David Pérez Sanz
December 4	Qatar F4 Futures; Doha, Qatar; Hard $15,000; Singles and doubles draws	(Spain) Roberto Ortega Olmedo; 4–6, 6–3, 6–1	(Sweden) Markus Eriksson	(France) Johan Tatlot (France) Maxime Hamou	(United Kingdom) Richard Gabb (France) Antoine Escoffier (United Kingdom) Tom Farquharson (Austria) Maximilian Neuchrist
December 4	Qatar F4 Futures; Doha, Qatar; Hard $15,000; Singles and doubles draws	(United Kingdom) Ryan Peniston (United Kingdom) Andrew Watson; 6–3, 7–6^{(7–4)}	(United Kingdom) Richard Gabb (United Kingdom) Luke Johnson	(France) Johan Tatlot (France) Maxime Hamou	(United Kingdom) Richard Gabb (France) Antoine Escoffier (United Kingdom) Tom Farquharson (Austria) Maximilian Neuchrist
December 4	South Africa F3 Futures; Stellenbosch, South Africa; Hard $15,000; Singles and doubles draws	(South Africa) Nicolaas Scholtz; 3–6, 6–1, 7–6^{(7–2)}	(France) Lény Mitjana	(Zimbabwe) Benjamin Lock (Australia) Thomas Fancutt	(Spain) Jaime Pulgar-García (Germany) George von Massow (Germany) Frederik Press (Poland) Paweł Ciaś
December 4	South Africa F3 Futures; Stellenbosch, South Africa; Hard $15,000; Singles and doubles draws	(United States) Robert Galloway (Zimbabwe) Benjamin Lock; 7–6^{(7–3)}, 6–7^{(4–7)}, [10–5]	(Spain) Jaime Pulgar-García (Spain) Javier Pulgar-García	(Zimbabwe) Benjamin Lock (Australia) Thomas Fancutt	(Spain) Jaime Pulgar-García (Germany) George von Massow (Germany) Frederik Press (Poland) Paweł Ciaś
December 4	Thailand F11 Futures; Hua Hin, Thailand; Hard $15,000; Singles and doubles draws	(Japan) Renta Tokuda; 6–2, 6–4	(Denmark) Frederik Nielsen	(South Korea) Kim Cheong-eui (France) Corentin Denolly	(Latvia) Mārtiņš Podžus (Thailand) Wishaya Trongcharoenchaikul (South Korea) Nam Ji-sung (China) Bai Yan
December 4	Thailand F11 Futures; Hua Hin, Thailand; Hard $15,000; Singles and doubles draws	(South Korea) Chung Hong (South Korea) Song Min-kyu; 6–4, 6–3	(United States) Nicholas Hu (Thailand) Wishaya Trongcharoenchaikul	(South Korea) Kim Cheong-eui (France) Corentin Denolly	(Latvia) Mārtiņš Podžus (Thailand) Wishaya Trongcharoenchaikul (South Korea) Nam Ji-sung (China) Bai Yan
December 4	Tunisia F38 Futures; Hammamet, Tunisia; Clay $15,000; Singles and doubles draws	(Portugal) Gonçalo Oliveira; 7–6^{(7–5)}, 3–6, 6–3	(Serbia) Dejan Katić	(Italy) Marco Bortolotti (Italy) Raúl Brancaccio	(Tunisia) Anis Ghorbel (Austria) Gibril Diarra (France) Samuel Bensoussan (France) Matthieu Perchicot
December 4	Tunisia F38 Futures; Hammamet, Tunisia; Clay $15,000; Singles and doubles draws	(Italy) Raúl Brancaccio (Spain) Andrés Fernández Cánovas; 7–6^{(7–4)}, 6–2	(France) Samuel Bensoussan (Tunisia) Anis Ghorbel	(Italy) Marco Bortolotti (Italy) Raúl Brancaccio	(Tunisia) Anis Ghorbel (Austria) Gibril Diarra (France) Samuel Bensoussan (France) Matthieu Perchicot
December 4	Turkey F46 Futures; Antalya, Turkey; Clay $15,000; Singles and doubles draws	(Bosnia and Herzegovina) Tomislav Brkić; 7–6^{(7–2)}, 2–6, 7–6^{(9–7)}	(Serbia) Nikola Ćaćić	(Russia) Ivan Gakhov (Turkey) Cem İlkel	(Italy) Luca Vanni (Spain) Albert Alcaraz Ivorra (Austria) Lenny Hampel (France) Tak Khunn Wang
December 4	Turkey F46 Futures; Antalya, Turkey; Clay $15,000; Singles and doubles draws	(Serbia) Nikola Ćaćić (Switzerland) Luca Margaroli; 6–3, 7–6^{(7–1)}	(Russia) Ivan Gakhov (Russia) Alexander Pavlioutchenkov	(Russia) Ivan Gakhov (Turkey) Cem İlkel	(Italy) Luca Vanni (Spain) Albert Alcaraz Ivorra (Austria) Lenny Hampel (France) Tak Khunn Wang
December 11	Dominican Republic F3 Futures; Santo Domingo Este, Dominican Republic; Hard $15,000; Singles and doubles draws	(Dominican Republic) José Hernández-Fernández; 6–0, 6–7^{(6–8)}, 6–2	(Colombia) Alejandro Gómez	(Spain) Carlos Boluda-Purkiss (Dominican Republic) José Olivares	(Netherlands) Sem Verbeek (Ecuador) Iván Endara (Dominican Republic) Roberto Cid Subervi (France) Mick Lescure
December 11	Dominican Republic F3 Futures; Santo Domingo Este, Dominican Republic; Hard $15,000; Singles and doubles draws	(Portugal) Bernardo Saraiva (Netherlands) Sem Verbeek; 6–3, 6–4	(Dominican Republic) Nick Hardt (Dominican Republic) José Olivares	(Spain) Carlos Boluda-Purkiss (Dominican Republic) José Olivares	(Netherlands) Sem Verbeek (Ecuador) Iván Endara (Dominican Republic) Roberto Cid Subervi (France) Mick Lescure
December 11	Egypt F38 Futures; Cairo, Egypt; Clay $15,000; Singles and doubles draws	(Spain) Mario Vilella Martínez; 6–4, 7–6^{(7–5)}	(Russia) Ronald Slobodchikov	(Brazil) Jordan Correia (Canada) Pavel Krainik	(Ukraine) Oleksandr Bielinskyi (Austria) Thomas Statzberger (Czech Republic) Dominik Bartoň (Republic of Ireland) Simon Carr
December 11	Egypt F38 Futures; Cairo, Egypt; Clay $15,000; Singles and doubles draws	(India) Aryan Goveas (India) Arjun Kadhe; 6–7^{(1–7)}, 6–1, [10–7]	(Ukraine) Oleksandr Bielinskyi (Russia) Ronald Slobodchikov	(Brazil) Jordan Correia (Canada) Pavel Krainik	(Ukraine) Oleksandr Bielinskyi (Austria) Thomas Statzberger (Czech Republic) Dominik Bartoň (Republic of Ireland) Simon Carr
December 11	Israel F18 Futures; Sajur, Israel; Hard $15,000; Singles and doubles draws	(Israel) Yshai Oliel; 7–6^{(8–6)}, 6–2	(France) Tom Jomby	(Israel) Alon Elia (Belgium) Maxime Pauwels	(Israel) Igor Smilansky (Russia) Dmitry Mnushkin (France) Antoine Walch (Israel) Mor Bulis
December 11	Israel F18 Futures; Sajur, Israel; Hard $15,000; Singles and doubles draws	(Israel) Shahar Elbaz (Ukraine) Volodymyr Uzhylovskyi; 6–4, 6–7^{(5–7)}, [10–7]	(Switzerland) Luca Castelnuovo (France) Antoine Walch	(Israel) Alon Elia (Belgium) Maxime Pauwels	(Israel) Igor Smilansky (Russia) Dmitry Mnushkin (France) Antoine Walch (Israel) Mor Bulis
December 11	Pakistan F2 Futures; Islamabad, Pakistan; Clay $15,000; Singles and doubles draws	(Spain) Enrique López Pérez; 7–6^{(7–1)}, 6–1	(Russia) Ivan Nedelko	(France) Luka Pavlovic (Russia) Shalva Dzhanashiya	(Germany) Julian Onken (Spain) Pere Riba (Russia) Kristian Lozan (Austria) Peter Goldsteiner
December 11	Pakistan F2 Futures; Islamabad, Pakistan; Clay $15,000; Singles and doubles draws	(Pakistan) Aqeel Khan (Pakistan) Shahzad Khan; 7–6^{(7–5)}, 3–6, [10–6]	(Russia) Anton Chekhov (Ukraine) Alexander Lebedyn	(France) Luka Pavlovic (Russia) Shalva Dzhanashiya	(Germany) Julian Onken (Spain) Pere Riba (Russia) Kristian Lozan (Austria) Peter Goldsteiner
December 11	Peru F1 Futures; Lima, Peru; Clay $15,000; Singles and doubles draws	(Colombia) Daniel Elahi Galán; 7–5, 6–3	(Peru) Nicolás Álvarez	(Brazil) Oscar José Gutierrez (Argentina) Matías Franco Descotte	(Peru) Mauricio Echazú (Chile) Marcelo Tomás Barrios Vera (Brazil) Daniel Dutra da Silva (Peru) Juan Pablo Varillas
December 11	Peru F1 Futures; Lima, Peru; Clay $15,000; Singles and doubles draws	(Colombia) Daniel Elahi Galán (Brazil) João Pedro Sorgi; 4–6, 6–4, [10–3]	(Bolivia) Boris Arias (Bolivia) Federico Zeballos	(Brazil) Oscar José Gutierrez (Argentina) Matías Franco Descotte	(Peru) Mauricio Echazú (Chile) Marcelo Tomás Barrios Vera (Brazil) Daniel Dutra da Silva (Peru) Juan Pablo Varillas
December 11	Qatar F5 Futures; Doha, Qatar; Hard $15,000; Singles and doubles draws	(Russia) Aslan Karatsev; 6–4, 6–0	(Germany) Benjamin Hassan	(France) Johan Tatlot (Uzbekistan) Jurabek Karimov	(Austria) Lucas Miedler (France) Jules Okala (Germany) George von Massow (Spain) Roberto Ortega Olmedo
December 11	Qatar F5 Futures; Doha, Qatar; Hard $15,000; Singles and doubles draws	(Turkey) Tuna Altuna (Sweden) Markus Eriksson; 6–1, 6–2	(Russia) Aslan Karatsev (Croatia) Fran Zvonimir Zgombić	(France) Johan Tatlot (Uzbekistan) Jurabek Karimov	(Austria) Lucas Miedler (France) Jules Okala (Germany) George von Massow (Spain) Roberto Ortega Olmedo
December 11	Thailand F12 Futures; Hua Hin, Thailand; Hard $15,000; Singles and doubles draws	(South Korea) Kim Cheong-eui; 4–6, 7–6^{(7–1)}, 4–3 ret.	(Japan) Renta Tokuda	(Australia) Jacob Grills (China) Bai Yan	(Russia) Alexey Vatutin (United Kingdom) Billy Harris (Chinese Taipei) Chen Ti (South Korea) Nam Ji-sung
December 11	Thailand F12 Futures; Hua Hin, Thailand; Hard $15,000; Singles and doubles draws	(South Korea) Chung Hong (South Korea) Song Min-kyu; 7–6^{(7–5)}, 3–6, [10–6]	(China) Gao Xin (China) Sun Fajing	(Australia) Jacob Grills (China) Bai Yan	(Russia) Alexey Vatutin (United Kingdom) Billy Harris (Chinese Taipei) Chen Ti (South Korea) Nam Ji-sung
December 11	Tunisia F39 Futures; Hammamet, Tunisia; Clay $15,000; Singles and doubles draws	(Serbia) Miljan Zekić; 4–1, ret.	(Portugal) Gonçalo Oliveira	(Italy) Raúl Brancaccio (Spain) Oriol Roca Batalla	(France) Manuel Guinard (France) Samuel Bensoussan (United Kingdom) Evan Hoyt (Italy) Marco Bortolotti
December 11	Tunisia F39 Futures; Hammamet, Tunisia; Clay $15,000; Singles and doubles draws	(Italy) Raúl Brancaccio (Portugal) Gonçalo Oliveira; 7–6^{(7–5)}, 6–2	(Italy) Marco Bortolotti (Spain) Oriol Roca Batalla	(Italy) Raúl Brancaccio (Spain) Oriol Roca Batalla	(France) Manuel Guinard (France) Samuel Bensoussan (United Kingdom) Evan Hoyt (Italy) Marco Bortolotti
December 11	Turkey F47 Futures; Antalya, Turkey; Clay $15,000; Singles and doubles draws	(France) Tak Khunn Wang; 6–2, 6–0	(Italy) Antonio Massara	(Romania) Vasile Antonescu (Colombia) Cristian Rodríguez	(Austria) Lenny Hampel (Serbia) Nikola Ćaćić (Germany) Julian Lenz (Argentina) Dante Gennaro
December 11	Turkey F47 Futures; Antalya, Turkey; Clay $15,000; Singles and doubles draws	(Colombia) Cristian Rodríguez (France) Tak Khunn Wang; 7–6^{(7–2)}, 6–2	(Argentina) Dante Gennaro (Ecuador) Diego Hidalgo	(Romania) Vasile Antonescu (Colombia) Cristian Rodríguez	(Austria) Lenny Hampel (Serbia) Nikola Ćaćić (Germany) Julian Lenz (Argentina) Dante Gennaro
December 18	Hong Kong F4 Futures; Hong Kong; Hard $15,000; Singles and doubles draws	(South Korea) Kim Cheong-eui; 6–3, 3–6, 7–5	(Germany) Daniel Altmaier	(China) Gao Xin (Japan) Shintaro Imai	(China) Wang Chuhan (Japan) Rio Noguchi (Chinese Taipei) Chen Ti (Chinese Taipei) Wu Tung-lin
December 18	Hong Kong F4 Futures; Hong Kong; Hard $15,000; Singles and doubles draws	(Chinese Taipei) Chen Ti (Portugal) Gonçalo Oliveira; 4–6, 7–5, [10–8]	(Japan) Shintaro Imai (South Korea) Kim Cheong-eui	(China) Gao Xin (Japan) Shintaro Imai	(China) Wang Chuhan (Japan) Rio Noguchi (Chinese Taipei) Chen Ti (Chinese Taipei) Wu Tung-lin
December 18	Pakistan F3 Futures; Islamabad, Pakistan; Clay $15,000; Singles and doubles draws	(Russia) Ivan Nedelko; 6–4, 7–6^{(7–4)}	(Spain) Enrique López Pérez	(Turkey) Ergi Kırkın (Austria) Peter Goldsteiner	(India) Kunal Anand (Russia) Anton Chekhov (Russia) Shalva Dzhanashiya (Germany) Julian Onken
December 18	Pakistan F3 Futures; Islamabad, Pakistan; Clay $15,000; Singles and doubles draws	(Spain) Enrique López Pérez (Russia) Kristian Lozan; 6–0, 6–2	(Ukraine) Gleb Alekseenko (Russia) Ivan Ponomarenko	(Turkey) Ergi Kırkın (Austria) Peter Goldsteiner	(India) Kunal Anand (Russia) Anton Chekhov (Russia) Shalva Dzhanashiya (Germany) Julian Onken
December 18	Peru F2 Futures; Lima, Peru; Clay $15,000; Singles and doubles draws	(Argentina) Matías Zukas; 6–4, 6–2	(Brazil) Oscar José Gutierrez	(United States) Junior Alexander Ore (Chile) Marcelo Tomás Barrios Vera	(Colombia) Daniel Elahi Galán (Argentina) Matías Franco Descotte (Peru) Juan Pablo Varillas (Peru) Duilio Beretta
December 18	Peru F2 Futures; Lima, Peru; Clay $15,000; Singles and doubles draws	(United States) Junior Alexander Ore (Peru) Jorge Panta; 6–1, 7–5	(Bolivia) Boris Arias (Bolivia) Federico Zeballos	(United States) Junior Alexander Ore (Chile) Marcelo Tomás Barrios Vera	(Colombia) Daniel Elahi Galán (Argentina) Matías Franco Descotte (Peru) Juan Pablo Varillas (Peru) Duilio Beretta
December 18	Qatar F6 Futures; Doha, Qatar; Hard $15,000; Singles and doubles draws	(Russia) Alexey Vatutin; 6–1, 7–5	(Germany) Benjamin Hassan	(Netherlands) Guy den Heijer (France) Antoine Escoffier	(United Kingdom) Luke Johnson (Russia) Aslan Karatsev (Netherlands) Tim van Rijthoven (France) Ugo Humbert
December 18	Qatar F6 Futures; Doha, Qatar; Hard $15,000; Singles and doubles draws	(France) Quentin Folliot (France) Victor Ouvrard; 7–6^{(7–5)}, 6–7^{(2–7)}, [10–5]	(Sweden) Markus Eriksson (Sweden) Sam Taylor	(Netherlands) Guy den Heijer (France) Antoine Escoffier	(United Kingdom) Luke Johnson (Russia) Aslan Karatsev (Netherlands) Tim van Rijthoven (France) Ugo Humbert
December 18	Tunisia F40 Futures; Hammamet, Tunisia; Clay $15,000; Singles and doubles draws	(Serbia) Miljan Zekić; 6–3, 6–2	(Tunisia) Aziz Dougaz	(France) Samuel Bensoussan (Spain) Oriol Roca Batalla	(France) Manuel Guinard (France) Laurent Rochette (Italy) Marco Bortolotti (France) Jonathan Kanar
December 18	Tunisia F40 Futures; Hammamet, Tunisia; Clay $15,000; Singles and doubles draws	(France) Manuel Guinard (France) Clément Tabur; 6–7^{(6–8)}, 6–2, [13–11]	(France) Samuel Bensoussan (France) François-Arthur Vibert	(France) Samuel Bensoussan (Spain) Oriol Roca Batalla	(France) Manuel Guinard (France) Laurent Rochette (Italy) Marco Bortolotti (France) Jonathan Kanar
December 18	Turkey F48 Futures; Antalya, Turkey; Clay $15,000; Singles and doubles draws	(Colombia) Cristian Rodríguez; 6–2, 6–2	(Argentina) Dante Gennaro	(Ukraine) Oleg Prihodko (Austria) Alexander Erler	(Ukraine) Vladyslav Orlov (Netherlands) Colin van Beem (Poland) Adam Chadaj (Poland) Maciej Smoła
December 18	Turkey F48 Futures; Antalya, Turkey; Clay $15,000; Singles and doubles draws	(Netherlands) Glenn Smits (Netherlands) Colin van Beem; 7–6^{(7–2)}, 6–2	(Ukraine) Vladyslav Orlov (Georgia (country)) George Tsivadze	(Ukraine) Oleg Prihodko (Austria) Alexander Erler	(Ukraine) Vladyslav Orlov (Netherlands) Colin van Beem (Poland) Adam Chadaj (Poland) Maciej Smoła
December 25	Hong Kong F5 Futures; Hong Kong; Hard $15,000; Singles and doubles draws	(France) Corentin Denolly; 7–6^{(7–5)}, 6–7^{(3–7)}, 6–3	(Russia) Alexander Zhurbin	(Japan) Shintaro Imai (China) Bai Yan	(United States) Nicholas Hu (United States) Jack Murray (Chinese Taipei) Wu Tung-lin (Japan) Takashi Saito
December 25	Hong Kong F5 Futures; Hong Kong; Hard $15,000; Singles and doubles draws	(United States) Evan King (United States) Michael Zhu; 6–4, 6–2	(France) Corentin Denolly (Japan) Takuto Niki	(Japan) Shintaro Imai (China) Bai Yan	(United States) Nicholas Hu (United States) Jack Murray (Chinese Taipei) Wu Tung-lin (Japan) Takashi Saito
