= 2011 Davis Cup Asia/Oceania Zone Group IV =

Zone of the Davis Cup competition in 2011

The Asia/Oceania Zone is one of the three zones of regional Davis Cup competition in 2011.

In the Asia/Oceania Zone there are four different groups in which teams compete against each other to advance to the next group.

Bangladesh and Kyrgyzstan were promoted.

== Format ==
The eight teams were split in two groups and played in a round-robin format. The group winners played the runners-up from the other group, and the winning teams were promoted to the Asia/Oceania Zone Group III in 2012.

It was played on 13–16 April 2011 at the National Tennis Complex in Dhaka, Bangladesh.

== Group stage ==
=== Group A ===
Team	Pld	W	L	MF	MA	Pts
Kyrgyzstan	3	3	0	6	3	3
Jordan	3	2	1	6	3	2
Bahrain	3	1	2	3	6	1
Qatar	3	0	3	3	6	0

==== Jordan vs. Qatar ====
Jordan
2
National Tennis Complex, Dhaka, Bangladesh
13 April 2011
hard (outdoor)

Qatar
1

			1	2	3
1	(Jordan) (Qatar)	Ahmed Ibrahim Ahmad Alhadid; Mousa Shanan Zayed	6; 3	6; 1
2	(Jordan) (Qatar)	Mohammad Al-Aisowi; Jabor Mohammed Ali Mutawa	3; 6	1; 6
3	(Jordan) (Qatar)	Ahmed Ibrahim Ahmad Alhadid / Fawaz El Hourani; Jabor Mohammed Ali Mutawa / Mousa Shanan Zayed	7; 5	6; 4

==== Bahrain vs. Kyrgyzstan ====
Bahrain
1
National Tennis Complex, Dhaka, Bangladesh
13 April 2011
hard (outdoor)

Kyrgyzstan
2

			1	2	3
1	(Bahrain) (Kyrgyzstan)	Hasan Abdul-Nabi; Denis Surotin	3; 6	6; 3	6; 4
2	(Bahrain) (Kyrgyzstan)	Khaled Al Thawadi; Daniiar Duldaev	2; 6	0; 6
3	(Bahrain) (Kyrgyzstan)	Hasan Abdul-Nabi / Khaled Al Thawadi; Daniiar Duldaev / Denis Surotin	1; 6	6; 7

==== Jordan vs. Kyrgyzstan ====
Jordan
1
National Tennis Complex, Dhaka, Bangladesh
14 April 2011
hard (outdoor)

Kyrgyzstan
2

			1	2	3
1	(Jordan) (Kyrgyzstan)	Ahmed Ibrahim Ahmad Alhadid; Evgeniy Babak	6; 3	6; 2
2	(Jordan) (Kyrgyzstan)	Mohammad Al-Aisowi; Daniiar Duldaev	2; 6	5; 7
3	(Jordan) (Kyrgyzstan)	Ahmed Ibrahim Ahmad Alhadid / Fawaz El Hourani; Daniiar Duldaev / Denis Surotin	2; 6	5; 7

==== Bahrain vs. Qatar ====
Bahrain
2
National Tennis Complex, Dhaka, Bangladesh
14 April 2011
hard (outdoor)

Qatar
1

			1	2	3
1	(Bahrain) (Qatar)	Hasan Abdul-Nabi; Mousa Shanan Zayed	5; 7	2; 6
2	(Bahrain) (Qatar)	Khaled Al Thawadi; Jabor Mohammed Ali Mutawa	6; 7	6; 1	6; 1
3	(Bahrain) (Qatar)	Hasan Abdul-Nabi / Khaled Al Thawadi; Mubarak Zaid / Mousa Shanan Zayed	6; 3	6; 4

==== Jordan vs. Bahrain ====
Jordan
3
National Tennis Complex, Dhaka, Bangladesh
15 April 2011
hard (outdoor)

Bahrain
0

			1	2	3
1	(Jordan) (Bahrain)	Fawaz El Hourani; Hasan Abdul-Nabi	4; 6	6; 2	6; 0
2	(Jordan) (Bahrain)	Mohammad Al-Aisowi; Khaled Al Thawadi	6; 2	6; 1
3	(Jordan) (Bahrain)	Ahmed Ibrahim Ahmad Alhadid / Fawaz El Hourani; Sayed Hazem Almoosawi / Yusuf Ebrahim Ahmed Abdulla Qaed	6; 0	6; 4

==== Qatar vs. Kyrgyzstan ====
Qatar
1
National Tennis Complex, Dhaka, Bangladesh
15 April 2011
hard (outdoor)

Kyrgyzstan
2

			1	2	3
1	(Qatar) (Kyrgyzstan)	Mousa Shanan Zayed; Evgeniy Babak	6; 4	2; 0		retired
2	(Qatar) (Kyrgyzstan)	Jabor Mohammed Ali Mutawa; Daniiar Duldaev	1; 6	1; 6
3	(Qatar) (Kyrgyzstan)	Jabor Mohammed Ali Mutawa / Mubarak Zaid; Daniiar Duldaev / Denis Surotin	6; 7	3; 6

=== Group B ===
Team	Pld	W	L	MF	MA	Pts
Bangladesh	3	3	0	8	1	3
Iraq	3	2	1	4	5	2
Singapore	3	1	2	4	5	1
Turkmenistan	3	0	3	2	7	0

==== Bangladesh vs. Turkmenistan ====
Bangladesh
3
National Tennis Complex, Dhaka, Bangladesh
13 April 2011
hard (outdoor)

Turkmenistan
0

			1	2	3
1	(Bangladesh) (Turkmenistan)	Sree-Amol Roy; Eziz Davletov	7; 6	4; 6	6; 3
2	(Bangladesh) (Turkmenistan)	Shibu Lal; Jamshid Ilmuradov	6; 4	6; 3
3	(Bangladesh) (Turkmenistan)	Mohammed-Alamgir Hossain / Ranjan Ram; Bahtiyar Atabaev / Jamshid Ilmuradov	6; 7	6; 0	6; 1

==== Singapore vs. Iraq ====
Singapore
1
National Tennis Complex, Dhaka, Bangladesh
13 April 2011
hard (outdoor)

Iraq
2

			1	2	3
1	(Singapore) (Iraq)	Sean Lee; Ali Khairi Hashim Al Mayahi	1; 6	1; 6
2	(Singapore) (Iraq)	Roy Hobbs; Akram Abdalkarem Al-Saady	3; 6	6; 4	4; 6
3	(Singapore) (Iraq)	Roy Hobbs / Sean Lee; Ali Khairi Hashim Al Mayahi / Maab Abdulrazaq Yaseen	6; 2	6; 7	6; 2

==== Bangladesh vs. Iraq ====
Bangladesh
3
National Tennis Complex, Dhaka, Bangladesh
14 April 2011
hard (outdoor)

Iraq
0

			1	2	3
1	(Bangladesh) (Iraq)	Sree-Amol Roy; Maab Abdulrazaq Yaseen	6; 0	6; 0
2	(Bangladesh) (Iraq)	Shibu Lal; Ahmed Hamzah Abdulhasan	6; 2	6; 0
3	(Bangladesh) (Iraq)	Mohammed-Alamgir Hossain / Ranjan Ram; Ali Khairi Hashim Al Mayahi / Akram Abdalkarem Al-Saady	6; 0	3; 6	6; 4

==== Singapore vs. Turkmenistan ====
Singapore
2
National Tennis Complex, Dhaka, Bangladesh
14 April 2011
hard (outdoor)

Turkmenistan
1

			1	2	3
1	(Singapore) (Turkmenistan)	Kunal Pawa; Eziz Davletov	7; 5	2; 6	2; 6
2	(Singapore) (Turkmenistan)	Roy Hobbs; Jamshid Ilmuradov	6; 3	6; 1
3	(Singapore) (Turkmenistan)	Daniel Heryanta Dewandaka / Roy Hobbs; Eziz Davletov / Jamshid Ilmuradov	6; 1	6; 3

==== Turkmenistan vs. Iraq ====
Turkmenistan
1
National Tennis Complex, Dhaka, Bangladesh
15 April 2011
hard (outdoor)

Iraq
2

			1	2	3
1	(Turkmenistan) (Iraq)	Bahtiyar Atabaev; Ali Khairi Hashim Al Mayahi	6; 0	3; 6	3; 6
2	(Turkmenistan) (Iraq)	Eziz Davletov; Akram Abdalkarem Al-Saady	6; 3	5; 7	4; 8
3	(Turkmenistan) (Iraq)	Rustam Bayramov / Jamshid Ilmuradov; Ahmed Hamzah Abdulhasan / Maab Abdulrazaq Yaseen	6; 4	6; 2

==== Bangladesh vs. Singapore ====
Bangladesh
2
National Tennis Complex, Dhaka, Bangladesh
15 April 2011
hard (outdoor)

Singapore
1

			1	2	3
1	(Bangladesh) (Singapore)	Sree-Amol Roy; Sean Lee	6; 1	6; 2
2	(Bangladesh) (Singapore)	Shibu Lal; Roy Hobbs	6; 4	4; 3		defaulted
3	(Bangladesh) (Singapore)	Mohammed-Alamgir Hossain / Ranjan Ram; Daniel Heryanta Dewandaka / Kunal Pawa	2; 6	3; 6

== Playoffs ==
=== 5th to 8th playoffs ===
==== Singapore vs. Bahrain ====
Singapore
2
National Tennis Complex, Dhaka, Bangladesh
16 April 2011
hard (outdoor)

Bahrain
1

			1	2	3
1	(Singapore) (Bahrain)	Kunal Pawa; Sayed Hazem Almoosawi	3; 6	3; 0		retired
2	(Singapore) (Bahrain)	Roy Hobbs; Yusuf Ebrahim Ahmed Abdulla Qaed	6; 1	6; 1
3	(Singapore) (Bahrain)	Roy Hobbs / Sean Lee; Sayed Hazem Almoosawi / Yusuf Ebrahim Ahmed Abdulla Qaed	2; 6	6; 1	6; 1

==== Turkmenistan vs. Qatar ====
Turkmenistan
0
National Tennis Complex, Dhaka, Bangladesh
16 April 2011
hard (outdoor)

Qatar
2

			1	2	3
1	(Turkmenistan) (Qatar)	Eziz Davletov; Mousa Shanan Zayed	1; 2			retired
2	(Turkmenistan) (Qatar)	Jamshid Ilmuradov; Jabor Mohammed Ali Mutawa	0; 1			retired
3	(Turkmenistan) (Qatar)	Eziz Davletov / Jamshid Ilmuradov; Jabor Mohammed Ali Mutawa / Mubarak Zaid				not played

=== Promotion playoffs ===
==== Bangladesh vs. Jordan ====
Bangladesh
2
National Tennis Complex, Dhaka, Bangladesh
16 April 2011
hard (outdoor)

Jordan
1

			1	2	3
1	(Bangladesh) (Jordan)	Sree-Amol Roy; Ahmed Ibrahim Ahmad Alhadid	6; 4	5; 7	6; 2
2	(Bangladesh) (Jordan)	Shibu Lal; Mohammad Al-Aisowi	6; 7	4; 6
3	(Bangladesh) (Jordan)	Ranjan Ram / Sree-Amol Roy; Mohammad Al-Aisowi / Fawaz El Hourani	6; 1	6; 2

==== Kyrgyzstan vs. Iraq ====
Kyrgyzstan
2
National Tennis Complex, Dhaka, Bangladesh
16 April 2011
hard (outdoor)

Iraq
1

			1	2	3
1	(Kyrgyzstan) (Iraq)	Denis Surotin; Ali Khairi Hashim Al Mayahi	3; 6	5; 7
2	(Kyrgyzstan) (Iraq)	Daniiar Duldaev; Akram Abdalkarem Al-Saady	6; 2	6; 2
3	(Kyrgyzstan) (Iraq)	Daniiar Duldaev / Denis Surotin; Ali Khairi Hashim Al Mayahi / Akram Abdalkarem Al-Saady	6; 2	6; 1

== Final standings ==
Rank	Team
1	Bangladesh
2	Kyrgyzstan
3	Jordan
4	Iraq
5	Singapore
6	Bahrain
7	Qatar
8	Turkmenistan

- Bangladesh and Kyrgyzstan promoted to Group III in 2012.
