= Daniiar Duldaev =

Kyrgyzstani tennis player

- Country (sports): Kyrgyzstan
- Residence: Bishkek, Kyrgyzstan
- Born: 27 October 1992 (age 32) Bishkek, Kyrgyzstan
- Height: 1.83 m (6 ft 0 in)
- Plays: Right-handed (two-handed backhand)
- Prize money: $40,753

Singles
- Career record: 0–0 (at ATP Tour level, Grand Slam level)
- Career titles: 0 Challenger, 1 Futures
- Highest ranking: No. 607 (14 July 2014)

Doubles
- Career record: 0–0 (at ATP Tour level, Grand Slam level)
- Career titles: 0 Challenger, 2 Futures
- Highest ranking: No. 484 (12 May 2014)
- Last updated on: 27 May 2019.

Daniiar Martovich Duldaev (Kyrgyz: Данияр Маратович Дулдаев, born 27 October 1992) is a Kyrgyzstani former tennis player.

Duldaev had a career high ATP singles ranking of world No. 607 achieved on 14 July 2014. He also has a career high doubles ranking of No. 484 achieved on 12 May 2014.

Duldaev represented Kyrgyzstan at the Davis Cup where he has a W/L record of 8–0.

== Future and Challenger finals ==
=== Singles: 3 (1–2) ===
Legend
Challengers 0 (0–0)
Futures 3 (1–2)

| Outcome | No. | Date | Tournament | Surface | Opponent | Score |
|---|---|---|---|---|---|---|
| Winner | 1. | July 27, 2013 | Istanbul, Turkey F29 | Hard | (Turkey) Tuna Altuna | 1–6, 7–6^{(7–5)}, 6–4 |
| Runner-up | 2. | October 26, 2013 | Shymkent, Kazakhstan F8 | Hard | (Russia) Stanislav Vovk | 0–6, 1–6 |
| Runner-up | 3. | November 12, 2017 | Thủ Dầu Một, Vietnam F1 | Hard | (France) Enzo Couacaud | 1–6, 1–6 |

=== Doubles 7 (2–5) ===
Legend
Challengers 0 (0–0)
Futures 7 (2–5)

| Outcome | No. | Date | Tournament | Surface | Partner | Opponents | Score |
|---|---|---|---|---|---|---|---|
| Runner-up | 1. | April 21, 2012 | Namangan, Uzbekistan F1 | Hard | (Russia) Fedor Chervyakov | (Ukraine) Vladyslav Manafov (Belarus) Yaraslav Shyla | 3–6, 6–4, [4–10] |
| Winner | 2. | August 24, 2013 | İzmir, Turkey F33 | Hard | (Zimbabwe) Mark Fynn | (France) Melik Feler (Peru) Alexander Merino | 4–6, 6–4, [10–6] |
| Runner-up | 3. | November 23, 2013 | Bhopal, India F10 | Hard | (India) Karunuday Singh | (India) Jeevan Nedunchezhiyan (India) Purav Raja | 3–6, 3–6 |
| Runner-up | 4. | May 3, 2014 | Andijan, Uzbekistan F3 | Hard | (Ukraine) Volodymyr Uzhylovskyi | (Russia) Denis Matsukevich (Ukraine) Denys Molchanov | 5–7, 5–7 |
| Winner | 5. | August 5, 2017 | Kazan, Russia F5 | Hard | (Kazakhstan) Denis Yevseyev | (Russia) Markos Kalovelonis (Russia) Alexander Pavlioutchenkov | 7–6^{(7–2)}, 6–4 |
| Runner-up | 6. | November 19, 2017 | Thủ Dầu Một, Vietnam F2 | Hard | (Uzbekistan) Sanjar Fayziev | (Netherlands) Miliaan Niesten (Italy) Francesco Vilardo | 2–6, 6–7^{(3–7)} |
| Runner-up | 7. | December 2, 2017 | Hua Hin, Thailand F10 | Hard | (Russia) Yan Sabanin | (Germany) Pascal Meis (Germany) Tobias Simon | 5–7, 5–7 |

== Davis Cup ==
=== Participations: (8–0) ===
| Group membership World Group (0–0) WG Play-off (0–0) Group I (0–0) Group II (0–0) Group III (0–0) Group IV (8–0) | Matches by surface Hard (8–0) Clay (0–0) Grass (0–0) Carpet (0–0) | Matches by type Singles (4–0) Doubles (4–0) |

- ▲ ▼ indicates the outcome of the Davis Cup match followed by the score, date, place of event, the zonal classification and its phase, and the court surface.

| Rubber outcome | No. | Rubber | Match type (partner if any) | Opponent nation | Opponent player(s) | Score |
▲2–1; 13 April 2011; National Tennis Complex, Dhaka, Bangladesh; Asia/Oceania Group IV Round robin; Hard surface
| Victory | 1 | II | Singles | Bahrain | Khaled Al-Thawadi | 6–2, 6–0 |
| Victory | 2 | III | Doubles (with Denis Surotin) | Bahrain | Hasan Abdulnabi / Khaled Al-Thawadi | 6–1, 7–6^{(7–5)} |
▲2–1; 14 April 2011; National Tennis Complex, Dhaka, Bangladesh; Asia/Oceania Group IV Round robin; Hard surface
| Victory | 3 | II | Singles | Jordan | Mohammad Al-Aisowi | 6–2, 7–5 |
| Victory | 4 | III | Doubles (with Denis Surotin) | Jordan | Ahmed Ibrahim Ahmad Alhadid / Fawaz El Hourani | 6–2, 7–5 |
▲2–1; 15 April 2011; National Tennis Complex, Dhaka, Bangladesh; Asia/Oceania Group IV Round robin; Hard surface
| Victory | 5 | II | Singles | Qatar | Jabor Al-Mutawa | 6–1, 6–1 |
| Victory | 6 | III | Doubles (with Denis Surotin) | Qatar | Jabor Al-Mutawa / Mousa Shanan Zayed | 7–6^{(7–2)}, 6–3 |
▲2–1; 16 April 2011; National Tennis Complex, Dhaka, Bangladesh; Asia/Oceania Group IV Promotional play-off; Hard surface
| Victory | 7 | II | Singles | Iraq | Akram M. Abdalkarem Al-Saady | 6–2, 6–2 |
| Victory | 8 | III | Doubles (with Denis Surotin) | Iraq | Ali Khairi Hashim Al Mayahi / Akram M. Abdalkarem Al-Saady | 6–2, 6–1 |
