= 2016 Fergana Challenger =

- Date: 13–19 June
- Edition: 17th (men); 6th (women)
- Prize money: $50,000 (men) $25,000 (women)
- Surface: Hard
- Location: Fergana, Uzbekistan

Champions

Men's singles
- (Moldova) Radu Albot

Women's singles
- (Russia) Polina Monova

Men's doubles
- (France) Yannick Jankovits / (Switzerland) Luca Margaroli

Women's doubles
- (Russia) Polina Monova / (Russia) Yana Sizikova
← 2015 ·	Fergana Challenger	· 2017 →

The 2016 Fergana Challenger was a professional tennis tournament played on hard courts. It was the 17th edition of the tournament for men which was part of the 2016 ATP Challenger Tour, offering a total of $50,000 in prize money, and the sixth edition of the event for women on the 2016 ITF Women's Circuit, offering a total of $25,000 in prize money. It took place in Fergana, Uzbekistan, on 13–19 June 2016.

== Men's singles main draw entrants ==
=== Seeds ===
Country	Player	Rank^{1}	Seed
RUS	Konstantin Kravchuk	109	1
MDA	Radu Albot	113	2
RUS	Alexander Kudryavtsev	160	3
KAZ	Dmitry Popko	211	4
KOR	Lee Duck-hee	225	5
UKR	Denys Molchanov	229	6
SRB	Nikola Milojević	240	7
BLR	Ilya Ivashka	247	8

- ^{1} Rankings as of 6 June 2016.

=== Other entrants ===
The following players received wildcards into the singles main draw:

- (Uzbekistan) Sanjar Fayziev
- (Uzbekistan) Jurabek Karimov
- (Uzbekistan) Shonigmatjon Shofayziyev
- (Uzbekistan) Khumoun Sultanov

The following players received entry from the qualifying draw:

- (Italy) Alessandro Bega
- (Chinese Taipei) Chen Ti
- (Russia) Anton Zaitcev
- (Belarus) Dzmitry Zhyrmont

== Women's singles main draw entrants ==
=== Seeds ===
Country	Player	Rank^{1}	Seed
UZB	Nigina Abduraimova	174	1
UZB	Sabina Sharipova	207	2
RUS	Ksenia Lykina	222	3
UKR	Valeriya Strakhova	239	4
RUS	Natela Dzalamidze	269	5
IND	Ankita Raina	306	6
RUS	Yana Sizikova	338	7
RUS	Veronika Kudermetova	351	8

- ^{1} Rankings as of 6 June 2016.

=== Other entrants ===
The following players received wildcards into the singles main draw:

- (Kazakhstan) Gozal Ainitdinova
- (Uzbekistan) Shakhnoza Khatamova
- (Uzbekistan) Sarvinoz Saidhujaeva
- (Uzbekistan) Guzal Yusupova

The following players received entry from the qualifying draw:

- (Russia) Yuliya Kalabina
- (Ukraine) Veronika Kapshay
- (Russia) Varvara Kuznetsova
- (Uzbekistan) Polina Merenkova
- (Russia) Polina Monova
- (United States) Alexandra Riley
- (Uzbekistan) Jamilya Sadykzhanova
- (Uzbekistan) Komola Umarova

The following player received entry by a junior exempt:

- (Slovakia) Tereza Mihalíková

== Champions ==
=== Men's singles ===
- (Moldova) Radu Albot def. (Russia) Konstantin Kravchuk, 6–4, 6–2

=== Women's singles ===
- (Russia) Polina Monova def. (Uzbekistan) Sabina Sharipova, 6–3, 0–6, 6–4

=== Men's doubles ===
- (France) Yannick Jankovits / (Switzerland) Luca Margaroli def. (Japan) Toshihide Matsui / (India) Vishnu Vardhan, 6–4, 7–6^{(7–4)}

=== Women's doubles ===
- (Russia) Polina Monova / (Russia) Yana Sizikova def. (India) Prerna Bhambri / (India) Ankita Raina, 7–6^{(7–0)}, 6–2
