= Tennis at the 2017 Islamic Solidarity Games =

- Venue: Baku Tennis Academy
- Dates: 12–22 May 2017

Tennis competitions at the 2017 Islamic Solidarity Games was held from 12 to 22 May 2017 at the Baku Tennis Academy, Azerbaijan.

== Medal table ==
Rank	Nation	Gold	Silver	Bronze	Total
1	Turkey (TUR)	6	2	0	8
2	Uzbekistan (UZB)	0	3	2	5
3	Pakistan (PAK)	0	1	0	1
4	Malaysia (MAS)	0	0	1	1
4	Morocco (MAR)	0	0	1	1
4	Qatar (QAT)	0	0	1	1
4	Turkmenistan (TKM)	0	0	1	1
Totals (7 entries)		6	6	6	18

== Medal events ==
Event	Gold	Silver	Bronze
Men's singles	Altuğ Çelikbilek; Turkey	Anıl Yüksel; Turkey	Mubarak Al-Harrasi; Qatar
Women's singles	Ayla Aksu; Turkey	Berfu Cengiz; Turkey	Sabina Sharipova; Uzbekistan
Men's doubles	Turkey; Sarp Ağabigün; Altuğ Çelikbilek	Uzbekistan; Saida'lo Saidkarimov; Amal Sultanbekov	Morocco; Amine Ahouda; Ayoub Chakrouni
Women's doubles	Turkey; Ayla Aksu; Berfu Cengiz	Uzbekistan; Polina Merenkova; Sabina Sharipova	Malaysia; Jawairiah Noordin; Theiviya Selvarajoo
Men's Team	(Turkey) Turkey; Sarp Ağabigün; Altuğ Çelikbilek; Muhammet Haylaz; Anıl Yüksel	(Pakistan) Pakistan; Muhammad Abid; Mohammad Abid Ali Khan Akbar; Aqeel Khan; Muzammil Murtaza	(Uzbekistan) Uzbekistan; Sergey Fomin; Saida'lo Saidkarimov; Amal Sultanbekov
Women's Team	(Turkey) Turkey; Ayla Aksu; Berfu Cengiz; Başak Eraydın; Melis Sezer	(Uzbekistan) Uzbekistan; Polina Merenkova; Sabina Sharipova; Komola Umarova	(Turkmenistan) Turkmenistan; Jahana Bayramova; Guljan Muhammetkuliyeva; Anastasiya Prenko

== Men's singles ==
=== Finals ===
Semifinals
(Turkey) Altuğ Çelikbilek	6	3	6
(Morocco) Amine Ahouda	3	6	3
(Qatar) Mubarak Al-Harrasi	3	2
(Turkey) Anıl Yüksel	6	6

Gold medal match
(Turkey) Altuğ Çelikbilek	6	6
(Turkey) Anıl Yüksel	4	4
Bronze medal match
(Morocco) Amine Ahouda	0	0^{r}
(Qatar) Mubarak Al-Harrasi	6	0

=== Top half ===
First round
(Jordan) S Adas	4	2
9	(Iran) HR Nadaf	6	6
(Maldives) A Fazeel	3	3
12	(Turkmenistan) Y Rogusskiy	6	6
(Malaysia) MA Merzuki	5	1
13	(Uzbekistan) S Fomin	7	6
(Saudi Arabia) F Al Saad	6	6
14	(Azerbaijan) R Gojayev	1	1
(Pakistan) A Khan	3	6	6^{4}
10	(Uganda) DK Mugabe	6	2	7^{7}
(Qatar) AS Alharrasi	3	2
15	(Benin) M Yakpa	6	6

Second round
(Turkey) A Çelikbilek	7	6
(Iran) HR Nadaf	5	3
(Turkmenistan) Y Rogusskiy	2	2
(Uzbekistan) S Fomin	6	6
(Morocco) A Ahouda	6	6
(Saudi Arabia) F Al Saad	0	3
(Uganda) DK Mugabe	6	6
(Benin) M Yakpa	3	3

Quarterfinals
(Turkey) A Çelikbilek	6	6
(Uzbekistan) S Fomin	3	2
(Morocco) A Ahouda	7	6
(Uganda) DK Mugabe	5	3

Semifinals
(Turkey) A Çelikbilek	6	3	6
(Morocco) A Ahouda	3	6	3

=== Bottom half ===
First round
(Qatar) M Al-Harrasi	7	6
16	(Pakistan) M Abid	5	0
(Uganda) D Oringa	5	1
9	(Malaysia) AD Abdul Razak	7	6
(Jordan) M Al Kotop	5	3
12	(Iran) A Madanchi	7	6
(Uzbekistan) S Saidkarimov	6	6
11	(Mozambique) JS Elias	1	0
(Saudi Arabia) A Alhaqbani	6	6
14	(Oman) Y Al Rawahi	4	1
(Azerbaijan) F Nikolic	4	6	6^{3}
10	(Turkmenistan) G Pochay	6	2	7^{7}

Second round
(Qatar) M Al-Harrasi	6	5	6
(Malaysia) AD Abdul Razak	4	7	2
(Iran) A Madanchi	5	7	6
(Morocco) A Chakrouni	7	5	2
(Uzbekistan) S Saidkarimov	6	6
(Saudi Arabia) A Alhaqbani	3	4
(Turkmenistan) G Pochay	0	4
(Turkey) A Yüksel	6	6

Quarterfinals
(Qatar) M Al-Harrasi	6	4	7
(Iran) A Madanchi	4	6	6^{5}
(Uzbekistan) S Saidkarimov	4	4
(Turkey) A Yüksel	6	6

Semifinals
(Qatar) M Al-Harrasi	3	2
(Turkey) A Yüksel	6	6

== Women's singles ==
=== Finals ===
Semifinals
(Uzbekistan) Sabina Sharipova	4	6^{4}
(Turkey) Berfu Cengiz	6	7
(Oman) Fatma Al-Nabhani	5	1
(Turkey) Ayla Aksu	7	6

Gold medal match
(Turkey) Berfu Cengiz	3	2
(Turkey) Ayla Aksu	6	6
Bronze medal match
(Uzbekistan) Sabina Sharipova	6	6
(Oman) Fatma Al-Nabhani	2	2

=== Top half ===
First round
(Maldives) AR Zeina	1	0
9	(Iran) G Pakbaten	6	6

Second round
(Uzbekistan) S Sharipova	6	6
(Iran) G Pakbaten	2	0
(Turkmenistan) J Bayramova	6	6
(Azerbaijan) U Hashimova	1	2
(Turkey) B Cengiz	6	6
(Pakistan) SM Khan	0	0
(Saudi Arabia) A Fareh	2	0
(Malaysia) J Noordin	6	6

Quarterfinals
(Uzbekistan) S Sharipova	6	6
(Turkmenistan) J Bayramova	2	1
(Turkey) B Cengiz	6	6
(Malaysia) J Noordin	1	0

Semifinals
(Uzbekistan) S Sharipova	4	6^{4}
(Turkey) B Cengiz	6	7

=== Bottom half ===
First round

Second round
(Pakistan) U Suhail	2	7	1
(Malaysia) T Selvarajoo	6	5	6
(Turkmenistan) A Prenko	3	0
(Oman) F Al-Nabhani	6	6
(Uzbekistan) K Umarova	6	6
(Azerbaijan) A Dik	0	0
(Iran) S Vaziri	1	3
(Turkey) A Aksu	6	6

Quarterfinals
(Malaysia) T Selvarajoo	2	6^{2}
(Oman) F Al-Nabhani	6	7
(Uzbekistan) K Umarova	5	2
(Turkey) A Aksu	7	6

Semifinals
(Oman) F Al-Nabhani	5	1
(Turkey) A Aksu	7	6

== Men's doubles ==
First round
(Turkey) S Ağabigün (Turkey) A Çelikbilek
Bye
(Uganda) DK Mugabe (Uganda) D Oringa	4	3
(Jordan) H Al-Aswad (Jordan) M Al Kotop	6	6
(Morocco) A Ahouda (Morocco) A Chakrouni
Bye
(Azerbaijan) R Gojayev (Azerbaijan) F Nikolic	6	6	[10]
(Turkmenistan) A Gurbanov (Turkmenistan) Y Rogusskiy	3	7	[5]
(Pakistan) M Abid (Pakistan) A Khan	6	7
(Iran) A Madanchi (Iran) A Shokoofi	3	6
Bye
(Malaysia) AD Abdul Razak (Malaysia) MA Merzuki
(Uzbekistan) S Saidkarimov (Uzbekistan) A Sultanbe	6	6
(Saudi Arabia) F Al Saad (Saudi Arabia) A Alhaqbani	4	1
Bye
(Qatar) Mo Al-Harrasi (Qatar) Mu Al-Harrasi

Quarterfinals
(Turkey) S Ağabigün (Turkey) A Çelikbilek	6	7
(Jordan) H Al-Aswad (Jordan) M Al Kotop	1	6^{5}
(Morocco) A Ahouda (Morocco) A Chakrouni	6	6
(Azerbaijan) R Gojayev (Azerbaijan) F Nikolic	4	3
(Pakistan) M Abid (Pakistan) A Khan	0	3
(Malaysia) AD Abdul Razak (Malaysia) MA Merzuki	6	6
(Uzbekistan) S Saidkarimov (Uzbekistan) A Sultanbe	6	5	[10]
(Qatar) Mo Al-Harrasi (Qatar) M Al-Harrasi	2	7	[6]

Semifinals
(Turkey) S Ağabigün (Turkey) A Çelikbilek	6	6
(Morocco) A Ahouda (Morocco) A Chakrouni	0	3
(Malaysia) AD Abdul Razak (Malaysia) MA Merzuki	3	3
(Uzbekistan) S Saidkarimov (Uzbekistan) A Sultanbe	6	6

Gold medal match
(Turkey) S Ağabigün (Turkey) A Çelikbilek	6	6
(Uzbekistan) S Saidkarimov (Uzbekistan) A Sultanbe	2	2
Bronze medal match
(Morocco) A Ahouda (Morocco) A Chakrouni	4	6	[10]
(Malaysia) AD Abdul Razak (Malaysia) MA Merzuki	6	3	[7]

== Women's doubles ==
Quarterfinals
(Uzbekistan) P Merenkova (Uzbekistan) S Sharipova
Bye
(Iran) G Pakbaten (Iran) S Vaziri	4	7	[5]
(Turkmenistan) J Bayramova (Turkmenistan) A Prenko	6	5	[10]
(Pakistan) M Khokhar (Pakistan) S Mansoor	4	0
(Malaysia) J Noordin (Malaysia) T Selvarajoo	6	6
(Azerbaijan) A Dik (Azerbaijan) U Hashimova	1	0
(Turkey) A Aksu (Turkey) B Cengiz	6	6

Semifinals
(Uzbekistan) P Merenkova (Uzbekistan) S Sharipova	6	6
(Turkmenistan) J Bayramova (Turkmenistan) A Prenko	4	2
(Malaysia) J Noordin (Malaysia) T Selvarajoo	3	6^{4}
(Turkey) A Aksu (Turkey) B Cengiz	6	7

Gold medal match
(Uzbekistan) P Merenkova (Uzbekistan) S Sharipova	3	5
(Turkey) A Aksu (Turkey) B Cengiz	6	7
Bronze medal match
(Turkmenistan) J Bayramova (Turkmenistan) A Prenko	6^{0}	0
(Malaysia) J Noordin (Malaysia) T Selvarajoo	7	6

== Men's team ==
=== Group A ===
Pos	Team	MP	W	L
1	Turkey	2	2	0
2	Uzbekistan	2	1	1
3	Turkmenistan	2	0	2

Source: Islamic Solidarity Games

12 May	Turkmenistan	1–2	Uzbekistan

13 May	Turkey	3–0	Turkmenistan

14 May	Turkey	3–0	Uzbekistan

=== Group B ===
Pos	Team	MP	W	L
1	Pakistan	3	3	0
2	Qatar	3	2	1
3	Jordan	3	1	2
4	Azerbaijan	3	0	3

Source: Islamic Solidarity Games

12 May	Jordan	1–2	Qatar

12 May	Azerbaijan	1–2	Pakistan

13 May	Jordan	0–3	Pakistan

13 May	Azerbaijan	0–3	Qatar

14 May	Pakistan	3–0	Qatar

14 May	Azerbaijan	0–3	Jordan

=== Bronze medal match ===
15 May	Qatar	1–2	Uzbekistan

Mubarak Al-Harrasi	2–0	Sergey Fomin	7–6^{(7-1)}, 6–3
Abdullah Alharrasi	0–2	Saida'lo Saidkarimov	0–6, 0–6
Mubarak Al-Harrasi / Mousa Al-Harrasi	0–2	Saida'lo Saidkarimov / Amal Sultanbekov	5–7, 3–6

=== Gold medal match ===
15 May	Turkey	3–0	Pakistan

Altuğ Çelikbilek	2–0	Aqeel Khan	6–3, 6–2
Anıl Yüksel	2–0	Muhammad Abid	6–0, 7–6^{(8-6)}
Sarp Ağabigün / Muhammet Haylaz	Muhammad Abid / Aqeel Khan	walkover

== Women's team ==
=== Table ===
Pos	Team	MP	W	L
1st place, gold medalist(s)	Turkey	4	4	0
2nd place, silver medalist(s)	Uzbekistan	4	3	1
3rd place, bronze medalist(s)	Turkmenistan	4	2	2
4	Azerbaijan	4	1	3
5	Pakistan	4	0	4

Source: Islamic Solidarity Games

12 May	Azerbaijan	0–3	Uzbekistan

Umayra Hashimova	0–2	Sabina Sharipova	1–6, 1–6
Alina Gavrish	0–2	Komola Umarova	2–6, 0–6
Umayra Hashimova / Zuleykha Safarova	0–2	Komola Umarova / Polina Merenkova	2–6, 0–6

12 May	Pakistan	0–3	Turkmenistan

Ushna Suhail	0–2	Anastasiya Prenko	1–6, 6–7^{(2-7)}
Sara Mansoor	0–2	Jahana Bayramova	2–6, 2–6
Meheq Khokhar / Sarah Mahboob Khan	0–2	Jahana Bayramova / Guljan Muhammetkuliyeva	1–6, 6–7^{(5-7)}

13 May	Pakistan	0–3	Turkey

Ushna Suhail	0–2	Başak Eraydın	0–6, 0–6
Sara Mansoor	0–2	Ayla Aksu	0–6, 0–6
Sara Mansoor / Ushna Suhail	0–2	Berfu Cengiz / Melis Sezer	0–6, 0–6

13 May	Azerbaijan	1–2	Turkmenistan

Alina Gavrish	0–2	Anastasiya Prenko	0–6, 1–6
Zuleykha Safarova	0–2	Jahana Bayramova	1–6, 2–6
Alina Gavrish / Umayra Hashimova	2–1	Jahana Bayramova / Guljan Muhammetkuliyeva	7–5, 6–7^{(2-7)}, 6–3

14 May	Turkmenistan	0–3	Uzbekistan

Anastasiya Prenko	0–2	Sabina Sharipova	0–6, 1–6
Jahana Bayramova	0–2	Komola Umarova	0–6, 0–4 ret.
Jahana Bayramova / Anastasiya Prenko	Polina Merenkova / Sabina Sharipova	walkover

14 May	Azerbaijan	0–3	Turkey

Umayra Hashimova	0–2	Başak Eraydın	0–6, 0–6
Zemfira Aghapayova	0–2	Ayla Aksu	0–6, 0–6
Alina Gavrish / Umayra Hashimova	0–2	Berfu Cengiz / Melis Sezer	1–6, 0–6

14 May	Pakistan	0–3	Uzbekistan

Ushna Suhail	0–2	Sabina Sharipova	1–6, 0–6
Sarah Mahboob Khan	0–2	Komola Umarova	0–6, 2–6
Meheq Khokhar / Sara Mansoor	0–2	Polina Merenkova / Sabina Sharipova	0–6, 2–6

14 May	Turkey	2–0	Turkmenistan

Ayla Aksu	2–0	Anastasiya Prenko	6–0, 6–2
Berfu Cengiz	2–0	Guljan Muhammetkuliyeva	6–0, 6–0

15 May	Azerbaijan	2–1	Pakistan

Umayra Hashimova	2–0	Ushna Suhail	7–5, 6–1
Zuleykha Safarova	1–2	Sarah Mahboob Khan	6–2, 6–7^{(9-11)}, 0–6
Umayra Hashimova / Zuleykha Safarova	2–0	Sara Mansoor / Ushna Suhail	6–2, 6–4

15 May	Turkey	3–0	Uzbekistan

Başak Eraydın	2–0	Sabina Sharipova	6–4, 6–4
Ayla Aksu	2–0	Komola Umarova	6–1, 6–0
Ayla Aksu / Başak Eraydın	Polina Merenkova / Sabina Sharipova	walkover
