= 2016 Tashkent Open – Doubles =

Doubles
- 2016 Tashkent Open

Final
- Champions: (Romania) Raluca Olaru (Turkey) İpek Soylu
- Runners-up: (Netherlands) Demi Schuurs (Czech Republic) Renata Voráčová
- Score: 7–5, 6–3

Details
- Draw: 16
- Seeds: 4

Events
Singles	Doubles
← 2015 ·	Tashkent Open	· 2017 →

Margarita Gasparyan and Alexandra Panova were the defending champions, but Gasparyan could not participate due to injury. Panova teamed up with Evgeniya Rodina, but they retired in the first round against Demi Schuurs and Renata Voráčová.

Raluca Olaru and İpek Soylu won the title, defeating Schuurs and Voráčová in the final 7–5, 6–3.

== Seeds ==
1. (Ukraine) Lyudmyla Kichenok / (Ukraine) Nadiia Kichenok (quarterfinals)
2. (United States) Nicole Melichar / (Thailand) Varatchaya Wongteanchai (quarterfinals)
3. (Netherlands) Demi Schuurs / (Czech Republic) Renata Voráčová (final)
4. (Romania) Raluca Olaru / (Turkey) İpek Soylu (champions)

== Draw ==
=== Key ===
- Q = Qualifier
- WC = Wild card
- LL = Lucky loser
- Alt = Alternate
- SE = Special exempt
- PR = Protected ranking
- ITF = ITF entry
- JE = Junior exempt
- w/o = Walkover
- r = Retired
- d = Defaulted
- SR = Special ranking

=== Draw ===
First round
1	(Ukraine) L Kichenok (Ukraine) N Kichenok	6	6
WC	(Uzbekistan) A Folts (Uzbekistan) K Umarova	4	0
(Poland) K Piter (Spain) S Soler Espinosa	5	5
(Uzbekistan) N Abduraimova (Japan) H Kuwata	7	7
3	(Netherlands) D Schuurs (Czech Republic) R Voráčová	3
(Russia) A Panova (Russia) E Rodina	2^{r}
(United States) J Cako (United Kingdom) E Webley-Smith	2	6	[7]
(Uzbekistan) A Amanmuradova (Russia) V Diatchenko	6	4	[10]
WC	(Uzbekistan) P Merenkova (Ukraine) D Yastremska	4	6	[10]
(Japan) N Hibino (India) P Thombare	6	3	[8]
(Russia) I Khromacheva (Belarus) L Marozava	5	4
4	(Romania) R Olaru (Turkey) İ Soylu	7	6
(United Kingdom) N Broady (Turkey) Ç Büyükakçay	4	5
(Czech Republic) Kr Plíšková (Switzerland) A Sadiković	6	7
(Czech Republic) L Kunčíková (Czech Republic) K Stuchlá	4	2
2	(United States) N Melichar (Thailand) Vara Wongteanchai	6	6

Quarterfinals
1	(Ukraine) L Kichenok (Ukraine) N Kichenok	4	4
(Uzbekistan) N Abduraimova (Japan) H Kuwata	6	6
3	(Netherlands) D Schuurs (Czech Republic) R Voráčová	6^{7}	7^{7}	[10]
(Uzbekistan) A Amanmuradova (Russia) V Diatchenko	7^{9}	6^{5}	[7]
WC	(Uzbekistan) P Merenkova (Ukraine) D Yastremska	2	6^{2}
4	(Romania) R Olaru (Turkey) İ Soylu	6	7^{7}
(Czech Republic) Kr Plíšková (Switzerland) A Sadiković	7^{11}	6
2	(United States) N Melichar (Thailand) Vara Wongteanchai	6^{9}	3

Semifinals
(Uzbekistan) N Abduraimova (Japan) H Kuwata	6^{5}	3
3	(Netherlands) D Schuurs (Czech Republic) R Voráčová	7^{7}	6
4	(Romania) R Olaru (Turkey) İ Soylu	7	6
(Czech Republic) Kr Plíšková (Switzerland) A Sadiković	5	2

Final
3	(Netherlands) D Schuurs (Czech Republic) R Voráčová	5	3
4	(Romania) R Olaru (Turkey) İ Soylu	7	6
