= 2017 Tashkent Open – Doubles =

Doubles
- 2017 Tashkent Open

Final
- Champions: (Hungary) Tímea Babos (Czech Republic) Andrea Hlaváčková
- Runners-up: (Japan) Nao Hibino (Georgia (country)) Oksana Kalashnikova
- Score: 7–5, 6–4

Details
- Draw: 16
- Seeds: 4

Events
| Singles | Doubles |
| ← 2016 · | Tashkent Open | · 2018 → |

Raluca Olaru and İpek Soylu were the defending champions, but Olaru chose to compete in Wuhan instead. Soylu played alongside Irina Khromacheva, but lost in the semifinal to Tímea Babos and Andrea Hlaváčková.

Babos and Hlaváčková went on to win the title, defeating Nao Hibino and Oksana Kalashnikova in the final, 7–5, 6–4.

== Seeds ==
1. (Hungary) Tímea Babos / (Czech Republic) Andrea Hlaváčková (champions)
2. (Japan) Nao Hibino / (Georgia (country)) Oksana Kalashnikova (final)
3. (Ukraine) Kateryna Bondarenko / (Serbia) Aleksandra Krunić (semifinals)
4. (Russia) Irina Khromacheva / (Turkey) İpek Soylu (semifinals)

== Draw ==
=== Key ===
- Q = Qualifier
- WC = Wild card
- LL = Lucky loser
- Alt = Alternate
- SE = Special exempt
- PR = Protected ranking
- ITF = ITF entry
- JE = Junior exempt
- w/o = Walkover
- r = Retired
- d = Defaulted
- SR = Special ranking

=== Draw ===
First round
1 | (Hungary) T Babos (Czech Republic) A Hlaváčková | 6 | 7
(Russia) A Blinkova (Russia) A Kudryavtseva | 1 | 5
(Russia) V Diatchenko (Ukraine) K Kozlova | 4 | 6 | [7]
(Australia) M Adamczak (Australia) L Cabrera | 6 | 4 | [10]
4 | (Russia) I Khromacheva (Turkey) İ Soylu | 6 | 6
WC | (Czech Republic) Kr Plíšková (Uzbekistan) I Tulyaganova | 2 | 4
(Germany) N Geuer (Netherlands) E Wacanno | 6 | 6
(Russia) E Alexandrova (Belarus) A Sabalenka | 2 | 2
WC | (Uzbekistan) O Kim (Uzbekistan) S Yuldasheva | 0 | 2
(Russia) A Kalinskaya (Russia) E Rodina | 6 | 6
(Slovakia) J Čepelová (Japan) M Eguchi | 3 | 0
3 | (Ukraine) K Bondarenko (Serbia) A Krunić | 6 | 6
(Uzbekistan) N Abduraimova (Uzbekistan) A Amanmuradova | 6 | 5 | [6]
(Romania) A Bogdan (Switzerland) S Vögele | 3 | 7 | [10]
(Belarus) L Marozava (Uzbekistan) S Sharipova | 3 | 2
2 | (Japan) N Hibino (Georgia (country)) O Kalashnikova | 6 | 6

Quarterfinals
1 | (Hungary) T Babos (Czech Republic) A Hlaváčková | 6 | 2 | [10]
(Australia) M Adamczak (Australia) L Cabrera | 4 | 6 | [6]
4 | (Russia) I Khromacheva (Turkey) İ Soylu | 7^{7} | 6
(Germany) N Geuer (Netherlands) E Wacanno | 6^{4} | 3
(Russia) A Kalinskaya (Russia) E Rodina
3 | (Ukraine) K Bondarenko (Serbia) A Krunić | w/o
(Romania) A Bogdan (Switzerland) S Vögele | 1 | 3
2 | (Japan) N Hibino (Georgia (country)) O Kalashnikova | 6 | 6

Semifinals
1 | (Hungary) T Babos (Czech Republic) A Hlaváčková | 6 | 6
4 | (Russia) I Khromacheva (Turkey) İ Soylu | 2 | 3
3 | (Ukraine) K Bondarenko (Serbia) A Krunić | 4 | 6 | [10]
2 | (Japan) N Hibino (Georgia (country)) O Kalashnikova | 6 | 3 | [12]

Final
1 | (Hungary) T Babos (Czech Republic) A Hlaváčková | 7 | 6
2 | (Japan) N Hibino (Georgia (country)) O Kalashnikova | 5 | 4
