= 2017 Tashkent Open – Singles =

Singles
- 2017 Tashkent Open

Final
- Champion: (Ukraine) Kateryna Bondarenko
- Runner-up: (Hungary) Tímea Babos
- Score: 6–4, 6–4

Details
- Draw: 32
- Seeds: 8

Events
Singles	Doubles
- Tashkent Open

Kristýna Plíšková was the defending champion, but lost in the second round to Kurumi Nara.

Kateryna Bondarenko won the title, defeating Tímea Babos in the final, 6–4, 6–4.

== Seeds ==
1. (Czech Republic) Kristýna Plíšková (second round)
2. (Hungary) Tímea Babos (final)
3. (Germany) Tatjana Maria (second round)
4. (Romania) Irina-Camelia Begu (first round)
5. (Czech Republic) Markéta Vondroušová (second round)
6. (Serbia) Aleksandra Krunić (quarterfinals)
7. (Japan) Nao Hibino (second round)
8. (Russia) Ekaterina Alexandrova (second round)

== Draw ==
Key

- Q = Qualifier
- WC = Wild card
- LL = Lucky loser
- Alt = Alternate
- ITF = ITF entry
- PR = Protected ranking
- SR = Special ranking
- SE = Special exempt
- JE = Junior exempt
- JR = Junior Accelerator Programme entrant
- CO = College Accelerator Programme entrant
- NG = Next Gen Accelerator Program entrant
- w/o = Walkover
- r = Retired
- d = Defaulted

=== Finals ===
Semifinals
(Ukraine) Kateryna Bondarenko	7^{9}	4
Q	(Russia) Vera Zvonareva	6^{7}	1^{r}
(Belarus) Aryna Sabalenka	1	4
2	(Hungary) Tímea Babos	6	6

Final
(Ukraine) Kateryna Bondarenko	6	6
2	(Hungary) Tímea Babos	4	4

=== Top half ===
First round
1	(Czech Republic) Kr Plíšková	7^{7}	6^{4}	6
(Chinese Taipei) S-w Hsieh	6^{3}	7^{7}	4
WC	(Uzbekistan) N Abduraimova	1	1
(Japan) K Nara	6	6
(Russia) A Blinkova	3	2
(Ukraine) K Bondarenko	6	6
Q	(Russia) I Khromacheva	3	2
7	(Japan) N Hibino	6	6
4	(Romania) I-C Begu	6	2	4
Q	(Russia) V Zvonareva	2	6	6
(France) P Parmentier	6	6
(Japan) R Ozaki	2	4
(Slovakia) J Čepelová	2	6	6
(Czech Republic) T Martincová	6	0	2
(Netherlands) R Hogenkamp	6^{5}	0
6	(Serbia) A Krunić	7^{7}	6

Second round
1	(Czech Republic) Kr Plíšková	6^{5}	1
(Japan) K Nara	7^{7}	6
(Ukraine) K Bondarenko	6	7
7	(Japan) N Hibino	4	5
Q	(Russia) V Zvonareva	6	6
(France) P Parmentier	2	0
(Slovakia) J Čepelová	2	6	3
6	(Serbia) A Krunić	6	1	6

Quarterfinals
(Japan) K Nara	2	7	4
(Ukraine) K Bondarenko	6	5	6
Q	(Russia) V Zvonareva	6	6
6	(Serbia) A Krunić	4	3

Semifinals
(Ukraine) K Bondarenko	7	4
Q	(Russia) V Zvonareva	5	1^{r}

=== Bottom half ===
First round
8	(Russia) E Alexandrova	7^{7}	6
Q	(Australia) L Cabrera	6^{2}	2
(Ukraine) K Kozlova	6	6
WC	(Uzbekistan) A Amanmuradova	1	0
(Belarus) A Sabalenka	6	6
(Russia) E Rodina	2	2
PR	(Russia) V Diatchenko	3	1
3	(Germany) T Maria	6	6
5	(Czech Republic) M Vondroušová	6	6
PR	(Japan) M Eguchi	1	1
WC	(Uzbekistan) S Sharipova	1	3
PR	(Switzerland) S Vögele	6	6
(Czech Republic) D Allertová	6	3	6
Q	(Croatia) J Fett	2	6	3
(Sweden) J Larsson	1	1
2	(Hungary) T Babos	6	6

Second round
8	(Russia) E Alexandrova	2	3
(Ukraine) K Kozlova	6	6
(Belarus) A Sabalenka	6	7
3	(Germany) T Maria	3	5
5	(Czech Republic) M Vondroušová	6^{8}	6	5
PR	(Switzerland) S Vögele	7^{10}	4	7
(Czech Republic) D Allertová	3	3
2	(Hungary) T Babos	6	6

Quarterfinals
(Ukraine) K Kozlova	6^{5}	6	1
(Belarus) A Sabalenka	7^{7}	3	6
PR	(Switzerland) S Vögele	3	4
2	(Hungary) T Babos	6	6

Semifinals
(Belarus) A Sabalenka	1	4
2	(Hungary) T Babos	6	6

== Qualifying ==
=== Seeds ===
1. (Croatia) Jana Fett (qualified)
2. (Romania) Ana Bogdan (qualifying competition)
3. (Italy) Jasmine Paolini (qualifying competition)
4. (Russia) Irina Khromacheva (qualified)
5. (Australia) Lizette Cabrera (qualified)
6. (Ukraine) Anhelina Kalinina (first round, retired)
7. (Turkey) İpek Soylu (qualifying competition, retired)
8. (Russia) Anna Kalinskaya (qualifying competition)

=== Qualifiers ===
1. (Croatia) Jana Fett
2. (Australia) Lizette Cabrera
3. (Russia) Vera Zvonareva
4. (Russia) Irina Khromacheva

=== Qualifying draw ===
==== First qualifier ====
First round
1	(Croatia) Jana Fett	6	6
(Russia) Alla Kudryavtseva	4	1
WC	(Uzbekistan) Sevil Yuldasheva	0	1
7	(Turkey) İpek Soylu	6	6

Qualifying competition
1	(Croatia) Jana Fett	3
7	(Turkey) İpek Soylu	0^{r}

==== Second qualifier ====
First round
2	(Romania) Ana Bogdan	6	6
WC	(Kazakhstan) Gozal Ainitdinova	2	2
(Greece) Valentini Grammatikopoulou	3	6	3
5	(Australia) Lizette Cabrera	6	2	6

Qualifying competition
2	(Romania) Ana Bogdan	1	6	6^{4}
5	(Australia) Lizette Cabrera	6	2	7^{7}

==== Third qualifier ====
First round
3	(Italy) Jasmine Paolini	4	6	6
(Ukraine) Katarina Zavatska	6	3	1
(Russia) Vera Zvonareva	6	1
6	(Ukraine) Anhelina Kalinina	4	0^{r}

Qualifying competition
3	(Italy) Jasmine Paolini	0	2
(Russia) Vera Zvonareva	6	6

==== Fourth qualifier ====
First round
4	(Russia) Irina Khromacheva	6	6
WC	(Uzbekistan) Nasiba Espolova	0	1
WC	(Uzbekistan) Olesya Kim	0	2
8	(Russia) Anna Kalinskaya	6	6

Qualifying competition
4	(Russia) Irina Khromacheva	6	6
8	(Russia) Anna Kalinskaya	1	1
