= 2016 Fergana Challenger – Men's singles =

Men's singles
- 2016 Fergana Challenger

Final
- Champion: (Moldova) Radu Albot
- Runner-up: (Russia) Konstantin Kravchuk
- Score: 6–4, 6–2

Events
Singles	men	women
Doubles	men	women
- Fergana Challenger

Teymuraz Gabashvili was the defending champion, but decided not to defend his title.

Radu Albot won the title after defeating Konstantin Kravchuk 6–4, 6–2 in the final.

== Seeds ==
1. (Russia) Konstantin Kravchuk (final)
2. (Moldova) Radu Albot (champion)
3. (Russia) Alexander Kudryavtsev (quarterfinals, retired)
4. (Kazakhstan) Dmitry Popko (quarterfinals)
5. (South Korea) Lee Duck-hee (semifinals)
6. (Ukraine) Denys Molchanov (first round, retired)
7. (Serbia) Nikola Milojević (semifinals)
8. (Belarus) Ilya Ivashka (quarterfinals)

== Draw ==
Key

- Q = Qualifier
- WC = Wild card
- LL = Lucky loser
- Alt = Alternate
- ITF = ITF entry
- PR = Protected ranking
- SR = Special ranking
- SE = Special exempt
- JE = Junior exempt
- JR = Junior Accelerator Programme entrant
- CO = College Accelerator Programme entrant
- NG = Next Gen Accelerator Program entrant
- w/o = Walkover
- r = Retired
- d = Defaulted

=== Finals ===
Semifinals
1	(Russia) Konstantin Kravchuk	6	6
7	(Serbia) Nikola Milojević	2	2
5	(South Korea) Lee Duck-hee	7^{8}	4	1
2	(Moldova) Radu Albot	6^{6}	6	6

Final
1	(Russia) Konstantin Kravchuk	4	2
2	(Moldova) Radu Albot	6	6

=== Top half ===
First round
1	(Russia) K Kravchuk	6	6
(France) Y Jankovits	4	0
(Uzbekistan) T Ismailov	1	6	2
(Belgium) Julien Dubail	6	3	6
(Czech Republic) Michal Konečný	4	6^{2}
(Serbia) M Janković	6	7^{7}
(Republic of Ireland) S Barry	3	1
8	(Belarus) I Ivashka	6	6
3	(Russia) A Kudryavtsev	6	6
WC	(Uzbekistan) J Karimov	2	4
(Slovenia) B Kavčič	6	4	6
(Spain) R Ortega Olmedo	2	6	3
(Serbia) D Petrović	4^{2}	2
Q	(Russia) A Zaitcev	7^{7}	6
WC	(Uzbekistan) K Sultanov	4	2
7	(Serbia) N Milojević	6	6

Second round
1	(Russia) K Kravchuk	6	6
(Belgium) J Dubail	2	2
(Serbia) M Janković	5	6^{8}
8	(Belarus) I Ivashka	7	7^{10}
3	(Russia) A Kudryavtsev	6	6
(Slovenia) B Kavčič	3	4
Q	(Russia) A Zaitcev	3	3
7	(Serbia) N Milojević	6	6

Quarterfinals
1	(Russia) K Kravchuk	7	7^{8}
8	(Belarus) I Ivashka	5	6^{6}
3	(Russia) A Kudryavtsev	2^{r}
7	(Serbia) N Milojević	3

Semifinals
1	(Russia) K Kravchuk	6	6
7	(Serbia) N Milojević	2	2

=== Bottom half ===
First round
5	(South Korea) D-h Lee	7^{7}	6
(India) V Vardhan	6^{4}	3
(Switzerland) A Bossel	4	6^{6}
Q	(Italy) A Bega	6	7^{8}
Q	(Chinese Taipei) T Chen	6	4
(Belgium) J Cagnina	2	1^{r}
WC	(Uzbekistan) S Fayziev	0	4
4	(Kazakhstan) D Popko	6	6
6	(Ukraine) D Molchanov	6^{4}	5^{r}
(Japan) Shuichi Sekiguchi	7^{7}	6
(Ecuador) G Lapentti	3	0^{r}
Q	(Belarus) D Zhyrmont	6	1
WC	(Uzbekistan) Shonigmatjon Shofayziyev	7^{7}	2	4
(France) S Doumbia	6^{3}	6	6
(Russia) A Vatutin	1	0
2	(Moldova) R Albot	6	6

Second round
5	(South Korea) D-h Lee	6	1	6
Q	(Italy) A Bega	3	6	3
Q	(Chinese Taipei) T Chen	2	2
4	(Kazakhstan) D Popko	6	6
(Japan) S Sekiguchi	6	4	6
Q	(Belarus) D Zhyrmont	3	6	3
(France) S Doumbia	4	6^{4}
2	(Moldova) R Albot	6	7^{7}

Quarterfinals
5	(South Korea) D-h Lee	6	6
4	(Kazakhstan) D Popko	4	3
(Japan) S Sekiguchi	6^{5}	3
2	(Moldova) R Albot	7^{7}	6

Semifinals
5	(South Korea) D-h Lee	7^{8}	4	1
2	(Moldova) R Albot	6^{6}	6	6
