= 2024 Qatar ExxonMobil Open – Doubles =

Doubles
- 2024 Qatar ExxonMobil Open

Final
- Champions: (United Kingdom) Jamie Murray (New Zealand) Michael Venus
- Runners-up: (Italy) Lorenzo Musetti (Italy) Lorenzo Sonego
- Score: 7–6^{(7–0)}, 2–6, [10–8]

Details
- Draw: 16
- Seeds: 4

Events
Singles	Doubles
← 2023 ·	ATP Qatar Open	· 2025 →

Jamie Murray and Michael Venus defeated Lorenzo Musetti and Lorenzo Sonego in the final, 7–6^{(7–0)}, 2–6, [10–8] to win the doubles tennis title at the 2024 ATP Qatar Open.

Rohan Bopanna and Matthew Ebden were the reigning champions, but chose not to participate this year. Since Ebden's next-best result for ranking purposes was better than Bopanna's, Ebden attained the ATP No. 1 doubles ranking when their 2023 points were replaced at the end of the tournament.

== Seeds ==
1. (United Kingdom) Jamie Murray / (New Zealand) Michael Venus (champions)
2. (United States) Nathaniel Lammons / (United States) Jackson Withrow (first round)
3. (France) Nicolas Mahut / (France) Édouard Roger-Vasselin (first round)
4. (Belgium) Sander Gillé / (Belgium) Joran Vliegen (first round)

== Draw ==
=== Key ===
- Q = Qualifier
- WC = Wild card
- LL = Lucky loser
- Alt = Alternate
- ITF = ITF entry
- PR = Protected ranking
- SR = Special ranking
- SE = Special exempt
- JE = Junior exempt
- JR = Junior Accelerator Programme entrant
- CO = College Accelerator Programme entrant
- NG = Next Gen Accelerator Program entrant
- w/o = Walkover
- r = Retired
- d = Defaulted

=== Draw ===
First round
1	(United Kingdom) J Murray (New Zealand) M Venus	7^{7}	7
(Netherlands) T Griekspoor (Netherlands) B Stevens	6^{5}	5
(Netherlands) W Koolhof (Croatia) N Mektić	3	6	[10]
WC	(Tunisia) S Mansouri (Qatar) R Nawaf	6	3	[8]
4	(Belgium) S Gillé (Belgium) J Vliegen	6^{3}	6^{6}
K Khachanov; A Rublev	7^{7}	7^{8}
(Uruguay) A Behar (Czech Republic) A Pavlásek	6	6
WC	(Spain) R Bautista Agut (Qatar) M Al-Harrasi	1	1
Alt	(Germany) A Mies (Australia) J-P Smith	6	6
(India) Y Bhambri (Netherlands) R Haase	4	3
(United Kingdom) L Glasspool (Netherlands) J-J Rojer	6	3	[12]
3	(France) N Mahut (France) É Roger-Vasselin	1	6	[10]
(Spain) A Davidovich Fokina (Finland) E Ruusuvuori	7^{7}	7^{7}
(El Salvador) M Arévalo (Croatia) M Pavić	6^{2}	6^{4}
(Italy) L Musetti (Italy) L Sonego	7^{7}	3	[15]
2	(United States) N Lammons (United States) J Withrow	6^{5}	6	[13]

Quarterfinals
1	(United Kingdom) J Murray (New Zealand) M Venus	6	7^{7}
(Netherlands) W Koolhof (Croatia) N Mektić	4	6^{2}
K Khachanov; A Rublev
(Uruguay) A Behar (Czech Republic) A Pavlásek	w/o
Alt	(Germany) A Mies (Australia) J-P Smith	3	6	[10]
(United Kingdom) L Glasspool (Netherlands) J-J Rojer	6	3	[8]
(Spain) A Davidovich Fokina (Finland) E Ruusuvuori
(Italy) L Musetti (Italy) L Sonego	w/o

Semifinals
1	(United Kingdom) J Murray (New Zealand) M Venus	6	7^{7}
(Uruguay) A Behar (Czech Republic) A Pavlásek	4	6^{5}
Alt	(Germany) A Mies (Australia) J-P Smith	2	7^{7}	[7]
(Italy) L Musetti (Italy) L Sonego	6	6^{4}	[10]

Final
1	(United Kingdom) J Murray (New Zealand) M Venus	7^{7}	2	[10]
(Italy) L Musetti (Italy) L Sonego	6^{0}	6	[8]
