= 2017 Fergana Challenger – Men's doubles =

Men's doubles
- 2017 Fergana Challenger

Final
- Champions: (India) Sriram Balaji (India) Vishnu Vardhan
- Runners-up: (Japan) Yuya Kibi (Japan) Shuichi Sekiguchi
- Score: 6–3, 6–3

Events
Singles	men	women
Doubles	men	women
- Fergana Challenger

Yannick Jankovits and Luca Margaroli were the defending champions but chose not to defend their title.

Sriram Balaji and Vishnu Vardhan won the title after defeating Yuya Kibi and Shuichi Sekiguchi 6–3, 6–3 in the final.

== Seeds ==
1. (United States) Sekou Bangoura / (Japan) Toshihide Matsui (first round)
2. (India) Sriram Balaji / (India) Vishnu Vardhan (champions)
3. (Ukraine) Vladyslav Manafov / (Belarus) Yaraslav Shyla (semifinals, withdrew)
4. (Belarus) Ilya Ivashka / (Russia) Alexander Kudryavtsev (quarterfinals, withdrew)

== Draw ==
Key

- Q = Qualifier
- WC = Wild card
- LL = Lucky loser
- Alt = Alternate
- ITF = ITF entry
- PR = Protected ranking
- SR = Special ranking
- SE = Special exempt
- JE = Junior exempt
- JR = Junior Accelerator Programme entrant
- CO = College Accelerator Programme entrant
- NG = Next Gen Accelerator Program entrant
- w/o = Walkover
- r = Retired
- d = Defaulted

First round
1	(United States) S Bangoura (Japan) T Matsui	6^{2}	3
(Poland) H Hurkacz (Canada) B Schnur	7^{7}	6
(Japan) Yuya Kibi (Japan) Shuichi Sekiguchi	6	6
WC	(Uzbekistan) T Ismailov (Uzbekistan) Sardor Pulatov	4	1
4	(Belarus) I Ivashka (Russia) A Kudryavtsev	6	6
(Uzbekistan) Sharobiddin Abzalov (Uzbekistan) Pavel Tsoy	0	4
(Uzbekistan) F Dustov (Kazakhstan) A Kedryuk	3	4
(Egypt) K-M Maamoun (Serbia) N Milojević	6	6
(Uzbekistan) S Fayziev (Kazakhstan) T Khabibulin	6	1	[4]
(Kyrgyzstan) D Duldaev (Israel) E Leshem	2	6	[10]
(Russia) Dmitry Surchenko (Russia) A Yakovlev	1	0
3	(Ukraine) V Manafov (Belarus) Y Shyla	6	6
WC	(Uzbekistan) Saida'Lo Saidkarimov (Uzbekistan) Batyr Sapaev	1	2
(Belarus) S Betov (India) P Gunneswaran	6	6
WC	(Uzbekistan) S Fomin (Uzbekistan) Azizkhon Turgunov	3	2
2	(India) S Balaji (India) V Vardhan	6	6

Quarterfinals
(Poland) H Hurkacz (Canada) B Schnur	5	0
(Japan) Y Kibi (Japan) S Sekiguchi	7	6
4	(Belarus) I Ivashka (Russia) A Kudryavtsev
(Egypt) K-M Maamoun (Serbia) N Milojević	w/o
(Kyrgyzstan) D Duldaev (Israel) E Leshem	2	3
3	(Ukraine) V Manafov (Belarus) Y Shyla	6	6
(Belarus) S Betov (India) P Gunneswaran	6^{4}	7	[8]
2	(India) S Balaji (India) V Vardhan	7^{7}	5	[10]

Semifinals
(Japan) Y Kibi (Japan) S Sekiguchi	w/o
(Egypt) K-M Maamoun (Serbia) N Milojević
3	(Ukraine) V Manafov (Belarus) Y Shyla
2	(India) S Balaji (India) V Vardhan	w/o

Final
(Japan) Y Kibi (Japan) S Sekiguchi	3	3
2	(India) S Balaji (India) V Vardhan	6	6
