= 2024 Qatar ExxonMobil Open – Singles =

Singles
- 2024 Qatar ExxonMobil Open

Final
- Champion: Karen Khachanov
- Runner-up: (Czech Republic) Jakub Menšík
- Score: 7–6^{(14–12)}, 6–4

Details
- Draw: 28 (4 Q / 3 WC )
- Seeds: 8

Events
Singles	Doubles
- ATP Qatar Open

Karen Khachanov defeated Jakub Menšík in the final, 7–6^{(14–12)}, 6–4 to win the singles tennis title at the 2024 ATP Qatar Open. It was his sixth ATP Tour singles title, and he did not lose a set en route. Menšík became the first player born in 2005 to reach an ATP Tour final, and the youngest player to reach an ATP Tour final since Carlos Alcaraz at the 2021 Croatia Open. He was also the first player to reach an ATP 250-level final after entering the tournament using the Next Gen Accelerator Program. The second round match between Menšík and Andy Murray was the longest in the history of the tournament lasting 3 hours and 23 minutes.

Daniil Medvedev was the reigning champion, but withdrew before the tournament began.

== Seeds ==
The top four seeds received a bye into the second round.

1. Andrey Rublev (quarterfinals)
2. Karen Khachanov (champion)
3. (France) Ugo Humbert (quarterfinals)
4. (Kazakhstan) Alexander Bublik (quarterfinals)
5. (Spain) Alejandro Davidovich Fokina (first round)
6. (Germany) Jan-Lennard Struff (first round)
7. (Italy) Lorenzo Musetti (first round)
8. (Netherlands) Tallon Griekspoor (withdrew)

== Draw ==
Key

- Q = Qualifier
- WC = Wild card
- LL = Lucky loser
- Alt = Alternate
- ITF = ITF entry
- PR = Protected ranking
- SR = Special ranking
- SE = Special exempt
- JE = Junior exempt
- JR = Junior Accelerator Programme entrant
- CO = College Accelerator Programme entrant
- NG = Next Gen Accelerator Program entrant
- w/o = Walkover
- r = Retired
- d = Defaulted

=== Finals ===
Semifinals
(Czech Republic) Jakub Menšík	6	1	6
WC	(France) Gaël Monfils	4	6	3
(Australia) Alexei Popyrin	6^{12}	2
2	Karen Khachanov	7^{14}	6

Final
(Czech Republic) Jakub Menšík	6^{12}	4
2	Karen Khachanov	7^{14}	6

=== Top half ===
First round
(Kazakhstan) A Shevchenko	4	4
WC	(France) R Gasquet	6	6
Q	(France) A Müller	1	6^{5}
(United Kingdom) A Murray	6	7^{7}
(Czech Republic) J Menšík	7^{7}	6
5	(Spain) A Davidovich Fokina	6^{3}	4
P Kotov	6	7
(Italy) L Sonego	2	5
WC	(France) G Monfils	6	7^{11}
(Netherlands) B van de Zandschulp	1	6^{9}
(China) Z Zhang	6	6
7	(Italy) L Musetti	2	0

Second round
1	A Rublev	6	6
WC	(France) R Gasquet	3	4
(United Kingdom) A Murray	6^{6}	7^{7}	6^{4}
(Czech Republic) J Menšík	7^{8}	6^{3}	7^{7}
3	(France) U Humbert	6	6
P Kotov	4	1
WC	(France) G Monfils	4	7	7^{7}
(China) Z Zhang	6	5	6^{2}

Quarterfinals
1	A Rublev	4	6^{6}
(Czech Republic) J Menšík	6	7^{8}
3	(France) U Humbert	2	4
WC	(France) G Monfils	6	6

Semifinals
(Czech Republic) J Menšík	6	1	6
WC	(France) G Monfils	4	6	3

=== Bottom half ===
First round
LL	(Germany) M Marterer	6^{5}	5
Q	(France) H Grenier	7^{7}	7
(Australia) A Popyrin	3	6	6
WC	(Jordan) A Shelbayh	6	3	4
(Hungary) M Fucsovics	6	6
(Spain) R Bautista Agut	1	3
6	(Germany) J-L Struff	4	4
(Australia) C O'Connell	6	6
Q	(Italy) G Zeppieri	6^{2}	5
(Finland) E Ruusuvuori	7^{7}	7
(Hungary) F Marozsán	7	7^{8}
Q	(Czech Republic) V Kopřiva	5	6^{6}

Second round
Q	(France) H Grenier	6^{3}	7^{10}	1
(Australia) A Popyrin	7^{7}	6^{8}	6
(Hungary) M Fucsovics	6	3	4
4	(Kazakhstan) A Bublik	2	6	6
(Australia) C O'Connell	3	3
(Finland) E Ruusuvuori	6	6
(Hungary) F Marozsán	4	5
2	K Khachanov	6	7

Quarterfinals
(Australia) A Popyrin	6	6
4	(Kazakhstan) A Bublik	4	4
(Finland) E Ruusuvuori	0^{r}
2	K Khachanov	3

Semifinals
(Australia) A Popyrin	6^{12}	2
2	K Khachanov	7^{14}	6

== Qualifying ==
=== Seeds ===
1. (France) Luca Van Assche (first round)
2. (France) Alexandre Müller (qualified)
3. (Germany) Maximilian Marterer (qualifying competition, lucky loser)
4. (Italy) Fabio Fognini (first round)
5. (Italy) Giulio Zeppieri (qualified)
6. (Czech Republic) Vít Kopřiva (qualified)
7. (Slovakia) Lukáš Klein (qualifying competition)
8. (France) Hugo Grenier (qualified)

=== Qualifiers ===
1. (France) Hugo Grenier
2. (France) Alexandre Müller
3. (Czech Republic) Vít Kopřiva
4. (Italy) Giulio Zeppieri

=== Lucky loser ===
1. (Germany) Maximilian Marterer

=== Qualifying draw ===
==== First qualifier ====
First round
1	(France) Luca Van Assche	3	2
(United States) Maxime Cressy	6	6
(Germany) Benjamin Hassan	6^{2}	6	3
8	(France) Hugo Grenier	7^{7}	2	6

Qualifying competition
(United States) Maxime Cressy	4	4
8	(France) Hugo Grenier	6	6

==== Second qualifier ====
First round
2	(France) Alexandre Müller	6	6
(Switzerland) Alexander Ritschard	1	2
(Kazakhstan) Beibit Zhukayev	4	3
7	(Slovakia) Lukáš Klein	6	6

Qualifying competition
2	(France) Alexandre Müller	6	6
7	(Slovakia) Lukáš Klein	4	4

==== Third qualifier ====
First round
3	(Germany) Maximilian Marterer	7^{10}	6
(Sweden) Elias Ymer	6^{8}	4
WC	(Qatar) Mubarak Al-Harrasi	2	4
6	(Czech Republic) Vít Kopřiva	6	6

Qualifying competition
3	(Germany) Maximilian Marterer	3	1
6	(Czech Republic) Vít Kopřiva	6	6

==== Fourth qualifier ====
First round
4/Alt	(Italy) Fabio Fognini	4	6^{6}
(Bosnia and Herzegovina) Damir Džumhur	6	7^{8}
WC	(Qatar) Rashed Nawaf	4	3
5	(Italy) Giulio Zeppieri	6	6

Qualifying competition
(Bosnia and Herzegovina) Damir Džumhur	5	1
5	(Italy) Giulio Zeppieri	7	6
