= 2015 Fergana Challenger =

- Date: 15–22 June
- Edition: 16th (men); 5th (women)
- Prize money: $50,000 (men) $25,000 (women)
- Surface: Hard
- Location: Fergana, Uzbekistan

Champions

Men's singles
- (Russia) Teymuraz Gabashvili

Women's singles
- (Russia) Anastasiya Komardina

Men's doubles
- (Belarus) Sergey Betov / (Russia) Michail Elgin

Women's doubles
- (India) Sharmada Balu / (Slovenia) Tadeja Majerič
- Fergana Challenger

The 2015 Fergana Challenger was a professional tennis tournament played on hard courts. It was the 16th edition of the tournament for men which was part of the 2015 ATP Challenger Tour, offering a total of $50,000 in prize money, and the fifth edition of the event for women on the 2015 ITF Women's Circuit, offering a total of $25,000 in prize money. It took place in Fergana, Uzbekistan, on 15–22 June 2015.

== Men's singles main draw entrants ==
=== Seeds ===
Country	Player	Rank^{1}	Seed
RUS	Teymuraz Gabashvili	58	1
RUS	Alexander Kudryavtsev	127	2
MDA	Radu Albot	129	3
RUS	Evgeny Donskoy	174	4
BIH	Aldin Šetkić	213	5
TPE	Chen Ti	214	6
RUS	Karen Khachanov	231	7
UKR	Denys Molchanov	274	8

- ^{1} Rankings as of 8 June 2015

=== Other entrants ===
The following players received wildcards into the singles main draw:

- (Uzbekistan) Jurabek Karimov
- (Uzbekistan) Saida'lo Saidkarimov
- (Uzbekistan) Khumoun Sultanov
- (Uzbekistan) Shonigmatjon Shofayziyev

The following players received entry from the qualifying draw:

- (Kyrgyzstan) Daniiar Duldaev
- (Russia) Markos Kalovelonis
- (Russia) Mikhail Ledovskikh
- (Lithuania) Lukas Mugevičius

== Men's doubles main draw entrants ==
=== Seeds ===
Country	Player	Country	Player	Rank^{1}	Seed
BLR	Sergey Betov	BLR	Alexander Bury	280	1
IND	Sriram Balaji	TPE	Chen Ti	344	2
IND	Saketh Myneni	IND	Jeevan Nedunchezhiyan	468	3
RUS	Alexander Kudryavtsev	UKR	Denys Molchanov	665	4

- ^{1} Rankings as of 26 May 2015

=== Other entrants ===
The following pairs received wildcards into the doubles main draw:

- (Uzbekistan) Rizo Saidkhodjaev / (Uzbekistan) Diyor Yuldashev
- (Uzbekistan) Ahad Ermatov / (Uzbekistan) Azizbek Lukmanov
- (Uzbekistan) Rasul Akhmadaliev / (Uzbekistan) Khumoun Sultanov

== Women's singles main draw entrants ==
=== Seeds ===
Country	Player	Rank^{1}	Seed
UZB	Nigina Abduraimova	223	1
JPN	Nao Hibino	234	2
JPN	Hiroko Kuwata	251	3
IND	Ankita Raina	290	4
KAZ	Kamila Kerimbayeva	295	5
JPN	Mari Tanaka	301	6
UZB	Sabina Sharipova	311	7
IND	Prarthana Thombare	355	8

- ^{1} Rankings as of 26 May 2015

=== Other entrants ===
The following players received wildcards into the singles main draw:

- (Uzbekistan) ~~Akgul Amanmuradova~~ (withdrew)
- (Uzbekistan) Shakhnoza Khatamova
- (Uzbekistan) Polina Merenkova
- (Uzbekistan) Sarvinoz Saidhujaeva

The following players received entry from the qualifying draw:

- (Kazakhstan) Kamila Kerimbayeva
- (Russia) Varvara Kuznetsova
- (Ukraine) Katya Malikova
- (Uzbekistan) Amina Mukhametshina
- (Uzbekistan) Gulchekhra Mukhammadsidikova
- (Ukraine) Alisa Tymofeyeva
- (Uzbekistan) Komola Umarova
- (Uzbekistan) Guzal Yusupova

The following player received entry by a lucky loser spot:

- (Uzbekistan) Alina Abdurakhimova

== Women's doubles main draw entrants ==
=== Seeds ===
Country	Player	Country	Player	Rank^{1}	Seed
KAZ	Anna Danilina	RUS	Ekaterina Yashina	584	1
JPN	Hiroko Kuwata	JPN	Mari Tanaka	615	2
KAZ	Kamila Kerimbayeva	RUS	Margarita Lazareva	670	3
JPN	Nao Hibino	IND	Prarthana Thombare	687	4

- ^{1} Rankings as of 26 May 2015

=== Other entrants ===
The following pairs received wildcards into the doubles main draw:

- (Uzbekistan) Shakhnoza Khatamova / (Uzbekistan) Sarvinoz Saidhujaeva
- (Uzbekistan) Polina Merenkova / (Uzbekistan) Komola Umarova
- (Uzbekistan) Amina Mukhametshina / (Uzbekistan) Jamilya Sadykzhanova

== Champions ==
=== Men's singles ===
- (Russia) Teymuraz Gabashvili def. (Russia) Alexander Kudryavtsev 6–2, 1–0 retired

=== Women's singles ===
- (Russia) Anastasiya Komardina def. (Uzbekistan) Sabina Sharipova, 6–2, 1–6, 6–4

=== Men's doubles ===
- (Belarus) Sergey Betov / (Russia) Michail Elgin def. (Ukraine) Denys Molchanov / (Croatia) Franko Škugor 6–3, 7–5

=== Women's doubles ===
- (India) Sharmada Balu / (Slovenia) Tadeja Majerič def. (Uzbekistan) Vlada Ekshibarova / (India) Natasha Palha, 7–5, 6–3
