= 2017 Fergana Challenger =

Professional tennis tournament

- Date: 19–25 June
- Edition: 18th (men); 7th (women)
- Surface: Hard
- Location: Fergana, Uzbekistan

Champions

Men's singles
- (Belarus) Ilya Ivashka

Women's singles
- (Uzbekistan) Sabina Sharipova

Men's doubles
- (India) Sriram Balaji / (India) Vishnu Vardhan

Women's doubles
- (Uzbekistan) Nigina Abduraimova / (Russia) Anastasia Frolova
← 2016 ·	Fergana Challenger	· 2018 →

The 2017 Fergana Challenger was a professional tennis tournament played on hard courts. It was the 18th edition of the tournament for men which was part of the 2017 ATP Challenger Tour, and the seventh edition of the event for women on the 2017 ITF Women's Circuit. It took place in Fergana, Uzbekistan between 19 and 25 June 2017.

== Men's singles main draw entrants ==
=== Seeds ===
Country	Player	Rank^{1}	Seed
SLO	Blaž Kavčič	114	1
KOR	Lee Duck-hee	133	2
SRB	Nikola Milojević	188	3
BLR	Ilya Ivashka	196	4
CAN	Brayden Schnur	245	5
RUS	Alexander Kudryavtsev	260	6
TUR	Cem İlkel	266	7
IND	Prajnesh Gunneswaran	271	8

- ^{1} Rankings as of 12 June 2017.

=== Other entrants ===
The following players received wildcards into the singles main draw:

- (Uzbekistan) Sharobiddin Abzalov
- (Uzbekistan) Saida'Lo Saidkarimov
- (Uzbekistan) Amal Sultanbekov
- (Uzbekistan) Azizkhon Turgunov

The following players received entry from the qualifying draw:

- (Belarus) Sergey Betov
- (Kazakhstan) Timur Khabibulin
- (Russia) Dmitry Surchenko
- (Uzbekistan) Pavel Tsoy

== Women's singles main draw entrants ==
=== Seeds ===
Country	Player	Rank^{1}	Seed
UZB	Sabina Sharipova	152	1
RUS	Ksenia Lykina	222	2
UZB	Nigina Abduraimova	228	3
RUS	Anastasia Frolova	322	4
UKR	Valeriya Strakhova	342	5
KAZ	Kamila Kerimbayeva	358	6
IND	Karman Kaur Thandi	450	7
KAZ	Gozal Ainitdinova	477	8

- ^{1} Rankings as of 12 June 2017.

=== Other entrants ===
The following players received wildcards into the singles main draw:

- (Uzbekistan) Laylo Bakhodirova
- (Kazakhstan) Dariya Detkovskaya
- (Uzbekistan) Shakhnoza Khatamova
- (Uzbekistan) Sarvinoz Saidhujaeva

The following players received entry from the qualifying draw:

- (Uzbekistan) Milena Amedieva
- (India) Prerna Bhambri
- (Russia) Angelina Gabueva
- (Uzbekistan) Yasmina Karimjanova
- (Russia) Varvara Kuznetsova
- (Uzbekistan) Polina Merenkova
- (Uzbekistan) Gulchekhra Mukhammadsidikova
- (Russia) Vera Zvonareva

== Champions ==
=== Men's singles ===
- (Belarus) Ilya Ivashka def. (Serbia) Nikola Milojević 6–4, 6–3.

=== Women's singles ===
- (Uzbekistan) Sabina Sharipova def. (Russia) Elena Rybakina, 6–4, 7–6^{(7–5)}

=== Men's doubles ===
- (India) Sriram Balaji / (India) Vishnu Vardhan def. (Japan) Yuya Kibi / (Japan) Shuichi Sekiguchi 6–3, 6–3.

=== Women's doubles ===
- (Uzbekistan) Nigina Abduraimova / (Russia) Anastasia Frolova def. (Russia) Ksenia Lykina / (Uzbekistan) Sabina Sharipova, 7–6^{(9–7)}, 7–5
