= 2017 Türk Telecom İzmir Cup – Singles =

Singles
- 2017 Türk Telecom İzmir Cup

Final
- Champion: (Ukraine) Illya Marchenko
- Runner-up: (France) Stéphane Robert
- Score: 7–6^{(7–2)}, 6–0

Events
Singles	Doubles
← 2016 ·	Türk Telecom İzmir Cup	· 2018 →

Marsel İlhan was the defending champion but lost in the first round to Illya Marchenko.

Marchenko won the title after defeating Stéphane Robert 7–6^{(7–2)}, 6–0 in the final.

== Seeds ==
1. (Tunisia) Malek Jaziri (first round)
2. (Kazakhstan) Alexander Bublik (quarterfinals)
3. (Ukraine) Sergiy Stakhovsky (second round)
4. (Italy) Matteo Berrettini (quarterfinals)
5. (Italy) Luca Vanni (second round)
6. (Serbia) Nikola Milojević (first round)
7. (Belarus) Uladzimir Ignatik (first round)
8. (Bosnia and Herzegovina) Aldin Šetkić (second round)

== Draw ==
=== Key ===
- Q = Qualifier
- WC = Wild card
- LL = Lucky loser
- Alt = Alternate
- SE = Special exempt
- PR = Protected ranking
- ITF = ITF entry
- JE = Junior exempt
- w/o = Walkover
- r = Retired
- d = Defaulted
- SR = Special ranking

=== Finals ===
Semifinals
(Kazakhstan) Aleksandr Nedovyesov	3	0^{r}
(Ukraine) Illya Marchenko	6	1
(France) Stéphane Robert	6	6
(Serbia) Danilo Petrović	1	4

Final
(Ukraine) Illya Marchenko	7^{7}	6
(France) Stéphane Robert	6^{2}	0

=== Top half ===
First round
1	(Tunisia) M Jaziri	6^{3}	4
(Egypt) K-M Maamoun	7^{7}	6
(Kazakhstan) A Nedovyesov	7^{7}	6
(Bosnia and Herzegovina) M Bašić	6^{5}	2
Q	(Germany) Marc Sieber	6	4	2
Q	(Austria) L Miedler	3	6	6
WC	(Turkey) A Yüksel	6	4	1
5	(Italy) L Vanni	4	6	6
3	(Ukraine) S Stakhovsky	6	7^{7}
(Kazakhstan) D Popko	2	6^{3}
(Ukraine) I Marchenko	1	6	6
(Turkey) M İlhan	6	1	4
WC	(Turkey) A Çelikbilek	6	7
WC	(Turkey) Muhammet Haylaz	4	5
(France) S Doumbia	6	3	6
6	(Serbia) N Milojević	1	6	4

Second round
(Egypt) K-M Maamoun	2	6	1
(Kazakhstan) A Nedovyesov	6	4	6
Q	(Austria) L Miedler	7^{7}	6
5	(Italy) L Vanni	6^{3}	2
3	(Ukraine) S Stakhovsky	6^{4}	3
(Ukraine) I Marchenko	7^{7}	6
WC	(Turkey) A Çelikbilek	5	6	1
(France) S Doumbia	7	3	6

Quarterfinals
(Kazakhstan) A Nedovyesov	6	6
Q	(Austria) L Miedler	2	3
(Ukraine) I Marchenko	6^{3}	6	7^{9}
(France) S Doumbia	7^{7}	2	6^{7}

Semifinals
(Kazakhstan) A Nedovyesov	3	0^{r}
(Ukraine) I Marchenko	6	1

=== Bottom half ===
First round
7	(Belarus) U Ignatik	4	2
(France) S Robert	6	6
(Italy) M Viola	6	6
WC	(Turkey) S Ağabigün	1	0
(Turkey) C İlkel	7^{7}	3	6
(France) M Janvier	6^{4}	6	4
(France) B Bonzi	4	4
4/SE	(Italy) M Berrettini	6	6
8	(Bosnia and Herzegovina) A Šetkić	6	6
LL	(Belarus) Mikalai Haliak	0	3
(Serbia) D Petrović	6^{10}	6	6
(South Africa) L Harris	7^{12}	3	3
Q	(France) Y Jankovits	6	6
(Czech Republic) Marek Jaloviec	1	3
Q	(Germany) R Kern	1	6	4
2/SE	(Kazakhstan) A Bublik	6	3	6

Second round
(France) S Robert	6	6
(Italy) M Viola	4	4
(Turkey) C İlkel	6^{5}	3
4/SE	(Italy) M Berrettini	7^{7}	6
8	(Bosnia and Herzegovina) A Šetkić	6	4	2
(Serbia) D Petrović	1	6	6
Q	(France) Y Jankovits	1	4
2/SE	(Kazakhstan) A Bublik	6	6

Quarterfinals
(France) S Robert	6	7
4/SE	(Italy) M Berrettini	3	5
(Serbia) D Petrović	6	6
2/SE	(Kazakhstan) A Bublik	4	3

Semifinals
(France) S Robert	6	6
(Serbia) D Petrović	1	4
