= 2016 Tashkent Open – Singles =

Singles
- 2016 Tashkent Open

Final
- Champion: (Czech Republic) Kristýna Plíšková
- Runner-up: (Japan) Nao Hibino
- Score: 6–3, 2–6, 6–3

Details
- Draw: 32
- Seeds: 8

Events
Singles	Doubles
- Tashkent Open

Kristýna Plíšková won the title, defeating defending champion Nao Hibino in the final, 6–3, 2–6, 6–3.

== Seeds ==
1. (Sweden) Johanna Larsson (withdrew)
2. (Belgium) Kirsten Flipkens (quarterfinals)
3. (Turkey) Çağla Büyükakçay (first round)
4. (Japan) Nao Hibino (final)
5. (Japan) Kurumi Nara (second round)
6. (Ukraine) Lesia Tsurenko (quarterfinals, retired)
7. (Romania) Sorana Cîrstea (first round)
8. (United Kingdom) Naomi Broady (second round)
9. (Czech Republic) Denisa Allertová (semifinals)

== Draw ==
Key

- Q = Qualifier
- WC = Wild card
- LL = Lucky loser
- Alt = Alternate
- ITF = ITF entry
- PR = Protected ranking
- SR = Special ranking
- SE = Special exempt
- JE = Junior exempt
- JR = Junior Accelerator Programme entrant
- CO = College Accelerator Programme entrant
- NG = Next Gen Accelerator Program entrant
- w/o = Walkover
- r = Retired
- d = Defaulted

=== Finals ===
Semifinals
(Ukraine) Kateryna Kozlova	6^{2}	0
(Czech Republic) Kristýna Plíšková	7^{7}	6
4	(Japan) Nao Hibino	6	6
9	(Czech Republic) Denisa Allertová	2	3

Final
(Czech Republic) Kristýna Plíšková	6	2	6
4	(Japan) Nao Hibino	3	6	3

=== Top half ===
First round
3	(Turkey) Ç Büyükakçay	1	4
LL	(Georgia (country)) S Shapatava	6	6
(Ukraine) K Kozlova	6	7^{7}
WC	(Croatia) D Vekić	1	6^{3}
Q	(Uzbekistan) S Sharipova	5	7	5
(Switzerland) S Vögele	7	5	7
(Italy) F Schiavone	7	6
7	(Romania) S Cîrstea	5	2
5	(Japan) K Nara	7	6
WC	(Ukraine) D Yastremska	5	2
(Czech Republic) Kr Plíšková	6	3	6
(Spain) S Sorribes Tormo	3	6	4
(Russia) I Khromacheva	4	6	6
Q	(Czech Republic) T Martincová	6	3	3
(Switzerland) A Sadiković	4	5
8	(United Kingdom) N Broady	6	7

Second round
LL	(Georgia (country)) S Shapatava	2	5
(Ukraine) K Kozlova	6	7
(Switzerland) S Vögele	6	3
(Italy) F Schiavone	2	2^{r}
5	(Japan) K Nara	2	2
(Czech Republic) Kr Plíšková	6	6
(Russia) I Khromacheva	6	6
8	(United Kingdom) N Broady	2	4

Quarterfinals
(Ukraine) K Kozlova	6	6
(Switzerland) S Vögele	3	3
(Czech Republic) Kr Plíšková	6	6
(Russia) I Khromacheva	3	4

Semifinals
(Ukraine) K Kozlova	6^{2}	0
(Czech Republic) Kr Plíšková	7^{7}	6

=== Bottom half ===
First round
6	(Ukraine) L Tsurenko	6	6
(Russia) E Rodina	0	2
Q	(Turkey) İ Soylu	6	6
(Spain) S Soler Espinosa	0	2
(Japan) R Ozaki	3	6	6
(Bulgaria) E Kostova	6	4	1
WC	(Uzbekistan) K Umarova	3	1
4	(Japan) N Hibino	6	6
9	(Czech Republic) D Allertová	6	6
Q	(Japan) H Kuwata	3	4
(Romania) PM Țig	4	6	6
(Russia) V Diatchenko	6	4	3
(Slovakia) AK Schmiedlová	6	3	4
(Greece) M Sakkari	2	6	6
(Romania) A Bogdan	6^{7}	3
2	(Belgium) K Flipkens	7^{9}	6

Second round
6	(Ukraine) L Tsurenko	6	3	6
Q	(Turkey) İ Soylu	1	6	1
(Japan) R Ozaki	5	1
4	(Japan) N Hibino	7	6
9	(Czech Republic) D Allertová	7	6
(Romania) PM Țig	5	2
(Greece) M Sakkari	6^{0}	6	6^{4}
2	(Belgium) K Flipkens	7^{7}	3	7^{7}

Quarterfinals
6	(Ukraine) L Tsurenko	6^{6}	0^{r}
4	(Japan) N Hibino	7^{8}	0
9	(Czech Republic) D Allertová	7	6
2	(Belgium) K Flipkens	5	4

Semifinals
4	(Japan) N Hibino	6	6
9	(Czech Republic) D Allertová	2	3

== Qualifying ==
=== Seeds ===
1. (Slovakia) Rebecca Šramková (first round)
2. (Russia) Ekaterina Alexandrova (first round)
3. (Japan) Hiroko Kuwata (qualified)
4. (Uzbekistan) Sabina Sharipova (qualified)
5. (Slovenia) Dalila Jakupovič (first round)
6. (Czech Republic) Tereza Martincová (qualified)
7. (Turkey) İpek Soylu (qualified)
8. (Uzbekistan) Nigina Abduraimova (first round)

=== Qualifiers ===
1. (Czech Republic) Tereza Martincová
2. (Turkey) İpek Soylu
3. (Japan) Hiroko Kuwata
4. (Uzbekistan) Sabina Sharipova

=== Lucky loser ===
1. (Georgia (country)) Sofia Shapatava

=== Draw ===
==== First qualifier ====
First round
1	(Slovakia) Rebecca Šramková	1	6^{4}
(Georgia (country)) Sofia Shapatava	6	7^{7}
WC	(Uzbekistan) Laylo Bahodyrova	0	1
6	(Czech Republic) Tereza Martincová	6	6

Qualifying competition
(Georgia (country)) Sofia Shapatava	4	5
6	(Czech Republic) Tereza Martincová	6	7

==== Second qualifier ====
First round
2	(Russia) Ekaterina Alexandrova	6	0	3
(India) Ankita Raina	1	6	6
WC	(Uzbekistan) Arina Folts	1	1
7	(Turkey) İpek Soylu	6	6

Qualifying competition
(India) Ankita Raina	6	1	2
7	(Turkey) İpek Soylu	1	6	6

==== Third qualifier ====
First round
3	(Japan) Hiroko Kuwata	6	0	6
(Ukraine) Lyudmyla Kichenok	4	6	4
(Poland) Katarzyna Piter	6	2	6
8	(Uzbekistan) Nigina Abduraimova	4	6	3

Qualifying competition
3	(Japan) Hiroko Kuwata	6	7^{7}
(Poland) Katarzyna Piter	2	6^{0}

==== Fourth qualifier ====
First round
4	(Uzbekistan) Sabina Sharipova	6	3	6
(Russia) Alexandra Panova	4	6	4
(Ukraine) Anhelina Kalinina	6	7
5	(Slovenia) Dalila Jakupovič	0	5

Qualifying competition
4	(Uzbekistan) Sabina Sharipova	6	6
(Ukraine) Anhelina Kalinina	3	2
