= 2024 Qatar ExxonMobil Open =

- Date: 19–24 February 2024
- Edition: 32nd
- Category: ATP Tour 250 series
- Draw: 28S/16D
- Prize money: $1,395,875
- Surface: Hard / outdoor
- Location: Doha, Qatar
- Venue: Khalifa International Tennis and Squash Complex

Champions

Singles
- Karen Khachanov

Doubles
- (United Kingdom) Jamie Murray / (New Zealand) Michael Venus
- Qatar ExxonMobil Open

The 2024 Qatar Open (also known as 2024 Qatar ExxonMobil Open for sponsorship reasons) was the 32nd edition of the Qatar Open, a men's tennis tournament played on outdoor hard courts. It was part of the ATP Tour 250 tournaments of the 2024 ATP Tour, and took place at the Khalifa International Tennis and Squash Complex in Doha, Qatar from 19 to 24 February 2024.

== Finals ==
=== Singles ===
- Karen Khachanov defeated (Czech Republic) Jakub Menšík 7–6^{(14–12)}, 6–4

=== Doubles ===
- (United Kingdom) Jamie Murray / (New Zealand) Michael Venus defeated (Italy) Lorenzo Musetti / (Italy) Lorenzo Sonego 7–6^{(7–0)}, 2–6, [10–8]

== Singles main-draw entrants ==
=== Seeds ===
Country	Player	Rank^{1}	Seed
	Andrey Rublev	5	1
	Karen Khachanov	17	2
FRA	Ugo Humbert	18	3
KAZ	Alexander Bublik	23	4
ESP	Alejandro Davidovich Fokina	24	5
GER	Jan-Lennard Struff	25	6
ITA	Lorenzo Musetti	26	7
~~NED~~	~~Tallon Griekspoor~~	~~29~~	~~8~~

- ^{1} Rankings are as of 12 February 2024.

=== Other entrants ===
The following players received wildcards into the singles main draw:

- (France) Richard Gasquet
- (France) Gaël Monfils
- (Jordan) Abdullah Shelbayh

The following player received entry into the singles main draw under the ATP Next Gen programme for players aged under 20 and ranked in the top 250:

- (Czech Republic) Jakub Menšík

The following players received entry from the qualifying draw:

- (France) Hugo Grenier
- (Czech Republic) Vít Kopřiva
- (France) Alexandre Müller
- (Italy) Giulio Zeppieri

The following player received entry as a lucky loser:

- (Germany) Maximilian Marterer

=== Withdrawals ===
- (Croatia) Borna Ćorić → replaced by Pavel Kotov
- (Netherlands) Tallon Griekspoor → replaced by (Germany) Maximilian Marterer
- Daniil Medvedev → replaced by (Spain) Roberto Bautista Agut
- (Spain) Rafael Nadal → replaced by (Netherlands) Botic van de Zandschulp

== Doubles main-draw entrants ==
=== Seeds ===
Country	Player	Country	Player	Rank^{1}	Seed
GBR	Jamie Murray	NZL	Michael Venus	41	1
USA	Nathaniel Lammons	USA	Jackson Withrow	41	2
FRA	Nicolas Mahut	FRA	Édouard Roger-Vasselin	45	3
BEL	Sander Gillé	BEL	Joran Vliegen	46	4

- ^{1} Rankings are as of 12 February 2024.

=== Other entrants ===
The following pairs received wildcards into the doubles main draw:

- (Spain) Roberto Bautista Agut / (Qatar) Mubarak Al-Harrasi
- (Tunisia) Skander Mansouri / (Qatar) Rashed Nawaf

The following pair received entry as alternates:

- (Germany) Andreas Mies / (Australia) John-Patrick Smith

=== Withdrawals ===
- (Kazakhstan) Alexander Bublik / (Netherlands) Botic van de Zandschulp → replaced by (Germany) Andreas Mies / (Australia) John-Patrick Smith
