= 2015 Fergana Challenger – Men's singles =

Men's singles
- 2015 Fergana Challenger

Final
- Champion: (Russia) Teymuraz Gabashvili
- Runner-up: (Russia) Alexander Kudryavtsev
- Score: 6–2, 1–0 retired

Events
Singles	men	women
Doubles	men	women
- Fergana Challenger

Blaž Kavčič was the defending champion but decided not to participate.

Teymuraz Gabashvili won the tournament, after Alexander Kudryavtsev retiring in the final.

== Seeds ==
1. (Russia) Teymuraz Gabashvili (champion)
2. (Russia) Alexander Kudryavtsev (final, retired)
3. (Moldova) Radu Albot (semifinals)
4. (Russia) Evgeny Donskoy (second round)
5. (Bosnia and Herzegovina) Aldin Šetkić (quarterfinals)
6. (Chinese Taipei) Chen Ti (semifinals)
7. (Russia) Karen Khachanov (quarterfinals)
8. (Ukraine) Denys Molchanov (quarterfinals)

== Draw ==
Key

- Q = Qualifier
- WC = Wild card
- LL = Lucky loser
- Alt = Alternate
- ITF = ITF entry
- PR = Protected ranking
- SR = Special ranking
- SE = Special exempt
- JE = Junior exempt
- JR = Junior Accelerator Programme entrant
- CO = College Accelerator Programme entrant
- NG = Next Gen Accelerator Program entrant
- w/o = Walkover
- r = Retired
- d = Defaulted

=== Finals ===
Semifinals
1	(Russia) Teymuraz Gabashvili	6	6
6	(Chinese Taipei) Chen Ti	2	4
3	(Moldova) Radu Albot	6^{3}	6	6^{6}
2	(Russia) Alexander Kudryavtsev	7^{7}	4	7^{8}

Final
1	(Russia) Teymuraz Gabashvili	6	1
2	(Russia) Alexander Kudryavtsev	2	0^{r}

=== Top half ===
First round
1	(Russia) T Gabashvili	6	6
(India) J Nedunchezhiyan	2	4
WC	(Uzbekistan) Saida'lo Saidkarimov	2	1
(Belarus) Y Shyla	6	6
(Uzbekistan) T Ismailov	7^{7}	6
Q	(Russia) M Kalovelonis	6^{1}	2
(Russia) D Matsukevich	3	1
7	(Russia) K Khachanov	6	6
4	(Russia) E Donskoy	4	6	6
(Chinese Taipei) C Wang	6	3	3
Q	(Russia) M Ledovskikh	4	6^{5}
(Serbia) N Milojević	6	7^{7}
(Serbia) M Tepavac	3	2
(Lithuania) L Grigelis	6	6
WC	(Uzbekistan) J Karimov	0	3
6	(Chinese Taipei) T Chen	6	6

Second round
1	(Russia) T Gabashvili	6^{4}	6	6
(Belarus) Y Shyla	7^{7}	3	1
(Uzbekistan) T Ismailov	6^{5}	2
7	(Russia) K Khachanov	7^{7}	6
4	(Russia) E Donskoy	1	4
(Serbia) N Milojević	6	6
(Lithuania) L Grigelis	3	3
6	(Chinese Taipei) T Chen	6	6

Quarterfinals
1	(Russia) T Gabashvili	3	6	6
7	(Russia) K Khachanov	6	3	4
(Serbia) N Milojević	6^{4}	7	4
6	(Chinese Taipei) T Chen	7^{7}	5	6

Semifinals
1	(Russia) T Gabashvili	6	6
6	(Chinese Taipei) T Chen	2	4

=== Bottom half ===
First round
8	(Ukraine) D Molchanov	6	6
(Japan) T Niki	4	2
Q	(Kyrgyzstan) D Duldaev	1	6^{4}
(South Korea) D Lee	6	7^{7}
(El Salvador) M Arévalo	6	4	6^{2}
(Croatia) F Škugor	4	6	7^{7}
Q	(Lithuania) L Mugevičius	2	3
3	(Moldova) R Albot	6	6
5	(Bosnia and Herzegovina) A Šetkić	6	6
WC	(Uzbekistan) Shonigmatjon Shofayziyev	3	1
(South Africa) R Roelofse	7	7^{7}
WC	(Uzbekistan) K Sultanov	5	6^{4}
(Switzerland) A Bossel	7^{8}	3	6
(Belarus) I Ivashka	6^{6}	6	4
(Russia) M Elgin	6^{2}	4
2	(Russia) A Kudryavtsev	7^{7}	6

Second round
8	(Ukraine) D Molchanov	3	7^{7}	3
(South Korea) D Lee	6	6^{5}	0^{r}
(Croatia) F Škugor	6	6^{3}	4
3	(Moldova) R Albot	4	7^{7}	6
5	(Bosnia and Herzegovina) A Šetkić	6	7^{7}
(South Africa) R Roelofse	3	6^{2}
(Switzerland) A Bossel	7^{7}	5	6^{5}
2	(Russia) A Kudryavtsev	6^{2}	7	7^{7}

Quarterfinals
8	(Ukraine) D Molchanov	4	1
3	(Moldova) R Albot	6	6
5	(Bosnia and Herzegovina) A Šetkić	7^{7}	5	6^{6}
2	(Russia) A Kudryavtsev	6^{3}	7	7^{8}

Semifinals
3	(Moldova) R Albot	6^{3}	6	6^{6}
2	(Russia) A Kudryavtsev	7^{7}	4	7^{8}
