= 2015 Tashkent Open – Singles =

Singles
- 2015 Tashkent Open

Final
- Champion: (Japan) Nao Hibino
- Runner-up: (Croatia) Donna Vekić
- Score: 6–2, 6–2

Details
- Draw: 32
- Seeds: 8

Events
Singles	Doubles
- Tashkent Open

Karin Knapp was the defending champion but chose not to enter the tournament this year.
Nao Hibino won the title, defeating Donna Vekić in the final, 6–2, 6–2.

== Seeds ==
1. (Germany) Annika Beck (quarterfinals)
2. (Germany) Carina Witthöft (second round)
3. (Slovenia) Polona Hercog (first round)
4. (Sweden) Johanna Larsson (quarterfinals)
5. (Czech Republic) Kateřina Siniaková (second round)
6. (Russia) Margarita Gasparyan (second round)
7. (Latvia) Jeļena Ostapenko (first round)
8. (Romania) Andreea Mitu (first round)

== Draw ==
Key

- Q = Qualifier
- WC = Wild card
- LL = Lucky loser
- Alt = Alternate
- ITF = ITF entry
- PR = Protected ranking
- SR = Special ranking
- SE = Special exempt
- JE = Junior exempt
- JR = Junior Accelerator Programme entrant
- CO = College Accelerator Programme entrant
- NG = Next Gen Accelerator Program entrant
- w/o = Walkover
- r = Retired
- d = Defaulted

=== Finals ===
Semifinals
(Serbia) Bojana Jovanovski	3	4
(Japan) Nao Hibino	6	6
(Russia) Evgeniya Rodina	5	1
(Croatia) Donna Vekić	7	6

Final
(Japan) Nao Hibino	6	6
(Croatia) Donna Vekić	2	2

=== Top half ===
First round
1	(Germany) A Beck	6	6
(Russia) E Kulichkova	3	1
WC	(Uzbekistan) S Sharipova	2	1
(Slovakia) J Čepelová	6	6
Q	(Estonia) A Kontaveit	2	4
(Serbia) A Krunić	6	6
(Serbia) B Jovanovski	4	6	7
7	(Latvia) J Ostapenko	6	2	5
3	(Slovenia) P Hercog	6	3	3
(Belarus) A Sasnovich	4	6	6
WC	(Ukraine) A Kalinina	4	4
(Japan) N Hibino	6	6
(Czech Republic) K Koukalová	4	0
Q	(Ukraine) K Kozlova	6	6
Q	(Poland) P Kania	2	6^{5}
5	(Czech Republic) K Siniaková	6	7^{7}

Second round
1	(Germany) A Beck	6	6
(Slovakia) J Čepelová	4	4
(Serbia) A Krunić	4	3
(Serbia) B Jovanovski	6	6
(Belarus) A Sasnovich
(Japan) N Hibino	w/o
Q	(Ukraine) K Kozlova	7^{7}	6
5	(Czech Republic) K Siniaková	6^{4}	3

Quarterfinals
1	(Germany) A Beck	6	5	3
(Serbia) B Jovanovski	2	7	6
(Japan) N Hibino	6	6
Q	(Ukraine) K Kozlova	3	3

Semifinals
(Serbia) B Jovanovski	3	4
(Japan) N Hibino	6	6

=== Bottom half ===
First round
8	(Romania) A Mitu	5	3
(Kazakhstan) Y Shvedova	7	6
(Russia) E Rodina	6	6
(Poland) U Radwańska	2	4
LL	(Croatia) P Martić	4	0
WC	(Uzbekistan) N Abduraimova	6	6
Q	(Switzerland) S Vögele	3	3
4	(Sweden) J Larsson	6	6
6	(Russia) M Gasparyan	7^{7}	6
(Russia) A Panova	6^{2}	1
(Russia) E Vesnina	2	7	5
(Germany) A-L Friedsam	6	5	7
(Netherlands) K Bertens	3	6	3
(Croatia) D Vekić	6	1	6
(Czech Republic) Kr Plíšková	6	4	3
2	(Germany) C Witthöft	4	6	6

Second round
(Kazakhstan) Y Shvedova	4	6^{4}
(Russia) E Rodina	6	7^{7}
WC	(Uzbekistan) N Abduraimova	2	2
4	(Sweden) J Larsson	6	6
6	(Russia) M Gasparyan	3	4
(Germany) A-L Friedsam	6	6
(Croatia) D Vekić	4	6	6
2	(Germany) C Witthöft	6	2	2

Quarterfinals
(Russia) E Rodina	6	5	6
4	(Sweden) J Larsson	3	7	0
(Germany) A-L Friedsam	6	3	5
(Croatia) D Vekić	3	6	7

Semifinals
(Russia) E Rodina	5	1
(Croatia) D Vekić	7	6

== Qualifying ==
=== Seeds ===
1. (Estonia) Anett Kontaveit (qualified)
2. (Croatia) Petra Martić (qualifying competition, lucky loser)
3. (Switzerland) Stefanie Vögele (qualified)
4. (Poland) Paula Kania (qualified)
5. (Ukraine) Maryna Zanevska (qualifying competition, withdrew)
6. (Spain) Sara Sorribes Tormo (first round)
7. (Poland) Katarzyna Piter (qualifying competition)
8. (Russia) Ekaterina Bychkova (qualifying competition)

=== Qualifiers ===
1. (Estonia) Anett Kontaveit
2. (Ukraine) Kateryna Kozlova
3. (Switzerland) Stefanie Vögele
4. (Poland) Paula Kania

=== Lucky losers ===
1. (Croatia) Petra Martić

=== Draw ===
==== First qualifier ====
First round
1	(Estonia) Anett Kontaveit	6	7^{7}
(Belarus) Lidziya Marozava	4	6^{1}
(Uzbekistan) Akgul Amanmuradova	2	5
7	(Poland) Katarzyna Piter	6	7

Qualifying competition
1	(Estonia) Anett Kontaveit	7^{11}	4	6
7	(Poland) Katarzyna Piter	6^{9}	6	3

==== Second qualifier ====
First round
2	(Croatia) Petra Martić	6	6
(Russia) Vera Dushevina	4	3
(Ukraine) Kateryna Kozlova	6	7
6	(Spain) Sara Sorribes Tormo	0	5

Qualifying competition
2	(Croatia) Petra Martić	1	3
(Ukraine) Kateryna Kozlova	6	6

==== Third qualifier ====
First round
3	(Switzerland) Stefanie Vögele	6	6
WC	(Uzbekistan) Vlada Ekshibarova	1	3
(Germany) Carolin Daniels	3	6	2
8	(Russia) Ekaterina Bychkova	6	3	6

Qualifying competition
3	(Switzerland) Stefanie Vögele	7	2	6
8	(Russia) Ekaterina Bychkova	5	6	4

==== Fourth qualifier ====
First round
4	(Poland) Paula Kania	6	6
(Georgia (country)) Oksana Kalashnikova	2	1
WC	(Uzbekistan) Arina Folts	1	3
5	(Ukraine) Maryna Zanevska	6	6

Qualifying competition
4	(Poland) Paula Kania	w/o
5	(Ukraine) Maryna Zanevska
