= 2015 Tashkent Open =

- Date: September 28 – October 3
- Edition: 17th
- Category: WTA International
- Draw: 32S / 16D
- Prize money: $250,000
- Surface: Hard
- Location: Tashkent, Uzbekistan
- Venue: Tashkent Tennis Center

Champions

Singles
- (Japan) Nao Hibino

Doubles
- (Russia) Margarita Gasparyan / (Russia) Alexandra Panova
← 2014 ·	Tashkent Open	· 2016 →

The 2015 Tashkent Open was a WTA International women's tennis tournament played on outdoor hard courts. It was the 17th edition of the Tashkent Open, on the 2015 WTA Tour. It took place at the Tashkent Tennis Center in Tashkent, Uzbekistan, between September 28 and October 3, 2015. Unseeded Nao Hibino won the singles title.

== Finals ==
=== Singles ===
(Japan) Nao Hibino defeated (Croatia) Donna Vekić, 6–2, 6–2

- It was Hibino's only singles title of the year and the 1st of her career.

=== Doubles ===
(Russia) Margarita Gasparyan / (Russia) Alexandra Panova defeated (Russia) Vera Dushevina / (Czech Republic) Kateřina Siniaková, 6–1, 3–6, [10–3]

== Points and prize money ==
=== Point distribution ===
Event	W	F	SF	QF	Round of 16	Round of 32	Q	Q2	Q1
Singles	280	180	110	60	30	1	18	12	1
Doubles	280	180	110	60	1	—	—	—	—

=== Prize money ===
Event	W	F	SF	QF	Round of 16	Round of 32^{1}	Q2	Q1
Singles	$43,000	$21,400	$11,500	$6,200	$3,420	$2,220	$1,285	$750
Doubles	$12,300	$6,400	$3,435	$1,820	$960	—	—	—
Doubles prize money per team

_{^{1} Qualifiers prize money is also the Round of 32 prize money}

== Singles main-draw entrants ==
Country	Player	Rank^{1}	Seed
GER	Annika Beck	43	1
GER	Carina Witthöft	55	2
SLO	Polona Hercog	60	3
SWE	Johanna Larsson	61	4
CZE	Kateřina Siniaková	69	5
RUS	Margarita Gasparyan	70	6
LAT	Jeļena Ostapenko	77	7
ROU	Andreea Mitu	84	8

- ^{1} Rankings as of September 21, 2015

=== Other entrants ===
The following players received wildcards into the singles main draw:

- (Uzbekistan) Nigina Abduraimova
- (Ukraine) Anhelina Kalinina
- (Uzbekistan) Sabina Sharipova

The following players received entry from the qualifying draw:

- (Poland) Paula Kania
- (Estonia) Anett Kontaveit
- (Ukraine) Kateryna Kozlova
- (Switzerland) Stefanie Vögele

The following player received entry as a lucky loser:

- (Croatia) Petra Martić

=== Withdrawals ===
Before the tournament

- (Czech Republic) Denisa Allertová (abdominal strain) → replaced by (Croatia) Petra Martić
- (Russia) Vitalia Diatchenko → replaced by (Russia) Elena Vesnina
- (New Zealand) Marina Erakovic → replaced by (Netherlands) Kiki Bertens
- (Belgium) Kirsten Flipkens → replaced by (Czech Republic) Kristýna Plíšková
- (Germany) Tatjana Maria → replaced by (Slovakia) Jana Čepelová
- (Japan) Kurumi Nara → replaced by (Latvia) Jeļena Ostapenko
- (Czech Republic) Tereza Smitková → replaced by (Belarus) Aliaksandra Sasnovich
- (Belgium) Yanina Wickmayer → replaced by (Japan) Nao Hibino

During the tournament

- (Belarus) Aliaksandra Sasnovich (Lower Back Injury)

== Doubles main-draw entrants ==
=== Seeds ===
Country	Player	Country	Player	Rank^{1}	Seed
~~NED~~	~~Kiki Bertens~~	~~SWE~~	~~Johanna Larsson~~	~~80~~	~~1~~
RUS	Margarita Gasparyan	RUS	Alexandra Panova	125	2
GBR	Jocelyn Rae	GBR	Anna Smith	158	3
GEO	Oksana Kalashnikova	POL	Paula Kania	164	4

- ^{1} Rankings as of September 21, 2015

=== Other entrants ===
The following pairs received wildcards into the doubles main draw:

- (Uzbekistan) Nigina Abduraimova / (Uzbekistan) Akgul Amanmuradova
- (Russia) Ekaterina Bychkova / (Switzerland) Stefanie Vögele

The following pair received entry as alternates:

- (Ukraine) Alona Fomina / (Ukraine) Kateryna Kozlova

=== Withdrawals ===
Before the tournament

- (Netherlands) Kiki Bertens (Left Foot/Heel Injury)

=== Retirements ===
- (Germany) Anna-Lena Friedsam (Abdominal Injury)
