= 2015 Fergana Challenger – Men's doubles =

Men's doubles
- 2015 Fergana Challenger

Final
- Champions: (Belarus) Sergey Betov (Russia) Michail Elgin
- Runners-up: (Ukraine) Denys Molchanov (Croatia) Franko Škugor
- Score: 6–3, 7–5

Events
| Singles | men | women |
| Doubles | men | women |
- Fergana Challenger

Sergey Betov and Alexander Bury were the defending champions, but Bury decided not to participate. Betov teamed up with Michail Elgin and successfully defended the title, beating Denys Molchanov and Franko Škugor in the final, 6–3, 7–5.

== Seeds ==
1. (Belarus) Sergey Betov / (Russia) Michail Elgin (champions)
2. (Moldova) Radu Albot / (Russia) Alexander Kudryavtsev (quarterfinals)
3. (Chinese Taipei) Chen Ti / (India) Jeevan Nedunchezhiyan (quarterfinals)
4. (Ukraine) Denys Molchanov / (Croatia) Franko Škugor (final)

== Draw ==
Key

- Q = Qualifier
- WC = Wild card
- LL = Lucky loser
- Alt = Alternate
- ITF = ITF entry
- PR = Protected ranking
- SR = Special ranking
- SE = Special exempt
- JE = Junior exempt
- JR = Junior Accelerator Programme entrant
- CO = College Accelerator Programme entrant
- NG = Next Gen Accelerator Program entrant
- w/o = Walkover
- r = Retired
- d = Defaulted

=== Draw ===
First round
1 | (Belarus) S Betov (Russia) M Elgin | 6 | 6
WC | (Uzbekistan) K Sultanov (Uzbekistan) Pavel Tsoy | 0 | 2
(El Salvador) M Arévalo (Belarus) I Ivashka | 4 | 5
WC | (Uzbekistan) S Fayziev (Uzbekistan) D Karimov | 6 | 7
3 | (Chinese Taipei) T Chen (India) J Nedunchezhiyan | 6 | 6
WC | (Uzbekistan) Rizo Saidkhodjaev (Uzbekistan) Diyor Yuldashev | 0 | 0
(Serbia) N Milojević (Serbia) M Tepavac | 6 | 7
(Switzerland) A Bossel (Bosnia and Herzegovina) A Šetkić | 4 | 5
(Russia) T Gabashvili (Russia) D Matsukevich | 3 | 7^{7} | [10]
(Uzbekistan) T Ismailov (Uzbekistan) Shonigmatjon Shofayziyev | 6 | 6^{5} | [8]
(Russia) M Kalovelonis (Chinese Taipei) C Wang | 2 | 6^{3}
4 | (Ukraine) D Molchanov (Croatia) F Škugor | 6 | 7^{7}
(South Africa) D O'Brien (South Africa) R Roelofse | 7^{7} | 6^{7} | [10]
(Belarus) Y Shyla (Belarus) A Vasilevski | 6^{5} | 7^{9} | [7]
(Lithuania) L Grigelis (Lithuania) L Mugevičius | 7^{7} | 2 | [6]
2 | (Moldova) R Albot (Russia) A Kudryavtsev | 6^{3} | 6 | [10]

Quarterfinals
1 | (Belarus) S Betov (Russia) M Elgin | 6 | 6
WC | (Uzbekistan) S Fayziev (Uzbekistan) D Karimov | 1 | 0
3 | (Chinese Taipei) T Chen (India) J Nedunchezhiyan | 2 | 4
(Serbia) N Milojević (Serbia) M Tepavac | 6 | 6
(Russia) T Gabashvili (Russia) D Matsukevich | 7^{10} | 4 | [9]
4 | (Ukraine) D Molchanov (Croatia) F Škugor | 6^{8} | 6 | [11]
(South Africa) D O'Brien (South Africa) R Roelofse | 7^{7} | 6
2 | (Moldova) R Albot (Russia) A Kudryavtsev | 6^{4} | 1

Semifinals
1 | (Belarus) S Betov (Russia) M Elgin | 6 | 6
(Serbia) N Milojević (Serbia) M Tepavac | 1 | 1
4 | (Ukraine) D Molchanov (Croatia) F Škugor | 6 | 6
(South Africa) D O'Brien (South Africa) R Roelofse | 3 | 3

Final
1 | (Belarus) S Betov (Russia) M Elgin | 6 | 7
4 | (Ukraine) D Molchanov (Croatia) F Škugor | 3 | 5
