= 2016 Fergana Challenger – Men's doubles =

Men's doubles
- 2016 Fergana Challenger

Final
- Champions: (France) Yannick Jankovits (Switzerland) Luca Margaroli
- Runners-up: (Japan) Toshihide Matsui (India) Vishnu Vardhan
- Score: 6–4, 7–6^{(7–4)}

Events
Singles	men	women
Doubles	men	women
- Fergana Challenger

Sergey Betov and Mikhail Elgin were the defending champions, but Betov did not participate. Elgin instead partnered Denys Molchanov. Elgin and Molchanov lost in the quarterfinals to Toshihide Matsui and Vishnu Vardhan.

Yannick Jankovits and Luca Margaroli won the title after defeating Toshihide Matsui and Vishnu Vardhan 6–4, 7–6^{(7–4)} in the final.

== Seeds ==
1. (Russia) Mikhail Elgin / (Ukraine) Denys Molchanov (quarterfinals)
2. (Chinese Taipei) Chen Ti / (Russia) Denis Matsukevich (first round)
3. (Belarus) Yaraslav Shyla / (Belarus) Andrei Vasilevski (semifinals)
4. (France) Yannick Jankovits / (Switzerland) Luca Margaroli (champions)

== Draw ==
Key

- Q = Qualifier
- WC = Wild card
- LL = Lucky loser
- Alt = Alternate
- ITF = ITF entry
- PR = Protected ranking
- SR = Special ranking
- SE = Special exempt
- JE = Junior exempt
- JR = Junior Accelerator Programme entrant
- CO = College Accelerator Programme entrant
- NG = Next Gen Accelerator Program entrant
- w/o = Walkover
- r = Retired
- d = Defaulted

First round
1	(Russia) M Elgin (Ukraine) D Molchanov	6	6
(Russia) M Kalovelonis (Belarus) D Zhyrmont	2	3
(France) S Doumbia (Czech Republic) Michal Konečný	6^{9}	7^{7}	[8]
(Japan) T Matsui (India) V Vardhan	7^{11}	6^{3}	[10]
3	(Belarus) Y Shyla (Belarus) A Vasilevski	6	6
(Russia) A Vatutin (Russia) A Zaitcev	1	1
(Serbia) N Milojević (Serbia) D Petrović	6	3	[9]
Alt	(Belgium) J Cagnina (Belgium) Julien Dubail	2	6	[11]
(Belarus) I Ivashka (Russia) A Kudryavtsev	6^{6}	6	[10]
(Serbia) M Janković (Spain) R Ortega Olmedo	7^{8}	3	[5]
WC	(Uzbekistan) S Fayziev (Uzbekistan) J Karimov	4	6	[11]
4	(France) Y Jankovits (Switzerland) L Margaroli	6	0	[13]
WC	(Uzbekistan) T Ismailov (Kazakhstan) T Khabibulin	6^{2}	6	[7]
WC	(Uzbekistan) Shonigmatjon Shofayziyev (Uzbekistan) K Sultanov	7^{7}	3	[10]
(Republic of Ireland) S Barry (Switzerland) A Bossel	2	7^{7}	[10]
2	(Chinese Taipei) T Chen (Russia) D Matsukevich	6	6^{1}	[5]

Quarterfinals
1	(Russia) M Elgin (Ukraine) D Molchanov	6^{4}	6^{5}
(Japan) T Matsui (India) V Vardhan	7^{7}	7^{7}
3	(Belarus) Y Shyla (Belarus) A Vasilevski	7^{7}	6
Alt	(Belgium) J Cagnina (Belgium) J Dubail	6^{3}	3
(Belarus) I Ivashka (Russia) A Kudryavtsev
4	(France) Y Jankovits (Switzerland) L Margaroli	w/o
WC	(Uzbekistan) S Shofayziyev (Uzbekistan) K Sultanov	w/o
(Republic of Ireland) S Barry (Switzerland) A Bossel

Semifinals
(Japan) T Matsui (India) V Vardhan	7^{7}	3	[10]
3	(Belarus) Y Shyla (Belarus) A Vasilevski	6^{2}	6	[5]
4	(France) Y Jankovits (Switzerland) L Margaroli	7^{7}	4	[11]
WC	(Uzbekistan) S Shofayziyev (Uzbekistan) K Sultanov	6^{4}	6	[9]

Final
(Japan) T Matsui (India) V Vardhan	4	6^{4}
4	(France) Y Jankovits (Switzerland) L Margaroli	6	7^{7}
