= 2017 Tashkent Open =

- Date: September 25–30
- Edition: 19th
- Category: WTA International
- Draw: 32S / 16D
- Prize money: $250,000
- Surface: Hard
- Location: Tashkent, Uzbekistan
- Venue: Olympic Tennis School

Champions

Singles
- (Ukraine) Kateryna Bondarenko

Doubles
- (Hungary) Tímea Babos / (Czech Republic) Andrea Hlaváčková
← 2016 ·	Tashkent Open	· 2018 →

The 2017 Tashkent Open was a WTA International tennis tournament played on outdoor hard courts. It was the 19th edition of the Tashkent Open, on the 2017 WTA Tour. It took place at the Olympic Tennis School in Tashkent, Uzbekistan, between September 25 and 30, 2017.

== Finals ==
=== Singles ===
(Ukraine) Kateryna Bondarenko defeated (Hungary) Tímea Babos, 6–4, 6–4

- It was Bondarenko's only singles title of the year and the 2nd of her career.

=== Doubles ===
(Hungary) Tímea Babos / (Czech Republic) Andrea Hlaváčková defeated (Japan) Nao Hibino / (Georgia (country)) Oksana Kalashnikova, 7–5, 6–4

== Points and prize money ==
=== Point distribution ===
Event	W	F	SF	QF	Round of 16	Round of 32	Q	Q2	Q1
Singles	280	180	110	60	30	1	18	12	1
Doubles	280	180	110	60	1	—	—	—	—

=== Prize money ===
Event	W	F	SF	QF	Round of 16	Round of 32^{1}	Q2	Q1
Singles	$43,000	$21,400	$11,500	$6,200	$3,420	$2,220	$1,285	$750
Doubles	$12,300	$6,400	$3,435	$1,820	$960	—	—	—
Doubles prize money per team

_{^{1} Qualifiers prize money is also the round of 32 prize money}

== Singles main-draw entrants ==
=== Seeds ===
Country	Player	Rank^{1}	Seed
CZE	Kristýna Plíšková	42	1
HUN	Tímea Babos	53	2
GER	Tatjana Maria	54	3
ROU	Irina-Camelia Begu	55	4
CZE	Markéta Vondroušová	64	5
SRB	Aleksandra Krunić	65	6
JPN	Nao Hibino	72	7
RUS	Ekaterina Alexandrova	75	8

- ^{1} Rankings as of September 18, 2017

=== Other entrants ===
The following players received wildcards into the singles main draw:

- (Uzbekistan) Nigina Abduraimova
- (Uzbekistan) Akgul Amanmuradova
- (Uzbekistan) Sabina Sharipova

The following players received entry using protected rankings:

- (Russia) Vitalia Diatchenko
- (Japan) Misa Eguchi
- (Switzerland) Stefanie Vögele

The following players received entry from the qualifying draw:

- (Australia) Lizette Cabrera
- (Croatia) Jana Fett
- (Russia) Irina Khromacheva
- (Russia) Vera Zvonareva

=== Withdrawals ===
Before the tournament

- (United States) Julia Boserup → replaced by (Ukraine) Kateryna Kozlova
- (Belgium) Kirsten Flipkens → replaced by (Switzerland) Stefanie Vögele

=== Retirements ===
- (Russia) Vera Zvonareva

== Doubles main-draw entrants ==
=== Seeds ===
Country	Player	Country	Player	Rank^{1}	Seed
HUN	Tímea Babos	CZE	Andrea Hlaváčková	24	1
JPN	Nao Hibino	GEO	Oksana Kalashnikova	125	2
UKR	Kateryna Bondarenko	SRB	Aleksandra Krunić	146	3
RUS	Irina Khromacheva	TUR	İpek Soylu	170	4

- ^{1} Rankings as of September 18, 2017

=== Other entrants ===
The following pairs received wildcards into the doubles main draw:

- (Uzbekistan) Olesya Kim / (Uzbekistan) Sevil Yuldasheva
- (Czech Republic) Kristýna Plíšková / (Uzbekistan) Iroda Tulyaganova

=== Withdrawals ===
During the tournament

- (Russia) Evgeniya Rodina
