= 2017 Fergana Challenger – Men's singles =

Men's singles
- 2017 Fergana Challenger

Final
- Champion: (Belarus) Ilya Ivashka
- Runner-up: (Serbia) Nikola Milojević
- Score: 6–4, 6–3

Events
Singles	men	women
Doubles	men	women
- Fergana Challenger

Radu Albot was the defending champion but chose not to defend his title.

Ilya Ivashka won the title after defeating Nikola Milojević 6–4, 6–3 in the final.

== Seeds ==
1. (Slovenia) Blaž Kavčič (semifinals)
2. (South Korea) Lee Duck-hee (first round)
3. (Serbia) Nikola Milojević (final)
4. (Belarus) Ilya Ivashka (champion)
5. (Canada) Brayden Schnur (quarterfinals)
6. (Russia) Alexander Kudryavtsev (first round)
7. (Turkey) Cem İlkel (quarterfinals)
8. (India) Prajnesh Gunneswaran (quarterfinals)

== Draw ==
Key

- Q = Qualifier
- WC = Wild card
- LL = Lucky loser
- Alt = Alternate
- ITF = ITF entry
- PR = Protected ranking
- SR = Special ranking
- SE = Special exempt
- JE = Junior exempt
- JR = Junior Accelerator Programme entrant
- CO = College Accelerator Programme entrant
- NG = Next Gen Accelerator Program entrant
- w/o = Walkover
- r = Retired
- d = Defaulted

=== Finals ===
Semifinals
1	(Slovenia) Blaž Kavčič	4	3
4	(Belarus) Ilya Ivashka	6	6
3	(Serbia) Nikola Milojević	6	6
(Israel) Edan Leshem	2	1

Final
4	(Belarus) Ilya Ivashka	6	6
3	(Serbia) Nikola Milojević	4	3

=== Top half ===
First round
1	(Slovenia) B Kavčič	6^{4}	6	6
(Japan) Yuya Kibi	7^{7}	0	0
(United States) S Bangoura	6	6
Q	(Russia) Dmitry Surchenko	1	2
Q	(Kazakhstan) T Khabibulin	4	6	6
WC	(Uzbekistan) Amal Sultanbekov	6	4	3
WC	(Uzbekistan) Azizkhon Turgunov	0	4
7	(Turkey) C İlkel	6	6
4	(Belarus) I Ivashka	6	6
Q	(Uzbekistan) Pavel Tsoy	0	2
(Japan) Shuichi Sekiguchi	6	3	7
(Ukraine) V Manafov	4	6	5
(Russia) A Yakovlev	3	1
(Uzbekistan) S Fomin	6	6
(India) S Balaji	5	3
5	(Canada) B Schnur	7	6

Second round
1	(Slovenia) B Kavčič	6	5	6
(United States) S Bangoura	2	7	2
Q	(Kazakhstan) T Khabibulin	3	2
7	(Turkey) C İlkel	6	6
4	(Belarus) I Ivashka	6	6
(Japan) S Sekiguchi	2	2
(Uzbekistan) S Fomin	1	3
5	(Canada) B Schnur	6	6

Quarterfinals
1	(Slovenia) B Kavčič	4	6	6
7	(Turkey) C İlkel	6	4	0
4	(Belarus) I Ivashka	6	6
5	(Canada) B Schnur	2	1

Semifinals
1	(Slovenia) B Kavčič	4	3
4	(Belarus) I Ivashka	6	6

=== Bottom half ===
First round
6	(Russia) A Kudryavtsev	6	4	6^{4}
(Poland) H Hurkacz	4	6	7^{7}
(Kyrgyzstan) D Duldaev	6	6
WC	(Uzbekistan) Saida'Lo Saidkarimov	2	1
(Uzbekistan) F Dustov	6	1^{r}
(Uzbekistan) S Fayziev	4	2
WC	(Uzbekistan) Sharobiddin Abzalov	0	4
3	(Serbia) N Milojević	6	6
8	(India) P Gunneswaran	6	6
Q	(Belarus) S Betov	2	4
(Egypt) K-M Maamoun	6^{5}	6	3
(Belarus) Y Shyla	7^{7}	3	6
(Israel) E Leshem	4
(Uzbekistan) T Ismailov	0^{r}
(India) V Vardhan	6^{4}	6	7^{7}
2	(South Korea) D-h Lee	7^{7}	2	6^{4}

Second round
(Poland) H Hurkacz	6	4	6
(Kyrgyzstan) D Duldaev	2	6	3
(Uzbekistan) S Fayziev	7^{8}	3	6^{4}
3	(Serbia) N Milojević	6^{6}	6	7^{7}
8	(India) P Gunneswaran	6	3
(Belarus) Y Shyla	4	1^{r}
(Israel) E Leshem	1	6	6
(India) V Vardhan	6	4	4

Quarterfinals
(Poland) H Hurkacz	4	4
3	(Serbia) N Milojević	6	6
8	(India) P Gunneswaran	7^{7}	6^{5}	3
(Israel) E Leshem	6^{3}	7^{7}	6

Semifinals
3	(Serbia) N Milojević	6	6
(Israel) E Leshem	2	1
