= 2016 Tashkent Open =

- Date: September 26 – October 1
- Edition: 18th
- Category: WTA International
- Draw: 32S / 16D
- Prize money: $250,000
- Surface: Hard
- Location: Tashkent, Uzbekistan
- Venue: Tashkent Tennis Center

Champions

Singles
- (Czech Republic) Kristýna Plíšková

Doubles
- (Romania) Raluca Olaru / (Turkey) İpek Soylu
← 2015 ·	Tashkent Open	· 2017 →

The 2016 Tashkent Open was a WTA International women's tennis tournament played on outdoor hard courts. It was the 18th edition of the Tashkent Open, on the 2016 WTA Tour. It took place at the Tashkent Tennis Center in Tashkent, Uzbekistan, between September 26 and October 1, 2016. Unseeded Kristýna Plíšková won the singles title.

== Finals ==
=== Singles ===
(Czech Republic) Kristýna Plíšková defeated (Japan) Nao Hibino, 6–3, 2–6, 6–3

- It was Plíšková's only singles title of her career.

=== Doubles ===
(Romania) Raluca Olaru / (Turkey) İpek Soylu defeated (Netherlands) Demi Schuurs / (Czech Republic) Renata Voráčová, 7–5, 6–3

== Points and prize money ==
=== Point distribution ===
Event	W	F	SF	QF	Round of 16	Round of 32	Q	Q2	Q1
Singles	280	180	110	60	30	1	18	12	1
Doubles	280	180	110	60	1	—	—	—	—

=== Prize money ===
Event	W	F	SF	QF	Round of 16	Round of 32^{1}	Q2	Q1
Singles	$43,000	$21,400	$11,500	$6,200	$3,420	$2,220	$1,285	$750
Doubles	$12,300	$6,400	$3,435	$1,820	$960	—	—	—
Doubles prize money per team

_{^{1} Qualifiers prize money is also the Round of 32 prize money}

== Singles main-draw entrants ==
=== Seeds ===
Country	Player	Rank^{1}	Seed
~~SWE~~	~~Johanna Larsson~~	~~45~~	~~1~~
BEL	Kirsten Flipkens	58	2
TUR	Çağla Büyükakçay	64	3
JPN	Nao Hibino	76	4
JPN	Kurumi Nara	78	5
UKR	Lesia Tsurenko	80	6
ROU	Sorana Cîrstea	85	7
GBR	Naomi Broady	87	8
CZE	Denisa Allertová	89	9

- ^{1} Rankings as of September 19, 2016

=== Other entrants ===
The following players received wildcards into the singles main draw:

- (Uzbekistan) Komola Umarova
- (Croatia) Donna Vekić
- (Ukraine) Dayana Yastremska

The following players received entry from the qualifying draw:

- (Japan) Hiroko Kuwata
- (Czech Republic) Tereza Martincová
- (Uzbekistan) Sabina Sharipova
- (Turkey) İpek Soylu

The following player received entry as a lucky loser:

- (Georgia (country)) Sofia Shapatava

=== Withdrawals ===
Before the tournament

- (Slovakia) Jana Čepelová → replaced by (Spain) Sara Sorribes Tormo
- (Russia) Margarita Gasparyan → replaced by (Romania) Patricia Maria Țig
- (Chinese Taipei) Hsieh Su-wei → replaced by (Switzerland) Amra Sadiković
- (Sweden) Johanna Larsson → replaced by (Georgia (country)) Sofia Shapatava
- (Kazakhstan) Galina Voskoboeva → replaced by (Czech Republic) Kristýna Plíšková

=== Retirements ===
- (Italy) Francesca Schiavone
- (Ukraine) Lesia Tsurenko

== Doubles main-draw entrants ==
=== Seeds ===
Country	Player	Country	Player	Rank^{1}	Seed
UKR	Lyudmyla Kichenok	UKR	Nadiia Kichenok	129	1
USA	Nicole Melichar	THA	Varatchaya Wongteanchai	149	2
NED	Demi Schuurs	CZE	Renata Voráčová	166	3
ROU	Raluca Olaru	TUR	İpek Soylu	192	4

- ^{1} Rankings as of September 19, 2016

=== Other entrants ===
The following pairs received wildcards into the doubles main draw:

- (Uzbekistan) Arina Folts / (Uzbekistan) Komola Umarova
- (Uzbekistan) Polina Merenkova / (Ukraine) Dayana Yastremska
