= 2015 Tashkent Open – Doubles =

Doubles
- 2015 Tashkent Open

Final
- Champions: (Russia) Margarita Gasparyan (Russia) Alexandra Panova
- Runners-up: (Russia) Vera Dushevina (Czech Republic) Kateřina Siniaková
- Score: 6–1, 3–6, [10–3]

Details
- Draw: 16
- Seeds: 4

Events
| Singles | Doubles |
| ← 2014 · | Tashkent Open | · 2016 → |

Aleksandra Krunić and Kateřina Siniaková were the defending champions, but chose not to participate together. Krunić played alongside Petra Martić, but lost in the quarterfinals to Anna-Lena Friedsam and Katarzyna Piter.
Siniaková teamed up with Vera Dushevina, but lost in the final to Margarita Gasparyan and Alexandra Panova, 1–6, 6–3, [3–10].

== Seeds ==
1. (Netherlands) Kiki Bertens / (Sweden) Johanna Larsson (withdrew)
2. (Russia) Margarita Gasparyan / (Russia) Alexandra Panova (champions)
3. (United Kingdom) Jocelyn Rae / (United Kingdom) Anna Smith (first round)
4. (Georgia (country)) Oksana Kalashnikova / (Poland) Paula Kania (first round)

== Draw ==
=== Key ===
- Q = Qualifier
- WC = Wild card
- LL = Lucky loser
- Alt = Alternate
- SE = Special exempt
- PR = Protected ranking
- ITF = ITF entry
- JE = Junior exempt
- w/o = Walkover
- r = Retired
- d = Defaulted
- SR = Special ranking

=== Draw ===
First round
Alt | (Ukraine) A Fomina (Ukraine) K Kozlova | 4 | 2
WC | (Uzbekistan) N Abduraimova (Uzbekistan) A Amanmuradova | 6 | 6
(Romania) A Mitu (Latvia) J Ostapenko | 3 | 6 | [3]
(Russia) V Dushevina (Czech Republic) K Siniaková | 6 | 1 | [10]
3 | (United Kingdom) J Rae (United Kingdom) A Smith | 6^{3} | 6 | [7]
WC | (Russia) E Bychkova (Switzerland) S Vögele | 7^{7} | 2 | [10]
(Uzbekistan) A Folts (Uzbekistan) S Sharipova | 3 | 4
(Uzbekistan) V Ekshibarova (Russia) A Gabueva | 6 | 6
(Serbia) A Krunić (Croatia) P Martić | 4 | 6 | [12]
(Germany) A Beck (Germany) C Witthöft | 6 | 2 | [10]
(Germany) A-L Friedsam (Poland) K Piter | 7^{7} | 6
4 | (Georgia (country)) O Kalashnikova (Poland) P Kania | 6^{4} | 3
(Russia) E Kulichkova (Russia) E Rodina | 4 | 4
(Germany) C Daniels (Belarus) L Marozava | 6 | 6
(Japan) N Hibino (Ukraine) A Kalinina | 4 | 2
2 | (Russia) M Gasparyan (Russia) A Panova | 6 | 6

Quarterfinals
WC | (Uzbekistan) N Abduraimova (Uzbekistan) A Amanmuradova | 6 | 1 | [4]
(Russia) V Dushevina (Czech Republic) K Siniaková | 3 | 6 | [10]
WC | (Russia) E Bychkova (Switzerland) S Vögele | 4 | 6 | [10]
(Uzbekistan) V Ekshibarova (Russia) A Gabueva | 6 | 1 | [7]
(Serbia) A Krunić (Croatia) P Martić | 4 | 6 | [9]
(Germany) A-L Friedsam (Poland) K Piter | 6 | 4 | [11]
(Germany) C Daniels (Belarus) L Marozava | 4 | 3
2 | (Russia) M Gasparyan (Russia) A Panova | 6 | 6

Semifinals
(Russia) V Dushevina (Czech Republic) K Siniaková | 7 | 7^{7}
WC | (Russia) E Bychkova (Switzerland) S Vögele | 5 | 6^{4}
(Germany) A-L Friedsam (Poland) K Piter | 4 | 1 | r
2 | (Russia) M Gasparyan (Russia) A Panova | 6 | 2

Final
(Russia) V Dushevina (Czech Republic) K Siniaková | 1 | 6 | [3]
2 | (Russia) M Gasparyan (Russia) A Panova | 6 | 3 | [10]
