= Sevil Yuldasheva =

Uzbekistani tennis player (born 2002)

- Country (sports): Uzbekistan
- Born: 9 January 2002 (age 24)
- Prize money: $25,010

Singles
- Career record: 92–108
- Career titles: 0
- Highest ranking: No. 847 (15 July 2019)
- Current ranking: No. 916 (9 November 2026)

Doubles
- Career record: 59–73
- Career titles: 2 ITF
- Highest ranking: No. 512 (2 November 2026)
- Current ranking: No. 513 ( 9 November 2026)
- Last updated on: 13 November 2026.

Sevil Yuldasheva (born 9 January 2002) is an Uzbekistani tennis player.

Yuldasheva who reached a career-high junior ranking of 575 on 5 September 2016, has a career-high by the WTA of 709 in doubles.

She made her WTA Tour main-draw debut at the 2017 Tashkent Open, in the doubles, draw partnering Olesya Kim.

== ITF Circuit finals ==
=== Doubles: 12 (2 titles, 10 runner-ups) ===
Legend W50 tournaments W35 tournaments (0–1) W15 tournaments (2–9)	Finals by surface Hard (1–4) Clay (1–5) Carpet (0–1)

Result	W–L	Date	Tournament	Tier	Surface	Partner	Opponents	Score
Loss	0–1	Sep 2018	ITF Shymkent, Kazakhstan	W15	Clay	(Uzbekistan) Yasmina Karimjanova	(Kazakhstan) Yekaterina Dmitrichenko (Russia) Anna Iakovleva	4–6, 3–6
Loss	0–2	Apr 2019	ITF Shymkent, Kazakhstan	W15	Clay	(South Korea) Lee Eun-hye	(Russia) Kamilla Rakhimova (Moldova) Vitalia Stamat	3–6, 6–7^{(4)}
Loss	0–3	Nov 2022	ITF Solarino, Italy	W15	Carpet (i)	(Netherlands) Lian Tran	(Italy) Virginia Ferrara (Italy) Georgia Pedone	3–6, 2–6
Loss	0–4	Feb 2023	ITF Jhajjar, India	W15	Clay	(Romania) Alexandra Iordache	(Sweden) Vanessa Ersöz (Sweden) Fanny Östlund	6–0, 5–7, [5–10]
Loss	0–5	Mar 2023	ITF Antalya, Turkey	W15	Clay	(Ukraine) Viktoriia Dema	(Brazil) Ana Candiotto (Germany) Natalia Siedliska	3-6, 5-7
Win	1–5	Oct 2023	ITF Sharm El Sheikh, Egypt	W15	Hard	(Latvia) Kamilla Bartone	Alisa Kummel (Russia) Ekaterina Makarova	6–2, 6–3
Loss	1–6	Oct 2025	ITF Sharm El Sheikh, Egypt	W15	Hard	(Latvia) Kamilla Bartone	(Egypt) Aya El Sayed (Egypt) Nada Fouad	1–6, 4–6
Loss	1–7	Feb 2026	ITF Manacor, Spain	W15	Hard	(Netherlands) Merel Hoedt	(Mexico) Midori Castillo Meza (Colombia) Valentina Mediorreal	5–7, 4–6
Loss	1–8	Mar 2026	ITF Ch. Sambhaji Nagar, India	W15	Hard	(Germany) Anastasia Kuparev	(Kazakhstan) Zhibek Kulambayeva (Russia) Ekaterina Yashina	1–6, 4–6
Loss	1–9	Apr 2026	Kunming Open, China	W35	Clay	(South Korea) Shin Ji-ho	(Russia) Sofya Lansere (Russia) Alexandra Shubladze	6–7^{(4)}, 1–6
Win	2–9	May 2026	ITF Tsaghkadzor, Armenia	W15	Clay	(Kazakhstan) Aruzhan Sagandykova	(Italy) Ginevra Parentini Vallega Montebruno (Iran) Meshkatolzahra Safi	7–5, 6–2
Loss	2–10	Oct 2026	ITF Islamabad, Pakistan	W15	Hard	(Germany) Anastasiya Kuparev	(China) Wu Ruxi (Thailand) Kamonwan Yodpetch	3–6, 6–4, [2–10]

== ITF Junior finals ==
Category G1
Category G2
Category G3
Category G4
Category G5

=== Singles (1–1) ===
Outcome	No.	Date	Tournament	Surface	Opponent	Score
Runner-up	1.	27 August 2016	Bishkek, Kyrgyzstan	Clay	(Kazakhstan) Anastassiya Astakhova	0–6, 1–6
Winner	2.	12 May 2018	Dushanbe, Tajikistan	Hard	(Russia) Iuliia Asanova	6–1, 7–6^{(9)}

=== Doubles (0–4) ===
Outcome	No.	Date	Tournament	Surface	Partner	Opponents	Score
Runner-up	1.	20 August 2016	Bishkek, Kyrgyzstan	Clay	(Uzbekistan) Valeriya Vorobyova	(Uzbekistan) Yasmina Karimjanova (Kyrgyzstan) Emma Nurgazieva	4–6, 4–6
Runner-up	2.	12 November 2017	Esch-sur-Alzette, Luxembourg	Hard (i)	(Greece) Marianne Argyrokastriti	(France) Flavie Brugnone (Germany) Nastasja Mariana Schunk	3–6, 4–6
Runner-up	3.	5 May 2018	Almaty, Kazakhstan	Clay	(Uzbekistan) Yasmina Karimjanova	(Russia) Elizaveta Dementyeva (Kazakhstan) Yekaterina Dmitrichenko	1–6, 3–6
Runner-up	4.	12 May 2018	Dushanbe, Tajikistan	Hard	(India) Tanisha Kashyap	(Russia) Alena Kubanova (Russia) Sofia Sharonova	6–7^{(5)}, 6–7^{(4)}
