= Yannick Jankovits =

French tennis player

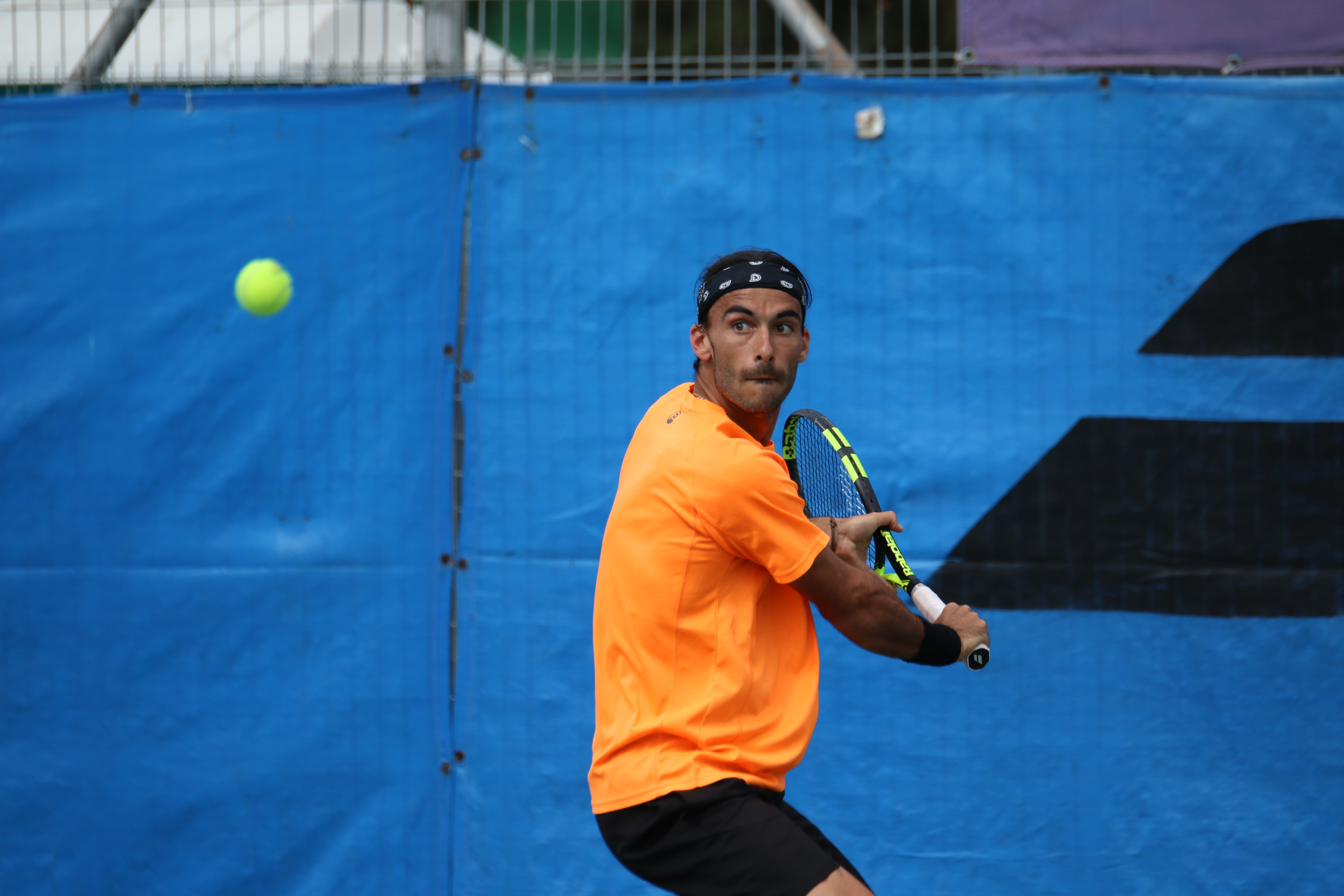
- Country (sports): France
- Born: 6 January 1987 (age 39) France
- Retired: 2019 (last match played)
- Plays: Right-handed (one-handed backhand)
- Prize money: $143,661

Singles
- Highest ranking: No. 226 (14 September 2015)

Doubles
- Highest ranking: No. 226 (10 April 2017)

Yannick Jankovits (born 6 January 1987) is a French tennis coach and a former professional player. Jankovits has a career high ATP singles ranking of No. 226 achieved on 14 September 2014. He also has a career high ATP doubles ranking of No. 226, achieved on 10 April 2017.

== Career ==
=== 2016: Maiden Challenger title ===
In June, he won his maiden ATP Challenger Tour title in doubles in Fergana.

=== 2021-present: Coaching ===
Jankovits joined the French Touch Academy as the manager of Team Pro in 2021, where he started coaching Titouan Droguet.

=== 2024-2026: Two year suspension from professional tennis ===
Jankovits was suspended for two years, with the suspension starting on 21 October 2024, and expiring on 20 October 2026. He was additionally given a $28,000 fine, of which $21,000 was suspended, after admitting to match fixing tennis matches played in 2017 and 2018.

== ATP Challenger Tour and ITF Futures finals ==
=== Singles: 29 (15–14) ===
Legend
ATP Challenger Tour (0–0)
ITF Futures (15–14)

Result	Date	Category	Tournament	Surface	Opponent	Score

=== Doubles: 36 (20–16) ===
Legend
ATP Challenger Tour (1–0)
ITF Futures (19–16)

Result	Date	Category	Tournament	Surface	Partner	Opponents	Score
Win	June 2016	Challenger	Fergana, Uzbekistan	Hard	(Switzerland) Luca Margaroli	(Japan) Toshihide Matsui (India) Vishnu Vardhan	6–4, 7–6^{(7–4)}
