= Mubarak Al-Harrasi =

Qatari tennis player

- Full name: Mubarak Shannan Zayid Al-Harrasi
- Country (sports): Qatar
- Born: 14 April 1995 (age 31) Doha, Qatar
- Prize money: $61,650

Singles
- Career record: 0–4 (at ATP Tour level, Grand Slam level, and in Davis Cup)
- Career titles: 0
- Highest ranking: No. 1,159 (12 December 2016)

Doubles
- Career record: 0–4 (at ATP Tour level, Grand Slam level, and in Davis Cup)
- Career titles: 0
- Highest ranking: No. 1,332 (19 September 2016)

Team competitions
- Davis Cup: 25–15
Medal record
Men's tennis
Representing Qatar
Islamic Solidarity Games
Bronze medal – third place	2017 Baku	Singles
- Last updated on: 15 July 2019.

Mubarak Shannan Zayid Al-Harrasi (born 14 April 1995) is a Qatari tennis player.

Al-Harrasi has a career high ATP singles ranking of 1159 achieved on 12 December 2016. He also has a career high ATP doubles ranking of 1332 achieved on 19 December 2016.

Al-Harrasi has represented Qatar in the Davis Cup.

== Career ==
Al-Harrasi made his ATP main draw debut at the 2016 Qatar ExxonMobil Open.

Al-Harrasi won bronze medal at the 2017 Islamic Solidarity Games at the men's singles event.

== ITF Tour finals ==
=== Doubles: 1 (0–1) ===
Legend
ATP Challengers (0–0)
ITF Futures (0–1)

Titles by surface
Hard (0–1)

Result	W–L	Date	Tournament	Tier	Surface	Partner	Opponents	Score
Loss	0–1	Dec 2018	Doha, Qatar F5	Futures	Hard	(Italy) Adelchi Virgili	(Portugal) Gonçalo Oliveira (Portugal) Bernardo Saraiva	6–4, 3–6, [11–13]

== Islamic Solidarity Games ==
=== Singles 1 (1 bronze medal) ===
Outcome	No.	Date	Tournament	Surface	Opponent	Score
Victory	1.	21 May 2017	Baku, Azerbaijan	Hard	(Morocco) Amine Ahouda	6–0 ret.
