= Olesya Kim =

Uzbekistani tennis player (born 2002)

- Country (sports): Uzbekistan
- Born: 6 September 2002 (age 22); Uzbekistan

Singles
- Career titles: 2

Doubles
- Career titles: 1

Olesya Kim (born 6 September 2002) is an Uzbekistani tennis player. Kim made her WTA debut at the 2017 Tashkent Open as a wildcard entry.

== ITF Junior Finals ==
Grand Slam
Category GA
Category G1
Category G2
Category G3
Category G4
Category G5

=== Singles Finals (1–0) ===
Outcome	No.	Date	Tournament	Surface	Opponent	Score
Winner	1.	22 July 2017	Andijan, Uzbekistan	Hard	(Uzbekistan) Yuliya Kim	6–1, 6–0

=== Doubles finals (0–2) ===
Outcome	No.	Date	Tournament	Surface	Partner	Opponents in the final	Score in the final
Runner-up	1.	13 May 2017	Dushanbe, Tajikistan	Hard	(Uzbekistan) Elina Sharipova	(Russia) Anfisa Korolkova (Russia) Ksenia Tarasova	2–6, 4–6
Runner-up	2.	26 August 2017	Bishkek, Kyrgyzstan	Hard	(Uzbekistan) Yasmina Karimjanova	(Kazakhstan) Yekaterina Dmitrichenko (Russia) Mariya Krasakova	6–7^{(5)}, 5–7
