= Polina Merenkova =

Uzbekistani tennis player

- Country (sports): Uzbekistan
- Born: 11 November 1995 (age 30)
- Plays: Right (two-handed backhand)
- Prize money: $16,698

Singles
- Career record: 33–62
- Career titles: 0
- Highest ranking: No. 774 (9 June 2014)

Doubles
- Career record: 46–50
- Career titles: 4 ITF
- Highest ranking: No. 431 (17 July 2017)

Polina Merenkova (born 11 November 1995) is a former professional Uzbekistani tennis player.

Merenkova has a career-high doubles ranking of 431 by the WTA, which she achieved on 17 July 2017. She won four doubles titles on tournaments of the ITF Circuit.

She made her WTA Tour main-draw debut at the 2016 Tashkent Open in the doubles event, partnering Dayana Yastremska.

== ITF Circuit finals ==
=== Doubles (4–2) ===
Legend $25,000 tournaments $10,000 tournaments	Finals by surface Hard (3–0) Clay (1–2)

Result	No.	Date	Location	Surface	Partner	Opponents	Score
Win	1	Nov 2014	Astana, Kazakhstan	Hard (i)	(Uzbekistan) Albina Khabibulina	(Kazakhstan) Kamila Kerimbayeva (Russia) Ekaterina Yashina	6–2, 6–2
Win	2	Jan 2015	Aktobe, Kazakhstan	Hard (i)	(Uzbekistan) Albina Khabibulina	(Kazakhstan) Alexandra Grinchishina (Kazakhstan) Ekaterina Klyueva	6–4, 6–1
Win	3	Jan 2015	Aktobe, Kazakhstan	Hard (i)	(Uzbekistan) Albina Khabibulina	(Kyrgyzstan) Ksenia Palkina (Netherlands) Eva Wacanno	6–2, 7–6^{(8–6)}
Win	4	May 2015	Shymkent, Kazakhstan	Clay	(Uzbekistan) Albina Khabibulina	(Uzbekistan) Vlada Ekshibarova (Russia) Daria Lodikova	6–3, 6–1
Loss	1	Aug 2015	Kazan, Russia	Clay	(Russia) Anastasia Frolova	(Ukraine) Oleksandra Korashvili (Russia) Polina Leykina	w/o
Loss	2	Oct 2015	Shymkent, Kazakhstan	Clay	(Uzbekistan) Albina Khabibulina	(Georgia (country)) Ekaterine Gorgodze (Georgia (country)) Sofia Kvatsabaia	5–7, 6–3, [6–10]
