= Komola Umarova =

Uzbekistani tennis player (born 1999)

- Country (sports): Uzbekistan
- Born: 23 October 1999 (age 26)
- Plays: Right-handed (two-handed backhand)
- Prize money: $11,696

Singles
- Career record: 28–25
- Career titles: 0
- Highest ranking: No. 743 (25 September 2017)
- Current ranking: No. 841 (17 July 2017)

Doubles
- Career record: 12–21
- Career titles: 0
- Highest ranking: No. 667 (21 May 2018)
- Current ranking: No. 738 (17 July 2017)

Team competitions
- Fed Cup: 1–0
- Last updated on: 20 July 2017.

Komola Umarova (born 23 October 1999) is an Uzbekistani female tennis player.

Umarova has a career high WTA singles ranking of 762, achieved on 30 January 2017. Umarova also has a career high WTA doubles ranking of 738 achieved on 17 July 2017.

Umarova made her WTA main draw debut at the 2016 Tashkent Open, where she lost to Nao Hibino in the first round.

Playing for Uzbekistan in Fed Cup, she has a career W/L record of 1–0.

Umarova is currently studying at Florida International University, where she plays tennis for the Panthers.
