= 2015 ATP Challenger Tour =

Tennis tournament organized by ATP

Details
- Duration: 5 January 2015 – 29 November 2015
- Edition: 38th (7th under this name)
- Tournaments: 166
- Categories: Challenger Tour Finals; Challenger 125 (9); Challenger 110 (6); Challenger 100 (16); Challenger 90 (45); Challenger 80 (47)

Achievements (singles)
- Most titles: (Argentina) Guido Pella (Spain) Íñigo Cervantes (Italy) Paolo Lorenzi (South Korea) Chung Hyeon (4)
- Most finals: (South Korea) Chung Hyeon (7)

The ATP Challenger Tour, in 2015 was the secondary professional tennis circuit organized by the ATP. The 2015 ATP Challenger Tour calendar comprised 166 tournaments, with prize money ranging from $40,000 up to $220,000. It was the 38th edition of challenger tournaments cycle, and 7th under the name of Challenger Tour.

== Schedule ==
This is the complete schedule of events on the 2015 calendar, with player progression documented from the quarterfinals stage.

=== January ===
Week of	Tournament	Champions	Runners-up	Semifinalists	Quarterfinalists
January 5	BNP Paribas de Nouvelle-Calédonie; Nouméa, New Caledonia; Hard – $75,000+H – 32S/16Q/16D; Singles – Doubles	(Belgium) Steve Darcis; 6–3, 6–2	(Spain) Adrián Menéndez Maceiras	(France) Adrian Mannarino (Chinese Taipei) Jimmy Wang	(United States) Bradley Klahn (France) David Guez (Brazil) Guilherme Clezar (United States) Chase Buchanan
January 5	BNP Paribas de Nouvelle-Calédonie; Nouméa, New Caledonia; Hard – $75,000+H – 32S/16Q/16D; Singles – Doubles	(United States) Austin Krajicek (United States) Tennys Sandgren; 7–6^{(7–2)}, 6–7^{(5–7)}, [10–5]	(United States) Jarmere Jenkins (United States) Bradley Klahn	(France) Adrian Mannarino (Chinese Taipei) Jimmy Wang	(United States) Bradley Klahn (France) David Guez (Brazil) Guilherme Clezar (United States) Chase Buchanan
January 5	City of Onkaparinga ATP Challenger; Happy Valley, Australia; Hard – $50,000 – 32S/24Q/16D; Singles – Doubles	(United States) Ryan Harrison; 7–6^{(10–8)}, 6–4	(Cyprus) Marcos Baghdatis	(Australia) Alex Bolt (Australia) Andrew Harris	(Belgium) Maxime Authom (France) Paul-Henri Mathieu (Russia) Andrey Kuznetsov (Kazakhstan) Aleksandr Nedovyesov
January 5	City of Onkaparinga ATP Challenger; Happy Valley, Australia; Hard – $50,000 – 32S/24Q/16D; Singles – Doubles	(Russia) Andrey Kuznetsov (Kazakhstan) Aleksandr Nedovyesov; 7–5, 6–4	(Australia) Alex Bolt (Australia) Andrew Whittington	(Australia) Alex Bolt (Australia) Andrew Harris	(Belgium) Maxime Authom (France) Paul-Henri Mathieu (Russia) Andrey Kuznetsov (Kazakhstan) Aleksandr Nedovyesov
January 12	Morocco Tennis Tour – Casablanca; Casablanca, Morocco; Clay – €42,500 – 32S/23Q/16D; Singles – Doubles	(Morocco) Lamine Ouahab; 6–0, 7–6^{(8–6)}	(Spain) Javier Martí	(France) Guillaume Rufin (Serbia) Laslo Djere	(Portugal) Rui Machado (Romania) Adrian Ungur (France) Maxime Teixeira (France) Florent Serra
January 12	Morocco Tennis Tour – Casablanca; Casablanca, Morocco; Clay – €42,500 – 32S/23Q/16D; Singles – Doubles	(Lithuania) Laurynas Grigelis (Romania) Adrian Ungur; 3–6, 6–2, [10–5]	(Italy) Flavio Cipolla (Italy) Alessandro Motti	(France) Guillaume Rufin (Serbia) Laslo Djere	(Portugal) Rui Machado (Romania) Adrian Ungur (France) Maxime Teixeira (France) Florent Serra
January 19	No tournaments scheduled.				
January 26	Claro Open Bucaramanga; Bucaramanga, Colombia; Clay – $50,000+H – 32S/30Q/16D; Singles – Doubles	(Spain) Daniel Gimeno Traver; 6–3, 1–6, 7–5	(Portugal) Gastão Elias	(Spain) Jordi Samper Montaña (Argentina) Facundo Bagnis	(Austria) Gerald Melzer (Colombia) Alejandro Falla (Austria) Andreas Haider-Maurer (Dominican Republic) Víctor Estrella Burgos
January 26	Claro Open Bucaramanga; Bucaramanga, Colombia; Clay – $50,000+H – 32S/30Q/16D; Singles – Doubles	(Argentina) Guillermo Durán (Argentina) Andrés Molteni; 7–5, 6–7^{(8–10)}, [10–0]	(Colombia) Nicolás Barrientos (Colombia) Eduardo Struvay	(Spain) Jordi Samper Montaña (Argentina) Facundo Bagnis	(Austria) Gerald Melzer (Colombia) Alejandro Falla (Austria) Andreas Haider-Maurer (Dominican Republic) Víctor Estrella Burgos
January 26	Royal Lahaina Challenger; Lahaina, United States; Hard – $50,000 – 32S/20Q/16D; Singles – Doubles	(United States) Jared Donaldson; 6–1, 6–4	(United States) Nicolas Meister	(Republic of Ireland) James McGee (United States) Bradley Klahn	(Zimbabwe) Takanyi Garanganga (United States) Stefan Kozlov (United States) Dennis Novikov (Switzerland) Sandro Ehrat
January 26	Royal Lahaina Challenger; Lahaina, United States; Hard – $50,000 – 32S/20Q/16D; Singles – Doubles	(United States) Jared Donaldson (United States) Stefan Kozlov; 6–3, 6–4	(United States) Chase Buchanan (United States) Rhyne Williams	(Republic of Ireland) James McGee (United States) Bradley Klahn	(Zimbabwe) Takanyi Garanganga (United States) Stefan Kozlov (United States) Dennis Novikov (Switzerland) Sandro Ehrat
January 26	Hong Kong ATP Challenger; Hong Kong, Hong Kong; Hard – $50,000 – 32S/27Q/16D; Singles – Doubles	(United Kingdom) Kyle Edmund; 6–1, 6–2	(Japan) Tatsuma Ito	(Japan) Yoshihito Nishioka (South Korea) Chung Hyeon	(India) Saketh Myneni (Belgium) Niels Desein (Slovenia) Blaž Kavčič (India) Somdev Devvarman
January 26	Hong Kong ATP Challenger; Hong Kong, Hong Kong; Hard – $50,000 – 32S/27Q/16D; Singles – Doubles	(Chinese Taipei) Hsieh Cheng-peng (Chinese Taipei) Yi Chu-huan; 6–4, 6–2	(India) Saketh Myneni (India) Sanam Singh	(Japan) Yoshihito Nishioka (South Korea) Chung Hyeon	(India) Saketh Myneni (Belgium) Niels Desein (Slovenia) Blaž Kavčič (India) Somdev Devvarman

=== February ===
Week of	Tournament	Champions	Runners-up	Semifinalists	Quarterfinalists
February 2	RBC Tennis Championships of Dallas; Dallas, United States; Hard (i) – $100,000 – 32S/32Q/16D; Singles – Doubles	(United States) Tim Smyczek; 6–2, 4–1 retired	(United States) Rajeev Ram	(Argentina) Marco Trungelliti (Russia) Teymuraz Gabashvili	(United States) Alex Kuznetsov (Australia) John-Patrick Smith (Russia) Andrey Rublev (Argentina) Guido Andreozzi
February 2	RBC Tennis Championships of Dallas; Dallas, United States; Hard (i) – $100,000 – 32S/32Q/16D; Singles – Doubles	(Ukraine) Denys Molchanov (Russia) Andrey Rublev; 6–4, 7–6^{(7–5)}	(Mexico) Hans Hach Verdugo (Mexico) Luis Patiño	(Argentina) Marco Trungelliti (Russia) Teymuraz Gabashvili	(United States) Alex Kuznetsov (Australia) John-Patrick Smith (Russia) Andrey Rublev (Argentina) Guido Andreozzi
February 2	McDonald's Burnie International; Burnie, Australia; Hard – $50,000 – 32S/27Q/16D; Singles – Doubles	(South Korea) Chung Hyeon; 6–2, 7–5	(Australia) Alex Bolt	(Australia) Benjamin Mitchell (Australia) Matthew Barton	(China) Zhang Ze (United States) Bjorn Fratangelo (United Kingdom) Kyle Edmund (Australia) Matthew Ebden
February 2	McDonald's Burnie International; Burnie, Australia; Hard – $50,000 – 32S/27Q/16D; Singles – Doubles	(Australia) Carsten Ball (Australia) Matt Reid; 7–5, 6–4	(Moldova) Radu Albot (Australia) Matthew Ebden	(Australia) Benjamin Mitchell (Australia) Matthew Barton	(China) Zhang Ze (United States) Bjorn Fratangelo (United Kingdom) Kyle Edmund (Australia) Matthew Ebden
February 2	Aegon GB Pro-Series Glasgow; Glasgow, United Kingdom; Hard (i) – €42,500 – 32S/32Q/16D; Singles – Doubles	(Belgium) Niels Desein; 7–6^{(7–4)}, 2–6, 7–6^{(7–4)}	(Belgium) Ruben Bemelmans	(Kazakhstan) Aleksandr Nedovyesov (France) David Guez	(United Kingdom) Daniel Cox (United Kingdom) Edward Corrie (Italy) Roberto Marcora (Belgium) Maxime Authom
February 2	Aegon GB Pro-Series Glasgow; Glasgow, United Kingdom; Hard (i) – €42,500 – 32S/32Q/16D; Singles – Doubles	(Netherlands) Wesley Koolhof (Netherlands) Matwé Middelkoop; 6–1, 6–4	(Ukraine) Sergei Bubka (Kazakhstan) Aleksandr Nedovyesov	(Kazakhstan) Aleksandr Nedovyesov (France) David Guez	(United Kingdom) Daniel Cox (United Kingdom) Edward Corrie (Italy) Roberto Marcora (Belgium) Maxime Authom
February 9	Milex Open; Santo Domingo, Dominican Republic; Clay – $50,000+H (green) – 32S/20Q/16D; Singles – Doubles	(Bosnia and Herzegovina) Damir Džumhur; 7–5, 3–1 retired	(Argentina) Renzo Olivo	(Chile) Cristian Garín (Portugal) Gastão Elias	(Chile) Nicolás Jarry (Austria) Gerald Melzer (Bolivia) Hugo Dellien (Spain) Roberto Carballés Baena
February 9	Milex Open; Santo Domingo, Dominican Republic; Clay – $50,000+H (green) – 32S/20Q/16D; Singles – Doubles	(Venezuela) Roberto Maytín (Chile) Hans Podlipnik; 6–3, 2–6, [10–4]	(Monaco) Romain Arneodo (Monaco) Benjamin Balleret	(Chile) Cristian Garín (Portugal) Gastão Elias	(Chile) Nicolás Jarry (Austria) Gerald Melzer (Bolivia) Hugo Dellien (Spain) Roberto Carballés Baena
February 9	Trofeo Faip–Perrel; Bergamo, Italy; Hard (i) – €42,500+H – 32S/32Q/16D; Singles – Doubles	(France) Benoît Paire; 6–3, 7–6^{(7–3)}	(Kazakhstan) Aleksandr Nedovyesov	(Ukraine) Illya Marchenko (Estonia) Jürgen Zopp	(Germany) Daniel Brands (Germany) Tim Pütz (Uzbekistan) Farrukh Dustov (France) Lucas Pouille
February 9	Trofeo Faip–Perrel; Bergamo, Italy; Hard (i) – €42,500+H – 32S/32Q/16D; Singles – Doubles	(Germany) Martin Emmrich (Sweden) Andreas Siljeström; 6–4, 7–5	(Poland) Błażej Koniusz (Poland) Mateusz Kowalczyk	(Ukraine) Illya Marchenko (Estonia) Jürgen Zopp	(Germany) Daniel Brands (Germany) Tim Pütz (Uzbekistan) Farrukh Dustov (France) Lucas Pouille
February 9	Launceston International; Launceston, Australia; Hard – $50,000 – 32S/17Q/16D; Singles – Doubles	(United States) Bjorn Fratangelo; 4–6, 6–2, 6–0	(South Korea) Chung Hyeon	(China) Zhang Ze (Australia) Jordan Thompson	(United States) Bradley Klahn (New Zealand) Jose Rubin Statham (Australia) Harry Bourchier (Australia) Benjamin Mitchell
February 9	Launceston International; Launceston, Australia; Hard – $50,000 – 32S/17Q/16D; Singles – Doubles	(Moldova) Radu Albot (United States) Mitchell Krueger; 3–6, 7–5, [11–9]	(Australia) Adam Hubble (New Zealand) Jose Rubin Statham	(China) Zhang Ze (Australia) Jordan Thompson	(United States) Bradley Klahn (New Zealand) Jose Rubin Statham (Australia) Harry Bourchier (Australia) Benjamin Mitchell
February 16	Wrocław Open; Wrocław, Poland; Hard (i) – €85,000+H – 32S/32Q/16D; Singles – Doubles	(Uzbekistan) Farrukh Dustov; 6–3, 6–4	(Bosnia and Herzegovina) Mirza Bašić	(Lithuania) Ričardas Berankis (Belgium) Steve Darcis	(Ukraine) Illya Marchenko (Czech Republic) Jan Mertl (Germany) Michael Berrer (Russia) Konstantin Kravchuk
February 16	Wrocław Open; Wrocław, Poland; Hard (i) – €85,000+H – 32S/32Q/16D; Singles – Doubles	(Germany) Philipp Petzschner (Germany) Tim Pütz; 7–6^{(7–4)}, 6–3	(Canada) Frank Dancevic (Poland) Andriej Kapaś	(Lithuania) Ričardas Berankis (Belgium) Steve Darcis	(Ukraine) Illya Marchenko (Czech Republic) Jan Mertl (Germany) Michael Berrer (Russia) Konstantin Kravchuk
February 16	Delhi Open; New Delhi, India; Hard – $100,000 – 32S/29Q/16D; Singles – Doubles	(India) Somdev Devvarman; 3–6, 6–4, 6–0	(India) Yuki Bhambri	(Belgium) Kimmer Coppejans (Belgium) Ruben Bemelmans	(India) Sanam Singh (India) Saketh Myneni (Australia) Luke Saville (Moldova) Radu Albot
February 16	Delhi Open; New Delhi, India; Hard – $100,000 – 32S/29Q/16D; Singles – Doubles	(Belarus) Egor Gerasimov (Russia) Alexander Kudryavtsev; 6–7^{(5–7)}, 6–4, [10–6]	(Italy) Riccardo Ghedin (Japan) Toshihide Matsui	(Belgium) Kimmer Coppejans (Belgium) Ruben Bemelmans	(India) Sanam Singh (India) Saketh Myneni (Australia) Luke Saville (Moldova) Radu Albot
February 16	Morelos Open; Cuernavaca, Mexico; Hard – $75,000+H – 32S/22Q/16D; Singles – Doubles	(Dominican Republic) Víctor Estrella Burgos; 7–5, 6–4	(Bosnia and Herzegovina) Damir Džumhur	(Austria) Gerald Melzer (Spain) Adrián Menéndez Maceiras	(United States) Dennis Novikov (United States) Daniel Nguyen (United States) Jason Jung (Colombia) Alejandro Falla
February 16	Morelos Open; Cuernavaca, Mexico; Hard – $75,000+H – 32S/22Q/16D; Singles – Doubles	(Philippines) Ruben Gonzales (United Kingdom) Darren Walsh; 4–6, 6–3, [12–10]	(Ecuador) Emilio Gómez (Venezuela) Roberto Maytín	(Austria) Gerald Melzer (Spain) Adrián Menéndez Maceiras	(United States) Dennis Novikov (United States) Daniel Nguyen (United States) Jason Jung (Colombia) Alejandro Falla
February 23	Challenger La Manche; Cherbourg-en-Cotentin, France; Hard (i) – €42,500+H – 32S/27Q/16D; Singles – Doubles	(Slovakia) Norbert Gombos; 6–1, 7–6^{(7–4)}	(France) Benoît Paire	(France) Enzo Couacaud (Belgium) Maxime Authom	(France) Kenny de Schepper (Italy) Andrea Arnaboldi (Russia) Konstantin Kravchuk (France) Maxime Teixeira
February 23	Challenger La Manche; Cherbourg-en-Cotentin, France; Hard (i) – €42,500+H – 32S/27Q/16D; Singles – Doubles	(Germany) Andreas Beck (Czech Republic) Jan Mertl; 6–2, 3–6, [10–3]	(Australia) Rameez Junaid (Canada) Adil Shamasdin	(France) Enzo Couacaud (Belgium) Maxime Authom	(France) Kenny de Schepper (Italy) Andrea Arnaboldi (Russia) Konstantin Kravchuk (France) Maxime Teixeira
February 23	Shimadzu All Japan Indoor Tennis Championships; Kyoto, Japan; Hard (i) – $50,000+H – 32S/32Q/16D; Singles – Doubles	(Poland) Michał Przysiężny; 6–3, 3–6, 6–3	(Australia) John Millman	(Poland) Andriej Kapaś (Japan) Tatsuma Ito	(Japan) Go Soeda (Japan) Yasutaka Uchiyama (Japan) Hiroki Kondo (Japan) Hiroki Moriya
February 23	Shimadzu All Japan Indoor Tennis Championships; Kyoto, Japan; Hard (i) – $50,000+H – 32S/32Q/16D; Singles – Doubles	(Australia) Benjamin Mitchell (Australia) Jordan Thompson; 6–3, 6–2	(Japan) Go Soeda (Japan) Yasutaka Uchiyama	(Poland) Andriej Kapaś (Japan) Tatsuma Ito	(Japan) Go Soeda (Japan) Yasutaka Uchiyama (Japan) Hiroki Kondo (Japan) Hiroki Moriya
February 23	Emami Kolkata Open ATP Challenger Tour; Kolkata, India; Hard – $50,000 – 32S/21Q/16D; Singles – Doubles	(Moldova) Radu Albot; 7–6^{(7–0)}, 6–1	(Australia) James Duckworth	(Belgium) Ruben Bemelmans (Chinese Taipei) Chen Ti	(Belarus) Egor Gerasimov (Germany) Richard Becker (India) Ramkumar Ramanathan (Russia) Alexander Kudryavtsev
February 23	Emami Kolkata Open ATP Challenger Tour; Kolkata, India; Hard – $50,000 – 32S/21Q/16D; Singles – Doubles	(India) Somdev Devvarman (India) Jeevan Nedunchezhiyan; Walkover	(Australia) James Duckworth (Australia) Luke Saville	(Belgium) Ruben Bemelmans (Chinese Taipei) Chen Ti	(Belarus) Egor Gerasimov (Germany) Richard Becker (India) Ramkumar Ramanathan (Russia) Alexander Kudryavtsev

=== March ===
Week of	Tournament	Champions	Runners-up	Semifinalists	Quarterfinalists
March 2	Open BNP Paribas Banque de Bretagne; Quimper, France; Hard (i) – €42,500+H – 32S/24Q/16D; Singles – Doubles	(France) Benoît Paire; 6–4, 3–6, 6–4	(France) Grégoire Barrère	(Uzbekistan) Farrukh Dustov (France) David Guez	(France) Maxime Teixeira (Belgium) Maxime Authom (Ukraine) Illya Marchenko (United Kingdom) Edward Corrie
March 2	Open BNP Paribas Banque de Bretagne; Quimper, France; Hard (i) – €42,500+H – 32S/24Q/16D; Singles – Doubles	(Italy) Flavio Cipolla (Germany) Dominik Meffert; 3–6, 7–6^{(7–5)}, [10–8]	(Germany) Martin Emmrich (Sweden) Andreas Siljeström	(Uzbekistan) Farrukh Dustov (France) David Guez	(France) Maxime Teixeira (Belgium) Maxime Authom (Ukraine) Illya Marchenko (United Kingdom) Edward Corrie
March 9	China International Guangzhou; Guangzhou, China; Hard – $50,000+H – 32S/32Q/16D; Singles – Doubles	(Belgium) Kimmer Coppejans; 7–6^{(8–6)}, 5–7, 6–1	(Italy) Roberto Marcora	(Hungary) Márton Fucsovics (South Korea) Chung Hyeon	(China) Zhang Ze (Bosnia and Herzegovina) Aldin Šetkić (France) Tristan Lamasine (Spain) Roberto Carballés Baena
March 9	China International Guangzhou; Guangzhou, China; Hard – $50,000+H – 32S/32Q/16D; Singles – Doubles	(Spain) Daniel Muñoz de la Nava (Kazakhstan) Aleksandr Nedovyesov; 6–2, 7–5	(France) Fabrice Martin (India) Purav Raja	(Hungary) Márton Fucsovics (South Korea) Chung Hyeon	(China) Zhang Ze (Bosnia and Herzegovina) Aldin Šetkić (France) Tristan Lamasine (Spain) Roberto Carballés Baena
March 9	Challenger ATP Cachantún Cup; Santiago, Chile; Clay – $40,000+H – 32S/28Q/16D; Singles – Doubles	(Argentina) Facundo Bagnis; 6–2, 5–7, 6–2	(Brazil) Guilherme Clezar	(Spain) Jordi Samper Montaña (Colombia) Alejandro González	(Spain) Rubén Ramírez Hidalgo (Brazil) Caio Zampieri (Argentina) Máximo González (Argentina) Juan Ignacio Londero
March 9	Challenger ATP Cachantún Cup; Santiago, Chile; Clay – $40,000+H – 32S/28Q/16D; Singles – Doubles	(Argentina) Andrés Molteni (Argentina) Guido Pella; 7–6^{(9–7)}, 3–6, [10–4]	(Argentina) Andrea Collarini (Argentina) Máximo González	(Spain) Jordi Samper Montaña (Colombia) Alejandro González	(Spain) Rubén Ramírez Hidalgo (Brazil) Caio Zampieri (Argentina) Máximo González (Argentina) Juan Ignacio Londero
March 16	Irving Tennis Classic; Irving, United States; Hard – $125,000+H – 32S/19Q/16D; Singles – Doubles	(Slovenia) Aljaž Bedene; 7–6^{(7–3)}, 3–6, 6–3	(United States) Tim Smyczek	(United Kingdom) Kyle Edmund (Luxembourg) Gilles Müller	(Belgium) Steve Darcis (Cyprus) Marcos Baghdatis (Germany) Benjamin Becker (Germany) Alexander Zverev
March 16	Irving Tennis Classic; Irving, United States; Hard – $125,000+H – 32S/19Q/16D; Singles – Doubles	(Sweden) Robert Lindstedt (Ukraine) Sergiy Stakhovsky; 6–4, 6–4	(Germany) Benjamin Becker (Germany) Philipp Petzschner	(United Kingdom) Kyle Edmund (Luxembourg) Gilles Müller	(Belgium) Steve Darcis (Cyprus) Marcos Baghdatis (Germany) Benjamin Becker (Germany) Alexander Zverev
March 16	Gemdale ATP Challenger China International Shenzhen; Shenzhen, China; Hard – $75,000+H – 32S/27Q/16D; Singles – Doubles	(Slovenia) Blaž Kavčič; 7–5, 6–4	(Brazil) André Ghem	(Spain) Daniel Muñoz de la Nava (India) Sanam Singh	(France) Tristan Lamasine (Belarus) Uladzimir Ignatik (Russia) Alexander Kudryavtsev (Kazakhstan) Aleksandr Nedovyesov
March 16	Gemdale ATP Challenger China International Shenzhen; Shenzhen, China; Hard – $75,000+H – 32S/27Q/16D; Singles – Doubles	(Germany) Gero Kretschmer (Germany) Alexander Satschko; 6–1, 3–6, [10–2]	(India) Saketh Myneni (India) Divij Sharan	(Spain) Daniel Muñoz de la Nava (India) Sanam Singh	(France) Tristan Lamasine (Belarus) Uladzimir Ignatik (Russia) Alexander Kudryavtsev (Kazakhstan) Aleksandr Nedovyesov
March 16	Challenger Banque Nationale de Drummondville; Drummondville, Canada; Hard (i) – $50,000+H – 32S/21Q/16D; Singles – Doubles	(Australia) John-Patrick Smith; 6–7^{(11–13)}, 7–6^{(7–3)}, 7–5	(Canada) Frank Dancevic	(Belgium) Germain Gigounon (Bulgaria) Dimitar Kutrovsky	(United States) Kevin King (United States) Jarmere Jenkins (Italy) Matteo Donati (United States) Alex Kuznetsov
March 16	Challenger Banque Nationale de Drummondville; Drummondville, Canada; Hard (i) – $50,000+H – 32S/21Q/16D; Singles – Doubles	(Canada) Philip Bester (Australia) Chris Guccione; 6–4, 7–6^{(8–6)}	(Canada) Frank Dancevic (Germany) Frank Moser	(Belgium) Germain Gigounon (Bulgaria) Dimitar Kutrovsky	(United States) Kevin King (United States) Jarmere Jenkins (Italy) Matteo Donati (United States) Alex Kuznetsov
March 16	Kazan Kremlin Cup; Kazan, Russia; Hard (i) – $40,000+H – 32S/28Q/16D; Singles – Doubles	(Russia) Aslan Karatsev; 6–4, 4–6, 6–3	(Russia) Konstantin Kravchuk	(Slovakia) Adrian Sikora (India) Yuki Bhambri	(Turkey) Marsel İlhan (Poland) Michał Przysiężny (Italy) Andrea Arnaboldi (Russia) Evgeny Donskoy
March 16	Kazan Kremlin Cup; Kazan, Russia; Hard (i) – $40,000+H – 32S/28Q/16D; Singles – Doubles	(Russia) Mikhail Elgin (Slovakia) Igor Zelenay; 6–3, 6–3	(Italy) Andrea Arnaboldi (Italy) Matteo Viola	(Slovakia) Adrian Sikora (India) Yuki Bhambri	(Turkey) Marsel İlhan (Poland) Michał Przysiężny (Italy) Andrea Arnaboldi (Russia) Evgeny Donskoy
March 23	No tournaments scheduled.				
March 30	Electra Israel Open; Ra'anana, Israel; Hard – $125,000 – 32S/32Q/16D; Singles – Doubles	(Georgia (country)) Nikoloz Basilashvili; 4–6, 6–4, 6–3	(Slovakia) Lukáš Lacko	(Moldova) Radu Albot (Germany) Michael Berrer	(Russia) Evgeny Donskoy (Slovenia) Blaž Rola (Turkey) Marsel İlhan (Serbia) Laslo Djere
March 30	Electra Israel Open; Ra'anana, Israel; Hard – $125,000 – 32S/32Q/16D; Singles – Doubles	(Croatia) Mate Pavić (New Zealand) Michael Venus; 6–1, 6–4	(Australia) Rameez Junaid (Canada) Adil Shamasdin	(Moldova) Radu Albot (Germany) Michael Berrer	(Russia) Evgeny Donskoy (Slovenia) Blaž Rola (Turkey) Marsel İlhan (Serbia) Laslo Djere
March 30	Open de Guadeloupe; Le Gosier, Guadeloupe; Hard – $100,000+H – 32S/16Q/16D; Singles – Doubles	(Belgium) Ruben Bemelmans; 7–6^{(8–6)}, 6–3	(France) Édouard Roger-Vasselin	(United Kingdom) Kyle Edmund (Brazil) Henrique Cunha	(Australia) Omar Jasika (France) Benoît Paire (Brazil) André Ghem (Australia) John-Patrick Smith
March 30	Open de Guadeloupe; Le Gosier, Guadeloupe; Hard – $100,000+H – 32S/16Q/16D; Singles – Doubles	(United States) James Cerretani (Netherlands) Antal van der Duim; 6–1, 6–3	(Netherlands) Wesley Koolhof (Netherlands) Matwé Middelkoop	(United Kingdom) Kyle Edmund (Brazil) Henrique Cunha	(Australia) Omar Jasika (France) Benoît Paire (Brazil) André Ghem (Australia) John-Patrick Smith
March 30	San Luis Open Challenger Tour; San Luis Potosí, Mexico; Clay – $50,000+H – 32S/32Q/16D; Singles – Doubles	(Argentina) Guido Pella; 6–3, 6–3	(Republic of Ireland) James McGee	(Australia) James Duckworth (Italy) Paolo Lorenzi	(Russia) Teymuraz Gabashvili (Spain) Adrián Menéndez Maceiras (Argentina) Andrés Molteni (Argentina) Juan Ignacio Londero
March 30	San Luis Open Challenger Tour; San Luis Potosí, Mexico; Clay – $50,000+H – 32S/32Q/16D; Singles – Doubles	(Argentina) Guillermo Durán (Argentina) Horacio Zeballos; 7–6^{(7–4)}, 6–4	(Peru) Sergio Galdós (Argentina) Guido Pella	(Australia) James Duckworth (Italy) Paolo Lorenzi	(Russia) Teymuraz Gabashvili (Spain) Adrián Menéndez Maceiras (Argentina) Andrés Molteni (Argentina) Juan Ignacio Londero

=== April ===
Week of	Tournament	Champions	Runners-up	Semifinalists	Quarterfinalists
April 6	Tennis Napoli Cup; Naples, Italy; Clay – €106,500+H – 32S/26Q/16D; Singles – Doubles	(Spain) Daniel Muñoz de la Nava; 6–2, 6–1	(Italy) Matteo Donati	(Italy) Marco Cecchinato (Italy) Thomas Fabbiano	(Italy) Andrea Arnaboldi (Italy) Gianluigi Quinzi (Georgia (country)) Nikoloz Basilashvili (Spain) Rubén Ramírez Hidalgo
April 6	Tennis Napoli Cup; Naples, Italy; Clay – €106,500+H – 32S/26Q/16D; Singles – Doubles	(Serbia) Ilija Bozoljac (Serbia) Filip Krajinović; 6–1, 6–2	(Georgia (country)) Nikoloz Basilashvili (Belarus) Aliaksandr Bury	(Italy) Marco Cecchinato (Italy) Thomas Fabbiano	(Italy) Andrea Arnaboldi (Italy) Gianluigi Quinzi (Georgia (country)) Nikoloz Basilashvili (Spain) Rubén Ramírez Hidalgo
April 6	Torneo Internacional Challenger León; León, Mexico; Hard – $75,000+H – 32S/32Q/16D; Singles – Doubles	(United States) Austin Krajicek; 6–7^{(3–7)}, 7–6^{(7–5)}, 6–4	(Spain) Adrián Menéndez Maceiras	(Argentina) Horacio Zeballos (Colombia) Alejandro Falla	(Austria) Gerald Melzer (United States) Daniel Nguyen (United States) Adam El Mihdawy (Ecuador) Giovanni Lapentti
April 6	Torneo Internacional Challenger León; León, Mexico; Hard – $75,000+H – 32S/32Q/16D; Singles – Doubles	(United States) Austin Krajicek (United States) Rajeev Ram; 6–2, 7–5	(Argentina) Guillermo Durán (Argentina) Horacio Zeballos	(Argentina) Horacio Zeballos (Colombia) Alejandro Falla	(Austria) Gerald Melzer (United States) Daniel Nguyen (United States) Adam El Mihdawy (Ecuador) Giovanni Lapentti
April 6	Batman Cup; Batman, Turkey; Hard – €42,500 – 32S/10Q/16D; Singles – Doubles	(Israel) Dudi Sela; 6–7^{(5–7)}, 6–3, 6–3	(Slovenia) Blaž Kavčič	(Japan) Hiroki Moriya (India) Saketh Myneni	(Moldova) Radu Albot (Australia) Matthew Ebden (Serbia) Nikola Milojević (Bosnia and Herzegovina) Mirza Bašić
April 6	Batman Cup; Batman, Turkey; Hard – €42,500 – 32S/10Q/16D; Singles – Doubles	(Russia) Aslan Karatsev (Belarus) Yaraslav Shyla; 7–6^{(7–4)}, 4–6, [10–5]	(Croatia) Mate Pavić (New Zealand) Michael Venus	(Japan) Hiroki Moriya (India) Saketh Myneni	(Moldova) Radu Albot (Australia) Matthew Ebden (Serbia) Nikola Milojević (Bosnia and Herzegovina) Mirza Bašić
April 6	Open Harmonie mutuelle Saint-Brieuc, France; Hard (i) – €35,000+H – 32S/21Q/16D; Singles – Doubles	(France) Nicolas Mahut; 3–6, 7–6^{(7–3)}, 6–4	(Japan) Yūichi Sugita	(France) Lucas Pouille (France) Constant Lestienne	(Croatia) Nikola Mektić (France) Rémi Boutillier (France) Vincent Millot (Netherlands) Jesse Huta Galung
April 6	Open Harmonie mutuelle Saint-Brieuc, France; Hard (i) – €35,000+H – 32S/21Q/16D; Singles – Doubles	(France) Grégoire Burquier (France) Alexandre Sidorenko; 6–3, 6–4	(Poland) Andriej Kapaś (Japan) Yasutaka Uchiyama	(France) Lucas Pouille (France) Constant Lestienne	(Croatia) Nikola Mektić (France) Rémi Boutillier (France) Vincent Millot (Netherlands) Jesse Huta Galung
April 13	Sarasota Open; Sarasota, United States; Clay – $100,000 (green) – 32S/32Q/16D; Singles – Doubles	(Argentina) Federico Delbonis; 6–4, 6–2	(Argentina) Facundo Bagnis	(United States) Chase Buchanan (Argentina) Renzo Olivo	(Republic of Ireland) James McGee (United States) Frances Tiafoe (Australia) Jason Kubler (United States) Jared Donaldson
April 13	Sarasota Open; Sarasota, United States; Clay – $100,000 (green) – 32S/32Q/16D; Singles – Doubles	(Argentina) Facundo Argüello (Argentina) Facundo Bagnis; 3–6, 6–2, [13–11]	(South Korea) Chung Hyeon (India) Divij Sharan	(United States) Chase Buchanan (Argentina) Renzo Olivo	(Republic of Ireland) James McGee (United States) Frances Tiafoe (Australia) Jason Kubler (United States) Jared Donaldson
April 13	Mersin Cup; Mersin, Turkey; Clay – €42,500 – 32S/32Q/16D; Singles – Doubles	(Belgium) Kimmer Coppejans; 6–2, 6–2	(Turkey) Marsel İlhan	(Serbia) Filip Krajinović (Spain) Íñigo Cervantes	(France) Constant Lestienne (Romania) Victor Hănescu (Japan) Taro Daniel (Croatia) Antonio Veić
April 13	Mersin Cup; Mersin, Turkey; Clay – €42,500 – 32S/32Q/16D; Singles – Doubles	(Croatia) Mate Pavić (New Zealand) Michael Venus; 5–7, 6–3, [10–4]	(Italy) Riccardo Ghedin (India) Ramkumar Ramanathan	(Serbia) Filip Krajinović (Spain) Íñigo Cervantes	(France) Constant Lestienne (Romania) Victor Hănescu (Japan) Taro Daniel (Croatia) Antonio Veić
April 20	Zurich Jalisco Open presentado por Aeroméxico y Lacoste; Guadalajara, Mexico; Hard – $100,000+H – 32S/26Q/16D; Singles – Doubles	(United States) Rajeev Ram; 6–1, 6–2	(United States) Jason Jung	(United States) Kevin King (United States) Connor Smith	(Spain) Adrián Menéndez Maceiras (El Salvador) Marcelo Arévalo (United States) Adam El Mihdawy (Australia) John-Patrick Smith
April 20	Zurich Jalisco Open presentado por Aeroméxico y Lacoste; Guadalajara, Mexico; Hard – $100,000+H – 32S/26Q/16D; Singles – Doubles	(United States) Austin Krajicek (United States) Rajeev Ram; 7–5, 4–6, [10–6]	(Brazil) Marcelo Demoliner (Mexico) Miguel Ángel Reyes-Varela	(United States) Kevin King (United States) Connor Smith	(Spain) Adrián Menéndez Maceiras (El Salvador) Marcelo Arévalo (United States) Adam El Mihdawy (Australia) John-Patrick Smith
April 20	Campeonato Internacional de Santos; Santos, Brazil; Clay – $50,000 – 32S/32Q/16D; Singles – Doubles	(Slovenia) Blaž Rola; 6–3, 3–6, 6–3	(Belgium) Germain Gigounon	(Brazil) Orlando Luz (Argentina) Guido Pella	(Argentina) Agustín Velotti (Brazil) André Ghem (Argentina) Andrés Molteni (Brazil) Pedro Sakamoto
April 20	Campeonato Internacional de Santos; Santos, Brazil; Clay – $50,000 – 32S/32Q/16D; Singles – Doubles	(Argentina) Máximo González (Venezuela) Roberto Maytín; 6–4, 7–6^{(7–4)}	(Argentina) Andrés Molteni (Argentina) Guido Pella	(Brazil) Orlando Luz (Argentina) Guido Pella	(Argentina) Agustín Velotti (Brazil) André Ghem (Argentina) Andrés Molteni (Brazil) Pedro Sakamoto
April 20	St. Joseph's/Candler Savannah Challenger; Savannah, United States; Clay – $50,000 (green) – 32S/24Q/16D; Singles – Doubles	(South Korea) Chung Hyeon; 6–3, 6–2	(Republic of Ireland) James McGee	(United States) Frances Tiafoe (United States) Bjorn Fratangelo	(United States) Tim Smyczek (United States) Mitchell Krueger (Portugal) Gastão Elias (United States) Jared Donaldson
April 20	St. Joseph's/Candler Savannah Challenger; Savannah, United States; Clay – $50,000 (green) – 32S/24Q/16D; Singles – Doubles	(Argentina) Guillermo Durán (Argentina) Horacio Zeballos; 6–4, 6–3	(United States) Dennis Novikov (Chile) Julio Peralta	(United States) Frances Tiafoe (United States) Bjorn Fratangelo	(United States) Tim Smyczek (United States) Mitchell Krueger (Portugal) Gastão Elias (United States) Jared Donaldson
April 20	Città di Vercelli – Trofeo Multimed; Vercelli, Italy; Clay – €42,500 – 32S/32Q/16D; Singles – Doubles	(Japan) Taro Daniel; 6–3, 1–6, 6–4	(Italy) Filippo Volandri	(Spain) Rubén Ramírez Hidalgo (Italy) Marco Cecchinato	(Croatia) Antonio Veić (United Kingdom) Kyle Edmund (Italy) Salvatore Caruso (Belgium) Arthur De Greef
April 20	Città di Vercelli – Trofeo Multimed; Vercelli, Italy; Clay – €42,500 – 32S/32Q/16D; Singles – Doubles	(Italy) Andrea Arnaboldi (Chile) Hans Podlipnik; 6–7^{(5–7)}, 7–5, [10–3]	(Belarus) Sergey Betov (Russia) Mikhail Elgin	(Spain) Rubén Ramírez Hidalgo (Italy) Marco Cecchinato	(Croatia) Antonio Veić (United Kingdom) Kyle Edmund (Italy) Salvatore Caruso (Belgium) Arthur De Greef
April 27	Santaizi ATP Challenger; Taipei City, Taiwan; Carpet (i) – $75,000+H – 32S/14Q/16D; Singles – Doubles	(Australia) Sam Groth; 6–7^{(5–7)}, 6–4, 7–6^{(7–3)}	(Russia) Konstantin Kravchuk	(Australia) Matthew Ebden (India) Yuki Bhambri	(Chinese Taipei) Lu Yen-hsun (Ukraine) Illya Marchenko (Japan) Go Soeda (Japan) Tatsuma Ito
April 27	Santaizi ATP Challenger; Taipei City, Taiwan; Carpet (i) – $75,000+H – 32S/14Q/16D; Singles – Doubles	(Australia) Matthew Ebden (Chinese Taipei) Wang Chieh-fu; 6–1, 6–4	(Thailand) Sanchai Ratiwatana (Thailand) Sonchat Ratiwatana	(Australia) Matthew Ebden (India) Yuki Bhambri	(Chinese Taipei) Lu Yen-hsun (Ukraine) Illya Marchenko (Japan) Go Soeda (Japan) Tatsuma Ito
April 27	Anning Open; Anning, China; Clay – $50,000+H – 32S/20Q/16D; Singles – Doubles	(Croatia) Franko Škugor; 7–5, 6–2	(Australia) Gavin van Peperzeel	(Slovenia) Grega Žemlja (Chinese Taipei) Yang Tsung-hua	(Australia) James Duckworth (China) Wu Di (South Korea) Lee Duck-hee (China) Bai Yan
April 27	Anning Open; Anning, China; Clay – $50,000+H – 32S/20Q/16D; Singles – Doubles	(China) Bai Yan (China) Wu Di; 6–3, 6–4	(India) Karunuday Singh (Australia) Andrew Whittington	(Slovenia) Grega Žemlja (Chinese Taipei) Yang Tsung-hua	(Australia) James Duckworth (China) Wu Di (South Korea) Lee Duck-hee (China) Bai Yan
April 27	São Paulo Challenger de Tênis; São Paulo, Brazil; Clay – $50,000 – 32S/32Q/16D; Singles – Doubles	(Argentina) Guido Pella; 7–5, 7–6^{(7–1)}	(Sweden) Christian Lindell	(Argentina) Guido Andreozzi (Dominican Republic) José Hernández	(Belgium) Germain Gigounon (Chile) Gonzalo Lama (Brazil) Orlando Luz (Brazil) Rogério Dutra Silva
April 27	São Paulo Challenger de Tênis; São Paulo, Brazil; Clay – $50,000 – 32S/32Q/16D; Singles – Doubles	(United States) Chase Buchanan (Slovenia) Blaž Rola; 6–4, 6–4	(Argentina) Guido Andreozzi (Peru) Sergio Galdós	(Argentina) Guido Andreozzi (Dominican Republic) José Hernández	(Belgium) Germain Gigounon (Chile) Gonzalo Lama (Brazil) Orlando Luz (Brazil) Rogério Dutra Silva
April 27	Tallahassee Tennis Challenger; Tallahassee, United States; Clay – $50,000 (green) – 32S/15Q/16D; Singles – Doubles	(Argentina) Facundo Argüello; 2–6, 7–6^{(7–5)}, 6–4	(United States) Frances Tiafoe	(United States) Tennys Sandgren (United States) Jared Donaldson	(Ecuador) Emilio Gómez (United States) Bjorn Fratangelo (France) Vincent Millot (United States) Mitchell Krueger
April 27	Tallahassee Tennis Challenger; Tallahassee, United States; Clay – $50,000 (green) – 32S/15Q/16D; Singles – Doubles	(United States) Dennis Novikov (Chile) Julio Peralta; 6–2, 6–4	(India) Somdev Devvarman (India) Sanam Singh	(United States) Tennys Sandgren (United States) Jared Donaldson	(Ecuador) Emilio Gómez (United States) Bjorn Fratangelo (France) Vincent Millot (United States) Mitchell Krueger
April 27	ATP Challenger Torino; Turin, Italy; Clay – €42,500+H – 32S/22Q/16D; Singles – Doubles	(Italy) Marco Cecchinato; 6–2, 6–3	(Belgium) Kimmer Coppejans	(France) Maxime Hamou (Romania) Adrian Ungur	(Netherlands) Jesse Huta Galung (Russia) Aslan Karatsev (United Kingdom) Kyle Edmund (Italy) Gianluca Naso
April 27	ATP Challenger Torino; Turin, Italy; Clay – €42,500+H – 32S/22Q/16D; Singles – Doubles	(Netherlands) Wesley Koolhof (Netherlands) Matwé Middelkoop; 4–6, 6–3, [10–5]	(Croatia) Dino Marcan (Croatia) Antonio Šančić	(France) Maxime Hamou (Romania) Adrian Ungur	(Netherlands) Jesse Huta Galung (Russia) Aslan Karatsev (United Kingdom) Kyle Edmund (Italy) Gianluca Naso
April 27	Prosperita Open; Ostrava, Czech Republic; Clay – €42,500 – 32S/26Q/16D; Singles – Doubles	(Spain) Íñigo Cervantes; 7–6^{(7–5)}, 6–4	(Czech Republic) Adam Pavlásek	(Spain) Daniel Muñoz de la Nava (Spain) Rubén Ramírez Hidalgo	(France) Lucas Pouille (Chile) Hans Podlipnik (Slovakia) Jozef Kovalík (Slovakia) Andrej Martin
April 27	Prosperita Open; Ostrava, Czech Republic; Clay – €42,500 – 32S/26Q/16D; Singles – Doubles	(Slovakia) Andrej Martin (Chile) Hans Podlipnik; 4–6, 7–5, [10–1]	(Czech Republic) Roman Jebavý (Czech Republic) Jan Šátral	(Spain) Daniel Muñoz de la Nava (Spain) Rubén Ramírez Hidalgo	(France) Lucas Pouille (Chile) Hans Podlipnik (Slovakia) Jozef Kovalík (Slovakia) Andrej Martin

=== May ===
Week of	Tournament	Champions	Runners-up	Semifinalists	Quarterfinalists
May 4	Busan Open; Busan, South Korea; Hard – $100,000+H – 32S/27Q/16D; Singles – Doubles	(South Korea) Chung Hyeon; 6–3, 6–1	(Slovakia) Lukáš Lacko	(Slovenia) Grega Žemlja (China) Zhang Ze	(South Korea) Nam Ji-sung (Denmark) Frederik Nielsen (Japan) Go Soeda (Croatia) Franco Škugor
May 4	Busan Open; Busan, South Korea; Hard – $100,000+H – 32S/27Q/16D; Singles – Doubles	(Thailand) Sanchai Ratiwatana (Thailand) Sonchat Ratiwatana; 7–6^{(7–2)}, 3–6, [10–7]	(South Korea) Nam Ji-sung (South Korea) Song Min-kyu	(Slovenia) Grega Žemlja (China) Zhang Ze	(South Korea) Nam Ji-sung (Denmark) Frederik Nielsen (Japan) Go Soeda (Croatia) Franco Škugor
May 4	Open du Pays d'Aix; Aix-en-Provence, France; Clay – €64,000+H – 32S/15Q/16D; Singles – Doubles	(Netherlands) Robin Haase; 7–6^{(7–1)}, 6–2	(France) Paul-Henri Mathieu	(Germany) Alexander Zverev (Tunisia) Malek Jaziri	(Australia) John Millman (Brazil) André Ghem (France) Jonathan Eysseric (France) Laurent Rochette
May 4	Open du Pays d'Aix; Aix-en-Provence, France; Clay – €64,000+H – 32S/15Q/16D; Singles – Doubles	(Netherlands) Robin Haase (Pakistan) Aisam-ul-Haq Qureshi; 6–1, 6–2	(United States) Nicholas Monroe (New Zealand) Artem Sitak	(Germany) Alexander Zverev (Tunisia) Malek Jaziri	(Australia) John Millman (Brazil) André Ghem (France) Jonathan Eysseric (France) Laurent Rochette
May 4	Seguros Bolívar Open Cali; Cali, Colombia; Clay – $50,000+H – 32S/25Q/16D; Singles – Doubles	(Brazil) Fernando Romboli; 4–6, 6–3, 6–2	(Ecuador) Giovanni Lapentti	(Colombia) Nicolás Barrientos (Chile) Nicolás Jarry	(Slovenia) Blaž Rola (El Salvador) Marcelo Arévalo (Dominican Republic) José Hernández (Chile) Gonzalo Lama
May 4	Seguros Bolívar Open Cali; Cali, Colombia; Clay – $50,000+H – 32S/25Q/16D; Singles – Doubles	(Brazil) Marcelo Demoliner (Mexico) Miguel Ángel Reyes-Varela; 6–1, 6–2	(Ecuador) Emilio Gómez (Venezuela) Roberto Maytín	(Colombia) Nicolás Barrientos (Chile) Nicolás Jarry	(Slovenia) Blaž Rola (El Salvador) Marcelo Arévalo (Dominican Republic) José Hernández (Chile) Gonzalo Lama
May 4	Karshi Challenger; Qarshi, Uzbekistan; Hard – $50,000+H – 32S/21Q/16D; Singles – Doubles	(Russia) Teymuraz Gabashvili; 5–2 retired	(Russia) Evgeny Donskoy	(Russia) Aslan Karatsev (Australia) Matthew Ebden	(India) Yuki Bhambri (Italy) Riccardo Ghedin (Spain) Adrián Menéndez Maceiras (Bosnia and Herzegovina) Aldin Šetkić
May 4	Karshi Challenger; Qarshi, Uzbekistan; Hard – $50,000+H – 32S/21Q/16D; Singles – Doubles	(India) Yuki Bhambri (Spain) Adrián Menéndez Maceiras; 5–7, 6–3, [10–8]	(Belarus) Sergey Betov (Russia) Mikhail Elgin	(Russia) Aslan Karatsev (Australia) Matthew Ebden	(India) Yuki Bhambri (Italy) Riccardo Ghedin (Spain) Adrián Menéndez Maceiras (Bosnia and Herzegovina) Aldin Šetkić
May 4	Garden Open; Rome, Italy; Clay – €42,500+H – 32S/22Q/16D; Singles – Doubles	(United Kingdom) Aljaž Bedene; 7–5, 6–2	(Czech Republic) Adam Pavlásek	(Italy) Potito Starace (Italy) Marco Cecchinato	(Japan) Taro Daniel (United Kingdom) Kyle Edmund (Romania) Adrian Ungur (Germany) Dustin Brown
May 4	Garden Open; Rome, Italy; Clay – €42,500+H – 32S/22Q/16D; Singles – Doubles	(Germany) Dustin Brown (Czech Republic) František Čermák; 6–1, 6–2	(Argentina) Andrés Molteni (Argentina) Marco Trungelliti	(Italy) Potito Starace (Italy) Marco Cecchinato	(Japan) Taro Daniel (United Kingdom) Kyle Edmund (Romania) Adrian Ungur (Germany) Dustin Brown
May 11	BNP Paribas Primrose Bordeaux; Bordeaux, France; Clay – €85,000+H – 32S/18Q/16D; Singles – Doubles	(Australia) Thanasi Kokkinakis; 6–4, 1–6, 7–6^{(7–5)}	(Netherlands) Thiemo de Bakker	(France) Jonathan Eysseric (Estonia) Jürgen Zopp	(Slovakia) Norbert Gombos (France) Lucas Pouille (Brazil) André Ghem (Spain) Roberto Carballés Baena
May 11	BNP Paribas Primrose Bordeaux; Bordeaux, France; Clay – €85,000+H – 32S/18Q/16D; Singles – Doubles	(Netherlands) Thiemo de Bakker (Netherlands) Robin Haase; 6–3, 7–5	(France) Lucas Pouille (Ukraine) Sergiy Stakhovsky	(France) Jonathan Eysseric (Estonia) Jürgen Zopp	(Slovakia) Norbert Gombos (France) Lucas Pouille (Brazil) André Ghem (Spain) Roberto Carballés Baena
May 11	Heilbronner Neckarcup; Heilbronn, Germany; Clay – €42,500+H – 32S/24Q/16D; Singles – Doubles	(Germany) Alexander Zverev; 6–1, 7–6^{(9–7)}	(Argentina) Guido Pella	(Japan) Yoshihito Nishioka (Germany) Jan-Lennard Struff	(Germany) Andreas Beck (Slovakia) Jozef Kovalík (United States) Bjorn Fratangelo (Germany) Matthias Bachinger
May 11	Heilbronner Neckarcup; Heilbronn, Germany; Clay – €42,500+H – 32S/24Q/16D; Singles – Doubles	(Poland) Mateusz Kowalczyk (Slovakia) Igor Zelenay; 6–4, 6–3	(Germany) Dominik Meffert (Germany) Tim Pütz	(Japan) Yoshihito Nishioka (Germany) Jan-Lennard Struff	(Germany) Andreas Beck (Slovakia) Jozef Kovalík (United States) Bjorn Fratangelo (Germany) Matthias Bachinger
May 11	Samarkand Challenger; Samarkand, Uzbekistan; Clay – $50,000+H – 32S/22Q/16D; Singles – Doubles	(Russia) Teymuraz Gabashvili; 6–3, 6–1	(India) Yuki Bhambri	(Australia) Matthew Ebden (India) Saketh Myneni	(United Kingdom) Liam Broady (Netherlands) Boy Westerhof (Spain) Adrián Menéndez Maceiras (United Kingdom) Brydan Klein
May 11	Samarkand Challenger; Samarkand, Uzbekistan; Clay – $50,000+H – 32S/22Q/16D; Singles – Doubles	(Belarus) Sergey Betov (Russia) Mikhail Elgin; 6–4, 6–3	(Serbia) Laslo Djere (Serbia) Peđa Krstin	(Australia) Matthew Ebden (India) Saketh Myneni	(United Kingdom) Liam Broady (Netherlands) Boy Westerhof (Spain) Adrián Menéndez Maceiras (United Kingdom) Brydan Klein
May 11	Lecoq Seoul Open; Seoul, South Korea; Hard – $50,000 – 32S/32Q/16D; Singles – Doubles	(Japan) Go Soeda; 3–6, 6–3, 6–3	(South Korea) Chung Hyeon	(Chinese Taipei) Lu Yen-hsun (China) Zhang Ze	(China) Wu Di (United States) Denis Kudla (Bulgaria) Dimitar Kutrovsky (South Korea) Lee Duck-hee
May 11	Lecoq Seoul Open; Seoul, South Korea; Hard – $50,000 – 32S/32Q/16D; Singles – Doubles	(China) Gong Maoxin (Chinese Taipei) Peng Hsien-yin; 6–4, 7–5	(South Korea) Lee Hyung-taik (Thailand) Danai Udomchoke	(Chinese Taipei) Lu Yen-hsun (China) Zhang Ze	(China) Wu Di (United States) Denis Kudla (Bulgaria) Dimitar Kutrovsky (South Korea) Lee Duck-hee
May 18	Eskişehir Cup; Eskişehir, Turkey; Hard – €42,500 – 32S/16Q/16D; Singles – Doubles	(Italy) Paolo Lorenzi; 7–6^{(7–4)}, 7–6^{(7–5)}	(Spain) Íñigo Cervantes	(France) Rémi Boutillier (France) Yannick Jankovits	(Australia) Matthew Ebden (Serbia) Peđa Krstin (Switzerland) Marco Chiudinelli (Switzerland) Adrien Bossel
May 18	Eskişehir Cup; Eskişehir, Turkey; Hard – €42,500 – 32S/16Q/16D; Singles – Doubles	(Belarus) Sergey Betov (Russia) Mikhail Elgin; 6–4, 6–7^{(2–7)}, [10–7]	(Chinese Taipei) Chen Ti (South Africa) Ruan Roelofse	(France) Rémi Boutillier (France) Yannick Jankovits	(Australia) Matthew Ebden (Serbia) Peđa Krstin (Switzerland) Marco Chiudinelli (Switzerland) Adrien Bossel
May 25	Internazionali di Tennis Città di Vicenza; Vicenza, Italy; Clay – €42,500 – 32S/26Q/16D; Singles – Doubles	(Spain) Íñigo Cervantes; 6–4, 6–2	(Australia) John Millman	(Netherlands) Thiemo de Bakker (United States) Bjorn Fratangelo	(Argentina) Facundo Bagnis (Argentina) Pedro Cachin (Argentina) Guido Pella (Argentina) Guido Andreozzi
May 25	Internazionali di Tennis Città di Vicenza; Vicenza, Italy; Clay – €42,500 – 32S/26Q/16D; Singles – Doubles	(Argentina) Facundo Bagnis (Argentina) Guido Pella; 6–2, 6–4	(Italy) Salvatore Caruso (Italy) Federico Gaio	(Netherlands) Thiemo de Bakker (United States) Bjorn Fratangelo	(Argentina) Facundo Bagnis (Argentina) Pedro Cachin (Argentina) Guido Pella (Argentina) Guido Andreozzi

=== June ===
Week of	Tournament	Champions	Runners-up	Semifinalists	Quarterfinalists
June 1	UniCredit Czech Open; Prostějov, Czech Republic; Clay – €106,500+H – 32S/31Q/16D; Singles – Doubles	(Czech Republic) Jiří Veselý; 6–4, 6–2	(Serbia) Laslo Djere	(Brazil) João Souza (Belarus) Uladzimir Ignatik	(Serbia) Dušan Lajović (Spain) Marcel Granollers (Brazil) André Ghem (Serbia) Filip Krajinović
June 1	UniCredit Czech Open; Prostějov, Czech Republic; Clay – €106,500+H – 32S/31Q/16D; Singles – Doubles	(Austria) Julian Knowle (Austria) Philipp Oswald; 4–6, 6–3, [11–9]	(Poland) Mateusz Kowalczyk (Slovakia) Igor Zelenay	(Brazil) João Souza (Belarus) Uladzimir Ignatik	(Serbia) Dušan Lajović (Spain) Marcel Granollers (Brazil) André Ghem (Serbia) Filip Krajinović
June 1	Franken Challenge; Fürth, Germany; Clay – €42,500 – 32S/32Q/16D; Singles – Doubles	(Japan) Taro Daniel; 6–3, 6–0	(Spain) Albert Montañés	(Spain) Albert Ramos (Slovenia) Blaž Rola	(Spain) Íñigo Cervantes (Sweden) Elias Ymer (Argentina) Horacio Zeballos (Italy) Lorenzo Giustino
June 1	Franken Challenge; Fürth, Germany; Clay – €42,500 – 32S/32Q/16D; Singles – Doubles	(Argentina) Guillermo Durán (Argentina) Horacio Zeballos; 6–1, 6–3	(Spain) Íñigo Cervantes (Argentina) Renzo Olivo	(Spain) Albert Ramos (Slovenia) Blaž Rola	(Spain) Íñigo Cervantes (Sweden) Elias Ymer (Argentina) Horacio Zeballos (Italy) Lorenzo Giustino
June 1	Gimcheon Open ATP Challenger; Gimcheon, South Korea; Hard – $50,000 – 32S/19Q/16D; Singles – Doubles	(United States) Alexander Sarkissian; 7–6^{(7–5)}, 6–4	(United States) Connor Smith	(South Korea) Kim Cheong-eui (Japan) Hiroyasu Ehara	(Australia) Christopher O'Connell (South Korea) Kim Young-seok (South Korea) Nam Ji-sung (New Zealand) Jose Rubin Statham
June 1	Gimcheon Open ATP Challenger; Gimcheon, South Korea; Hard – $50,000 – 32S/19Q/16D; Singles – Doubles	(China) Li Zhe (New Zealand) Jose Rubin Statham; 6–4, 6–2	(South Africa) Dean O'Brien (South Africa) Ruan Roelofse	(South Korea) Kim Cheong-eui (Japan) Hiroyasu Ehara	(Australia) Christopher O'Connell (South Korea) Kim Young-seok (South Korea) Nam Ji-sung (New Zealand) Jose Rubin Statham
June 1	Aegon Manchester Trophy; Manchester, United Kingdom; Grass – €42,500 – 32S/21Q/16D; Singles – Doubles	(Australia) Sam Groth; 7–5, 6–1	(Australia) Luke Saville	(Russia) Konstantin Kravchuk (United States) Rajeev Ram	(United Kingdom) Brydan Klein (Australia) Matthew Ebden (United Kingdom) Joshua Milton (United Kingdom) James Ward
June 1	Aegon Manchester Trophy; Manchester, United Kingdom; Grass – €42,500 – 32S/21Q/16D; Singles – Doubles	(Australia) Chris Guccione (Brazil) André Sá; Walkover	(South Africa) Raven Klaasen (United States) Rajeev Ram	(Russia) Konstantin Kravchuk (United States) Rajeev Ram	(United Kingdom) Brydan Klein (Australia) Matthew Ebden (United Kingdom) Joshua Milton (United Kingdom) James Ward
June 1	Venice Challenge Save Cup; Mestre, Italy; Clay – €42,500 – 32S/31Q/16D; Singles – Doubles	(Argentina) Máximo González; 6–1, 6–3	(Slovakia) Jozef Kovalík	(Italy) Paolo Lorenzi (Dominican Republic) José Hernández	(Chile) Nicolás Jarry (Spain) Roberto Carballés Baena (Italy) Potito Starace (France) Calvin Hemery
June 1	Venice Challenge Save Cup; Mestre, Italy; Clay – €42,500 – 32S/31Q/16D; Singles – Doubles	(Italy) Flavio Cipolla (Italy) Potito Starace; 5–7, 7–6^{(7–3)}, [10–4]	(Argentina) Facundo Bagnis (Peru) Sergio Galdós	(Italy) Paolo Lorenzi (Dominican Republic) José Hernández	(Chile) Nicolás Jarry (Spain) Roberto Carballés Baena (Italy) Potito Starace (France) Calvin Hemery
June 8	Città di Caltanissetta; Caltanissetta, Italy; Clay – €106,500+H – 32S/19Q/16D; Singles – Doubles	(Sweden) Elias Ymer; 6–3, 6–2	(United States) Bjorn Fratangelo	(Spain) Albert Ramos (Italy) Marco Cecchinato	(Portugal) Gastão Elias (Argentina) Guido Pella (Colombia) Alejandro González (Brazil) Guilherme Clezar
June 8	Città di Caltanissetta; Caltanissetta, Italy; Clay – €106,500+H – 32S/19Q/16D; Singles – Doubles	(Argentina) Guido Andreozzi (Argentina) Guillermo Durán; 6–3, 6–2	(Chinese Taipei) Lee Hsin-han (Italy) Alessandro Motti	(Spain) Albert Ramos (Italy) Marco Cecchinato	(Portugal) Gastão Elias (Argentina) Guido Pella (Colombia) Alejandro González (Brazil) Guilherme Clezar
June 8	Hoff Open; Moscow, Russia; Clay – $50,000+H – 32S/19Q/16D; Singles – Doubles	(Spain) Daniel Muñoz de la Nava; 6–0, 6–1	(Moldova) Radu Albot	(Argentina) Horacio Zeballos (Russia) Andrey Rublev	(Spain) Marcel Granollers (Bosnia and Herzegovina) Damir Džumhur (Russia) Evgeny Donskoy (Russia) Teymuraz Gabashvili
June 8	Hoff Open; Moscow, Russia; Clay – $50,000+H – 32S/19Q/16D; Singles – Doubles	(Argentina) Renzo Olivo (Argentina) Horacio Zeballos; 7–5, 6–3	(Chile) Julio Peralta (United States) Matt Seeberger	(Argentina) Horacio Zeballos (Russia) Andrey Rublev	(Spain) Marcel Granollers (Bosnia and Herzegovina) Damir Džumhur (Russia) Evgeny Donskoy (Russia) Teymuraz Gabashvili
June 8	Sparta Prague Open; Prague, Czech Republic; Clay – €42,500+H – 32S/32Q/16D; Singles – Doubles	(Slovakia) Norbert Gombos; 7–6^{(7–5)}, 5–7, 7–6^{(7–2)}	(Spain) Albert Montañés	(Kazakhstan) Aleksandr Nedovyesov (Belgium) Kimmer Coppejans	(Slovakia) Jozef Kovalík (Japan) Taro Daniel (Hungary) Márton Fucsovics (Spain) Íñigo Cervantes
June 8	Sparta Prague Open; Prague, Czech Republic; Clay – €42,500+H – 32S/32Q/16D; Singles – Doubles	(Poland) Mateusz Kowalczyk (Slovakia) Igor Zelenay; 6–2, 7–6^{(7–5)}	(Venezuela) Roberto Maytín (Mexico) Miguel Ángel Reyes-Varela	(Kazakhstan) Aleksandr Nedovyesov (Belgium) Kimmer Coppejans	(Slovakia) Jozef Kovalík (Japan) Taro Daniel (Hungary) Márton Fucsovics (Spain) Íñigo Cervantes
June 8	Aegon Surbiton Trophy; Surbiton, United Kingdom; Grass – €42,500 – 32S/31Q/16D; Singles – Doubles	(Australia) Matthew Ebden; 6–7^{(4–7)}, 6–4, 7–6^{(7–5)}	(United States) Denis Kudla	(Republic of Ireland) James McGee (United Kingdom) Brydan Klein	(United Kingdom) Joshua Milton (United States) Ryan Harrison (Japan) Yoshihito Nishioka (Australia) John-Patrick Smith
June 8	Aegon Surbiton Trophy; Surbiton, United Kingdom; Grass – €42,500 – 32S/31Q/16D; Singles – Doubles	(United Kingdom) Ken Skupski (United Kingdom) Neal Skupski; 6–3, 6–4	(New Zealand) Marcus Daniell (Brazil) Marcelo Demoliner	(Republic of Ireland) James McGee (United Kingdom) Brydan Klein	(United Kingdom) Joshua Milton (United States) Ryan Harrison (Japan) Yoshihito Nishioka (Australia) John-Patrick Smith
June 15	Poprad-Tatry ATP Challenger Tour; Poprad, Slovakia; Clay – €42,500+H – 32S/25Q/16D; Singles – Doubles	(Czech Republic) Adam Pavlásek; 6–2, 3–6, 6–3	(Chile) Hans Podlipnik	(Slovakia) Norbert Gombos (Brazil) André Ghem	(Belarus) Uladzimir Ignatik (Germany) Peter Torebko (Croatia) Antonio Veić (Czech Republic) Jan Šátral
June 15	Poprad-Tatry ATP Challenger Tour; Poprad, Slovakia; Clay – €42,500+H – 32S/25Q/16D; Singles – Doubles	(Czech Republic) Roman Jebavý (Czech Republic) Jan Šátral; 6–2, 6–2	(Slovakia) Norbert Gombos (Czech Republic) Adam Pavlásek	(Slovakia) Norbert Gombos (Brazil) André Ghem	(Belarus) Uladzimir Ignatik (Germany) Peter Torebko (Croatia) Antonio Veić (Czech Republic) Jan Šátral
June 15	Fergana Challenger; Fergana, Uzbekistan; Hard – $50,000+H – 32S/19Q/16D; Singles – Doubles	(Russia) Teymuraz Gabashvili; 6–2, 1–0 retired	(Russia) Alexander Kudryavtsev	(Chinese Taipei) Chen Ti (Moldova) Radu Albot	(Russia) Karen Khachanov (Serbia) Nikola Milojević (Ukraine) Denys Molchanov (Bosnia and Herzegovina) Aldin Šetkić
June 15	Fergana Challenger; Fergana, Uzbekistan; Hard – $50,000+H – 32S/19Q/16D; Singles – Doubles	(Belarus) Sergey Betov (Russia) Mikhail Elgin; 6–3, 7–5	(Ukraine) Denys Molchanov (Croatia) Franko Škugor	(Chinese Taipei) Chen Ti (Moldova) Radu Albot	(Russia) Karen Khachanov (Serbia) Nikola Milojević (Ukraine) Denys Molchanov (Bosnia and Herzegovina) Aldin Šetkić
June 15	Aegon Ilkley Trophy; Ilkley, United Kingdom; Grass – €42,500 – 32S/32Q/16D; Singles – Doubles	(United States) Denis Kudla; 6–3, 6–4	(Australia) Matthew Ebden	(Republic of Ireland) James McGee (Croatia) Ivan Dodig	(Bosnia and Herzegovina) Mirza Bašić (United Kingdom) Joshua Milton (Russia) Andrey Kuznetsov (Israel) Dudi Sela
June 15	Aegon Ilkley Trophy; Ilkley, United Kingdom; Grass – €42,500 – 32S/32Q/16D; Singles – Doubles	(New Zealand) Marcus Daniell (Brazil) Marcelo Demoliner; 7–6^{(7–3)}, 6–4	(United Kingdom) Ken Skupski (United Kingdom) Neal Skupski	(Republic of Ireland) James McGee (Croatia) Ivan Dodig	(Bosnia and Herzegovina) Mirza Bašić (United Kingdom) Joshua Milton (Russia) Andrey Kuznetsov (Israel) Dudi Sela
June 15	Blu-Express.com Tennis Cup; Perugia, Italy; Clay – €42,500+H – 32S/19Q/16D; Singles – Doubles	(Spain) Pablo Carreño Busta; 6–2, 6–2	(Italy) Matteo Viola	(Italy) Marco Cecchinato (Italy) Filippo Volandri	(Dominican Republic) José Hernández (Spain) Rubén Ramírez Hidalgo (Chinese Taipei) Yang Tsung-hua (Spain) Roberto Carballés Baena
June 15	Blu-Express.com Tennis Cup; Perugia, Italy; Clay – €42,500+H – 32S/19Q/16D; Singles – Doubles	(Argentina) Andrea Collarini (Argentina) Andrés Molteni; 6–3, 7–5	(United States) James Cerretani (Romania) Costin Pavăl	(Italy) Marco Cecchinato (Italy) Filippo Volandri	(Dominican Republic) José Hernández (Spain) Rubén Ramírez Hidalgo (Chinese Taipei) Yang Tsung-hua (Spain) Roberto Carballés Baena
June 15	Internationaux de Tennis de Blois; Blois, France; Clay – €35,000+H – 32S/19Q/16D; Singles – Doubles	(France) Mathias Bourgue; 2–6, 6–4, 6–2	(Spain) Daniel Muñoz de la Nava	(France) Calvin Hemery (Colombia) Alejandro González	(Argentina) Máximo González (Argentina) Horacio Zeballos (Argentina) Renzo Olivo (Sweden) Christian Lindell
June 15	Internationaux de Tennis de Blois; Blois, France; Clay – €35,000+H – 32S/19Q/16D; Singles – Doubles	(France) Rémi Boutillier (France) Maxime Teixeira; 6–3, 4–6, [10–8]	(Brazil) Guilherme Clezar (Argentina) Nicolás Kicker	(France) Calvin Hemery (Colombia) Alejandro González	(Argentina) Máximo González (Argentina) Horacio Zeballos (Argentina) Renzo Olivo (Sweden) Christian Lindell
June 22	Aspria Tennis Cup; Milan, Italy; Clay – €42,500 – 32S/31Q/16D; Singles – Doubles	(Argentina) Federico Delbonis; 6–1, 7–6^{(8–6)}	(Brazil) Rogério Dutra Silva	(Italy) Marco Cecchinato (France) Calvin Hemery	(France) Benoît Paire (Italy) Flavio Cipolla (Italy) Filippo Volandri (Serbia) Laslo Djere
June 22	Aspria Tennis Cup; Milan, Italy; Clay – €42,500 – 32S/31Q/16D; Singles – Doubles	(Croatia) Nikola Mektić (Croatia) Antonio Šančić; 6–3, 6–4	(Chile) Cristian Garín (Chile) Juan Carlos Sáez	(Italy) Marco Cecchinato (France) Calvin Hemery	(France) Benoît Paire (Italy) Flavio Cipolla (Italy) Filippo Volandri (Serbia) Laslo Djere
June 29	Marburg Open; Marburg, Germany; Clay – €42,500+H – 32S/30Q/16D; Singles – Doubles	(Spain) Íñigo Cervantes; 2–6, 7–6^{(7–3)}, 6–3	(Germany) Nils Langer	(Russia) Karen Khachanov (Germany) Daniel Brands	(Bosnia and Herzegovina) Mirza Bašić (Czech Republic) Jan Šátral (Belgium) Arthur De Greef (Brazil) Rogério Dutra Silva
June 29	Marburg Open; Marburg, Germany; Clay – €42,500+H – 32S/30Q/16D; Singles – Doubles	(Netherlands) Wesley Koolhof (Netherlands) Matwé Middelkoop; 6–1, 7–5	(Germany) Tobias Kamke (Germany) Simon Stadler	(Russia) Karen Khachanov (Germany) Daniel Brands	(Bosnia and Herzegovina) Mirza Bašić (Czech Republic) Jan Šátral (Belgium) Arthur De Greef (Brazil) Rogério Dutra Silva
June 29	ATP Challenger 2001 Team Padova; Padova, Italy; Clay – €42,500+H – 32S/32Q/16D; Singles – Doubles	(Slovakia) Andrej Martin; 0–6, 6–4, 7–6^{(8–6)}	(Spain) Albert Montañés	(France) Calvin Hemery (Italy) Federico Gaio	(Italy) Alessandro Giannessi (Italy) Marco Cecchinato (Chile) Hans Podlipnik (Spain) Rubén Ramírez Hidalgo
June 29	ATP Challenger 2001 Team Padova; Padova, Italy; Clay – €42,500+H – 32S/32Q/16D; Singles – Doubles	(Russia) Mikhail Elgin (Russia) Andrey Rublev; 6–4, 7–6^{(7–4)}	(Italy) Federico Gaio (Italy) Alessandro Giannessi	(France) Calvin Hemery (Italy) Federico Gaio	(Italy) Alessandro Giannessi (Italy) Marco Cecchinato (Chile) Hans Podlipnik (Spain) Rubén Ramírez Hidalgo

=== July ===
Week of	Tournament	Champions	Runners-up	Semifinalists	Quarterfinalists
July 6	Sparkassen Open; Braunschweig, Germany; Clay – €106,500+H – 32S/23Q/16D; Singles – Doubles	(Serbia) Filip Krajinović; 6–2, 6–4	(France) Paul-Henri Mathieu	(Japan) Taro Daniel (Netherlands) Thiemo de Bakker	(Spain) Pablo Carreño Busta (Germany) Daniel Brands (Argentina) Horacio Zeballos (Germany) Nils Langer
July 6	Sparkassen Open; Braunschweig, Germany; Clay – €106,500+H – 32S/23Q/16D; Singles – Doubles	(Belarus) Sergey Betov (Russia) Mikhail Elgin; 3–6, 6–1, [10–5]	(Bosnia and Herzegovina) Damir Džumhur (Croatia) Franko Škugor	(Japan) Taro Daniel (Netherlands) Thiemo de Bakker	(Spain) Pablo Carreño Busta (Germany) Daniel Brands (Argentina) Horacio Zeballos (Germany) Nils Langer
July 6	Distal & ITR Group Tennis Cup; Todi, Italy; Clay – €42,500+H – 32S/32Q/16D; Singles – Doubles	(United Kingdom) Aljaž Bedene; 7–6^{(7–3)}, 6–4	(Argentina) Nicolás Kicker	(Italy) Marco Cecchinato (Italy) Matteo Donati	(Belgium) Germain Gigounon (France) Stéphane Robert (Italy) Andrea Arnaboldi (Colombia) Alejandro González
July 6	Distal & ITR Group Tennis Cup; Todi, Italy; Clay – €42,500+H – 32S/32Q/16D; Singles – Doubles	(Italy) Flavio Cipolla (Argentina) Máximo González; 6–4, 6–1	(Germany) Andreas Beck (Germany) Peter Gojowczyk	(Italy) Marco Cecchinato (Italy) Matteo Donati	(Belgium) Germain Gigounon (France) Stéphane Robert (Italy) Andrea Arnaboldi (Colombia) Alejandro González
July 6	Nielsen Pro Tennis Championship; Winnetka, United States; Hard – $50,000 – 32S/32Q/16D; Singles – Doubles	(India) Somdev Devvarman; 7–5, 4–6, 7–6^{(7–5)}	(United States) Daniel Nguyen	(United States) Ryan Harrison (Switzerland) Adrien Bossel	(United States) Nicolas Meister (Slovenia) Blaž Kavčič (United States) Jared Hiltzik (United States) Mitchell Krueger
July 6	Nielsen Pro Tennis Championship; Winnetka, United States; Hard – $50,000 – 32S/32Q/16D; Singles – Doubles	(Sweden) Johan Brunström (United States) Nicholas Monroe; 4–6, 6–3, [10–8]	(United States) Sekou Bangoura (Canada) Frank Dancevic	(United States) Ryan Harrison (Switzerland) Adrien Bossel	(United States) Nicolas Meister (Slovenia) Blaž Kavčič (United States) Jared Hiltzik (United States) Mitchell Krueger
July 13	Poznań Open; Poznań, Poland; Clay – €64,000+H – 32S/32Q/16D; Singles – Doubles	(Spain) Pablo Carreño Busta; 6–4, 6–4	(Moldova) Radu Albot	(France) Lucas Pouille (Czech Republic) Adam Pavlásek	(Czech Republic) Jan Šátral (Brazil) André Ghem (Serbia) Peđa Krstin (Spain) Pere Riba
July 13	Poznań Open; Poznań, Poland; Clay – €64,000+H – 32S/32Q/16D; Singles – Doubles	(Russia) Mikhail Elgin (Poland) Mateusz Kowalczyk; 3–6, 6–3, [10–6]	(Chile) Julio Peralta (United States) Matt Seeberger	(France) Lucas Pouille (Czech Republic) Adam Pavlásek	(Czech Republic) Jan Šátral (Brazil) André Ghem (Serbia) Peđa Krstin (Spain) Pere Riba
July 13	San Benedetto Tennis Cup; San Benedetto del Tronto, Italy; Clay – €64,000+H – 32S/23Q/16D; Singles – Doubles	(Spain) Albert Ramos Viñolas; 6–2, 6–4	(Italy) Alessandro Giannessi	(Italy) Salvatore Caruso (Italy) Marco Cecchinato	(Italy) Matteo Donati (France) Maxime Hamou (Italy) Filippo Volandri (Italy) Paolo Lorenzi
July 13	San Benedetto Tennis Cup; San Benedetto del Tronto, Italy; Clay – €64,000+H – 32S/23Q/16D; Singles – Doubles	(Croatia) Dino Marcan (Croatia) Antonio Šančić; 6–3, 6–7^{(10–12)}, [12–10]	(Mexico) César Ramírez (Mexico) Miguel Ángel Reyes-Varela	(Italy) Salvatore Caruso (Italy) Marco Cecchinato	(Italy) Matteo Donati (France) Maxime Hamou (Italy) Filippo Volandri (Italy) Paolo Lorenzi
July 20	Challenger Banque Nationale de Granby; Granby, Canada; Hard – $100,000 – 32S/15Q/16D; Singles – Doubles	(France) Vincent Millot; 6–4, 6–4	(Canada) Philip Bester	(Italy) Matteo Donati (Japan) Yoshihito Nishioka	(United States) Eric Quigley (Japan) Yasutaka Uchiyama (Canada) Félix Auger-Aliassime (United States) Jean-Yves Aubone
July 20	Challenger Banque Nationale de Granby; Granby, Canada; Hard – $100,000 – 32S/15Q/16D; Singles – Doubles	(Canada) Philip Bester (Canada) Peter Polansky; 6–7^{(5–7)}, 7–6^{(7–2)}, [10–7]	(France) Enzo Couacaud (Australia) Luke Saville	(Italy) Matteo Donati (Japan) Yoshihito Nishioka	(United States) Eric Quigley (Japan) Yasutaka Uchiyama (Canada) Félix Auger-Aliassime (United States) Jean-Yves Aubone
July 20	Levene Gouldin & Thompson Tennis Challenger; Binghamton, United States; Hard – $50,000 – 32S/19Q/16D; Singles – Doubles	(United Kingdom) Kyle Edmund; 6–2, 6–3	(United States) Bjorn Fratangelo	(United States) Sekou Bangoura (United Kingdom) Brydan Klein	(United States) Mitchell Krueger (United States) Dennis Novikov (Denmark) Frederik Nielsen (United States) Nicolas Meister
July 20	Levene Gouldin & Thompson Tennis Challenger; Binghamton, United States; Hard – $50,000 – 32S/19Q/16D; Singles – Doubles	(South Africa) Dean O'Brien (South Africa) Ruan Roelofse; 6–1, 7–6^{(7–0)}	(United States) Daniel Nguyen (United States) Dennis Novikov	(United States) Sekou Bangoura (United Kingdom) Brydan Klein	(United States) Mitchell Krueger (United States) Dennis Novikov (Denmark) Frederik Nielsen (United States) Nicolas Meister
July 20	Guzzini Challenger; Recanati, Italy; Hard – €42,500+H – 32S/26Q/16D; Singles – Doubles	(Bosnia and Herzegovina) Mirza Bašić; 6–4, 3–6, 7–6^{(7–4)}	(Lithuania) Ričardas Berankis	(Hungary) Márton Fucsovics (Poland) Michał Przysiężny	(Italy) Salvatore Caruso (Belgium) Yannick Mertens (United Kingdom) Joshua Milton (Belgium) Ruben Bemelmans
July 20	Guzzini Challenger; Recanati, Italy; Hard – €42,500+H – 32S/26Q/16D; Singles – Doubles	(India) Divij Sharan (United Kingdom) Ken Skupski; 4–6, 7–6^{(7–3)}, [10–6]	(Serbia) Ilija Bozoljac (Italy) Flavio Cipolla	(Hungary) Márton Fucsovics (Poland) Michał Przysiężny	(Italy) Salvatore Caruso (Belgium) Yannick Mertens (United Kingdom) Joshua Milton (Belgium) Ruben Bemelmans
July 20	Sport 1 Open; Scheveningen, Netherlands; Clay – €42,500+H – 32S/23Q/16D; Singles – Doubles	(Georgia (country)) Nikoloz Basilashvili; 6–7^{(3–7)}, 7–6^{(7–4)}, 6–3	(Russia) Andrey Kuznetsov	(Netherlands) Robin Haase (Netherlands) Thiemo de Bakker	(Romania) Adrian Ungur (Czech Republic) Adam Pavlásek (Slovakia) Andrej Martin (Spain) Daniel Muñoz de la Nava
July 20	Sport 1 Open; Scheveningen, Netherlands; Clay – €42,500+H – 32S/23Q/16D; Singles – Doubles	(Uruguay) Ariel Behar (Brazil) Eduardo Dischinger; 0–0 retired.	(Russia) Aslan Karatsev (Russia) Andrey Kuznetsov	(Netherlands) Robin Haase (Netherlands) Thiemo de Bakker	(Romania) Adrian Ungur (Czech Republic) Adam Pavlásek (Slovakia) Andrej Martin (Spain) Daniel Muñoz de la Nava
July 20	Aamulehti Tampere Open; Tampere, Finland; Clay – €42,500+H – 32S/12Q/16D; Singles – Doubles	(France) Tristan Lamasine; 6–3, 6–2	(Brazil) André Ghem	(Finland) Jarkko Nieminen (Estonia) Vladimir Ivanov	(Estonia) Jürgen Zopp (Czech Republic) Jan Šátral (France) Maxime Hamou (Germany) Andreas Beck
July 20	Aamulehti Tampere Open; Tampere, Finland; Clay – €42,500+H – 32S/12Q/16D; Singles – Doubles	(Brazil) André Ghem (France) Tristan Lamasine; 7–6^{(7–5)}, 7–6^{(7–4)}	(Finland) Harri Heliövaara (Finland) Patrik Niklas-Salminen	(Finland) Jarkko Nieminen (Estonia) Vladimir Ivanov	(Estonia) Jürgen Zopp (Czech Republic) Jan Šátral (France) Maxime Hamou (Germany) Andreas Beck
July 27	President's Cup; Astana, Kazakhstan; Hard – $75,000 – 32S/19Q/16D; Singles – Doubles	(Kazakhstan) Mikhail Kukushkin; 6–4, 6–2	(Russia) Evgeny Donskoy	(Kazakhstan) Dmitry Popko (Russia) Konstantin Kravchuk	(Ukraine) Denys Molchanov (Chinese Taipei) Ti Chen (Belarus) Maxim Dubarenco (Belgium) Yannick Mertens
July 27	President's Cup; Astana, Kazakhstan; Hard – $75,000 – 32S/19Q/16D; Singles – Doubles	(Russia) Konstantin Kravchuk (Ukraine) Denys Molchanov; 6–2, 6–2	(South Korea) Chung Yun-seong (Uzbekistan) Jurabek Karimov	(Kazakhstan) Dmitry Popko (Russia) Konstantin Kravchuk	(Ukraine) Denys Molchanov (Chinese Taipei) Ti Chen (Belarus) Maxim Dubarenco (Belgium) Yannick Mertens
July 27	Challenger Pulcra Lachiter Biella; Biella, Italy; Clay – €42,500 – 32S/25Q/16D; Singles – Doubles	(Slovakia) Andrej Martin; 6–2, 6–2	(Argentina) Nicolás Kicker	(Italy) Gianluca Naso (Italy) Salvatore Caruso	(Morocco) Lamine Ouahab (Chile) Hans Podlipnik (Bosnia and Herzegovina) Tomislav Brkić (Italy) Thomas Fabbiano
July 27	Challenger Pulcra Lachiter Biella; Biella, Italy; Clay – €42,500 – 32S/25Q/16D; Singles – Doubles	(Slovakia) Andrej Martin (Chile) Hans Podlipnik; 7–5, 1–6, [10–8]	(Romania) Alexandru-Daniel Carpen (Croatia) Dino Marcan	(Italy) Gianluca Naso (Italy) Salvatore Caruso	(Morocco) Lamine Ouahab (Chile) Hans Podlipnik (Bosnia and Herzegovina) Tomislav Brkić (Italy) Thomas Fabbiano
July 27	Kentucky Bank Tennis Championships; Lexington, United States; Hard – $50,000 – 32S/26Q/16D; Singles – Doubles	(Australia) John Millman; 6–3, 3–6, 6–4	(Japan) Yasutaka Uchiyama	(United States) Bjorn Fratangelo (United States) Mitchell Krueger	(Japan) Yoshihito Nishioka (India) Yuki Bhambri (Australia) Omar Jasika (Brazil) Guilherme Clezar
July 27	Kentucky Bank Tennis Championships; Lexington, United States; Hard – $50,000 – 32S/26Q/16D; Singles – Doubles	(Australia) Carsten Ball (United Kingdom) Brydan Klein; 6–4, 7–6^{(7–4)}	(South Africa) Dean O'Brien (South Africa) Ruan Roelofse	(United States) Bjorn Fratangelo (United States) Mitchell Krueger	(Japan) Yoshihito Nishioka (India) Yuki Bhambri (Australia) Omar Jasika (Brazil) Guilherme Clezar

=== August ===
Week of	Tournament	Champions	Runners-up	Semifinalists	Quarterfinalists
August 3	Svijany Open; Liberec, Czech Republic; Clay – €42,500+H – 32S/24Q/16D; Singles – Doubles	(Germany) Tobias Kamke; 7–6^{(8–6)}, 6–4	(Slovakia) Andrej Martin	(Moldova) Radu Albot (Argentina) Horacio Zeballos	(Chile) Hans Podlipnik (Czech Republic) Adam Pavlásek (Argentina) Renzo Olivo (Spain) Íñigo Cervantes
August 3	Svijany Open; Liberec, Czech Republic; Clay – €42,500+H – 32S/24Q/16D; Singles – Doubles	(Slovakia) Andrej Martin (Chile) Hans Podlipnik; 7–5, 6–7^{(3–7)}, [10–5]	(Netherlands) Wesley Koolhof (Netherlands) Matwé Middelkoop	(Moldova) Radu Albot (Argentina) Horacio Zeballos	(Chile) Hans Podlipnik (Czech Republic) Adam Pavlásek (Argentina) Renzo Olivo (Spain) Íñigo Cervantes
August 3	Open Castilla y León; Segovia, Spain; Hard – €42,500+H – 32S/18Q/16D; Singles – Doubles	(Russia) Evgeny Donskoy; 7–6^{(7–2)}, 6–3	(Switzerland) Marco Chiudinelli	(Spain) Marcel Granollers (United States) Connor Smith	(Belgium) Yannick Mertens (Russia) Konstantin Kravchuk (Belarus) Egor Gerasimov (Bosnia and Herzegovina) Mirza Bašić
August 3	Open Castilla y León; Segovia, Spain; Hard – €42,500+H – 32S/18Q/16D; Singles – Doubles	(Russia) Alexander Kudryavtsev (Ukraine) Denys Molchanov; 6–2, 6–4	(Belarus) Aliaksandr Bury (Sweden) Andreas Siljeström	(Spain) Marcel Granollers (United States) Connor Smith	(Belgium) Yannick Mertens (Russia) Konstantin Kravchuk (Belarus) Egor Gerasimov (Bosnia and Herzegovina) Mirza Bašić
August 3	International Tennis Tournament of Cortina; Cortina d'Ampezzo, Italy; Clay – €42,500 – 32S/24Q/16D; Singles – Doubles	(Italy) Paolo Lorenzi; 6–3, 7–5	(Argentina) Máximo González	(Spain) Daniel Muñoz de la Nava (Italy) Andrea Arnaboldi	(Germany) Daniel Brands (Italy) Alessandro Giannessi (Russia) Andrey Kuznetsov (Serbia) Filip Krajinović
August 3	International Tennis Tournament of Cortina; Cortina d'Ampezzo, Italy; Clay – €42,500 – 32S/24Q/16D; Singles – Doubles	(Italy) Paolo Lorenzi (Italy) Matteo Viola; 6–7^{(5–7)}, 6–4, [10–3]	(Chinese Taipei) Lee Hsin-han (Italy) Alessandro Motti	(Spain) Daniel Muñoz de la Nava (Italy) Andrea Arnaboldi	(Germany) Daniel Brands (Italy) Alessandro Giannessi (Russia) Andrey Kuznetsov (Serbia) Filip Krajinović
August 10	Comerica Bank Challenger; Aptos, United States; Hard – $100,000 – 32S/32Q/16D; Singles – Doubles	(Australia) John Millman; 7–5, 2–6, 6–3	(United States) Austin Krajicek	(United Kingdom) Kyle Edmund (United States) Bjorn Fratangelo	(Japan) Taro Daniel (Japan) Yoshihito Nishioka (Australia) Matthew Ebden (Tunisia) Malek Jaziri
August 10	Comerica Bank Challenger; Aptos, United States; Hard – $100,000 – 32S/32Q/16D; Singles – Doubles	(Australia) Chris Guccione (New Zealand) Artem Sitak; 6–4, 7–6^{(7–2)}	(India) Yuki Bhambri (Australia) Matthew Ebden	(United Kingdom) Kyle Edmund (United States) Bjorn Fratangelo	(Japan) Taro Daniel (Japan) Yoshihito Nishioka (Australia) Matthew Ebden (Tunisia) Malek Jaziri
August 10	Advantage Cars Prague Open by Zenova Services; Prague, Czech Republic; Clay – €42,500+H – 32S/32Q/16D; Singles – Doubles	(Brazil) Rogério Dutra Silva; 6–2, 6–7^{(5–7)}, 6–4	(Moldova) Radu Albot	(Czech Republic) Adam Pavlásek (France) Axel Michon	(Serbia) Filip Krajinović (Belgium) Steve Darcis (Italy) Simone Bolelli (Croatia) Nikola Mektić
August 10	Advantage Cars Prague Open by Zenova Services; Prague, Czech Republic; Clay – €42,500+H – 32S/32Q/16D; Singles – Doubles	(Netherlands) Wesley Koolhof (Netherlands) Matwé Middelkoop; 6–4, 3–6, [10–7]	(Belarus) Sergey Betov (Russia) Mikhail Elgin	(Czech Republic) Adam Pavlásek (France) Axel Michon	(Serbia) Filip Krajinović (Belgium) Steve Darcis (Italy) Simone Bolelli (Croatia) Nikola Mektić
August 10	Tilia Slovenia Open; Portorož, Slovenia; Hard – €42,500 – 32S/24Q/16D; Singles – Doubles	(Italy) Luca Vanni; 6–3, 7–6^{(8–6)}	(Slovenia) Grega Žemlja	(Slovakia) Norbert Gombos (Russia) Alexander Kudryavtsev	(Russia) Evgeny Donskoy (Slovenia) Aljaž Radinski (Bosnia and Herzegovina) Mirza Bašić (Italy) Paolo Lorenzi
August 10	Tilia Slovenia Open; Portorož, Slovenia; Hard – €42,500 – 32S/24Q/16D; Singles – Doubles	(France) Fabrice Martin (India) Purav Raja; 7–6^{(7–5)}, 4–6, [18–16]	(Belarus) Aliaksandr Bury (Sweden) Andreas Siljeström	(Slovakia) Norbert Gombos (Russia) Alexander Kudryavtsev	(Russia) Evgeny Donskoy (Slovenia) Aljaž Radinski (Bosnia and Herzegovina) Mirza Bašić (Italy) Paolo Lorenzi
August 17	Odlum Brown Vancouver Open; Vancouver, Canada; Hard – $100,000 – 32S/32Q/16D; Singles – Doubles	(Israel) Dudi Sela; 6–4, 7–5	(Australia) John-Patrick Smith	(India) Yuki Bhambri (United Kingdom) Daniel Evans	(Estonia) Jürgen Zopp (Uzbekistan) Farrukh Dustov (United Kingdom) Brydan Klein (Russia) Karen Khachanov
August 17	Odlum Brown Vancouver Open; Vancouver, Canada; Hard – $100,000 – 32S/32Q/16D; Singles – Doubles	(Philippines) Treat Conrad Huey (Denmark) Frederik Nielsen; 7–6^{(7–4)}, 6–7^{(3–7)}, [10–5]	(India) Yuki Bhambri (New Zealand) Michael Venus	(India) Yuki Bhambri (United Kingdom) Daniel Evans	(Estonia) Jürgen Zopp (Uzbekistan) Farrukh Dustov (United Kingdom) Brydan Klein (Russia) Karen Khachanov
August 17	Internazionali di Tennis del Friuli Venezia Giulia; Cordenons, Italy; Clay – €42,500+H – 32S/32Q/16D; Singles – Doubles	(Serbia) Filip Krajinović; 5–7, 6–4, 4–1 retired	(Romania) Adrian Ungur	(Spain) Roberto Carballés Baena (Italy) Paolo Lorenzi	(Spain) Albert Ramos (France) Kenny de Schepper (Croatia) Antonio Veić (Italy) Filippo Volandri
August 17	Internazionali di Tennis del Friuli Venezia Giulia; Cordenons, Italy; Clay – €42,500+H – 32S/32Q/16D; Singles – Doubles	(Slovakia) Andrej Martin (Slovakia) Igor Zelenay; 6–4, 5–7, [10–8]	(Croatia) Dino Marcan (Croatia) Antonio Šančić	(Spain) Roberto Carballés Baena (Italy) Paolo Lorenzi	(Spain) Albert Ramos (France) Kenny de Schepper (Croatia) Antonio Veić (Italy) Filippo Volandri
August 17	Maserati Challenger; Meerbusch, Germany; Clay – €42,500 – 32S/32Q/16D; Singles – Doubles	(Austria) Andreas Haider-Maurer; 6–2, 6–4	(Argentina) Carlos Berlocq	(Argentina) Facundo Argüello (Spain) Pere Riba	(Belgium) Yannik Reuter (Romania) Victor Hănescu (Germany) Daniel Brands (Czech Republic) Marek Michalička
August 17	Maserati Challenger; Meerbusch, Germany; Clay – €42,500 – 32S/32Q/16D; Singles – Doubles	(Germany) Dustin Brown (Australia) Rameez Junaid; 6–4, 7–5	(Netherlands) Wesley Koolhof (Netherlands) Matwé Middelkoop	(Argentina) Facundo Argüello (Spain) Pere Riba	(Belgium) Yannik Reuter (Romania) Victor Hănescu (Germany) Daniel Brands (Czech Republic) Marek Michalička
August 24	Antonio Savoldi–Marco Cò – Trofeo Dimmidisì; Manerbio, Italy; Clay – €42,500+H – 32S/32Q/16D; Singles – Doubles	(Russia) Andrey Kuznetsov; 6–4, 3–6, 6–1	(Spain) Daniel Muñoz de la Nava	(Italy) Filippo Volandri (Italy) Lorenzo Giustino	(Italy) Federico Gaio (Italy) Salvatore Caruso (France) Kenny de Schepper (Chile) Juan Carlos Sáez
August 24	Antonio Savoldi–Marco Cò – Trofeo Dimmidisì; Manerbio, Italy; Clay – €42,500+H – 32S/32Q/16D; Singles – Doubles	(Italy) Flavio Cipolla (Spain) Daniel Muñoz de la Nava; 7–6^{(7–5)}, 3–6, [11–9]	(Germany) Gero Kretschmer (Germany) Alexander Satschko	(Italy) Filippo Volandri (Italy) Lorenzo Giustino	(Italy) Federico Gaio (Italy) Salvatore Caruso (France) Kenny de Schepper (Chile) Juan Carlos Sáez
August 31	Chang-Sat Bangkok Open; Bangkok, Thailand; Hard – $50,000 – 32S/32Q/16D; Singles – Doubles	(Japan) Yūichi Sugita; 6–4, 6–2	(Argentina) Marco Trungelliti	(Australia) Jordan Thompson (Chinese Taipei) Chen Ti	(Australia) Benjamin Mitchell (United States) Alexander Sarkissian (China) Zhang Ze (India) Somdev Devvarman
August 31	Chang-Sat Bangkok Open; Bangkok, Thailand; Hard – $50,000 – 32S/32Q/16D; Singles – Doubles	(China) Bai Yan (Italy) Riccardo Ghedin; 6–2, 7–5	(Chinese Taipei) Chen Ti (China) Li Zhe	(Australia) Jordan Thompson (Chinese Taipei) Chen Ti	(Australia) Benjamin Mitchell (United States) Alexander Sarkissian (China) Zhang Ze (India) Somdev Devvarman
August 31	Città di Como Challenger; Como, Italy; Clay – €42,500 – 32S/32Q/16D; Singles – Doubles	(Russia) Andrey Kuznetsov; 6–4, 6–3	(Germany) Daniel Brands	(Argentina) Carlos Berlocq (Argentina) Pedro Cachin	(Spain) Roberto Carballés Baena (Italy) Andrea Arnaboldi (Slovakia) Andrej Martin (Spain) Carlos Gómez-Herrera
August 31	Città di Como Challenger; Como, Italy; Clay – €42,500 – 32S/32Q/16D; Singles – Doubles	(Germany) Gero Kretschmer (Germany) Alexander Satschko; 7–6^{(7–3)}, 6–4	(France) Kenny de Schepper (France) Maxime Teixeira	(Argentina) Carlos Berlocq (Argentina) Pedro Cachin	(Spain) Roberto Carballés Baena (Italy) Andrea Arnaboldi (Slovakia) Andrej Martin (Spain) Carlos Gómez-Herrera

=== September ===
Week of	Tournament	Champions	Runners-up	Semifinalists	Quarterfinalists
September 7	AON Open Challenger; Genoa, Italy; Clay – €106,500+H – 32S/32Q/16D; Singles – Doubles	(Spain) Nicolás Almagro; 6–7^{(1–7)}, 6–1, 6–4	(Italy) Marco Cecchinato	(Spain) Albert Ramos (Netherlands) Robin Haase	(Italy) Salvatore Caruso (Italy) Filippo Volandri (Bosnia and Herzegovina) Tomislav Brkić (Kazakhstan) Andrey Golubev
September 7	AON Open Challenger; Genoa, Italy; Clay – €106,500+H – 32S/32Q/16D; Singles – Doubles	(Argentina) Guillermo Durán (Argentina) Horacio Zeballos; 7–5, 6–4	(Italy) Andrea Arnaboldi (Italy) Alessandro Giannessi	(Spain) Albert Ramos (Netherlands) Robin Haase	(Italy) Salvatore Caruso (Italy) Filippo Volandri (Bosnia and Herzegovina) Tomislav Brkić (Kazakhstan) Andrey Golubev
September 7	Seguros Bolívar Open Barranquilla; Barranquilla, Colombia; Clay – $50,000+H – 32S/32Q/16D; Singles – Doubles	(Croatia) Borna Ćorić; 6–4, 6–1	(Brazil) Rogério Dutra Silva	(Argentina) Juan Ignacio Londero (Ecuador) Giovanni Lapentti	(Argentina) Máximo González (Japan) Taro Daniel (Sweden) Christian Lindell (Spain) Marcel Granollers
September 7	Seguros Bolívar Open Barranquilla; Barranquilla, Colombia; Clay – $50,000+H – 32S/32Q/16D; Singles – Doubles	(El Salvador) Marcelo Arévalo (Peru) Sergio Galdós; 6–1, 6–4	(Peru) Duilio Beretta (Peru) Mauricio Echazú	(Argentina) Juan Ignacio Londero (Ecuador) Giovanni Lapentti	(Argentina) Máximo González (Japan) Taro Daniel (Sweden) Christian Lindell (Spain) Marcel Granollers
September 7	Copa Sevilla; Sevilla, Spain; Clay – €42,500+H – 32S/32Q/16D; Singles – Doubles	(Argentina) Pedro Cachin; 7–5, 6–3	(Spain) Pablo Carreño Busta	(Spain) Íñigo Cervantes (Spain) Jordi Samper Montaña	(Spain) Pere Riba (Argentina) Renzo Olivo (Poland) Kamil Majchrzak (Serbia) Miljan Zekić
September 7	Copa Sevilla; Sevilla, Spain; Clay – €42,500+H – 32S/32Q/16D; Singles – Doubles	(Netherlands) Wesley Koolhof (Netherlands) Matwé Middelkoop; 7–6^{(7–5)}, 6–4	(Italy) Marco Bortolotti (Poland) Kamil Majchrzak	(Spain) Íñigo Cervantes (Spain) Jordi Samper Montaña	(Spain) Pere Riba (Argentina) Renzo Olivo (Poland) Kamil Majchrzak (Serbia) Miljan Zekić
September 7	TEAN International; Alphen aan den Rijn, Netherlands; Clay – €42,500 – 32S/32Q/16D; Singles – Doubles	(Bosnia and Herzegovina) Damir Džumhur; 6–1, 2–6, 6–1	(Netherlands) Igor Sijsling	(Slovenia) Grega Žemlja (France) Tristan Lamasine	(Austria) Dennis Novak (Germany) Tobias Kamke (Romania) Victor Hănescu (France) Constant Lestienne
September 7	TEAN International; Alphen aan den Rijn, Netherlands; Clay – €42,500 – 32S/32Q/16D; Singles – Doubles	(Germany) Tobias Kamke (Germany) Jan-Lennard Struff; 7–6^{(7–1)}, 4–6, [10–7]	(Romania) Victor Hănescu (Romania) Adrian Ungur	(Slovenia) Grega Žemlja (France) Tristan Lamasine	(Austria) Dennis Novak (Germany) Tobias Kamke (Romania) Victor Hănescu (France) Constant Lestienne
September 7	Morocco Tennis Tour – Meknes; Meknes, Morocco; Clay – €42,500 – 32S/32Q/16D; Singles – Doubles	(Spain) Daniel Muñoz de la Nava; 6–4, 6–2	(Spain) Roberto Carballés Baena	(Austria) Gerald Melzer (Argentina) Facundo Argüello	(Belgium) Yannik Reuter (Argentina) Tomás Lipovšek Puches (Portugal) Gastão Elias (Italy) Matteo Viola
September 7	Morocco Tennis Tour – Meknes; Meknes, Morocco; Clay – €42,500 – 32S/32Q/16D; Singles – Doubles	(Germany) Kevin Krawietz (Germany) Maximilian Marterer; 7–5, 6–1	(Italy) Gianluca Naso (Italy) Riccardo Sinicropi	(Austria) Gerald Melzer (Argentina) Facundo Argüello	(Belgium) Yannik Reuter (Argentina) Tomás Lipovšek Puches (Portugal) Gastão Elias (Italy) Matteo Viola
September 7	Shanghai Challenger; Shanghai, China; Hard – $50,000 – 32S/32Q/16D; Singles – Doubles	(India) Yuki Bhambri; 3–6, 6–0, 7–6^{(7–3)}	(China) Wu Di	(Russia) Daniil Medvedev (Argentina) Marco Trungelliti	(Italy) Thomas Fabbiano (Australia) Jordan Thompson (Japan) Yūichi Sugita (Colombia) Nicolás Barrientos
September 7	Shanghai Challenger; Shanghai, China; Hard – $50,000 – 32S/32Q/16D; Singles – Doubles	(China) Wu Di (Chinese Taipei) Yi Chu-huan; 6–3, 7–5	(Italy) Thomas Fabbiano (Italy) Luca Vanni	(Russia) Daniil Medvedev (Argentina) Marco Trungelliti	(Italy) Thomas Fabbiano (Australia) Jordan Thompson (Japan) Yūichi Sugita (Colombia) Nicolás Barrientos
September 7	Trophée des Alpilles; Saint-Rémy-de-Provence, France; Hard – €42,500 – 32S/32Q/16D; Singles – Doubles	(Croatia) Ivan Dodig; 6–3, 6–2	(Germany) Nils Langer	(France) David Guez (Germany) Matthias Bachinger	(France) Sébastien Boltz (Slovakia) Norbert Gombos (France) Quentin Halys (Germany) Tim Pütz
September 7	Trophée des Alpilles; Saint-Rémy-de-Provence, France; Hard – €42,500 – 32S/32Q/16D; Singles – Doubles	(United Kingdom) Ken Skupski (United Kingdom) Neal Skupski; 6–4, 6–1	(Slovakia) Andrej Martin (Slovakia) Igor Zelenay	(France) David Guez (Germany) Matthias Bachinger	(France) Sébastien Boltz (Slovakia) Norbert Gombos (France) Quentin Halys (Germany) Tim Pütz
September 14	Pekao Szczecin Open; Szczecin, Poland; Clay – €106,500+H – 32S/32Q/16D; Singles – Doubles	(Germany) Jan-Lennard Struff; 6–4, 6–3	(Ukraine) Artem Smirnov	(Spain) Nicolás Almagro (Italy) Marco Cecchinato	(Spain) Pablo Carreño (Serbia) Filip Krajinović (Argentina) Renzo Olivo (Spain) Íñigo Cervantes
September 14	Pekao Szczecin Open; Szczecin, Poland; Clay – €106,500+H – 32S/32Q/16D; Singles – Doubles	(France) Tristan Lamasine (France) Fabrice Martin; 6–3, 7–6^{(7–4)}	(Italy) Federico Gaio (Italy) Alessandro Giannessi	(Spain) Nicolás Almagro (Italy) Marco Cecchinato	(Spain) Pablo Carreño (Serbia) Filip Krajinović (Argentina) Renzo Olivo (Spain) Íñigo Cervantes
September 14	Banja Luka Challenger; Banja Luka, Bosnia and Herzegovina; Clay – €64,000+H – 32S/32Q/16D; Singles – Doubles	(Serbia) Dušan Lajović; 7–6^{(7–5)}, 7–6^{(7–5)}	(Romania) Victor Hănescu	(Serbia) Miljan Zekić (Romania) Adrian Ungur	(Italy) Flavio Cipolla (Argentina) Horacio Zeballos (Italy) Riccardo Bellotti (Slovakia) Jozef Kovalík
September 14	Banja Luka Challenger; Banja Luka, Bosnia and Herzegovina; Clay – €64,000+H – 32S/32Q/16D; Singles – Doubles	(Serbia) Ilija Bozoljac (Italy) Flavio Cipolla; 6–2, 7–5	(Czech Republic) Jaroslav Pospíšil (Czech Republic) Jan Šátral	(Serbia) Miljan Zekić (Romania) Adrian Ungur	(Italy) Flavio Cipolla (Argentina) Horacio Zeballos (Italy) Riccardo Bellotti (Slovakia) Jozef Kovalík
September 14	Amex-Istanbul Challenger; Istanbul, Turkey; Hard – $75,000 – 32S/32Q/16D; Singles – Doubles	(Russia) Karen Khachanov; 4–6, 6–4, 6–3	(Ukraine) Sergiy Stakhovsky	(Russia) Andrey Kuznetsov (Belgium) Yannick Mertens	(Romania) Marius Copil (Bosnia and Herzegovina) Mirza Bašić (Sweden) Elias Ymer (Russia) Aslan Karatsev
September 14	Amex-Istanbul Challenger; Istanbul, Turkey; Hard – $75,000 – 32S/32Q/16D; Singles – Doubles	(Russia) Andrey Kuznetsov (Kazakhstan) Aleksandr Nedovyesov; 6–2, 5–7, [10–8]	(Georgia (country)) Aleksandre Metreveli (Russia) Anton Zaitcev	(Russia) Andrey Kuznetsov (Belgium) Yannick Mertens	(Romania) Marius Copil (Bosnia and Herzegovina) Mirza Bašić (Sweden) Elias Ymer (Russia) Aslan Karatsev
September 14	ATP Challenger China International – Nanchang; Nanchang, China; Hard – $50,000+H – 32S/32Q/16D; Singles – Doubles	(Germany) Peter Gojowczyk; 6–2, 6–1	(Israel) Amir Weintraub	(Italy) Thomas Fabbiano (Australia) Jordan Thompson	(United States) Alexander Sarkissian (United States) Nicolas Meister (Estonia) Jürgen Zopp (China) Bai Yan
September 14	ATP Challenger China International – Nanchang; Nanchang, China; Hard – $50,000+H – 32S/32Q/16D; Singles – Doubles	(France) Jonathan Eysseric (Estonia) Jürgen Zopp; 6–4, 6–2	(Chinese Taipei) Lee Hsin-han (Israel) Amir Weintraub	(Italy) Thomas Fabbiano (Australia) Jordan Thompson	(United States) Alexander Sarkissian (United States) Nicolas Meister (Estonia) Jürgen Zopp (China) Bai Yan
September 14	Cary Tennis Championships; Cary, United States; Hard – $50,000 – 32S/32Q/16D; Singles – Doubles	(United States) Dennis Novikov; 6–4, 7–5	(United States) Ryan Harrison	(United Kingdom) Brydan Klein (Slovenia) Blaž Rola	(United States) Bjorn Fratangelo (Canada) Peter Polansky (United States) Kevin King (United States) Austin Krajicek
September 14	Cary Tennis Championships; Cary, United States; Hard – $50,000 – 32S/32Q/16D; Singles – Doubles	(United States) Chase Buchanan (Slovenia) Blaž Rola; 6–4, 6–7^{(5–7)}, [10–4]	(United States) Austin Krajicek (United States) Nicholas Monroe	(United Kingdom) Brydan Klein (Slovenia) Blaž Rola	(United States) Bjorn Fratangelo (Canada) Peter Polansky (United States) Kevin King (United States) Austin Krajicek
September 14	Morocco Tennis Tour – Kenitra; Kenitra, Morocco; Clay – €42,500 – 32S/32Q/16D; Singles – Doubles	(Spain) Roberto Carballés Baena; 6–1, 5–1 retired	(Spain) Oriol Roca Batalla	(Germany) Maximilian Marterer (Spain) Javier Martí	(Spain) Daniel Muñoz de la Nava (Italy) Matteo Viola (Argentina) Facundo Argüello (France) Maxime Chazal
September 14	Morocco Tennis Tour – Kenitra; Kenitra, Morocco; Clay – €42,500 – 32S/32Q/16D; Singles – Doubles	(Spain) Gerard Granollers (Spain) Oriol Roca Batalla; 3–6, 7–6^{(7–4)}, [10–8]	(Germany) Kevin Krawietz (Germany) Maximilian Marterer	(Germany) Maximilian Marterer (Spain) Javier Martí	(Spain) Daniel Muñoz de la Nava (Italy) Matteo Viola (Argentina) Facundo Argüello (France) Maxime Chazal
September 21	OEC Kaohsiung; Kaohsiung, Taiwan; Hard – $125,000+H – 32S/32Q/16D; Singles – Doubles	(South Korea) Chung Hyeon; 7–5, 6–4	(India) Yuki Bhambri	(Czech Republic) Jiří Veselý (Japan) Tatsuma Ito	(Japan) Hiroki Moriya (Chinese Taipei) Jimmy Wang (Chinese Taipei) Yang Tsung-hua (Estonia) Jürgen Zopp
September 21	OEC Kaohsiung; Kaohsiung, Taiwan; Hard – $125,000+H – 32S/32Q/16D; Singles – Doubles	(Chinese Taipei) Hsieh Cheng-peng (Chinese Taipei) Yang Tsung-hua; 6–2, 6–2	(China) Gong Maoxin (Chinese Taipei) Peng Hsien-yin	(Czech Republic) Jiří Veselý (Japan) Tatsuma Ito	(Japan) Hiroki Moriya (Chinese Taipei) Jimmy Wang (Chinese Taipei) Yang Tsung-hua (Estonia) Jürgen Zopp
September 21	Türk Telecom İzmir Cup; İzmir, Turkey; Hard – €64,000 – 32S/32Q/16D; Singles – Doubles	(Slovakia) Lukáš Lacko; 6–3, 7–6^{(7–5)}	(Romania) Marius Copil	(Bosnia and Herzegovina) Mirza Bašić (Tunisia) Malek Jaziri	(Turkey) Marsel İlhan (Uzbekistan) Farrukh Dustov (India) Ramkumar Ramanathan (Georgia (country)) Aleksandre Metreveli
September 21	Türk Telecom İzmir Cup; İzmir, Turkey; Hard – €64,000 – 32S/32Q/16D; Singles – Doubles	(India) Saketh Myneni (India) Divij Sharan; 7–6^{(7–5)}, 4–6, retired	(Tunisia) Malek Jaziri (Ukraine) Denys Molchanov	(Bosnia and Herzegovina) Mirza Bašić (Tunisia) Malek Jaziri	(Turkey) Marsel İlhan (Uzbekistan) Farrukh Dustov (India) Ramkumar Ramanathan (Georgia (country)) Aleksandre Metreveli
September 21	Sibiu Open; Sibiu, Romania; Clay – €42,500+H – 32S/32Q/16D; Singles – Doubles	(Romania) Adrian Ungur; 6–4, 3–6, 7–5	(Spain) Pere Riba	(Romania) Petru-Alexandru Luncanu (Serbia) Miljan Zekić	(Serbia) Dušan Lajović (Bulgaria) Dimitar Kuzmanov (Romania) Victor Crivoi (Italy) Gianluca Mager
September 21	Sibiu Open; Sibiu, Romania; Clay – €42,500+H – 32S/32Q/16D; Singles – Doubles	(Romania) Victor Crivoi (Romania) Petru-Alexandru Luncanu; 6–4, 6–3	(Serbia) Ilija Bozoljac (Serbia) Dušan Lajović	(Romania) Petru-Alexandru Luncanu (Serbia) Miljan Zekić	(Serbia) Dušan Lajović (Bulgaria) Dimitar Kuzmanov (Romania) Victor Crivoi (Italy) Gianluca Mager
September 21	Arimex Challenger Trophy; Trnava, Slovakia; Clay – €42,500+H – 32S/32Q/16D; Singles – Doubles	(Netherlands) Robin Haase; 6–4, 6–1	(Argentina) Horacio Zeballos	(Spain) Albert Montañes (Croatia) Franko Škugor	(Austria) Gerald Melzer (Czech Republic) Adam Pavlásek (Hungary) Márton Fucsovics (France) Stéphane Robert
September 21	Arimex Challenger Trophy; Trnava, Slovakia; Clay – €42,500+H – 32S/32Q/16D; Singles – Doubles	(Netherlands) Wesley Koolhof (Netherlands) Matwé Middelkoop; 6–4, 6–2	(Poland) Kamil Majchrzak (France) Stéphane Robert	(Spain) Albert Montañes (Croatia) Franko Škugor	(Austria) Gerald Melzer (Czech Republic) Adam Pavlásek (Hungary) Márton Fucsovics (France) Stéphane Robert
September 21	Campeonato Internacional de Tênis de Campinas; Campinas, Brazil; Clay – $50,000+H – 32S/32Q/16D; Singles – Doubles	(Argentina) Facundo Argüello; 7–5, 6–3	(Argentina) Diego Schwartzman	(Argentina) Facundo Bagnis (Brazil) André Ghem	(Argentina) Nicolás Kicker (Argentina) Juan Ignacio Londero (Chile) Juan Carlos Sáez (Argentina) Guido Pella
September 21	Campeonato Internacional de Tênis de Campinas; Campinas, Brazil; Clay – $50,000+H – 32S/32Q/16D; Singles – Doubles	(Argentina) Andrés Molteni (Chile) Hans Podlipnik; 3–6, 6–2, [10–0]	(Brazil) Guilherme Clezar (Brazil) Fabrício Neis	(Argentina) Facundo Bagnis (Brazil) André Ghem	(Argentina) Nicolás Kicker (Argentina) Juan Ignacio Londero (Chile) Juan Carlos Sáez (Argentina) Guido Pella
September 21	Columbus Challenger; Columbus, United States; Hard (i) – $50,000 – 32S/32Q/16D; Singles – Doubles	(United States) Dennis Novikov; 6–4, 3–6, 6–3	(United States) Ryan Harrison	(United States) Tim Smyczek (United States) Alex Kuznetsov	(United States) Sekou Bangoura (Switzerland) Henri Laaksonen (United States) Bjorn Fratangelo (United States) Chase Buchanan
September 21	Columbus Challenger; Columbus, United States; Hard (i) – $50,000 – 32S/32Q/16D; Singles – Doubles	(United States) Chase Buchanan (Slovenia) Blaž Rola; 6–4, 4–6, [19–17]	(United States) Mitchell Krueger (United States) Eric Quigley	(United States) Tim Smyczek (United States) Alex Kuznetsov	(United States) Sekou Bangoura (Switzerland) Henri Laaksonen (United States) Bjorn Fratangelo (United States) Chase Buchanan
September 28	Open d'Orléans; Orléans, France; Hard (i) – €106,500+H – 32S/32Q/16D; Singles – Doubles	(Germany) Jan-Lennard Struff; 5–7, 6–4, 6–3	(Poland) Jerzy Janowicz	(France) Kenny de Schepper (Ukraine) Illya Marchenko	(Ukraine) Sergiy Stakhovsky (Switzerland) Marco Chiudinelli (France) Paul-Henri Mathieu (Croatia) Franko Škugor
September 28	Open d'Orléans; Orléans, France; Hard (i) – €106,500+H – 32S/32Q/16D; Singles – Doubles	(France) Tristan Lamasine (France) Fabrice Martin; 6–4, 7–6^{(7–2)}	(United Kingdom) Ken Skupski (United Kingdom) Neal Skupski	(France) Kenny de Schepper (Ukraine) Illya Marchenko	(Ukraine) Sergiy Stakhovsky (Switzerland) Marco Chiudinelli (France) Paul-Henri Mathieu (Croatia) Franko Škugor
September 28	2015 Tiburon Challenger; Tiburon, United States; Hard – $100,000 – 32S/32Q/16D; Singles – Doubles	(United States) Tim Smyczek; 1–6, 6–1, 7–6^{(9–7)}	(United States) Denis Kudla	(United States) Mackenzie McDonald (France) Quentin Halys	(Slovenia) Blaž Rola (United States) Bjorn Fratangelo (Czech Republic) Marek Michalička (United States) Mitchell Krueger
September 28	2015 Tiburon Challenger; Tiburon, United States; Hard – $100,000 – 32S/32Q/16D; Singles – Doubles	(Sweden) Johan Brunström (Denmark) Frederik Nielsen; 7–6^{(7–2)}, 6–1	(Australia) Carsten Ball (Australia) Matt Reid	(United States) Mackenzie McDonald (France) Quentin Halys	(Slovenia) Blaž Rola (United States) Bjorn Fratangelo (Czech Republic) Marek Michalička (United States) Mitchell Krueger
September 28	2015 BFD Energy Challenger; Rome, Italy; Clay – €42,500+H – 32S/32Q/16D; Singles – Doubles	(Argentina) Federico Delbonis; 1–6, 6–3, 6–4	(Serbia) Filip Krajinović	(Serbia) Dušan Lajović (Italy) Marco Cecchinato	(Spain) Albert Montañés (Spain) Pere Riba (Spain) Íñigo Cervantes (Netherlands) Thiemo de Bakker
September 28	2015 BFD Energy Challenger; Rome, Italy; Clay – €42,500+H – 32S/32Q/16D; Singles – Doubles	(Poland) Tomasz Bednarek (Poland) Mateusz Kowalczyk; 6–2, 6–1	(Spain) Íñigo Cervantes (Netherlands) Mark Vervoort	(Serbia) Dušan Lajović (Italy) Marco Cecchinato	(Spain) Albert Montañés (Spain) Pere Riba (Spain) Íñigo Cervantes (Netherlands) Thiemo de Bakker
September 28	2015 Seguros Bolívar Open Pereira; Pereira, Colombia; Clay – $50,000+H – 32S/32Q/16D; Singles – Doubles	(Italy) Paolo Lorenzi; 4–6, 6–2, 6–4	(Colombia) Alejandro González	(El Salvador) Marcelo Arévalo (Brazil) João Souza	(Brazil) Guilherme Clezar (Argentina) Federico Coria (Ecuador) Gonzalo Escobar (Ecuador) Emilio Gómez
September 28	2015 Seguros Bolívar Open Pereira; Pereira, Colombia; Clay – $50,000+H – 32S/32Q/16D; Singles – Doubles	(Argentina) Andrés Molteni (Brazil) Fernando Romboli; 6–4, 7–6^{(14–12)}	(El Salvador) Marcelo Arévalo (Colombia) Juan Sebastián Gómez	(El Salvador) Marcelo Arévalo (Brazil) João Souza	(Brazil) Guilherme Clezar (Argentina) Federico Coria (Ecuador) Gonzalo Escobar (Ecuador) Emilio Gómez
September 28	Ağrı Challenger; Ağrı, Turkey; Hard – €42,500+H – 32S/32Q/16D; Singles – Doubles	(Uzbekistan) Farrukh Dustov; 6–4, 6–4	(India) Saketh Myneni	(Russia) Konstantin Kravchuk (Ukraine) Denys Molchanov	(Belgium) Ruben Bemelmans (Bosnia and Herzegovina) Mirza Bašić (Russia) Evgeny Donskoy (Austria) Dennis Novak
September 28	Ağrı Challenger; Ağrı, Turkey; Hard – €42,500+H – 32S/32Q/16D; Singles – Doubles	(Russia) Konstantin Kravchuk (Ukraine) Denys Molchanov; 6–3, 7–6^{(7–4)}	(Russia) Alexandr Igoshin (Belarus) Yaraslav Shyla	(Russia) Konstantin Kravchuk (Ukraine) Denys Molchanov	(Belgium) Ruben Bemelmans (Bosnia and Herzegovina) Mirza Bašić (Russia) Evgeny Donskoy (Austria) Dennis Novak
September 28	Aberto de Tênis do Rio Grande do Sul; Porto Alegre, Brazil; Clay – $40,000+H – 32S/32Q/16D; Singles –Doubles	(Argentina) Guido Pella; 6–3, 7–6^{(7–5)}	(Argentina) Diego Schwartzman	(Argentina) Carlos Berlocq (Brazil) Rogério Dutra Silva	(Argentina) Máximo González (Argentina) Facundo Bagnis (Argentina) Facundo Argüello (Brazil) André Ghem
September 28	Aberto de Tênis do Rio Grande do Sul; Porto Alegre, Brazil; Clay – $40,000+H – 32S/32Q/16D; Singles –Doubles	(Portugal) Gastão Elias (Portugal) Frederico Ferreira Silva; 6–2, 6–4	(Chile) Cristian Garín (Chile) Juan Carlos Sáez	(Argentina) Carlos Berlocq (Brazil) Rogério Dutra Silva	(Argentina) Máximo González (Argentina) Facundo Bagnis (Argentina) Facundo Argüello (Brazil) André Ghem

=== October ===
Week of	Tournament	Champions	Runners-up	Semifinalists	Quarterfinalists
October 5	Ethias Trophy; Mons, Belgium; Hard (i) – €106,500+H – 32S/32Q/16D; Singles – Doubles	(Ukraine) Illya Marchenko; 6–2, 6–7^{(8–10)}, 6–4	(Germany) Benjamin Becker	(Germany) Jan-Lennard Struff (France) Kenny de Schepper	(Russia) Konstantin Kravchuk (Austria) Dennis Novak (Italy) Andrea Arnaboldi (Russia) Karen Khachanov
October 5	Ethias Trophy; Mons, Belgium; Hard (i) – €106,500+H – 32S/32Q/16D; Singles – Doubles	(Belgium) Ruben Bemelmans (Germany) Philipp Petzschner; 6–3, 6–1	(Australia) Rameez Junaid (Slovakia) Igor Zelenay	(Germany) Jan-Lennard Struff (France) Kenny de Schepper	(Russia) Konstantin Kravchuk (Austria) Dennis Novak (Italy) Andrea Arnaboldi (Russia) Karen Khachanov
October 5	Morocco Tennis Tour – Mohammedia; Mohammedia, Morocco; Clay – €42,500 – 32S/32Q/16D; Singles – Doubles	(Spain) Roberto Carballés Baena; 7–6^{(7–4)}, 6–2	(Poland) Kamil Majchrzak	(Spain) Pablo Carreño (Slovakia) Jozef Kovalík	(Italy) Alessandro Giannessi (Italy) Marco Cecchinato (Spain) Rubén Ramírez Hidalgo (Argentina) Federico Delbonis
October 5	Morocco Tennis Tour – Mohammedia; Mohammedia, Morocco; Clay – €42,500 – 32S/32Q/16D; Singles – Doubles	(Spain) Íñigo Cervantes (Netherlands) Mark Vervoort; 3–6, 7–6^{(7–2)}, [12–10]	(Spain) Roberto Carballés Baena (Spain) Pablo Carreño	(Spain) Pablo Carreño (Slovakia) Jozef Kovalík	(Italy) Alessandro Giannessi (Italy) Marco Cecchinato (Spain) Rubén Ramírez Hidalgo (Argentina) Federico Delbonis
October 5	Seguros Bolívar Open Medellín; Medellín, Colombia; Clay – $50,000+H – 32S/32Q/16D; Singles – Doubles	(Italy) Paolo Lorenzi; 7–6^{(7–3)}, 2–0, retired	(Chile) Gonzalo Lama	(Ecuador) Giovanni Lapentti (Spain) Jordi Samper Montaña	(Brazil) Guilherme Clezar (Colombia) Eduardo Struvay (Argentina) Juan Ignacio Londero (Colombia) Alejandro González
October 5	Seguros Bolívar Open Medellín; Medellín, Colombia; Clay – $50,000+H – 32S/32Q/16D; Singles – Doubles	(Colombia) Nicolás Barrientos (Colombia) Eduardo Struvay; 7–6^{(8–6)}, 6–7^{(4–7)}, [10–4]	(Colombia) Alejandro Gómez (Colombia) Felipe Mantilla	(Ecuador) Giovanni Lapentti (Spain) Jordi Samper Montaña	(Brazil) Guilherme Clezar (Colombia) Eduardo Struvay (Argentina) Juan Ignacio Londero (Colombia) Alejandro González
October 5	Sacramento Challenger; Sacramento, United States; Hard – $100,000 – 32S/32Q/16D; Singles – Doubles	(United States) Taylor Harry Fritz; 6–4, 3–6, 6–4	(United States) Jared Donaldson	(United States) Denis Kudla (Australia) Matt Reid	(Germany) Daniel Brands (United States) Mackenzie McDonald (United States) Marcos Giron (United States) Nicolas Meister
October 5	Sacramento Challenger; Sacramento, United States; Hard – $100,000 – 32S/32Q/16D; Singles – Doubles	(Slovenia) Blaž Kavčič (Slovenia) Grega Žemlja; 6–1, 3–6, [10–3]	(Germany) Daniel Brands (Germany) Dustin Brown	(United States) Denis Kudla (Australia) Matt Reid	(Germany) Daniel Brands (United States) Mackenzie McDonald (United States) Marcos Giron (United States) Nicolas Meister
October 5	IS Open de Tênis; São Paulo, Brazil; Clay – $50,000 – 32S/32Q/16D; Singles – Doubles	(Argentina) Carlos Berlocq; 6–3, 6–1	(Belgium) Kimmer Coppejans	(Argentina) Facundo Bagnis (Brazil) Rogério Dutra Silva	(Argentina) Tomás Lipovšek Puches (Argentina) Agustín Velotti (Sweden) Christian Lindell (Argentina) Renzo Olivo
October 5	IS Open de Tênis; São Paulo, Brazil; Clay – $50,000 – 32S/32Q/16D; Singles – Doubles	(Chile) Hans Podlipnik (Brazil) Caio Zampieri; 7–5, 6–0	(Argentina) Nicolás Kicker (Argentina) Renzo Olivo	(Argentina) Facundo Bagnis (Brazil) Rogério Dutra Silva	(Argentina) Tomás Lipovšek Puches (Argentina) Agustín Velotti (Sweden) Christian Lindell (Argentina) Renzo Olivo
October 12	Tashkent Challenger; Tashkent, Uzbekistan; Hard – $125,000+H – 32S/32Q/16D; Singles – Doubles	(Uzbekistan) Denis Istomin; 6–3, 6–4	(Slovakia) Lukáš Lacko	(India) Yuki Bhambri (Lithuania) Ričardas Berankis	(Russia) Evgeny Donskoy (Czech Republic) Jan Šátral (Uzbekistan) Farrukh Dustov (Israel) Dudi Sela
October 12	Tashkent Challenger; Tashkent, Uzbekistan; Hard – $125,000+H – 32S/32Q/16D; Singles – Doubles	(Belarus) Sergey Betov (Russia) Mikhail Elgin; 6–4, 6–4	(Germany) Andre Begemann (New Zealand) Artem Sitak	(India) Yuki Bhambri (Lithuania) Ričardas Berankis	(Russia) Evgeny Donskoy (Czech Republic) Jan Šátral (Uzbekistan) Farrukh Dustov (Israel) Dudi Sela
October 12	Open de Rennes; Rennes, France; Hard (i) – €85,000+H – 32S/32Q/16D; Singles – Doubles	(Tunisia) Malek Jaziri; 5–7, 7–5, 6–4	(Netherlands) Igor Sijsling	(Ukraine) Illya Marchenko (Croatia) Ivan Dodig	(Russia) Karen Khachanov (Czech Republic) Jan Mertl (Turkey) Marsel İlhan (France) Vincent Millot
October 12	Open de Rennes; Rennes, France; Hard (i) – €85,000+H – 32S/32Q/16D; Singles – Doubles	(Italy) Andrea Arnaboldi (Croatia) Antonio Šančić; 6–4, 2–6, [14–12]	(Netherlands) Wesley Koolhof (Netherlands) Matwé Middelkoop	(Ukraine) Illya Marchenko (Croatia) Ivan Dodig	(Russia) Karen Khachanov (Czech Republic) Jan Mertl (Turkey) Marsel İlhan (France) Vincent Millot
October 12	2015 Morocco Tennis Tour – Casablanca II; Casablanca, Morocco; Clay – €42,500 – 32S/32Q/16D; Singles – Doubles	(Bosnia and Herzegovina) Damir Džumhur; 3–6, 6–3, 6–2	(Spain) Daniel Muñoz de la Nava	(Spain) Albert Montañes (Japan) Taro Daniel	(Serbia) Laslo Djere (Spain) Roberto Carballés Baena (Spain) Íñigo Cervantes (Netherlands) Thiemo de Bakker
October 12	2015 Morocco Tennis Tour – Casablanca II; Casablanca, Morocco; Clay – €42,500 – 32S/32Q/16D; Singles – Doubles	(Lithuania) Laurynas Grigelis (Egypt) Mohamed Safwat; 6–4, 6–3	(Netherlands) Thiemo de Bakker (Netherlands) Stephan Fransen	(Spain) Albert Montañes (Japan) Taro Daniel	(Serbia) Laslo Djere (Spain) Roberto Carballés Baena (Spain) Íñigo Cervantes (Netherlands) Thiemo de Bakker
October 12	2015 Fairfield Challenger; Fairfield, United States; Hard – $50,000 – 32S/32Q/16D; Singles – Doubles	(United States) Taylor Harry Fritz; 6–3, 6–4	(Germany) Dustin Brown	(Slovenia) Blaž Rola (United States) Frances Tiafoe	(Slovenia) Blaž Kavčič (United States) Jared Donaldson (Germany) Daniel Brands (Barbados) Darian King
October 12	2015 Fairfield Challenger; Fairfield, United States; Hard – $50,000 – 32S/32Q/16D; Singles – Doubles	(Sweden) Johan Brunström (Denmark) Frederik Nielsen; 6–3, 5–7, [10–5]	(Australia) Carsten Ball (Germany) Dustin Brown	(Slovenia) Blaž Rola (United States) Frances Tiafoe	(Slovenia) Blaž Kavčič (United States) Jared Donaldson (Germany) Daniel Brands (Barbados) Darian King
October 12	Corrientes Challenger; Corrientes, Argentina; Clay – $50,000 – 32S/32Q/16D; Singles – Doubles	(Argentina) Máximo González; 3–6, 7–5, 6–4	(Argentina) Diego Schwartzman	(Argentina) Facundo Argüello (Argentina) Facundo Bagnis	(Austria) Michael Linzer (Portugal) Gastão Elias (Belgium) Kimmer Coppejans (Argentina) Guido Pella
October 12	Corrientes Challenger; Corrientes, Argentina; Clay – $50,000 – 32S/32Q/16D; Singles – Doubles	(Argentina) Horacio Zeballos (Chile) Julio Peralta; 6–2, 6–3	(Argentina) Guillermo Durán (Argentina) Máximo González	(Argentina) Facundo Argüello (Argentina) Facundo Bagnis	(Austria) Michael Linzer (Portugal) Gastão Elias (Belgium) Kimmer Coppejans (Argentina) Guido Pella
October 12	Vietnam Open; Ho Chi Minh City, Vietnam; Hard – $50,000+H – 32S/32Q/16D; Singles – Doubles	(India) Saketh Myneni; 7–5, 6–3	(Australia) Jordan Thompson	(Italy) Thomas Fabbiano (Italy) Flavio Cipolla	(Spain) Marcel Granollers (France) Tristan Lamasine (United States) Daniel Nguyen (Australia) James Duckworh
October 12	Vietnam Open; Ho Chi Minh City, Vietnam; Hard – $50,000+H – 32S/32Q/16D; Singles – Doubles	(France) Tristan Lamasine (Germany) Nils Langer; 1–6, 6–3, [10–8]	(India) Saketh Myneni (India) Sanam Singh	(Italy) Thomas Fabbiano (Italy) Flavio Cipolla	(Spain) Marcel Granollers (France) Tristan Lamasine (United States) Daniel Nguyen (Australia) James Duckworh
October 19	2015 Brest Challenger; Brest, France; Hard (i) – €106,500+H – 32S/32Q/16D; Singles – Doubles	(Croatia) Ivan Dodig; 7–5, 6–1	(France) Benoît Paire	(Italy) Luca Vanni (France) Édouard Roger-Vasselin	(France) David Guez (Netherlands) Igor Sijsling (Russia) Karen Khachanov (Italy) Andrea Arnaboldi
October 19	2015 Brest Challenger; Brest, France; Hard (i) – €106,500+H – 32S/32Q/16D; Singles – Doubles	(Netherlands) Wesley Koolhof (Netherlands) Matwé Middelkoop; 3–6, 6–4, [10–6]	(United Kingdom) Ken Skupski (United Kingdom) Neal Skupski	(Italy) Luca Vanni (France) Édouard Roger-Vasselin	(France) David Guez (Netherlands) Igor Sijsling (Russia) Karen Khachanov (Italy) Andrea Arnaboldi
October 19	Ningbo Challenger; Ningbo, China; Hard – $125,000 – 32S/32Q/16D; Singles – Doubles	(Chinese Taipei) Lu Yen-hsun; 7–6^{(7–3)}, 6–1	(Estonia) Jürgen Zopp	(Germany) Peter Gojowczyk (Croatia) Franko Škugor	(Italy) Thomas Fabbiano (Australia) Jordan Thompson (Germany) Daniel Masur (Australia) James Duckworth
October 19	Ningbo Challenger; Ningbo, China; Hard – $125,000 – 32S/32Q/16D; Singles – Doubles	(Israel) Dudi Sela (Israel) Amir Weintraub; 6–3, 3–6, [10–6]	(Croatia) Nikola Mektić (Croatia) Franko Škugor	(Germany) Peter Gojowczyk (Croatia) Franko Škugor	(Italy) Thomas Fabbiano (Australia) Jordan Thompson (Germany) Daniel Masur (Australia) James Duckworth
October 19	Las Vegas Challenger; Las Vegas, United States; Hard – $50,000 – 32S/32Q/16D; Singles – Doubles	(Netherlands) Thiemo de Bakker; 3–6, 6–3, 6–1	(Slovenia) Grega Žemlja	(United States) Dennis Novikov (Slovenia) Blaž Kavčič	(United States) Austin Krajicek (Slovenia) Blaž Rola (United States) Michael Mmoh (United States) Jared Donaldson
October 19	Las Vegas Challenger; Las Vegas, United States; Hard – $50,000 – 32S/32Q/16D; Singles – Doubles	(Australia) Carsten Ball (Germany) Dustin Brown; 3–6, 6–3, [10–6]	(South Africa) Dean O'Brien (South Africa) Ruan Roelofse	(United States) Dennis Novikov (Slovenia) Blaž Kavčič	(United States) Austin Krajicek (Slovenia) Blaž Rola (United States) Michael Mmoh (United States) Jared Donaldson
October 19	Bangalore Challenger; Bangalore, India; Hard – $50,000 – 32S/32Q/16D; Singles – Doubles	(United Kingdom) James Ward; 6–2, 7–5	(Spain) Adrián Menéndez Maceiras	(India) Saketh Myneni (United States) Daniel Nguyen	(Belgium) Arthur De Greef (Belgium) Yannick Mertens (Italy) Alessandro Bega (India) Sanam Singh
October 19	Bangalore Challenger; Bangalore, India; Hard – $50,000 – 32S/32Q/16D; Singles – Doubles	(India) Saketh Myneni (India) Sanam Singh; 5–7, 6–4, [10–2]	(United States) John Paul Fruttero (India) Vijay Sundar Prashanth	(India) Saketh Myneni (United States) Daniel Nguyen	(Belgium) Arthur De Greef (Belgium) Yannick Mertens (Italy) Alessandro Bega (India) Sanam Singh
October 19	Santiago Challenger; Santiago, Chile; Clay – $50,000 – 32S/32Q/16D; Singles – Doubles	(Brazil) Rogério Dutra Silva; 7–5, 3–6, 7–5	(Argentina) Horacio Zeballos	(Argentina) Máximo González (Argentina) Carlos Berlocq	(Brazil) André Ghem (Brazil) João Souza (Chile) Hans Podlipnik (Portugal) Gastão Elias
October 19	Santiago Challenger; Santiago, Chile; Clay – $50,000 – 32S/32Q/16D; Singles – Doubles	(Argentina) Guillermo Durán (Argentina) Máximo González; 7–6^{(7–2)}, 7–5	(Slovakia) Andrej Martin (Chile) Hans Podlipnik	(Argentina) Máximo González (Argentina) Carlos Berlocq	(Brazil) André Ghem (Brazil) João Souza (Chile) Hans Podlipnik (Portugal) Gastão Elias
October 26	Monterrey Challenger; Monterrey, Mexico; Hard – $100,000+H – 32S/32Q/16D; Singles – Doubles	(Netherlands) Thiemo de Bakker; 7–6^{(7–1)}, 4–6, 6–3	(Dominican Republic) Víctor Estrella Burgos	(United States) Ernesto Escobedo (Italy) Paolo Lorenzi	(United States) Dennis Novikov (Colombia) Eduardo Struvay (United States) Taylor Harry Fritz (Ecuador) Giovanni Lapentti
October 26	Monterrey Challenger; Monterrey, Mexico; Hard – $100,000+H – 32S/32Q/16D; Singles – Doubles	(Netherlands) Thiemo de Bakker (Netherlands) Mark Vervoort; Walkover	(Italy) Paolo Lorenzi (Brazil) Fernando Romboli	(United States) Ernesto Escobedo (Italy) Paolo Lorenzi	(United States) Dennis Novikov (Colombia) Eduardo Struvay (United States) Taylor Harry Fritz (Ecuador) Giovanni Lapentti
October 26	China International Suzhou; Suzhou, China; Hard – $75,000 – 32S/32Q/16D; Singles – Doubles	(Israel) Dudi Sela; 6–1, 1–0, retired	(Croatia) Matija Pecotić	(China) Bai Yan (Italy) Thomas Fabbiano	(Japan) Hiroki Moriya (South Korea) Lee Duck-hee (Chinese Taipei) Jimmy Wang (Germany) Nils Langer
October 26	China International Suzhou; Suzhou, China; Hard – $75,000 – 32S/32Q/16D; Singles – Doubles	(Chinese Taipei) Lee Hsin-han (Ukraine) Denys Molchanov; 3–6, 7–6^{(7–5)}, [10–4]	(China) Gong Maoxin (Chinese Taipei) Peng Hsien-yin	(China) Bai Yan (Italy) Thomas Fabbiano	(Japan) Hiroki Moriya (South Korea) Lee Duck-hee (Chinese Taipei) Jimmy Wang (Germany) Nils Langer
October 26	Traralgon ATP Challenger; Traralgon, Australia; Hard – $50,000 – 32S/32Q/16D; Singles – Doubles	(Australia) Matthew Ebden; 7–5, 6–3	(Australia) Jordan Thompson	(Australia) Matthew Barton (United Kingdom) Brydan Klein	(China) Li Zhe (New Zealand) Jose Statham (Australia) Benjamin Mitchell (Australia) Alex Bolt
October 26	Traralgon ATP Challenger; Traralgon, Australia; Hard – $50,000 – 32S/32Q/16D; Singles – Doubles	(Australia) Dayne Kelly (Australia) Marinko Matosevic; 7–5, 6–2	(Australia) Omar Jasika (Australia) Bradley Mousley	(Australia) Matthew Barton (United Kingdom) Brydan Klein	(China) Li Zhe (New Zealand) Jose Statham (Australia) Benjamin Mitchell (Australia) Alex Bolt
October 26	Lima Challenger Copa Claro; Lima, Peru; Clay – $50,000+H – 32S/32Q/16D; Singles – Doubles	(Portugal) Gastão Elias; 6–2, 7–6^{(7–4)}	(Slovakia) Andrej Martin	(Dominican Republic) José Hernández (Argentina) Guido Pella	(Ecuador) Emilio Gómez (Colombia) Alejandro González (Brazil) Rogério Dutra Silva (Argentina) Carlos Berlocq
October 26	Lima Challenger Copa Claro; Lima, Peru; Clay – $50,000+H – 32S/32Q/16D; Singles – Doubles	(Slovakia) Andrej Martin (Chile) Hans Podlipnik; 6–3, 6–4	(Brazil) Rogério Dutra Silva (Brazil) João Souza	(Dominican Republic) José Hernández (Argentina) Guido Pella	(Ecuador) Emilio Gómez (Colombia) Alejandro González (Brazil) Rogério Dutra Silva (Argentina) Carlos Berlocq
October 26	KPIT MSLTA Challenger; Pune, India; Hard – $50,000 – 32S/32Q/16D; Singles – Doubles	(India) Yuki Bhambri; 6–2, 7–6^{(7–4)}	(Russia) Evgeny Donskoy	(United Kingdom) James Ward (Russia) Alexander Kudryavtsev	(Chinese Taipei) Chen Ti (Belarus) Ilya Ivashka (Spain) Adrián Menéndez Maceiras (India) Vijay Sundar Prashanth
October 26	KPIT MSLTA Challenger; Pune, India; Hard – $50,000 – 32S/32Q/16D; Singles – Doubles	(Spain) Gerard Granollers (Spain) Adrián Menéndez Maceiras; 1–6, 6–3, [10–6]	(Austria) Maximilian Neuchrist (India) Divij Sharan	(United Kingdom) James Ward (Russia) Alexander Kudryavtsev	(Chinese Taipei) Chen Ti (Belarus) Ilya Ivashka (Spain) Adrián Menéndez Maceiras (India) Vijay Sundar Prashanth

=== November ===
Week of	Tournament	Champions	Runners-up	Semifinalists	Quarterfinalists
November 2	Canberra Tennis International; Canberra, Australia; Hard – $50,000 – 32S/32Q/16D; Singles – Doubles	(Australia) Benjamin Mitchell; 5–7, 6–0, 6–1	(Australia) Luke Saville	(Czech Republic) Robin Staněk (Australia) Matt Reid	(United States) Marcos Giron (Germany) Sebastian Fanselow (China) Zhe Li (Australia) Alex Bolt
November 2	Canberra Tennis International; Canberra, Australia; Hard – $50,000 – 32S/32Q/16D; Singles – Doubles	(Australia) Alex Bolt (Australia) Andrew Whittington; 7–6^{(7–2)}, 6–3	(United Kingdom) Brydan Klein (Australia) Dane Propoggia	(Czech Republic) Robin Staněk (Australia) Matt Reid	(United States) Marcos Giron (Germany) Sebastian Fanselow (China) Zhe Li (Australia) Alex Bolt
November 2	Hua Hin Championships; Hua Hin, Thailand; Hard – $125,000 – 32S/16Q/16D; Singles – Doubles	(Japan) Yūichi Sugita; 6–2, 1–6, 6–3	(France) Stéphane Robert	(Estonia) Jürgen Zopp (Japan) Tatsuma Ito	(Chinese Taipei) Lu Yen-hsun (Japan) Yoshihito Nishioka (Germany) Nils Langer (Japan) Hiroki Moriya
November 2	Hua Hin Championships; Hua Hin, Thailand; Hard – $125,000 – 32S/16Q/16D; Singles – Doubles	(Chinese Taipei) Lee Hsin-han (Chinese Taipei) Lu Yen-hsun; Walkover	(Germany) Andre Begemann (India) Purav Raja	(Estonia) Jürgen Zopp (Japan) Tatsuma Ito	(Chinese Taipei) Lu Yen-hsun (Japan) Yoshihito Nishioka (Germany) Nils Langer (Japan) Hiroki Moriya
November 2	Bauer Watertechnology Cup; Eckental, Germany; Carpet (i) – €35,000+H – 32S/32Q/16D; Singles – Doubles	(Russia) Mikhail Youzhny; 7–5, 6–3	(Germany) Benjamin Becker	(Croatia) Ante Pavić (Belgium) Ruben Bemelmans	(Italy) Luca Vanni (Hungary) Márton Fucsovics (Germany) Dustin Brown (Bosnia and Herzegovina) Aldin Šetkić
November 2	Bauer Watertechnology Cup; Eckental, Germany; Carpet (i) – €35,000+H – 32S/32Q/16D; Singles – Doubles	(Belgium) Ruben Bemelmans (Germany) Philipp Petzschner; 7–5, 6–2	(United Kingdom) Ken Skupski (United Kingdom) Neal Skupski	(Croatia) Ante Pavić (Belgium) Ruben Bemelmans	(Italy) Luca Vanni (Hungary) Márton Fucsovics (Germany) Dustin Brown (Bosnia and Herzegovina) Aldin Šetkić
November 2	Charlottesville Men's Pro Challenger; Charlottesville, United States; Hard (i) – $50,000 – 32S/32Q/16D; Singles – Doubles	(United States) Noah Rubin; 3–6, 7–6^{(9–7)}, 6–3	(United States) Tommy Paul	(Bulgaria) Dimitar Kutrovsky (Switzerland) Henri Laaksonen	(United States) Alex Kuznetsov (United States) Tim Smyczek (United States) Bjorn Fratangelo (United States) Stefan Kozlov
November 2	Charlottesville Men's Pro Challenger; Charlottesville, United States; Hard (i) – $50,000 – 32S/32Q/16D; Singles – Doubles	(United States) Chase Buchanan (United States) Tennys Sandgren; 3–6, 6–4, [10–5]	(Canada) Peter Polansky (Canada) Adil Shamasdin	(Bulgaria) Dimitar Kutrovsky (Switzerland) Henri Laaksonen	(United States) Alex Kuznetsov (United States) Tim Smyczek (United States) Bjorn Fratangelo (United States) Stefan Kozlov
November 2	Open Bogotá; Bogotá, Colombia; Clay – $50,000+H – 32S/16Q/16D; Singles – Doubles	(Colombia) Eduardo Struvay; 6–3, 4–6, 6–4	(Italy) Paolo Lorenzi	(Argentina) Horacio Zeballos (Colombia) Alejandro Falla	(Brazil) João Souza (Colombia) Cristian Rodríguez (Chile) Hans Podlipnik (Colombia) Alejandro González
November 2	Open Bogotá; Bogotá, Colombia; Clay – $50,000+H – 32S/16Q/16D; Singles – Doubles	(Chile) Julio Peralta (Argentina) Horacio Zeballos; 6–3, 6–4	(Colombia) Nicolás Barrientos (Colombia) Eduardo Struvay	(Argentina) Horacio Zeballos (Colombia) Alejandro Falla	(Brazil) João Souza (Colombia) Cristian Rodríguez (Chile) Hans Podlipnik (Colombia) Alejandro González
November 2	Challenger Ciudad de Guayaquil; Guayaquil, Ecuador; Clay – $50,000+H – 32S/32Q/16D; Singles – Doubles	(Portugal) Gastão Elias; 6–0, 6–4	(Argentina) Diego Schwartzman	(Argentina) Marco Trungelliti (Argentina) Guido Pella	(Argentina) Guido Andreozzi (Argentina) Nicolás Kicker (Brazil) Thiago Monteiro (Argentina) Facundo Bagnis
November 2	Challenger Ciudad de Guayaquil; Guayaquil, Ecuador; Clay – $50,000+H – 32S/32Q/16D; Singles – Doubles	(Argentina) Guillermo Durán (Argentina) Andrés Molteni; 6–3, 6–4	(Portugal) Gastão Elias (Brazil) Fabrício Neis	(Argentina) Marco Trungelliti (Argentina) Guido Pella	(Argentina) Guido Andreozzi (Argentina) Nicolás Kicker (Brazil) Thiago Monteiro (Argentina) Facundo Bagnis
November 9	Slovak Open; Bratislava, Slovakia; Hard (i) – €85,000+H – 32S/32Q/16D; Singles – Doubles	(Belarus) Egor Gerasimov; 7–6^{(7–1)}, 7–6^{(7–5)}	(Slovakia) Lukáš Lacko	(Romania) Marius Copil (Ukraine) Illya Marchenko	(Slovakia) Norbert Gombos (France) Édouard Roger-Vasselin (Russia) Alexey Vatutin (Czech Republic) Radek Štěpánek
November 9	Slovak Open; Bratislava, Slovakia; Hard (i) – €85,000+H – 32S/32Q/16D; Singles – Doubles	(Serbia) Ilija Bozoljac (Slovakia) Igor Zelenay; 7–6^{(7–3)}, 4–6, [10–5]	(United Kingdom) Ken Skupski (United Kingdom) Neal Skupski	(Romania) Marius Copil (Ukraine) Illya Marchenko	(Slovakia) Norbert Gombos (France) Édouard Roger-Vasselin (Russia) Alexey Vatutin (Czech Republic) Radek Štěpánek
November 9	Knoxville Challenger; Knoxville, United States; Hard (i) – $50,000 – 32S/32Q/16D; Singles – Doubles	(United Kingdom) Daniel Evans; 5–7, 6–1, 6–3	(United States) Frances Tiafoe	(United States) Dennis Novikov (United States) Jared Donaldson	(Australia) James Duckworth (United States) Tennys Sandgren (United Kingdom) Liam Broady (United States) Bjorn Fratangelo
November 9	Knoxville Challenger; Knoxville, United States; Hard (i) – $50,000 – 32S/32Q/16D; Singles – Doubles	(Sweden) Johan Brunström (Denmark) Frederik Nielsen; 6–1, 6–2	(United States) Sekou Bangoura (United States) Matt Seeberger	(United States) Dennis Novikov (United States) Jared Donaldson	(Australia) James Duckworth (United States) Tennys Sandgren (United Kingdom) Liam Broady (United States) Bjorn Fratangelo
November 9	Hyōgo Noah Challenger; Kobe, Japan; Hard (i) – $50,000+H – 32S/32Q/16D; Singles – Doubles	(Australia) John Millman; 6–1, 6–3	(Japan) Taro Daniel	(Japan) Yoshihito Nishioka (Russia) Konstantin Kravchuk	(China) Bai Yan (Japan) Go Soeda (France) Stéphane Robert (Australia) Matthew Ebden
November 9	Hyōgo Noah Challenger; Kobe, Japan; Hard (i) – $50,000+H – 32S/32Q/16D; Singles – Doubles	(Thailand) Sanchai Ratiwatana (Thailand) Sonchat Ratiwatana; 6–4, 2–6, [11–9]	(Chinese Taipei) Chen Ti (Croatia) Franko Škugor	(Japan) Yoshihito Nishioka (Russia) Konstantin Kravchuk	(China) Bai Yan (Japan) Go Soeda (France) Stéphane Robert (Australia) Matthew Ebden
November 9	Internationaux de Tennis de Vendée; Mouilleron-le-Captif, France; Hard (i) – €64,000+H – 32S/32Q/16D; Singles – Doubles	(France) Benoît Paire; 6–4, 1–6, 7–6^{(9–7)}	(France) Lucas Pouille	(France) Paul-Henri Mathieu (France) Adrian Mannarino	(Spain) Marcel Granollers (Russia) Teymuraz Gabashvili (Ukraine) Sergiy Stakhovsky (Russia) Karen Khachanov
November 9	Internationaux de Tennis de Vendée; Mouilleron-le-Captif, France; Hard (i) – €64,000+H – 32S/32Q/16D; Singles – Doubles	(Netherlands) Sander Arends (Poland) Adam Majchrowicz; 6–3, 5–7, [10–8]	(Belarus) Aliaksandr Bury (Sweden) Andreas Siljeström	(France) Paul-Henri Mathieu (France) Adrian Mannarino	(Spain) Marcel Granollers (Russia) Teymuraz Gabashvili (Ukraine) Sergiy Stakhovsky (Russia) Karen Khachanov
November 9	Sparkassen ATP Challenger; Ortisei, Italy; Hard (i) – €64,000 – 32S/32Q/16D; Singles – Doubles	(Lithuania) Ričardas Berankis; 7–6^{(7–3)}, 6–4	(United States) Rajeev Ram	(Serbia) Laslo Djere (Russia) Evgeny Donskoy	(Bosnia and Herzegovina) Mirza Bašić (Bosnia and Herzegovina) Aldin Šetkić (Italy) Luca Vanni (Hungary) Márton Fucsovics
November 9	Sparkassen ATP Challenger; Ortisei, Italy; Hard (i) – €64,000 – 32S/32Q/16D; Singles – Doubles	(Austria) Maximilian Neuchrist (Austria) Tristan-Samuel Weissborn; 7–6^{(9–7)}, 6–3	(Croatia) Nikola Mektić (Croatia) Antonio Šančić	(Serbia) Laslo Djere (Russia) Evgeny Donskoy	(Bosnia and Herzegovina) Mirza Bašić (Bosnia and Herzegovina) Aldin Šetkić (Italy) Luca Vanni (Hungary) Márton Fucsovics
November 9	Copa Fila; Buenos Aires, Argentina; Clay – $50,000+H – 32S/32Q/16D; Singles – Doubles	(United Kingdom) Kyle Edmund; 6–0, 6–4	(Argentina) Carlos Berlocq	(Argentina) Horacio Zeballos (Chile) Cristian Garín	(Chile) Hans Podlipnik (Brazil) Guilherme Clezar (Argentina) Guido Andreozzi (Argentina) Máximo González
November 9	Copa Fila; Buenos Aires, Argentina; Clay – $50,000+H – 32S/32Q/16D; Singles – Doubles	(Chile) Julio Peralta (Argentina) Horacio Zeballos; 6–2, 7–5	(Argentina) Guido Andreozzi (Argentina) Lucas Arnold Ker	(Argentina) Horacio Zeballos (Chile) Cristian Garín	(Chile) Hans Podlipnik (Brazil) Guilherme Clezar (Argentina) Guido Andreozzi (Argentina) Máximo González
November 16	Keio Challenger; Yokohama, Japan; Hard – $50,000 – 32S/32Q/16D; Singles – Doubles	(Japan) Taro Daniel; 4–6, 6–3, 6–3	(Japan) Go Soeda	(Japan) Tatsuma Ito (Australia) Matthew Ebden	(Russia) Alexander Kudryavtsev (Australia) Jordan Thompson (Japan) Yoshihito Nishioka (Japan) Yūichi Sugita
November 16	Keio Challenger; Yokohama, Japan; Hard – $50,000 – 32S/32Q/16D; Singles – Doubles	(Thailand) Sanchai Ratiwatana (Thailand) Sonchat Ratiwatana; 6–4, 6–4	(Italy) Riccardo Ghedin (Chinese Taipei) Yi Chu-huan	(Japan) Tatsuma Ito (Australia) Matthew Ebden	(Russia) Alexander Kudryavtsev (Australia) Jordan Thompson (Japan) Yoshihito Nishioka (Japan) Yūichi Sugita
November 16	Uruguay Open; Montevideo, Uruguay; Clay – $50,000+H – 32S/32Q/16D; Singles – Doubles	(Argentina) Guido Pella; 7–5, 2–6, 6–4	(Spain) Íñigo Cervantes	(Uruguay) Pablo Cuevas (Argentina) Diego Schwartzman	(Argentina) Carlos Berlocq (Chile) Cristian Garín (Slovakia) Andrej Martin (Argentina) Horacio Zeballos
November 16	Uruguay Open; Montevideo, Uruguay; Clay – $50,000+H – 32S/32Q/16D; Singles – Doubles	(Slovakia) Andrej Martin (Chile) Hans Podlipnik; 6–4, 3–6, [10–6]	(Brazil) Marcelo Demoliner (Portugal) Gastão Elias	(Uruguay) Pablo Cuevas (Argentina) Diego Schwartzman	(Argentina) Carlos Berlocq (Chile) Cristian Garín (Slovakia) Andrej Martin (Argentina) Horacio Zeballos
November 16	JSM Challenger of Champaign–Urbana; Champaign, United States; Hard (i) – $50,000 – 32S/32Q/16D; Singles – Doubles	(Switzerland) Henri Laaksonen; 4–6, 6–2, 6–2	(United States) Taylor Harry Fritz	(United States) Mackenzie McDonald (United States) Clay Thompson	(Tunisia) Malek Jaziri (United States) Mitchell Krueger (United States) Eric Quigley (United States) Austin Krajicek
November 16	JSM Challenger of Champaign–Urbana; Champaign, United States; Hard (i) – $50,000 – 32S/32Q/16D; Singles – Doubles	(Republic of Ireland) David O'Hare (United Kingdom) Joe Salisbury; 6–1, 6–4	(United States) Austin Krajicek (United States) Nicholas Monroe	(United States) Mackenzie McDonald (United States) Clay Thompson	(Tunisia) Malek Jaziri (United States) Mitchell Krueger (United States) Eric Quigley (United States) Austin Krajicek
November 16	Trofeo Città di Brescia; Brescia, Italy; Carpet (i) – €42,500+H – 32S/32Q/16D; Singles – Doubles	(Netherlands) Igor Sijsling; 6–4, 6–4	(Bosnia and Herzegovina) Mirza Bašić	(Italy) Luca Vanni (Germany) Dustin Brown	(Uzbekistan) Farrukh Dustov (Slovakia) Norbert Gombos (Ukraine) Illya Marchenko (Switzerland) Marco Chiudinelli
November 16	Trofeo Città di Brescia; Brescia, Italy; Carpet (i) – €42,500+H – 32S/32Q/16D; Singles – Doubles	(Serbia) Ilija Bozoljac (Slovakia) Igor Zelenay; 6–0, 6–3	(Bosnia and Herzegovina) Mirza Bašić (Croatia) Nikola Mektić	(Italy) Luca Vanni (Germany) Dustin Brown	(Uzbekistan) Farrukh Dustov (Slovakia) Norbert Gombos (Ukraine) Illya Marchenko (Switzerland) Marco Chiudinelli
November 23	ATP Challenger Tour Finals; São Paulo, Brazil; Clay (i) – $220,000+H – 8S; Singles	(Spain) Íñigo Cervantes; 6–2, 3–6, 7–6^{(7–4)}	(Spain) Daniel Muñoz de la Nava	(Brazil) Guilherme Clezar (Argentina) Guido Pella	Round Robin losers (Italy) Paolo Lorenzi (Italy) Marco Cecchinato (Moldova) Radu Albot (Uzbekistan) Farrukh Dustov
November 23	Dunlop World Challenge; Toyota, Japan; Carpet (i) – $40,000+H – 32S/32Q/16D; Singles – Doubles	(Japan) Yoshihito Nishioka; 6–3, 6–4	(Russia) Alexander Kudryavtsev	(Russia) Konstantin Kravchuk (Japan) Yūichi Sugita	(Japan) Sho Katayama (South Africa) Tucker Vorster (Chinese Taipei) Jason Jung (Japan) Tatsuma Ito
November 23	Dunlop World Challenge; Toyota, Japan; Carpet (i) – $40,000+H – 32S/32Q/16D; Singles – Doubles	(United Kingdom) Brydan Klein (Australia) Matt Reid; 6–2, 7–6^{(7–3)}	(Italy) Riccardo Ghedin (Chinese Taipei) Yi Chu-huan	(Russia) Konstantin Kravchuk (Japan) Yūichi Sugita	(Japan) Sho Katayama (South Africa) Tucker Vorster (Chinese Taipei) Jason Jung (Japan) Tatsuma Ito
November 23	Internazionali di Tennis Castel del Monte; Andria, Italy; Hard (i) – €42,500+H – 32S/32Q/16D; Singles – Doubles	(Croatia) Ivan Dodig; 6–2, 6–1	(Germany) Michael Berrer	(Israel) Dudi Sela (Belarus) Egor Gerasimov	(Czech Republic) Jan Šátral (Italy) Luca Vanni (Italy) Roberto Marcora (Ukraine) Illya Marchenko
November 23	Internazionali di Tennis Castel del Monte; Andria, Italy; Hard (i) – €42,500+H – 32S/32Q/16D; Singles – Doubles	(Switzerland) Marco Chiudinelli (Germany) Frank Moser; 7–6^{(7–5)}, 7–5	(Australia) Carsten Ball (Germany) Dustin Brown	(Israel) Dudi Sela (Belarus) Egor Gerasimov	(Czech Republic) Jan Šátral (Italy) Luca Vanni (Italy) Roberto Marcora (Ukraine) Illya Marchenko

== Statistical information ==
These tables present the number of singles (S) and doubles (D) titles won by each player and each nation during the season. The players/nations are sorted by:

1. Total number of titles (a doubles title won by two players representing the same nation counts as only one win for the nation);
2. A singles > doubles hierarchy;
3. Alphabetical order (by family names for players).

=== Titles won by player ===
Total	Player	S	D	S	D
9	Hans Podlipnik (CHI)		● ● ● ● ● ● ● ● ●	0	9
8	Andrej Martin (SVK)	● ●	● ● ● ● ● ●	2	6
8	Guillermo Durán (ARG)		● ● ● ● ● ● ● ●	0	8
8	Mikhail Elgin (RUS)		● ● ● ● ● ● ● ●	0	8
8	Horacio Zeballos (ARG)		● ● ● ● ● ● ● ●	0	8
7	Wesley Koolhof (NED)		● ● ● ● ● ● ●	0	7
7	Matwé Middelkoop (NED)		● ● ● ● ● ● ●	0	7
6	Guido Pella (ARG)	● ● ● ●	● ●	4	2
6	Andrés Molteni (ARG)		● ● ● ● ● ●	0	6
6	Igor Zelenay (SVK)		● ● ● ● ● ●	0	6
5	Iñigo Cervantes (ESP)	● ● ● ●	●	4	1
5	Paolo Lorenzi (ITA)	● ● ● ●	●	4	1
5	Daniel Muñoz de la Nava (ESP)	● ● ●	● ●	3	2
5	Máximo González (ARG)	● ●	● ● ●	2	3
5	Tristan Lamasine (FRA)	●	● ● ● ●	1	4
5	Sergey Betov (BLR)		● ● ● ● ●	0	5
5	Flavio Cipolla (ITA)		● ● ● ● ●	0	5
5	Denys Molchanov (UKR)		● ● ● ● ●	0	5
4	Chung Hyeon (KOR)	● ● ● ●		4	0
4	Dudi Sela (ISR)	● ● ●	●	3	1
4	Thiemo de Bakker (NED)	● ●	● ●	2	2
4	Robin Haase (NED)	● ●	● ●	2	2
4	Andrey Kuznetsov (RUS)	● ●	● ●	2	2
4	Austin Krajicek (USA)	●	● ● ●	1	3
4	Blaž Rola (SVN)	●	● ● ●	1	3
4	Ilija Bozoljac (SRB)		● ● ● ●	0	4
4	Johan Brunström (SWE)		● ● ● ●	0	4
4	Chase Buchanan (USA)		● ● ● ●	0	4
4	Mateusz Kowalczyk (POL)		● ● ● ●	0	4
4	Frederik Nielsen (DEN)		● ● ● ●	0	4
4	Julio Peralta (CHI)		● ● ● ●	0	4
3	Aljaž Bedene (GBR)	● ● ●		3	0
3	Taro Daniel (JPN)	● ● ●		3	0
3	Federico Delbonis (ARG)	● ● ●		3	0
3	Ivan Dodig (CRO)	● ● ●		3	0
3	Damir Džumhur (BIH)	● ● ●		3	0
3	Kyle Edmund (GBR)	● ● ●		3	0
3	Teymuraz Gabashvili (RUS)	● ● ●		3	0
3	John Millman (AUS)	● ● ●		3	0
3	Benoît Paire (FRA)	● ● ●		3	0
3	Facundo Argüello (ARG)	● ●	●	2	1
3	Yuki Bhambri (IND)	● ●	●	2	1
3	Somdev Devvarman (IND)	● ●	●	2	1
3	Matthew Ebden (AUS)	● ●	●	2	1
3	Gastão Elias (POR)	● ●	●	2	1
3	Filip Krajinović (SRB)	● ●	●	2	1
3	Dennis Novikov (USA)	● ●	●	2	1
3	Jan-Lennard Struff (GER)	● ●	●	2	1
3	Facundo Bagnis (ARG)	●	● ●	1	2
3	Ruben Bemelmans (BEL)	●	● ●	1	2
3	Saketh Myneni (IND)	●	● ●	1	2
3	Rajeev Ram (USA)	●	● ●	1	2
3	Carsten Ball (AUS)		● ● ●	0	3
3	Dustin Brown (GER)		● ● ●	0	3
3	Chris Guccione (AUS)		● ● ●	0	3
3	Fabrice Martin (FRA)		● ● ●	0	3
3	Aleksandr Nedovyesov (KAZ)		● ● ●	0	3
3	Philipp Petzschner (GER)		● ● ●	0	3
3	Sanchai Ratiwatana (THA)		● ● ●	0	3
3	Sonchat Ratiwatana (THA)		● ● ●	0	3
3	Antonio Šančić (CRO)		● ● ●	0	3
3	Ken Skupski (GBR)		● ● ●	0	3
2	Nikoloz Basilashvili (GEO)	● ●		2	0
2	Roberto Carballés Baena (ESP)	● ●		2	0
2	Pablo Carreño Busta (ESP)	● ●		2	0
2	Kimmer Coppejans (BEL)	● ●		2	0
2	Farrukh Dustov (UZB)	● ●		2	0
2	Rogério Dutra Silva (BRA)	● ●		2	0
2	Taylor Harry Fritz (USA)	● ●		2	0
2	Norbert Gombos (SVK)	● ●		2	0
2	Sam Groth (AUS)	● ●		2	0
2	Tim Smyczek (USA)	● ●		2	0
2	Yūichi Sugita (JPN)	● ●		2	0
2	Radu Albot (MDA)	●	●	1	1
2	Jared Donaldson (USA)	●	●	1	1
2	Egor Gerasimov (BLR)	●	●	1	1
2	Tobias Kamke (GER)	●	●	1	1
2	Aslan Karatsev (RUS)	●	●	1	1
2	Blaž Kavčič (SVN)	●	●	1	1
2	Benjamin Mitchell (AUS)	●	●	1	1
2	Fernando Romboli (BRA)	●	●	1	1
2	Eduardo Struvay (COL)	●	●	1	1
2	Adrian Ungur (ROU)	●	●	1	1
2	Lu Yen-hsun (TPE)	●	●	1	1
2	Andrea Arnaboldi (ITA)		● ●	0	2
2	Bai Yan (CHN)		● ●	0	2
2	Philip Bester (CAN)		● ●	0	2
2	Hsieh Cheng-peng (TPE)		● ●	0	2
2	Marcelo Demoliner (BRA)		● ●	0	2
2	Gerard Granollers (ESP)		● ●	0	2
2	Laurynas Grigelis (LTU)		● ●	0	2
2	Lee Hsin-han (TPE)		● ●	0	2
2	Brydan Klein (GBR)		● ●	0	2
2	Konstantin Kravchuk (RUS)		● ●	0	2
2	Gero Kretschmer (GER)		● ●	0	2
2	Alexander Kudryavtsev (RUS)		● ●	0	2
2	Roberto Maytín (VEN)		● ●	0	2
2	Adrián Menéndez Maceiras (ESP)		● ●	0	2
2	Mate Pavić (CRO)		● ●	0	2
2	Matt Reid (AUS)		● ●	0	2
2	Andrey Rublev (RUS)		● ●	0	2
2	Tennys Sandgren (USA)		● ●	0	2
2	Alexander Satschko (GER)		● ●	0	2
2	Divij Sharan (IND)		● ●	0	2
2	Neal Skupski (GBR)		● ●	0	2
2	Michael Venus (NZL)		● ●	0	2
2	Mark Vervoort (NED)		● ●	0	2
2	Wu Di (CHN)		● ●	0	2
2	Yi Chu-huan (TPE)		● ●	0	2
1	Nicolás Almagro (ESP)	●		1	0
1	Mirza Bašić (BIH)	●		1	0
1	Ričardas Berankis (LTU)	●		1	0
1	Carlos Berlocq (ARG)	●		1	0
1	Mathias Bourgue (FRA)	●		1	0
1	Pedro Cachin (ARG)	●		1	0
1	Marco Cecchinato (ITA)	●		1	0
1	Borna Ćorić (CRO)	●		1	0
1	Steve Darcis (BEL)	●		1	0
1	Niels Desein (BEL)	●		1	0
1	Evgeny Donskoy (RUS)	●		1	0
1	Víctor Estrella Burgos (DOM)	●		1	0
1	Daniel Evans (GBR)	●		1	0
1	Bjorn Fratangelo (USA)	●		1	0
1	Daniel Gimeno Traver (ESP)	●		1	0
1	Peter Gojowczyk (GER)	●		1	0
1	Andreas Haider-Maurer (AUT)	●		1	0
1	Ryan Harrison (USA)	●		1	0
1	Denis Istomin (UZB)	●		1	0
1	Malek Jaziri (TUN)	●		1	0
1	Karen Khachanov (RUS)	●		1	0
1	Thanasi Kokkinakis (AUS)	●		1	0
1	Denis Kudla (USA)	●		1	0
1	Mikhail Kukushkin (KAZ)	●		1	0
1	Henri Laaksonen (SUI)	●		1	0
1	Lukáš Lacko (SVK)	●		1	0
1	Dušan Lajović (SRB)	●		1	0
1	Illya Marchenko (UKR)	●		1	0
1	Nicolas Mahut (FRA)	●		1	0
1	Vincent Millot (FRA)	●		1	0
1	Yoshihito Nishioka (JPN)	●		1	0
1	Lamine Ouahab (MAR)	●		1	0
1	Adam Pavlásek (CZE)	●		1	0
1	Michał Przysiężny (POL)	●		1	0
1	Albert Ramos Viñolas (ESP)	●		1	0
1	Noah Rubin (USA)	●		1	0
1	Alexander Sarkissian (USA)	●		1	0
1	Igor Sijsling (NED)	●		1	0
1	Franko Škugor (CRO)	●		1	0
1	John-Patrick Smith (AUS)	●		1	0
1	Go Soeda (JPN)	●		1	0
1	Luca Vanni (ITA)	●		1	0
1	Jiří Veselý (CZE)	●		1	0
1	James Ward (GBR)	●		1	0
1	Elias Ymer (SWE)	●		1	0
1	Mikhail Youzhny (RUS)	●		1	0
1	Alexander Zverev (GER)	●		1	0
1	Guido Andreozzi (ARG)		●	0	1
1	Sander Arends (NED)		●	0	1
1	Marcelo Arévalo (ESA)		●	0	1
1	Nicolás Barrientos (COL)		●	0	1
1	Andreas Beck (GER)		●	0	1
1	Tomasz Bednarek (POL)		●	0	1
1	Ariel Behar (URU)		●	0	1
1	Alex Bolt (AUS)		●	0	1
1	Rémi Boutillier (FRA)		●	0	1
1	Grégoire Burquier (FRA)		●	0	1
1	František Čermák (CZE)		●	0	1
1	James Cerretani (USA)		●	0	1
1	Marco Chiudinelli (SUI)		●	0	1
1	Andrea Collarini (ARG)		●	0	1
1	Victor Crivoi (ROU)		●	0	1
1	Marcus Daniell (NZL)		●	0	1
1	Eduardo Dischinger (BRA)		●	0	1
1	Antal van der Duim (NED)		●	0	1
1	Martin Emmrich (GER)		●	0	1
1	Jonathan Eysseric (FRA)		●	0	1
1	Sergio Galdós (PER)		●	0	1
1	Riccardo Ghedin (ITA)		●	0	1
1	André Ghem (BRA)		●	0	1
1	Gong Maoxin (CHN)		●	0	1
1	Ruben Gonzales (PHI)		●	0	1
1	Treat Huey (PHI)		●	0	1
1	Roman Jebavý (CZE)		●	0	1
1	Rameez Junaid (AUS)		●	0	1
1	Dayne Kelly (AUS)		●	0	'1
1	Julian Knowle (AUT)		●	0	1
1	Stefan Kozlov (USA)		●	0	1
1	Kevin Krawietz (GER)		●	0	1
1	Mitchell Krueger (USA)		●	0	1
1	Nils Langer (GER)		●	0	1
1	Li Zhe (CHN)		●	0	1
1	Robert Lindstedt (SWE)		●	0	1
1	Petru-Alexandru Luncanu (ROU)		●	0	1
1	Adam Majchrowicz (POL)		●	0	1
1	Dino Marcan (CRO)		●	0	1
1	Maximilian Marterer (GER)		●	0	1
1	Marinko Matosevic (AUS)		●	0	'1
1	Dominik Meffert (GER)		●	0	1
1	Nikola Mektić (CRO)		●	0	1
1	Jan Mertl (CZE)		●	0	1
1	Nicholas Monroe (USA)		●	0	1
1	Frank Moser (GER)		●	0	1
1	Jeevan Nedunchezhiyan (IND)		●	0	1
1	Maximilian Neuchrist (AUT)		●	0	1
1	Dean O'Brien (RSA)		●	0	1
1	David O'Hare (IRE)		●	0	1
1	Renzo Olivo (ARG)		●	0	1
1	Philipp Oswald (AUT)		●	0	1
1	Peng Hsien-yin (TPE)		●	0	1
1	Peter Polansky (CAN)		●	0	1
1	Tim Pütz (GER)		●	0	1
1	Aisam-ul-Haq Qureshi (PAK)		●	0	1
1	Purav Raja (IND)		●	0	1
1	Miguel Ángel Reyes-Varela (MEX)		●	0	1
1	Oriol Roca Batalla (ESP)		●	0	1
1	Ruan Roelofse (RSA)		●	0	1
1	André Sá (BRA)		●	0	1
1	Jan Šátral (CZE)		●	0	1
1	Mohamed Safwat (EGY)		●	0	1
1	Joe Salisbury (GBR)		●	0	1
1	Sanam Singh (IND)		●	0	1
1	Yaraslav Shyla (BLR)		●	0	1
1	Alexandre Sidorenko (FRA)		●	0	1
1	Andreas Siljeström (SWE)		●	0	1
1	Frederico Ferreira Silva (POR)		●	0	1
1	Artem Sitak (NZL)		●	0	1
1	Sergiy Stakhovsky (UKR)		●	0	1
1	Potito Starace (ITA)		●	0	1
1	Jose Rubin Statham (NZL)		●	0	1
1	Maxime Teixeira (FRA)		●	0	1
1	Jordan Thompson (AUS)		●	0	1
1	Matteo Viola (ITA)		●	0	1
1	Darren Walsh (GBR)		●	0	1
1	Wang Chieh-fu (TPE)		●	0	1
1	Amir Weintraub (ISR)		●	0	1
1	Tristan-Samuel Weissborn (AUT)		●	0	1
1	Andrew Whittington (AUS)		●	0	1
1	Yang Tsung-hua (TPE)		●	0	1
1	Caio Zampieri (BRA)		●	0	1
1	Grega Žemlja (SVN)		●	0	1
1	Jürgen Zopp (EST)		●	0	1

=== Titles won by nation ===
Total	Nation	S	D
46	Argentina (ARG)	13	33
31	United States (USA)	14	17
27	Australia (AUS)	11	16
27	Netherlands (NED)	5	22
26	Russia (RUS)	9	17
25	Germany (GER)	5	20
22	Spain (ESP)	14	8
19	France (FRA)	7	12
17	Italy (ITA)	6	11
17	Slovakia (SVK)	5	12
16	Great Britain (GBR)	7	9
14	India (IND)	5	9
13	Chile (CHI)	0	13
12	Croatia (CRO)	5	7
11	Chinese Taipei (TPE)	1	10
10	Brazil (BRA)	3	7
8	Belarus (BLR)	1	7
8	Serbia (SRB)	3	5
8	Slovenia (SVN)	3	5
7	Belgium (BEL)	5	2
7	Japan (JPN)	7	0
7	Poland (POL)	1	6
7	Sweden (SWE)	1	6
7	Ukraine (UKR)	1	6
6	China (CHN)	0	6
6	Czech Republic (CZE)	2	4
6	Thailand (THA)	0	6
5	Austria (AUT)	1	4
5	Israel (ISR)	3	2
5	New Zealand (NZL)	0	5
4	Bosnia and Herzegovina (BIH)	4	0
4	Denmark (DEN)	0	4
4	Kazakhstan (KAZ)	1	3
4	South Korea (KOR)	4	0
4	Portugal (POR)	2	2
4	Romania (ROU)	1	3
3	Canada (CAN)	0	3
3	Colombia (COL)	1	2
3	Lithuania (LTU)	1	2
3	Uzbekistan (UZB)	3	0
2	Georgia (GEO)	2	0
2	Moldova (MDA)	1	1
2	Philippines (PHI)	0	2
2	South Africa (RSA)	0	2
2	Switzerland (SUI)	1	1
2	Venezuela (VEN)	0	2
1	Dominican Republic (DOM)	1	0
1	Egypt (EGY)	0	1
1	El Salvador (ESA)	0	1
1	Honduras (HON)	0	1
1	Ireland (IRL)	0	1
1	Morocco (MAR)	1	0
1	Mexico (MEX)	0	1
1	Pakistan (PAK)	0	1
1	Peru (PER)	0	1
1	Tunisia (TUN)	1	0
1	Uruguay (URU)	0	1

- Aljaž Bedene started representing Great Britain in March, he won one title whilst representing Slovenia.

== Point distribution ==
Points are awarded as follows:

Category		W	F	SF	QF	R16	R32	Q	Q3	Q2	Q1
Challenger Tour Finals	S	RR+80	RR+30	15 per round robin win				—N/a			
Challenger $125,000+H; Challenger €106,500+H	S	125	75	45	25	10	0	+5	0	0	0
Challenger $125,000+H; Challenger €106,500+H	D	125	75	45	25	0	—N/a				
Challenger $125,000 or $100,000+H; Challenger €106,500 or €85,000+H	S	110	65	40	20	9	0	+5	0	0	0
Challenger $125,000 or $100,000+H; Challenger €106,500 or €85,000+H	D	110	65	40	20	0	—N/a				
Challenger $100,000 or $75,000+H; Challenger €85,000 or €64,000+H	S	100	60	35	18	8	0	+5	0	0	0
Challenger $100,000 or $75,000+H; Challenger €85,000 or €64,000+H	D	100	60	35	18	0	—N/a				
Challenger $75,000 or $50,000+H; Challenger €64,000 or €42,500+H	S	90	55	33	17	8	0	+5	0	0	0
Challenger $75,000 or $50,000+H; Challenger €64,000 or €42,500+H	D	90	55	33	17	0	—N/a				
Challenger $50,000; Challenger €42,500	S	80	48	29	15	7	0	+3	0	0	0
Challenger $50,000; Challenger €42,500	D	80	48	29	15	0	—N/a				
Challenger $40,000+H; Challenger €35,000+H	S	80	48	29	15	6	0	+3	0	0	0
Challenger $40,000+H; Challenger €35,000+H	D	80	48	29	15	0	—N/a				
