= 2018 Irving Tennis Classic – Singles =

Singles
- 2018 Irving Tennis Classic

Final
- Champion: (Kazakhstan) Mikhail Kukushkin
- Runner-up: (Italy) Matteo Berrettini
- Score: 6–2, 3–6, 6–1

Events
Singles	Doubles
← 2017 ·	Irving Tennis Classic

Aljaž Bedene was the defending champion but chose not to defend his title.

Mikhail Kukushkin won the title after defeating Matteo Berrettini 6–2, 3–6, 6–1 in the final.

== Seeds ==
1. (Japan) Yūichi Sugita (first round)
2. (United States) Jared Donaldson (second round)
3. (United States) Steve Johnson (semifinals)
4. (Hungary) Márton Fucsovics (semifinals)
5. (France) Gilles Simon (second round)
6. (Germany) Maximilian Marterer (first round)
7. (Russia) Evgeny Donskoy (withdrew)
8. (Italy) Thomas Fabbiano (first round)

== Draw ==
=== Key ===
- Q = Qualifier
- WC = Wild card
- LL = Lucky loser
- Alt = Alternate
- SE = Special exempt
- PR = Protected ranking
- ITF = ITF entry
- JE = Junior exempt
- w/o = Walkover
- r = Retired
- d = Defaulted
- SR = Special ranking

=== Finals ===
Semifinals
Alt	(Italy) Matteo Berrettini	6	6
4/WC	(Hungary) Márton Fucsovics	3	4
3	(United States) Steve Johnson	4	6^{6}
(Kazakhstan) Mikhail Kukushkin	6	7^{8}

Final
Alt	(Italy) Matteo Berrettini	2	6	1
(Kazakhstan) Mikhail Kukushkin	6	3	6

=== Top half ===
First round
1	(Japan) Y Sugita	6	1	6^{3}
Alt	(Italy) M Berrettini	3	6	7^{7}
Alt	(Serbia) P Krstin	4	3
Alt	(United States) T Smyczek	6	6
LL	(Antigua and Barbuda) J Maginley	2	1
(Bosnia and Herzegovina) M Bašić	6	6
(Lithuania) R Berankis	2	2
5	(France) G Simon	6	6
4/WC	(Hungary) M Fucsovics	6	6
WC	(Germany) P Petzschner	4	2
Alt	(Colombia) DE Galán	2	6	3
Alt	(Sweden) E Ymer	6	3	6
Q	(France) A Rinderknech	3	7	6
Q	(Israel) Or Ram-Harel	6	5	4
Q	(Cyprus) P Chrysochos	2	7	6
8/WC	(Italy) T Fabbiano	6	5	2

Second round
Alt	(Italy) M Berrettini	3	6	6
Alt	(United States) T Smyczek	6	1	4
(Bosnia and Herzegovina) M Bašić	7	3	6
5	(France) G Simon	5	6	3
4/WC	(Hungary) M Fucsovics	6	3	6
Alt	(Sweden) E Ymer	4	6	3
Q	(France) A Rinderknech	3	6	2
Q	(Cyprus) P Chrysochos	6	4	6

Quarterfinals
Alt	(Italy) M Berrettini	6	6^{5}	6
(Bosnia and Herzegovina) M Bašić	4	7^{7}	1
4/WC	(Hungary) M Fucsovics	6	6
Q	(Cyprus) P Chrysochos	3	3

Semifinals
Alt	(Italy) M Berrettini	6	6
4/WC	(Hungary) M Fucsovics	3	4

=== Bottom half ===
First round
6	(Germany) M Marterer	4	3
WC	(Australia) A de Minaur	6	6
(Russia) M Youzhny	3	6	7^{7}
(Australia) M Ebden	6	1	6^{4}
Alt	(Germany) S Fanselow	4	3
(Slovakia) L Lacko	6	6
Alt	(Ukraine) S Stakhovsky	7	6^{7}	4
3	(United States) S Johnson	5	7^{9}	6
LL	(Mexico) T Hank	1	2
Alt	(United States) M Mmoh	6	6
Q	(United States) P Kypson	6^{0}	0
Alt	(United States) B Fratangelo	7^{7}	6
(Kazakhstan) M Kukushkin	6^{3}	6	7
Alt	(United States) A Krajicek	7^{7}	4	5
(Moldova) R Albot	4	6^{4}
2	(United States) J Donaldson	6	7^{7}

Second round
WC	(Australia) A de Minaur	6	2	6
(Russia) M Youzhny	2	6	2
(Slovakia) L Lacko	0	2
3	(United States) S Johnson	6	6
Alt	(United States) M Mmoh	6^{5}	4
Alt	(United States) B Fratangelo	7^{7}	6
(Kazakhstan) M Kukushkin	6	6
2	(United States) J Donaldson	3	3

Quarterfinals
WC	(Australia) A de Minaur	2	2
3	(United States) S Johnson	6	6
Alt	(United States) B Fratangelo	3	3
(Kazakhstan) M Kukushkin	6	6

Semifinals
3	(United States) S Johnson	4	6^{6}
(Kazakhstan) M Kukushkin	6	7^{8}
