= 2014 Irving Tennis Classic – Singles =

Singles
- 2014 Irving Tennis Classic

Final
- Champion: (Czech Republic) Lukáš Rosol
- Runner-up: (United States) Steve Johnson
- Score: 6–0, 6–3

Events
| Singles | Doubles |
| ← 2013 · | Irving Tennis Classic | · 2015 → |

Jürgen Melzer was the defending champion but withdrew due to injury.

Lukáš Rosol won the title, defeating Steve Johnson in the final, 6–0, 6–3.

== Seeds ==
1. (Canada) Vasek Pospisil (first round)
2. (Argentina) Federico Delbonis (second round)
3. (Czech Republic) Lukáš Rosol (champion)
4. (Netherlands) Igor Sijsling (second round)
5. (Uzbekistan) Denis Istomin (second round)
6. (Russia) Teymuraz Gabashvili (second round)
7. (Kazakhstan) Andrey Golubev (first round, retired)
8. (India) Somdev Devvarman (first round)

== Draw ==
=== Key ===
- Q = Qualifier
- WC = Wild card
- LL = Lucky loser
- Alt = Alternate
- SE = Special exempt
- PR = Protected ranking
- ITF = ITF entry
- JE = Junior exempt
- w/o = Walkover
- r = Retired
- d = Defaulted
- SR = Special ranking

=== Finals ===
Semifinals
(United States) Steve Johnson | 6 | 6
(Germany) Tobias Kamke | 4 | 2
3 | (Czech Republic) Lukáš Rosol | 5 | 6 | 6
(Ukraine) Sergiy Stakhovsky | 7 | 1 | 0

Final
(United States) Steve Johnson | 0 | 3
3 | (Czech Republic) Lukáš Rosol | 6 | 6

=== Top half ===
First round
1 | (Canada) V Pospisil | 2 | 6 | 3
(Germany) B Becker | 6 | 4 | 6
(Argentina) G Pella | 1 | 6 | 4
(Italy) P Lorenzi | 6 | 3 | 6
WC | (South Africa) J Anderson | 6^{4} | 3
(United States) S Johnson | 7^{7} | 6
(Spain) D Gimeno Traver | 6 | 6
8 | (India) S Devvarman | 3 | 4
4 | (Netherlands) I Sijsling | 6 | 7
Q | (United States) A Kuznetsov | 3 | 5
Q | (Ukraine) I Marchenko | 1 | 7 | 6
WC | (United States) B Reynolds | 6 | 5 | 4
(Germany) T Kamke | 3
(Czech Republic) J Hájek | 2^{r}
Q | (United States) R Williams | 0 | 2
5 | (Uzbekistan) D Istomin | 6 | 6

Second round
(Germany) B Becker | 6 | 0
(Italy) P Lorenzi | 2 | 0^{r}
(United States) S Johnson | 6 | 6
(Spain) D Gimeno Traver | 3 | 2
4 | (Netherlands) I Sijsling | 5 | 2
Q | (Ukraine) I Marchenko | 7 | 6
(Germany) T Kamke | 6 | 7^{7}
5 | (Uzbekistan) D Istomin | 3 | 6^{5}

Quarterfinals
(Germany) B Becker | 3 | 1
(United States) S Johnson | 6 | 6
Q | (Ukraine) I Marchenko | 3 | 0^{r}
(Germany) T Kamke | 6 | 0

Semifinals
(United States) S Johnson | 6 | 6
(Germany) T Kamke | 4 | 2

=== Bottom half ===
First round
6 | (Russia) T Gabashvili | 3 | 6 | 6
Q | (Chinese Taipei) J Wang | 6 | 1 | 3
(United States) R Harrison | 3 | 6 | 6
(Slovakia) L Lacko | 6 | 3 | 0
(Germany) D Brands | 7^{9} | 6
WC | (Germany) M Zverev | 6^{7} | 2
(United States) M Russell | 3 | 4
3 | (Czech Republic) L Rosol | 6 | 6
7 | (Kazakhstan) A Golubev | 3 | 0^{r}
(United States) T Smyczek | 6 | 3
WC | (United States) R Ram | 1 | 6^{1}
(Belgium) D Goffin | 6 | 7^{7}
(Ukraine) S Stakhovsky | 6 | 5 | 6
(Netherlands) J Huta Galung | 1 | 7 | 1
(Russia) A Bogomolov Jr. | 3 | 4
2 | (Argentina) F Delbonis | 6 | 6

Second round
6 | (Russia) T Gabashvili | 6 | 3 | 4
(United States) R Harrison | 4 | 6 | 6
(Germany) D Brands | 3 | 1
3 | (Czech Republic) L Rosol | 6 | 6
(United States) T Smyczek | 7^{7} | 6
(Belgium) D Goffin | 6^{2} | 4
(Ukraine) S Stakhovsky | 6 | 6
2 | (Argentina) F Delbonis | 3 | 3

Quarterfinals
(United States) R Harrison | 4 | 6 | 3
3 | (Czech Republic) L Rosol | 6 | 3 | 6
(United States) T Smyczek | 3 | 6^{5}
(Ukraine) S Stakhovsky | 6 | 7^{7}

Semifinals
3 | (Czech Republic) L Rosol | 5 | 6 | 6
(Ukraine) S Stakhovsky | 7 | 1 | 0
