= 2014 Irving Tennis Classic – Doubles =

Doubles
- 2014 Irving Tennis Classic

Final
- Champion: (Mexico) Santiago González (United States) Scott Lipsky
- Runner-up: (Australia) John-Patrick Smith (New Zealand) Michael Venus
- Score: 4–6, 7–6^{(9–7)}, [10–7]

Events
Singles	Doubles
← 2013 ·	Irving Tennis Classic	· 2015 →

Jürgen Melzer and Philipp Petzschner were the defending champions, but decided not to compete.

Santiago González and Scott Lipsky won the title, defeating John-Patrick Smith and Michael Venus in the final, 4–6, 7–6^{(9–7)}, [10–7]

== Seeds ==
1. (Mexico) Santiago González / (United States) Scott Lipsky (champions)
2. (United States) Nicholas Monroe / (Germany) Simon Stadler (first round)
3. (Austria) Oliver Marach / (Canada) Vasek Pospisil (first round)
4. (United Kingdom) Ken Skupski / (United Kingdom) Neal Skupski (quarterfinals)

== Draw ==
=== Key ===
- Q = Qualifier
- WC = Wild card
- LL = Lucky loser
- Alt = Alternate
- SE = Special exempt
- PR = Protected ranking
- ITF = ITF entry
- JE = Junior exempt
- w/o = Walkover
- r = Retired
- d = Defaulted
- SR = Special ranking

=== Draw ===
First round
1	(Mexico) S González (United States) S Lipsky	6	6
WC	(United States) A El-Effendi (United Kingdom) D Walsh	4	2
WC	(United States) Alex Pier (United States) M Russell	6^{2}	2
(Argentina) F Delbonis (Argentina) G Pella	7^{7}	6
4	(United Kingdom) K Skupski (United Kingdom) N Skupski	6	6
WC	(United States) A Kuznetsov (Germany) M Zverev	3	4
(Australia) S Groth (Australia) C Guccione	4	6	[10]
(Netherlands) I Sijsling (Sweden) A Siljeström	6	3	[8]
(Netherlands) J Huta Galung (Czech Republic) L Rosol	6	6
(Kazakhstan) A Golubev (Italy) P Lorenzi	3	4
(Australia) P Hanley (United States) R Ram	5	6	[10]
3	(Austria) O Marach (Canada) V Pospisil	7	2	[2]
PR	(Italy) S Bolelli (Spain) DG Traver	6	5	[11]
(Russia) M Elgin (Russia) T Gabashvili	4	7	[9]
(Australia) J-P Smith (New Zealand) M Venus	6	7^{7}
2	(United States) N Monroe (Germany) S Stadler	4	6^{4}

Quarterfinals
1	(Mexico) S González (United States) S Lipsky	6	6^{2}	[10]
(Argentina) F Delbonis (Argentina) G Pella	2	7^{7}	[8]
4	(United Kingdom) K Skupski (United Kingdom) N Skupski	6^{3}	4
(Australia) S Groth (Australia) C Guccione	7^{7}	6
(Netherlands) J Huta Galung (Czech Republic) L Rosol	7	2	[10]
(Australia) P Hanley (United States) R Ram	5	6	[7]
PR	(Italy) S Bolelli (Spain) DG Traver	3	7	[8]
(Australia) J-P Smith (New Zealand) M Venus	6	5	[10]

Semifinals
1	(Mexico) S González (United States) S Lipsky	6^{3}	6	[10]
(Australia) S Groth (Australia) C Guccione	7^{7}	4	[8]
(Netherlands) J Huta Galung (Czech Republic) L Rosol	7	4	[7]
(Australia) J-P Smith (New Zealand) M Venus	5	6	[10]

Final
1	(Mexico) S González (United States) S Lipsky	4	7^{9}	[10]
(Australia) J-P Smith (New Zealand) M Venus	6	6^{7}	[7]
