= 2015 Irving Tennis Classic – Doubles =

Doubles
- 2015 Irving Tennis Classic

Final
- Champions: (Sweden) Robert Lindstedt (Ukraine) Sergiy Stakhovsky
- Runners-up: (Germany) Benjamin Becker (Germany) Philipp Petzschner
- Score: 6–4, 6–4

Events
Singles	Doubles
← 2014 ·	Irving Tennis Classic	· 2016 →

Santiago González and Scott Lipsky were the defending champions, but González did not participate. Lipsky partnered with Treat Huey, but lost in the quarterfinals to Pablo Andújar and Diego Schwartzman.

== Seeds ==
1. (Poland) Mariusz Fyrstenberg / (Spain) David Marrero (first round)
2. (United States) Eric Butorac / (United States) Rajeev Ram (first round)
3. (Philippines) Treat Huey / (United States) Scott Lipsky (quarterfinals)
4. (Sweden) Johan Brunström / (United States) Nicholas Monroe (first round)

== Draw ==
=== Key ===
- Q = Qualifier
- WC = Wild card
- LL = Lucky loser
- Alt = Alternate
- SE = Special exempt
- PR = Protected ranking
- ITF = ITF entry
- JE = Junior exempt
- w/o = Walkover
- r = Retired
- d = Defaulted
- SR = Special ranking

First round
1	(Poland) M Fyrstenberg (Spain) D Marrero	2	4
(United States) D Kudla (Russia) A Rublev	6	6
(Germany) D Brown (Germany) J-L Struff	3	6	[7]
(Slovenia) A Bedene (Bosnia and Herzegovina) D Džumhur	6	3	[10]
4	(Sweden) J Brunström (United States) N Monroe	2	1
(Luxembourg) G Müller (Pakistan) A-u-H Qureshi	6	6
(Sweden) R Lindstedt (Ukraine) S Stakhovsky	6	6
WC	(United States) Nate Eazor (United States) Chase Wood	0	2
WC	(United States) Alex Pier (United States) M Russell	2	1
(Spain) P Andújar (Argentina) D Schwartzman	6	6
(Brazil) T Bellucci (Sweden) A Siljeström	4	6^{6}
3	(Philippines) T Huey (United States) S Lipsky	6	7^{8}
(United Kingdom) K Edmund (United Kingdom) J Ward	6	1	[10]
WC	(United States) H Johnson (United States) Y Johnson	4	6	[7]
(Germany) B Becker (Germany) P Petzschner	6^{6}	7^{7}	[10]
2	(United States) E Butorac (United States) R Ram	7^{8}	6^{5}	[6]

Quarterfinals
(United States) D Kudla (Russia) A Rublev
(Slovenia) A Bedene (Bosnia and Herzegovina) D Džumhur	w/o
(Luxembourg) G Müller (Pakistan) A-u-H Qureshi	6^{3}	6^{2}
(Sweden) R Lindstedt (Ukraine) S Stakhovsky	7^{7}	7^{7}
(Spain) P Andújar (Argentina) D Schwartzman	6	6
3	(Philippines) T Huey (United States) S Lipsky	4	2
(United Kingdom) K Edmund (United Kingdom) J Ward
(Germany) B Becker (Germany) P Petzschner	w/o

Semifinals
(Slovenia) A Bedene (Bosnia and Herzegovina) D Džumhur	2	2
(Sweden) R Lindstedt (Ukraine) S Stakhovsky	6	6
(Spain) P Andújar (Argentina) D Schwartzman	2	0
(Germany) B Becker (Germany) P Petzschner	6	6

Final
(Sweden) R Lindstedt (Ukraine) S Stakhovsky	6	6
(Germany) B Becker (Germany) P Petzschner	4	4
