= 2016 Irving Tennis Classic – Singles =

Singles
- 2016 Irving Tennis Classic

Final
- Champion: (Spain) Marcel Granollers
- Runner-up: (United Kingdom) Aljaž Bedene
- Score: 6–1, 6–1

Events
Singles	Doubles
← 2015 ·	Irving Tennis Classic	· 2017 →

Aljaž Bedene was the defending champion but failed to defend his title, losing to Marcel Granollers 1–6, 1–6 in the final.

== Seeds ==
1. (Spain) Guillermo García-López (withdrew)
2. (Luxembourg) Gilles Müller (second round)
3. (Czech Republic) Lukáš Rosol (quarterfinals)
4. (United Kingdom) Aljaž Bedene (final)
5. (Spain) Íñigo Cervantes (first round)
6. (United States) Denis Kudla (first round)
7. (Spain) Daniel Muñoz de la Nava (withdrew)
8. (Ukraine) Illya Marchenko (second round)

== Draw ==
=== Key ===
- Q = Qualifier
- WC = Wild card
- LL = Lucky loser
- Alt = Alternate
- ITF = ITF entry
- PR = Protected ranking
- SR = Special ranking
- SE = Special exempt
- JE = Junior exempt
- JR = Junior Accelerator Programme entrant
- CO = College Accelerator Programme entrant
- NG = Next Gen Accelerator Program entrant
- w/o = Walkover
- r = Retired
- d = Defaulted

=== Finals ===
Semifinals
Alt	(United States) Jared Donaldson	4	3
4	(United Kingdom) Aljaž Bedene	6	6
(Spain) Marcel Granollers	6	6
(Croatia) Ivan Dodig	0	1

Final
4	(United Kingdom) Aljaž Bedene	1	1
(Spain) Marcel Granollers	6	6

=== Top half ===
First round
LL	(New Zealand) M Venus	6	3	6
(Italy) M Cecchinato	3	6	3
Alt	(United States) T Smyczek	5	4
Alt	(United States) J Donaldson	7	6
WC	(United States) R Harrison	7^{10}	4	6^{6}
Alt	(Russia) A Rublev	6^{8}	6	7^{8}
(Russia) E Donskoy	6^{8}	7^{7}	6
5	(Spain) Í Cervantes	7^{10}	6^{4}	4
4	(United Kingdom) A Bedene	6	6
Alt	(Brazil) R Dutra Silva	3	2
WC	(Russia) D Tursunov	6	6
(United States) D Young	4	1
Alt	(Germany) B Becker	4	3
WC	(United States) F Tiafoe	6	6
Q	(Chinese Taipei) J Jung	6	6^{5}	2
LL	(Ecuador) G Lapentti	4	7^{7}	6

Second round
LL	(New Zealand) M Venus	4	7^{9}	3
Alt	(United States) J Donaldson	6	6^{7}	6
Alt	(Russia) A Rublev	7^{8}	1	6
(Russia) E Donskoy	6^{6}	6	3
4	(United Kingdom) A Bedene	3	6	7^{7}
WC	(Russia) D Tursunov	6	4	6^{3}
WC	(United States) F Tiafoe	6	2	6
LL	(Ecuador) G Lapentti	3	6	2

Quarterfinals
Alt	(United States) J Donaldson	6	6
Alt	(Russia) A Rublev	4	1
4	(United Kingdom) A Bedene	7^{7}	3	7^{7}
WC	(United States) F Tiafoe	6^{5}	6	6^{4}

Semifinals
Alt	(United States) J Donaldson	4	3
4	(United Kingdom) A Bedene	6	6

=== Bottom half ===
First round
6	(United States) D Kudla	3	6	3
Alt	(Germany) M Zverev	6	3	6
(Colombia) S Giraldo	5	1^{r}
(Spain) M Granollers	7	3
Alt	(Australia) J-P Smith	2	5
(Uzbekistan) D Istomin	6	7
Q	(Germany) Jakob Sude	2	6^{2}
3	(Czech Republic) L Rosol	6	7^{7}
8	(Ukraine) I Marchenko	6^{5}	7^{7}	6
Q	(Germany) P Petzschner	7^{7}	6^{4}	3
(Croatia) I Dodig	6	6
Alt	(Slovakia) J Kovalík	2	2
(Argentina) D Schwartzman	6	2
Alt	(Germany) M Berrer	2	1^{r}
Q	(United Kingdom) C Norrie	4	3
2/WC	(Luxembourg) G Müller	6	6

Second round
Alt	(Germany) M Zverev	6	2	5
(Spain) M Granollers	1	6	7
(Uzbekistan) D Istomin	2	6	6^{5}
3	(Czech Republic) L Rosol	6	1	7^{7}
8	(Ukraine) I Marchenko	3	6	3
(Croatia) I Dodig	6	1	6
(Argentina) D Schwartzman	7^{7}	6
2/WC	(Luxembourg) G Müller	6^{4}	3

Quarterfinals
(Spain) M Granollers	6	6
3	(Czech Republic) L Rosol	4	2
(Croatia) I Dodig	7^{7}	7
(Argentina) D Schwartzman	6^{2}	5

Semifinals
(Spain) M Granollers	6	6
(Croatia) I Dodig	0	1
