= 2016 Irving Tennis Classic =

- Date: 12–20 March
- Edition: 5th
- Draw: 32S / 16D
- Prize money: $125,000+H
- Surface: Hard
- Location: Irving, Texas, United States

Champions

Singles
- (Spain) Marcel Granollers

Doubles
- (United States) Nicholas Monroe / (Pakistan) Aisam-ul-Haq Qureshi
← 2015 ·	Irving Tennis Classic	· 2017 →

The 2016 Irving Tennis Classic was a professional tennis tournament played on hard courts. It was the fifth edition of the tournament which was part of the 2016 ATP Challenger Tour. It took place in Irving, Texas, United States between 12 and 20 March 2016.

== Singles main-draw entrants ==
=== Seeds ===
Country	Player	Rank^{1}	Seed
ESP	Guillermo García López	38	1
LUX	Gilles Müller	45	2
CZE	Lukáš Rosol	50	3
GBR	Aljaž Bedene	51	4
ESP	Íñigo Cervantes	59	5
USA	Denis Kudla	66	6
ESP	Daniel Muñoz de la Nava	60	7
UKR	Illya Marchenko	72	8

- ^{1} Rankings as of March 7, 2016

=== Other entrants ===
The following players received wildcards into the singles main draw:

- (United States) Ryan Harrison
- (Russia) Dmitry Tursunov
- (United States) Frances Tiafoe
- (Luxembourg) Gilles Müller

The following players entered the main draw as alternates:

- (Germany) Benjamin Becker
- (Germany) Michael Berrer
- (United States) Jared Donaldson
- (Brazil) Rogério Dutra Silva
- (Slovakia) Jozef Kovalík
- (Russia) Andrey Rublev
- (Australia) John-Patrick Smith
- (United States) Tim Smyczek
- (Germany) Mischa Zverev

The following players received entry from the qualifying draw:

- (Chinese Taipei) Jason Jung
- (Germany) Jakob Sude
- (Germany) Philipp Petzschner
- (United Kingdom) Cameron Norrie

The following players entered the singles main draw as lucky losers:

- (Ecuador) Nicolás Lapentti
- (New Zealand) Michael Venus

== Champions ==
=== Singles ===
- (Spain) Marcel Granollers def. (United Kingdom) Aljaž Bedene, 6–1, 6–1

=== Doubles ===
- (United States) Nicholas Monroe / (Pakistan) Aisam-ul-Haq Qureshi def. (Australia) Chris Guccione / (Brazil) André Sá, 6–2, 5–7, [10–4]
