= 2017 Irving Tennis Classic – Doubles =

Doubles
- 2017 Irving Tennis Classic

Final
- Champions: (New Zealand) Marcus Daniell (Brazil) Marcelo Demoliner
- Runners-up: (Austria) Oliver Marach (France) Fabrice Martin
- Score: 6–3, 6–4

Events
Singles	Doubles
← 2016 ·	Irving Tennis Classic	· 2018 →

Nicholas Monroe and Aisam-ul-Haq Qureshi were the defending champions but only Monroe chose to defend his title, partnering Brian Baker. Monroe lost in the first round to Purav Raja and Divij Sharan.

Marcus Daniell and Marcelo Demoliner won the title after defeating Oliver Marach and Fabrice Martin 6–3, 6–4 in the final.

== Seeds ==
1. (Austria) Oliver Marach / (France) Fabrice Martin (final)
2. (United States) Brian Baker / (United States) Nicholas Monroe (first round)
3. (Netherlands) Wesley Koolhof / (Netherlands) Matwé Middelkoop (first round)
4. (Mexico) Santiago González / (New Zealand) Michael Venus (semifinals)

== Draw ==
=== Key ===
- Q = Qualifier
- WC = Wild card
- LL = Lucky loser
- Alt = Alternate
- SE = Special exempt
- PR = Protected ranking
- ITF = ITF entry
- JE = Junior exempt
- w/o = Walkover
- r = Retired
- d = Defaulted
- SR = Special ranking

First round
1	(Austria) O Marach (France) F Martin	6	3	[10]
WC	(Germany) D Brown (India) L Paes	1	6	[4]
WC	(Germany) P Petzschner (Austria) A Peya	6	6
(India) R Bopanna (Chinese Taipei) Y-h Lu	4	4
3	(Netherlands) W Koolhof (Netherlands) M Middelkoop	2	5
(Israel) J Erlich (United States) S Lipsky	6	7
(Sweden) J Brunström (Croatia) M Pavić	6^{2}	5
(France) J Chardy (Sweden) R Lindstedt	7^{7}	7
(United States) J Cerretani (Croatia) N Mektić	7^{7}	6
(Argentina) F Bagnis (Argentina) H Zeballos	6^{3}	4
(Sweden) A Siljeström (Germany) J-L Struff	3	6	[2]
4	(Mexico) S González (New Zealand) M Venus	6	3	[10]
WC	(United States) Alex Pier (United States) T Smyczek	0	2
(New Zealand) M Daniell (Brazil) M Demoliner	6	6
(India) P Raja (India) D Sharan	3	7^{7}	[10]
2	(United States) B Baker (United States) N Monroe	6	6^{3}	[5]

Quarterfinals
1	(Austria) O Marach (France) F Martin	6	6
WC	(Germany) P Petzschner (Austria) A Peya	3	4
(Israel) J Erlich (United States) S Lipsky	4	6^{2}
(France) J Chardy (Sweden) R Lindstedt	6	7^{7}
(United States) J Cerretani (Croatia) N Mektić	4	6	[8]
4	(Mexico) S González (New Zealand) M Venus	6	2	[10]
(New Zealand) M Daniell (Brazil) M Demoliner	2	6	[10]
(India) P Raja (India) D Sharan	6	3	[4]

Semifinals
1	(Austria) O Marach (France) F Martin	7	6
(France) J Chardy (Sweden) R Lindstedt	5	4
4	(Mexico) S González (New Zealand) M Venus	6	3	[4]
(New Zealand) M Daniell (Brazil) M Demoliner	1	6	[10]

Final
1	(Austria) O Marach (France) F Martin	3	4
(New Zealand) M Daniell (Brazil) M Demoliner	6	6
