= 2017 Irving Tennis Classic =

- Date: 14–19 March
- Edition: 6th
- Category: ATP Challenger Tour
- Draw: 32S/32Q/16D
- Prize money: $150,000+H
- Surface: Hard / Outdoor
- Location: Irving, United States

Champions

Singles
- (United Kingdom) Aljaž Bedene

Doubles
- (New Zealand) Marcus Daniell / (Brazil) Marcelo Demoliner
← 2016 ·	Irving Tennis Classic	· 2018 →

The 2017 Irving Tennis Classic was a professional tennis tournament played on hard courts. It was the sixth edition of the tournament which was part of the 2017 ATP Challenger Tour. It took place in Irving, United States between 14 and 19 March 2017.

== Singles main-draw entrants ==
=== Seeds ===
Country	Player	Rank^{1}	Seed
ESP	Marcel Granollers	36	1
ITA	Paolo Lorenzi	38	2
RUS	Karen Khachanov	52	3
GEO	Nikoloz Basilashvili	55	4
CRO	Borna Ćorić	59	5
RUS	Andrey Kuznetsov	62	6
GER	Jan-Lennard Struff	63	7
TPE	Lu Yen-hsun	65	8

- ^{1} Rankings as of March 6, 2017.

=== Other entrants ===
The following players received wildcards into the singles main draw:

- (Germany) Benjamin Becker
- (Republic of Ireland) James McGee
- (United States) Tim Smyczek
- (Ukraine) Sergiy Stakhovsky

The following players received entry into the singles main draw as alternates:

- (United Kingdom) Aljaž Bedene
- (United States) Jared Donaldson
- (Colombia) Santiago Giraldo
- (Russia) Konstantin Kravchuk
- (Slovakia) Lukáš Lacko
- (United States) Frances Tiafoe

The following players received entry from the qualifying draw:

- (United States) Denis Kudla
- (Netherlands) Matwé Middelkoop
- (Russia) Andrey Rublev
- (Czech Republic) Lukáš Rosol

The following player received entry into the singles main draw as a lucky loser:

- (Russia) Teymuraz Gabashvili

== Champions ==
=== Singles ===
- (United Kingdom) Aljaž Bedene def. (Kazakhstan) Mikhail Kukushkin 6–4, 3–6, 6–1.

=== Doubles ===
- (New Zealand) Marcus Daniell / (Brazil) Marcelo Demoliner def. (Austria) Oliver Marach / (France) Fabrice Martin 6–3, 6–4.
