= 2016 Irving Tennis Classic – Doubles =

Doubles
- 2016 Irving Tennis Classic

Final
- Champion: (United States) Nicholas Monroe (Pakistan) Aisam-ul-Haq Qureshi
- Runner-up: (Australia) Chris Guccione (Brazil) André Sá
- Score: 6–2, 5–7, [10–4]

Events
Singles	Doubles
← 2015 ·	Irving Tennis Classic	· 2017 →

Robert Lindstedt and Sergiy Stakhovsky were the defending champions, but didn't participate.

Nicholas Monroe and Aisam-ul-Haq Qureshi won the title, defeating Chris Guccione and André Sá 6–2, 5–7, [10–4].

== Seeds ==
1. (United States) Nicholas Monroe / (Pakistan) Aisam-ul-Haq Qureshi (champions)
2. (Australia) Chris Guccione / (Brazil) André Sá (final)
3. (United Kingdom) Colin Fleming / (United Kingdom) Neal Skupski (semifinals)
4. (India) Leander Paes / (Czech Republic) Lukáš Rosol (semifinals)

== Draw ==
=== Key ===
- Q = Qualifier
- WC = Wild card
- LL = Lucky loser
- Alt = Alternate
- SE = Special exempt
- PR = Protected ranking
- ITF = ITF entry
- JE = Junior exempt
- w/o = Walkover
- r = Retired
- d = Defaulted
- SR = Special ranking

=== Draw ===
First round
(Italy) M Cecchinato (Spain) Í Cervantes	6	6
(India) P Raja (South Africa) R Roelofse	4	3
3	(United Kingdom) C Fleming (United Kingdom) N Skupski	7^{9}	6
(Germany) P Petzschner (Germany) M Zverev	6^{7}	2
WC	(United States) Nate Eazor (United States) Chase Wood	3	6	[10]
WC	(United States) Alex Pier (United States) T Smyczek	6	2	[7]
(Australia) J-P Smith (New Zealand) M Venus	6^{10}	6	[10]
(Uzbekistan) D Istomin (Russia) D Tursunov	7^{12}	4	[8]
(Brazil) R Dutra Silva (Ecuador) G Lapentti	3	4
4	(India) L Paes (Czech Republic) L Rosol	6	6
WC	(Germany) B Becker (The Bahamas) M Knowles	3	4
(Chinese Taipei) J Jung (Germany) Jakob Sude	6	6

Quarterfinals
1	(United States) N Monroe (Pakistan) A-u-H Qureshi	6	6
(Italy) M Cecchinato (Spain) Í Cervantes	3	4
3	(United Kingdom) C Fleming (United Kingdom) N Skupski	6	6
WC	(United States) N Eazor (United States) C Wood	0	1
(Australia) J-P Smith (New Zealand) M Venus	2	4
4	(India) L Paes (Czech Republic) L Rosol	6	6
(Chinese Taipei) J Jung (Germany) J Sude	4	6	[6]
2	(Australia) C Guccione (Brazil) A Sá	6	4	[10]

Semifinals
1	(United States) N Monroe (Pakistan) A-u-H Qureshi	3	7	[10]
3	(United Kingdom) C Fleming (United Kingdom) N Skupski	6	5	[8]
4	(India) L Paes (Czech Republic) L Rosol	3	2
2	(Australia) C Guccione (Brazil) A Sá	6	6

Final
1	(United States) N Monroe (Pakistan) A-u-H Qureshi	6	5	[10]
2	(Australia) C Guccione (Brazil) A Sá	2	7	[4]
