= 2018 Irving Tennis Classic =

- Date: 13–18 March
- Edition: 7th
- Draw: 32S / 16D
- Surface: Hard
- Location: Irving, Texas, United States

Champions

Singles
- (Kazakhstan) Mikhail Kukushkin

Doubles
- (Germany) Philipp Petzschner / (Austria) Alexander Peya
← 2017 ·	Irving Tennis Classic

The 2018 Irving Tennis Classic was a professional tennis tournament played on hard courts. It was the seventh edition of the tournament which was part of the 2018 ATP Challenger Tour. It took place in Irving, Texas, United States between 13 and 18 March 2018.

== Singles main-draw entrants ==
=== Seeds ===
Country	Player	Rank^{1}	Seed
JPN	Yūichi Sugita	40	1
USA	Jared Donaldson	48	2
USA	Steve Johnson	52	3
HUN	Márton Fucsovics	65	4
FRA	Gilles Simon	70	5
GER	Maximilian Marterer	73	6
~~RUS~~	~~Evgeny Donskoy~~	~~76~~	~~7~~
ITA	Thomas Fabbiano	77	8

- ^{1} Rankings as of March 5, 2018.

=== Other entrants ===
The following players received wildcards into the singles main draw:

- (Australia) Alex de Minaur
- (Italy) Thomas Fabbiano
- (Hungary) Márton Fucsovics
- (Germany) Philipp Petzschner

The following players received entry into the singles main draw as alternates:

- (Italy) Matteo Berrettini
- (Germany) Sebastian Fanselow
- (United States) Bjorn Fratangelo
- (Colombia) Daniel Elahi Galán
- (United States) Austin Krajicek
- (Serbia) Peđa Krstin
- (United States) Michael Mmoh
- (United States) Tim Smyczek
- (Ukraine) Sergiy Stakhovsky
- (Sweden) Elias Ymer

The following players received entry from the qualifying draw:

- (Cyprus) Petros Chrysochos
- (United States) Patrick Kypson
- (Israel) Or Ram-Harel
- (France) Arthur Rinderknech

The following players received entry as lucky losers:

- (Mexico) Tigre Hank
- (Antigua and Barbuda) Jody Maginley

== Champions ==
=== Singles ===
- (Kazakhstan) Mikhail Kukushkin def. (Italy) Matteo Berrettini 6–2, 3–6, 6–1.

=== Doubles ===
- (Germany) Philipp Petzschner / (Austria) Alexander Peya def. (Moldova) Radu Albot / (Australia) Matthew Ebden 6–2, 6–4.
