= 2017 Irving Tennis Classic – Singles =

Singles
- 2017 Irving Tennis Classic

Final
- Champion: (United Kingdom) Aljaž Bedene
- Runner-up: (Kazakhstan) Mikhail Kukushkin
- Score: 6–4, 3–6, 6–1

Events
Singles	Doubles
← 2016 ·	Irving Tennis Classic	· 2018 →

Marcel Granollers was the defending champion but lost in the first round to Radu Albot.

Aljaž Bedene won the title after defeating Mikhail Kukushkin 6–4, 3–6, 6–1 in the final.

== Seeds ==
1. (Spain) Marcel Granollers (first round)
2. (Italy) Paolo Lorenzi (first round)
3. (Russia) Karen Khachanov (quarterfinals)
4. (Georgia (country)) Nikoloz Basilashvili (second round)
5. (Croatia) Borna Ćorić (second round)
6. (Russia) Andrey Kuznetsov (first round, retired)
7. (Germany) Jan-Lennard Struff (first round)
8. (Chinese Taipei) Lu Yen-hsun (second round)

== Draw ==
=== Key ===
- Q = Qualifier
- WC = Wild card
- LL = Lucky loser
- Alt = Alternate
- SE = Special exempt
- PR = Protected ranking
- ITF = ITF entry
- JE = Junior exempt
- w/o = Walkover
- r = Retired
- d = Defaulted
- SR = Special ranking

=== Finals ===
Semifinals
(Germany) Dustin Brown	4	4
(Kazakhstan) Mikhail Kukushkin	6	6
Q	(Russia) Andrey Rublev	6	6^{6}	2
Alt	(United Kingdom) Aljaž Bedene	1	7^{8}	6

Final
(Kazakhstan) Mikhail Kukushkin	4	6	1
Alt	(United Kingdom) Aljaž Bedene	6	3	6

=== Top half ===
First round
1	(Spain) M Granollers	6	4	6^{4}
(Moldova) R Albot	1	6	7^{7}
WC	(United States) T Smyczek	7	7^{7}
(Argentina) F Bagnis	5	6^{3}
(Germany) D Brown	6	6
Q	(Netherlands) M Middelkoop	4	2
(Argentina) H Zeballos	6^{3}	3
5	(Croatia) B Ćorić	7^{7}	6
3	(Russia) K Khachanov	6	6
(Ukraine) I Marchenko	2	4
Alt	(Slovakia) L Lacko	6	4	6
WC	(Ukraine) S Stakhovsky	3	6	3
(Kazakhstan) M Kukushkin	4	6	6
Q	(United States) D Kudla	6	3	1
WC	(Republic of Ireland) J McGee	3	2
8	(Chinese Taipei) Y-h Lu	6	6

Second round
(Moldova) R Albot	3	3
WC	(United States) T Smyczek	6	6
(Germany) D Brown	4	6	6
5	(Croatia) B Ćorić	6	4	4
3	(Russia) K Khachanov	6	3	6
Alt	(Slovakia) L Lacko	4	6	1
(Kazakhstan) M Kukushkin	6	4	6
8	(Chinese Taipei) Y-h Lu	2	6	4

Quarterfinals
WC	(United States) T Smyczek	4	2
(Germany) D Brown	6	6
3	(Russia) K Khachanov	4	6^{5}
(Kazakhstan) M Kukushkin	6	7^{7}

Semifinals
(Germany) D Brown	4	4
(Kazakhstan) M Kukushkin	6	6

=== Bottom half ===
First round
7	(Germany) J-L Struff	4	6^{5}
Q	(Russia) A Rublev	6	7^{7}
WC	(Germany) B Becker	7	6
Alt	(Colombia) S Giraldo	5	2
(Argentina) R Olivo	6	1	2
(France) J Chardy	4	6	6
LL	(Russia) T Gabashvili	1	4
4	(Georgia (country)) N Basilashvili	6	6
6	(Russia) A Kuznetsov	1	6	1^{r}
Alt	(United States) J Donaldson	6	2	3
Alt	(United States) F Tiafoe	6	6
Alt	(Russia) K Kravchuk	1	4
Q	(Czech Republic) L Rosol	3	7	4
(Brazil) T Bellucci	6	5	6
Alt	(United Kingdom) A Bedene	6	7^{7}
2	(Italy) P Lorenzi	4	6^{5}

Second round
Q	(Russia) A Rublev	6	6
WC	(Germany) B Becker	2	4
(France) J Chardy	6	6
4	(Georgia (country)) N Basilashvili	2	1
Alt	(United States) J Donaldson	7	1	7
Alt	(United States) F Tiafoe	5	6	5
(Brazil) T Bellucci	6	6^{6}	1
Alt	(United Kingdom) A Bedene	4	7^{8}	6

Quarterfinals
Q	(Russia) A Rublev	7	6
(France) J Chardy	5	4
Alt	(United States) J Donaldson	5	3
Alt	(United Kingdom) A Bedene	7	6

Semifinals
Q	(Russia) A Rublev	6	6^{6}	2
Alt	(United Kingdom) A Bedene	1	7^{8}	6
