= 2018 Irving Tennis Classic – Doubles =

Doubles
- 2018 Irving Tennis Classic

Final
- Champions: (Germany) Philipp Petzschner (Austria) Alexander Peya
- Runners-up: (Moldova) Radu Albot (Australia) Matthew Ebden
- Score: 6–2, 6–4

Events
Singles	Doubles
← 2017 ·	Irving Tennis Classic

Marcus Daniell and Marcelo Demoliner were the defending champions but chose not to defend their title.

Philipp Petzschner and Alexander Peya won the title after defeating Radu Albot and Matthew Ebden 6–2, 6–4 in the final.

== Seeds ==
1. (Finland) Henri Kontinen / (Australia) John Peers (first round)
2. (Japan) Ben McLachlan / (Chile) Julio Peralta (quarterfinals)
3. (United Kingdom) Dominic Inglot / (United Kingdom) Neal Skupski (first round)
4. (United States) Nicholas Monroe / (United States) Jackson Withrow (semifinals)

== Draw ==
=== Key ===
- Q = Qualifier
- WC = Wild card
- LL = Lucky loser
- Alt = Alternate
- SE = Special exempt
- PR = Protected ranking
- ITF = ITF entry
- JE = Junior exempt
- w/o = Walkover
- r = Retired
- d = Defaulted
- SR = Special ranking

First round
1	(Finland) H Kontinen (Australia) J Peers	5	5
(Germany) P Petzschner (Austria) A Peya	7	7
WC	(Antigua and Barbuda) J Maginley (Israel) Or Ram-Harel	6	2	[5]
(Italy) M Berrettini (Italy) T Fabbiano	4	6	[10]
3	(United Kingdom) D Inglot (United Kingdom) N Skupski	6	1	[6]
(Netherlands) W Koolhof (New Zealand) A Sitak	3	6	[10]
(Hungary) M Fucsovics (Ukraine) S Stakhovsky	4	4
(United States) A Krajicek (Slovakia) L Lacko	6	6
(Philippines) T Huey (India) P Raja	4	6^{6}
(United States) S Lipsky (India) D Sharan	6	7^{8}
WC	(Mexico) H Hach Verdugo (United States) T Smyczek	3	6^{3}
4	(United States) N Monroe (United States) J Withrow	6	7^{7}
(Moldova) R Albot (Australia) M Ebden	6	6
WC	(Cyprus) P Chrysochos (United States) Ian Dempster	0	3
(Israel) J Erlich (Sweden) R Lindstedt	6^{6}	4
2	(Japan) B McLachlan (Chile) J Peralta	7^{8}	6

Quarterfinals
(Germany) P Petzschner (Austria) A Peya	6	4	[10]
(Italy) M Berrettini (Italy) T Fabbiano	3	6	[6]
(Netherlands) W Koolhof (New Zealand) A Sitak	6	6
(United States) A Krajicek (Slovakia) L Lacko	1	4
(United States) S Lipsky (India) D Sharan	3	2
4	(United States) N Monroe (United States) J Withrow	6	6
(Moldova) R Albot (Australia) M Ebden	4	6	[10]
2	(Japan) B McLachlan (Chile) J Peralta	6	2	[4]

Semifinals
(Germany) P Petzschner (Austria) A Peya	6	7
(Netherlands) W Koolhof (New Zealand) A Sitak	4	5
4	(United States) N Monroe (United States) J Withrow	6	2	[9]
(Moldova) R Albot (Australia) M Ebden	1	6	[11]

Final
(Germany) P Petzschner (Austria) A Peya	6	6
(Moldova) R Albot (Australia) M Ebden	2	4
