= 2014 Irving Tennis Classic =

- Date: 10–16 March
- Edition: 3rd
- Draw: 32S / 16D
- Prize money: $125,000+H
- Surface: Hard
- Location: Irving, United States

Champions

Singles
- (Czech Republic) Lukáš Rosol

Doubles
- (Mexico) Santiago González / (United States) Scott Lipsky
← 2013 ·	Irving Tennis Classic	· 2015 →

The 2014 Irving Tennis Classic was a professional tennis tournament played on hard courts. It was the third edition of the tournament which will be part of the 2014 ATP Challenger Tour. It took place in Irving, United States between 10 and 16 March 2013.

== Singles main-draw entrants ==
=== Seeds ===
Country	Player	Rank^{1}	Seed
CAN	Vasek Pospisil	27	1
ARG	Federico Delbonis	44	2
CZE	Lukáš Rosol	47	3
NED	Igor Sijsling	55	4
UZB	Denis Istomin	56	5
RUS	Teymuraz Gabashvili	60	6
KAZ	Andrey Golubev	70	7
IND	Somdev Devvarman	78	8

- ^{1} Rankings are as of March 10, 2014.

=== Other entrants ===
The following players received wildcards into the singles main draw:

- (South Africa) Jean Anderson
- (United States) Rajeev Ram
- (United States) Bobby Reynolds
- (Germany) Mischa Zverev

The following players received entry from the qualifying draw:

- (United States) Alex Kuznetsov
- (Ukraine) Illya Marchenko
- (United States) Rhyne Williams
- (Chinese Taipei) Jimmy Wang

== Champions ==
=== Singles ===
- (Czech Republic) Lukáš Rosol def. (United States) Steve Johnson, 6–0, 6–3

=== Doubles ===
- (Mexico) Santiago González / (United States) Scott Lipsky def. (Australia) John-Patrick Smith / (New Zealand) Michael Venus, 4–6, 7–6^{(9–7)}, [10–7]
