= 2012 Dallas Tennis Classic – Doubles =

Doubles
- 2012 Dallas Tennis Classic

Final
- Champions: (Mexico) Santiago González (United States) Scott Lipsky
- Runners-up: (United States) Bobby Reynolds (United States) Michael Russell
- Score: 6–4, 6–3

Details
- Draw: 16 (1 Alt / 3 WC )

Events
| Singles | Doubles |
| Dallas Tennis Classic | · 2013 → |

Santiago González and Scott Lipsky won the first edition of the tournament by defeating Bobby Reynolds and Michael Russell 6–4, 6–3 in the final.

== Seeds ==
1. (Mexico) Santiago González / (United States) Scott Lipsky (champions)
2. (Germany) Martin Emmrich / (Sweden) Andreas Siljeström (quarterfinals)
3. (Russia) Alex Bogomolov Jr. / (Australia) Jordan Kerr (withdrew)
4. (Croatia) Marin Čilić / (United States) Nicholas Monroe (quarterfinals)

== Draw ==
=== Key ===
- Q = Qualifier
- WC = Wild card
- LL = Lucky loser
- Alt = Alternate
- SE = Special exempt
- PR = Protected ranking
- ITF = ITF entry
- JE = Junior exempt
- w/o = Walkover
- r = Retired
- d = Defaulted
- SR = Special ranking

=== Draw ===
First round
1 | (Mexico) S González (United States) S Lipsky | 6 | 6
(Argentina) Bernardo Carberol (Chinese Taipei) Y-H Lu | 1 | 2
WC | (United States) Adham El-Effendi (United Kingdom) Darren Walsh | 6 | 6
(Slovakia) L Lacko (Czech Republic) L Rosol | 4 | 4
Alt | (Italy) V Santopadre (Italy) P Starace | 6 | 5 | [7]
(Germany) B Becker (Germany) B Phau | 4 | 7 | [10]
(United States) A Kuznetsov (Germany) M Zverev | 6 | 6
WC | (Bosnia and Herzegovina) A Delić (United States) Alex Pier | 3 | 4
(United States) B Reynolds (United States) M Russell | 6 | 7
(Italy) S Bolelli (Italy) T Fabbiano | 4 | 5
WC | (United States) Sasha Ermakov (United States) Shane Vinsant | 2 | 0
4 | (Croatia) M Čilić (United States) N Monroe | 6 | 6
(Italy) F Cipolla (Italy) A Seppi | 7 | 7^{8}
(Portugal) G Elias (Argentina) L Mayer | 5 | 6^{6}
(Russia) M Elgin (Turkey) M İlhan | 3 | 7^{7} | [7]
2 | (Germany) M Emmrich (Sweden) A Siljeström | 6 | 6^{5} | [10]

Quarterfinals
1 | (Mexico) S González (United States) S Lipsky | 6 | 3 | [10]
WC | (United States) A El-Effendi (United Kingdom) D Walsh | 3 | 6 | [7]
(Germany) B Becker (Germany) B Phau | 4 | 4
(United States) A Kuznetsov (Germany) M Zverev | 6 | 6
(United States) B Reynolds (United States) M Russell | 6 | 6
4 | (Croatia) M Čilić (United States) N Monroe | 4 | 4
(Italy) F Cipolla (Italy) A Seppi | 6 | 6
2 | (Germany) M Emmrich (Sweden) A Siljeström | 4 | 4

Semifinals
1 | (Mexico) S González (United States) S Lipsky | 6 | 7^{10}
(United States) A Kuznetsov (Germany) M Zverev | 3 | 6^{8}
(United States) B Reynolds (United States) M Russell | 6 | 6
(Italy) F Cipolla (Italy) A Seppi | 2 | 2

Final
1 | (Mexico) S González (United States) S Lipsky | 6 | 6
(United States) B Reynolds (United States) M Russell | 4 | 3
