= 2013 Dallas Tennis Classic – Singles =

Singles
- 2013 Dallas Tennis Classic

Final
- Champion: (Austria) Jürgen Melzer
- Runner-up: (United States) Denis Kudla
- Score: 6–4, 2–6, 6–1

Details
- Draw: 32 (4 Q / 4 WC )

Events
Singles	Doubles
← 2012 ·	Dallas Tennis Classic	· 2014 →

Defending champion Frank Dancevic lost in qualifying for this year's tournament.
Jürgen Melzer defeated qualifier Denis Kudla 6–4, 2–6, 6–1 in the final to win the title.

== Seeds ==
1. (Cyprus) Marcos Baghdatis (first round, retired)
2. (Brazil) Thomaz Bellucci (first round)
3. (Uzbekistan) Denis Istomin (quarterfinals)
4. (Serbia) Viktor Troicki (second round)
5. (Austria) Jürgen Melzer (champion)
6. (Belgium) David Goffin (second round)
7. (Colombia) Alejandro Falla (second round)
8. (Czech Republic) Lukáš Rosol (first round)

== Draw ==
=== Key ===
- Q = Qualifier
- WC = Wild card
- LL = Lucky loser
- Alt = Alternate
- SE = Special exempt
- PR = Protected ranking
- ITF = ITF entry
- JE = Junior exempt
- w/o = Walkover
- r = Retired
- d = Defaulted
- SR = Special ranking

=== Finals ===
Semifinals
Q	(United States) Denis Kudla	7	6
WC	(Germany) Philipp Petzschner	5	4
5	(Austria) Jürgen Melzer	3	6	6
Q	(Ukraine) Illya Marchenko	6	4	4

Final
Q	(United States) Denis Kudla	4	6	1
5	(Austria) Jürgen Melzer	6	2	6

=== Top half ===
First round
1	(Cyprus) M Baghdatis	5	1^{r}
(Netherlands) I Sijsling	7	3
(Japan) T Ito	7	6^{4}	3
WC	(United States) B Reynolds	5	7^{7}	6
(Germany) M Bachinger	6	6
WC	(United States) A Kuznetsov	2	4
Q	(United States) D Kudla	6	4	7^{7}
8	(Czech Republic) L Rosol	3	6	6^{3}
4	(Serbia) V Troicki	6	6
(Germany) T Kamke	3	3
(Japan) G Soeda	7^{7}	5	3
WC	(Germany) P Petzschner	6^{2}	7	6
(Argentina) G Pella	4	4
Q	(Belgium) O Rochus	6	6
(Luxembourg) G Müller	4	5
7	(Colombia) A Falla	6	7

Second round
(Netherlands) I Sijsling	6^{5}	4
WC	(United States) B Reynolds	7^{7}	6
(Germany) M Bachinger	6	2	6^{4}
Q	(United States) D Kudla	0	6	7^{7}
4	(Serbia) V Troicki	4	4
WC	(Germany) P Petzschner	6	6
Q	(Belgium) O Rochus	6	6
7	(Colombia) A Falla	3	1

Quarterfinals
WC	(United States) B Reynolds	4	4
Q	(United States) D Kudla	6	6
WC	(Germany) P Petzschner	6	6
Q	(Belgium) O Rochus	2	2

Semifinals
Q	(United States) D Kudla	7	6
WC	(Germany) P Petzschner	5	4

=== Bottom half ===
First round
5	(Austria) J Melzer	4	7^{7}	6
(Czech Republic) J Hájek	6	6^{4}	1
WC	(United States) R Ginepri	6	6
(Germany) B Becker	4	4
(Italy) F Cipolla	5	0
(Slovakia) L Lacko	7	6
(United States) T Smyczek	6^{3}	6^{4}
3	(Uzbekistan) D Istomin	7^{7}	7^{7}
6	(Belgium) D Goffin	7	6
(United States) M Russell	5	4
Q	(Ukraine) I Marchenko	6	6
(France) G Rufin	3	3
Q	(Chinese Taipei) J Wang	5	0
(Belgium) S Darcis	7	6
(Ukraine) S Stakhovsky	6	6^{8}	6
2	(Brazil) T Bellucci	2	7^{10}	4

Second round
5	(Austria) J Melzer	6	6
WC	(United States) R Ginepri	0	4
(Slovakia) L Lacko	5	3
3	(Uzbekistan) D Istomin	7	6
6	(Belgium) D Goffin	6^{7}	3
Q	(Ukraine) I Marchenko	7^{9}	6
(Belgium) S Darcis	6^{5}	5
(Ukraine) S Stakhovsky	7^{7}	7

Quarterfinals
5	(Austria) J Melzer	6	3	7
3	(Uzbekistan) D Istomin	1	6	5
Q	(Ukraine) I Marchenko	6	3	7
(Ukraine) S Stakhovsky	3	6	5

Semifinals
5	(Austria) J Melzer	3	6	6
Q	(Ukraine) I Marchenko	6	4	4
