= 2012 Dallas Tennis Classic – Singles =

Singles
- 2012 Dallas Tennis Classic

Final
- Champion: (Canada) Frank Dancevic
- Runner-up: (Russia) Igor Andreev
- Score: 7–6^{(7–4)}, 6–3

Details
- Draw: 32 (4 Q / 4 WC )

Events
Singles	Doubles
Dallas Tennis Classic	· 2013 →

Frank Dancevic won first edition of the tournament by defeating Igor Andreev 7–6^{(7–4)}, 6–3 in the final.

== Seeds ==
1. (Croatia) Marin Čilić (quarterfinals)
2. (Russia) Alex Bogomolov Jr. (first round)
3. (Italy) Andreas Seppi (first round)
4. (Netherlands) Robin Haase (quarterfinals)
5. (Chinese Taipei) Lu Yen-Hsun (second round)
6. (Israel) Dudi Sela (second round, retired due to a left leg injury)
7. (Italy) Potito Starace (first round)
8. (Slovakia) Lukáš Lacko (quarterfinals)

== Draw ==
=== Key ===
- Q = Qualifier
- WC = Wild card
- LL = Lucky loser
- Alt = Alternate
- SE = Special exempt
- PR = Protected ranking
- ITF = ITF entry
- JE = Junior exempt
- w/o = Walkover
- r = Retired
- d = Defaulted
- SR = Special ranking

=== Finals ===
Semifinals
Q	(Canada) Frank Dancevic	w/o
WC	(Germany) Tommy Haas
(Germany) Björn Phau	6^{2}	6^{2}
(Russia) Igor Andreev	7^{7}	7^{7}

Final
Q	(Canada) Frank Dancevic	7^{7}	6
(Russia) Igor Andreev	6^{4}	3

=== Top half ===
First round
1	(Croatia) M Čilić	7	6
(Italy) S Bolelli	5	3
Q	(Germany) M Zverev	7^{7}	6^{2}	2
(Czech Republic) L Rosol	6^{0}	7^{7}	6
Q	(United States) A Kuznetsov	6^{2}	2
Q	(Canada) F Dancevic	7^{7}	6
WC	(Bosnia and Herzegovina) A Delić	3	4
5	(Chinese Taipei) Y-H Lu	6	6
3	(Italy) A Seppi	3	2
WC	(Germany) T Haas	6	6
(Netherlands) T Schoorel	3	4
(France) N Mahut	6	6
WC	(United States) John Nallon	0	0
(United States) M Russell	6	6
(Luxembourg) G Müller	6	7^{15}
7	(Italy) P Starace	4	6^{13}

Second round
1	(Croatia) M Čilić	6	7^{7}
(Czech Republic) L Rosol	0	6^{2}
Q	(Canada) F Dancevic	7^{7}	4	6
5	(Chinese Taipei) Y-H Lu	6^{3}	6	3
WC	(Germany) T Haas	6	6
(France) N Mahut	2	1
(United States) M Russell	3	4
(Luxembourg) G Müller	6	6

Quarterfinals
1	(Croatia) M Čilić	6^{5}	6^{5}
Q	(Canada) F Dancevic	7^{7}	7^{7}
WC	(Germany) T Haas	6	6
(Luxembourg) G Müller	4	4

Semifinals
Q	(Canada) F Dancevic	w/o
WC	(Germany) T Haas

=== Bottom half ===
First round
6	(Israel) D Sela	1	7	7
(United States) R Sweeting	6	5	5
(Turkey) M İlhan	6^{5}	2
(Germany) B Phau	7^{7}	6
(Argentina) L Mayer	6	6^{2}	6
Q	(Italy) T Fabbiano	3	7^{7}	4
(Germany) T Kamke	3	6^{4}
4	(Netherlands) R Haase	6	7^{7}
8	(Slovakia) L Lacko	6	6
(United States) B Reynolds	1	3
WC	(Germany) B Becker	7^{7}	6
(Russia) I Kunitsyn	6^{1}	3
(Russia) I Andreev	1	6	6
(Portugal) F Gil	6	3	3
(Italy) F Cipolla	6	6
2	(Russia) A Bogomolov	4	1

Second round
6	(Israel) D Sela	6^{5}	0^{r}
(Germany) B Phau	7^{7}	3
(Argentina) L Mayer	6^{6}	3
4	(Netherlands) R Haase	7^{8}	6
8	(Slovakia) L Lacko	6	6
WC	(Germany) B Becker	2	4
(Russia) I Andreev	6	6
(Italy) F Cipolla	2	0

Quarterfinals
(Germany) B Phau	6	7^{7}
4	(Netherlands) R Haase	4	6^{4}
8	(Slovakia) L Lacko	3	6	2
(Russia) I Andreev	6	3	6

Semifinals
(Germany) B Phau	6^{2}	6^{2}
(Russia) I Andreev	7^{7}	7^{7}
