= 2013 Dallas Tennis Classic =

- Date: 11–17 March
- Edition: 2nd
- Category: ATP Challenger Tour
- Draw: 32S/32Q/16D
- Prize money: $125,000+H
- Surface: Hard / Outdoor
- Location: Irving, Texas, United States

Champions

Singles
- (Austria) Jürgen Melzer

Doubles
- (Austria) Jürgen Melzer/ (Germany) Philipp Petzschner
← 2012 ·	Dallas Tennis Classic	· 2014 →

The 2013 Dallas Tennis Classic was a professional tennis tournament played on hard courts. It was the second edition of the tournament which was part of the 2013 ATP Challenger Tour. It took place in Irving, Texas, United States between 11 and 17 March 2013.

== Singles main-draw entrants ==
=== Seeds ===
Country	Player	Rank^{1}	Seed
CYP	Marcos Baghdatis	35	1
BRA	Thomaz Bellucci	38	2
UZB	Denis Istomin	43	3
SRB	Viktor Troicki	44	4
AUT	Jürgen Melzer	48	5
BEL	David Goffin	54	6
COL	Alejandro Falla	59	7
CZE	Lukáš Rosol	62	8

- ^{1} Rankings are as of March 4, 2013.

=== Other entrants ===
The following players received wildcards into the singles main draw:

- (United States) Robby Ginepri
- (United States) Alex Kuznetsov
- (Germany) Philipp Petzschner
- (United States) Bobby Reynolds

The following players received entry from the qualifying draw:

- (United States) Denis Kudla
- (Ukraine) Illya Marchenko
- (Belgium) Olivier Rochus
- (Chinese Taipei) Jimmy Wang

== Doubles main-draw entrants ==
=== Seeds ===
Country	Player	Country	Player	Rank^{1}	Seed
AUT	Jürgen Melzer	GER	Philipp Petzschner	70	1
USA	Eric Butorac	GBR	Dominic Inglot	90	2
FRA	Édouard Roger-Vasselin	NED	Igor Sijsling	108	3
SWE	Johan Brunström	RSA	Raven Klaasen	108	4

- ^{1} Rankings as of March 4, 2013.

=== Other entrants ===
The following pairs received wildcards into the doubles main draw:

- (Germany) Benjamin Becker / (Germany) Mischa Zverev
- (United States) Adham El-Effendi / (United Kingdom) Darren Walsh
- (United States) Alex Pier / (United States) Michael Russell

== Champions ==
=== Singles ===
- (Austria) Jürgen Melzer def. (United States) Denis Kudla, 6–4, 2–6, 6–1

=== Doubles ===
- (Austria) Jürgen Melzer / (Germany) Philipp Petzschner def. (United States) Eric Butorac / (United Kingdom) Dominic Inglot, 6–3, 6–1
