= 2012 Dallas Tennis Classic =

- Date: 12–18 March
- Edition: 1st
- Category: ATP Challenger Tour
- Draw: 32S/32Q/16D
- Prize money: $125,000+H
- Surface: Hard / Outdoor
- Location: Irving, Texas, United States

Champions

Singles
- (Canada) Frank Dancevic

Doubles
- (Mexico) Santiago González / (United States) Scott Lipsky
Dallas Tennis Classic	· 2013 →

The 2012 Dallas Tennis Classic was a professional tennis tournament played on hard courts. It was the first edition of the tournament, which was part of the 2012 ATP Challenger Tour. It took place in Irving, Texas, United States between 12 and 18 March 2012.

== Singles main-draw entrants ==
=== Seeds ===
Country	Player	Rank^{1}	Seed
CRO	Marin Čilić	24	1
RUS	Alex Bogomolov Jr.	37	2
ITA	Andreas Seppi	46	3
NED	Robin Haase	55	4
TPE	Lu Yen-hsun	56	5
ISR	Dudi Sela	63	6
ITA	Potito Starace	68	7
SVK	Lukáš Lacko	69	8

- ^{1} Rankings are as of March 5, 2012.

=== Other entrants ===
The following players received wildcards into the singles main draw:

- (Germany) Benjamin Becker
- (Bosnia and Herzegovina) Amer Delić
- (Germany) Tommy Haas
- (United States) John Nallon

The following players received entry from the qualifying draw:

- (Canada) Frank Dancevic
- (Italy) Thomas Fabbiano
- (United States) Alex Kuznetsov
- (Germany) Mischa Zverev

== Doubles main-draw entrants ==
=== Seeds ===
Country	Player	Country	Player	Rank^{1}	Seed
MEX	Santiago González	USA	Scott Lipsky	65	1
GER	Martin Emmrich	SWE	Andreas Siljeström	151	2
~~RUS~~	~~Alex Bogomolov Jr.~~	~~AUS~~	~~Jordan Kerr~~	~~171~~	~~3~~
CRO	Marin Čilić	USA	Nicholas Monroe	242	4

- ^{1} Rankings as of March 5, 2012.

=== Other entrants ===
The following pairs received wildcards into the doubles main draw:

- (Bosnia and Herzegovina) Amer Delić / (United States) Alex Pier
- (United States) Sasha Ermakov / (United States) Shane Vinsant
- (United States) Adham El-Effendi / (United Kingdom) Darren Walsh

The following pairs received entry as alternates into the doubles main draw:

- (Italy) Vincenzo Santopadre / (Italy) Potito Starace

== Champions ==
=== Singles ===
- (Canada) Frank Dancevic def. (Russia) Igor Andreev, 7–6^{(7–4)}, 6–3

=== Doubles ===
- (Mexico) Santiago González / (United States) Scott Lipsky def. (United States) Bobby Reynolds / (United States) Michael Russell, 6–4, 6–3
