= 2020 ABN AMRO World Tennis Tournament – Singles =

Singles
- 2020 ABN AMRO World Tennis Tournament

Final
- Champion: (France) Gaël Monfils
- Runner-up: (Canada) Félix Auger-Aliassime
- Score: 6–2, 6–4

Details
- Draw: 32 (4 Q / 3 WC )
- Seeds: 8

Events
Singles	Doubles
- ABN AMRO World Tennis Tournament

Defending champion Gaël Monfils defeated Félix Auger-Aliassime in the final, 6–2, 6–4 to win the singles tennis title at the 2020 Rotterdam Open.

== Seeds ==
1. (Russia) Daniil Medvedev (first round)
2. (Greece) Stefanos Tsitsipas (second round)
3. (France) Gaël Monfils (champion)
4. (Belgium) David Goffin (second round)
5. (Italy) Fabio Fognini (first round)
6. (Spain) Roberto Bautista Agut (second round)
7. (Russia) Andrey Rublev (quarterfinals)
8. (Canada) Denis Shapovalov (first round)

== Draw ==
Key

- Q = Qualifier
- WC = Wild card
- LL = Lucky loser
- Alt = Alternate
- ITF = ITF entry
- PR = Protected ranking
- SR = Special ranking
- SE = Special exempt
- JE = Junior exempt
- JR = Junior Accelerator Programme entrant
- CO = College Accelerator Programme entrant
- NG = Next Gen Accelerator Program entrant
- w/o = Walkover
- r = Retired
- d = Defaulted

=== Finals ===
Semifinals
(Serbia) Filip Krajinović	4	6^{5}
3	(France) Gaël Monfils	6	7^{7}
(Spain) Pablo Carreño Busta	6^{2}	4
(Canada) Félix Auger-Aliassime	7^{7}	6

Final
3	(France) Gaël Monfils	6	6
(Canada) Félix Auger-Aliassime	2	4

=== Top half ===
First round
1	(Russia) D Medvedev	4	3
SE	(Canada) V Pospisil	6	6
(Serbia) F Krajinović	6	6
WC	(Netherlands) T Griekspoor	4	1
(Kazakhstan) A Bublik	6	6^{2}	6
Q	(France) G Barrère	3	7^{7}	4
(Georgia (country)) N Basilashvili	2	3
7	(Russia) A Rublev	6	6
3	(France) G Monfils	6	6
(Portugal) J Sousa	3	2
(France) G Simon	7^{7}	3	6
Q	(Kazakhstan) M Kukushkin	6^{3}	6	3
(United Kingdom) D Evans	6	7
Q	(Germany) P Kohlschreiber	3	5
(Russia) K Khachanov	6	6
5	(Italy) F Fognini	3	3

Second round
SE	(Canada) V Pospisil	4	6^{7}
(Serbia) F Krajinović	6	7^{9}
(Kazakhstan) A Bublik	5	3
7	(Russia) A Rublev	7	6
3	(France) G Monfils	6	6
(France) G Simon	4	1
(United Kingdom) D Evans	4	6	6
(Russia) K Khachanov	6	3	4

Quarterfinals
(Serbia) F Krajinović	7^{7}	6
7	(Russia) A Rublev	6^{2}	4
3	(France) G Monfils	7^{7}	6
(United Kingdom) D Evans	6^{5}	2

Semifinals
(Serbia) F Krajinović	4	6^{5}
3	(France) G Monfils	6	7^{7}

=== Bottom half ===
First round
6	(Spain) R Bautista Agut	4	7^{7}	6
Q	(Hungary) M Fucsovics	6	6^{1}	1
(France) A Mannarino	5	7^{7}	4
(Spain) P Carreño Busta	7	6^{3}	6
WC	(Italy) J Sinner	w/o
(Moldova) R Albot
WC	(Netherlands) R Haase	6	6^{5}	4
4	(Belgium) D Goffin	3	7^{7}	6
8	(Canada) D Shapovalov	3	6^{3}
(Bulgaria) G Dimitrov	6	7^{7}
(Canada) F Auger-Aliassime	6	1	6
(Germany) J-L Struff	3	6	3
(Slovenia) A Bedene	6	6
(France) B Paire	2	4
(Poland) H Hurkacz	7^{7}	3	1
2	(Greece) S Tsitsipas	6^{2}	6	6

Second round
6	(Spain) R Bautista Agut	4	6	6^{4}
(Spain) P Carreño Busta	6	2	7^{7}
WC	(Italy) J Sinner	7^{9}	7
4	(Belgium) D Goffin	6^{7}	5
(Bulgaria) G Dimitrov	4	2
(Canada) F Auger-Aliassime	6	6
(Slovenia) A Bedene	7	6
2	(Greece) S Tsitsipas	5	4

Quarterfinals
(Spain) P Carreño Busta	7	3	7^{8}
WC	(Italy) J Sinner	5	6	6^{6}
(Canada) F Auger-Aliassime	6	7^{8}
(Slovenia) A Bedene	4	6^{6}

Semifinals
(Spain) P Carreño Busta	6^{2}	4
(Canada) F Auger-Aliassime	7^{7}	6

== Qualifying ==
=== Seeds ===
1. (Hungary) Márton Fucsovics (qualified)
2. (Kazakhstan) Mikhail Kukushkin (qualified)
3. (Germany) Philipp Kohlschreiber (qualified)
4. (France) Grégoire Barrère (qualified)
5. (Austria) Dennis Novak (first round)
6. (Australia) Alexei Popyrin (qualifying competition)
7. (Finland) Emil Ruusuvuori (qualifying competition)
8. (Germany) Yannick Maden (qualifying competition)

=== Qualifiers ===
1. (Hungary) Márton Fucsovics
2. (Kazakhstan) Mikhail Kukushkin
3. (Germany) Philipp Kohlschreiber
4. (France) Grégoire Barrère

=== Qualifying draw ===
==== First qualifier ====
First round				Qualifying competition
				1	(Hungary) Márton Fucsovics	6	6
				6	(Australia) Alexei Popyrin	2	1
WC	(Netherlands) Ryan Nijboer	2	4	6	(Australia) Alexei Popyrin	2	1
6	(Australia) Alexei Popyrin	6	6

==== Second qualifier ====
First round					Qualifying competition
					2	(Kazakhstan) Mikhail Kukushkin	6	7^{7}
					8	(Germany) Yannick Maden	1	6^{4}
Alt	(Netherlands) Miliaan Niesten	6	1	3	8	(Germany) Yannick Maden	1	6^{4}
8	(Germany) Yannick Maden	0	6	6

==== Third qualifier ====
First round
3	(Germany) Philipp Kohlschreiber	7	7^{7}
WC	(Netherlands) Jesper de Jong	5	6^{4}
(Ukraine) Sergiy Stakhovsky	7^{7}	6
5	(Austria) Dennis Novak	6^{5}	2

Qualifying competition
3	(Germany) Philipp Kohlschreiber	6	6
(Ukraine) Sergiy Stakhovsky	2	2

==== Fourth qualifier ====
First round
4	(France) Grégoire Barrère	6	7^{7}
WC	(Netherlands) Botic van de Zandschulp	4	6^{5}
(Canada) Steven Diez	6	3	5
7	(Finland) Emil Ruusuvuori	4	6	7

Qualifying competition
4	(France) Grégoire Barrère	7	7
7	(Finland) Emil Ruusuvuori	5	5
