= 2013 Dallas Tennis Classic – Doubles =

Doubles
- 2013 Dallas Tennis Classic

Final
- Champions: (Austria) Jürgen Melzer (Germany) Philipp Petzschner
- Runners-up: (United States) Eric Butorac (United Kingdom) Dominic Inglot
- Score: 6–3, 6–1

Events
Singles	Doubles
← 2012 ·	Dallas Tennis Classic	· 2014 →

Santiago González and Scott Lipsky were the defending champions but decided to compete in the 2013 BNP Paribas Open instead.
Jürgen Melzer and Philipp Petzschner defeated Eric Butorac and Dominic Inglot 6–3, 6–1 in the final to win the title.

== Seeds ==
1. (Austria) Jürgen Melzer / (Germany) Philipp Petzschner (champions)
2. (United States) Eric Butorac / (United Kingdom) Dominic Inglot (final)
3. (France) Édouard Roger-Vasselin / (Netherlands) Igor Sijsling (semifinals, withdrawn)
4. (Sweden) Johan Brunström / (South Africa) Raven Klaasen (semifinals)

== Draw ==
=== Key ===
- Q = Qualifier
- WC = Wild card
- LL = Lucky loser
- Alt = Alternate
- SE = Special exempt
- PR = Protected ranking
- ITF = ITF entry
- JE = Junior exempt
- w/o = Walkover
- r = Retired
- d = Defaulted
- SR = Special ranking

=== Draw ===
First round
1	(Austria) J Melzer (Germany) P Petzschner	6	6
WC	(United States) Alex Pier (United States) M Russell	2	4
WC	(Germany) B Becker (Germany) M Zverev	6	7^{7}
(Japan) T Ito (Japan) G Soeda	4	6^{0}
3	(France) É Roger-Vasselin (Netherlands) I Sijsling	7	6
(Belgium) S Darcis (Belgium) D Goffin	5	3
WC	(United States) Adham El-Effendi (United Kingdom) D Walsh	6	6
(Austria) O Marach (Brazil) A Sá	4	4
(Germany) P Marx (Romania) F Mergea	4	4
(Luxembourg) G Müller (Germany) S Stadler	6	6
(Brazil) T Bellucci (Argentina) G Pella	3	4
4	(Sweden) J Brunström (South Africa) R Klaasen	6	6
(United States) J Cerretani (Canada) A Shamasdin	3	6	[2]
(Germany) A Begemann (Germany) M Emmrich	6	4	[10]
(Czech Republic) J Hájek (Czech Republic) L Rosol	6^{2}	2
2	(United States) E Butorac (United Kingdom) D Inglot	7^{7}	6

Quarterfinals
1	(Austria) J Melzer (Germany) P Petzschner	4	6	[10]
WC	(Germany) B Becker (Germany) M Zverev	6	4	[8]
3	(France) É Roger-Vasselin (Netherlands) I Sijsling	6	6
WC	(United States) A El-Effendi (United Kingdom) D Walsh	4	3
(Luxembourg) G Müller (Germany) S Stadler	4	4
4	(Sweden) J Brunström (South Africa) R Klaasen	6	6
(Germany) A Begemann (Germany) M Emmrich	5	3
2	(United States) E Butorac (United Kingdom) D Inglot	7	6

Semifinals
1	(Austria) J Melzer (Germany) P Petzschner	w/o
3	(France) É Roger-Vasselin (Netherlands) I Sijsling
4	(Sweden) J Brunström (South Africa) R Klaasen	6	4	[4]
2	(United States) E Butorac (United Kingdom) D Inglot	4	6	[10]

Final
1	(Austria) J Melzer (Germany) P Petzschner	6	6
2	(United States) E Butorac (United Kingdom) D Inglot	3	1
