= 2015 Irving Tennis Classic – Singles =

Singles
- 2015 Irving Tennis Classic

Final
- Champion: (Slovenia) Aljaž Bedene
- Runner-up: (United States) Tim Smyczek
- Score: 7–6^{(7–3)}, 3–6, 6–3

Events
Singles	Doubles
- Irving Tennis Classic

Lukáš Rosol was the defending champion, however withdrew due to continuation playing in Indian Wells this year.

Aljaž Bedene won the title, defeating Tim Smyczek in the final, 7–6^{(7–3)}, 3–6, 6–3.

== Seeds ==
1. (France) Jérémy Chardy (second round)
2. (Luxembourg) Gilles Müller (semifinals)
3. (Germany) Benjamin Becker (quarterfinals)
4. (Austria) Dominic Thiem (second round)
5. (Ukraine) Sergiy Stakhovsky (second round)
6. (Poland) Jerzy Janowicz (second round)
7. (Cyprus) Marcos Baghdatis (quarterfinals)
8. (Argentina) Diego Schwartzman (second round)

== Draw ==
Key

- Q = Qualifier
- WC = Wild card
- LL = Lucky loser
- Alt = Alternate
- ITF = ITF entry
- PR = Protected ranking
- SR = Special ranking
- SE = Special exempt
- JE = Junior exempt
- JR = Junior Accelerator Programme entrant
- CO = College Accelerator Programme entrant
- NG = Next Gen Accelerator Program entrant
- w/o = Walkover
- r = Retired
- d = Defaulted

=== Finals ===
Semifinals
Q	(United Kingdom) Kyle Edmund	6^{1}	1
(Slovenia) Aljaž Bedene	7^{7}	6
(United States) Tim Smyczek	6	7^{10}
2	(Luxembourg) Gilles Müller	4	6^{8}

Final
(Slovenia) Aljaž Bedene	7^{7}	3	6
(United States) Tim Smyczek	6^{3}	6	3

=== Top half ===
First round
1/WC	(France) J Chardy	6	6
Q	(Italy) M Cecchinato	3	2
(Belgium) S Darcis	6	6
(United Kingdom) J Ward	4	4
Q	(United Kingdom) K Edmund	6	6
(Germany) T Kamke	4	4
(Portugal) G Elias	3	6	2
8	(Argentina) D Schwartzman	6	3	6
4	(Austria) D Thiem	6	1	6
(Israel) D Sela	3	6	3
(Slovenia) A Bedene	6	7
(United States) R Ram	3	5
(Australia) M Matosevic	6^{5}	6	6^{5}
(France) P-H Mathieu	7^{7}	1	7^{7}
(Germany) D Brown	6^{6}	6^{0}
7	(Cyprus) M Baghdatis	7^{8}	7^{7}

Second round
1/WC	(France) J Chardy	3	6	3
(Belgium) S Darcis	6	4	6
Q	(United Kingdom) K Edmund	3	6	6
8	(Argentina) D Schwartzman	6	3	1
4	(Austria) D Thiem	4	6	2
(Slovenia) A Bedene	6	3	6
(France) P-H Mathieu	6	6^{5}	1
7	(Cyprus) M Baghdatis	4	7^{7}	6

Quarterfinals
(Belgium) S Darcis	6^{5}	2
Q	(United Kingdom) K Edmund	7^{7}	6
(Slovenia) A Bedene	6	7^{7}
7	(Cyprus) M Baghdatis	3	6^{5}

Semifinals
Q	(United Kingdom) K Edmund	6^{1}	1
(Slovenia) A Bedene	7^{7}	6

=== Bottom half ===
First round
5/WC	(Ukraine) S Stakhovsky	6	6
(Brazil) T Bellucci	4	4
(Germany) J-L Struff	6^{3}	2
(United States) T Smyczek	7^{7}	6
Q	(Austria) Johannes Schretter	1	0
(Bosnia and Herzegovina) D Džumhur	6	6
(Uzbekistan) F Dustov	3	3
3	(Germany) B Becker	6	6
6	(Poland) J Janowicz	7^{7}	1	6
WC	(France) É Roger-Vasselin	6^{3}	6	2
(Germany) A Zverev	6	1	6
Q	(United States) B Fratangelo	4	6	1
(United States) D Kudla	6	6^{1}	6
WC	(United States) M Russell	4	7^{7}	4
(Spain) P Andújar	6^{2}	4
2	(Luxembourg) G Müller	7^{7}	6

Second round
5/WC	(Ukraine) S Stakhovsky	5	6	3
(United States) T Smyczek	7	0	6
(Bosnia and Herzegovina) D Džumhur	5	1
3	(Germany) B Becker	7	6
6	(Poland) J Janowicz	2	6^{3}
(Germany) A Zverev	6	7^{7}
(United States) D Kudla	4	0
2	(Luxembourg) G Müller	6	6

Quarterfinals
(United States) T Smyczek	6	6
3	(Germany) B Becker	2	3
(Germany) A Zverev	2	6	4
2	(Luxembourg) G Müller	6	3	6

Semifinals
(United States) T Smyczek	6	7^{10}
2	(Luxembourg) G Müller	4	6^{8}
