= 2015 Irving Tennis Classic =

- Date: 17 – 22 March
- Edition: 4th
- Draw: 32S / 16D
- Prize money: $125,000+H
- Surface: Hard
- Location: Irving, United States

Champions

Singles
- (Slovenia) Aljaž Bedene

Doubles
- (Sweden) Robert Lindstedt / (Ukraine) Sergiy Stakhovsky
- Irving Tennis Classic

The 2015 Irving Tennis Classic was a professional tennis tournament played on hard courts. It was the fourth edition of the tournament which was part of the 2015 ATP Challenger Tour. It took place in Irving, United States between 17 and 22 March 2015.

== Singles main draw entrants ==
=== Seeds ===
Country	Player	Rank^{1}	Seed
FRA	Jérémy Chardy	34	1
LUX	Gilles Müller	36	2
GER	Benjamin Becker	40	3
AUT	Dominic Thiem	46	4
UKR	Sergiy Stakhovsky	50	5
POL	Jerzy Janowicz	51	6
CYP	Marcos Baghdatis	61	7
ARG	Diego Schwartzman	63	8

- ^{1} Rankings as of March 9, 2015

=== Other entrants ===
The following players received wildcards into the singles main draw:

- (France) Jérémy Chardy
- (Ukraine) Sergiy Stakhovsky
- (France) Édouard Roger-Vasselin
- (United States) Michael Russell

The following players received entry from the qualifying draw:

- (United States) Bjorn Fratangelo
- (Italy) Marco Cecchinato
- (United Kingdom) Kyle Edmund
- (Austria) Johannes Schretter

== Champions ==
=== Singles ===
- (Slovenia) Aljaž Bedene def. (United States) Tim Smyczek, 7–6^{(7–3)}, 3–6, 6–3

=== Doubles ===
- (Sweden) Robert Lindstedt / (Ukraine) Sergiy Stakhovsky def. (Germany) Benjamin Becker / (Germany) Philipp Petzschner, 6–4, 6–4
