= Mikhail Kukushkin =

Kazakhstani tennis player

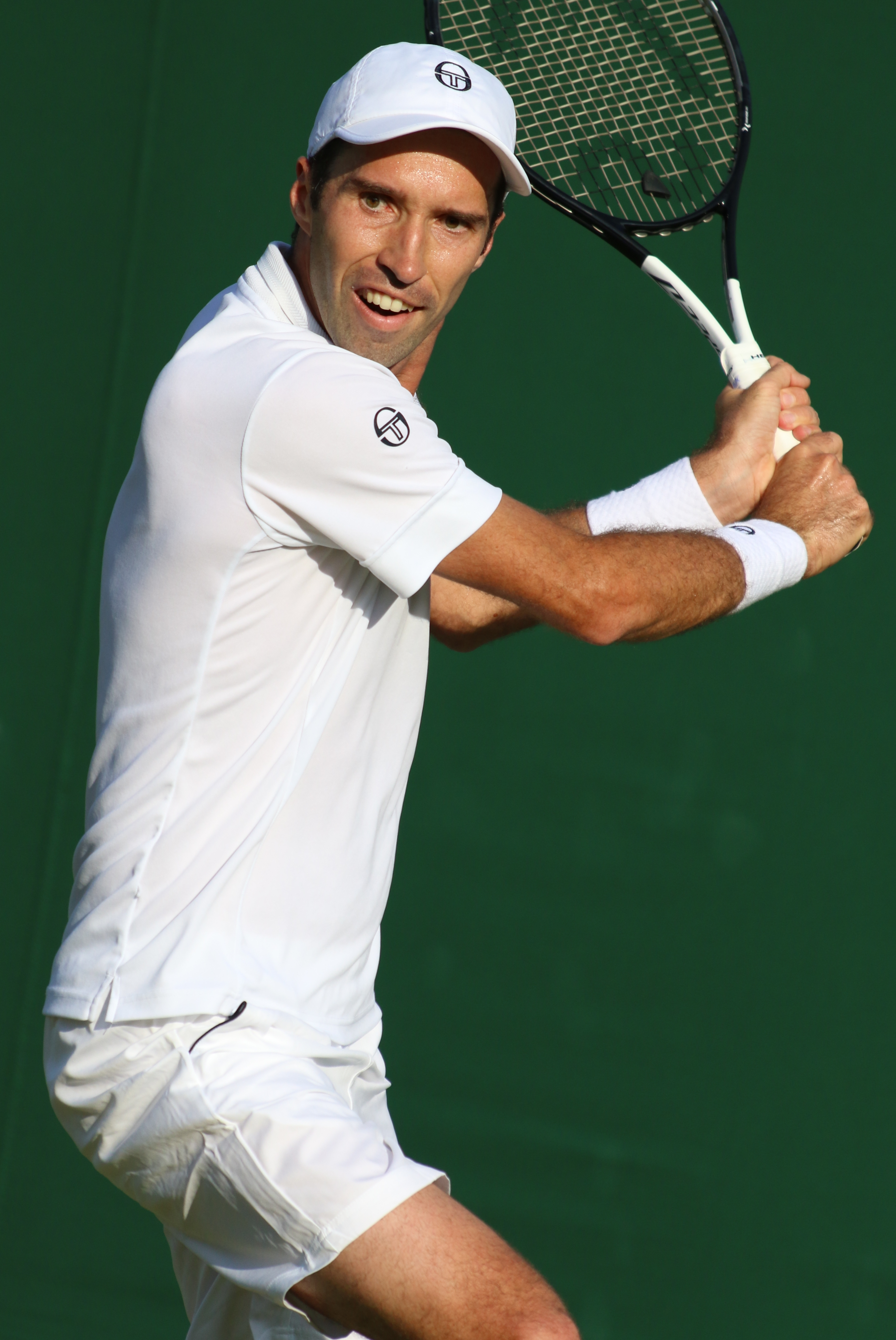
- Kukushkin at the 2019 Wimbledon Championships
- Country (sports): Russia (2006–2008); Kazakhstan (2008 – )
- Residence: Astana, Kazakhstan
- Born: 26 December 1987 (age 38) Volgograd, Russian SFSR, Soviet Union
- Height: 1.83 m (6 ft 0 in)
- Turned pro: 2006
- Retired: 21 October 2026
- Plays: Right-handed (two-handed backhand)
- Coach: Anastasia Kukushkina (2008–2018)
- Prize money: US $7,566,992

Singles
- Career record: 176–240
- Career titles: 1
- Highest ranking: No. 39 (25 February 2019)
- Current ranking: No. 336 (31 August 2026)

Grand Slam singles results
- Australian Open: 4R (2012)
- French Open: 2R (2011, 2012, 2014, 2017, 2020)
- Wimbledon: 4R (2019)
- US Open: 3R (2013, 2015, 2017, 2018, 2020)

Doubles
- Career record: 36–72
- Career titles: 0
- Highest ranking: No. 67 (2 March 2020)

Grand Slam doubles results
- Australian Open: SF (2020)
- French Open: QF (2019)
- Wimbledon: 2R (2011, 2012, 2014, 2019)
- US Open: 3R (2014)

Team competitions
- Davis Cup: QF (2011, 2013, 2014, 2021)
Medal record
Representing Kazakhstan
Men's tennis
Asian Games
Gold medal – first place	2014 Incheon	Team event
- Last updated on: 1 September 2026.

Mikhail Aleksandrovich Kukushkin (Russian: Михаил Александрович Кукушкин; born 26 December 1987) is a Russian-born Kazakhstani former professional tennis player. He has a career-high ATP singles ranking of world No. 39 achieved on 25 February 2019 and a doubles ranking of No. 67 achieved on 2 March 2020.

== Career ==
=== 2006–10: Turned pro, Masters debut, maiden ATP Tour title ===
He turned pro in 2006. Before 2008, he played for his country of birth, Russia.

In 2009, he came through qualifying to reach the main draw of a Masters Series 1000 tournament for the first time at the Miami Masters. He beat Tommy Haas in the first round, but lost to Dmitry Tursunov in the second round.

In September 2010, during the Davis Cup play-offs, he notably beat Swiss player Stanislas Wawrinka. His good form continued, later winning his only ATP World Tour title, as he beat world number 10 player Mikhail Youzhny in the final of the St. Petersburg Open 6–3, 7–6.

=== 2012–13: Historic fourth round at the Australian Open, Olympics & top 50 debuts ===
In January 2012, Kukushkin became the first player from Kazakhstan to reach the fourth round of the 2012 Australian Open, after defeating Guillermo García-López, Viktor Troicki and Gaël Monfils.

Later that season, he reached a then career-high singles ranking of World No. 49 on 11 June 2012, just after the quarterfinals at Nice and the second round at the 2012 French Open.

At the 2012 Olympics, he lost in the first round of the men's singles to Gilles Simon. By the end of 2012 he suffered from a bad hip injury and had to go for surgery twice.

By August 2013, his ranking had tumbled to No. 430. After making his recovery he reached the third round of the 2013 US Open, his best performance at the Grand Slam starting from the qualifying draw.

In September 2013, he found good form again, winning two Challenger Tournaments in Turkey: Izmir and Istanbul. He then reached his second ATP World Tour final in Moscow, at the Kremlin Cup, beating in the semifinals World No. 22 and defending champion Andreas Seppi.

=== 2014–15: Wimbledon third round ===
In the 2014 Wimbledon Championships, he reached the third round where he lost in four sets to world No. 1 Rafael Nadal 7–6^{(7–4)}, 1–6, 1–6, 1–6. As a result of his run he reached a new career high of No. 48 on 21 July 2014.

At the 2014 Kremlin Cup he defeated Fabio Fognini and Mikhail Youzhny to reach the semifinals, where he lost to Marin Čilić. At the 2014 Swiss Indoors, he won over world No. 4 Stanislas Wawrinka in the first round. At the 2014 Shanghai Rolex Masters he defeated Kevin Anderson to reach the third round, where he fell to world No. 1 Novak Djokovic in three sets. At the 2015 US Open, Kukushkin defeated 17th seed Grigor Dimitrov in five sets to reach the third round.

=== 2019–20: Top 40, Wimbledon fourth round, ATP quarterfinal ===
Kukushkin started his 2019 season at the Australian Open. He lost in the first round to 28th seed, world No. 31, and eventual semifinalist, Lucas Pouille.

After the Australian Open, Kukushkin represented Kazakhstan during the Davis Cup tie against Portugal. He won both of his matches beating Pedro Sousa and João Sousa. In the end, Kazakhstan won the tie over Portugal 3–1 to advance to the Davis Cup Finals. At the Sofia Open, he lost in the second round to seventh seed Gaël Monfils. In Rotterdam, he was defeated in the second round by Damir Džumhur. As a result, he reached a new career-high ranking of No. 39 on 25 February 2019.

At the 2019 Wimbledon Championships Kukushkin reached the fourth round for the first time at this Grand Slam and for the second time in his career at this level.

Kukushkin started his 2020 season at the Qatar ExxonMobil Open. He lost in the second round to second seed, world No. 23, and eventual champion, Andrey Rublev. At the 2020 Australian Open, he was defeated in the first round by Australian wildcard, Marc Polmans, in five sets.

Getting past qualifying at the 2020 Rotterdam Open, Kukushkin lost in the first round to Gilles Simon. Last year finalist at the 2020 Open 13 Provence, he was defeated in the first round by Pierre-Hugues Herbert. Due to not defending his finalist points from last year, his ranking fell from 69 to 89. In Dubai, he lost in the first round to seventh seed and world No. 17, Karen Khachanov. Representing Kazakhstan during the 2020 Davis Cup tie against the Netherlands, he lost his match to Robin Haase. In the end, Kazakhstan won the tie over the Netherlands 3–1 to advance to the Davis Cup Finals in Madrid. The ATP tour canceled tournaments from March through July due to the COVID-19 pandemic.

When the ATP resumed tournament play in August, Kukushkin competed at the 2020 Western & Southern Open. He lost in the first round of qualifying to Cameron Norrie. At the US Open, he knocked out 13th seed and world No. 19, Cristian Garín, in the second round in five sets. He was defeated in the third round by Jordan Thompson.

After the US Open, Kukushkin played at the 2020 Italian Open. Here, he fell in the final round of qualifying to Dominik Koepfer. At the French Open, he upset 14th seed, world No. 15, and 2011 quarterfinalist, Fabio Fognini, in the first round. He lost in the second round to Spanish qualifier Pedro Martínez.

At the 2020 St. Petersburg Open, Kukushkin lost in the first round to Miomir Kecmanović. He played his final tournament of the 2020 season at the first edition of the Astana Open. He beat top seed and world No. 28, Benoît Paire, in the second round. He was defeated in the quarterfinals by qualifier Emil Ruusuvuori.

Kukushkin ended the 2020 season ranked No. 89.

=== 2021–23: Three Challenger finals ===
Kukushkin started his 2021 season at the Murray River Open. He lost in the second round to top seed and world No. 18, Stan Wawrinka. At the 2021 Australian Open, he was defeated in the first round by third seed and last year finalist, Dominic Thiem. As the top seed at the 2021 Nur-Sultan Challenger, Kukushkin lost in the first round to eventual champion Mackenzie McDonald. Seeded third at the Nur-Sultan Challenger II, he was beaten in the first round by Frederico Ferreira Silva.

Kukushkin started his 2022 season at the Traralgon International. Seeded eighth, he reached the quarterfinals where he lost to fourth seed and eventual champion, Tomáš Macháč. Getting past qualifying at the Australian Open, he was defeated in the first round by Tommy Paul. At the 2022 Open Sud de France, Kukushkin lost in the final round of qualifying to Pierre-Hugues Herbert. In Cherbourg, he was defeated in the second round by eventual finalist Constant Lestienne. Making it past the qualifying rounds at the 2022 Open 13 Provence, he lost in the first round to Pierre-Hugues Herbert. At the Teréga Open Pau–Pyrénées, he was defeated in the second round by Manuel Guinard. Representing Kazakhstan in the Davis Cup tie against Norway, he lost to Casper Ruud. In the end, Kazakhstan won the tie over Norway 3–1 to advance to the Davis Cup Finals. Getting past qualifying in Indian Wells, he lost in the first round to Tommy Paul. Playing as a qualifier at the 2022 Arizona Classic, a tournament where he reached the final when it was last held in 2019, he was defeated in the first round by Richard Gasquet. Getting past qualifying in Miami, he got his first ATP win of the season by beating Botic van de Zandschulp in the first round. He lost in the second round to 11th seed, world No. 13, and Indian Wells Champion, Taylor Fritz.

Starting his clay court season at the 2022 Serbia Open where he received a wildcard, Kukushkin lost in the first round to Aljaž Bedene. In Munich, he fell in the first round of qualifying to Thiago Monteiro. He started his grass court season at the 2022 Surbiton Trophy. He lost in the first round to British wildcard Paul Jubb. In Nottingham, he reached the quarterfinals where he was defeated by third seed and eventual finalist, Jordan Thompson. At the 2022 Ilkley Trophy, he retired from his first-round match against Fernando Verdasco due to injury. Making it past qualifying for Wimbledon, he lost in the first round to 29th seed and world No. 34, Jenson Brooksby. In August 2022, Mikhail Kukushkin won his first match at the Challenger in Chicago as an alternate where he defeated the American Govind Nanda. In October, he received a wildcard for his home tournament, the 2022 Astana Open. In November, he reached the Challenger final in Andria where he lost to Leandro Riedi.

He finished the 2022 season ranked No. 223 on 21 November 2022, his lowest ranking in 15 years.

Kukushkin started his 2023 season at the Canberra International. He lost in the first round of qualifying to Australian Tristan Schoolkate. At the Australian Open, he fell in the second round of qualifying to Yosuke Watanuki. At the Concepción Challenger, Kukushkin lost in the first round to sixth seed Hugo Dellien. In Tenerife, he was defeated in the first round by Alessandro Giannessi. In March 2023, he played at the Challenger Città di Lugano. He lost in the first round to fifth seed Liam Broady. At the Challenger Biel/Bienne, he was eliminated in the second round by third seed Norbert Gombos. At the Play In Challenger, he lost in the first round to French qualifier Kenny de Schepper. In September 2023, he received a wildcard for his home tournament, the 2023 Astana Open.

Kukushkin ended the 2023 season ranked No. 264.

=== 2024–26: ATP quarterfinal in 4 years, out of top 300, retirement ===
In May 2024, he qualified for the French Open, his 11th appearance at this Major.

Kukushkin broke a six-year title drought on the ATP Challenger Tour early in the first quarter of the season, capturing titles in Manama and Tenerife. At the Hangzhou Open Kukushkin reached his first ATP Tour quarterfinal in four years (since Nur-Sultan, Kazakhstan in 2020). As a result he returned to the top 100 in the singles rankings after more than three years (since 17 May 2021), on 23 September 2024.

In June 2026, Kukushkin announced his retirement from professional tennis, with his final appearance at the Almaty Open. He beat Stefanos Sakellaridis in the first round, but lost to Stefanos Tsitsipas in his final match.

== Performance timelines ==
Key
W	F	SF	QF	#R	RR	Q#	P#	DNQ	A	Z#	PO	G	S	B	NMS	NTI	P	NH

(W) winner; (F) finalist; (SF) semifinalist; (QF) quarterfinalist; (#R) rounds 4, 3, 2, 1; (RR) round-robin stage; (Q#) qualification round; (P#) preliminary round; (DNQ) did not qualify; (A) absent; (Z#) Davis/Fed Cup Zonal Group (with number indication) or (PO) play-off; (G) gold, (S) silver or (B) bronze Olympic/Paralympic medal; (NMS) not a Masters tournament; (NTI) not a Tier I tournament; (P) postponed; (NH) not held; (SR) strike rate (events won / competed); (W–L) win–loss record.
To avoid confusion and double counting, these charts are updated at the conclusion of a tournament or when the player's participation has ended.

=== Singles ===
Current through the 2026 Rolex Paris Masters.

Tournament	2007	2008	2009	2010	2011	2012	2013	2014	2015	2016	2017	2018	2019	2020	2021	2022	2023	2024	2025	2026	SR	W–L	Win%
Grand Slam tournaments
Australian Open	A	A	A	A	1R	4R	1R	1R	1R	1R	1R	1R	1R	1R	1R	1R	Q2	A	Q1	A	0 / 12	3–12	20%
French Open	A	Q2	Q2	Q2	2R	2R	Q2	2R	1R	1R	2R	1R	1R	2R	1R	A	A	1R	Q1	A	0 / 11	5–11	31%
Wimbledon	A	Q1	A	A	1R	1R	A	3R	1R	2R	2R	2R	4R	NH	1R	1R	A	Q3	Q2	A	0 / 10	8–9	47%
US Open	A	A	Q3	1R	2R	1R	3R	1R	3R	1R	3R	3R	2R	3R	1R	Q2	Q2	Q1	Q2	A	0 / 12	12–12	50%
Win–loss	0–0	0–0	0–0	0–1	2–4	4–4	2–2	3–4	2–4	1–3	4–4	3–4	4–4	3–3	0–4	0–2	0–0	0–1	0–0	0–0	0 / 45	28–44	39%
ATP Masters 1000
Indian Wells Masters	A	A	A	A	1R	A	A	3R	1R	2R	2R	1R	1R	NH	Q2	1R	A	A	Q2	A	0 / 8	4–8	33%
Miami Masters	A	A	2R	A	2R	1R	A	1R	2R	3R	2R	1R	1R	NH	2R	2R	A	Q1	Q1	A	0 / 11	8–11	42%
Monte-Carlo Masters	A	A	A	A	Q1	3R	A	Q1	1R	Q1	Q1	Q1	2R	NH	A	A	A	A	A	A	0 / 3	3–3	50%
Madrid Masters	A	A	A	A	A	A	A	A	A	Q2	1R	2R	1R	NH	Q1	A	A	Q1	A	A	0 / 3	1–3	25%
Rome Masters	A	A	A	A	A	Q2	A	2R	Q1	2R	Q1	Q1	1R	Q3	Q1	A	A	Q2	A	A	0 / 3	2–3	40%
Canada Masters	A	A	A	A	A	2R	A	A	A	A	A	A	1R	NH	A	A	A	A	A	A	0 / 2	1–2	33%
Cincinnati Masters	A	A	A	A	Q2	A	A	A	Q1	A	A	A	2R	Q1	A	A	A	A	Q1	A	0 / 1	0–1	0%
Shanghai Masters	A	A	A	A	1R	A	A	3R	A	Q1	A	2R	2R	NH			2R	Q1	A	A	0 / 5	5–5	50%
Paris Masters	A	A	A	A	A	A	A	A	A	A	Q1	2R	A	A	A	A	A	A	A	A	0 / 1	1–1	50%
Win–loss	0–0	0–0	1–1	0–0	1–3	3–3	0–0	5–4	1–3	4–3	2–3	3–5	2–8	0–0	1–1	1–2	1–1	0–0	1–1	0–0	0 / 37	25–37	40%
Career statistics
	2007	2008	2009	2010	2011	2012	2013	2014	2015	2016	2017	2018	2019	2020	2021	2022	2023	2024	2025	2026	SR	W–L	Win%
Tournaments	1	4	6	9	20	14	5	24	23	20	14	21	25	9	12	7	2	3	2	1	total: 222		
Titles	0	0	0	1	0	0	0	0	0	0	0	0	0	0	0	0	0	0	0	0	total: 1		
Finals	0	0	0	1	0	0	1	0	1	0	0	0	1	0	0	0	0	0	0	0	total: 4		
Overall win–loss	0–1	4–4	7–7	17–8	10–24	12–15	6–6	16–27	19–24	13–21	13–14	21–22	22–26	6–10	4–13	1–10	1–2	2–3	0–2	1–1	1 / 222	176–240	42%
Year-end ranking	218	148	132	59	91	107	67	70	65	89	74	53	67	89	183	223	264	112	294		$8,199,591		

=== Doubles ===
Tournament	2008	2009	2010	2011	2012	2013	2014	2015	2016	2017	2018	2019	2020	2021	2022	W–L
Grand Slam tournaments
Australian Open	A	A	A	1R	1R	A	1R	1R	1R	A	1R	1R	SF	2R	A	5–9
French Open	A	A	A	3R	1R	A	2R	1R	A	A	A	QF	1R	A	A	6–6
Wimbledon	Q1	A	A	2R	2R	A	2R	1R	A	A	A	2R	NH	A	A	4–5
US Open	A	A	A	2R	1R	A	3R	1R	A	A	A	1R	A	A	A	3–4
Win–loss	0–0	0–0	0–0	4–4	1–3	0–0	4–4	0–4	0–1	0–0	0–1	4–3	4–2	1–1	0–0	18–23

== ATP Tour finals ==
=== Singles: 4 (1 title, 3 runners-up) ===
Legend Grand Slam ATP Masters 1000 ATP 500 Series ATP 250 Series (1–3)	Finals by surface Hard (1–3) Clay (0–0) Grass (0–0)	Finals by setting Outdoor (0–1) Indoor (1–2)

Result	W–L	Date	Tournament	Tier	Surface	Opponent	Score
Win	1–0	Oct 2010	St. Petersburg Open, Russia	250 Series	Hard (i)	(Russia) Mikhail Youzhny	6–3, 7–6^{(7–2)}
Loss	1–1	Oct 2013	Kremlin Cup, Russia	250 Series	Hard (i)	(France) Richard Gasquet	6–4, 4–6, 4–6
Loss	1–2	Jan 2015	Sydney International, Australia	250 Series	Hard	(Serbia) Viktor Troicki	2–6, 3–6
Loss	1–3	Feb 2019	Open 13, France	250 Series	Hard (i)	(Greece) Stefanos Tsitsipas	5–7, 6–7^{(5–7)}

== ATP Challenger and ITF Tour finals ==
=== Singles: 31 (17 titles, 14 runner–ups) ===
Legend (singles) ATP Challenger Tour (16–12) ITF Futures Tour (1–2)	Titles by surface Hard (9–12) Clay (7–2) Carpet (1–0)

Result	W–L	Date	Tournament	Tier	Surface	Opponent	Score
Loss	0–1	Nov 2006	Russia F2, Moscow	Futures	Hard (i)	(Russia) Evgeny Kirillov	6–3, 1–6, 3–6
Win	1–1	Aug 2007	Saransk, Russia	Challenger	Clay	(Ukraine) Ivan Sergeyev	6–3, 6–1
Win	2–1	Aug 2007	Samarkand, Uzbekistan	Challenger	Clay	(Italy) Manuel Jorquera	6–4, 6–3
Loss	2–2	Aug 2007	Russia F3, Moscow	Futures	Clay	(Russia) Mikhail Elgin	6–7^{(5–7)}, 6–7^{(5–7)}
Win	3–2	Mar 2008	Barletta, Italy	Challenger	Clay	(Serbia) Boris Pashanski	6–3, 6–4
Win	4–2	Apr 2008	Russia F1, Moscow	Futures	Carpet (i)	(Czech Republic) Jan Mertl	6–7^{(4–7)}, 7–6^{(7–4)}, 6–3
Win	5–2	Jul 2009	Penza, Russia	Challenger	Hard	(Ukraine) Illya Marchenko	6–4, 6–2
Win	6–2	Jul 2010	Braunschweig, Germany	Challenger	Clay	(Brazil) Marcos Daniel	6–2, 3–0 ret.
Win	7–2	Jul 2010	Penza, Russia	Challenger	Hard	(Russia) Konstantin Kravchuk	6–3, 6–7^{(3–7)}, 6–3
Loss	7–3	Aug 2010	Istanbul, Turkey	Challenger	Hard	(France) Adrian Mannarino	4–6, 6–3, 3–6
Loss	7–4	Jul 2011	Penza, Russia	Challenger	Hard	(Spain) Arnau Brugués Davi	6–4, 3–6, 2–6
Win	8–4	Jul 2011	Astana, Kazakhstan	Challenger	Hard (i)	(Ukraine) Sergei Bubka	6–3, 6–4
Win	9–4	Jun 2013	Košice, Slovakia	Challenger	Clay	(Bosnia and Herzegovina) Damir Džumhur	6–4, 1–6, 6–2
Loss	9–5	Jun 2013	Tanger, Morocco	Challenger	Clay	(Spain) Pablo Carreño Busta	2–6, 1–4 ret.
Loss	9–6	Jul 2013	Astana, Kazakhstan	Challenger	Hard (i)	(Israel) Dudi Sela	7–5, 2–6, 6–7^{(6–8)}
Win	10–6	Sep 2013	Istanbul, Turkey	Challenger	Hard	(Ukraine) Illya Marchenko	6–3, 6–3
Win	11–6	Sep 2013	İzmir, Turkey	Challenger	Hard	(Republic of Ireland) Louk Sorensen	6–1, 6–4
Loss	11–7	Aug 2014	Aptos, USA	Challenger	Hard	(Cyprus) Marcos Baghdatis	6–7^{(7–9)}, 4–6
Win	12–7	Aug 2015	Astana, Kazakhstan	Challenger	Hard	(Russia) Evgeny Donskoy	6–2, 6–2
Win	13–7	Jun 2016	Prostějov, Czech Republic	Challenger	Clay	(Hungary) Márton Fucsovics	6–1, 6–2
Win	14–7	Jun 2016	Moscow, Russia	Challenger	Clay	(Canada) Steven Diez	6–3, 6–3
Loss	14–8	Mar 2017	Irving, USA	Challenger	Hard	(United Kingdom) Aljaž Bedene	4–6, 6–3, 1–6
Loss	14–9	Jul 2017	Astana, Kazakhstan	Challenger	Hard	(Belarus) Egor Gerasimov	6–7^{(9–11)}, 6–4, 4–6
Win	15–9	Mar 2018	Irving, USA	Challenger	Hard	(Italy) Matteo Berrettini	6–2, 3–6, 6–1
Loss	15–10	Mar 2019	Phoenix, USA	Challenger	Hard	(Italy) Matteo Berrettini	6–3, 6–7^{(6–8)}, 6–7^{(2–7)}
Loss	15–11	Nov 2022	Andria, Italy	Challenger	Hard (i)	(Switzerland) Leandro Riedi	6–7^{(4–7)}, 3–6
Loss	15–12	Jun 2023	Tyler, USA	Challenger	Hard	(United States) Nicolas Moreno de Alboran	7–6^{(10–8)}, 6–7^{(0–7)}, 4–6
Loss	15–13	Jul 2023	Bloomfield Hills, USA	Challenger	Hard	(United States) Steve Johnson	4–6, 7–6^{(9–7)}, 6–7^{(4–7)}
Win	16–13	Feb 2024	Manama, Bahrain	Challenger	Hard	(France) Richard Gasquet	7–6^{(7–5)}, 6–4
Win	17–13	Mar 2024	Tenerife, Spain	Challenger	Hard	(Italy) Matteo Gigante	6–2, 2–0 ret.
Loss	17–14	Jan 2026	Glasgow, UK	Challenger	Hard (i)	(France) Clément Chidekh	7–5, 1–6, 0–4 ret.

=== Doubles: 3 (1 title, 2 runner–ups) ===
Legend (doubles) ATP Challenger Tour (0–1) ITF Futures Tour (1–1)	Titles by surface Hard (0–2) Clay (1–0) Grass (0–0) Carpet (0–0)

Result	W–L	Date	Tournament	Tier	Surface	Partner	Opponents	Score
Loss	0–1	May 2006	Uzbekistan F3, Namangan	Futures	Hard	(Ukraine) Oleksandr Nedovyesov	(France) Jean-François Bachelot (France) Nicolas Tourte	5–7, 3–6
Win	1–1	May 2007	Italy F13, Vicenza	Futures	Clay	(Italy) Riccardo Ghedin	(Argentina) Guillermo Carry (Slovenia) Andrej Kračman	7–6^{(7–2)}, 6–7^{(5–7)}, 7–6^{(7–5)}
Loss	1–2	Jul 2013	Astana, Kazakhstan	Challenger	Hard (i)	(Kazakhstan) Andrey Golubev	(Italy) Claudio Grassi (Italy) Riccardo Ghedin	6–3, 3–6, [8–10]

== Record against other players ==
=== Record against top 10 players ===
Kukushkin's match record against those who have been ranked in the top 10, with those who have been No. 1 in bold (ATP World Tour, Grand Slam and Davis Cup main draw matches).

- (Italy) Fabio Fognini 3–2
- (Russia) Andrey Rublev 3–2
- (Russia) Mikhail Youzhny 3–2
- (Bulgaria) Grigor Dimitrov 2–1
- (Switzerland) Stan Wawrinka 2–3
- (Spain) David Ferrer 2–7
- (Latvia) Ernests Gulbis 1–0
- (Canada) Denis Shapovalov 1–0
- (Italy) Jannik Sinner 1–0
- (United States) James Blake 1–1
- (Argentina) Juan Martín del Potro 1–1
- (Germany) Tommy Haas 1–1
- (Russia) Karen Khachanov 1–1
- (Spain) Tommy Robredo 1–1
- (Serbia) Janko Tipsarević 1–1
- (France) Gaël Monfils 1–2
- (Argentina) Diego Schwartzman 1–2
- (Spain) Roberto Bautista Agut 1–3
- (Croatia) Marin Čilić 1–3
- (South Africa) Kevin Anderson 1–4
- (United States) John Isner 1–4
- (Italy) Matteo Berrettini 0–1
- (France) Arnaud Clément 0–1
- (Russia) Nikolay Davydenko 0–1
- (Croatia) Ivan Ljubičić 0–1
- (Argentina) Juan Mónaco 0–1
- (Canada) Milos Raonic 0–1
- (Austria) Dominic Thiem 0–1
- (Germany) Alexander Zverev 0–1
- (Czech Republic) Tomáš Berdych 0–2
- (Spain) Pablo Carreño Busta 0–2
- (Serbia) **Novak Djokovic 0–2**
- (Spain) **Juan Carlos Ferrero 0–2**
- (Belgium) David Goffin 0–2
- (Russia) Daniil Medvedev 0–2
- (Czech Republic) Radek Štěpánek 0–2
- (Switzerland) **Roger Federer 0–3**
- (France) Richard Gasquet 0–3
- (France) Lucas Pouille 0–3
- (Greece) Stefanos Tsitsipas 0–3
- (United Kingdom) **Andy Murray 0–4**
- (Spain) **Rafael Nadal 0–4**
- (France) Gilles Simon 0–4
- (Japan) Kei Nishikori 0–10

* As of 27 August 2021

=== Top 10 wins ===
- He has a 4–37 record against players who were, at the time the match was played, ranked in the top 10.

Season	2010	...	2014	...	2018	2019	Total
Wins	1		1		1	1	**4**

#	Player	Rank	Event	Surface	Rd	Score
**2010**
1.	(Russia) Mikhail Youzhny	9	St. Petersburg Open, Russia	Hard (i)	F	6–3, 7–6^{(7–2)}
**2014**
2.	(Switzerland) Stanislas Wawrinka	4	Swiss Indoors, Switzerland	Hard (i)	1R	6–4, 6–7^{(1–7)}, 6–3
**2018**
3.	(Bulgaria) Grigor Dimitrov	10	Vienna Open, Austria	Hard (i)	1R	6–4, 4–6, 6–4
**2019**
4.	(Spain) Roberto Bautista Agut	10	US Open, United States	Hard	1R	3–6, 6–1, 6–4, 3–6, 6–3
