= Aljaž Bedene =

Slovenian tennis player

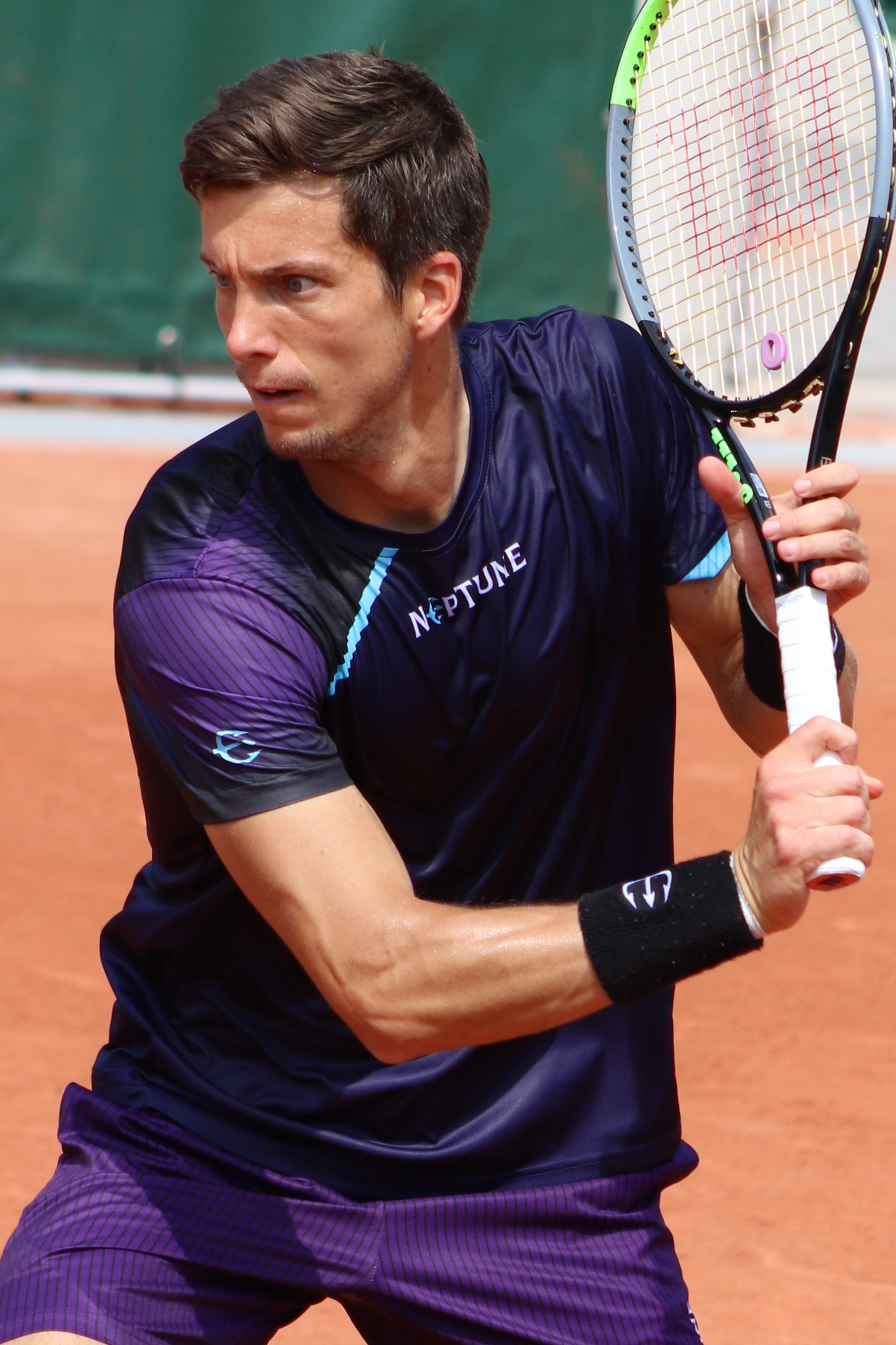
- Bedene at the 2021 French Open
- Country (sports): Slovenia (2008–2015, 2018–2022); Great Britain (2015–2017)
- Born: 18 July 1989 (age 37) Ljubljana, SR Slovenia, SFR Yugoslavia
- Height: 1.83 m (6 ft 0 in)
- Turned pro: 2008
- Retired: 2022
- Plays: Right-handed (two-handed backhand)
- Coach: Markus Wislsperger
- Prize money: US$5,153,647

Singles
- Career record: 140–160
- Career titles: 0
- Highest ranking: No. 43 (19 February 2018)

Grand Slam singles results
- Australian Open: 2R (2020)
- French Open: 3R (2016, 2020, 2022)
- Wimbledon: 3R (2017, 2021)
- US Open: 3R (2019)

Doubles
- Career record: 21–49
- Career titles: 0
- Highest ranking: No. 127 (7 October 2013)

Grand Slam doubles results
- Australian Open: 1R (2016, 2019, 2020, 2021)
- French Open: 2R (2013, 2020)
- Wimbledon: 1R (2013, 2015, 2022)
- US Open: 1R (2015, 2022)
- Last updated on: 22 September 2022.

Aljaž Bedene (born 18 July 1989) is a Slovenian former professional tennis player. He was ranked as high as No. 43 in singles by the Association of Tennis Professionals (ATP), which he achieved in February 2018. He reached four singles finals on the ATP Tour as well as the third round at three of the four Grand Slam tournaments. He also attained his career-high ranking of No. 127 in doubles in October 2013. Between 2015 and 2017, Bedene represented Great Britain after becoming a naturalised Briton before he returned to represent Slovenia in 2018.

As a junior, Bedene was ranked as high as No. 31 in the world (achieved in 2007) and won eight titles across singles and doubles. As a professional, Bedene made his top 100 debut in 2012 shortly after winning his fourth title on the ATP Challenger Tour that year. He has since won a total of 21 singles titles and three doubles titles across both the Challenger Tour and the ITF Men's World Tennis Tour.

Bedene represented Slovenia after turning professional in 2008. On 31 March 2015, he was granted UK citizenship and began representing Great Britain, but the International Tennis Federation rejected his application to represent Great Britain in the Davis Cup as he had previously played three dead rubbers for Slovenia. After his appeals failed, Bedene switched his representation back to his birth country of Slovenia for the 2018 season.

== Early and personal life ==
Aljaž Bedene was born on 18 July 1989 in Ljubljana. Bedene's father, Branko, is a dental industry worker and his mother, Darlen, works for the Ministry of Defence. Aljaž and his younger twin brother, Andraž, used to compete for Slovenia's top tennis honours and the two met regularly in competition finals. His nickname is Ali or Benke, and he speaks English, Slovenian and Croatian.

In 2008, Aljaž made the decision to pursue his tennis career in the UK because he felt it was stagnating under the limitations he encountered in Slovenia. He ended a seven-year wait to become a British citizen on 26 March 2015 and became British no. 2 behind Andy Murray.

Aljaž has lived in Welwyn Garden City since 2008 with his girlfriend, pop star Kimalie, formerly part of the Slovenian group Foxy Teens. Bedene was based at the Global Tennis Connections Academy in Gosling.

In January 2018 Bedene began representing his birth nation of Slovenia again.

== Career ==
=== 2011: ATP debut ===
Not counting the Davis Cup competition, he competed in his first ATP tournament at Erste Bank Open in Vienna, Austria. He reached the second round where he lost in three sets against Tommy Haas.

=== 2012: Four Challenger titles, top 100 debut ===
Bedene made his first ATP quarterfinal appearance at the Erste Bank Open. In the quarterfinal he played against no. 2 seed Janko Tipsarević and lost after retiring in the second set.

He made his top 100 debut at World No. 83 on 30 July 2012 following his fourth title at the 2012 ATP China Challenger International.

=== 2013: Grand Slam debut ===
Bedene made his first ATP semifinal appearance at the Aircel Chennai Open defeating the no. 6 seed Robin Haase in the second round and the no. 4 seed Stanislas Wawrinka in the quarterfinals. In the semifinal, he lost against no. 2 seed Janko Tipsarević.

At the Australian Open he played in his first Grand Slam tournament. He lost in the first round to Benjamin Becker.

=== 2014: First Masters 1000 third round in Miami ===
On 9 May, it was announced that Bedene had applied for a British passport, with legal support from the Lawn Tennis Association.

=== 2015: First ATP final, Top 50 debut ===
Starting the year in 2015 Aircel Chennai Open, Bedene reached the finals by defeating Lukáš Lacko, Feliciano López, Guillermo García López, and Roberto Bautista Agut in three sets. He lost the final to Stan Wawrinka in straight sets.

On 26 March, Bedene, the world no 83, was granted UK citizenship. Bedene said he planned to appeal against a new rule which prevents players from representing more than one country in Davis Cup. Bedene played three dead rubbers for Slovenia in Davis Cup action in 2010, 2011 and 2012.

On 30 May, the International Tennis Federation announced that Bedene would not be allowed to represent Great Britain in the Davis Cup in response to the Lawn Tennis Association who had appealed a rule brought on 1 January, forbidding players from representing two nations in the competition. Bedene's case had been based on his passport application being submitted before the new regulation was implemented. On 17 November, Bedene and representatives from the Lawn Tennis Association flew to Prague to appeal for the right of Bedene to play Davis Cup for Great Britain. However, the Lawn Tennis Association did not submit a 70-page summary of its support for the player until just before the meeting. The International Tennis Federation said the hearing of the appeal would be adjourned until the next board meeting on 20–21 March 2016, so it could consider the document.

He made his top 50 debut on 19 October 2015.

=== 2016: First Major third round at the French Open ===
The International Tennis Federation, which was meeting in Moldova on 20 March, considered Bedene's appeal to represent Great Britain in Davis Cup. The International Tennis Federation decided that Bedene was not eligible to represent Great Britain in Davis Cup or the Olympics. Bedene decided to consider seeking a ruling from the Court of Arbitration for Sport.

In March, he split from his coach James Davidson, and Davis Cup captain Leon Smith supervised him at the French Open. Bedene progressed to the third round of a Grand Slam for the first time, where he was beaten by Novak Djokovic.

=== 2017: Second Major third round and ATP final ===
In March, Bedene won the Irving Tennis Classic, defeating Mikhail Kukushkin in the final in three sets, before going on in April to win the 2017 Verrazzano Open defeating Benoît Paire in two sets in the final and then the 2017 Open Città della Disfida defeating Gastão Elias, also in two sets. Also in April, Bedene reached the Gazprom Hungarian Open final, where he lost to Lucas Pouille in two sets.

=== 2018: Third ATP final, Career-high ranking ===
Bedene, representing Slovenia again, reached the finals of the Argentina Open in February, defeating Jiří Veselý, Albert Ramos Viñolas, Diego Schwartzman, and Federico Delbonis before losing to Dominic Thiem. As a result, he reached a new career-high of World No. 43 in singles on 19 February 2018.

=== 2021: Wimbledon third round ===
Bedene started his 2021 season at the first edition of the Great Ocean Road Open. Seeded 13th, he reached the third round and lost to fourth seed and eventual champion, Jannik Sinner. At the Australian Open, he was defeated in the first round by Alexander Bublik.

In Montpellier, Bedene upset fifth seed, Jannik Sinner, in the first round. He was eliminated in the second round by Egor Gerasimov. At the Dubai Championships, he was beaten in the third round by Kei Nishikori. He lost in the second round of the Miami Open to 28th seed Kei Nishikori.

Starting his clay-court season at the Sardegna Open, Bedene made it to the quarterfinals where he fell to second seed Taylor Fritz. In Belgrade, he beat rising American star, Sebastian Korda, in the first round in three sets. He was defeated in the second round by third seed and eventual finalist, Aslan Karatsev, despite having match point at 6–5 in the third set. At the Italian Open, he was eliminated in the final round of qualifying by Hugo Dellien. However, due to the withdrawal of Casper Ruud, Bedene received entry into the main draw as a lucky loser. He was beaten in the first round by Jan-Lennard Struff. After Rome, he competed at the Lyon Open. He upset fourth seed, David Goffin, in the second round. He lost in the quarterfinals to Italian rising star Lorenzo Musetti. Seeded seventh at the first edition of the Emilia-Romagna Open in Parma, he was defeated in the second round by Italian wildcard and eventual finalist, Marco Cecchinato. Ranked 56 at the French Open, he lost in the second round to 10th seed Diego Schwartzman.

Starting his grass-court season at the Queen's Club Championships, Bedene was defeated in the first round by American Frances Tiafoe. In Eastbourne, he was eliminated in the first round by Márton Fucsovics in three sets. Ranked 64 at Wimbledon, he reached the third round for a second time in his career at this Major where he lost to seventh seed and eventual finalist, Matteo Berrettini.

Seeded fifth at the Croatia Open, Bedene lost in the first round to Marco Cecchinato.

=== 2022: Third French Open third round, retirement ===
At the 2022 French Open he used his protected ranking after coming back from an eight-month hiatus and reached the third round for the third time in his career at this Grand Slam. He lost to top seed Novak Djokovic. He announced that he would retire at the end of the season after the Slovenia's Davis Cup tie to become a football agent.

== Performance timelines ==
Key
W	F	SF	QF	#R	RR	Q#	P#	DNQ	A	Z#	PO	G	S	B	NMS	NTI	P	NH

(W) winner; (F) finalist; (SF) semifinalist; (QF) quarterfinalist; (#R) rounds 4, 3, 2, 1; (RR) round-robin stage; (Q#) qualification round; (P#) preliminary round; (DNQ) did not qualify; (A) absent; (Z#) Davis/Fed Cup Zonal Group (with number indication) or (PO) play-off; (G) gold, (S) silver or (B) bronze Olympic/Paralympic medal; (NMS) not a Masters tournament; (NTI) not a Tier I tournament; (P) postponed; (NH) not held; (SR) strike rate (events won / competed); (W–L) win–loss record.
To avoid confusion and double counting, these charts are updated at the conclusion of a tournament or when the player's participation has ended.

=== Singles ===
Tournament	2009	2010	2011	2012	2013	2014	2015	2016	2017	2018	2019	2020	2021	2022	SR	W–L
Grand Slam tournaments
Australian Open	A	A	A	Q2	1R	1R	1R	1R	1R	1R	1R	2R	1R	A	0 / 9	1–9
French Open	A	A	A	Q2	1R	A	1R	3R	2R	1R	1R	3R	2R	3R	0 / 9	8–9
Wimbledon	A	Q2	A	Q1	1R	1R	2R	1R	3R	2R	1R	NH	3R	1R	0 / 9	6–9
US Open	A	A	A	Q2	1R	Q3	2R	1R	1R	1R	3R	1R	A	1R	0 / 8	3–8
Win–loss	0–0	0–0	0–0	0–0	0–4	0–2	2–4	2–4	3–4	1–4	2–4	3–3	3–3	2–3	0 / 35	18–35
ATP Masters 1000
Indian Wells Masters	A	A	A	A	1R	A	Q1	1R	A	A	A	NH	A	1R	0 / 3	0–3
Miami Masters	A	A	A	A	2R	3R	Q1	2R	1R	1R	1R	NH	2R	1R	0 / 8	5–8
Monte-Carlo Masters	A	A	A	A	A	A	A	2R	A	2R	1R	NH	A	A	0 / 3	2–3
Madrid Masters	A	A	A	A	A	A	A	A	A	A	A	NH	A	A	0 / 0	0–0
Rome Masters	A	A	A	A	A	A	A	1R	2R	3R	Q1	Q2	1R	A	0 / 4	3–4
Canada Masters	A	A	A	A	A	A	A	A	A	A	A	NH	A	A	0 / 0	0–0
Cincinnati Masters	A	A	A	A	Q1	A	A	A	A	A	A	3R	A	A	0 / 1	2–1
Shanghai Masters	A	A	A	A	A	A	A	A	2R	A	A	NH		A	0 / 1	1–1
Paris Masters	A	A	A	A	A	A	2R	A	A	A	A	1R	A	A	0 / 2	1–2
Win–loss	0–0	0–0	0–0	0–0	1–2	2–1	1–1	2–4	2–3	3–3	0–2	2–2	1–2	0–2	0 / 22	14–22
Career statistics
	2009	2010	2011	2012	2013	2014	2015	2016	2017	2018	2019	2020	2021	2022	Career	
Tournaments	0	0	1	4	18	9	17	19	18	19	20	12	15	10	162	
Titles	0	0	0	0	0	0	0	0	0	0	0	0	0	0	0	
Finals	0	0	0	0	0	0	1	0	1	1	1	0	0	0	4	
Overall win–loss	0–0	1–0	1–2	4–4	11–18	5–9	17–17	12–19	19–18	21–19	20–17	10–12	15–15	4–10	140–160	
Win %	–	100%	33%	50%	38%	36%	50%	39%	51%	52%	53%	53%	50%	29%	46.67%	
Year-end ranking	303	540	165	98	87	145	45	101	49	67	58	58	109			

=== Doubles ===
Tournament	2013	2014	2015	2016	...	2019	2020	2021	2022	SR	W–L	Win%
Grand Slam tournaments
Australian Open	A	A	A	1R		1R	1R	1R	A	0 / 4	0–4	0%
French Open	2R	A	1R	A		1R	2R	1R	1R	0 / 6	2–6	25%
Wimbledon	1R	A	1R	A		A	NH	A	1R	0 / 3	0–3	0%
US Open	A	A	1R	A		A	A	A	A	0 / 1	0–1	0%
Win–loss	1–2	0–0	0–3	0–1		0–2	1–2	0–2	0–2	0 / 14	2–14	13%

== ATP career finals ==
=== Singles: 4 (4 runner-ups) ===
Legend Grand Slam (0–0) ATP Finals (0–0) ATP Masters 1000 (0–0) ATP 500 Series (0–0) ATP 250 Series (0–4)	Titles by surface Hard (0–2) Clay (0–2) Grass (0–0)	Titles by setting Outdoor (0–3) Indoor (0–1)

Result	W–L	Date	Tournament	Tier	Surface	Opponent	Score
Loss	0–1	Jan 2015	Chennai Open, India	250 Series	Hard	(Switzerland) Stan Wawrinka	4–6, 3–6
Loss	0–2	Apr 2017	Hungarian Open, Hungary	250 Series	Clay	(France) Lucas Pouille	3–6, 1–6
Loss	0–3	Feb 2018	Argentina Open, Argentina	250 Series	Clay	(Austria) Dominic Thiem	2–6, 4–6
Loss	0–4	Sep 2019	Moselle Open, France	250 Series	Hard (i)	(France) Jo-Wilfried Tsonga	7–6^{(7–4)}, 6–7^{(4–7)}, 3–6

== Challenger and Futures Finals ==
=== Singles: 27 (21–6) ===
Legend (singles) ATP Challenger Tour (16–2) ITF Futures Tour (5–4)	Finals by surface Hard (5–1) Clay (16–5) Grass (0–0) Carpet (0–0)

Result	W–L	Date	Tournament	Tier	Surface	Opponent	Score
Loss	0–1	Jun 2009	Slovenia F2, Maribor	Futures	Clay	(Slovenia) Marko Tkalec	7–5, 3–6, 4–6
Loss	0–2	Jul 2009	Austria F5, Telfs	Futures	Clay	(Austria) Johannes Ager	3–6, 6–7^{(2–7)}
Win	1–2	Jul 2009	Slovakia F2, Piešťany	Futures	Clay	(Czech Republic) Martin Fafl	6–0, 2–0 ret.
Win	2–2	Aug 2009	Austria F7, St Poelten	Futures	Clay	(France) Benoît Paire	6–4, 6–0 ret.
Win	3–2	Sep 2009	Austria F9, Wels	Futures	Clay	(Austria) Nicolas Reissig	6–1, 6–2
Win	4–2	Oct 2009	Croatia F9, Dubrovnik	Futures	Clay	(Hungary) Attila Balázs	6–2, 7–6^{(13–11)}
Win	5–2	Nov 2009	Turkey F13, Antalya	Futures	Clay	(Bosnia and Herzegovina) Aldin Šetkić	6–2, 6–1
Loss	5–3	May 2010	Bosnia and Herzegovina F3, Doboj	Futures	Clay	(Czech Republic) Michal Schmid	7–5, 2–6, 6–7^{(4–7)}
Win	6–3	Mar 2011	Barletta, Italy	Challenger	Clay	(Italy) Filippo Volandri	7–5, 6–3
Loss	6–4	Oct 2011	Croatia F12, Solin	Futures	Clay	(Netherlands) Nick van der Meer	6–3, 4–6, 2–6
Win	7–4	Feb 2012	Casablanca, Morocco	Challenger	Clay	(France) Nicolas Devilder	7–6^{(8–6)}, 7–6^{(7–4)}
Win	8–4	Apr 2012	Barletta, Italy	Challenger	Clay	(Italy) Potito Starace	6–2, 6–0
Win	9–4	Jun 2012	Košice, Slovakia	Challenger	Clay	(Germany) Simon Greul	7–6^{(7–1)}, 6–2
Loss	9–5	Jul 2012	Anning, China	Challenger	Clay	(Slovenia) Grega Žemlja	6–1, 5–7, 3–6
Win	10–5	Jul 2012	Wuhan, China	Challenger	Hard	(France) Josselin Ouanna	6–3, 4–6, 6–3
Win	11–5	May 2013	Rome, Italy	Challenger	Clay	(Italy) Filippo Volandri	6–4, 6–2
Win	12–5	Sep 2013	Banja Luka, Bosnia and Herzegovina	Challenger	Clay	(Argentina) Diego Schwartzman	6–3, 6–4
Win	13–5	Jun 2014	Todi, Italy	Challenger	Clay	(Hungary) Márton Fucsovics	2–6, 7–6^{(7–4)}, 6–4
Win	14–5	Mar 2015	Irving, United States	Challenger	Hard	(United States) Tim Smyczek	7–6^{(7–3)}, 3–6, 6–3
Win	15–5	May 2015	Rome, Italy	Challenger	Clay	(Czech Republic) Adam Pavlásek	7–5, 6–2
Win	16–5	Jul 2015	Todi, Italy	Challenger	Clay	(Argentina) Nicolás Kicker	7–6^{(7–3)}, 6–4
Loss	16–6	Mar 2016	Irving, United States	Challenger	Hard	(Spain) Marcel Granollers	1–6, 1–6
Win	17–6	Mar 2017	Irving, United States	Challenger	Hard	(Kazakhstan) Mikhail Kukushkin	6–4, 3–6, 6–1
Win	18–6	Apr 2017	Sophia Antipolis, France	Challenger	Clay	(France) Benoît Paire	6–2, 6–2
Win	19–6	Apr 2017	Barletta, Italy	Challenger	Clay	(Portugal) Gastão Elias	7–6^{(7–4)}, 6–3
Win	20–6	Sep 2018	Orléans, France	Challenger	Hard	(France) Antoine Hoang	4–6, 6–1, 7–6^{(8–6)}
Win	21–6	Aug 2019	Portorož, Slovenia	Challenger	Hard	(Norway) Viktor Durasovic	7–5, 6–3

=== Doubles: 7 (3–4) ===
Legend (doubles) ATP Challenger Tour (1–2) ITF Futures Tour (2–2)	Finals by surface Hard (0–1) Clay (2–3) Grass (0–0) Carpet (1–0)

Result	W–L	Date	Tournament	Tier	Surface	Partner	Opponents	Score
Win	1–0	Jan 2009	Austria F3	Futures	Carpet	(Slovakia) Andrej Martin	(Austria) Gerald Melzer (Austria) Nicolas Reissig	6–3, 6–2
Win	2–0	Aug 2009	Austria F7	Futures	Clay	(Slovenia) Andraz Bedene	(Austria) Pascal Brunner (Austria) Michael Linzer	6–4, 6–3
Win	3–0	Sep 2011	Ljubljana, Slovenia	Challenger	Clay	(Slovenia) Grega Žemlja	(Spain) Roberto Bautista Agut (Spain) Iván Navarro	6–3, 6–7^{(10–12)}, [12–10]
Loss	3–1	May 2012	Bosnia and Herzegovina F2	Futures	Clay	(Bosnia and Herzegovina) Damir Džumhur	(Slovenia) Tomislav Ternar (Austria) Lukas Weinhandl	3–6, 6–7^{(4–7)}
Loss	3–2	May 2012	Slovenia F1	Futures	Clay	(Slovenia) Grega Žemlja	(Croatia) Mislav Hižak (Austria) Tristan-Samuel Weissborn	Walkover
Loss	3–3	Jul 2013	Portorož, Slovenis	Challenger	Hard	(Slovenia) Blaž Rola	(Croatia) Marin Draganja (Croatia) Mate Pavić	3–6, 6–1, [6–10]
Loss	3–4	Sep 2013	Trnava, Slovakia	Challenger	Clay	(Czech Republic) Jaroslav Pospíšil	(Croatia) Marin Draganja (Croatia) Mate Pavić	5–7, 6–4, [6–10]

== Wins over top 10 players ==
#	Player	Rank	Event	Surface	Rd	Score	ABR
2018
1.	(South Africa) Kevin Anderson	7	Rome Masters, Italy	Clay	2R	6–4, ret.	65
2020
2.	(Greece) Stefanos Tsitsipas	6	Rotterdam Open, Netherlands	Hard (i)	2R	7–5, 6–4	52

== Davis Cup ==
=== Singles performances (9–1) ===
Edition	Round	Date	Against	Surface	Opponent	Win/Loss	Result
2010 Europe/Africa Zone Group II	1R	03-07-2010	Norway	Hard (I)	(Norway) Stian Boretti	Win	6–3, 6–2
2011 Europe/Africa Zone Group I	2R	07-10-2011	Italy	Clay	(Italy) Fabio Fognini	Loss	2–6, 2–2, ret.
2012 Europe/Africa Zone Group I	1R	02-12-2012	Denmark	Hard (I)	(Denmark) Thomas Kromann	Win	6–3, 3–6, 6–4
2018 Europe/Africa Zone Group II	1R	03-02-2018	Poland	Hard (I)	(Poland) Kamil Majchrzak	Win	6–3, 6–4
2018 Europe/Africa Zone Group II	1R	04-02-2018	Poland	Hard (I)	(Poland) Hubert Hurkacz	Win	6–4, 7–5
2018 Europe/Africa Zone Group II	PO	07-04-2018	Turkey	Clay	(Turkey) Altuğ Çelikbilek	Win	6–4, 6–2
2018 Europe/Africa Zone Group II	PO	08-04-2018	Turkey	Clay	(Turkey) Cem İlkel	Win	7–6^{(7–4)}, 6–2
2019 Europe/Africa Zone Group II	1R	13-09-2019	Egypt	Clay	(Egypt) Karim-Mohamed Maamoun	Win	7–5, 4–1, ret.
2019 Europe/Africa Zone Group II	1R	14-09-2019	Egypt	Clay	(Egypt) Mohamed Safwat	Win	7–5, 7–5
2022 Davis Cup World Group II	PO	16-09-2022	Estonia	Clay	(Estonia) Kristjan Tamm	Win	6–7^{(5–7)}, 6–3, 6–4

=== Doubles performances (2–2) ===
Edition	Round	Date	Against	Surface	Partner	Opponents	Win/Loss	Result
2018 Europe/Africa Zone Group II	1R	04-02-2018	Poland	Hard (I)	(Slovenia) Blaž Rola	(Poland) Marcin Matkowski (Poland) Mateusz Kowalczyk	Loss	7–5, 6–7^{(5–7)}, 4–6
2018 Europe/Africa Zone Group II	PO	08-04-2018	Turkey	Clay	(Slovenia) Tom Kočevar-Dešman	(Turkey) Cem İlkel (Turkey) Anıl Yüksel	Loss	3–6, 6–3, 3–6
2019 Europe/Africa Zone Group II	1R	14-09-2019	Egypt	Clay	(Slovenia) Blaž Rola	(Egypt) Sherif Sabry (Egypt) Mohamed Safwat	Win	7–5, 6–3
2022 Davis Cup World Group II	PO	18-09-2022	Estonia	Clay	(Slovenia) Blaž Kavčič	(Estonia) Kenneth Raisma (Estonia) Mattias Siimar	Win	6–3, 3–6, 6–1
