= Irving Tennis Classic =

Defunct tennis tournament
- Founded: 2012
- Location: Irving, Texas; United States
- Venue: Four Seasons Resort and Club Dallas at Las Colinas
- Category: ATP Challenger Tour
- Surface: Hard / Outdoors
- Draw: 32S/32Q/16D
- Prize money: US$150,000+H
- Website: Website

Current champions
- Men's singles: (Kazakhstan) Mikhail Kukushkin
- Men's doubles: (Germany) Philipp Petzschner (Austria) Alexander Peya

The Irving Tennis Classic (previously held as Dallas Tennis Classic) was a tennis tournament held annually in Irving, Texas, United States from 2012 until 2018. The event was one of main tournaments of the ATP Challenger Tour calendar and was played on outdoor hardcourts.

== History ==
The Irving Tennis Classic is one of the most prestigious Challenger tournaments since its foundation in 2012, when it replaced the BMW Tennis Championship. Held annually in mid-March, the tournament usually presents a high level in terms of player rankings, similar or even higher than some ATP 250 Series tournaments. (Note: The last direct acceptance of the 2012 Brasil Open Main Draw is five ranks below the last direct acceptance of the 2012 Dallas Tennis Classic Main Draw, for example.) This occurs because the tournament is scheduled in-between the Indian Wells Masters and the Miami Open. This way, Top 50 players and below that are eliminated early at Indian Wells come to play in Irving. (Note: Unlike other ATP Challenger Level events, top 50 ATP ranked players in the world can play in the Irving Tennis Classic without obtaining a wildcard, as explained in the 2018 Irving Tennis Classic Acceptance List.) The first two editions of the tournaments were named Dallas Tennis Classic, but the tournament has been held at the Four Seasons Resort and Club Dallas at Las Colinas since its first edition. As the Resort is actually located in Irving, the tournament was renamed in 2014 to reflect that. The official playing surface of the tournament is SportMaster Sport Surfaces.

Prestigious players that played in Irving include Marin Čilić, Tommy Haas, Jürgen Melzer, and David Goffin.

== Past finals ==
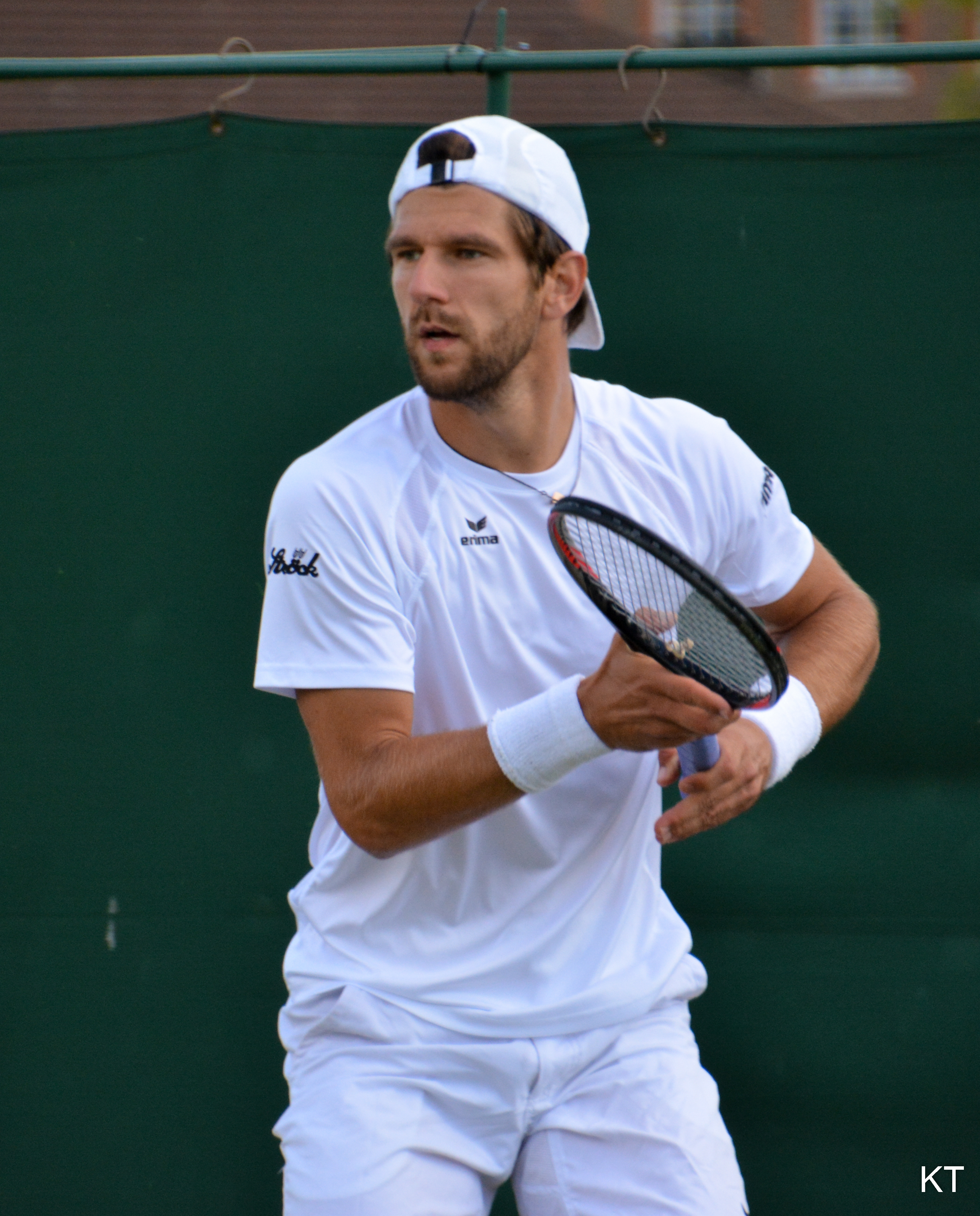
Jürgen Melzer is the only player to win the title in both singles and doubles. He did that in 2013.

=== Singles ===
Year	Champion	Runner-up	Score
2012	(Canada) Frank Dancevic	(Russia) Igor Andreev	7–6^{(7–4)}, 6–3
2013	(Austria) Jürgen Melzer	(United States) Denis Kudla	6–4, 2–6, 6–1
2014	(Czech Republic) Lukáš Rosol	(United States) Steve Johnson	6–0, 6–3
2015	(Slovenia) Aljaž Bedene	(United States) Tim Smyczek	7–6^{(7–3)}, 3–6, 6–3
2016	(Spain) Marcel Granollers	(United Kingdom) Aljaž Bedene	6–1, 6–1
2017	(United Kingdom) Aljaž Bedene	(Kazakhstan) Mikhail Kukushkin	6–4, 3–6, 6–1
2018	(Kazakhstan) Mikhail Kukushkin	(Italy) Matteo Berrettini	6–2, 3–6, 6–1

=== Doubles ===
Year	Champions	Runners-up	Score
2012	(Mexico) Santiago González (United States) Scott Lipsky	(United States) Bobby Reynolds (United States) Michael Russell	6–4, 6–3
2013	(Austria) Jürgen Melzer (Germany) Philipp Petzschner	(United States) Eric Butorac (United Kingdom) Dominic Inglot	6–3, 6–1
2014	(Mexico) Santiago González (United States) Scott Lipsky	(Australia) John-Patrick Smith (New Zealand) Michael Venus	4–6, 7–6^{(9–7)}, [10–7]
2015	(Sweden) Robert Lindstedt (Ukraine) Sergiy Stakhovsky	(Germany) Benjamin Becker (Germany) Philipp Petzschner	6–4, 6–4
2016	(United States) Nicholas Monroe (Pakistan) Aisam-ul-Haq Qureshi	(Australia) Chris Guccione (Brazil) André Sá	6–2, 5–7, [10–4]
2017	(New Zealand) Marcus Daniell (Brazil) Marcelo Demoliner	(Austria) Oliver Marach (France) Fabrice Martin	6–3, 6–4
2018	(Germany) Philipp Petzschner (Austria) Alexander Peya	(Moldova) Radu Albot (Australia) Matthew Ebden	6–2, 6–4
