= 2019 Meerbusch Challenger =

- Date: 12–18 August
- Edition: 7th
- Draw: 48S/16D
- Surface: Clay
- Location: Meerbusch, Germany

Champions

Singles
- (Portugal) Pedro Sousa

Doubles
- (Germany) Andre Begemann / (Romania) Florin Mergea
| ← 2018 · | Meerbusch Challenger | · 2021 → |

The 2019 Meerbusch Challenger was a professional tennis tournament played on clay courts. It was the seventh edition of the tournament which was part of the 2019 ATP Challenger Tour. It took place in Meerbusch, Germany, between 12 and 18 August 2019.

== Singles main draw entrants ==
=== Seeds ===
| Country | Player | Rank^{1} | Seed |
|---|---|---|---|
| POR | Pedro Sousa | 113 | 1 |
| GBR | Jay Clarke | 192 | 2 |
| SRB | Peđa Krstin | 238 | 3 |
| FRA | Tristan Lamasine | 249 | 4 |
| DOM | José Hernández-Fernández | 251 | 5 |
| ESP | Roberto Ortega Olmedo | 259 | 6 |
| GBR | Jan Choinski | 262 | 7 |
| BRA | Thomaz Bellucci | 266 | 8 |
| RUS | Pavel Kotov | 267 | 9 |
| RUS | Aslan Karatsev | 272 | 10 |
| ITA | Raúl Brancaccio | 280 | 11 |
| FRA | Baptiste Crepatte | 281 | 12 |
| ESP | Javier Barranco Cosano | 285 | 13 |
| ESP | Oriol Roca Batalla | 297 | 14 |
| SUI | Marc-Andrea Hüsler | 300 | 15 |
| GER | Benjamin Hassan | 301 | 16 |

- ^{1} Rankings as of 5 August 2019.

=== Other entrants ===
The following players received wildcards into the singles main draw:

- (Germany) Kai Breitbach
- (Serbia) Pavle Daljev
- (Germany) Lucas Gerch
- (Germany) Henri Squire
- (Germany) Louis Wessels

The following players received entry into the singles main draw using protected rankings:

- (Spain) Íñigo Cervantes
- (Georgia (country)) Aleksandre Metreveli
- (Spain) Daniel Muñoz de la Nava

The following players received entry into the singles main draw using their ITF World Tennis Ranking:

- (Spain) Eduard Esteve Lobato
- (Belgium) Christopher Heyman
- (Egypt) Karim-Mohamed Maamoun
- (Russia) Ivan Nedelko
- (Belgium) Jeroen Vanneste

The following players received entry from the qualifying draw:

- (Spain) Ricardo Ojeda Lara
- (Germany) Mats Rosenkranz

== Champions ==
=== Singles ===
- (Portugal) Pedro Sousa def. (Serbia) Peđa Krstin 7–6^{(7–4)}, 4–6, 6–3.

=== Doubles ===
- (Germany) Andre Begemann / (Romania) Florin Mergea def. (India) Sriram Balaji / (India) Vishnu Vardhan 7–6^{(7–1)}, 6–7^{(4–7)}, [10–3].
