= 2019 Meerbusch Challenger – Singles =

Singles
- 2019 Meerbusch Challenger

Final
- Champion: (Portugal) Pedro Sousa
- Runner-up: (Serbia) Peđa Krstin
- Score: 7–6^{(7–4)}, 4–6, 6–3

Events
Singles	Doubles
← 2018 ·	Meerbusch Challenger	· 2021 →

Filip Horanský was the defending champion but chose not to defend his title.

Pedro Sousa won the title after defeating Peđa Krstin 7–6^{(7–4)}, 4–6, 6–3 in the final.

== Seeds ==
All seeds receive a bye into the second round.

1. (Portugal) Pedro Sousa (champion)
2. (United Kingdom) Jay Clarke (second round)
3. (Serbia) Peđa Krstin (final)
4. (France) Tristan Lamasine (second round)
5. (Dominican Republic) José Hernández-Fernández (second round)
6. (Spain) Roberto Ortega Olmedo (quarterfinals)
7. (United Kingdom) Jan Choinski (semifinals)
8. (Brazil) Thomaz Bellucci (third round)
9. (Russia) Pavel Kotov (third round)
10. (Russia) Aslan Karatsev (third round)
11. (Italy) Raúl Brancaccio (third round)
12. (France) Baptiste Crepatte (second round)
13. (Spain) Javier Barranco Cosano (third round)
14. (Spain) Oriol Roca Batalla (second round)
15. (Switzerland) Marc-Andrea Hüsler (second round)
16. (Germany) Benjamin Hassan (third round)

== Draw ==
=== Key ===
- Q = Qualifier
- WC = Wild card
- LL = Lucky loser
- Alt = Alternate
- SE = Special exempt
- PR = Protected ranking
- ITF = ITF entry
- JE = Junior exempt
- w/o = Walkover
- r = Retired
- d = Defaulted
- SR = Special ranking

=== Finals ===
Quarterfinals
1	(Portugal) Pedro Sousa	6	6^{1}	6
(Netherlands) Jelle Sels	2	7^{7}	3
(Spain) Carlos Taberner	6	6
(France) Tak Khunn Wang	1	0
6	(Spain) Roberto Ortega Olmedo	0	2
3	(Serbia) Peđa Krstin	6	6
7	(United Kingdom) Jan Choinski	6	6
WC	(Germany) Louis Wessels	3	3

Semifinals
1	(Portugal) Pedro Sousa	4	6	6
(Spain) Carlos Taberner	6	3	4
3	(Serbia) Peđa Krstin	6	6
7	(United Kingdom) Jan Choinski	4	1

Final
1	(Portugal) Pedro Sousa	7^{7}	4	6
3	(Serbia) Peđa Krstin	6^{4}	6	3

=== Top half ===
==== Section 1 ====
First round
(France) J Tatlot	4	3
ITF	(Egypt) K-M Maamoun	6	6
(Germany) J Lenz	6	6
WC	(Germany) H Squire	1	3
(Romania) D Dima	6	2	7^{7}
PR	(Georgia (country)) A Metreveli	2	6	6^{1}
(Netherlands) J Sels	6	3	6
ITF	(Belgium) Christopher Heyman	2	6	1

Second round
1	(Portugal) P Sousa	6	7
ITF	(Egypt) K-M Maamoun	3	5
(Germany) J Lenz	5	2
13	(Spain) J Barranco Cosano	7	6
9	(Russia) P Kotov	3	7^{7}	6
(Romania) D Dima	6	6^{5}	4
(Netherlands) J Sels	6	6
5	(Dominican Republic) J Hernández-Fernández	1	2

Third round
1	(Portugal) P Sousa	6	6
13	(Spain) J Barranco Cosano	4	1
9	(Russia) P Kotov	2	2
(Netherlands) J Sels	6	6

Quarterfinals
1	(Portugal) P Sousa	6	6^{1}	6
(Netherlands) J Sels	2	7^{7}	3

==== Section 2 ====
First round
(Germany) D Altmaier	3	4
(Spain) C Taberner	6	6
(Germany) J Härteis	6	7
ITF	(Spain) Eduard Esteve Lobato	4	5
(Uruguay) M Cuevas	1	2
(France) TK Wang	6	6
WC	(Serbia) Pavle Daljev	1	5
WC	(Germany) Kai Breitbach	6	7

Second round
4	(France) T Lamasine	7^{7}	4	2
(Spain) C Taberner	6^{4}	6	6
(Germany) J Härteis	6	1	0^{r}
16	(Germany) B Hassan	4	6	0
12	(France) Baptiste Crepatte	4	1
(France) TK Wang	6	6
WC	(Germany) K Breitbach	2	4
8	(Brazil) T Bellucci	6	6

Third round
(Spain) C Taberner	7^{7}	6
16	(Germany) B Hassan	6^{0}	3
(France) TK Wang	6	6
8	(Brazil) T Bellucci	1	2

Quarterfinals
(Spain) C Taberner	6	6
(France) TK Wang	1	0

=== Bottom half ===
==== Section 3 ====
First round
(Netherlands) T de Bakker	6^{3}	3
(Czech Republic) A Pavlásek	7^{7}	6
Q	(Germany) M Rosenkranz	4	3
ITF	(Belgium) Jeroen Vanneste	6	6
Q	(Spain) R Ojeda Lara	6	4	4
(Argentina) F Mena	3	6	6
(Czech Republic) V Šafránek	4	2
WC	(Germany) Lucas Gerch	6	6

Second round
6	(Spain) R Ortega Olmedo	6	6
(Czech Republic) A Pavlásek	3	4
ITF	(Belgium) J Vanneste	6^{7}	2
11	(Italy) R Brancaccio	7^{9}	6
14	(Spain) O Roca Batalla	4	0
(Argentina) F Mena	6	6
WC	(Germany) L Gerch	1	4
3	(Serbia) P Krstin	6	6

Third round
6	(Spain) R Ortega Olmedo	6	6^{4}	6
11	(Italy) R Brancaccio	4	7^{7}	4
(Argentina) F Mena	2	0
3	(Serbia) P Krstin	6	6

Quarterfinals
6	(Spain) R Ortega Olmedo	0	2
3	(Serbia) P Krstin	6	6

==== Section 4 ====
First round
PR	(Spain) Í Cervantes	2	4
PR	(Spain) D Muñoz de la Nava	6	6
(Czech Republic) J Šátral	7^{10}	7^{7}
ITF	(Russia) I Nedelko	6^{8}	6^{5}
WC	(Germany) L Wessels	7^{7}	7^{7}
(Russia) I Gakhov	6^{4}	6^{1}
(Germany) S Fanselow	3	4
(Netherlands) S Griekspoor	6	6

Second round
7	(United Kingdom) J Choinski	6	6
PR	(Spain) D Muñoz de la Nava	2	4
(Czech Republic) J Šátral	6	1	2
10	(Russia) A Karatsev	4	6	6
15	(Switzerland) M-A Hüsler	4	3
WC	(Germany) L Wessels	6	6
(Netherlands) S Griekspoor	6	6
2	(United Kingdom) J Clarke	3	4

Third round
7	(United Kingdom) J Choinski	6	6^{4}	7^{8}
10	(Russia) A Karatsev	4	7^{7}	6^{6}
WC	(Germany) L Wessels	7	7
(Netherlands) S Griekspoor	5	5

Quarterfinals
7	(United Kingdom) J Choinski	6	6
WC	(Germany) L Wessels	3	3
