= 2022 Meerbusch Challenger – Singles =

Singles
- 2022 Meerbusch Challenger

Final
- Champion: (Spain) Bernabé Zapata Miralles
- Runner-up: (Austria) Dennis Novak
- Score: 6–1, 6–2

Events
Singles	Doubles
← 2021 ·	Meerbusch Challenger	· 2023 →

Tomás Barrios Vera was the defending champion but chose not to defend his title.

Bernabé Zapata Miralles won the title after defeating Dennis Novak 6–1, 6–2 in the final.

== Seeds ==
1. (Spain) Bernabé Zapata Miralles (champion)
2. (Italy) Franco Agamenone (first round)
3. (Germany) Jan-Lennard Struff (second round)
4. (Germany) Yannick Hanfmann (second round)
5. (Austria) Jurij Rodionov (first round)
6. (France) Geoffrey Blancaneaux (first round)
7. (Germany) Mats Moraing (quarterfinals)
8. (Germany) Maximilian Marterer (first round)

== Draw ==
=== Key ===
- Q = Qualifier
- WC = Wild card
- LL = Lucky loser
- Alt = Alternate
- ITF = ITF entry
- PR = Protected ranking
- SR = Special ranking
- SE = Special exempt
- JE = Junior exempt
- JR = Junior Accelerator Programme entrant
- CO = College Accelerator Programme entrant
- NG = Next Gen Accelerator Program entrant
- w/o = Walkover
- r = Retired
- d = Defaulted

=== Finals ===
Semifinals
1	(Spain) Bernabé Zapata Miralles	6	6
Q	(France) Clément Tabur	4	0
(Austria) Dennis Novak	6	6
(Italy) Riccardo Bonadio	4	2

Final
1	(Spain) Bernabé Zapata Miralles	6	6
(Austria) Dennis Novak	1	2

=== Top half ===
First round
1	(Spain) B Zapata Miralles	6	6
Q	(Germany) MH Rehberg	4	2
(Ukraine) O Krutykh	3	6	6
WC	(Germany) M Topo	6	1	2
Alt	(France) D Added	6^{1}	3
PR	(India) S Nagal	7^{7}	6
(Italy) A Arnaboldi	7	6
6	(France) G Blancaneaux	5	1
4	(Germany) Y Hanfmann	6	6
Q	A Vatutin	2	2
Q	(France) C Tabur	6	2	7^{8}
(Slovakia) L Klein	4	6	6^{6}
LL	(Serbia) N Milojević	6	6
(Slovakia) F Horanský	2	1
Q	(Germany) Lucas Gerch	6	4	4
7	(Germany) M Moraing	4	6	6

Second round
1	(Spain) B Zapata Miralles	6	6
(Ukraine) O Krutykh	1	2
PR	(India) S Nagal	7	7^{7}
(Italy) A Arnaboldi	5	6^{3}
4	(Germany) Y Hanfmann	4	6	3
Q	(France) C Tabur	6	2	6
LL	(Serbia) N Milojević	7^{7}	2	2
7	(Germany) M Moraing	6^{5}	6	6

Quarterfinals
1	(Spain) B Zapata Miralles	6	1	7
PR	(India) S Nagal	2	6	5
Q	(France) C Tabur	6	6
7	(Germany) M Moraing	4	0

Semifinals
1	(Spain) B Zapata Miralles	6	6
Q	(France) C Tabur	4	0

=== Bottom half ===
First round
5	(Austria) J Rodionov	4	3
(Bosnia and Herzegovina) D Džumhur	6	6
Alt	(Germany) H Squire	2	4
Q	(Bulgaria) A Andreev	6	6
(Austria) D Novak	6^{4}	6	7
(Czech Republic) V Kopřiva	7^{7}	2	5
WC	(Germany) R Molleker	5	0
3	(Germany) J-L Struff	7	6
8	(Germany) M Marterer	3	6^{4}
(Czech Republic) J Forejtek	6	7^{7}
Q	(Spain) Carlos López Montagud	2	0^{r}
WC	(Belgium) K Coppejans	6	1
(Portugal) F Ferreira Silva	6	3	3
A Shevchenko	4	6	6
(Italy) R Bonadio	6	1	6
2	(Italy) F Agamenone	1	6	3

Second round
(Bosnia and Herzegovina) D Džumhur	6	6
Q	(Bulgaria) A Andreev	4	2
(Austria) D Novak	1	6	6
3	(Germany) J-L Struff	6	4	4
(Czech Republic) J Forejtek	6^{4}	6	6
WC	(Belgium) K Coppejans	7^{7}	4	4
A Shevchenko	5	6	5
(Italy) R Bonadio	7	4	7

Quarterfinals
(Bosnia and Herzegovina) D Džumhur	1	3
(Austria) D Novak	6	6
(Czech Republic) J Forejtek	4	3
(Italy) R Bonadio	6	6

Semifinals
(Austria) D Novak	6	6
(Italy) R Bonadio	4	2
