= 2022 Meerbusch Challenger =

- Date: 8–14 August
- Edition: 9th
- Surface: Clay
- Location: Meerbusch, Germany

Champions

Singles
- (Spain) Bernabé Zapata Miralles

Doubles
- (Netherlands) David Pel / (Poland) Szymon Walków
← 2021 ·	Meerbusch Challenger	· 2023 →

The 2022 Rhein Asset Open was a professional tennis tournament played on clay courts. It was the ninth edition of the tournament which was part of the 2022 ATP Challenger Tour. It took place in Meerbusch, Germany, between 8 and 14 August 2022.

== Singles main draw entrants ==
=== Seeds ===
Country	Player	Rank^{1}	Seed
ESP	Bernabé Zapata Miralles	89	1
ITA	Franco Agamenone	108	2
GER	Jan-Lennard Struff	123	3
GER	Yannick Hanfmann	139	4
AUT	Jurij Rodionov	143	5
FRA	Geoffrey Blancaneaux	151	6
GER	Mats Moraing	152	7
GER	Maximilian Marterer	154	8

- ^{1} Rankings as of 1 August 2022.

=== Other entrants ===
The following players received wildcards into the singles main draw:

- (Belgium) Kimmer Coppejans
- (Germany) Rudolf Molleker
- (Germany) Marko Topo

The following player received entry into the singles main draw using a protected ranking:

- (India) Sumit Nagal

The following players received entry into the singles main draw as alternates:

- (France) Dan Added
- (Ukraine) ~~Vitaliy Sachko~~
- (Germany) Henri Squire

The following players received entry from the qualifying draw:

- (Bulgaria) Adrian Andreev
- (Germany) Lucas Gerch
- (Spain) Carlos López Montagud
- (Germany) Max Hans Rehberg
- (France) Clément Tabur
- Alexey Vatutin

The following player received entry as a lucky loser:

- (Serbia) Nikola Milojević

== Champions ==
=== Singles ===
- (Spain) Bernabé Zapata Miralles def. (Austria) Dennis Novak 6–1, 6–2.

=== Doubles ===
- (Netherlands) David Pel / (Poland) Szymon Walków def. (Austria) Neil Oberleitner / (Austria) Philipp Oswald 7–5, 6–1.
