= 2017 Bucher Reisen Tennis Grand Prix – Doubles =

Doubles
- 2017 Bucher Reisen Tennis Grand Prix

Final
- Champions: (Germany) Kevin Krawietz (Germany) Andreas Mies
- Runners-up: (Germany) Dustin Brown (Croatia) Antonio Šančić
- Score: 6–1, 7–6^{(7–5)}

Events
Singles	Doubles
← 2016 ·	Bucher Reisen Tennis Grand Prix	· 2018 →

Mikhail Elgin and Andrei Vasilevski were the defending champions but chose not to defend their title.

Kevin Krawietz and Andreas Mies won the title after defeating Dustin Brown and Antonio Šančić 6–1, 7–6^{(7–5)} in the final.

== Seeds ==
1. (Belgium) Sander Gillé / (Belgium) Joran Vliegen (semifinals)
2. (Germany) Kevin Krawietz / (Germany) Andreas Mies (champions)
3. (Germany) Dustin Brown / (Croatia) Antonio Šančić (final)
4. (United Kingdom) Scott Clayton / (United Kingdom) Jonny O'Mara (semifinals)

== Draw ==
=== Key ===
- Q = Qualifier
- WC = Wild card
- LL = Lucky loser
- Alt = Alternate
- SE = Special exempt
- PR = Protected ranking
- ITF = ITF entry
- JE = Junior exempt
- w/o = Walkover
- r = Retired
- d = Defaulted
- SR = Special ranking

First round
1	(Belgium) S Gillé (Belgium) J Vliegen	6	6
WC	(Netherlands) Miliaan Niesten (Germany) P Torebko	3	4
WC	(Italy) Erik Crepaldi (Sweden) M Eriksson	6	7
(Kazakhstan) T Khabibulin (Serbia) M Tepavac	2	5
3	(Germany) D Brown (Croatia) A Šančić	7^{7}	6
(Spain) R Ojeda Lara (Spain) B Zapata Miralles	6^{4}	3
(Brazil) A Ghem (Belgium) Y Mertens	2	1
(Canada) S Diez (Spain) D Vega Hernández	6	6
(Romania) Adrian Barbu (Romania) F Mergea	6	4	[5]
(Germany) Jonas Lütjen (Egypt) K-M Maamoun	4	6	[10]
WC	(Germany) Marvin Greven (Germany) Jannis Kahlke	1	5
4	(United Kingdom) S Clayton (United Kingdom) J O'Mara	6	7
(Belgium) A De Greef (Belgium) Y Reuter	4	1
(Spain) Í Cervantes (Argentina) F Coria	6	6
(Belgium) K Coppejans (Brazil) E Dischinger	2	5
2	(Germany) K Krawietz (Germany) A Mies	6	7

Quarterfinals
1	(Belgium) S Gillé (Belgium) J Vliegen	6	6
WC	(Italy) E Crepaldi (Sweden) M Eriksson	4	3
3	(Germany) D Brown (Croatia) A Šančić	6	7^{7}
(Canada) S Diez (Spain) D Vega Hernández	4	6^{5}
(Germany) J Lütjen (Egypt) K-M Maamoun	6	1	[4]
4	(United Kingdom) S Clayton (United Kingdom) J O'Mara	4	6	[10]
(Spain) Í Cervantes (Argentina) F Coria
2	(Germany) K Krawietz (Germany) A Mies	w/o

Semifinals
1	(Belgium) S Gillé (Belgium) J Vliegen	3	3
3	(Germany) D Brown (Croatia) A Šančić	6	6
4	(United Kingdom) S Clayton (United Kingdom) J O'Mara	7	3	[8]
2	(Germany) K Krawietz (Germany) A Mies	5	6	[10]

Final
3	(Germany) D Brown (Croatia) A Šančić	1	6^{5}
2	(Germany) K Krawietz (Germany) A Mies	6	7^{7}
