= 2016 Cittadino Challenger – Singles =

Singles
- 2016 Cittadino Challenger

Final
- Champion: (Germany) Florian Mayer
- Runner-up: (Germany) Maximilian Marterer
- Score: 7–6^{(7–4)}, 6–2

Events
Singles	Doubles
← 2015 ·	Cittadino Challenger	· 2017 →

Andreas Haider-Maurer was the defending champion but chose not to defend his title.

Florian Mayer won the title after defeating Maximilian Marterer 7–6^{(7–4)}, 6–2 in the final.

== Seeds ==
1. (Germany) Florian Mayer (champion)
2. (Spain) Roberto Carballés Baena (quarterfinals)
3. (Netherlands) Igor Sijsling (first round, retired)
4. (Canada) Steven Diez (second round)
5. (Poland) Jerzy Janowicz (quarterfinals)
6. (Spain) Jordi Samper-Montaña (second round)
7. (Brazil) André Ghem (first round)
8. (Belarus) Uladzimir Ignatik (first round)

== Draw ==
=== Key ===
- Q = Qualifier
- WC = Wild card
- LL = Lucky loser
- Alt = Alternate
- ITF = ITF entry
- PR = Protected ranking
- SR = Special ranking
- SE = Special exempt
- JE = Junior exempt
- JR = Junior Accelerator Programme entrant
- CO = College Accelerator Programme entrant
- NG = Next Gen Accelerator Program entrant
- w/o = Walkover
- r = Retired
- d = Defaulted

=== Finals ===
Semifinals
1	(Germany) Florian Mayer	6	6
(Germany) Daniel Masur	2	2
(Belgium) Clément Geens	0	4
(Germany) Maximilian Marterer	6	6

Final
1	(Germany) Florian Mayer	7^{7}	6
(Germany) Maximilian Marterer	6^{4}	2

=== Top half ===
First round
1	(Germany) F Mayer	6	6
WC	(Belarus) Aliaksandr Prudnikau	0	3
(Argentina) JP Paz	4	6	2
WC	(Spain) N Kuhn	6	2	6
Q	(Germany) Nico Matic	0	0
(Germany) Marc Sieber	6	6
Q	(United Kingdom) D Cox	1	4
6	(Spain) J Samper-Montaña	6	6
3	(Netherlands) I Sijsling	0^{r}
Q	(Belarus) A Vasilevski	0
(Germany) D Masur	6	6
WC	(Germany) O Otte	3	0
(Georgia (country)) A Metreveli	6	2	7^{7}
(Slovakia) N Gombos	1	6	6^{4}
(Japan) A Santillan	4	7^{7}	6
8	(Belarus) U Ignatik	6	6^{4}	3

Second round
1	(Germany) F Mayer	6	6
WC	(Spain) N Kuhn	2	3
(Germany) M Sieber	4	6	7^{7}
6	(Spain) J Samper-Montaña	6	1	6^{2}
Q	(Belarus) A Vasilevski	2	1
(Germany) D Masur	6	6
(Georgia (country)) A Metreveli	2	6	6
(Japan) A Santillan	6	4	0

Quarterfinals
1	(Germany) F Mayer	6	7
(Germany) M Sieber	4	5
(Germany) D Masur	7^{7}	3	7
(Georgia (country)) A Metreveli	6^{4}	6	5

Semifinals
1	(Germany) F Mayer	6	6
(Germany) D Masur	2	2

=== Bottom half ===
First round
5	(Poland) J Janowicz	6	6
(Slovakia) F Horanský	1	2
(Germany) N Langer	4	7	3
(Belgium) G Gigounon	6	5	6
(France) Y Jankovits	4	2
(Belgium) Clément Geens	6	6
WC	(Germany) Marvin Greven	1	2
4	(Canada) S Diez	6	6
7	(Brazil) A Ghem	6	3	2
(Germany) M Marterer	3	6	6
(Russia) A Vatutin	6	6^{5}	3
(Belgium) Y Mertens	1	7^{7}	6
(Germany) Jeremy Jahn	5	6	6
(Spain) R Ortega Olmedo	7	3	3
Q	(Russia) M Elgin	0	3
2	(Spain) R Carballés Baena	6	6

Second round
5	(Poland) J Janowicz	6	3	6
(Belgium) G Gigounon	1	6	3
(Belgium) C Geens	7^{7}	6
4	(Canada) S Diez	6^{4}	4
(Germany) M Marterer	6	6
(Belgium) Y Mertens	2	4
(Germany) J Jahn	7^{7}	3^{r}
2	(Spain) R Carballés Baena	6^{3}	3

Quarterfinals
5	(Poland) J Janowicz	3	7^{7}	3
(Belgium) C Geens	6	6^{5}	6
(Germany) M Marterer	3	6	6
2	(Spain) R Carballés Baena	6	3	1

Semifinals
(Belgium) C Geens	0	4
(Germany) M Marterer	6	6
