= 2016 Cittadino Challenger =

- Date: 15–21 August
- Edition: 4th
- Draw: 32S/11D
- Prize money: €35,000+H
- Surface: Clay
- Location: Meerbusch, Germany

Champions

Singles
- (Germany) Florian Mayer

Doubles
- (Russia) Mikhail Elgin / (Belarus) Andrei Vasilevski
← 2015 ·	Cittadino Challenger	· 2017 →

The 2016 Cittadino Challenger was a professional tennis tournament played on clay courts. It was the fourth edition of the tournament which was part of the 2016 ATP Challenger Tour. It took place in Meerbusch, Germany, between 15 and 21 August 2016.

== Entrants ==
=== Seeds ===
Country	Player	Rank^{1}	Seed
GER	Florian Mayer	94	1
ESP	Roberto Carballés Baena	98	2
NED	Igor Sijsling	112	3
CAN	Steven Diez	174	4
POL	Jerzy Janowicz	175	5
ESP	Jordi Samper-Montaña	211	6
BRA	André Ghem	254	7
BLR	Uladzimir Ignatik	259	8

- ^{1} Rankings as of 8 August 2016.

=== Other entrants ===
The following players received wildcards into the singles main draw:

- (Belarus) Aliaksandr Prudnikau
- (Spain) Nicola Kuhn
- (Germany) Oscar Otte
- (Germany) Marvin Greven

The following players received entry from the qualifying draw:

- (Germany) Nico Matic
- (United Kingdom) Daniel Cox
- (Belarus) Andrei Vasilevski
- (Russia) Mikhail Elgin

== Champions ==
=== Singles ===
- (Germany) Florian Mayer def. (Germany) Maximilian Marterer, 7–6^{(7–4)}, 6–2

=== Doubles ===
- (Russia) Mikhail Elgin / (Belarus) Andrei Vasilevski def. (Belgium) Sander Gillé / (Belgium) Joran Vliegen, 7–6^{(8–6)}, 6–4
