= 2017 Bucher Reisen Tennis Grand Prix – Singles =

Singles
- 2017 Bucher Reisen Tennis Grand Prix

Final
- Champion: (Spain) Ricardo Ojeda Lara
- Runner-up: (Austria) Andreas Haider-Maurer
- Score: 6–4, 6–3

Events
Singles	Doubles
← 2016 ·	Bucher Reisen Tennis Grand Prix	· 2018 →

Florian Mayer was the defending champion but lost in the quarterfinals to Andreas Haider-Maurer.

Ricardo Ojeda Lara won the title after defeating Haider-Maurer 6–4, 6–3 in the final.

== Seeds ==
1. (Germany) Florian Mayer (quarterfinals)
2. (Belgium) Steve Darcis (second round, withdrew)
3. (Germany) Dustin Brown (first round)
4. (Belgium) Arthur De Greef (first round)
5. (Germany) Oscar Otte (second round)
6. (France) Mathias Bourgue (first round)
7. (Germany) Jeremy Jahn (quarterfinals)
8. (Czech Republic) Václav Šafránek (quarterfinals)

== Draw ==
=== Key ===
- Q = Qualifier
- WC = Wild card
- LL = Lucky loser
- Alt = Alternate
- ITF = ITF entry
- PR = Protected ranking
- SR = Special ranking
- SE = Special exempt
- JE = Junior exempt
- JR = Junior Accelerator Programme entrant
- CO = College Accelerator Programme entrant
- NG = Next Gen Accelerator Program entrant
- w/o = Walkover
- r = Retired
- d = Defaulted

=== Finals ===
Semifinals
WC	(Austria) Andreas Haider-Maurer	6	6^{3}	6
(Egypt) Karim-Mohamed Maamoun	4	7^{7}	3
(Spain) Ricardo Ojeda Lara	6	7^{7}
WC	(Spain) Nicola Kuhn	4	6^{4}

Final
WC	(Austria) Andreas Haider-Maurer	4	3
(Spain) Ricardo Ojeda Lara	6	6

=== Top half ===
First round
1	(Germany) F Mayer	6	6
(Belgium) Y Reuter	0	0
(France) T Lamasine	2	5
(Spain) B Zapata Miralles	6	7
WC	(Austria) A Haider-Maurer	3	6	6
WC	(Germany) M Bachinger	6	4	2
(Germany) D Masur	4	4
5	(Germany) O Otte	6	6
3	(Germany) D Brown	2	2
Q	(Germany) Marc Sieber	6	6
(Egypt) K-M Maamoun	6	6
(Belgium) Y Mertens	3	2
(Spain) Í Cervantes	6	3	6
(France) M Janvier	1	6	3
(Argentina) F Coria	6	0	4
7	(Germany) Jeremy Jahn	3	6	6

Second round
1	(Germany) F Mayer	1	7	6
(Spain) B Zapata Miralles	6	5	1
WC	(Austria) A Haider-Maurer	6	6
5	(Germany) O Otte	2	4
Q	(Germany) M Sieber	2	3
(Egypt) K-M Maamoun	6	6
(Spain) Í Cervantes	4	6^{3}
7	(Germany) J Jahn	6	7^{7}

Quarterfinals
1	(Germany) F Mayer	6	5	3
WC	(Austria) A Haider-Maurer	2	7	6
(Egypt) K-M Maamoun	3	6	6
7	(Germany) J Jahn	6	2	4

Semifinals
WC	(Austria) A Haider-Maurer	6	6^{3}	6
(Egypt) K-M Maamoun	4	7^{7}	3

=== Bottom half ===
First round
6	(France) M Bourgue	6	3	6^{5}
(Kazakhstan) A Nedovyesov	3	6	7^{7}
(Serbia) M Tepavac	4	4
(France) A Michon	6	6
Q	(Sweden) M Eriksson	6	6
Q	(Belgium) K Coppejans	2	1
(Spain) R Ojeda Lara	7^{7}	6
4	(Belgium) A De Greef	6^{4}	4
8	(Czech Republic) V Šafránek	6	3	6
Q	(Brazil) A Ghem	3	6	3
(Canada) S Diez	6	6
WC	(Germany) H Squire	4	2
(France) S Doumbia	4	6	6^{4}
WC	(Spain) N Kuhn	6	4	7^{7}
(France) C Lestienne	6	3	1
2	(Belgium) S Darcis	1	6	6

Second round
(Kazakhstan) A Nedovyesov	4	6	6
(France) A Michon	6	2	4
Q	(Sweden) M Eriksson	4	3
(Spain) R Ojeda Lara	6	6
8	(Czech Republic) V Šafránek	6	2	6
(Canada) S Diez	3	6	3
WC	(Spain) N Kuhn	w/o
2	(Belgium) S Darcis

Quarterfinals
(Kazakhstan) A Nedovyesov	3	6	4
(Spain) R Ojeda Lara	6	4	6
8	(Czech Republic) V Šafránek	1	6	1
WC	(Spain) N Kuhn	6	3	6

Semifinals
(Spain) R Ojeda Lara	6	7^{7}
WC	(Spain) N Kuhn	4	6^{4}
