= 2021 Meerbusch Challenger – Doubles =

Doubles
- 2021 Meerbusch Challenger

Final
- Champions: (Poland) Szymon Walków (Poland) Jan Zieliński
- Runners-up: (Germany) Dustin Brown (Netherlands) Robin Haase
- Score: 6–3, 6–1

Events
Singles	Doubles
← 2019 ·	Meerbusch Challenger	· 2022 →

Andre Begemann and Florin Mergea were the defending champions but only Begemann chose to defend his title, partnering Albano Olivetti. Begemann lost in the first round to Jesper de Jong and Bart Stevens.

Szymon Walków and Jan Zieliński won the title after defeating Dustin Brown and Robin Haase 6–3, 6–1 in the final.

== Seeds ==
1. (Ukraine) Denys Molchanov / (Kazakhstan) Aleksandr Nedovyesov (quarterfinals)
2. (Croatia) Ivan Sabanov / (Croatia) Matej Sabanov (quarterfinals)
3. (Germany) Andre Begemann / (France) Albano Olivetti (first round)
4. (Germany) Dustin Brown / (Netherlands) Robin Haase (final)

== Draw ==
=== Key ===
- Q = Qualifier
- WC = Wild card
- LL = Lucky loser
- Alt = Alternate
- ITF = ITF entry
- PR = Protected ranking
- SR = Special ranking
- SE = Special exempt
- JE = Junior exempt
- JR = Junior Accelerator Programme entrant
- CO = College Accelerator Programme entrant
- NG = Next Gen Accelerator Program entrant
- w/o = Walkover
- r = Retired
- d = Defaulted

First round
1	(Ukraine) D Molchanov (Kazakhstan) A Nedovyesov	7^{7}	6
Alt	(Slovakia) L Klein (Czech Republic) J Pospíšil	6^{5}	4
(Croatia) A Šančić (New Zealand) A Sitak	7	6
WC	(Germany) F Fallert (Germany) J Härteis	5	4
4	(Germany) D Brown (Netherlands) R Haase	6	6
(Mexico) H Hach Verdugo (Mexico) MÁ Reyes-Varela	4	2
(Philippines) R Gonzales (United States) H Johnson	7^{7}	6
WC	(Germany) Constantin Schmitz (Greece) Pe Tsitsipas	6^{2}	1
(Croatia) D Ajduković (Bosnia and Herzegovina) N Fatić	6	6
WC	(Peru) A Merino (Japan) S Mochizuki	4	1
(Netherlands) J de Jong (Netherlands) B Stevens	6	7
3	(Germany) A Begemann (France) A Olivetti	4	5
(Argentina) JP Ficovich (Argentina) N Kicker	3	2
(Poland) S Walków (Poland) J Zieliński	6	6
(Russia) B Bobrov (Russia) R Safiullin	2	6^{6}
2	(Croatia) I Sabanov (Croatia) M Sabanov	6	7^{8}

Quarterfinals
1	(Ukraine) D Molchanov (Kazakhstan) A Nedovyesov	6^{4}	5
(Croatia) A Šančić (New Zealand) A Sitak	7^{7}	7
4	(Germany) D Brown (Netherlands) R Haase	6	6
(Philippines) R Gonzales (United States) H Johnson	0	4
(Croatia) D Ajduković (Bosnia and Herzegovina) N Fatić	0	2
(Netherlands) J de Jong (Netherlands) B Stevens	6	6
(Poland) S Walków (Poland) J Zieliński	7^{7}	6
2	(Croatia) I Sabanov (Croatia) M Sabanov	6^{5}	4

Semifinals
(Croatia) A Šančić (New Zealand) A Sitak	4	4
4	(Germany) D Brown (Netherlands) R Haase	6	6
(Netherlands) J de Jong (Netherlands) B Stevens	2	7^{7}	[9]
(Poland) S Walków (Poland) J Zieliński	6	6^{2}	[11]

Final
4	(Germany) D Brown (Netherlands) R Haase	3	1
(Poland) S Walków (Poland) J Zieliński	6	6
