= 2021 Meerbusch Challenger =

- Date: 9–15 August
- Edition: 8th
- Surface: Clay
- Location: Meerbusch, Germany

Champions

Singles
- (Chile) Marcelo Tomás Barrios Vera

Doubles
- (Poland) Szymon Walków / (Poland) Jan Zieliński
← 2019 ·	Meerbusch Challenger	· 2022 →

The 2021 Rhein Asset Open presented by B&B Hotels was a professional tennis tournament played on clay courts. It was the eighth edition of the tournament which was part of the 2021 ATP Challenger Tour. It took place in Meerbusch, Germany, between 9 and 15 August 2021.

== Singles main draw entrants ==
=== Seeds ===
Country	Player	Rank^{1}	Seed
GER	Daniel Altmaier	120	1
BIH	Damir Džumhur	121	2
NED	Botic van de Zandschulp	126	3
GER	Oscar Otte	140	4
ARG	Juan Manuel Cerúndolo	145	5
CZE	Tomáš Macháč	150	6
~~SVK~~	~~Alex Molčan~~	~~153~~	~~7~~
IND	Sumit Nagal	159	8

- ^{1} Rankings as of 2 August 2021.

=== Other entrants ===
The following players received wildcards into the singles main draw:

- (Japan) Shintaro Mochizuki
- (Germany) Rudolf Molleker
- (Germany) Mats Rosenkranz

The following players received entry from the qualifying draw:

- (Croatia) Duje Ajduković
- (Netherlands) Jesper de Jong
- (Dominican Republic) Nick Hardt
- (Argentina) Nicolás Kicker

The following player received entry as a lucky loser:

- (Bosnia and Herzegovina) Nerman Fatić

== Champions ==
=== Singles ===
- (Chile) Marcelo Tomás Barrios Vera def. (Argentina) Juan Manuel Cerúndolo 7–6^{(9–7)}, 6–3.

=== Doubles ===
- (Poland) Szymon Walków / (Poland) Jan Zieliński def. (Germany) Dustin Brown / (Netherlands) Robin Haase 6–3, 6–1.
