= 2013 Maserati Challenger =

- Date: 12–18 August
- Edition: 1st
- Draw: 32S/16D
- Prize money: €30,000+H
- Surface: Clay
- Location: Meerbusch, Germany

Champions

Singles
- (Czech Republic) Jan Hájek

Doubles
- (Australia) Rameez Junaid / (Germany) Frank Moser
- Maserati Challenger

The 2013 Maserati Challenger was a professional tennis tournament played on clay courts. It was the first edition of the tournament which was part of the 2013 ATP Challenger Tour. It took taking place in Meerbusch, Germany, between 10 and 18 August 2013.

== Entrants ==
=== Seeds ===
Country	Player	Rank^{1}	Seed
NED	Jesse Huta Galung	108	1
CZE	Jan Hájek	124	2
GER	Simon Greul	164	3
ESP	Pere Riba	168	4
GER	Dustin Brown	176	5
CZE	Jan Mertl	177	6
UKR	Ivan Sergeyev	178	7
GER	Bastian Knittel	186	8

- ^{1} Rankings as of 5 August 2013

=== Other entrants ===
The following players received wildcards into the singles main draw:

- (Slovakia) Pavol Červenák
- (Slovakia) Filip Horanský
- (Germany) Robin Kern
- (Germany) Alexander Zverev

The following players received entry from the qualifying draw:

- (Serbia) Miki Janković
- (Germany) Gero Kretschmer
- (Netherlands) Miliaan Niesten
- (Russia) Alexey Vatutin

The following players received entry into the main draw as a lucky loser:

- (Belgium) Yannick Mertens

== Champions ==
=== Singles ===
- (Czech Republic) Jan Hájek def. (Netherlands) Jesse Huta Galung 6–3, 6–4

=== Doubles ===
- (Australia) Rameez Junaid / (Germany) Frank Moser def. (Germany) Dustin Brown / (Germany) Philipp Marx 6–3, 7–6^{(7–4)}
