= 2019 Meerbusch Challenger – Doubles =

Doubles
- 2019 Meerbusch Challenger

Final
- Champions: (Germany) Andre Begemann (Romania) Florin Mergea
- Runners-up: (India) Sriram Balaji (India) Vishnu Vardhan
- Score: 7–6^{(7–1)}, 6–7^{(4–7)}, [10–3]

Events
Singles	Doubles
← 2018 ·	Meerbusch Challenger	· 2021 →

In the doubles of the 2019 Meerbusch Challenger tennis competition, David Pérez Sanz and Mark Vervoort were the defending champions but only Vervoort chose to defend his title, partnering Íñigo Cervantes. Vervoort lost in the first round to Sander Arends and David Pel.

Andre Begemann and Florin Mergea won the title after defeating Sriram Balaji and Vishnu Vardhan 7–6^{(7–1)}, 6–7^{(4–7)}, [10–3] in the final.

== Seeds ==
1. (Czech Republic) Roman Jebavý / (Netherlands) Matwé Middelkoop (semifinals)
2. (Netherlands) Sander Arends / (Netherlands) David Pel (quarterfinals)
3. (Switzerland) Marc-Andrea Hüsler / (Chile) Hans Podlipnik Castillo (quarterfinals)
4. (Poland) Karol Drzewiecki / (Poland) Szymon Walków (semifinals)

== Draw ==
=== Key ===
- Q = Qualifier
- WC = Wild card
- LL = Lucky loser
- Alt = Alternate
- SE = Special exempt
- PR = Protected ranking
- ITF = ITF entry
- JE = Junior exempt
- w/o = Walkover
- r = Retired
- d = Defaulted
- SR = Special ranking

First round
1	(Czech Republic) R Jebavý (Netherlands) M Middelkoop	7	6
ITF	(Argentina) F Mena (Peru) A Merino	5	3
ITF	(Russia) Anton Chekhov (Russia) I Nedelko	2	7^{10}	[8]
WC	(Germany) B Hassan (France) T Lamasine	6	6^{8}	[10]
3	(Switzerland) M-A Hüsler (Chile) H Podlipnik Castillo	6	6
WC	(Germany) J Härteis (Germany) M Rosenkranz	3	1
(United Kingdom) S Clayton (Switzerland) L Margaroli	3	4
(India) S Balaji (India) V Vardhan	6	6
Alt	(Dominican Republic) J Hernández-Fernández (Spain) R Ortega Olmedo	6	6^{2}	[10]
(Uruguay) M Cuevas (Spain) D Marrero	4	7^{7}	[7]
WC	(Germany) Kai Breitbach (Germany) Mark Simons	2	4
4	(Poland) K Drzewiecki (Poland) S Walków	6	6
(India) VS Prashanth (Australia) S Puodziunas	6^{2}	7^{7}	[8]
(Germany) A Begemann (Romania) F Mergea	7^{7}	6^{5}	[10]
PR	(Spain) Í Cervantes (Netherlands) M Vervoort	1	0
2	(Netherlands) S Arends (Netherlands) D Pel	6	6

Quarterfinals
1	(Czech Republic) R Jebavý (Netherlands) M Middelkoop	w/o
WC	(Germany) B Hassan (France) T Lamasine
3	(Switzerland) M-A Hüsler (Chile) H Podlipnik Castillo	3	2
(India) S Balaji (India) V Vardhan	6	6
Alt	(Dominican Republic) J Hernández-Fernández (Spain) R Ortega Olmedo	4	3
4	(Poland) K Drzewiecki (Poland) S Walków	6	6
(Germany) A Begemann (Romania) F Mergea	4	6	[10]
2	(Netherlands) S Arends (Netherlands) D Pel	6	1	[6]

Semifinals
1	(Czech Republic) R Jebavý (Netherlands) M Middelkoop	6^{2}	3
(India) S Balaji (India) V Vardhan	7^{7}	6
4	(Poland) K Drzewiecki (Poland) S Walków	2	5
(Germany) A Begemann (Romania) F Mergea	6	7

Final
(India) S Balaji (India) V Vardhan	6^{1}	7^{7}	[3]
(Germany) A Begemann (Romania) F Mergea	7^{7}	6^{4}	[10]
