= 2014 Maserati Challenger – Singles =

Singles
- 2014 Maserati Challenger

Final
- Champion: (Slovakia) Jozef Kovalík
- Runner-up: (Russia) Andrey Kuznetsov
- Score: 6–1, 6–4

Events
| Singles | Doubles |
- Maserati Challenger

Wildcard Jozef Kovalik clinched his maiden ATP Challenger Tour title, beating Andrey Kuznetsov 6–1, 6–4.

== Seeds ==
1. (Spain) Albert Ramos (first round)
2. (Russia) Andrey Kuznetsov (final)
3. (Austria) Andreas Haider-Maurer (quarterfinals)
4. (Germany) Julian Reister (withdrew)
5. (Austria) Gerald Melzer (first round)
6. (Netherlands) Jesse Huta Galung (first round, retired)
7. (Moldova) Radu Albot (second round)
8. (Chile) Hans Podlipnik-Castillo (quarterfinals)

== Draw ==
Key

- Q = Qualifier
- WC = Wild card
- LL = Lucky loser
- Alt = Alternate
- ITF = ITF entry
- PR = Protected ranking
- SR = Special ranking
- SE = Special exempt
- JE = Junior exempt
- JR = Junior Accelerator Programme entrant
- CO = College Accelerator Programme entrant
- NG = Next Gen Accelerator Program entrant
- w/o = Walkover
- r = Retired
- d = Defaulted

=== Finals ===
Semifinals
WC | (Slovakia) Jozef Kovalík | 7 | 6
' (France) Tristan Lamasine | 5 | 2
(Germany) Peter Torebko | 4 | 3
2 | (Russia) Andrey Kuznetsov | 6 | 6

Final
WC | (Slovakia) Jozef Kovalík | 6 | 6
2 | (Russia) Andrey Kuznetsov | 1 | 4

=== Top half ===
First round
1 | (Spain) A Ramos | 4 | 6^{4}
(Germany) M Bachinger | 6 | 7^{7}
(Netherlands) B Westerhof | 6 | 3 | 3
(Netherlands) A van der Duim | 4 | 6 | 6
(Spain) G Granollers | 2 | 1
WC | (Slovakia) J Kovalík | 6 | 6
WC | (Germany) P Petzschner | 2 | 6^{5}
7 | (Moldova) R Albot | 6 | 7^{7}
3 | (Austria) A Haider-Maurer | 6 | 4 | 6
(Argentina) A Molteni | 2 | 6 | 3
(Egypt) M Safwat | 6 | 6
WC | (Germany) Jan Oliver Sadlowski | 1 | 1
(Italy) L Giustino | 3 | 6 | 3
(France) T Lamasine | 6 | 4 | 6
(Belgium) Y Mertens | 7^{7} | 2 | 6
5 | (Austria) G Melzer | 6^{3} | 6 | 3

Second round
(Germany) M Bachinger | 7 | 6
(Netherlands) A van der Duim | 5 | 3
WC | (Slovakia) J Kovalík | 2 | 6 | 6
7 | (Moldova) R Albot | 6 | 2 | 0
3 | (Austria) A Haider-Maurer | 6 | 6
(Egypt) M Safwat | 1 | 0
(France) T Lamasine | 3 | 6 | 6
(Belgium) Y Mertens | 6 | 4 | 3

Quarterfinals
(Germany) M Bachinger | 3 | 1
WC | (Slovakia) J Kovalík | 6 | 6
3 | (Austria) A Haider-Maurer | 7 | 6^{5} | 6^{9}
(France) T Lamasine | 5 | 7^{7} | 7^{11}

Semifinals
WC | (Slovakia) J Kovalík | 7 | 6
(France) T Lamasine | 5 | 2

=== Bottom half ===
First round
8 | (Chile) H Podlipnik | 6 | 6
Q | (Russia) P Davydenko | 3 | 2
(Canada) S Diez | 7 | 7^{7}
Q | (Germany) Matthias Wunner | 5 | 6^{1}
(Germany) P Torebko | 4 | 6 | 6
WC | (Hungary) A Balázs | 6 | 1 | 4
(Bosnia and Herzegovina) A Šetkić | 4 | 6 | 6
LL | (Chinese Taipei) T-h Yang | 6 | 2 | 0
6 | (Netherlands) J Huta Galung | 4 | 0^{r}
(Spain) J Samper Montaña | 6 | 3
(Belgium) A De Greef | 2 | 7^{7} | 6
Q | (Chile) C Garin | 6 | 6^{4} | 3
(Spain) Marc Giner | 2 | 0^{r}
Q | (France) L Lokoli | 6 | 3
(Czech Republic) J Hájek | 4 | 2
2 | (Russia) A Kuznetsov | 6 | 6

Second round
8 | (Chile) H Podlipnik | 6 | 6
(Canada) S Diez | 2 | 0
(Germany) P Torebko | 6 | 6
(Bosnia and Herzegovina) A Šetkić | 1 | 3
(Spain) J Samper Montaña | 6 | 2 | 2
(Belgium) A De Greef | 2 | 6 | 6
Q | (France) L Lokoli | 2 | 1
2 | (Russia) A Kuznetsov | 6 | 6

Quarterfinals
8 | (Chile) H Podlipnik | 3 | 4
(Germany) P Torebko | 6 | 6
(Belgium) A De Greef | 6^{4} | 6 | 2
2 | (Russia) A Kuznetsov | 7^{7} | 4 | 6

Semifinals
(Germany) P Torebko | 4 | 3
2 | (Russia) A Kuznetsov | 6 | 6
