= 2021 Meerbusch Challenger – Singles =

Singles
- 2021 Meerbusch Challenger

Final
- Champion: (Chile) Tomás Barrios Vera
- Runner-up: (Argentina) Juan Manuel Cerúndolo
- Score: 7–6^{(9–7)}, 6–3

Events
Singles	Doubles
← 2019 ·	Meerbusch Challenger	· 2022 →

Pedro Sousa was the defending champion but chose not to defend his title.

Marcelo Tomás Barrios Vera won the title after defeating Juan Manuel Cerúndolo 7–6^{(9–7)}, 6–3 in the final.

== Seeds ==
1. (Germany) Daniel Altmaier (quarterfinals)
2. (Bosnia and Herzegovina) Damir Džumhur (second round)
3. (Netherlands) Botic van de Zandschulp (semifinals)
4. (Germany) Oscar Otte (second round)
5. (Argentina) Juan Manuel Cerúndolo (final)
6. (Czech Republic) Tomáš Macháč (first round)
7. (Slovakia) Alex Molčan (withdrew)
8. (India) Sumit Nagal (first round)

== Draw ==
=== Key ===
- Q = Qualifier
- WC = Wild card
- LL = Lucky loser
- Alt = Alternate
- SE = Special exempt
- PR = Protected ranking
- ITF = ITF entry
- JE = Junior exempt
- w/o = Walkover
- r = Retired
- d = Defaulted
- SR = Special ranking

=== Finals ===
Semifinals
(Chile) Marcelo Tomás Barrios Vera	6	4	6
(Netherlands) Robin Haase	3	6	2
3	(Netherlands) Botic van de Zandschulp	5	4
5	(Argentina) Juan Manuel Cerúndolo	7	6

Final
(Chile) Marcelo Tomás Barrios Vera	7^{9}	6
5	(Argentina) Juan Manuel Cerúndolo	6^{7}	3

=== Top half ===
First round
1	(Germany) D Altmaier	6	7
(Chile) A Tabilo	0	5
(Czech Republic) V Kopřiva	7	6
LL	(Bosnia and Herzegovina) N Fatić	5	2
(Spain) N Kuhn	6	6
Q	(Dominican Republic) N Hardt	4	3
(Chile) MT Barrios Vera	7	4	6
8	(India) S Nagal	5	6	3
4	(Germany) O Otte	6	6
WC	(Germany) M Rosenkranz	4	4
Q	(Netherlands) J de Jong	3	7^{7}	4
(Netherlands) R Haase	6	6^{5}	6
Q	(Argentina) N Kicker	6	6
(Argentina) JP Ficovich	4	3
(Germany) M Moraing	7^{7}	6
6	(Czech Republic) T Macháč	6^{0}	3

Second round
1	(Germany) D Altmaier	7^{7}	3	6
(Czech Republic) V Kopřiva	6^{3}	6	3
(Spain) N Kuhn
(Chile) MT Barrios Vera	w/o
4	(Germany) O Otte	6	5	3
(Netherlands) R Haase	3	7	6
Q	(Argentina) N Kicker	4	2
(Germany) M Moraing	6	6

Quarterfinals
1	(Germany) D Altmaier	4	6	6^{4}
(Chile) MT Barrios Vera	6	1	7^{7}
(Netherlands) R Haase	4	6	6
(Germany) M Moraing	6	3	3

Semifinals
(Chile) MT Barrios Vera	6	4	6
(Netherlands) R Haase	3	6	2

=== Bottom half ===
First round
Q	(Croatia) D Ajduković	6	6^{3}	7
WC	(Japan) S Mochizuki	3	7^{7}	5
(Slovakia) L Klein	6	6
(Germany) T Kamke	1	2
(Russia) R Safiullin	4	7^{7}	4
(France) C Lestienne	6	6^{3}	6
(Dominican Republic) R Cid Subervi	6	4	6^{4}
3	(Netherlands) B van de Zandschulp	3	6	7^{7}
5	(Argentina) JM Cerúndolo	2	6	6
(Belgium) K Coppejans	6	2	2
WC	(Germany) R Molleker	6	3	2
(Germany) M Marterer	3	6	6
(Slovakia) F Horanský	6	6
(Argentina) A Collarini	4	2
(Belgium) R Bemelmans	3	3
2	(Bosnia and Herzegovina) D Džumhur	6	6

Second round
Q	(Croatia) D Ajduković	4	6	4
(Slovakia) L Klein	6	4	6
(France) C Lestienne	4	6	4
3	(Netherlands) B van de Zandschulp	6	3	6
5	(Argentina) JM Cerúndolo	6	7^{7}
(Germany) M Marterer	4	6^{3}
(Slovakia) F Horanský	7^{7}	2	6
2	(Bosnia and Herzegovina) D Džumhur	6^{4}	6	2

Quarterfinals
(Slovakia) L Klein	4	6	4
3	(Netherlands) B van de Zandschulp	6	3	6
5	(Argentina) JM Cerúndolo	3	6	7
(Slovakia) F Horanský	6	1	5

Semifinals
3	(Netherlands) B van de Zandschulp	5	4
5	(Argentina) JM Cerúndolo	7	6
