= 2017 Bucher Reisen Tennis Grand Prix =

- Date: 14–20 August
- Edition: 5th
- Draw: 32S/16D
- Surface: Clay
- Location: Meerbusch, Germany

Champions

Singles
- (Spain) Ricardo Ojeda Lara

Doubles
- (Germany) Kevin Krawietz / (Germany) Andreas Mies
← 2016 ·	Bucher Reisen Tennis Grand Prix	· 2018 →

The 2017 Bucher Reisen Tennis Grand Prix was a professional tennis tournament played on clay courts. It was the fifth edition of the tournament which was part of the 2017 ATP Challenger Tour. It took place in Meerbusch, Germany, between 14 and 20 August 2017.

== Singles main draw entrants ==
=== Seeds ===
Country	Player	Rank^{1}	Seed
GER	Florian Mayer	57	1
BEL	Steve Darcis	60	2
GER	Dustin Brown	114	3
BEL	Arthur De Greef	141	4
GER	Oscar Otte	145	5
FRA	Mathias Bourgue	153	6
GER	Jeremy Jahn	201	7
CZE	Václav Šafránek	205	8

- ^{1} Rankings as of 7 August 2017.

=== Other entrants ===
The following players received wildcards into the singles main draw:

- (Germany) Matthias Bachinger
- (Austria) Andreas Haider-Maurer
- (Spain) Nicola Kuhn
- (Germany) Henri Squire

The following players received entry from the qualifying draw:

- (Belgium) Kimmer Coppejans
- (Sweden) Markus Eriksson
- (Brazil) André Ghem
- (Germany) Marc Sieber

== Champions ==
=== Singles ===
- (Spain) Ricardo Ojeda Lara def. (Austria) Andreas Haider-Maurer 6–4, 6–3

=== Doubles ===
- (Germany) Kevin Krawietz / (Germany) Andreas Mies def. (Germany) Dustin Brown / (Croatia) Antonio Šančić 6–1, 7–6^{(7–5)}
