= 2013 Maserati Challenger – Singles =

Singles
- 2013 Maserati Challenger

Final
- Champion: (Czech Republic) Jan Hájek
- Runner-up: (Netherlands) Jesse Huta Galung
- Score: 6–3, 6–4

Events
Singles	Doubles
- Maserati Challenger

This is the first edition of the event. 2nd seed Jan Hájek defeated top seed Jesse Huta Galung in the final.

== Seeds ==
1. (Netherlands) Jesse Huta Galung (final)
2. (Czech Republic) Jan Hájek (champion)
3. (Germany) Simon Greul (quarterfinals)
4. (Spain) Pere Riba (semifinals)
5. (Germany) Dustin Brown (quarterfinals)
6. (Czech Republic) Jan Mertl (withdrew)
7. (Ukraine) Ivan Sergeyev (first round)
8. (Germany) Bastian Knittel (quarterfinals, withdrew)

== Draw ==
Key

- Q = Qualifier
- WC = Wild card
- LL = Lucky loser
- Alt = Alternate
- ITF = ITF entry
- PR = Protected ranking
- SR = Special ranking
- SE = Special exempt
- JE = Junior exempt
- JR = Junior Accelerator Programme entrant
- CO = College Accelerator Programme entrant
- NG = Next Gen Accelerator Program entrant
- w/o = Walkover
- r = Retired
- d = Defaulted

=== Finals ===
Semifinals
1	(Netherlands) Jesse Huta Galung	6	7
4	(Spain) Pere Riba	4	5
(Slovakia) Miloslav Mečíř Jr.	6^{4}	3
2	(Czech Republic) Jan Hájek	7^{7}	6

Final
1	(Netherlands) Jesse Huta Galung	3	4
2	(Czech Republic) Jan Hájek	6	6

=== Top half ===
First round
1	(Netherlands) J Huta Galung	5
(Kazakhstan) E Korolev	0^{r}
Q	(Serbia) M Janković	6	6
(Spain) J Checa Calvo	4	2
(Italy) L Giustino	0	2
(Chile) H Podlipnik-Castillo	6	6
WC	(Slovakia) F Horanský	4	5
LL	(Belgium) Y Mertens	6	7
4	(Spain) P Riba	6	7^{7}
(Austria) G Melzer	3	6^{4}
(Germany) B Phau	3	1
(Belgium) G Gigounon	6	6
(France) A Michon	0	5
(Spain) G Granollers	6	7
Q	(Germany) G Kretschmer	6^{7}	6	5
5	(Germany) D Brown	7^{9}	1	7

Second round
1	(Netherlands) J Huta Galung	6	6
Q	(Serbia) M Janković	2	3
(Chile) H Podlipnik-Castillo	6	3	3
LL	(Belgium) Y Mertens	4	6	6
4	(Spain) P Riba	6	6
(Belgium) G Gigounon	2	2
(Spain) G Granollers	3	0
5	(Germany) D Brown	6	6

Quarterfinals
1	(Netherlands) J Huta Galung	6	6
LL	(Belgium) Y Mertens	4	4
4	(Spain) P Riba	7^{7}	3	6
5	(Germany) D Brown	6^{2}	6	3

Semifinals
1	(Netherlands) J Huta Galung	6	7
4	(Spain) P Riba	4	5

=== Bottom half ===
First round
7	(Ukraine) I Sergeyev	1	2
WC	(Slovakia) P Červenák	6	6
(Serbia) F Krajinović	4	3
(Slovakia) M Mečíř	6	6
Q	(Russia) A Vatutin	1	6	6
(Germany) N Langer	6	3	3
WC	(Germany) R Kern	2	4
3	(Germany) S Greul	6	6
8	(Germany) B Knittel	6	7
(Belgium) Y Reuter	2	5
(Germany) D Meffert	6	7
Q	(Netherlands) Miliaan Niesten	2	5
(Argentina) M González	6	6
WC	(Germany) A Zverev	3	2
(Slovakia) M Semjan	3	4
2	(Czech Republic) J Hájek	6	6

Second round
WC	(Slovakia) P Červenák	1	5
(Slovakia) M Mečíř	6	7
Q	(Russia) A Vatutin	1	3
3	(Germany) S Greul	6	6
8	(Germany) B Knittel	6	3
(Germany) D Meffert	3	1^{r}
(Argentina) M González	1	4
2	(Czech Republic) J Hájek	6	6

Quarterfinals
(Slovakia) M Mečíř	3	6	7
3	(Germany) S Greul	6	4	5
8	(Germany) B Knittel
2	(Czech Republic) J Hájek	w/o

Semifinals
(Slovakia) M Mečíř	6^{4}	3
2	(Czech Republic) J Hájek	7^{7}	6
