= 2018 Meerbusch Challenger – Doubles =

Doubles
- 2018 Meerbusch Challenger

Final
- Champions: (Spain) David Pérez Sanz (Netherlands) Mark Vervoort
- Runners-up: (Poland) Grzegorz Panfil (Ukraine) Volodymyr Uzhylovskyi
- Score: 3–6, 6–4, [10–7]

Events
Singles	Doubles
← 2017 ·	Meerbusch Challenger	· 2019 →

Kevin Krawietz and Andreas Mies were the defending champions but lost in the quarterfinals to David Pérez Sanz and Mark Vervoort.

Pérez Sanz and Vervoort won the title after defeating Grzegorz Panfil and Volodymyr Uzhylovskyi 3–6, 6–4, [10–7] in the final.

== Seeds ==
1. (Germany) Kevin Krawietz / (Germany) Andreas Mies (quarterfinals)
2. (Germany) Andre Begemann / (Germany) Dustin Brown (first round)
3. (Australia) Rameez Junaid / (Netherlands) David Pel (quarterfinals)
4. (Ukraine) Vladyslav Manafov / (Poland) Szymon Walków (quarterfinals)

== Draw ==
=== Key ===
- Q = Qualifier
- WC = Wild card
- LL = Lucky loser
- Alt = Alternate
- SE = Special exempt
- PR = Protected ranking
- ITF = ITF entry
- JE = Junior exempt
- w/o = Walkover
- r = Retired
- d = Defaulted
- SR = Special ranking

First round
1	(Germany) K Krawietz (Germany) A Mies	4	6	[10]
WC	(Germany) H Squire (Germany) L Wessels	6	2	[1]
(Spain) D Pérez Sanz (Netherlands) M Vervoort	6	6
(Spain) S Gutiérrez Ferrol (Spain) B Zapata Miralles	3	2
4	(Ukraine) V Manafov (Poland) S Walków	4	6	[10]
(Uruguay) M Cuevas (Argentina) R Olivo	6	4	[4]
(France) T Lamasine (France) G Sakharov	6^{5}	2
(Russia) T Gabashvili (Spain) D Marrero	7^{7}	6
(France) E Benchetrit (Germany) R Molleker	4	4
(Poland) G Panfil (Ukraine) V Uzhylovskyi	6	6
WC	(Germany) Hermann Gertmann (Germany) Max Hertl	6^{6}	2
3	(Australia) R Junaid (Netherlands) D Pel	7^{8}	6
(Spain) Carlos Boluda-Purkiss (Spain) M Vilella Martínez	w/o
WC	(Germany) D Masur (Austria) S Ofner
(France) M Janvier (Bulgaria) D Kuzmanov	1	6	[10]
2	(Germany) A Begemann (Germany) D Brown	6	2	[2]

Quarterfinals
1	(Germany) K Krawietz (Germany) A Mies	4	6^{2}
(Spain) D Pérez Sanz (Netherlands) M Vervoort	6	7^{7}
4	(Ukraine) V Manafov (Poland) S Walków	3	5
(Russia) T Gabashvili (Spain) D Marrero	6	7
(Poland) G Panfil (Ukraine) V Uzhylovskyi	3	6	[10]
3	(Australia) R Junaid (Netherlands) D Pel	6	4	[7]
(Spain) C Boluda-Purkiss (Spain) M Vilella Martínez	3	2
(France) M Janvier (Bulgaria) D Kuzmanov	6	6

Semifinals
(Spain) D Pérez Sanz (Netherlands) M Vervoort	7	6
(Russia) T Gabashvili (Spain) D Marrero	5	4
(Poland) G Panfil (Ukraine) V Uzhylovskyi	6	6
(France) M Janvier (Bulgaria) D Kuzmanov	3	3

Final
(Spain) D Pérez Sanz (Netherlands) M Vervoort	3	6	[10]
(Poland) G Panfil (Ukraine) V Uzhylovskyi	6	4	[7]
