= 2016 Cittadino Challenger – Doubles =

Doubles
- 2016 Cittadino Challenger

Final
- Champion: (Russia) Mikhail Elgin (Belarus) Andrei Vasilevski
- Runner-up: (Belgium) Sander Gillé (Belgium) Joran Vliegen
- Score: 7–6^{(8–6)}, 6–4

Events
Singles	Doubles
← 2015 ·	Cittadino Challenger	· 2017 →

Dustin Brown and Rameez Junaid were the defending champions but chose not to defend their title.

Mikhail Elgin and Andrei Vasilevski won the title after defeating Sander Gillé and Joran Vliegen 7–6^{(8–6)}, 6–4 in the final.

== Seeds ==
1. (Germany) Gero Kretschmer / (Austria) Tristan-Samuel Weissborn (semifinals)
2. (Russia) Mikhail Elgin / (Belarus) Andrei Vasilevski (champions)
3. (Belarus) Sergey Betov / (Georgia (country)) Aleksandre Metreveli (quarterfinals)
4. (Belgium) Sander Gillé / (Belgium) Joran Vliegen (final)

== Draw ==
=== Key ===
- Q = Qualifier
- WC = Wild card
- LL = Lucky loser
- Alt = Alternate
- SE = Special exempt
- PR = Protected ranking
- ITF = ITF entry
- JE = Junior exempt
- w/o = Walkover
- r = Retired
- d = Defaulted
- SR = Special ranking

First round
(Belgium) Clément Geens (Belgium) G Gigounon	2	6	[10]
(Argentina) JP Paz (Russia) A Vatutin	6	4	[8]
(Canada) S Diez (Spain) R Ortega Olmedo	1	2
(Slovakia) F Horanský (France) Y Jankovits	6	6
WC	(Germany) A Mies (Germany) O Otte	4	6	[10]
(Netherlands) S Arends (Japan) A Santillan	6	4	[4]

Quarterfinals
1	(Germany) G Kretschmer (Austria) T-S Weissborn	w/o
WC	(Belgium) X Malisse (Germany) F Moser
4	(Belgium) S Gillé (Belgium) J Vliegen	6	6
(Belgium) C Geens (Belgium) G Gigounon	3	4
(Slovakia) F Horanský (France) Y Jankovits	6	7^{8}
3	(Belarus) S Betov (Georgia (country)) A Metreveli	4	6^{6}
WC	(Germany) A Mies (Germany) O Otte	3	2
2	(Russia) M Elgin (Belarus) A Vasilevski	6	6

Semifinals
1	(Germany) G Kretschmer (Austria) T-S Weissborn	6^{10}	4
4	(Belgium) S Gillé (Belgium) J Vliegen	7^{12}	6
(Slovakia) F Horanský (France) Y Jankovits	4	4
2	(Russia) M Elgin (Belarus) A Vasilevski	6	6

Final
4	(Belgium) S Gillé (Belgium) J Vliegen	6^{6}	4
2	(Russia) M Elgin (Belarus) A Vasilevski	7^{8}	6
