= 2013 Maserati Challenger – Doubles =

Doubles
- 2013 Maserati Challenger

Final
- Champions: (Australia) Rameez Junaid (Germany) Frank Moser
- Runners-up: (Germany) Dustin Brown (Germany) Philipp Marx
- Score: 6–3, 7–6^{(7–4)}

Events
Singles	Doubles
← 2012 ·	Maserati Challenger	· 2014 →

This is the first edition of the event. Similar to singles, 2nd seeds Rameez Junaid and Frank Moser defeated top seeds Dustin Brown and Philipp Marx to win the title.

== Seeds ==
1. (Germany) Dustin Brown / (Germany) Philipp Marx (final)
2. (Australia) Rameez Junaid / (Germany) Frank Moser (champion)
3. (Germany) Dominik Meffert / (Austria) Philipp Oswald (semifinals)
4. (Australia) Colin Ebelthite / (Chinese Taipei) Lee Hsin-han (semifinals)

== Draw ==
=== Key ===
- Q = Qualifier
- WC = Wild card
- LL = Lucky loser
- Alt = Alternate
- SE = Special exempt
- PR = Protected ranking
- ITF = ITF entry
- JE = Junior exempt
- w/o = Walkover
- r = Retired
- d = Defaulted
- SR = Special ranking

=== Draw ===
First round
1	(Germany) D Brown (Germany) P Marx	6	1	[10]
(Spain) J Checa Calvo (Spain) C Poch-Gradin	2	6	[6]
(Australia) Chris Letcher (Australia) Marious Zelba	2	7	[2]
WC	(France) A Michon (Germany) Ivo Mijic	6	5	[10]
4	(Australia) C Ebelthite (Chinese Taipei) H-h Lee	6	4	[10]
(Germany) G Kretschmer (Germany) A Satschko	4	6	[7]
(Germany) B Knittel (Chile) H Podlipnik-Castillo	6	4	[12]
(Slovakia) P Červenák (Slovakia) M Semjan	3	6	[10]
(Belgium) G Gigounon (Belgium) Y Reuter	1	6^{4}
(Netherlands) W Koolhof (Netherlands) Miliaan Niesten	6	7^{7}
WC	(Germany) Marvin Greven (Netherlands) J Huta Galung	5	2
3	(Germany) D Meffert (Austria) P Oswald	7	6
WC	(Argentina) M González (Argentina) D Junqueira	7^{7}	7^{7}
(Italy) L Giustino (United Kingdom) A Ward	6^{4}	6^{5}
(Finland) H Kontinen (Indonesia) C Rungkat	3	7^{8}	[3]
2	(Australia) R Junaid (Germany) F Moser	6	6^{6}	[10]

Quarterfinals
1	(Germany) D Brown (Germany) P Marx	6	6
(France) A Michon (Germany) I Mijic	4	1
4	(Australia) C Ebelthite (Chinese Taipei) H-h Lee	w/o
(Germany) B Knittel (Chile) H Podlipnik-Castillo
(Netherlands) W Koolhof (Netherlands) M Niesten	3	2
3	(Germany) D Meffert (Austria) P Oswald	6	6
WC	(Argentina) M González (Argentina) D Junqueira	3	6	[4]
2	(Australia) R Junaid (Germany) F Moser	6	3	[10]

Semifinals
1	(Germany) D Brown (Germany) P Marx	6	4	[12]
4	(Australia) C Ebelthite (Chinese Taipei) H-h Lee	3	6	[10]
3	(Germany) D Meffert (Austria) P Oswald	4	4
2	(Australia) R Junaid (Germany) F Moser	6	6

Final
1	(Germany) D Brown (Germany) P Marx	3	6^{4}
2	(Australia) R Junaid (Germany) F Moser	6	7^{7}
