= 2018 Meerbusch Challenger – Singles =

Singles
- 2018 Meerbusch Challenger

Final
- Champion: (Slovakia) Filip Horanský
- Runner-up: (Germany) Jan Choinski
- Score: 6–7^{(7–9)}, 6–3, 6–3

Events
Singles	Doubles
← 2017 ·	Meerbusch Challenger	· 2019 →

Ricardo Ojeda Lara was the defending champion, but chose not to defend his title.

Filip Horanský won the title after defeating Jan Choinski 6–7^{(7–9)}, 6–3, 6–3 in the final.

== Seeds ==
1. (Spain) Sergio Gutiérrez Ferrol (first round)
2. (Portugal) Pedro Sousa (quarterfinals)
3. (Russia) Alexey Vatutin (withdrew)
4. (Austria) Sebastian Ofner (first round)
5. (Russia) Ivan Nedelko (first round)
6. (Slovakia) Filip Horanský (champion)
7. (Belgium) Arthur De Greef (first round)
8. (Germany) Rudolf Molleker (semifinals)

== Draw ==
=== Key ===
- Q = Qualifier
- WC = Wild card
- LL = Lucky loser
- Alt = Alternate
- ITF = ITF entry
- PR = Protected ranking
- SR = Special ranking
- SE = Special exempt
- JE = Junior exempt
- JR = Junior Accelerator Programme entrant
- CO = College Accelerator Programme entrant
- NG = Next Gen Accelerator Program entrant
- w/o = Walkover
- r = Retired
- d = Defaulted

=== Finals ===
Semifinals
(Germany) Jan Choinski	6	6
(Germany) Dustin Brown	4	3
6	(Slovakia) Filip Horanský	7^{7}	6
8	(Germany) Rudolf Molleker	6^{4}	2

Final
(Germany) Jan Choinski	7^{9}	3	3
6	(Slovakia) Filip Horanský	6^{7}	6	6

=== Top half ===
First round
1	(Spain) S Gutiérrez Ferrol	6	3	3
Q	(Belgium) Z Bergs	1	6	6
WC	(Austria) A Haider-Maurer	1	4
(Germany) J Choinski	6	6
(France) E Benchetrit	6	6
PR	(Italy) R Bellotti	2	1
(Spain) B Zapata Miralles	6	6
7	(Belgium) A De Greef	4	2
4	(Austria) S Ofner	4	6	6^{5}
(Germany) D Brown	6	3	7^{7}
LL	(France) A Müller	6	3	7^{7}
(Uruguay) M Cuevas	3	6	6^{5}
(Argentina) R Olivo	6	4	4
WC	(Germany) B Hassan	0	6	6
SE	(Germany) K Krawietz	6	4	7^{7}
5	(Russia) I Nedelko	2	6	6^{3}

Second round
Q	(Belgium) Z Bergs	3	4
(Germany) J Choinski	6	6
(France) E Benchetrit	5	0
(Spain) B Zapata Miralles	7	6
(Germany) D Brown	6	6
LL	(France) A Müller	1	2
WC	(Germany) B Hassan	2	7^{7}	5
SE	(Germany) K Krawietz	6	6^{5}	7

Quarterfinals
(Germany) J Choinski	5	6	6
(Spain) B Zapata Miralles	7	2	1
(Germany) D Brown	6^{5}	6	6
SE	(Germany) K Krawietz	7^{7}	1	2

Semifinals
(Germany) J Choinski	6	6
(Germany) D Brown	4	3

=== Bottom half ===
First round
6	(Slovakia) F Horanský	6	6
(Austria) J Rodionov	4	1
(Italy) F Baldi	1	6^{9}
(Spain) M Vilella Martínez	6	7^{11}
(France) G Sakharov	3	0
(Bulgaria) D Kuzmanov	6	6
(France) M Janvier	1	3
Q	(Spain) N Kuhn	6	6
8	(Germany) R Molleker	6	6
WC	(Czech Republic) O Štyler	3	4
Q	(Germany) Marc Sieber	6^{5}	6	4
(France) J Tatlot	7^{7}	4	6
Q	(Netherlands) J Sels	6	7
(Spain) Carlos Boluda-Purkiss	3	5
WC	(Germany) L Wessels	0	1
2	(Portugal) P Sousa	6	6

Second round
6	(Slovakia) F Horanský	3	6	6
(Spain) M Vilella Martínez	6	3	1
(Bulgaria) D Kuzmanov	4	4
Q	(Spain) N Kuhn	6	6
8	(Germany) R Molleker	7	6
(France) J Tatlot	5	1
Q	(Netherlands) J Sels	3	1
2	(Portugal) P Sousa	6	6

Quarterfinals
6	(Slovakia) F Horanský	6	1	6
Q	(Spain) N Kuhn	4	6	1
8	(Germany) R Molleker	6	6
2	(Portugal) P Sousa	3	2

Semifinals
6	(Slovakia) F Horanský	7^{7}	6
8	(Germany) R Molleker	6^{4}	2
