= 2015 Maserati Challenger – Doubles =

Doubles
- 2015 Maserati Challenger

Final
- Champions: (Germany) Dustin Brown; (Australia) Rameez Junaid
- Runners-up: (Netherlands) Wesley Koolhof; (Netherlands) Matwé Middelkoop
- Score: 6–4, 7–5

Events
Singles	Doubles
← 2014 ·	Maserati Challenger	· 2016 →

Matthias Bachinger and Dominik Meffert are the defending champions, but chose not to participate.

Dustin Brown and Rameez Junaid won the tournament, defeating Wesley Koolhof and Matwé Middelkoop in the final.

== Seeds ==
1. (Belarus) Aliaksandr Bury / (Sweden) Andreas Siljeström (quarterfinals)
2. (Germany) Dustin Brown / (Australia) Rameez Junaid (champions)
3. (Czech Republic) František Čermák / (Germany) Frank Moser (quarterfinals)
4. (Germany) Gero Kretschmer / (Germany) Alexander Satschko (quarterfinals)

== Draw ==
=== Key ===
- Q = Qualifier
- WC = Wild card
- LL = Lucky loser
- Alt = Alternate
- ITF = ITF entry
- PR = Protected ranking
- SR = Special ranking
- SE = Special exempt
- JE = Junior exempt
- JR = Junior Accelerator Programme entrant
- CO = College Accelerator Programme entrant
- NG = Next Gen Accelerator Program entrant
- w/o = Walkover
- r = Retired
- d = Defaulted

First round

Quarterfinals

Semifinals

Final

1
- (Belarus) A Bury
- (Sweden) A Siljeström
6
6

WC
(Germany) Marvin Greven
(Germany) Cornell Wette
0
1

1
- (Belarus) A Bury
- (Sweden) A Siljeström
6
2
[10]

- (Argentina) F Argüello
- (Spain) P Riba
2
3

- (Mexico) C Ramírez
- (Mexico) MÁ Reyes-Varela
4
6
[12]

- (Mexico) C Ramírez
- (Mexico) MÁ Reyes-Varela
6
6

- (Mexico) C Ramírez
- (Mexico) MÁ Reyes-Varela
6^{6}
1

4
- (Germany) G Kretschmer
- (Germany) A Satschko
6
6

- (Netherlands) W Koolhof
- (Netherlands) M Middelkoop
7^{8}
6

- (Republic of Ireland) J Cluskey
- (France) A Sidorenko
2
4

4
- (Germany) G Kretschmer
- (Germany) A Satschko
4
6
[2]

- (Netherlands) S Arends
- (Uruguay) A Behar
3
2

- (Netherlands) W Koolhof
- (Netherlands) M Middelkoop
6
3
[10]

- (Netherlands) W Koolhof
- (Netherlands) M Middelkoop
6
6

- (Netherlands) W Koolhof
- (Netherlands) M Middelkoop
4
5

- (Chinese Taipei) H-y Peng
- (Chile) H Podlipnik Castillo
3
3

2
- (Germany) D Brown
- (Australia) R Junaid
6
7

- (Germany) P Petzschner
- (Germany) T Pütz
6
6

- (Germany) P Petzschner
- (Germany) T Pütz
6
6

PR
- (Germany) D Brands
- (Germany) S Stadler
4
1

3
- (Czech Republic) F Čermák
- (Germany) F Moser
1
4

3
- (Czech Republic) F Čermák
- (Germany) F Moser
6
6

- (Germany) P Petzschner
- (Germany) T Pütz
3
7^{7}
[6]

WC
- (Germany) Kai Breitbach
- (Austria) B Trinker
6
6

2
- (Germany) D Brown
- (Australia) R Junaid
6
6^{2}
[10]

WC
(Argentina) F Coria
(Argentina) T Lipovšek Puches
3
4

WC
- (Germany) K Breitbach
- (Austria) B Trinker
1
5

- (Italy) R Bellotti
- (Austria) D Novak
2
4

2
- (Germany) D Brown
- (Australia) R Junaid
6
7

2
- (Germany) D Brown
- (Australia) R Junaid
6
6
