= 2023 Meerbusch Challenger – Doubles =

Doubles
- 2023 Meerbusch Challenger

Final
- Champions: (France) Manuel Guinard (France) Grégoire Jacq
- Runners-up: (Brazil) Fernando Romboli (Brazil) Marcelo Zormann
- Score: 7–5, 7–6^{(7–3)}

Events
Singles	Doubles
- Meerbusch Challenger

David Pel and Szymon Walków were the defending champions but only Walków chose to defend his title, partnering Tim Sandkaulen. They lost in the first round to Orlando Luz and Sem Verbeek.

Manuel Guinard and Grégoire Jacq won the title after defeating Fernando Romboli and Marcelo Zormann 7–5, 7–6^{(7–3)} in the final.

== Seeds ==
1. (South Korea) Nam Ji-sung / (India) Jeevan Nedunchezhiyan (quarterfinals)
2. (Spain) Sergio Martos Gornés / (Spain) Oriol Roca Batalla (first round)
3. (France) Manuel Guinard / (France) Grégoire Jacq (champions)
4. (Brazil) Fernando Romboli / (Brazil) Marcelo Zormann (final)

== Draw ==
Key

- Q = Qualifier
- WC = Wild card
- LL = Lucky loser
- Alt = Alternate
- ITF = ITF entry
- PR = Protected ranking
- SR = Special ranking
- SE = Special exempt
- JE = Junior exempt
- JR = Junior Accelerator Programme entrant
- CO = College Accelerator Programme entrant
- NG = Next Gen Accelerator Program entrant
- w/o = Walkover
- r = Retired
- d = Defaulted

First round
1	(South Korea) J-s Nam (India) J Nedunchezhiyan	6	4	[14]
(Netherlands) M Hermans (Germany) K Wehnelt	4	6	[12]
(Germany) T Sandkaulen (Poland) S Walków	1	4
(Brazil) O Luz (Netherlands) S Verbeek	6	6
3	(France) M Guinard (France) G Jacq	6	7^{7}
WC	(Colombia) Daniel Salazar (Germany) John Sperle	2	6^{5}
WC	(Germany) T Gentzsch (Germany) Aaron James Williams	4	6^{3}
(Spain) D Rincón (Spain) P Vives Marcos	6	7^{7}
(Turkey) S Ağabigün (Turkey) E Kırkın	3	6	[9]
(Greece) S Sakellaridis (Ukraine) V Uzhylovskyi	6	3	[11]
(France) C Bittoun Kouzmine (India) Parikshit Somani	5	4
4	(Brazil) F Romboli (Brazil) M Zormann	7	6
(Belgium) M Geerts (Argentina) S Rodríguez Taverna	6^{3}	7^{7}	[10]
PR	(Netherlands) G den Ouden (Netherlands) M Houkes	7^{7}	6^{4}	[8]
(Sweden) F Bergevi (Netherlands) M Veldheer	3	7	[10]
2	(Spain) S Martos Gornés (Spain) O Roca Batalla	6	5	[6]

Quarterfinals
1	(South Korea) J-s Nam (India) J Nedunchezhiyan	7^{7}	6^{3}	[10]
(Brazil) O Luz (Netherlands) S Verbeek	6^{3}	7^{7}	[12]
3	(France) M Guinard (France) G Jacq	w/o
(Spain) D Rincón (Spain) P Vives Marcos
(Greece) S Sakellaridis (Ukraine) V Uzhylovskyi	6^{4}	2
4	(Brazil) F Romboli (Brazil) M Zormann	7^{7}	6
(Belgium) M Geerts (Argentina) S Rodríguez Taverna	6	6
(Sweden) F Bergevi (Netherlands) M Veldheer	3	4

Semifinals
(Brazil) O Luz (Netherlands) S Verbeek	6	5	[9]
3	(France) M Guinard (France) G Jacq	3	7	[11]
4	(Brazil) F Romboli (Brazil) M Zormann	6	6
(Belgium) M Geerts (Argentina) S Rodríguez Taverna	3	4

Final
3	(France) M Guinard (France) G Jacq	7	7^{7}
4	(Brazil) F Romboli (Brazil) M Zormann	5	6^{3}
