= 2018 Meerbusch Challenger =

- Date: 13–19 August
- Edition: 6th
- Draw: 32S/16D
- Surface: Clay
- Location: Meerbusch, Germany

Champions

Singles
- (Slovakia) Filip Horanský

Doubles
- (Spain) David Pérez Sanz / (Netherlands) Mark Vervoort
← 2017 ·	Meerbusch Challenger	· 2019 →

The 2018 Meerbusch Challenger was a professional tennis tournament played on clay courts. It was the sixth edition of the tournament which was part of the 2018 ATP Challenger Tour. It took place in Meerbusch, Germany, between 13 and 19 August 2018.

== Singles main draw entrants ==
=== Seeds ===
Country	Player	Rank^{1}	Seed
ESP	Sergio Gutiérrez Ferrol	158	1
POR	Pedro Sousa	166	2
~~RUS~~	~~Alexey Vatutin~~	~~193~~	~~3~~
AUT	Sebastian Ofner	210	4
RUS	Ivan Nedelko	238	5
SVK	Filip Horanský	245	6
BEL	Arthur De Greef	247	7
GER	Rudolf Molleker	251	8

- ^{1} Rankings as of 6 August 2018.

=== Other entrants ===
The following players received wildcards into the singles main draw:

- (Austria) Andreas Haider-Maurer
- (Germany) Benjamin Hassan
- (Czech Republic) Ondřej Štyler
- (Germany) Louis Wessels

The following player received entry into the singles main draw using a protected ranking:

- (Italy) Riccardo Bellotti

The following player received entry into the singles main draw as a special exempt:

- (Germany) Kevin Krawietz

The following players received entry from the qualifying draw:

- (Belgium) Zizou Bergs
- (Spain) Nicola Kuhn
- (Netherlands) Jelle Sels
- (Germany) Marc Sieber

The following player received entry as a lucky loser:

- (France) Alexandre Müller

== Champions ==
=== Singles ===
- (Slovakia) Filip Horanský def. (Germany) Jan Choinski 6–7^{(7–9)}, 6–3, 6–3.

=== Doubles ===
- (Spain) David Pérez Sanz / (Netherlands) Mark Vervoort def. (Poland) Grzegorz Panfil / (Ukraine) Volodymyr Uzhylovskyi 3–6, 6–4, [10–7].
