= 2014 Maserati Challenger – Doubles =

Doubles
- 2014 Maserati Challenger

Final
- Champions: (Germany) Matthias Bachinger (Germany) Dominik Meffert
- Runners-up: (China) Gong Maoxin (Chinese Taipei) Peng Hsien-yin
- Score: 6–3, 3–6, [10–6]

Events
Singles	Doubles
← 2013 ·	Maserati Challenger	· 2015 →

Matthias Bachinger and Dominik Meffert took the title, beating Gong Maoxin and Peng Hsien-yin 6–3, 3–6, [10–6]

== Seeds ==
1. (Germany) Philipp Marx / (Sweden) Andreas Siljeström (first round)
2. (Germany) Martin Emmrich / (Germany) Gero Kretschmer (quarterfinals)
3. (Poland) Tomasz Bednarek / (Slovakia) Igor Zelenay (quarterfinals)
4. (China) Gong Maoxin / (Chinese Taipei) Peng Hsien-yin (final)

== Draw ==
=== Key ===
- Q = Qualifier
- WC = Wild card
- LL = Lucky loser
- Alt = Alternate
- SE = Special exempt
- PR = Protected ranking
- ITF = ITF entry
- JE = Junior exempt
- w/o = Walkover
- r = Retired
- d = Defaulted
- SR = Special ranking

=== Draw ===
First round
1	(Germany) P Marx (Sweden) A Siljeström	5	2
(Germany) N Langer (Germany) P Torebko	7	6
WC	(Czech Republic) J Hájek (Czech Republic) Jan Masik
(Republic of Ireland) J Cluskey (Mexico) MÁ Reyes-Varela	w/o
4	(China) G Maoxin (Chinese Taipei) H-y Peng	4	7	[10]
(Moldova) R Albot (Bosnia and Herzegovina) A Šetkić	6	5	[5]
WC	(Germany) Kai Breitbach (Netherlands) J Huta Galung	2	1
(Australia) R Junaid (Netherlands) M Middelkoop	6	6
(Netherlands) A van der Duim (Netherlands) B Westerhof	w/o
(Canada) S Diez (Spain) Marc Giner
WC	(Germany) C Kas (Germany) Christian Miele	2	5
3	(Poland) T Bednarek (Slovakia) I Zelenay	6	7
(Germany) M Bachinger (Germany) D Meffert	6	6
(Belgium) A De Greef (France) T Lamasine	4	4
Alt	(Austria) Lukas Jastraunig (Austria) N Reissig	0	2
2	(Germany) M Emmrich (Germany) G Kretschmer	6	6

Quarterfinals
(Germany) N Langer (Germany) P Torebko	6	4	[9]
(Republic of Ireland) J Cluskey (Mexico) MÁ Reyes-Varela	3	6	[11]
4	(China) G Maoxin (Chinese Taipei) H-y Peng	4	7	[10]
(Australia) R Junaid (Netherlands) M Middelkoop	6	5	[5]
(Netherlands) A van der Duim (Netherlands) B Westerhof	7^{7}	3	[10]
3	(Poland) T Bednarek (Slovakia) I Zelenay	6^{4}	6	[5]
(Germany) M Bachinger (Germany) D Meffert	6	6
2	(Germany) M Emmrich (Germany) G Kretschmer	2	3

Semifinals
(Republic of Ireland) J Cluskey (Mexico) MÁ Reyes-Varela	6	5	[9]
4	(China) G Maoxin (Chinese Taipei) H-y Peng	4	7	[11]
(Netherlands) A van der Duim (Netherlands) B Westerhof	5	4
(Germany) M Bachinger (Germany) D Meffert	7	6

Final
4	(China) G Maoxin (Chinese Taipei) H-y Peng	3	6	[6]
(Germany) M Bachinger (Germany) D Meffert	6	3	[10]
