= 2014 Maserati Challenger =

- Date: 11–17 August
- Edition: 2nd
- Draw: 32S/16D
- Prize money: €35,000+H
- Surface: Clay
- Location: Meerbusch, Germany

Champions

Singles
- (Slovakia) Jozef Kovalík

Doubles
- (Germany) Matthias Bachinger / (Germany) Dominik Meffert
- Maserati Challenger

The 2014 Maserati Challenger was a professional tennis tournament played on clay courts. It was the second edition of the tournament which was part of the 2014 ATP Challenger Tour. It took taking place in Meerbusch, Germany, between 11 and 17 August 2014.

== Entrants ==
=== Seeds ===
Country	Player	Rank^{1}	Seed
ESP	Albert Ramos	93	1
RUS	Andrey Kuznetsov	108	2
AUT	Andreas Haider-Maurer	116	3
GER	Julian Reister	124	4
AUT	Gerald Melzer	146	5
NED	Jesse Huta Galung	192	6
MDA	Radu Albot	211	7
CHI	Hans Podlipnik-Castillo	223	8

- ^{1} Rankings as of 4 August 2014

=== Other entrants ===
The following players received wildcards into the singles main draw:

- (Hungary) Attila Balázs
- (Slovakia) Jozef Kovalík
- (Germany) Philipp Petzschner
- (Germany) Jan Oliver Sadlowski

The following players received entry from the qualifying draw:

- (Russia) Philipp Davydenko
- (Chile) Christian Garin
- (France) Laurent Lokoli
- (Germany) Matthias Wunner

== Champions ==
=== Singles ===
- (Slovakia) Jozef Kovalík def. (Russia) Andrey Kuznetsov 6–1, 6–4

=== Doubles ===
- (Germany) Matthias Bachinger / (Germany) Dominik Meffert def. (China) Gong Maoxin / (Chinese Taipei) Peng Hsien-yin 6–3, 3–6, [10–6]
