= 2015 Maserati Challenger =

- Date: 17–23 August
- Edition: 3rd
- Draw: 32S/16D
- Prize money: €35,000+H
- Surface: Clay
- Location: Meerbusch, Germany

Champions

Singles
- (Austria) Andreas Haider-Maurer

Doubles
- (Germany) Dustin Brown / (Australia) Rameez Junaid
- Maserati Challenger

The 2015 Maserati Challenger was a professional tennis tournament played on clay courts. It was the second edition of the tournament which was part of the 2015 ATP Challenger Tour. It took place in Meerbusch, Germany, between 17 and 23 August 2015.

== Entrants ==
=== Seeds ===
| Country | Player | Rank^{1} | Seed |
|---|---|---|---|
| AUT | Andreas Haider-Maurer | 59 | 1 |
| GER | Dustin Brown | 83 | 2 |
| ARG | Facundo Argüello | 145 | 3 |
| ARG | Carlos Berlocq | 151 | 4 |
| CHI | Hans Podlipnik | 157 | 5 |
| KAZ | Andrey Golubev | 162 | 6 |
| ESP | Jordi Samper-Montaña | 208 | 7 |
| ROU | Victor Hănescu | 223 | 8 |

- ^{1} Rankings as of 10 August 2015

=== Other entrants ===
The following players received wildcards into the singles main draw:

- (Serbia) Pavle Daljev
- (Germany) Marvin Greven
- (Germany) Philipp Petzschner
- (Austria) Bastian Trinker

The following players received entry from the qualifying draw:

- (Russia) Philipp Davydenko
- (France) Sadio Doumbia
- (Belgium) Michael Geerts
- (Belgium) Yannik Reuter

== Champions ==
=== Singles ===
- (Austria) Andreas Haider-Maurer def. (Argentina) Carlos Berlocq 6–2, 6–4

=== Doubles ===
- (Germany) Dustin Brown / (Australia) Rameez Junaid def. (Netherlands) Wesley Koolhof / (Netherlands) Matwé Middelkoop 6–4, 7–5
