= 2023 Meerbusch Challenger – Singles =

Singles
- 2023 Meerbusch Challenger

Final
- Champion: (United Kingdom) Jan Choinski
- Runner-up: (Argentina) Camilo Ugo Carabelli
- Score: 6–4, 6–0

Events
Singles	Doubles
- Meerbusch Challenger

Bernabé Zapata Miralles was the defending champion but chose not to defend his title.

Jan Choinski won the title after defeating Camilo Ugo Carabelli 6–4, 6–0 in the final.

== Seeds ==
1. (Austria) Jurij Rodionov (first round)
2. (United Kingdom) Jan Choinski (champion)
3. (India) Sumit Nagal (second round)
4. (France) Titouan Droguet (semifinals)
5. (Argentina) Camilo Ugo Carabelli (final)
6. (Bulgaria) Dimitar Kuzmanov (quarterfinals)
7. (Ukraine) Oleksii Krutykh (withdrew)
8. (Belgium) Gauthier Onclin (second round)

== Draw ==
Key

- Q = Qualifier
- WC = Wild card
- LL = Lucky loser
- Alt = Alternate
- ITF = ITF entry
- PR = Protected ranking
- SR = Special ranking
- SE = Special exempt
- JE = Junior exempt
- JR = Junior Accelerator Programme entrant
- CO = College Accelerator Programme entrant
- NG = Next Gen Accelerator Program entrant
- w/o = Walkover
- r = Retired
- d = Defaulted

=== Finals ===
Semifinals
(France) Manuel Guinard	6^{5}	0
5	(Argentina) Camilo Ugo Carabelli	7^{7}	6
4	(France) Titouan Droguet	1	4
2	(United Kingdom) Jan Choinski	6	6

Final
5	(Argentina) Camilo Ugo Carabelli	4	0
2	(United Kingdom) Jan Choinski	6	6

=== Top half ===
First round
1	(Austria) J Rodionov	4	2
(Germany) H Squire	6	6
(France) M Guinard	6	5	6
Q	(Brazil) O Luz	4	7	3
(Switzerland) K Feldbausch	7	6
(Netherlands) M Houkes	5	4
(Spain) D Rincón	6	6
Q	(United Kingdom) F Gill	4	2
3	(India) S Nagal	6	6
(Argentina) S Rodríguez Taverna	3	3
(Lebanon) B Hassan	7^{7}	6
(Switzerland) H Laaksonen	6^{3}	1
Q	(Turkey) E Kırkın	6	7^{7}
(Germany) R Molleker	4	6^{3}
Q	(Belgium) T Colson	2	2
5	(Argentina) C Ugo Carabelli	6	6

Second round
(Germany) H Squire	4	4
(France) M Guinard	6	6
(Switzerland) K Feldbausch	2	1
(Spain) D Rincón	6	6
3	(India) S Nagal	2	2
(Lebanon) B Hassan	6	6
Q	(Turkey) E Kırkın	1	4
5	(Argentina) C Ugo Carabelli	6	6

Quarterfinals
(France) M Guinard	7^{7}	6
(Spain) D Rincón	6^{0}	1
(Lebanon) B Hassan	6^{2}	6	2
5	(Argentina) C Ugo Carabelli	7^{7}	1	6

Semifinals
(France) M Guinard	6^{5}	0
5	(Argentina) C Ugo Carabelli	7^{7}	6

=== Bottom half ===
First round
8	(Belgium) G Onclin	2	7	6
SE	(South Korea) G Campaña Lee	6	5	1
WC	(Germany) MH Rehberg	2	6	6
(Poland) D Michalski	6	1	4
Q	(Czech Republic) M Krumich	7^{7}	5	4
(Kazakhstan) D Yevseyev	6^{3}	7	6
Q	(Netherlands) G den Ouden	4	2
4	(France) T Droguet	6	6
6	(Bulgaria) D Kuzmanov	6	6
(Spain) O Roca Batalla	2	4
(Belgium) M Geerts	7	6^{3}	6
WC	(Germany) M Möller	5	7^{7}	4
LL	(Spain) M Damas	4	2
Alt	(Germany) L Wessels	6	6
WC	(Germany) N Kuhn	6^{4}	4
2	(United Kingdom) J Choinski	7^{7}	6

Second round
8	(Belgium) G Onclin	6^{4}	6^{4}
WC	(Germany) MH Rehberg	7^{7}	7^{7}
(Kazakhstan) D Yevseyev	1	3
4	(France) T Droguet	6	6
6	(Bulgaria) D Kuzmanov	7	6
(Belgium) M Geerts	5	3
Alt	(Germany) L Wessels	2	7^{7}	6^{5}
2	(United Kingdom) J Choinski	6	6^{0}	7^{7}

Quarterfinals
WC	(Germany) MH Rehberg	6^{6}	4
4	(France) T Droguet	7^{8}	6
6	(Bulgaria) D Kuzmanov	6	5	3
2	(United Kingdom) J Choinski	2	7	6

Semifinals
4	(France) T Droguet	1	4
2	(United Kingdom) J Choinski	6	6
