= 2023 Meerbusch Challenger =

- Date: 7–13 August
- Edition: 10th
- Surface: Clay
- Location: Meerbusch, Germany

Champions

Singles
- (United Kingdom) Jan Choinski

Doubles
- (France) Manuel Guinard / (France) Grégoire Jacq
- Meerbusch Challenger

The 2023 Rhein Asset Open was a professional tennis tournament played on clay courts. It was the 10th edition of the tournament which was part of the 2023 ATP Challenger Tour. It took place in Meerbusch, Germany, between 7 and 13 August 2023.

== Singles main draw entrants ==
=== Seeds ===
Country	Player	Rank^{1}	Seed
AUT	Jurij Rodionov	107	1
GBR	Jan Choinski	148	2
IND	Sumit Nagal	179	3
FRA	Titouan Droguet	180	4
ARG	Camilo Ugo Carabelli	182	5
BUL	Dimitar Kuzmanov	201	6
~~UKR~~	~~Oleksii Krutykh~~	~~207~~	~~7~~
BEL	Gauthier Onclin	208	8

- ^{1} Rankings as of 31 July 2023.

=== Other entrants ===
The following players received wildcards into the singles main draw:

- (Germany) Nicola Kuhn
- (Germany) Marvin Möller
- (Germany) Max Hans Rehberg

The following player received entry into the singles main draw as a special exempt:

- (South Korea) Gerard Campaña Lee

The following player received entry into the singles main draw as an alternate:

- (Germany) Louis Wessels

The following players received entry from the qualifying draw:

- (Belgium) Tibo Colson
- (Netherlands) Guy den Ouden
- (United Kingdom) Felix Gill
- (Turkey) Ergi Kırkın
- (Czech Republic) Martin Krumich
- (Brazil) Orlando Luz

The following player received entry as a lucky loser:

- (Spain) Miguel Damas

== Champions ==
=== Singles ===
- (United Kingdom) Jan Choinski def. (Argentina) Camilo Ugo Carabelli 6–4, 6–0.

=== Doubles ===
- (France) Manuel Guinard / (France) Grégoire Jacq def. (Brazil) Fernando Romboli / (Brazil) Marcelo Zormann 7–5, 7–6^{(7–3)}.
