= Ekaterina Moré =

Russian artist

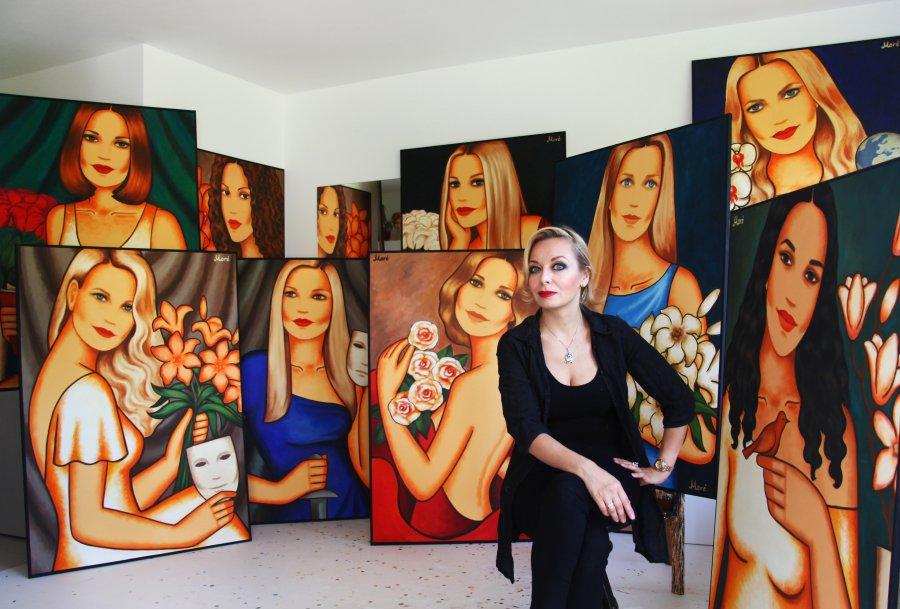
- Born: 1976 (age 49–50); Leningrad, Soviet Union (now Saint Petersburg, Russia)
- Known for: Painting
- Style: Human PO-sitive P-ainting
- Website: ekaterina-more.com

Ekaterina Moré is a self-taught Russian painter based in Meerbusch, Germany. Her work focuses on women in the modern world. Her style is influenced by Post-Impressionism and Pop-art.

== Early life and education ==
In 1976, Moré was born in Saint Petersburg, Russia to a family of artists. She was raised on the Kamchatka Peninsula and Vladivostok, Russia. In 1990, Moré moved back to Saint Petersburg to finish her education. From 1993 to 1995, Moré studied law in Saint Petersburg. She moved to Rhineland, Germany in 1995.

== Career ==
Moré published her first book, Ekaterina Moré: Bilder aus den Jahren 2003-2004, in August 2004. Rosenthal, a German porcelain manufacturer, partnered with Moré to create china collections the following year. In 2005, her work was displayed in Conzen, Andreas Baumgartl, and Art Gallery Wiesbaden, three renown German galleries. Her work was also used to furnish the Maritim Hotel bar in Berlin, Germany that year. Moré published her second book, Entgegengehen- Macht und Mythos Frau in May 2006. Ten percent of the book's proceeds were donated to the Hannelore Kohl Foundation, a charity founded by Hannelore Kohl to help victims of trauma-induced injuries to the central nervous system. She created a second collection for Rosenthal in 2006. In 2007, Moré created paintings for the Steigenberger Parkhotel in Düsseldorf, Germany. She traveled to India the following year to study the roles of women in foreign cultures.

In 2010, Moré partnered with Lilia Sabantina, a fashion designer, to create a wedding dress. She also collaborated with Carlo Staudt, a furniture designer to create a dresser that year. She contributed to the Colorful Emotions: Art in Glass project by painting on glass objects and doors in 2012. Moré painted Jenny Jürgens, a German actress, in December 2013.

=== Berlin Wall ===
She has painted a piece of the remaining Berlin Wall located by Checkpoint Charlie with the theme "Fire and Water."

=== Modern Muses 2014 ===
In 2014, Moré painted nine female celebrities as a charity project for the Tribute to Bambi Foundation, a charity that helps sick children. Each woman represented a different element of femininity. The celebrities included Annabelle Mandeng, Regina Halmich, Tina Ruland, Sonja Kiefer, Valerie Niehaus, Xenia Seeberg, Tanja Bülter, Cassandra Steen and Jenny Jürgens.

=== Style ===
The focus of Moré's paintings are women in the modern world. She uses prismatic and bright colors to create images of "long-haired women with optimism and joy." Moré also uses Cloisonné to manipulate the perspective in her paintings. She works in Human PO-sitive P-ainting, an art style developed from Pop-art.

=== Exhibits and displays ===
- BB International Fine Arts Geneva, Switzerland
- Meyer Gallery Berlin, Germany (April/May 2002)
- Monaco Art Gallery's Collection Düsseldorf, Germany (April 2002)
- Kunsthaus OberkasselOberkassel, Germany (September 2005)
- Augustin Gallery Vienna, Austria (2006/June 2007)
- Modus Gallery Paris France (September 2007)
- F.G. Conzen Gallery Düsseldorf, Germany (December 2007)
- CityLoftArt Miami, Florida (October 2009)
- Hof Gallery Sylt, Germany (June/September 2010)
- Burgauer Gallery Burgau, Germany (October/November 2012)
- Udo Lindenberg & more Gallery, Hamburg
- Kunsthaus Schill, Stuttgart
- AIDA Galleries

=== Art fairs ===
- Europ' Art Geneva, Geneva / Switzerland
- Art Innsbruck / Austria
- Art Manege, Moscow / Russia
- Lineart, Gent/Belgium

== Personal life ==
Moré lives in Meerbusch, Germany with her husband and daughter.

== Bibliography ==
- Ekaterina Moré: Bilder aus den Jahren 2003-2004 (August 2004) (ISBN 3000141022)
- Kunstwerke für Schulen / Band 1 (2005) (ISBN 978-3-86632-234-9)
- Entgegengehen- Macht und Mythos Frau (May 2006) (ISBN 3000181644)
- Sensuality (2009) (ISBN 3000287418)
- Frauen in der Kunst: Zeitgenössische Acrylmalerei (November 2011) (ISBN 3862300900)
