= 2022 Meerbusch Challenger – Doubles =

Doubles
- 2022 Meerbusch Challenger

Final
- Champions: (Netherlands) David Pel (Poland) Szymon Walków
- Runners-up: (Austria) Neil Oberleitner (Austria) Philipp Oswald
- Score: 7–5, 6–1

Events
Singles	Doubles
- Meerbusch Challenger

Szymon Walków and Jan Zieliński were the defending champions but only Walków chose to defend his title, partnering David Pel. Walków successfully defended his title, defeating Neil Oberleitner and Philipp Oswald 7–5, 6–1 in the final.

== Seeds ==
1. (Netherlands) David Pel / (Poland) Szymon Walków (champions)
2. (Jamaica) Dustin Brown / (Austria) Alexander Erler (first round)
3. (India) Sriram Balaji / (India) Jeevan Nedunchezhiyan (semifinals)
4. (Austria) Neil Oberleitner / (Austria) Philipp Oswald (final)

== Draw ==
Key

- Q = Qualifier
- WC = Wild card
- LL = Lucky loser
- Alt = Alternate
- ITF = ITF entry
- PR = Protected ranking
- SR = Special ranking
- SE = Special exempt
- JE = Junior exempt
- JR = Junior Accelerator Programme entrant
- CO = College Accelerator Programme entrant
- NG = Next Gen Accelerator Program entrant
- w/o = Walkover
- r = Retired
- d = Defaulted

First round
1	(Netherlands) D Pel (Poland) S Walków	7	4	[10]
(Germany) Lucas Gerch (Germany) H Squire	5	6	[7]
(Germany) F Fallert (Germany) H Jebens	6	7
Alt	(Ukraine) O Krutykh (Kazakhstan) D Yevseyev	4	5
3	(India) S Balaji (India) J Nedunchezhiyan	7	6
(Poland) K Drzewiecki (Finland) P Niklas-Salminen	5	3
Alt	(Czech Republic) J Pospíšil (Ukraine) V Uzhylovskyi	6^{1}	6	[10]
(Uzbekistan) S Fayziev (Netherlands) M Hermans	7^{7}	2	[5]
WC	(Germany) C Frantzen (Germany) R Molleker	7^{7}	6
(France) T Arribagé (France) L Sanchez	6^{3}	2
WC	(Belgium) K Coppejans (Germany) John Sperle	3	2
4	(Austria) N Oberleitner (Austria) P Oswald	6	6
(Bulgaria) A Andreev; A Vatutin	0	3
PR	(Czech Republic) J Forejtek (India) S Nagal	6	6
(Sweden) F Bergevi (Bulgaria) A Donski	6	7^{8}
2	(Jamaica) D Brown (Austria) A Erler	4	6^{6}

Quarterfinals
1	(Netherlands) D Pel (Poland) S Walków	6	7
(Germany) F Fallert (Germany) H Jebens	3	5
3	(India) S Balaji (India) J Nedunchezhiyan	6	6
Alt	(Czech Republic) J Pospíšil (Ukraine) V Uzhylovskyi	4	1
WC	(Germany) C Frantzen (Germany) R Molleker	3	2
4	(Austria) N Oberleitner (Austria) P Oswald	6	6
PR	(Czech Republic) J Forejtek (India) S Nagal	6	6
(Sweden) F Bergevi (Bulgaria) A Donski	4	4

Semifinals
1	(Netherlands) D Pel (Poland) S Walków	6	6^{5}	[10]
3	(India) S Balaji (India) J Nedunchezhiyan	4	7^{7}	[6]
4	(Austria) N Oberleitner (Austria) P Oswald	6	6
PR	(Czech Republic) J Forejtek (India) S Nagal	2	4

Final
1	(Netherlands) D Pel (Poland) S Walków	7	6
4	(Austria) N Oberleitner (Austria) P Oswald	5	1
