= 2015 Maserati Challenger – Singles =

Singles
- 2015 Maserati Challenger

Final
- Champion: (Austria) Andreas Haider-Maurer
- Runner-up: (Argentina) Carlos Berlocq
- Score: 6–2, 6–4

Events
Singles	Doubles
- Maserati Challenger

Jozef Kovalík was the defending champion, but did not participate this year.

Andreas Haider-Maurer won the tournament, defeating Carlos Berlocq in the final.

== Seeds ==
1. (Austria) Andreas Haider-Maurer (champion)
2. (Germany) Dustin Brown (second round)
3. (Argentina) Facundo Argüello (semifinals)
4. (Argentina) Carlos Berlocq (final)
5. (Chile) Hans Podlipnik-Castillo (second round)
6. (Kazakhstan) Andrey Golubev (second round)
7. (Spain) Jordi Samper-Montaña (second round)
8. (Romania) Victor Hănescu (quarterfinals)

== Draw ==
Key

- Q = Qualifier
- WC = Wild card
- LL = Lucky loser
- Alt = Alternate
- ITF = ITF entry
- PR = Protected ranking
- SR = Special ranking
- SE = Special exempt
- JE = Junior exempt
- JR = Junior Accelerator Programme entrant
- CO = College Accelerator Programme entrant
- NG = Next Gen Accelerator Program entrant
- w/o = Walkover
- r = Retired
- d = Defaulted

=== Finals ===
Semifinals
1	(Austria) Andreas Haider-Maurer	6	6
3	(Argentina) Facundo Argüello	4	4
4	(Argentina) Carlos Berlocq	6	6
(Spain) Pere Riba	3	3

Final
1	(Austria) Andreas Haider-Maurer	6	6
4	(Argentina) Carlos Berlocq	2	4

=== Top half ===
First round
1	(Austria) A Haider-Maurer	7	5	6
Q	(Russia) P Davydenko	5	7	1
(France) A Musialek	5	6^{1}
(Argentina) M Trungelliti	7	7^{7}
Q	(Belgium) Y Reuter	6	6
(Poland) G Panfil	1	0
(Belgium) A De Greef	6^{5}	0
5	(Chile) H Podlipnik-Castillo	7^{7}	6
3	(Argentina) F Argüello	6	7
WC	(Germany) Marvin Greven	2	5
(Chile) JC Sáez	6	6
(Austria) D Novak	1	2
Q	(Belgium) M Geerts	4	3
Q	(France) S Doumbia	6	6
(Bosnia and Herzegovina) A Šetkić	6^{2}	3
8	(Romania) V Hănescu	7^{7}	6

Second round
1	(Austria) A Haider-Maurer	7	6
(Argentina) M Trungelliti	5	1
Q	(Belgium) Y Reuter	6	7^{7}
5	(Chile) H Podlipnik-Castillo	1	6^{4}
3	(Argentina) F Argüello	6	6
(Chile) JC Sáez	3	2
Q	(France) S Doumbia	7^{7}	4	0
8	(Romania) V Hănescu	6^{3}	6	6

Quarterfinals
1	(Austria) A Haider-Maurer	6	7^{7}
Q	(Belgium) Y Reuter	3	6^{4}
3	(Argentina) F Argüello	6	6
8	(Romania) V Hănescu	3	4

Semifinals
1	(Austria) A Haider-Maurer	6	6
3	(Argentina) F Argüello	4	4

=== Bottom half ===
First round
6	(Kazakhstan) A Golubev	6	6
WC	(Serbia) Pavle Daljev	1	2
(Germany) D Brands	3	6	6
(Estonia) V Ivanov	6	3	2
(Belgium) J Cagnina	2	6	3
(Chile) C Garin	6	3	6
(Germany) T Pütz	6	4	2
4	(Argentina) C Berlocq	4	6	6
7	(Spain) J Samper-Montaña	6	7^{7}
WC	(Germany) P Petzschner	3	6^{2}
(Belarus) M Dubarenco	4	3
(Spain) P Riba	6	6
(Czech Republic) M Michalička	6	2	7^{7}
WC	(Austria) B Trinker	2	6	6^{2}
(Italy) R Bellotti	4	2
2	(Germany) D Brown	6	6

Second round
6	(Kazakhstan) A Golubev	6	3	1
(Germany) D Brands	4	6	6
(Chile) C Garin	4	3
4	(Argentina) C Berlocq	6	6
7	(Spain) J Samper-Montaña	2	3
(Spain) P Riba	6	6
(Czech Republic) M Michalička	2	6	6
2	(Germany) D Brown	6	3	1

Quarterfinals
(Germany) D Brands	3	2
4	(Argentina) C Berlocq	6	6
(Spain) P Riba	7	6
(Czech Republic) M Michalička	5	3

Semifinals
4	(Argentina) C Berlocq	6	6
(Spain) P Riba	3	3
