= Karim-Mohamed Maamoun =

Egyptian tennis player

- Full name: Karim-Mohamed Maamoun
- Country (sports): Egypt
- Residence: Cairo, Egypt
- Born: 9 April 1991 (age 35) Cairo, Egypt
- Height: 1.75 m (5 ft 9 in)
- Plays: Right-handed (two-handed backhand)
- Prize money: $192,680

Singles
- Career record: 4–6 (at ATP Tour level, Grand Slam level, and in Davis Cup)
- Career titles: 0
- Highest ranking: No. 225 (2 October 2017)
- Current ranking: No. 1,703 (10 November 2025)

Grand Slam singles results
- Australian Open: Q2 (2018)

Doubles
- Career record: 0–1 (at ATP Tour level, Grand Slam level, and in Davis Cup)
- Career titles: 0
- Highest ranking: No. 224 (13 June 2016)
- Current ranking: No. 2,487 (10 November 2025)
- Last updated on: 10 November 2025.

Karim-Mohamed Maamoun (born 9 April 1991 in Cairo) is an Egyptian tennis player. Maamoun has a career high ATP singles ranking of No. 225 achieved on 2 October 2017. Maamoun has represented Egypt at the Davis Cup where he has a W/L record of 17–9.

== Singles titles ==
Legend (singles)
ATP Challenger Tour (0)
Futures/World Tennis Tour (19)

No.	Date	Tournament	Surface	Opponent	Score
1.	7 February 2016	Egypt F3, Egypt	Hard	(Serbia) Nikola Milojević	7–6^{(7–5)}, 2–6, 6–4
2.	27 March 2016	Egypt F10, Egypt	Hard	(France) Gleb Sakharov	6–4, 4–6, 7–5
3.	4 September 2016	Egypt F22, Egypt	Hard	(Tunisia) Anis Ghorbel	6–3, 6–1
4.	5 February 2017	Egypt F3, Egypt	Hard	(Bosnia and Herzegovina) Aldin Setkic	6–2, 7–6^{(7–5)}
5.	19 February 2017	Egypt F5, Egypt	Hard	(Ukraine) Artem Smirnov	6–4, 6–2
6.	5 March 2017	Egypt F7, Egypt	Hard	(Slovakia) Alex Molcan	6–0, 6–3
7.	26 March 2017	Egypt F10, Egypt	Hard	(Czech Republic) Marek Gengel	6–4, 6–2
8.	2 April 2017	Egypt F11, Egypt	Hard	(Czech Republic) Marek Gengel	6–4, 3–6, 6–4
9.	21 October 2018	Egypt F23, Egypt	Hard	(United Kingdom) Neil Pauffley	6–3, 6–4
10.	28 October 2018	Egypt F24, Egypt	Hard	(Austria) Alexander Erler	4–6, 6–1, 6–4
11.	27 January 2019	M15 Sharm El Sheikh, Egypt	Hard	(Spain) Pablo Vivero González	6–7^{(3–7)}, 6–3, 6–4
12.	3 February 2019	M15 Sharm El Sheikh, Egypt	Hard	(United States) Peter Kobelt	6–1, 7–6^{(7–2)}
13.	10 February 2019	M15 Sharm El Sheikh, Egypt	Hard	(France) Laurent Lokoli	6–3, 6–1
14.	21 April 2019	M15 Cairo, Egypt	Clay	(Switzerland) Adam Moundir	6–4, 6–2
15.	20 October 2019	M15 Sharm El Sheikh, Egypt	Hard	(Czech Republic) Marek Gengel	6–4, 4–6, 6–4
16.	10 November 2019	M15 Sharm El Sheikh, Egypt	Hard	(Spain) Pablo Vivero González	6–3, 7–5
17.	17 November 2019	M15 Sharm El Sheikh, Egypt	Hard	(Russia) Alexey Zakharov	6–7^{(2–7)}, 6–3, 6–4
18.	1 March 2020	M15 Sharm El Sheikh, Egypt	Hard	(Czech Republic) David Poljak	7–5, 6–3
19.	23 July 2023	M25 Brazzaville, Congo Republic	Clay	(United States) Alexander Stater	7–5, 6–2

== Doubles titles ==
Legend
ATP Challenger Tour (0)
Futures (6)

No.	Date	Tournament	Surface	Partnering	Opponent	Score
1.	24 February 2014	Sharm El Sheikh, F7	Clay	(Colombia) Christian Rodriguez	(Brazil) Alex Blumenberg (Brazil) Lucas Guitarrari	6–3, 6–3
2.	9 June 2014	Sharm El Sheikh, F21	Clay	(Syria) Issam Haitham Taweel	(Italy) Francesco Picco (Netherlands) Mark Vervoort	4–6, 6–1, [10–4]
3.	26 January 2015	Sharm El Sheikh, F3	Clay	(Syria) Issam Haitham Taweel	(Serbia) Ilija Vučić (France) Tak Khunn Wang	6–2, 6–3
4.	4 May 2015	Sharm El Sheikh, F17	Clay	(Egypt) Sherif Sabry	(Turkey) Barış Ergüden (Turkey) Cem İlkel	6–4, 6–2
5.	15 June 2015	Sharm El Sheikh, F23	Clay	(Spain) David Perez Sanz	(Egypt) Mohamed Safwat (Syria) Issam Haitham Taweel	7–5, 6–3
6.	13 July 2015	Kassel, F7	Clay	(Bulgaria) Alexsandar Lazov	(Netherlands) Sander Arends (Australia) Adam Hubble	6–2, 5–7, 10–8
