= Meerbusch =

- Town
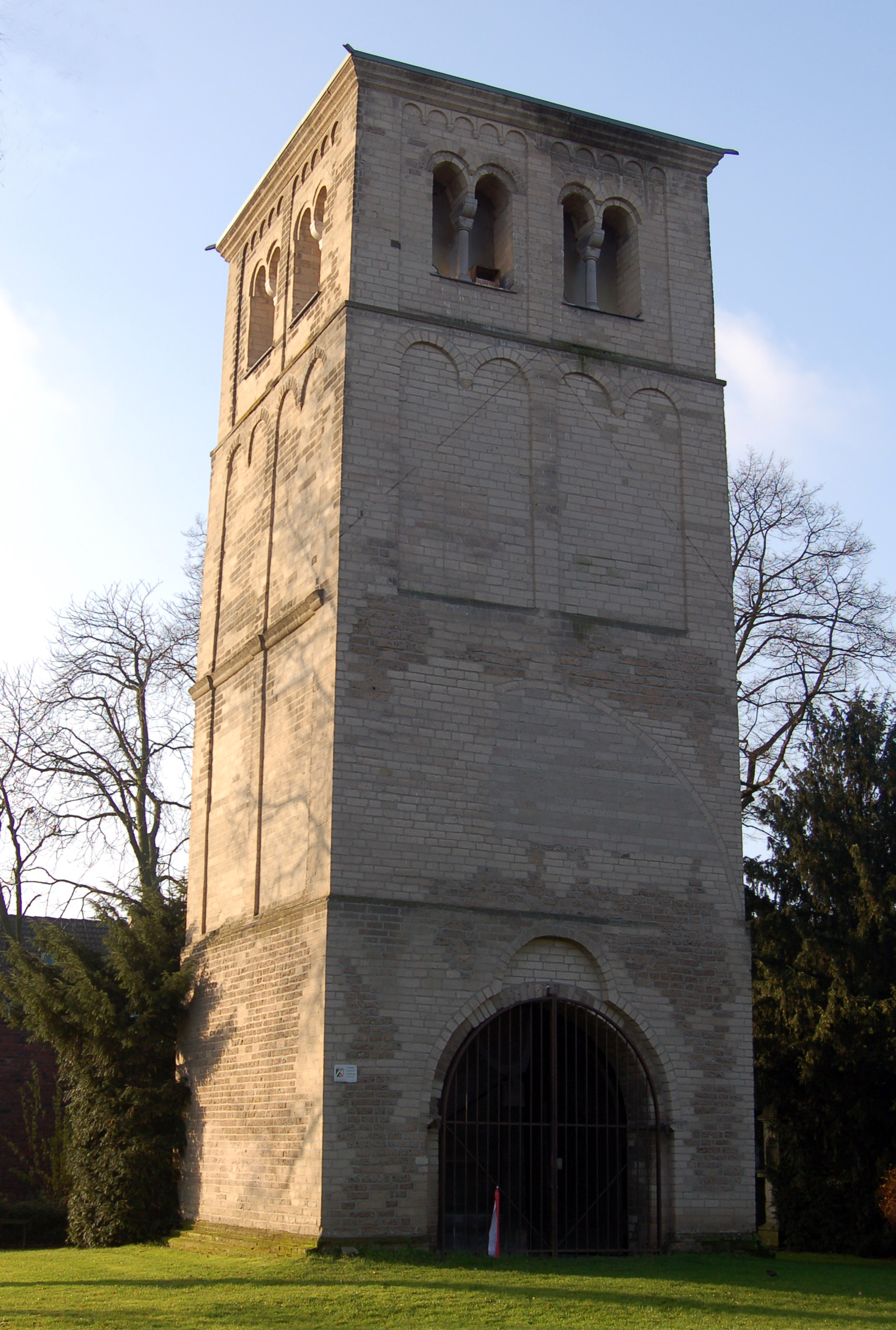
- Old Bell Tower in Büderich.

- Flag Coat of arms

- Location of Meerbusch within Rhein-Kreis Neuss district
- Interactive map of Meerbusch
- Location within Germany Location within North Rhine-Westphalia
- Coordinates: 51°16′N 6°40′E
- Country: Germany
- State: North Rhine-Westphalia
- Admin. region: Düsseldorf
- District: Rhein-Kreis Neuss

Government
  - Mayor (2020–25): Christian Bommers (CDU)

Area
  - Total: 64.39 km^{2} (24.86 sq mi)
- Elevation: 29–41 m (95–135 ft)

Population (2025-12-31)
  - Total: 56,947
  - Density: 884.4/km^{2} (2,291/sq mi)
- Time zone: UTC+01:00 (CET)
  - Summer (DST): UTC+02:00 (CEST)
- Postal codes: 40667, 40668, 40670
- Dialling codes: 02132, 02150, 02159
- Vehicle registration: NE
- Website: www.meerbusch.de

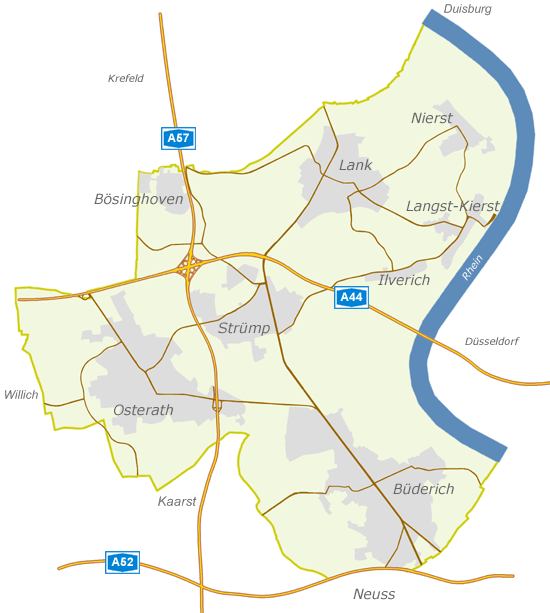
Street map of Meerbusch – main roads only

Meerbusch (German: [ˈmeːɐ̯bʊʃ]) is a town in Rhein-Kreis Neuss, North Rhine-Westphalia, Germany. It has been an incorporated town since 1970. Meerbusch is the municipality with the most income millionaires in North Rhine-Westphalia.

== Geography ==
Meerbusch is a town in the Lower Rhine region of northwestern Germany. It is located between Krefeld and Düsseldorf near Düsseldorf Airport and Messe Düsseldorf. Other neighbouring towns and cities are Duisburg, Kaarst, Willich and Neuss. The total area is divided into eight villages of varying sizes which used to be independent communes before the municipality was founded.

Administrative division
Division	Area (km^{2})	Area (%)	Population
Büderich	17.06	26	21,528
Osterath	12.02	18	12,756
Lank-Latum	6.85	11	9,861
Strümp	6.20	10	5,836
Ossum-Bösinghoven	5.03	8	2,272
Nierst	7.22	11	1,387
Langst-Kierst	3.55	6	1,004
Ilverich	6.44	10	649

== Population ==
Historical population

Year	Pop.	±% p.a.
1965	40,140	—
1970	46,870	+3.15%
1975	50,794	+1.62%
1980	49,870	−0.37%
1985	49,037	−0.34%
1990	52,104	+1.22%
1995	54,206	+0.79%

Year	Pop.	±% p.a.
2000	55,175	+0.35%
2005	54,367	−0.29%
2010	54,318	−0.02%
2015	54,892	+0.21%
2020	56,479	+0.57%
2025	56,947	+0.17%

Source: Landesdatabank Nordrhein-Westfalen

== Economy ==
Many companies have set up offices in the town's several light industrial estates. Most significantly, IMAV-Hydraulik GmbH has its headquarters in "Breite Straße" and Epson, Ernst-Rademacher GmbH, Nedap, ATHLON, BOBST GROUP and Kyocera Mita have settled in the business park at Mollsfeld, part of a large development called "Mollsfeld North". Thanks to its excellent motorway connections (A57 and A44) the town boasts several business parks and light industrial estates, also featuring logistics operations. The "Fritz-Wendt-Straße" industrial estate in Strümp was developed because of the grinding technology company Wendt GmbH. The "In der Loh" business park in Lank is home to businesses in the SME sector such as Abit AG and KUPP GmbH, and features modern architecture in "Robert-Bosch-Straße".

== Culture ==
The town sees frequent theatre plays and music events staged the Aula of SMG (Städt. Meerbusch Gymnasium, one of Meerbusch's two regional Grammar Schools) in Strümp, and at Forum Wasserturm, based in Lank Latum, predominantly featuring the comedy and satire genres. Each winter a popular folkloristic stage play is being performed in front of a 6,000+ strong audience.

== Notable people ==
- Florian Schneider (1947–2020), musician, leader of Kraftwerk
- Michael Sommer (1952–2025), trade unionist
- Hansi Kürsch (born 1966), musician
- Michael Funke (born 1969), racing driver
- Ekaterina Moré (born 1976), Russian painter and author; lives here
- Grim104 (born 1988), rapper

== Twin towns – sister cities ==
Meerbusch is twinned with:

- Fouesnant, France
- Shijōnawate, Japan
