= Meerbusch Challenger =

- 2023 Meerbusch Challenger

Defunct tennis tournament
- Event name: Meerbusch
- Location: Meerbusch, Germany
- Venue: Teremeer Sport & Tennis Resort
- Category: ATP Challenger Tour
- Surface: Clay (red)
- Draw: 32S/32Q/16D
- Prize money: €73,000 (2023), €35,000+H
- Website: website

The Rhein Asset Open (previously Tennis Open Stadtwerke Meerbusch) was a professional tennis tournament played on outdoor red clay courts. It was part of the Association of Tennis Professionals (ATP) Challenger Tour. It was held annually at Sportpark Büderich – am Eisenbrand and at the Teremeer Sport & Tennis Resort in Meerbusch, Germany from 2013 until 2023.

== Past finals ==
=== Singles ===
Year	Champion	Runner-up	Score
2023	(United Kingdom) Jan Choinski	(Argentina) Camilo Ugo Carabelli	6–4, 6–0
2022	(Spain) Bernabé Zapata Miralles	(Austria) Dennis Novak	6–1, 6–2
2021	(Chile) Tomás Barrios Vera	(Argentina) Juan Manuel Cerúndolo	7–6^{(9–7)}, 6–3
2020	Not held		
2019	(Portugal) Pedro Sousa	(Serbia) Peđa Krstin	7–6^{(7–4)}, 4–6, 6–3
2018	(Slovakia) Filip Horanský	(Germany) Jan Choinski	6–7^{(7–9)}, 6–3, 6–3
2017	(Spain) Ricardo Ojeda Lara	(Austria) Andreas Haider-Maurer	6–4, 6–3
2016	(Germany) Florian Mayer	(Germany) Maximilian Marterer	7–6^{(7–4)}, 6–2
2015	(Austria) Andreas Haider-Maurer	(Argentina) Carlos Berlocq	6–2, 6–4
2014	(Slovakia) Jozef Kovalík	(Russia) Andrey Kuznetsov	6–1, 6–4
2013	(Czech Republic) Jan Hájek	(Netherlands) Jesse Huta Galung	6–3, 6–4

=== Doubles ===
Year	Champions	Runners-up	Score
2023	(France) Manuel Guinard (France) Grégoire Jacq	(Brazil) Fernando Romboli (Brazil) Marcelo Zormann	7–5, 7–6^{(7–3)}
2022	(Netherlands) David Pel (Poland) Szymon Walków	(Austria) Neil Oberleitner (Austria) Philipp Oswald	7–5, 6–1
2021	(Poland) Szymon Walków (Poland) Jan Zieliński	(Germany) Dustin Brown (Netherlands) Robin Haase	6–3, 6–1
2020	Not held		
2019	(Germany) Andre Begemann (Romania) Florin Mergea	(India) Sriram Balaji (India) Vishnu Vardhan	7–6^{(7–1)}, 6–7^{(4–7)}, [10–3]
2018	(Spain) David Pérez Sanz (Netherlands) Mark Vervoort	(Poland) Grzegorz Panfil (Ukraine) Volodymyr Uzhylovskyi	3–6, 6–4, [10–7]
2017	(Germany) Kevin Krawietz (Germany) Andreas Mies	(Germany) Dustin Brown (Croatia) Antonio Šančić	6–1, 7–6^{(7–5)}
2016	(Russia) Mikhail Elgin (Belarus) Andrei Vasilevski	(Belgium) Sander Gillé (Belgium) Joran Vliegen	7–6^{(8–6)}, 6–4
2015	(Germany) Dustin Brown (Australia) Rameez Junaid	(Netherlands) Wesley Koolhof (Netherlands) Matwé Middelkoop	6–4, 7–5
2014	(Germany) Matthias Bachinger (Germany) Dominik Meffert	(China) Gong Maoxin (Chinese Taipei) Peng Hsien-yin	6–3, 3–6, [10–6]
2013	(Australia) Rameez Junaid (Germany) Frank Moser	(Germany) Dustin Brown (Germany) Philipp Marx	6–3, 7–6^{(7–4)}
