= 2016 Hoff Open =

- Date: 6–12 June
- Edition: 2nd
- Draw: 32S / 16D
- Prize money: $75,000 +H
- Surface: Clay
- Location: Moscow, Russia

Champions

Singles
- (Kazakhstan) Mikhail Kukushkin

Doubles
- (Argentina) Facundo Argüello / (Venezuela) Roberto Maytín
← 2015 ·	Hoff Open	· 2017 →

The 2016 Hoff Open was a professional tennis tournament played on clay courts. It was the second edition of the tournament which was part of the 2016 ATP Challenger Tour. It took place in Moscow, Russia between 6 and 12 June 2016.

== Singles main-draw entrants ==
=== Seeds ===
Country	Player	Rank^{1}	Seed
KAZ	Mikhail Kukushkin	83	1
RUS	Karen Khachanov	108	2
MDA	Radu Albot	137	3
RUS	Alexander Kudryavtsev	156	4
ARG	Facundo Argüello	162	5
BRA	André Ghem	165	6
KAZ	Aleksandr Nedovyesov	174	7
RUS	Andrey Rublev	192	8

- ^{1} Rankings are as of May 30, 2016.

=== Other entrants ===
The following players received wildcards into the singles main draw:

- (Russia) Alexander Bublik
- (Russia) Aslan Karatsev
- (Canada) Denis Shapovalov
- (France) Alexandre Sidorenko

The following players received entry into the singles main draw with a protected ranking:

- (Slovenia) Blaž Kavčič

The following players received entry from the qualifying draw:

- (Ecuador) Emilio Gómez
- (Serbia) Miki Janković
- (Russia) Ronald Slobodchikov
- (Russia) Alexander Zhurbin

== Champions ==
=== Singles ===
- (Kazakhstan) Mikhail Kukushkin def. (Canada) Steven Diez, 6–3, 6–3

=== Doubles ===
- (Argentina) Facundo Argüello / (Venezuela) Roberto Maytín def. (Georgia (country)) Aleksandre Metreveli / (Kazakhstan) Dmitry Popko, 6–2, 7–5
