= 2015 Hoff Open – Doubles =

Doubles
- 2015 Hoff Open

Final
- Champion: (Argentina) Renzo Olivo (Argentina) Horacio Zeballos
- Runner-up: (Chile) Julio Peralta (United States) Matt Seeberger
- Score: 7–5, 6–3

Events
Singles	Doubles
Hoff Open	· 2016 →

It was the first edition of the tournament.
Renzo Olivo and Horacio Zeballos won the title, defeating Julio Peralta and Matt Seeberger in the final, 7–5, 6–3.

== Seeds ==
1. (Belarus) Sergey Betov / (Russia) Michail Elgin (quarterfinals)
2. (Moldova) Radu Albot / (Russia) Alexander Kudryavtsev (first round)
3. (Belarus) Yaraslau Shyla / (Belarus) Andrei Vasilevski (first round)
4. (Lithuania) Laurynas Grigelis / (Italy) Matteo Viola (quarterfinals)

== Draw ==
=== Key ===
- Q = Qualifier
- WC = Wild card
- LL = Lucky loser
- Alt = Alternate
- ITF = ITF entry
- PR = Protected ranking
- SR = Special ranking
- SE = Special exempt
- JE = Junior exempt
- JR = Junior Accelerator Programme entrant
- CO = College Accelerator Programme entrant
- NG = Next Gen Accelerator Program entrant
- w/o = Walkover
- r = Retired
- d = Defaulted

First round
1	(Belarus) S Betov (Russia) M Elgin	6	6
WC	(Russia) I Gakhov (Russia) E Tyurnev	4	4
WC	(Russia) P Davydenko (Russia) A Vatutin	1	2
(Bosnia and Herzegovina) T Brkić (Bosnia and Herzegovina) D Džumhur	6	6
4	(Lithuania) L Grigelis (Italy) M Viola	6	6
(Argentina) Patricio Heras (Portugal) R Machado	2	2
(Argentina) R Olivo (Argentina) H Zeballos	6	6
(Spain) D Muñoz de la Nava (Spain) R Ramírez Hidalgo	3	4
(Russia) E Donskoy (Russia) T Gabashvili	4	6	[7]
(Republic of Ireland) J Cluskey (Republic of Ireland) D O'Hare	6	2	[10]
(Chile) J Peralta (United States) M Seeberger	2	6	[10]
3	(Belarus) Y Shyla (Belarus) A Vasilevski	6	4	[8]
(Argentina) P Cachin (Brazil) F de Paula	5	0^{r}
WC	(Russia) D Medvedev (Russia) A Zaitcev	7	0
(Russia) K Khachanov (Russia) A Rublev	6	6^{5}	[10]
2	(Moldova) R Albot (Russia) A Kudryavtsev	4	7^{7}	[7]

Quarterfinals
1	(Belarus) S Betov (Russia) M Elgin	4	6	[1]
(Bosnia and Herzegovina) T Brkić (Bosnia and Herzegovina) D Džumhur	6	4	[10]
4	(Lithuania) L Grigelis (Italy) M Viola	3	4
(Argentina) R Olivo (Argentina) H Zeballos	6	6
(Republic of Ireland) J Cluskey (Republic of Ireland) D O'Hare	1	2
(Chile) J Peralta (United States) M Seeberger	6	6
WC	(Russia) D Medvedev (Russia) A Zaitcev	7	0	[6]
(Russia) K Khachanov (Russia) A Rublev	5	6	[10]

Semifinals
(Bosnia and Herzegovina) T Brkić (Bosnia and Herzegovina) D Džumhur	2	2
(Argentina) R Olivo (Argentina) H Zeballos	6	6
(Chile) J Peralta (United States) M Seeberger	2	6	[10]
(Russia) K Khachanov (Russia) A Rublev	6	4	[5]

Final
(Argentina) R Olivo (Argentina) H Zeballos	7	6
(Chile) J Peralta (United States) M Seeberger	5	3
