= 2015 ATP Challenger 2001 Team Padova – Doubles =

Doubles
- 2015 ATP Challenger 2001 Team Padova

Final
- Champion: (Russia) Michail Elgin (Russia) Andrey Rublev
- Runner-up: (Italy) Federico Gaio (Italy) Alessandro Giannessi
- Score: 6–4, 7–6^{(7–4)}

Events
| Singles | Doubles |
| ← 2014 · | ATP Challenger 2001 Team Padova |

Roberto Maytín and Andrés Molteni was the defending champion, but they did not participate this year.

Michail Elgin and Andrey Rublev won the title, defeating Federico Gaio and Alessandro Giannessi in the final, 6–4, 7–6^{(7–4)}.

== Seeds ==
1. (Italy) Flavio Cipolla / (Argentina) Máximo González (semifinals)
2. (United States) James Cerretani / (Romania) Costin Pavăl (first round)
3. (Peru) Sergio Galdós / (Croatia) Dino Marcan (first round)
4. (Monaco) Benjamin Balleret / (Italy) Alessandro Motti (first round)

== Draw ==
=== Key ===
- Q = Qualifier
- WC = Wild card
- LL = Lucky loser
- Alt = Alternate
- SE = Special exempt
- PR = Protected ranking
- ITF = ITF entry
- JE = Junior exempt
- w/o = Walkover
- r = Retired
- d = Defaulted
- SR = Special ranking

First round
1 | (Italy) F Cipolla (Argentina) M González | 6 | 6
WC | (Italy) Marco Bergagnin (Italy) Michele Longo | 3 | 1
(Colombia) N Barrientos (Sweden) C Lindell | 6 | 6
(Egypt) M Safwat (Croatia) A Šančić | 4 | 4
3 | (Peru) S Galdós (Croatia) D Marcan | 6 | 3 | [6]
WC | (Italy) F Gaio (Italy) A Giannessi | 3 | 6 | [10]
(Argentina) P Cachin (Spain) R Carballés Baena | 3 | 2
(Bolivia) H Dellien (Mexico) C Ramírez | 6 | 6
(Argentina) F Argüello (Argentina) N Kicker | 2 | 4
(Slovakia) A Martin (Chile) H Podlipnik Castillo | 6 | 6
WC | (Italy) Omar Giacalone (Italy) S Napolitano | 6 | 6
4 | (Monaco) B Balleret (Italy) A Motti | 1 | 3
Alt | (Italy) M Bortolotti (Greece) A Jakupovic | 2 | 3
(Russia) M Elgin (Russia) A Rublev | 6 | 6
(Romania) P Grigoriu (United Kingdom) D Rice | 6 | 5 | [10]
2 | (United States) J Cerretani (Romania) C Pavăl | 3 | 7 | [8]

Quarterfinals
1 | (Italy) F Cipolla (Argentina) M González | 3 | 6 | [10]
(Colombia) N Barrientos (Sweden) C Lindell | 6 | 2 | [8]
WC | (Italy) F Gaio (Italy) A Giannessi | 3 | 7 | [10]
(Bolivia) H Dellien (Mexico) C Ramírez | 6 | 5 | [5]
(Slovakia) A Martin (Chile) H Podlipnik Castillo | 6 | 6
WC | (Italy) O Giacalone (Italy) S Napolitano | 4 | 4
(Russia) M Elgin (Russia) A Rublev | 6 | 6^{3} | [10]
(Romania) P Grigoriu (United Kingdom) D Rice | 3 | 7^{7} | [7]

Semifinals
1 | (Italy) F Cipolla (Argentina) M González | 2 | 6 | [3]
WC | (Italy) F Gaio (Italy) A Giannessi | 6 | 4 | [10]
(Slovakia) A Martin (Chile) H Podlipnik Castillo | 6^{4} | 6 | [8]
(Russia) M Elgin (Russia) A Rublev | 7^{7} | 4 | [10]

Final
WC | (Italy) F Gaio (Italy) A Giannessi | 4 | 6^{4}
(Russia) M Elgin (Russia) A Rublev | 6 | 7^{7}
