= 2016 Hoff Open – Singles =

Singles
- 2016 Hoff Open

Final
- Champion: (Kazakhstan) Mikhail Kukushkin
- Runner-up: (Canada) Steven Diez
- Score: 6–3, 6–3

Events
Singles	Doubles
← 2015 ·	Hoff Open	· 2017 →

Daniel Muñoz de la Nava was the defending champion, but chose not to defend his title.

Mikhail Kukushkin won the title after defeating Steven Diez 6–3, 6–3 in the final.

== Seeds ==
1. (Kazakhstan) Mikhail Kukushkin (champion)
2. (Russia) Karen Khachanov (semifinals)
3. (Moldova) Radu Albot (second round)
4. (Russia) Alexander Kudryavtsev (first round)
5. (Argentina) Facundo Argüello (second round)
6. (Brazil) André Ghem (second round)
7. (Kazakhstan) Aleksandr Nedovyesov (quarterfinals, retired)
8. (Russia) Andrey Rublev (second round)

== Draw ==
=== Key ===
- Q = Qualifier
- WC = Wild card
- LL = Lucky loser
- Alt = Alternate
- SE = Special exempt
- PR = Protected ranking
- ITF = ITF entry
- JE = Junior exempt
- w/o = Walkover
- r = Retired
- d = Defaulted
- SR = Special ranking

=== Finals ===
Semifinals
1	(Kazakhstan) Mikhail Kukushkin	6	3
Q	(Ecuador) Emilio Gómez	2	0^{r}
(Canada) Steven Diez	6	6
2	(Russia) Karen Khachanov	1	4

Final
1	(Kazakhstan) Mikhail Kukushkin	6	6
(Canada) Steven Diez	3	3

=== Top half ===
First round
1	(Kazakhstan) M Kukushkin	6	6
(Argentina) T Lipovšek Puches	3	4
(Serbia) N Milojević	4	6	6
(Ukraine) D Molchanov	6	2	3
WC	(Russia) A Karatsev	1	3
(Spain) P Riba	6	6
(Spain) R Ramírez Hidalgo	3	3
7	(Kazakhstan) A Nedovyesov	6	6
3	(Moldova) R Albot	6	6
(Sweden) C Lindell	1	2
(Uzbekistan) F Dustov	0	0^{r}
WC	(Russia) A Bublik	6	0
(Georgia (country)) A Metreveli	3	2
Q	(Ecuador) E Gómez	6	6
Q	(Russia) A Zhurbin	4	5
5	(Argentina) F Argüello	6	7

Second round
1	(Kazakhstan) M Kukushkin	4	6	6
(Serbia) N Milojević	6	3	4
(Spain) P Riba	6^{4}	4
7	(Kazakhstan) A Nedovyesov	7^{7}	6
3	(Moldova) R Albot	6	4	4
WC	(Russia) A Bublik	3	6	6
Q	(Ecuador) E Gómez	6	6
5	(Argentina) F Argüello	3	4

Quarterfinals
1	(Kazakhstan) M Kukushkin	6	2
7	(Kazakhstan) A Nedovyesov	1	1^{r}
WC	(Russia) A Bublik	6^{5}	6^{5}
Q	(Ecuador) E Gómez	7^{7}	7^{7}

Semifinals
1	(Kazakhstan) M Kukushkin	6	3
Q	(Ecuador) E Gómez	2	0^{r}

=== Bottom half ===
First round
8	(Russia) A Rublev	6	6
PR	(Slovenia) B Kavčič	2	2
(Canada) S Diez	6	6
(Turkey) M İlhan	3	3
WC	(Canada) D Shapovalov	3	6	7
WC	(France) A Sidorenko	6	4	5
(Kazakhstan) D Popko	6	6
4	(Russia) A Kudryavtsev	0	4
6	(Brazil) A Ghem	6	6
(Austria) B Trinker	0	2
Q	(Serbia) M Janković	6	7^{7}
Q	(Russia) Ronald Slobodchikov	0	6^{2}
(Spain) D Pérez Sanz	6	6
(Belarus) I Ivashka	4	4
(India) R Ramanathan	4	4
2	(Russia) K Khachanov	6	6

Second round
8	(Russia) A Rublev	6^{6}	3
(Canada) S Diez	7^{8}	6
WC	(Canada) D Shapovalov	3	1
(Kazakhstan) D Popko	6	6
6	(Brazil) A Ghem	6^{12}	4
Q	(Serbia) M Janković	7^{14}	6
(Spain) D Pérez Sanz	1	0
2	(Russia) K Khachanov	6	6

Quarterfinals
(Canada) S Diez	7^{10}	6
(Kazakhstan) D Popko	6^{8}	3
Q	(Serbia) M Janković	3	3
2	(Russia) K Khachanov	6	6

Semifinals
(Canada) S Diez	6	6
2	(Russia) K Khachanov	1	4
