= 2015 Sparta Prague Open =

- Date: 8 – 13 June
- Edition: 2nd
- Category: ATP Challenger Tour
- Draw: 32S / 16D
- Prize money: €42,500+H
- Surface: Clay
- Location: Prague, Czech Republic
- Venue: TK Sparta Prague

Champions

Singles
- (Slovakia) Norbert Gombos

Doubles
- (Poland) Mateusz Kowalczyk / (Slovakia) Igor Zelenay
- Sparta Prague Open Challenger

The 2015 Sparta Prague Open was a professional tennis tournament played on clay courts. It was the second edition of the tournament which was part of the 2015 ATP Challenger Tour. It took place in Prague, Czech Republic between 8 and 13 June 2015.

== Singles main-draw entrants ==
=== Seeds ===
Country	Player	Rank^{1}	Seed
BRA	João Souza	78	1
SVK	Norbert Gombos	103	2
BEL	Kimmer Coppejans	107	3
KAZ	Aleksandr Nedovyesov	115	4
BRA	André Ghem	140	5
ESP	Albert Montañés	155	6
AUT	Gerald Melzer	163	7
ESP	Íñigo Cervantes	164	8

- ^{1} Rankings as of 25 May 2015.

=== Other entrants ===
The following players received wildcards into the singles main draw:

- (Serbia) Djordje Djokovic
- (Czech Republic) Dominik Kellovský
- (Czech Republic) Zdeněk Kolář
- (Czech Republic) Patrik Rikl

The following players received entry from the qualifying draw:

- (Brazil) Rogério Dutra Silva
- (Poland) Kamil Majchrzak
- (Czech Republic) Marek Michalička
- (Czech Republic) Jan Šátral

== Doubles main-draw entrants ==
=== Seeds ===
Country	Player	Country	Player	Rank^{1}	Seed
POL	Mateusz Kowalczyk	SVK	Igor Zelenay	197	1
VEN	Roberto Maytín	MEX	Miguel Ángel Reyes-Varela	227	2
BLR	Aliaksandr Bury	ITA	Riccardo Ghedin	245	3
CRO	Dino Marcan	CRO	Antonio Šančić	354	4

- ^{1} Rankings as of May 25, 2015.

=== Other entrants ===
The following pairs received wildcards into the doubles main draw:

- (Czech Republic) Dominik Kellovský / (Switzerland) Henri Laaksonen
- (Czech Republic) Tomáš Papík / (Czech Republic) Matěj Vocel
- (Czech Republic) Patrik Rikl / (Czech Republic) Pavel Štaubert

== Champions ==
=== Singles ===
- (Slovakia) Norbert Gombos def. (Spain) Albert Montañés, 7–6^{(7–5)}, 5–7, 7–6^{(7–2)}.

=== Doubles ===
- (Poland) Mateusz Kowalczyk / (Slovakia) Igor Zelenay def. (Venezuela) Roberto Maytín / (Mexico) Miguel Ángel Reyes-Varela, 6–2, 7–6^{(7–5)}.
