= Moscow Open =

Moscow Open may refer to:

- Aeroflot Open, chess tournament held in Moscow
- Hoff Open, men's tennis tournament held in Moscow
- Moscow Ladies Open, former women's tennis tournament
- Moscow Open (athletics), track and field meeting formerly part of the European Athletic Association tour
- Moscow Open (chess), annual chess tournament held in Moscow, won by Alexander Lastin in 2006
- Moscow River Cup, women's tennis tournament
- Russian Open, former golf tournament held in Moscow
