= 2014 Challenger Team Città di Padova =

- Date: 23–29 June
- Edition: 1st
- Draw: 32S / 16D
- Prize money: €42,500
- Surface: Clay
- Location: Padova, Italy

Champions

Singles
- (Argentina) Máximo González

Doubles
- (Venezuela) Roberto Maytín / (Argentina) Andrés Molteni
- Challenger Team Città di Padova

The 2014 Challenger Team Città di Padova was a professional tennis tournament played on clay courts. It was the first edition of the tournament which was part of the 2014 ATP Challenger Tour. It took place in Padova, Italy between 23 and 29 June 2013.

== Singles main-draw entrants ==
=== Seeds ===
Country	Player	Rank^{1}	Seed
ESP	Albert Ramos	111	1
ARG	Máximo González	120	2
ROU	Adrian Ungur	161	3
ITA	Potito Starace	168	4
ITA	Thomas Fabbiano	171	5
ITA	Matteo Viola	178	6
ITA	Flavio Cipolla	199	7
CRO	Kristijan Mesaroš	202	8

- ^{1} Rankings are as of June 16, 2014.

=== Other entrants ===
The following players received wildcards into the singles main draw:

- (Italy) Alessandro Giannessi
- (Italy) Salvatore Caruso
- (Italy) Federico Gaio
- (Italy) Marco Bortolotti

The following players received entry from the qualifying draw:

- (Uruguay) Martín Cuevas
- (Bolivia) Hugo Dellien
- (France) Laurent Lokoli
- (Serbia) Nikola Čačić

== Doubles main-draw entrants ==
=== Seeds ===
Country	Player	Country	Player	Rank^{1}	Seed
ARG	Guillermo Durán	ARG	Máximo González	172	1
ITA	Riccardo Ghedin	ITA	Claudio Grassi	256	2
PHI	Ruben Gonzales	ITA	Alessandro Motti	323	3
VEN	Roberto Maytín	ARG	Andrés Molteni	329	4

- ^{1} Rankings as of June 16, 2014.

=== Other entrants ===
The following pairs received wildcards into the doubles main draw:

- (Italy) Tommaso Lago / (Italy) Francesco Picco
- (Italy) Marco Bergagnin / (Italy) Lorenzo Schmid
- (Italy) Andrea Fava / (Italy) Riccardo Marcon

== Champions ==
=== Singles ===
- (Argentina) Máximo González def. (Spain) Albert Ramos, 6–3, 6–4

=== Doubles ===
- (Venezuela) Roberto Maytín / (Argentina) Andrés Molteni def. (Argentina) Guillermo Durán / (Argentina) Máximo González, 6–2, 3–6, [10–8]
