= 2015 Hoff Open – Singles =

Singles
- 2015 Hoff Open

Final
- Champions: (Spain) Daniel Muñoz de la Nava
- Runners-up: (Moldova) Radu Albot
- Score: 6–0, 6–1

Events
Singles	Doubles
Hoff Open	· 2016 →

It was the first edition of the tournament.
Daniel Muñoz de la Nava won the title, defeating Radu Albot in the final, 6–0, 6–1.

== Seeds ==
1. (Spain) Marcel Granollers (quarterfinals)
2. (Russia) Teymuraz Gabashvili (quarterfinals)
3. (Bosnia and Herzegovina) Damir Džumhur (quarterfinals)
4. (Slovenia) Blaž Rola (first round)
5. (Moldova) Radu Albot (final)
6. (Russia) Alexander Kudryavtsev (first round)
7. (Spain) Daniel Muñoz de la Nava (champion)
8. (Argentina) Horacio Zeballos (semifinals)

== Draw ==
=== Key ===
- Q = Qualifier
- WC = Wild card
- LL = Lucky loser
- Alt = Alternate
- SE = Special exempt
- PR = Protected ranking
- ITF = ITF entry
- JE = Junior exempt
- w/o = Walkover
- r = Retired
- d = Defaulted
- SR = Special ranking

=== Finals ===
Semifinals
7	(Spain) Daniel Muñoz de la Nava	6^{9}	6	6
8	(Argentina) Horacio Zeballos	7^{11}	4	1
(Russia) Andrey Rublev	4	7^{8}	3
5	(Moldova) Radu Albot	6	6^{6}	6

Final
7	(Spain) Daniel Muñoz de la Nava	6	6
5	(Moldova) Radu Albot	0	1

=== Top half ===
First round
1	(Spain) M Granollers	6	4	6
(France) Jules Marie	2	6	4
(Italy) M Viola	5	6	5
(Brazil) F de Paula	7	3	7
WC	(Russia) D Medvedev	6	4	6
WC	(Russia) E Tyurnev	4	6	3
Q	(Brazil) T Monteiro	3	6	6^{4}
7	(Spain) D Muñoz de la Nava	6	4	7^{7}
3	(Bosnia and Herzegovina) D Džumhur	3	6	6
WC	(Russia) P Davydenko	6	2	2
LL	(Belarus) M Dubarenco	7^{8}	6
(Serbia) M Zekić	6^{6}	2
Q	(Russia) M Elgin	6	6
Q	(Russia) A Zaitcev	2	3
(Portugal) R Machado	3	1
8	(Argentina) H Zeballos	6	6

Second round
1	(Spain) M Granollers	6	6
(Brazil) F de Paula	3	1
WC	(Russia) D Medvedev	0	6^{8}
7	(Spain) D Muñoz de la Nava	6	7^{10}
3	(Bosnia and Herzegovina) D Džumhur	6	6
LL	(Belarus) M Dubarenco	4	3
Q	(Russia) M Elgin	3	4
8	(Argentina) H Zeballos	6	6

Quarterfinals
1	(Spain) M Granollers	3	7	4
7	(Spain) D Muñoz de la Nava	6	5	6
3	(Bosnia and Herzegovina) D Džumhur	6^{4}	3
8	(Argentina) H Zeballos	7^{7}	6

Semifinals
7	(Spain) D Muñoz de la Nava	6^{9}	6	6
8	(Argentina) H Zeballos	7^{11}	4	1

=== Bottom half ===
First round
6	(Russia) A Kudryavtsev	6	5	2
(Argentina) R Olivo	3	7	6
(Serbia) L Djere	1	6^{2}
(Russia) A Rublev	6	7^{7}
(Belarus) Y Shyla	4	6	3
(Russia) K Khachanov	6	4	6
(Russia) E Donskoy	3	6	6
4	(Slovenia) B Rola	6	3	4
5	(Moldova) R Albot	7^{7}	6^{5}	6
Q	(Argentina) Patricio Heras	6^{5}	7^{7}	2
WC	(Russia) I Gakhov	2	4
(Bosnia and Herzegovina) T Brkić	6	6
(France) J Eysseric	2	2
(Croatia) A Veić	6	6
(Spain) R Ramírez Hidalgo	5	4
2	(Russia) T Gabashvili	7	6

Second round
(Argentina) R Olivo	3	6	4
(Russia) A Rublev	6	3	6
(Russia) K Khachanov	3	6^{1}
(Russia) E Donskoy	6	7^{7}
5	(Moldova) R Albot	4	6	6
(Bosnia and Herzegovina) T Brkić	6	3	2
(Croatia) A Veić	4	3
2	(Russia) T Gabashvili	6	6

Quarterfinals
(Russia) A Rublev	6	6^{5}	6
(Russia) E Donskoy	4	7^{7}	4
5	(Moldova) R Albot	6	6
2	(Russia) T Gabashvili	3	4

Semifinals
(Russia) A Rublev	4	7^{8}	3
5	(Moldova) R Albot	6	6^{6}	6
