= 2014 Challenger Team Città di Padova – Doubles =

Doubles
- 2014 Challenger Team Città di Padova

Final
- Champions: (Venezuela) Roberto Maytín (Argentina) Andrés Molteni
- Runners-up: (Argentina) Guillermo Durán (Argentina) Máximo González
- Score: 6–2, 3–6, [10–8]

Events
Singles	Doubles
Challenger Team Città di Padova	· 2015 →

This was the first edition of the tournament.

Roberto Maytín and Andrés Molteni won the title, defeating Guillermo Durán and Máximo González in the final, 6–2, 3–6, [10–8].

== Seeds ==
1. (Argentina) Guillermo Durán / (Argentina) Máximo González (final)
2. (Italy) Riccardo Ghedin / (Italy) Claudio Grassi (semifinals)
3. (Philippines) Ruben Gonzales / (Italy) Alessandro Motti (quarterfinals)
4. (Venezuela) Roberto Maytín / (Argentina) Andrés Molteni (champions)

== Draw ==
=== Key ===
- Q = Qualifier
- WC = Wild card
- LL = Lucky loser
- Alt = Alternate
- SE = Special exempt
- PR = Protected ranking
- ITF = ITF entry
- JE = Junior exempt
- w/o = Walkover
- r = Retired
- d = Defaulted
- SR = Special ranking

=== Draw ===
First round
1	(Argentina) G Durán (Argentina) M González	2	7	[10]
(Austria) S Bader (United Kingdom) D Walsh	6	5	[8]
WC	(Italy) Tommaso Lago (Italy) Francesco Picco	6^{6}	3
(Uruguay) M Cuevas (Romania) A Ungur	7^{8}	6
3	(Philippines) R Gonzales (Italy) A Motti	7	4	[10]
(Serbia) N Čačić (Serbia) G Tošić	5	6	[7]
(Uruguay) A Behar (United States) V Mirzadeh	6	6
(Italy) F Cipolla (Italy) P Starace	3	4
(Canada) S Diez (Spain) E López-Pérez	3	6	[7]
(Brazil) G Clezar (Bolivia) H Dellien	6	4	[10]
(Peru) D Beretta (Peru) S Galdós	2	6^{2}
4	(Venezuela) R Maytín (Argentina) A Molteni	6	7^{7}
WC	(Italy) Marco Bergagnin (Italy) Lorenzo Schmid	4	4
(Italy) Francesco Borgo (Italy) M Viola	6	6
WC	(Italy) Andrea Fava (Italy) Riccardo Marcon	1	2
2	(Italy) R Ghedin (Italy) C Grassi	6	6

Quarterfinals
1	(Argentina) G Durán (Argentina) M González	6	6
(Uruguay) M Cuevas (Romania) A Ungur	3	2
3	(Philippines) R Gonzales (Italy) A Motti	6^{5}	6^{3}
(Uruguay) A Behar (United States) V Mirzadeh	7^{7}	7^{7}
(Brazil) G Clezar (Bolivia) H Dellien	4	1
4	(Venezuela) R Maytín (Argentina) A Molteni	6	6
(Italy) F Borgo (Italy) M Viola	4	7^{7}	[3]
2	(Italy) R Ghedin (Italy) C Grassi	6	6^{2}	[10]

Semifinals
1	(Argentina) G Durán (Argentina) M González	6	6
(Uruguay) A Behar (United States) V Mirzadeh	4	3
4	(Venezuela) R Maytín (Argentina) A Molteni	6	7^{7}
2	(Italy) R Ghedin (Italy) C Grassi	3	6^{5}

Final
1	(Argentina) G Durán (Argentina) M González	2	6	[8]
4	(Venezuela) R Maytín (Argentina) A Molteni	6	3	[10]
