= 2014 Challenger Team Città di Padova – Singles =

Singles
- 2014 Challenger Team Città di Padova

Final
- Champion: (Argentina) Máximo González
- Runner-up: (Spain) Albert Ramos
- Score: 6–3, 6–4

Events
| Singles | Doubles |
| Challenger Team Città di Padova | · 2015 → |

This was the first edition of the tournament.

Máximo González won the title, defeating Albert Ramos in the final, 6–3, 6–4.

== Seeds ==
1. (Spain) Albert Ramos (final)
2. (Argentina) Máximo González (champion)
3. (Romania) Adrian Ungur (second round)
4. (Italy) Potito Starace (first round)
5. (Italy) Thomas Fabbiano (second round)
6. (Italy) Matteo Viola (quarterfinals)
7. (Italy) Flavio Cipolla (second round)
8. (Croatia) Kristijan Mesaroš (first round)

== Draw ==
=== Key ===
- Q = Qualifier
- WC = Wild card
- LL = Lucky loser
- Alt = Alternate
- SE = Special exempt
- PR = Protected ranking
- ITF = ITF entry
- JE = Junior exempt
- w/o = Walkover
- r = Retired
- d = Defaulted
- SR = Special ranking

=== Finals ===
Semifinals
1 | (Spain) Albert Ramos | 6 | 7
(Spain) Jordi Samper Montaña | 0 | 5
Q | (Serbia) Nikola Čačić | 2 | 2
2 | (Argentina) Máximo González | 6 | 6

Final
1 | (Spain) Albert Ramos | 3 | 4
2 | (Argentina) Máximo González | 6 | 6

=== Top half ===
First round
1 | (Spain) A Ramos | 6 | 7^{7}
Q | (Uruguay) M Cuevas | 3 | 6^{3}
Q | (Bolivia) H Dellien | 7^{7} | 6
(Brazil) G Clezar | 6^{5} | 1
(Russia) A Karatsev | 5 | 3
(Croatia) A Veić | 7 | 6
(Spain) G Granollers | 7^{7} | 6
8 | (Croatia) K Mesaroš | 6^{3} | 4
3 | (Romania) A Ungur | 6 | 6
(Canada) S Diez | 2 | 2
(Republic of Ireland) L Sorensen | 0^{r}
WC | (Italy) A Giannessi | 2
(Spain) JS Montaña | 6 | 6
Q | (France) L Lokoli | 0 | 4
(Argentina) A Molteni | 6 | 5 | 4
5 | (Italy) T Fabbiano | 4 | 7 | 6

Second round
1 | (Spain) A Ramos | 6 | 6
Q | (Bolivia) H Dellien | 2 | 1
(Croatia) A Veić | 6 | 1
(Spain) G Granollers | 3 | 0^{r}
3 | (Romania) A Ungur | 5 | 0
WC | (Italy) A Giannessi | 7 | 6
(Spain) JS Montaña | 6 | 6
5 | (Italy) T Fabbiano | 2 | 2

Quarterfinals
1 | (Spain) A Ramos | 7^{7} | 6
(Croatia) A Veić | 6^{1} | 1
WC | (Italy) A Giannessi | 4 | 5
(Spain) JS Montaña | 6 | 7

Semifinals
1 | (Spain) A Ramos | 6 | 7
(Spain) JS Montaña | 0 | 5

=== Bottom half ===
First round
7 | (Italy) F Cipolla | 6 | 6
(Egypt) M Safwat | 4 | 0
(Bosnia and Herzegovina) M Bašić | 7 | 2 | 5
(Argentina) R Olivo | 5 | 6 | 7
(Italy) G Naso | 2 | 1
(France) M Teixeira | 6 | 6
Q | (Serbia) N Čačić | 7^{7} | 3 | 6
4 | (Italy) P Starace | 6^{4} | 6 | 3
6 | (Italy) M Viola | 6 | 6
WC | (Italy) S Caruso | 3 | 2
(Croatia) T Androić | 1 | 3
WC | (Italy) F Gaio | 6 | 6
(Spain) E López-Pérez | 3 | 6 | 3
(Belgium) G Gigounon | 6 | 1 | 6
WC | (Italy) M Bortolotti | 3 | 2
2 | (Argentina) M González | 6 | 6

Second round
7 | (Italy) F Cipolla | 2 | 6 | 4
(Argentina) R Olivo | 6 | 0 | 6
(France) M Teixeira | 5 | 3
Q | (Serbia) N Čačić | 7 | 6
6 | (Italy) M Viola | 7^{7} | 6
WC | (Italy) F Gaio | 6^{3} | 2
(Belgium) G Gigounon | 1 | 7^{7} | 4
2 | (Argentina) M González | 6 | 6^{4} | 6

Quarterfinals
(Argentina) R Olivo | 3 | 2
Q | (Serbia) N Čačić | 6 | 6
6 | (Italy) M Viola | 6 | 4 | 3
2 | (Argentina) M González | 3 | 6 | 6

Semifinals
Q | (Serbia) N Čačić | 2 | 2
2 | (Argentina) M González | 6 | 6
