= 2015 ATP Challenger 2001 Team Padova – Singles =

Singles
- 2015 ATP Challenger 2001 Team Padova

Final
- Champion: (Slovakia) Andrej Martin
- Runner-up: (Spain) Albert Montañés
- Score: 0–6, 6–4, 7–6^{(8–6)}

Events
Singles	Doubles
← 2014 ·	ATP Challenger 2001 Team Padova

Máximo González was the defending champion, but lost to Rubén Ramírez Hidalgo in the first round.

Andrej Martin won the title defeating Albert Montañés in the final, 0–6, 6–4, 7–6^{(8–6)}, after saving one match point in the tie-break.

== Seeds ==
1. (Colombia) Alejandro González (second round)
2. (Argentina) Máximo González (first round)
3. (Italy) Marco Cecchinato (quarterfinals)
4. (Spain) Albert Montañés (final)
5. (Argentina) Facundo Argüello (first round)
6. (Spain) Roberto Carballés Baena (first round)
7. (Chile) Hans Podlipnik Castillo (quarterfinals)
8. (France) Mathias Bourgue (first round)

== Draw ==
=== Key ===
- Q = Qualifier
- WC = Wild card
- LL = Lucky loser
- Alt = Alternate
- SE = Special exempt
- PR = Protected ranking
- ITF = ITF entry
- JE = Junior exempt
- w/o = Walkover
- r = Retired
- d = Defaulted
- SR = Special ranking

=== Finals ===
Semifinals
(Slovakia) Andrej Martin	6^{5}	6	6
SE	(France) Calvin Hemery	7^{7}	4	2
4	(Spain) Albert Montañés	3	6	7
Q	(Italy) Federico Gaio	6	3	5

Final
(Slovakia) Andrej Martin	0	6	7^{8}
4	(Spain) Albert Montañés	6	4	6^{6}

=== Top half ===
First round
1	(Colombia) A González	7	6
PR	(Portugal) P Sousa	5	1
(Egypt) M Safwat	2	3
(Slovakia) A Martin	6	6
Q	(Italy) A Giannessi	3	6	6
(Russia) A Rublev	6	2	4
Alt	(Italy) R Bellotti	6	4
6	(Spain) R Carballés Baena	4	2^{r}
3	(Italy) M Cecchinato	6	6
WC	(Italy) S Napolitano	4	2
(Argentina) N Kicker	1	2
WC	(South Korea) D-h Lee	6	6
(Italy) A Arnaboldi	1	6^{5}
(Argentina) P Cachin	6	7^{7}
SE	(France) C Hemery	6	5	7^{7}
8	(France) M Bourque	2	7	6^{5}

Second round
1	(Colombia) A González	3	1
(Slovakia) A Martin	6	6
Q	(Italy) A Giannessi	3	6	6
Alt	(Italy) R Bellotti	6	1	4
3	(Italy) M Cecchinato	6	6
WC	(South Korea) D-h Lee	2	2
(Argentina) P Cachin	1	4
SE	(France) C Hemery	6	6

Quarterfinals
(Slovakia) A Martin	6	7^{8}
Q	(Italy) A Giannessi	2	6^{6}
3	(Italy) M Cecchinato	4	3
SE	(France) C Hemery	6	6

Semifinals
(Slovakia) A Martin	6^{5}	6	6
SE	(France) C Hemery	7^{7}	4	2

=== Bottom half ===
First round
7	(Chile) H Podlipnik Castillo	2	6	7^{8}
WC	(Italy) S Travaglia	6	3	6^{6}
(Italy) M Viola	6	5	1^{r}
WC	(Italy) Omar Giacalone	4	7	3
(Belgium) G Gigounon	7	2	2
Q	(Italy) Erik Crepaldi	5	6	6
(Sweden) C Lindell	5	3
4	(Spain) A Montañés	7	6
5	(Argentina) F Argüello	0	3
(Italy) F Volandri	6	6
(Spain) J Samper-Montaña	4	6^{4}
Q	(Italy) F Gaio	6	7^{7}
Q	(Bolivia) H Dellien	3	6	6
(Italy) T Fabbiano	6	1	3
(Spain) R Ramírez Hidalgo	4	7^{11}	6
2	(Argentina) M González	6	6^{9}	4

Second round
7	(Chile) H Podlipnik Castillo	6	6
WC	(Italy) O Giacalone	4	2
Q	(Italy) E Crepaldi	0	0
4	(Spain) A Montañés	6	6
(Italy) F Volandri	2	1
Q	(Italy) F Gaio	6	6
Q	(Bolivia) H Dellien	7	5	3
(Spain) R Ramírez Hidalgo	5	7	6

Quarterfinals
7	(Chile) H Podlipnik Castillo	5	4
4	(Spain) A Montañés	7	6
Q	(Italy) F Gaio	6	6
(Spain) R Ramírez Hidalgo	0	3

Semifinals
4	(Spain) A Montañés	3	6	7
Q	(Italy) F Gaio	6	3	5
