= 2015 Sparta Prague Open – Doubles =

Doubles
- 2015 Sparta Prague Open

Final
- Champion: (Poland) Mateusz Kowalczyk (Slovakia) Igor Zelenay
- Runner-up: (Venezuela) Roberto Maytín (Mexico) Miguel Ángel Reyes-Varela
- Score: 6–2, 7–6^{(7–5)}

Events
Singles	Doubles
- Sparta Prague Open Challenger

Roman Jebavý and Jiří Veselý were the defending champions, but Veselý decided not to participate this year. Jebavý played alongside Adam Pavlásek, but they lost to Dino Marcan and Antonio Šančić in the quarterfinals.

Mateusz Kowalczyk and Igor Zelenay won the tournament, defeating Roberto Maytín and Miguel Ángel Reyes-Varela in the final, 6–2, 7–6^{(7–5)}.

== Seeds ==
1. (Poland) Mateusz Kowalczyk / (Slovakia) Igor Zelenay (champions)
2. (Venezuela) Roberto Maytín / (Mexico) Miguel Ángel Reyes-Varela (final)
3. (Belarus) Alexander Bury / (Italy) Riccardo Ghedin (semifinals)
4. (Croatia) Dino Marcan / (Croatia) Antonio Šančić (semifinals)

== Draw ==
Key

- Q = Qualifier
- WC = Wild card
- LL = Lucky loser
- Alt = Alternate
- ITF = ITF entry
- PR = Protected ranking
- SR = Special ranking
- SE = Special exempt
- JE = Junior exempt
- JR = Junior Accelerator Programme entrant
- CO = College Accelerator Programme entrant
- NG = Next Gen Accelerator Program entrant
- w/o = Walkover
- r = Retired
- d = Defaulted

First round
1	(Poland) M Kowalczyk (Slovakia) I Zelenay	6	6
(Hungary) M Fucsovics (Kazakhstan) A Nedovyesov	3	2
(Slovakia) A Martin (Chile) H Podlipnik-Castillo	6	7
(Spain) Í Cervantes (Spain) P Riba	4	5
3	(Belarus) A Bury (Italy) R Ghedin	6	7
(Romania) P Grigoriu (Brazil) F Neis	4	5
WC	(Czech Republic) D Kellovský (Switzerland) H Laaksonen	6^{2}	6	[5]
(France) T Lamasine (Japan) Y Uchiyama	7^{7}	1	[10]
(Czech Republic) R Jebavý (Czech Republic) A Pavlásek	6	6
WC	(Czech Republic) Tomáš Papík (Czech Republic) M Vocel	3	3
WC	(Czech Republic) P Rikl (Czech Republic) Pavel Štaubert	1	2
4	(Croatia) D Marcan (Croatia) A Šančić	6	6
(Brazil) A Ghem (Brazil) J Souza	6	6
(Ecuador) G Lapentti (Sweden) C Lindell	4	3
(Slovakia) N Gombos (Czech Republic) J Šátral	5	3
2	(Venezuela) R Maytín (Mexico) MÁ Reyes-Varela	7	6

Quarterfinals
1	(Poland) M Kowalczyk (Slovakia) I Zelenay	6	6
(Slovakia) A Martin (Chile) H Podlipnik-Castillo	4	4
3	(Belarus) A Bury (Italy) R Ghedin	6	3	[10]
(France) T Lamasine (Japan) Y Uchiyama	3	6	[6]
(Czech Republic) R Jebavý (Czech Republic) A Pavlásek	2	3
4	(Croatia) D Marcan (Croatia) A Šančić	6	6
(Brazil) A Ghem (Brazil) J Souza	1	0
2	(Venezuela) R Maytín (Mexico) MÁ Reyes-Varela	6	6

Semifinals
1	(Poland) M Kowalczyk (Slovakia) I Zelenay	7	6
3	(Belarus) A Bury (Italy) R Ghedin	5	4
4	(Croatia) D Marcan (Croatia) A Šančić	6^{3}	4
2	(Venezuela) R Maytín (Mexico) MÁ Reyes-Varela	7^{7}	6

Final
1	(Poland) M Kowalczyk (Slovakia) I Zelenay	6	7^{7}
2	(Venezuela) R Maytín (Mexico) MÁ Reyes-Varela	2	6^{5}
