= 2016 Hoff Open – Doubles =

Doubles
- 2016 Hoff Open

Final
- Champions: (Argentina) Facundo Argüello; (Venezuela) Roberto Maytín
- Runners-up: (Georgia (country)) Aleksandre Metreveli; (Kazakhstan) Dmitry Popko
- Score: 6–2, 7–5

Events
Singles	Doubles
- Hoff Open

Renzo Olivo and Horacio Zeballos were the defending champions, but chose not to defend their title.

Facundo Argüello and Roberto Maytín won the title after defeating Aleksandre Metreveli and Dmitry Popko 6–2, 7–5 in the final.

== Seeds ==
1. (Moldova) Radu Albot / (Belarus) Sergey Betov (quarterfinals)
2. (Russia) Mikhail Elgin / (Russia) Alexander Kudryavtsev (quarterfinals)
3. (Ukraine) Denys Molchanov / (Kazakhstan) Aleksandr Nedovyesov (first round)
4. (Russia) Denis Matsukevich / (Belarus) Andrei Vasilevski (first round)

== Draw ==
Key

- Q = Qualifier
- WC = Wild card
- LL = Lucky loser
- Alt = Alternate
- ITF = ITF entry
- PR = Protected ranking
- SR = Special ranking
- SE = Special exempt
- JE = Junior exempt
- JR = Junior Accelerator Programme entrant
- CO = College Accelerator Programme entrant
- NG = Next Gen Accelerator Program entrant
- w/o = Walkover
- r = Retired
- d = Defaulted

First round

Quarterfinals

Semifinals

Final

1
- (Moldova) R Albot
- (Belarus) S Betov
5
7
[10]

- (Turkey) M İlhan
- (Russia) I Nedelko
7
5
[7]

1
- (Moldova) R Albot
- (Belarus) S Betov
6^{5}
3

- (Spain) D Pérez Sanz
- (India) R Ramanathan
4
6
[10]

- (Spain) D Pérez Sanz
- (India) R Ramanathan
7^{7}
6

- (Canada) S Diez
- (Serbia) N Milojević
6
4
[2]

- (Spain) D Pérez Sanz
- (India) R Ramanathan
6
3
[7]

4
- (Russia) D Matsukevich
- (Belarus) A Vasilevski
4
6^{6}

- (Georgia (country)) A Metreveli
- (Kazakhstan) D Popko
3
6
[10]

- (Georgia (country)) A Metreveli
- (Kazakhstan) D Popko
6
7^{8}

- (Georgia (country)) A Metreveli
- (Kazakhstan) D Popko
7
6

- (Uzbekistan) F Dustov
- (France) A Sidorenko
1^{r}

Alt
- (Russia) A Igoshin
- (Argentina) T Lipovšek Puches
5
4

Alt
- (Russia) Alexandr Igoshin
- (Argentina) T Lipovšek Puches
3

- (Georgia (country)) A Metreveli
- (Kazakhstan) D Popko
2
5

WC
- (Russia) Alexey Gavrilov
- (Russia) D Golovanov
6^{1}
3

- (Argentina) F Argüello
- (Venezuela) R Maytín
6
7

PR
- (Serbia) M Janković
- (Slovenia) B Kavčič
7^{7}
6

PR
- (Serbia) M Janković
- (Slovenia) B Kavčič
2
4

- (Spain) R Ramírez Hidalgo
- (Spain) P Riba
2
6
[12]

- (Spain) R Ramírez Hidalgo
- (Spain) P Riba
6
6

3
- (Ukraine) D Molchanov
- (Kazakhstan) A Nedovyesov
6
1
[10]

- (Spain) R Ramírez Hidalgo
- (Spain) P Riba
4
0^{r}

- (Argentina) F Argüello
- (Venezuela) R Maytín
6
1
[13]

- (Argentina) F Argüello
- (Venezuela) R Maytín
6
0

WC
- (Russia) A Bublik
- (Russia) A Karatsev
2
6
[11]

- (Argentina) F Argüello
- (Venezuela) R Maytín
6
7^{7}

Alt
- (Ecuador) G Escobar
- (Sweden) C Lindell
3
4

2
- (Russia) M Elgin
- (Russia) A Kudryavtsev
3
6^{4}

2
- (Russia) M Elgin
- (Russia) A Kudryavtsev
6
6
