= 2015 Hoff Open =

- Date: 8–14 June
- Edition: 1st
- Draw: 32S / 16D
- Prize money: $50,000+H
- Surface: Clay
- Location: Moscow, Russia

Champions

Singles
- (Spain) Daniel Muñoz de la Nava

Doubles
- (Argentina) Renzo Olivo / (Argentina) Horacio Zeballos
Hoff Open	· 2016 →

The 2015 Hoff Open was a professional tennis tournament played on clay courts. It was the first edition of the tournament which was part of the 2015 ATP Challenger Tour. It took place in Moscow, Russia between 8 and 14 June 2015.

== Singles main-draw entrants ==
=== Seeds ===
Country	Player	Rank^{1}	Seed
ESP	Marcel Granollers	57	1
RUS	Teymuraz Gabashvili	74	2
BIH	Damir Džumhur	88	3
SLO	Blaž Rola	97	4
MDA	Radu Albot	130	5
RUS	Alexander Kudryavtsev	131	6
ESP	Daniel Muñoz de la Nava	134	7
ARG	Horacio Zeballos	142	8

- ^{1} Rankings are as of May 25, 2015.

=== Other entrants ===
The following players received wildcards into the singles main draw:

- (Russia) Philipp Davydenko
- (Russia) Ivan Gakhov
- (Russia) Daniil Medvedev
- (Russia) Evgenii Tiurnev

The following players received entry from the qualifying draw:

- (Argentina) Patricio Heras
- (Russia) Anton Zaitcev
- (Russia) Mikhail Elgin
- (Brazil) Thiago Monteiro

The following players received entry as a lucky loser into the main draw:

- (Moldova) Maxim Dubarenco

== Doubles main-draw entrants ==
=== Seeds ===
Country	Player	Country	Player	Rank^{1}	Seed
BLR	Sergey Betov	RUS	Michail Elgin	240	1
MDA	Radu Albot	RUS	Alexander Kudryavtsev	293	2
BLR	Yaraslav Shyla	BLR	Andrei Vasilevski	393	3
LTU	Laurynas Grigelis	ITA	Matteo Viola	422	4

- ^{1} Rankings as of May 25, 2015.

=== Other entrants ===
The following pairs received wildcards into the doubles main draw:

- (Russia) Ivan Gakhov / (Russia) Evgenii Tiurnev
- (Russia) Philipp Davydenko / (Russia) Alexey Vatutin
- (Russia) Daniil Medvedev / (Russia) Anton Zaitcev

== Champions ==
=== Singles ===
- (Spain) Daniel Muñoz de la Nava def. (Moldova) Radu Albot, 6–0, 6–1.

=== Doubles ===
- (Argentina) Renzo Olivo / (Argentina) Horacio Zeballos def. (Chile) Julio Peralta / (United States) Matt Seeberger, 7–5, 6–3.
