= 2015 ATP Challenger 2001 Team Padova =

Professional tennis tournament

- Date: 29 June – 5 July
- Edition: 2nd
- Draw: 32S / 16D
- Prize money: €42,500+H
- Surface: Clay
- Location: Padova, Italy

Champions

Singles
- (Slovakia) Andrej Martin

Doubles
- (Russia) Michail Elgin / (Russia) Andrey Rublev
- ATP Challenger 2001 Team Padova

The 2015 ATP Challenger 2001 Team Padova was a professional tennis tournament played on clay courts. It was the second edition of the tournament which was part of the 2015 ATP Challenger Tour. It took place in Padova, Italy between 29 June and 5 July 2013.

== Singles main-draw entrants ==
=== Seeds ===
Country	Player	Rank^{1}	Seed
COL	Alejandro González	105	1
ARG	Máximo González	115	2
ITA	Marco Cecchinato	123	3
ESP	Albert Montañés	126	4
ARG	Facundo Argüello	142	5
ESP	Roberto Carballés Baena	169	6
CHI	Hans Podlipnik Castillo	175	7
FRA	Mathias Bourgue	178	8

- ^{1} Rankings are as of June 22, 2015.

=== Other entrants ===
The following players received wildcards into the singles main draw:

- (Italy) Omar Giacalone
- (South Korea) Lee Duck-hee
- (Italy) Stefano Napolitano
- (Italy) Stefano Travaglia

The following players received entry from the qualifying draw:

- (Italy) Erik Crepaldi
- (Bolivia) Hugo Dellien
- (Italy) Federico Gaio
- (Italy) Alessandro Giannessi

The following players used the protected ranking to gain entry into the main draw:

- (Portugal) Pedro Sousa

The following players was given Special Exempt to gain entry into the main draw:

- (France) Calvin Hemery

The following players was given alternate to gain entry into the main draw:

- (Italy) Riccardo Bellotti

== Doubles main-draw entrants ==
=== Seeds ===
Country	Player	Country	Player	Rank^{1}	Seed
ITA	Flavio Cipolla	ARG	Máximo González	255	1
USA	James Cerretani	ROU	Costin Pavăl	308	2
PER	Sergio Galdós	CRO	Dino Marcan	310	3
MON	Benjamin Balleret	ITA	Alessandro Motti	317	4

- ^{1} Rankings as of June 22, 2015.

=== Other entrants ===
The following pairs received wildcards into the doubles main draw:

- (Italy) Marco Bergagnin / (Italy) Michele Longo
- (Italy) Federico Gaio / (Italy) Alessandro Giannessi
- (Italy) Omar Giacalone / (Italy) Stefano Napolitano

The following pairs gained entry into the doubles main draw as an alternate:

- (Italy) Marco Bortolotti / (Greece) Alexandros Jakupovic

== Champions ==
=== Singles ===
- (Slovakia) Andrej Martin def. (Spain) Albert Montañés, 0–6, 6–4, 7–6^{(8–6)}

=== Doubles ===
- (Russia) Michail Elgin / (Russia) Andrey Rublev def. (Italy) Federico Gaio / (Italy) Alessandro Giannessi, 6–4, 7–6^{(7–4)}
