= 2015 Sparta Prague Open – Singles =

Singles
- 2015 Sparta Prague Open

Final
- Champion: (Slovakia) Norbert Gombos
- Runner-up: (Spain) Albert Montañés
- Score: 7–6^{(7–5)}, 5–7, 7–6^{(7–2)}

Events
Singles	Doubles
- Sparta Prague Open Challenger

Lukáš Rosol was the defending champion but chose not to compete.

Norbert Gombos won the tournament defeating Albert Montañés in the final, 7–6^{(7–5)}, 5–7, 7–6^{(7–2)}.

== Seeds ==
1. (Brazil) João Souza (first round)
2. (Slovakia) Norbert Gombos (champion)
3. (Belgium) Kimmer Coppejans (semifinals)
4. (Kazakhstan) Aleksandr Nedovyesov (semifinals)
5. (Brazil) André Ghem (second round)
6. (Spain) Albert Montañés (final)
7. (Austria) Gerald Melzer (first round)
8. (Spain) Íñigo Cervantes (quarterfinals)

== Draw ==
Key

- Q = Qualifier
- WC = Wild card
- LL = Lucky loser
- Alt = Alternate
- ITF = ITF entry
- PR = Protected ranking
- SR = Special ranking
- SE = Special exempt
- JE = Junior exempt
- JR = Junior Accelerator Programme entrant
- CO = College Accelerator Programme entrant
- NG = Next Gen Accelerator Program entrant
- w/o = Walkover
- r = Retired
- d = Defaulted

=== Finals ===
Semifinals
6	(Spain) Albert Montañés	1	6	6
4	(Kazakhstan) Aleksandr Nedovyesov	6	3	2
3	(Belgium) Kimmer Coppejans	6^{4}	2
2	(Slovakia) Norbert Gombos	7^{7}	6

Final
6	(Spain) Albert Montañés	6^{5}	7	6^{2}
2	(Slovakia) Norbert Gombos	7^{7}	5	7^{7}

=== Top half ===
First round
1	(Brazil) J Souza	6^{8}	5
(Chile) H Podlipnik Castillo	7^{10}	7
(Slovakia) J Kovalík	6	6
(Sweden) C Lindell	4	3
Q	(Czech Republic) J Šátral	6	6
WC	(Serbia) D Djokovic	3	2
(Slovakia) A Martin	2	1
6	(Spain) A Montañés	6	6
4	(Kazakhstan) A Nedovyesov	7^{8}	4	6
(Austria) D Novak	6^{6}	6	4
Q	(Poland) K Majchrzak	6	0	3
(France) T Lamasine	3	6	6
(Japan) T Daniel	6	4	6
(Bosnia and Herzegovina) A Šetkić	4	6	2
Q	(Czech Republic) M Michalička	6	4	4
5	(Brazil) A Ghem	1	6	6

Second round
(Chile) H Podlipnik Castillo	4	3
(Slovakia) J Kovalík	6	6
Q	(Czech Republic) J Šátral	3	5
6	(Spain) A Montañés	6	7
4	(Kazakhstan) A Nedovyesov	6	6
(France) T Lamasine	3	2
(Japan) T Daniel	6^{0}	6	6
5	(Brazil) A Ghem	7^{7}	4	2

Quarterfinals
(Slovakia) J Kovalík	2	6	2
6	(Spain) A Montañés	6	3	6
4	(Kazakhstan) A Nedovyesov	6	6
(Japan) T Daniel	4	3

Semifinals
6	(Spain) A Montañés	1	6	6
4	(Kazakhstan) A Nedovyesov	6	3	2

=== Bottom half ===
First round
7	(Austria) G Melzer	6	2	3
(Hungary) M Fucsovics	1	6	6
Q	(Brazil) R Dutra Silva	6	6
WC	(Czech Republic) Z Kolář	3	4
(Spain) P Riba	4	6	6
(Bolivia) H Dellien	6	3	4
WC	(Czech Republic) D Kellovský	0	2
3	(Belgium) K Coppejans	6	6
8	(Spain) Í Cervantes	6	6
(Ecuador) G Lapentti	0	2
(Czech Republic) A Pavlásek	6	6
(France) V Millot	3	2
WC	(Czech Republic) P Rikl	1	3
(Czech Republic) J Mertl	6	6
(Chile) JC Sáez	2	6^{3}
2	(Slovakia) N Gombos	6	7^{7}

Second round
(Hungary) M Fucsovics	6^{9}	6	7
Q	(Brazil) R Dutra Silva	7^{11}	4	5
(Spain) P Riba	2	0
3	(Belgium) K Coppejans	6	6
8	(Spain) Í Cervantes	4	7^{7}	6
(Czech Republic) A Pavlásek	6	6^{2}	4
(Czech Republic) J Mertl	7^{7}	3	5
2	(Slovakia) N Gombos	6^{5}	6	7

Quarterfinals
(Hungary) M Fucsovics	4	7	2
3	(Belgium) K Coppejans	6	5	6
8	(Spain) Í Cervantes	5	6	6^{3}
2	(Slovakia) N Gombos	7	4	7^{7}

Semifinals
3	(Belgium) K Coppejans	6^{4}	2
2	(Slovakia) N Gombos	7^{7}	6
