= Aleksandre Metreveli =

Georgian tennis player

- Country (sports): Georgia
- Born: 10 August 1993 (age 32) Tbilisi, Georgia
- Height: 1.83 m (6 ft 0 in)
- Plays: Right-handed (two handed-backhand)
- Prize money: $182,222

Singles
- Career record: 2–7 (at ATP Tour level, Grand Slam level, and in Davis Cup)
- Career titles: 0
- Highest ranking: No. 264 (6 June 2016)

Doubles
- Career record: 1–4 (at ATP Tour level, Grand Slam level, and in Davis Cup)
- Career titles: 0
- Highest ranking: No. 184 (25 July 2015)
- Current ranking: No. 1,688 (27 October 2025)

Team competitions
- Davis Cup: 18–10
- Last updated on: 27 October 2025.

Aleksandre Metreveli (Georgian: ალექსანდრე მეტრეველი, romanized: aleksandre met'reveli, pronounced [ɑlɛkʰsɑndɾɛ mɛtʼɾɛvɛli]; born 10 August 1993), nicknamed Sandro, is a Georgian tennis player. Metreveli has a career high ATP singles ranking of World No. 264 achieved on 6 June 2016. His career high ATP doubles ranking of World No. 184 was achieved on 25 July 2015. He has won 7 ITF singles titles and 4 ITF doubles titles.

== Personal life ==
He is the grandson of the famous tennis player Alexander Metreveli, former ATP No. 9 and 1973 Wimbledon finalist. In 2016, Metreveli broke both of his legs in a car accident, eventually recovering after five surgeries.

== Career ==
Playing for Georgia in Davis Cup, Metreveli has a W/L record of 18–10.

== ATP Challengers and ITF Futures finals ==
=== Singles: 10 (7–3) ===
Legend
Challengers (0–0)
Futures (7–3)

Result	W–L	Date	Category	Tournament	Surface	Opponent	Score
Win	1–0	13 April 2014	Futures	Shymkent, Kazakhstan F5	Clay	(Slovakia) Filip Horansky	6–4, 6–3
Win	2–0	7 June 2015	Futures	Pantiani, Georgia F4	Clay	(Italy) Marco Bortolotti	6–3, 6–2
Win	3–0	5 July 2015	Futures	Istanbul, Turkey F26	Hard	(France) Maxime Janvier	6–3, 2–6, 6–2
Win	4–0	11 July 2015	Futures	Istanbul, Turkey F27	Hard	(Belarus) Egor Gerasimov	6–3, 6–3
Win	5–0	9 August 2015	Futures	Istanbul, Turkey F31	Hard	(Spain) Jordi Vives	6–2, 5–2 RET
Win	6–0	10 October 2015	Futures	Shymkent, Kazakhstan F5	Clay	(Russia) Ivan Gakhov	6–1, 6–2
Loss	6–1	17 October 2015	Futures	Shymkent, Kazakhstan F6	Clay	(Kazakhstan) Dmitry Popko	4–6, 0–2 RET
Loss	6–2	26 March 2016	Futures	Ramat Hasharon, Israel F6	Hard	(United States) Peter Kobelt	3–6, 4–6
Win	7–2	10 July 2016	Futures	Amstelveen, Netherlands F4	Clay	(Netherlands) Jelle Sels	6–2, 6–0
Loss	7–3	15 July 2018	Futures	Telavi, Georgia F1	Clay	(Argentina) Nicolás Alberto Arreche	5–7, 5–7

=== Doubles: 13 (4–9) ===
Legend
Challengers (1–3)
Futures (3–6)

Result	W–L	Date	Category	Tournament	Surface	Partner	Opponents	Score
Loss	0–1	28 February 2014	Futures	Aktobe, Kazakhstan F1	Hard (i)	(Kazakhstan) Denis Yevseyev	(Belarus) Yaraslau Shyla (Belarus) Andrei Vasilevski	3–6, 6–3, [10–12]
Loss	0–2	10 October 2014	Futures	Shymkent, Kazakhstan F13	Clay	(Bulgaria) Aleksandar Lazov	(Spain) Enrique Lopez-Perez (India) Jeevan Nedunchezhiyan	3–6, 3–6
Loss	0–3	6 June 2015	Futures	Pantiani, Georgia F4	Clay	(Georgia (country)) Giorgi Javakhishvili	(Russia) Victor Baluda (Russia) Ivan Kalinin	5–7, 1–6
Loss	0–4	20 June 2015	Futures	Istanbul, Turkey F24	Hard	(Georgia (country)) Giorgi Javakhishvili	(Turkey) Tuna Altuna (Australia) Bradley Mousley	6–7^{(1–7)}, 6–7^{(2–7)}
Loss	0–5	19 September 2015	Challenger	Istanbul, Turkey	Hard	(Russia) Anton Zaitcev	(Russia) Andrey Kuznetsov (Kazakhstan) Aleksandr Nedovyesov	2–6, 7–5, [8–10]
Win	1–5	9 October 2015	Futures	Shymkent, Kazakhstan F5	Clay	(Russia) Ivan Gakhov	(Russia) Markos Kalovelonis (Bulgaria) Alexander Lazov	7–6^{(7–4)}, 6–3
Loss	1–6	25 March 2016	Futures	Ramat Hasharon, Israel F6	Hard	(Ukraine) Volodymyr Uzhylovskyi	(Austria) Lucas Miedler (Italy) Gianluigi Quinzi	1–6, 6–4, [5–10]
Loss	1–7	22 April 2016	Futures	Shymkent, Kazakhstan F3	Clay	(Russia) Markos Kalovelonis	(Uzbekistan) Sanjar Fayziev (Belarus) Andrei Vasilevski	2–6, 4–6
Win	2–7	29 April 2016	Futures	Shymkent, Kazakhstan F4	Clay	(Russia) Markos Kalovelonis	(Serbia) Miki Jankovic (Belarus) Andrei Vasilevski	6–4, 6–1
Loss	2–8	6 May 2016	Challenger	Karshi, Uzbekistan	Hard	(Kazakhstan) Dmitry Popko	(Spain) Enrique Lopez-Perez (India) Jeevan Nedunchezhiyan	1–6, 4–6
Loss	2–9	12 June 2016	Challenger	Moscow, Russia	Clay	(Kazakhstan) Dmitry Popko	(Argentina) Facundo Argüello (Venezuela) Roberto Maytín	2–6, 5–7
Win	3–9	17 July 2016	Challenger	Poznań, Poland	Clay	(Chinese Taipei) Peng Hsien-yin	(Poland) Mateusz Kowalczyk (Poland) Kamil Majchrzak	6–4, 3–6, [10–8]
Win	4–9	20 April 2018	Futures	Shymkent, Kazakhstan F4	Clay	(Kazakhstan) Denis Yevseyev	(Russia) Denis Klok (Russia) Vladimir Korolev	5–7, 7–6^{(7–4)}, [10–6]
