= ATP Challenger 2001 Team Padova =

- 2015 ATP Challenger 2001 Team Padova

Defunct tennis tournament
- Location: Padova, Italy
- Venue: Centro Sportivo 2000
- Category: ATP Challenger Tour
- Surface: Clay / Outdoors
- Draw: 32S/32Q/16D
- Prize money: €42,500+H

The ATP Challenger 2001 Team Padova formerly Challenger Team Città di Padova was a tennis tournament held in Padova, Italy between 2014 and 2015. In 2018, the event was reinstated replacing the International Tennis Tournament of Cortina. The event is part of the ATP Challenger Tour and is played on outdoor clay courts.

== Past finals ==
=== Singles ===
Year	Champion	Runner-up	Score
2015	(Slovakia) Andrej Martin	(Spain) Albert Montañés	0–6, 6–4, 7–6^{(8–6)}
2014	(Argentina) Máximo González	(Spain) Albert Ramos	6–3, 6–4

=== Doubles ===
Year	Champions	Runners-up	Score
2015	(Russia) Michail Elgin (Russia) Andrey Rublev	(Italy) Federico Gaio (Italy) Alessandro Giannessi	6–4, 7–6^{(7–4)}
2014	(Venezuela) Roberto Maytín (Argentina) Andrés Molteni	(Argentina) Guillermo Durán (Argentina) Máximo González	6–2, 3–6, [10–8]
