= Roberto Maytín =

Venezuelan tennis player (born 1989)

- Country (sports): Venezuela
- Residence: Miami, Florida, United States
- Born: 2 January 1989 (age 37) Valencia, Venezuela
- Height: 1.83 m (6 ft 0 in)
- Retired: 2020 (last match played)
- Plays: Right-handed (Double-handed backhand)
- College: Baylor University
- Coach: Jose De Armas, Cesar Wicha
- Prize money: $ 124,671

Singles
- Career record: 0-1 (ATP Tour level, Grand Slam level, and Davis Cup)
- Career titles: 0; 0 Challenger, 0 Futures
- Highest ranking: No. 643 (3 November 2008)

Doubles
- Career record: 15-14 (ATP Tour level, Grand Slam level, and Davis Cup)
- Career titles: 0; 14 Challenger, 18 Futures
- Highest ranking: No. 86 (15 June 2015)

Grand Slam doubles results
- Wimbledon: 1R (2015)
Medal record
Men's tennis
Representing Venezuela
South American Games
Gold medal – first place	2018 Cochabamba	Mixed Doubles
Central American and Caribbean Games
Bronze medal – third place	2014 Veracruz	Doubles
Bronze medal – third place	2014 Veracruz	Team Event
- Last updated on: 30 December 2022.

Roberto Maytín (Spanish pronunciation: [roˈβeɾto majˈtin]) is a Venezuelan former tennis player. In 2015 he broke into the top 100 of the doubles rankings reaching a high of world No. 86. In singles, he reached a career high of No. 643. He was known mostly for doubles, and has 14 ATP Challenger titles.

== Career ==
He played for the Venezuelan Davis Cup squad in 2012. He made his ATP debut in 2015 playing doubles with Colombian Juan Carlos Spir at the Ecuador Open in Quito.

In March 2021, Maytín has been banned from the sport for 14 years after admitting multiple breaches of the Tennis Anti-Corruption Program (TACP) rules from International Tennis Integrity Agency. In addition to the ban, Maytín was fined $100,000, of which $75,000 is suspended.

== ATP career finals ==
=== Doubles: 1 (1 runner-up) ===
Winner – Legend Grand Slam tournaments (0–0) ATP World Tour Finals (0–0) ATP World Tour Masters 1000 (0–0) ATP World Tour 500 Series (0–0) ATP World Tour 250 Series (0–1)	Finals by surface Hard (0–0) Clay (0–1) Grass (0–0)

Outcome	W–L	Date	Tournament	Surface	Partner	Opponents	Score
Runner-up	0–1	Aug 2017	Los Cabos Open, Cabo San Lucas, Mexico	Hard	(Peru) Sergio Galdós	(Colombia) Juan Sebastián Cabal (Philippines) Treat Huey	2–6, 3–6

== Challenger and Futures finals ==
=== Singles: 3 (0–3) ===
Legend (singles) ATP Challenger Tour (0–0) ITF Futures Tour (0–3)	Titles by surface Hard (0–3) Clay (0–0) Grass (0–0) Carpet (0–0)

Result	W–L	Date	Tournament	Tier	Surface	Opponent	Score
Loss	0–1	Nov 2007	Venezuela F8, Maracay	Futures	Hard	(Venezuela) José de Armas	2–6, 5–7
Loss	0–2	Aug 2008	Venezuela F6, Valencia	Futures	Hard	(France) Fabrice Martin	5–7, 4–6
Loss	0–3	Jul 2011	Venezuela F6, Caracas	Futures	Hard	(Australia) John Peers	6–7^{(4–7)}, 6–4, 6–7^{(2–7)}

=== Doubles: 54 (32–22) ===
Legend (doubles) ATP Challenger Tour (14–8) ITF Futures Tour (18–14)	Titles by surface Hard (19–15) Clay (13–7) Grass (0–0) Carpet (0–0)

Result	W–L	Date	Tournament	Tier	Surface	Partner	Opponents	Score
Win	1–0	Aug 2006	Venezuela F1, Caracas	Futures	Clay	(Venezuela) Óscar Posada	(Argentina) Alejandro Kon (Argentina) Damián Listingart	6–3, 7–6^{(7–4)}
Win	2–0	Aug 2006	Venezuela F2, Caracas	Futures	Hard	(Venezuela) Piero Luisi	(France) Benoît Bottéro (Austria) Christoph Palmanshofer	7–5, 7–5
Loss	2–1	Oct 2006	Venezuela F7, Valencia	Futures	Hard	(Venezuela) Román Recarte	(Cuba) Ricardo Chile-Fonte (Cuba) Luis Javier Cuellar Contreras	6–2, 4–6, 2–6
Win	3–1	Aug 2007	Peru F1, Lima	Futures	Clay	(El Salvador) Rafael Arévalo	(Brazil) Lenoir Ramos (Brazil) Renato Silveira	7–6^{(7–4)}, 6–2
Loss	3–2	Oct 2007	Venezuela F5, Caracas	Futures	Hard	(Venezuela) Piero Luisi	(Venezuela) José de Armas (Venezuela) Jimy Szymanski	7–6^{(7–5)}, 6–7^{(6–8)}, [1–10]
Loss	3–3	Oct 2007	Venezuela F6, Caracas	Futures	Hard	(Venezuela) Piero Luisi	(Dominican Republic) Víctor Estrella Burgos (Venezuela) Román Recarte	7–5, 2–6, [6–10]
Win	4–3	Nov 2007	Venezuela F8, Maracay	Futures	Hard	(Venezuela) Piero Luisi	(France) Marc Auradou (France) Philippe de Bonnevie	7–6^{(7–5)}, 6–2
Loss	4–4	Feb 2008	Cuba F1, La Habana	Futures	Hard	(Cuba) Luis Javier Cuellar Contreras	(Russia) Sergei Demekhine (Belarus) Pavel Katliarov	7–6^{(7–2)}, 4–6, [5–10]
Win	5–4	Feb 2008	Cuba F1, La Habana	Futures	Hard	(Venezuela) Piero Luisi	(Russia) Sergei Demekhine (Belarus) Pavel Katliarov	6–1, 4–6, [10–8]
Loss	5–5	Jun 2008	Venezuela F1, Maracay	Futures	Hard	(Venezuela) Piero Luisi	(Venezuela) Miguel Cicenia (Venezuela) Luis David Martínez	3–6, 3–6
Win	6–5	Jul 2008	Venezuela F4, Maracaibo	Futures	Hard	(Venezuela) Piero Luisi	(Colombia) Alejandro González (Colombia) Eduardo Struvay	6–7^{(4–7)}, 7–6^{(7–5)}, [14–12]
Loss	6–6	Aug 2008	Venezuela F5, Valencia	Futures	Hard	(Venezuela) Piero Luisi	(Colombia) Alejandro González (Colombia) Eduardo Struvay	w/o
Win	7–6	Aug 2008	Venezuela F6, Valencia	Futures	Hard	(Venezuela) Piero Luisi	(Ecuador) Iván Endara (United States) Brett Ross	6–3, 6–4
Loss	7–7	Aug 2008	Ecuador F2, Guayaquil	Futures	Hard	(Venezuela) Luis David Martínez	(United States) Shane La Porte (France) Fabrice Martin	6–7^{(8–10)}, 6–3, [7–10]
Win	8–7	Oct 2008	Venezuela F7, Barquisimeto	Futures	Clay	(Venezuela) Piero Luisi	(Venezuela) William Campos (Ecuador) Julio César Campozano	6–4, 6–0
Loss	8–8	Oct 2008	Venezuela F8, Valencia	Futures	Hard	(Venezuela) Piero Luisi	(Colombia) Alejandro González (Colombia) Pablo González	3–6, 4–6
Win	9–8	Oct 2008	Venezuela F9, Caracas	Futures	Hard	(Venezuela) Piero Luisi	(Venezuela) Pedro Ast (Venezuela) Yohny Romero	7–6^{(7–4)}, 6–3
Win	10–8	Jun 2011	Venezuela F4, Maracaibo	Futures	Hard	(Australia) John Peers	(United States) Peter Aarts (United States) Chris Letcher	6–2, 6–1
Loss	10–9	Jun 2011	Venezuela F5, Coro	Futures	Hard	(Australia) John Peers	(Venezuela) Piero Luisi (Venezuela) Román Recarte	4–6, 3–6
Win	11–9	Jul 2011	Venezuela F6, Caracas	Futures	Hard	(Venezuela) Piero Luisi	(Australia) John Peers (Ecuador) Roberto Quiroz	6–4, 6–4
Win	12–9	Jun 2013	USA F14, Innisbrook	Futures	Clay	(El Salvador) Marcelo Arévalo	(United States) Sekou Bangoura (United States) Eric Quigley	3–6, 6–4, [10–7]
Loss	12–10	Jun 2013	USA F15, Indian Harbour Beach	Futures	Clay	(El Salvador) Marcelo Arévalo	(Moldova) Roman Borvanov (Canada) Milan Pokrajac	6–7^{(4–7)}, 3–6
Loss	12–11	Jun 2013	USA F16, Amelia Island	Futures	Clay	(El Salvador) Marcelo Arévalo	(United States) Jarmere Jenkins (United States) Mac Styslinger	4–6, 2–6
Win	13–11	Jul 2013	USA F19, Joplin	Futures	Hard	(Mexico) Daniel Garza	(Israel) Dekel Bar (Australia) Leon Frost	6–1, 6–2
Win	14–11	Aug 2013	Venezuela F3, Caracas	Futures	Hard	(Venezuela) Luis David Martínez	(Puerto Rico) Alex Llompart (Argentina) Mateo Nicolás Martínez	1–6, 6–2, [12–10]
Loss	14–12	Aug 2013	Venezuela F4, Caracas	Futures	Hard	(Dominican Republic) José Hernández-Fernández	(Puerto Rico) Alex Llompart (Argentina) Mateo Nicolás Martínez	5–7, 5–7
Win	15–12	Aug 2013	Venezuela F5, Caracas	Futures	Hard	(Venezuela) Luis David Martínez	(Venezuela) Jesús Bandrés (Venezuela) Luis Fernando Ramírez	2–6, 7–6^{(7–5)}, [10–3]
Win	16–12	Oct 2013	Mexico F16, Quintana Roo	Futures	Hard	(Venezuela) Luis David Martínez	(Puerto Rico) Alex Llompart (New Zealand) Finn Tearney	6–3, 6–4
Loss	16–13	Nov 2013	Mexico F18, Mérida	Futures	Hard	(Venezuela) Luis David Martínez	(United States) Oscar Fabian Matthews (United States) Kyle McMorrow	1–6, 5–7
Loss	16–14	Nov 2013	Venezuela F8, Valencia	Futures	Hard	(Venezuela) Piero Luisi	(Argentina) Maximiliano Estévez (Argentina) Juan Ignacio Londero	6–7^{(5–7)}, 2–6
Win	17–14	Dec 2013	Venezuela F9, Caracas	Futures	Clay	(Venezuela) Piero Luisi	(Argentina) Juan Ignacio Londero (Argentina) Mateo Nicolás Martínez	6–3, 6–4
Win	18–14	Mar 2014	Salinas, Ecuador	Challenger	Clay	(Brazil) Fernando Romboli	(Bolivia) Hugo Dellien (Argentina) Eduardo Schwank	6–3, 6–4
Win	19–14	Jun 2014	Padova, Italy	Challenger	Clay	(Argentina) Andrés Molteni	(Argentina) Guillermo Durán (Argentina) Máximo González	6–2, 3–6, [10–8]
Loss	19–15	Aug 2014	Prague, Czech Republic	Challenger	Clay	(Mexico) Miguel Ángel Reyes-Varela	(Croatia) Toni Androić (Russia) Andrey Kuznetsov	5–7, 5–7
Loss	19–16	Sep 2014	Medellín, Colombia	Challenger	Clay	(Argentina) Andrés Molteni	(United States) Austin Krajicek (Mexico) César Ramírez	3–6, 5–7
Loss	19–17	Nov 2014	Lima, Peru	Challenger	Clay	(Brazil) Marcelo Demoliner	(Peru) Sergio Galdós (Argentina) Guido Pella	3–6, 1–6
Win	20–17	Feb 2015	Santo Domingo, Dominican Republic	Challenger	Clay	(Chile) Hans Podlipnik Castillo	(Monaco) Romain Arneodo (Monaco) Benjamin Balleret	6–3, 2–6, [10–4]
Loss	20–18	Feb 2015	Morelos, Mexico	Challenger	Hard	(Ecuador) Emilio Gómez	(Philippines) Ruben Gonzales (United Kingdom) Darren Walsh	6–4, 3–6, [10–12]
Win	21–18	Apr 2015	Santos, Brazil	Challenger	Clay	(Argentina) Máximo González	(Argentina) Andrés Molteni (Argentina) Guido Pella	6–4, 7–6^{(7–4)}
Loss	21–19	May 2015	Cali, Colombia	Challenger	Clay	(Ecuador) Emilio Gómez	(Brazil) Marcelo Demoliner (Mexico) Miguel Ángel Reyes-Varela	1–6, 2–6
Loss	21–20	Jun 2015	Prague, Czech Republic	Challenger	Clay	(Mexico) Miguel Ángel Reyes-Varela	(Poland) Mateusz Kowalczyk (Slovakia) Igor Zelenay	2–6, 6–7^{(5–7)}
Win	22–20	Jun 2016	Fürth, Germany	Challenger	Clay	(Argentina) Facundo Argüello	(Slovakia) Andrej Martin (Austria) Tristan-Samuel Weissborn	6–3, 6–4
Win	23–20	Jun 2016	Moscow, Russia	Challenger	Clay	(Argentina) Facundo Argüello	(Georgia (country)) Aleksandre Metreveli (Kazakhstan) Dmitry Popko	6–2, 7–5
Win	24–20	Dec 2017	USA F39, Waco	Futures	Hard (i)	(Germany) Julian Lenz	(United States) Nathaniel Lammons (United States) Alex Lawson	7–6^{(7–5)}, 1–6, [14–12]
Win	25–20	Feb 2018	San Francisco, USA	Challenger	Hard (i)	(El Salvador) Marcelo Arévalo	(United Kingdom) Luke Bambridge (United Kingdom) Joe Salisbury	6–3, 6–7^{(5–7)}, [10–7]
Win	26–20	Feb 2018	Morelos, Mexico	Challenger	Hard	(Brazil) Fernando Romboli	(United States) Evan King (United States) Nathan Pasha	7–5, 6–3
Loss	26–21	Jul 2018	Winnetka, USA	Challenger	Hard	(Indonesia) Christopher Rungkat	(India) Jeevan Nedunchezhiyan (United States) Austin Krajicek	7–6^{(7–4)}, 4–6, [5–10]
Win	27–21	Aug 2018	Lexington, USA	Challenger	Hard	(United States) Robert Galloway	(Belgium) Joris De Loore (Australia) Marc Polmans	6–3, 6–1
Win	28–21	Oct 2018	Las Vegas, USA	Challenger	Hard	(El Salvador) Marcelo Arévalo	(United States) Robert Galloway (United States) Nathan Pasha	6–3, 6–3
Win	29–21	Apr 2019	Tallahassee, USA	Challenger	Clay	(Brazil) Fernando Romboli	(United States) Thai-Son Kwiatkowski (United States) Noah Rubin	6–2, 4–6, [10–7]
Win	30–21	May 2019	Savannah, USA	Challenger	Clay	(Brazil) Fernando Romboli	(France) Manuel Guinard (France) Arthur Rinderknech	6–7^{(5–7)}, 6–4, [11–9]
Win	31–21	Jun 2019	Columbus, USA	Challenger	Hard (i)	(United States) Jackson Withrow	(Mexico) Hans Hach (United States) Donald Young	6–7^{(4–7)}, 7–6^{(7–2)}, [10–5]
Loss	31–22	Aug 2019	Lexington, USA	Challenger	Hard	(United States) Jackson Withrow	(Ecuador) Diego Hidalgo (United States) Martin Redlicki	2–6, 2–6
Win	32–22	Sep 2019	Tiburon, USA	Challenger	Hard	(United States) Robert Galloway	(Barbados) Darian King (United States) JC Aragone	6–2, 7–5

== Sources ==
- Roberto Maytín at the Association of Tennis Professionals
- Roberto Maytín at World Tennis
