= Hoff Open =

- 2016 Hoff Open

Defunct tennis tournament
- Location: Moscow, Russia
- Venue: National Tennis Center of Juan Antonio Samaranch
- Category: ATP Challenger Tour
- Surface: Clay / Outdoors
- Draw: 32S/32Q/16D
- Prize money: $75,000+H
- Website: Official website

The Hoff Open was a tennis tournament held in Moscow, Russia in 2015 and 2016. The event was part of the ATP Challenger Tour and is played on outdoor clay courts.

== Past finals ==
=== Singles ===
Year	Champion	Runner-up	Score
2016	(Kazakhstan) Mikhail Kukushkin	(Canada) Steven Diez	6–3, 6–3
2015	(Spain) Daniel Muñoz de la Nava	(Moldova) Radu Albot	6–0, 6–1

=== Doubles ===
Year	Champions	Runners-up	Score
2016	(Argentina) Facundo Argüello (Venezuela) Roberto Maytín	(Georgia (country)) Aleksandre Metreveli (Kazakhstan) Dmitry Popko	6–2, 7–5
2015	(Argentina) Renzo Olivo (Argentina) Horacio Zeballos	(Chile) Julio Peralta (United States) Matt Seeberger	7–5, 6–3
