= 2014 Astana Challenger – Doubles =

Doubles
- 2014 Astana Challenger

Final
- Champions: (Belarus) Sergey Betov (Belarus) Alexander Bury
- Runners-up: (Kazakhstan) Andrey Golubev (Kazakhstan) Evgeny Korolev
- Score: 6–1, 6–4

Events
Singles	Doubles
← 2013 ·	Astana Challenger	· 2014 →

Riccardo Ghedin and Claudio Grassi were the defending champions, but not to compete.

Second seeds Sergey Betov and Alexander Bury won the title over the local team of Andrey Golubev and Evgeny Korolev, 6–1, 6–4 in the final.

== Seeds ==
1. (Russia) Konstantin Kravchuk / (Ukraine) Denys Molchanov (quarterfinals)
2. (Belarus) Sergey Betov / (Belarus) Alexander Bury (champions)
3. (Uzbekistan) Farrukh Dustov / (Italy) Matteo Volante (quarterfinals)
4. (Czech Republic) Jan Mertl / (Czech Republic) Jaroslav Pospíšil (quarterfinals)

== Draw ==
=== Key ===
- Q = Qualifier
- WC = Wild card
- LL = Lucky loser
- Alt = Alternate
- SE = Special exempt
- PR = Protected ranking
- ITF = ITF entry
- JE = Junior exempt
- w/o = Walkover
- r = Retired
- d = Defaulted
- SR = Special ranking

=== Draw ===
First round
1	(Russia) K Kravchuk (Ukraine) D Molchanov	6	6
(Serbia) F Krajinović (Serbia) G Tošić	1	3
(Italy) F Cipolla (Italy) M Viola	1	3
(Kazakhstan) A Golubev (Kazakhstan) E Korolev	6	6
3	(Uzbekistan) F Dustov (Italy) Matteo Volante	7^{7}	6
(United Kingdom) J Delgado (Luxembourg) G Müller	6^{4}	2
WC	(Kazakhstan) T Khabibulin (Kazakhstan) Serizhan Yessenbekov	1	1
(Russia) A Kudryavtsev (Belarus) D Zhyrmont	6	6
(Russia) V Baluda (Israel) A Weintraub	7^{7}	7^{7}
(Slovakia) M Semjan (Slovakia) Adrian Sikora	6^{3}	6^{5}
WC	(Kazakhstan) Sagadat Ayap (Kazakhstan) R Khassanov	3	3
4	(Czech Republic) J Mertl (Czech Republic) J Pospíšil	6	6
WC	(Belarus) I Ivashka (Kazakhstan) D Yevseyev	3	6	[10]
(France) Jules Marie (Austria) M Neuchrist	6	1	[8]
(Belarus) E Gerasimov (Kazakhstan) A Karatsev	3	3
2	(Belarus) S Betov (Belarus) A Bury	6	6

Quarterfinals
1	(Russia) K Kravchuk (Ukraine) D Molchanov	6	5	[6]
(Kazakhstan) A Golubev (Kazakhstan) E Korolev	3	7	[10]
3	(Uzbekistan) F Dustov (Italy) M Volante	5	7^{7}	[7]
(Russia) A Kudryavtsev (Belarus) D Zhyrmont	7	6^{5}	[10]
(Russia) V Baluda (Israel) A Weintraub	7	7
4	(Czech Republic) J Mertl (Czech Republic) J Pospíšil	5	5
WC	(Belarus) I Ivashka (Kazakhstan) D Yevseyev	3	2
2	(Belarus) S Betov (Belarus) A Bury	6	6

Semifinals
(Kazakhstan) A Golubev (Kazakhstan) E Korolev	6	6
(Russia) A Kudryavtsev (Belarus) D Zhyrmont	4	2
(Russia) V Baluda (Israel) A Weintraub	3	6	2
2	(Belarus) S Betov (Belarus) A Bury	6	1	[10]

Final
(Kazakhstan) A Golubev (Kazakhstan) E Korolev	1	4
2	(Belarus) S Betov (Belarus) A Bury	6	6
