= 2014 Astana Challenger – Singles =

Singles
- 2014 Astana Challenger

Final
- Champion: (Kazakhstan) Andrey Golubev
- Runner-up: (Luxembourg) Gilles Müller
- Score: 6–4, 6–4

Events
Singles	Doubles
← 2013 ·	Astana Challenger	· 2014 →

Dudi Sela was the defending champion, but chose to compete at the 2014 Delray Beach International Tennis Championships.

Andrey Golubev won the title, defeating Gilles Müller in the final, 6–4, 6–4.

== Seeds ==
1. (Kazakhstan) Andrey Golubev (champion)
2. (Italy) Matteo Viola (quarterfinals)
3. (Russia) Konstantin Kravchuk (first round)
4. (Turkey) Marsel İlhan (quarterfinals)
5. (Italy) Flavio Cipolla (second round)
6. (Czech Republic) Jan Mertl (second round)
7. (Russia) Alexander Kudryavtsev (quarterfinals)
8. (Czech Republic) Jaroslav Pospíšil (first round)

== Draw ==
=== Key ===
- Q = Qualifier
- WC = Wild card
- LL = Lucky loser
- Alt = Alternate
- SE = Special exempt
- PR = Protected ranking
- ITF = ITF entry
- JE = Junior exempt
- w/o = Walkover
- r = Retired
- d = Defaulted
- SR = Special ranking

=== Finals ===
Semifinals
1	(Kazakhstan) Andrey Golubev	3	6	6
Q	(Georgia (country)) Nikoloz Basilashvili	6	2	1
PR	(Luxembourg) Gilles Müller	6	7^{7}
(Uzbekistan) Farrukh Dustov	3	6^{4}

Final
1	(Kazakhstan) Andrey Golubev	6	6
PR	(Luxembourg) Gilles Müller	4	4

=== Top half ===
First round
1	(Kazakhstan) A Golubev	6	7^{7}
(Slovakia) Adrian Sikora	1	6^{4}
(Slovakia) M Semjan	6^{3}	3
(Kazakhstan) E Korolev	7^{7}	6
(Ukraine) D Molchanov	6	6
(Israel) A Weintraub	1	3
Q	(Georgia (country)) A Metreveli	5	3
7	(Russia) A Kudryavtsev	7	6
3	(Russia) K Kravchuk	7^{8}	6^{4}	4
(France) Jules Marie	6^{6}	7^{7}	6
Q	(Georgia (country)) N Basilashvili	7	3	7^{7}
(Kazakhstan) A Karatsev	3	6	6^{3}
(Serbia) F Krajinović	7^{7}	6
(Belarus) A Bury	6^{0}	2
Q	(Russia) V Baluda	6^{1}	2
5	(Italy) F Cipolla	7^{7}	6

Second round
1	(Kazakhstan) A Golubev	6	6
(Kazakhstan) E Korolev	1	1
(Ukraine) D Molchanov	5	4
7	(Russia) A Kudryavtsev	7	6
(France) J Marie	2	6^{5}
Q	(Georgia (country)) N Basilashvili	6	7^{7}
(Serbia) F Krajinović	6	6
5	(Italy) F Cipolla	4	1

Quarterfinals
1	(Kazakhstan) A Golubev	6	6
7	(Russia) A Kudryavtsev	1	2
Q	(Georgia (country)) N Basilashvili	6	7
(Serbia) F Krajinović	3	5

Semifinals
1	(Kazakhstan) A Golubev	3	6	6
Q	(Georgia (country)) N Basilashvili	6	2	1

=== Bottom half ===
First round
8	(Czech Republic) J Pospíšil	6^{5}	5
PR	(Luxembourg) G Müller	7^{7}	7
(Belarus) E Gerasimov	4	6	6
Q	(Russia) A Vatutin	6	3	4
WC	(Kazakhstan) D Yevseyev	4	6	6
WC	(Kazakhstan) T Khabibulin	6	4	1
(Russia) A Lobkov	2	4
4	(Turkey) M İlhan	6	6
6	(Czech Republic) J Mertl	6	4	6
(Russia) M Biryukov	4	6	4
(Uzbekistan) F Dustov	6	6
WC	(Russia) K Khachanov	3	4
WC	(Kazakhstan) Kuatbek Abiyev	4	1
(Belarus) D Zhyrmont	6	6
(Austria) M Neuchrist	4	5
2	(Italy) M Viola	6	7

Second round
PR	(Luxembourg) G Müller	6	6
(Belarus) E Gerasimov	4	4
WC	(Kazakhstan) D Yevseyev	6	3	3
4	(Turkey) M İlhan	3	6	6
6	(Czech Republic) J Mertl	6	6^{5}	4
(Uzbekistan) F Dustov	4	7^{7}	6
(Belarus) D Zhyrmont	6	5	1
2	(Italy) M Viola	4	6	6

Quarterfinals
PR	(Luxembourg) G Müller	7^{9}	6
4	(Turkey) M İlhan	6^{7}	2
(Uzbekistan) F Dustov	7^{7}	4	6
2	(Italy) M Viola	6^{3}	6	3

Semifinals
PR	(Luxembourg) G Müller	6	7^{7}
(Uzbekistan) F Dustov	3	6^{4}
