= 2015 President's Cup =

2015 President's Cup may refer to:

- 2015 President of Ireland's Cup, football
- 2015 President's Cup (Maldives), football
- 2015 President's Cup (tennis)
