= 2013 President's Cup (tennis) =

- Date: 22–28 July
- Edition: 7th (men) / 5th (women)
- Draw: 32S / 16D
- Prize money: $125,000 (men) / $100,000 (women)
- Surface: Hard
- Location: Astana, Kazakhstan

Champions

Men's singles
- (Israel) Dudi Sela

Women's singles
- (Ukraine) Nadiya Kichenok

Men's doubles
- (Italy) Riccardo Ghedin / (Italy) Claudio Grassi

Women's doubles
- (Ukraine) Lyudmyla Kichenok / (Ukraine) Nadiya Kichenok
- President's Cup (tennis)

The 2013 President's Cup (tennis) was a professional tennis tournament played on outdoor hard courts. It was the 7th edition for men and the 5th edition for women of the tournament and was part of the 2013 ITF Women's Circuit and the 2013 ATP Challenger Tour, offering prize money of $125,000 for men and $100,000 for women. It took place in Astana, Kazakhstan, on 22–28 July 2013.

== ATP singles main draw entrants ==
=== Seeds ===
| Country | Player | Rank^{1} | Seed |
|---|---|---|---|
| ISR | Dudi Sela | 95 | 1 |
| RUS | Teymuraz Gabashvili | 129 | 2 |
| KAZ | Andrey Golubev | 142 | 3 |
| RUS | Konstantin Kravchuk | 171 | 4 |
| TUR | Marsel İlhan | 175 | 5 |
| KAZ | Mikhail Kukushkin | 180 | 6 |
| UKR | Ivan Sergeyev | 198 | 7 |
| BLR | Dzmitry Zhyrmont | 203 | 8 |

=== Other entrants ===
The following players received wildcards into the singles main draw:

- (Kazakhstan) Timur Khabibulin
- (Kazakhstan) Alexey Nesterov
- (Kazakhstan) Dmitry Popko
- (Kazakhstan) Denis Yevseyev

The following players received entry from the qualifying draw:

- (Belarus) Egor Gerasimov
- (Russia) Aslan Karatsev
- (Russia) Alexander Kudryavtsev
- (Russia) Mikhail Ledovskikh

The following player received entry by a lucky loser:

- (Russia) Mikhail Biryukov

== WTA singles main draw entrants ==
=== Seeds ===
| Country | Player | Rank^{1} | Seed |
|---|---|---|---|
| POR | Maria João Koehler | 117 | 1 |
| THA | Luksika Kumkhum | 118 | 2 |
| RUS | Nina Bratchikova | 140 | 3 |
| RUS | Alexandra Panova | 141 | 4 |
| TUR | Çağla Büyükakçay | 142 | 5 |
| KAZ | Ksenia Pervak | 144 | 6 |
| THA | Tamarine Tanasugarn | 157 | 7 |
| RUS | Ekaterina Bychkova | 164 | 8 |

- ^{1} Rankings as of 15 July 2013

=== Other entrants ===
The following players received wildcards into the singles main draw:

- (Kazakhstan) Asiya Dair
- (Kazakhstan) Kamila Kerimbayeva
- (Kazakhstan) Ksenia Pervak
- (Kazakhstan) Anastasiya Yepisheva

The following players received entry from the qualifying draw:

- (Russia) Yana Buchina
- (Russia) Varvara Flink
- (Russia) Ksenia Kirillova
- (Russia) Eugeniya Pashkova

== Champions ==
=== Men's singles ===
- (Israel) Dudi Sela def. (Kazakhstan) Mikhail Kukushkin 5–7, 6–2, 7–6^{(8–6)}

=== Women's singles ===
- (Ukraine) Nadiya Kichenok def. (Portugal) Maria João Koehler 6–4, 7–5

=== Men's doubles ===
- (Italy) Riccardo Ghedin / (Italy) Claudio Grassi def. (Kazakhstan) Andrey Golubev / (Kazakhstan) Mikhail Kukushkin 3–6, 6–3, [10–8]

=== Women's doubles ===
- (Ukraine) Lyudmyla Kichenok / (Ukraine) Nadiya Kichenok def. (Russia) Nina Bratchikova / (Russia) Valeria Solovyeva 6–2, 6–2
