= 2014 President's Cup =

2014 President's Cup may refer to:

- 2014 President of Ireland's Cup, football
- 2014 President's Cup (Maldives)
- 2014 President's Cup (tennis)
