= 2013 President's Cup – Women's doubles =

Women's doubles
- 2013 President's Cup (tennis)

Final
- Champions: (Ukraine) Lyudmyla Kichenok (Ukraine) Nadiya Kichenok
- Runners-up: (Russia) Nina Bratchikova (Russia) Valeria Solovyeva
- Score: 6–2, 6–2

Events
Singles	men	women
Doubles	men	women
- President's Cup (tennis)

Oksana Kalashnikova and Marta Sirotkina were the defending champions, having won the event in 2012, but both players chose not to defend their title.

Lyudmyla and Nadiya Kichenok won the title, defeating Nina Bratchikova and Valeria Solovyeva in the final, 6–2, 6–2.

== Seeds ==
1. (Russia) Nina Bratchikova / (Russia) Valeria Solovyeva (final)
2. (Poland) Paula Kania / (Russia) Alexandra Panova (semifinals)
3. (Thailand) Luksika Kumkhum / (Thailand) Tamarine Tanasugarn (semifinals)
4. (Ukraine) Lyudmyla Kichenok / (Ukraine) Nadiya Kichenok (champions)

== Draw ==
Key

- Q = Qualifier
- WC = Wild card
- LL = Lucky loser
- Alt = Alternate
- ITF = ITF entry
- PR = Protected ranking
- SR = Special ranking
- SE = Special exempt
- JE = Junior exempt
- JR = Junior Accelerator Programme entrant
- CO = College Accelerator Programme entrant
- NG = Next Gen Accelerator Program entrant
- w/o = Walkover
- r = Retired
- d = Defaulted

First round
1	(Russia) N Bratchikova (Russia) V Solovyeva	6	6
(Russia) E Bychkova (Russia) E Pashkova	1	2
WC	(Russia) S Smagina (Kazakhstan) A Yepisheva	3	0
(Ukraine) Y Beygelzimer (Turkey) Ç Büyükakçay	6	6
3	(Thailand) L Kumkhum (Thailand) T Tanasugarn	6	6
(Kyrgyzstan) K Palkina (Georgia (country)) S Shapatava	2	3
(Kazakhstan) K Kerimbayeva (China) Z Yang	2	2
(Russia) V Flink (France) A Lim	6	6
WC	(Kazakhstan) A Grinchishina (Kazakhstan) Y Nemchen	0	6^{5}
WC	(Kazakhstan) A Dair (Kazakhstan) E Klyueva	6	7^{7}
(Russia) K Kirillova (Russia) P Monova	4	2
4	(Ukraine) L Kichenok (Ukraine) N Kichenok	6	6
(Thailand) N Lertcheewakarn (Thailand) V Wongteanchai	6	6
(Portugal) MJ Koehler (Kazakhstan) K Pervak	1	0
(Kazakhstan) A Danilina (Slovakia) M Hončová	3	2
2	(Poland) P Kania (Russia) A Panova	6	6

Quarterfinals
1	(Russia) N Bratchikova (Russia) V Solovyeva	6	6
(Ukraine) Y Beygelzimer (Turkey) Ç Büyükakçay	3	2
3	(Thailand) L Kumkhum (Thailand) T Tanasugarn	6^{4}	6	[10]
(Russia) V Flink (France) A Lim	7^{7}	2	[7]
WC	(Kazakhstan) A Dair (Kazakhstan) E Klyueva	1	0
4	(Ukraine) L Kichenok (Ukraine) N Kichenok	6	6
(Thailand) N Lertcheewakarn (Thailand) V Wongteanchai	1	0
2	(Poland) P Kania (Russia) A Panova	6	6

Semifinals
1	(Russia) N Bratchikova (Russia) V Solovyeva	5	6	[10]
3	(Thailand) L Kumkhum (Thailand) T Tanasugarn	7	4	[6]
4	(Ukraine) L Kichenok (Ukraine) N Kichenok	7	1	[12]
2	(Poland) P Kania (Russia) A Panova	5	6	[10]

Final
1	(Russia) N Bratchikova (Russia) V Solovyeva	2	2
4	(Ukraine) L Kichenok (Ukraine) N Kichenok	6	6
