= 2009 President's Cup – Singles =

Singles
- 2009 President's Cup

Final
- Champion: (Kazakhstan) Andrey Golubev
- Runner-up: (Ukraine) Illya Marchenko
- Score: 6–3, 6–3

Events
Singles	Doubles
- President's Cup

Andrey Golubev successfully defended his last year's title. He defeated Illya Marchenko 6–3, 6–3 in the final match.

== Seeds ==
1. (Uzbekistan) Denis Istomin (second round)
2. (Russia) Teymuraz Gabashvili (second round)
3. (Germany) Björn Phau (semifinals)
4. (France) Stéphane Robert (quarterfinals)
5. (France) Laurent Recouderc (second round)
6. (Kazakhstan) Andrey Golubev (champion)
7. (Ukraine) Oleksandr Dolgopolov Jr. (first round)
8. (Kazakhstan) Mikhail Kukushkin (quarterfinals)

== Draw ==
Key

- Q = Qualifier
- WC = Wild card
- LL = Lucky loser
- Alt = Alternate
- ITF = ITF entry
- PR = Protected ranking
- SR = Special ranking
- SE = Special exempt
- JE = Junior exempt
- JR = Junior Accelerator Programme entrant
- CO = College Accelerator Programme entrant
- NG = Next Gen Accelerator Program entrant
- w/o = Walkover
- r = Retired
- d = Defaulted

=== Finals ===
Semifinals
(Ukraine) Illya Marchenko	6	6
3	(Germany) Björn Phau	3	4
6	(Kazakhstan) Andrey Golubev	4	6	6
Q	(Russia) Konstantin Kravchuk	6	3	3

Final
(Ukraine) Illya Marchenko	3	3
6	(Kazakhstan) Andrey Golubev	6	6

=== Top half ===
First round
1	(Uzbekistan) D Istomin	6	6
Q	(Russia) I Belyaev	2	4
Q	(Russia) A Kumanstsov	4	3
(Ukraine) I Marchenko	6	6
(Slovakia) M Semjan	6	7
WC	(Russia) A Kuznetsov	4	6^{6}
(Kazakhstan) A Kedryuk	2	4
5	(France) L Recouderc	6	6
3	(Germany) B Phau	6	6
WC	(Kazakhstan) D Braun	1	2
(Israel) N Okun	6	6
(Ukraine) I Sergeyev	3	2
(United States) L Cook	3	1
(Russia) E Kirillov	6	6
Q	(Russia) E Donskoy	6	7
7	(Ukraine) O Dolgopolov Jr.	2	6^{5}

Second round
1	(Uzbekistan) D Istomin	3	6	6^{4}
(Ukraine) I Marchenko	6	3	7
(Slovakia) M Semjan	7	6
5	(France) L Recouderc	6^{5}	4
3	(Germany) B Phau	6	7
(Israel) N Okun	3	5
(Russia) E Kirillov	4	6	6^{5}
Q	(Russia) E Donskoy	6	3	7

Quarterfinals
(Ukraine) I Marchenko	6	6
(Slovakia) M Semjan	4	1
3	(Germany) B Phau	6^{6}	7	6
Q	(Russia) E Donskoy	7	5	2

Semifinals
(Ukraine) I Marchenko	6	6
3	(Germany) B Phau	3	4

=== Bottom half ===
First round
6	(Kazakhstan) A Golubev	6	6
(Russia) V Rudnev	2	1
WC	(Kazakhstan) A Nesterov	0	3
(Romania) P-A Luncanu	6	6
(Turkey) M İlhan	6	6
(Ukraine) S Bubka	4	1
(Kazakhstan) Y Schukin	3	5
4	(France) S Robert	6	7
8	(Kazakhstan) M Kukushkin	6	6
(Canada) P-L Duclos	4	3
(Netherlands) R Sluiter	6	6
WC	(Kazakhstan) S Abdukhalikov	4	0
(Austria) R Eitzinger	4	1
Q	(Russia) K Kravchuk	6	6
(Russia) M Elgin	1	4
2	(Russia) T Gabashvili	6	6

Second round
6	(Kazakhstan) A Golubev	6	6
(Romania) P-A Luncanu	4	2
(Turkey) M İlhan	4	1
4	(France) S Robert	6	6
8	(Kazakhstan) M Kukushkin	7	6
(Netherlands) R Sluiter	5	4
Q	(Russia) K Kravchuk	2	7	6
2	(Russia) T Gabashvili	6	5	4

Quarterfinals
6	(Kazakhstan) A Golubev	7	7
4	(France) S Robert	6^{5}	6^{5}
8	(Kazakhstan) M Kukushkin	3	7	5
Q	(Russia) K Kravchuk	6	5	7

Semifinals
6	(Kazakhstan) A Golubev	4	6	6
Q	(Russia) K Kravchuk	6	3	3
