= 2009 President's Cup (tennis) =

- Date: 2–8 November
- Edition: 4th
- Surface: Hard
- Location: Astana, Kazakhstan

Champions

Singles
- (Kazakhstan) Andrey Golubev

Doubles
- (United Kingdom) Jonathan Marray / (United Kingdom) Jamie Murray
| ← 2008 · | President's Cup (tennis) | · 2010 → |

The 2009 President's Cup was a professional tennis tournament played on indoor hard courts. It was the fourth edition of the tournament which was part of the 2009 ATP Challenger Tour. It took place in Astana, Kazakhstan between 2 and 8 November 2009.

== ATP entrants ==
=== Seeds ===
| Country | Player | Rank^{1} | Seed |
|---|---|---|---|
| UZB | Denis Istomin | 101 | 1 |
| RUS | Teymuraz Gabashvili | 102 | 2 |
| GER | Björn Phau | 110 | 3 |
| FRA | Stéphane Robert | 120 | 4 |
| FRA | Laurent Recouderc | 124 | 5 |
| KAZ | Andrey Golubev | 139 | 6 |
| UKR | Oleksandr Dolgopolov Jr. | 142 | 7 |
| KAZ | Mikhail Kukushkin | 143 | 8 |

- Rankings are as of October 26, 2009.

=== Other entrants ===
The following players received wildcards into the singles main draw:

- (Kazakhstan) Syrym Abdulkhalikov
- (Kazakhstan) Danjil Braun
- (Russia) Andrey Kuznetsov
- (Kazakhstan) Alexey Nesterov

The following players received entry from the qualifying draw:

- (Russia) Ilya Belyaev
- (Russia) Evgeny Donskoy
- (Russia) Konstantin Kravchuk
- (Russia) Andrey Kumantsov

== Champions ==
=== Singles ===
(Kazakhstan) Andrey Golubev def. (Ukraine) Illya Marchenko, 6–3, 6–3

=== Doubles ===
(United Kingdom) Jonathan Marray / (United Kingdom) Jamie Murray def. (United States) David Martin / (Netherlands) Rogier Wassen, 4–6, 6–3, [10–5]
