= 2014 President's Cup (tennis) =

- Date: 21–27 July
- Edition: 9th (men); 6th (women)
- Category: ATP Challenger Tour; ITF Women's Circuit
- Prize money: $125,000 (men) $100,000 (women)
- Surface: Hard
- Location: Astana, Kazakhstan

Champions

Men's singles
- (Lithuania) Ričardas Berankis

Women's singles
- (Russia) Vitalia Diatchenko

Men's doubles
- (Ukraine) Sergei Bubka / (Switzerland) Marco Chiudinelli

Women's doubles
- (Russia) Vitalia Diatchenko / (Russia) Margarita Gasparyan
- President's Cup (tennis)

The 2014 President's Cup was a professional tennis tournament played on outdoor hard courts. It was the ninth edition of the tournament for men (second of the year on account of the 2014 Astana Challenger) and the sixth edition for women, part of the 2014 ATP Challenger Tour and the 2014 ITF Women's Circuit respectively. Offering prize money of $125,000 for the men and $100,000 for the women, the events took place in Astana, Kazakhstan, on 21–27 July 2014.

== Men's singles main draw entrants ==
=== Seeds ===
Country	Player	Rank^{1}	Seed
KAZ	Mikhail Kukushkin	53	1
SLO	Blaž Kavčič	75	2
LIT	Ričardas Berankis	139	3
TUR	Marsel İlhan	141	4
RUS	Alexander Kudryavtsev	157	5
SUI	Marco Chiudinelli	173	6
ITA	Thomas Fabbiano	181	7
ESP	Adrián Menéndez-Maceiras	186	8

- ^{1} Rankings as of 14 July 2014

=== Other entrants ===
The following players received wildcards into the singles main draw:

- (Russia) Karen Khachanov
- (Kazakhstan) Dmitry Popko
- (Russia) Andrey Rublev
- (Kazakhstan) Denis Yevseyev

The following players received entry from the qualifying draw:

- (Russia) Mikhail Biryukov
- (Uzbekistan) Temur Ismailov
- (Spain) Jaime Pulgar García
- (Belarus) Yaraslav Shyla

The following player entered using a protected ranking:

- (Ukraine) Sergei Bubka

== Women's singles main draw entrants ==
=== Seeds ===
Country	Player	Rank^{1}	Seed
GER	Anna-Lena Friedsam	118	1
UKR	Nadiia Kichenok	119	2
TUR	Çağla Büyükakçay	153	3
RUS	Marta Sirotkina	154	4
RUS	Ekaterina Bychkova	155	5
UKR	Lyudmyla Kichenok	157	6
RUS	Polina Vinogradova	203	7
KAZ	Yulia Putintseva	204	8

- ^{1} Rankings as of 14 July 2014

=== Other entrants ===
The following players received wildcards into the singles main draw:

- (Russia) Anastasia Bukhanko
- (Kazakhstan) Anna Danilina
- (Kazakhstan) Alexandra Grinchishina
- (Kazakhstan) Ekaterina Klyueva

The following players received entry from the qualifying draw:

- (Ukraine) Olga Ianchuk
- (Russia) Veronika Kudermetova
- (Belarus) Sviatlana Pirazhenka
- (Turkey) İpek Soylu

The following players entered using a protected ranking:

- (Uzbekistan) Akgul Amanmuradova
- (Russia) Evgeniya Rodina
- (Croatia) Ana Savić

== Champions ==
=== Men's singles ===
- (Lithuania) Ričardas Berankis def. (Turkey) Marsel İlhan 7–5, 5–7, 6–3

=== Women's singles ===
- (Russia) Vitalia Diatchenko def. (Turkey) Çağla Büyükakçay 6–4, 3–6, 6–2

=== Men's doubles ===
- (Ukraine) Sergei Bubka / (Switzerland) Marco Chiudinelli def. (Chinese Taipei) Chen Ti / (Chinese Taipei) Huang Liang-chi 6–3, 6–4

=== Women's doubles ===
- (Russia) Vitalia Diatchenko / (Russia) Margarita Gasparyan def. (Belgium) Michaela Boev / (Germany) Anna-Lena Friedsam 6–4, 6–1
