= 2016 President's Cup =

2016 President's Cup may refer to:

- 2016 President of Ireland's Cup, in football
- 2016 President's Cup (Maldives), in football
- 2016 President's Cup (tennis)
