= 2016 President's Cup – Men's doubles =

Men's doubles
- 2016 President's Cup (tennis)

Final
- Champions: (Belarus) Yaraslav Shyla (Belarus) Andrei Vasilevski
- Runners-up: (Russia) Mikhail Elgin (Russia) Alexander Kudryavtsev
- Score: 6–4, 6–4

Events
Singles	men	women
Doubles	men	women
- President's Cup (tennis)

Konstantin Kravchuk and Denys Molchanov were the defending champions but lost in the first round to Toshihide Matsui and Vishnu Vardhan.

Yaraslav Shyla and Andrei Vasilevski won the title after defeating Mikhail Elgin and Alexander Kudryavtsev 6–4, 6–4 in the final.

== Seeds ==
1. (Russia) Konstantin Kravchuk / (Ukraine) Denys Molchanov (first round)
2. (Russia) Mikhail Elgin / (Russia) Alexander Kudryavtsev (final)
3. (Chinese Taipei) Chen Ti / (China) Li Zhe (first round)
4. (Belarus) Yaraslav Shyla / (Belarus) Andrei Vasilevski (champions)

== Draw ==
Key

- Q = Qualifier
- WC = Wild card
- LL = Lucky loser
- Alt = Alternate
- ITF = ITF entry
- PR = Protected ranking
- SR = Special ranking
- SE = Special exempt
- JE = Junior exempt
- JR = Junior Accelerator Programme entrant
- CO = College Accelerator Programme entrant
- NG = Next Gen Accelerator Program entrant
- w/o = Walkover
- r = Retired
- d = Defaulted

First round
1	(Russia) K Kravchuk (Ukraine) D Molchanov	3	6	[7]
(Japan) T Matsui (India) V Vardhan	6	4	[10]
(Belarus) M Dubarenco (Belarus) I Ivashka	6	3	[5]
(Russia) A Bublik (Russia) D Medvedev	1	6	[10]
4	(Belarus) Y Shyla (Belarus) A Vasilevski	2	6	[11]
(Colombia) N Barrientos (Russia) D Matsukevich	6	3	[9]
(Italy) A Bega (South Korea) D-h Lee	3	6	[10]
(United States) JP Fruttero (Chinese Taipei) J Jung	6	4	[3]
(Serbia) M Janković (Kazakhstan) D Popko	6	3	[10]
WC	(Kazakhstan) A Kedryuk (Kazakhstan) D Yevseyev	3	6	[4]
(Italy) Edoardo Eremin (Belarus) D Zhyrmont	7	4	[10]
3	(Chinese Taipei) T Chen (China) Z Li	5	6	[6]
(Switzerland) L Margaroli (Spain) D Pérez Sanz	6	6
WC	(Uzbekistan) T Ismailov (Kazakhstan) T Khabibulin	2	4
WC	(Kazakhstan) Sagadat Ayap (Kazakhstan) R Khassanov	0	2
2	(Russia) M Elgin (Russia) A Kudryavtsev	6	6

Quarterfinals
(Japan) T Matsui (India) V Vardhan	6^{10}	3
(Russia) A Bublik (Russia) D Medvedev	7^{12}	6
4	(Belarus) Y Shyla (Belarus) A Vasilevski	7	6
(Italy) A Bega (South Korea) D-h Lee	5	3
(Serbia) M Janković (Kazakhstan) D Popko	7	6^{3}	[10]
(Italy) E Eremin (Belarus) D Zhyrmont	5	7^{7}	[7]
(Switzerland) L Margaroli (Spain) D Pérez Sanz	0	3
2	(Russia) M Elgin (Russia) A Kudryavtsev	6	6

Semifinals
(Russia) A Bublik (Russia) D Medvedev	3	4
4	(Belarus) Y Shyla (Belarus) A Vasilevski	6	6
(Serbia) M Janković (Kazakhstan) D Popko
2	(Russia) M Elgin (Russia) A Kudryavtsev	w/o

Final
4	(Belarus) Y Shyla (Belarus) A Vasilevski	6	6
2	(Russia) M Elgin (Russia) A Kudryavtsev	4	4
