= 2024 President's Cup – Men's singles =

Men's singles
- 2024 President's Cup

Final
- Champion: (Bulgaria) Dimitar Kuzmanov
- Runner-up: (Georgia (country)) Saba Purtseladze
- Score: 6–4, 6–3

Events
Singles	men	women
Doubles	men	women
- President's Cup

Denis Yevseyev was the defending champion but chose not to defend his title.

Dimitar Kuzmanov won the title after defeating Saba Purtseladze 6–4, 6–3 in the final.

== Seeds ==
1. (Lithuania) Ričardas Berankis (first round)
2. (Uzbekistan) Khumoyun Sultanov (first round)
3. (Bulgaria) Dimitar Kuzmanov (champion)
4. (Israel) Yshai Oliel (first round)
5. Evgeny Donskoy (quarterfinals)
6. (Turkey) Yankı Erel (second round, retired)
7. Evgeny Karlovskiy (semifinals)
8. (Czech Republic) Dominik Palán (first round)

== Draw ==
Key

- Q = Qualifier
- WC = Wild card
- LL = Lucky loser
- Alt = Alternate
- ITF = ITF entry
- PR = Protected ranking
- SR = Special ranking
- SE = Special exempt
- JE = Junior exempt
- JR = Junior Accelerator Programme entrant
- CO = College Accelerator Programme entrant
- NG = Next Gen Accelerator Program entrant
- w/o = Walkover
- r = Retired
- d = Defaulted

=== Finals ===
Semifinals
WC	(Georgia (country)) Aleksandre Bakshi	3	4
3	(Bulgaria) Dimitar Kuzmanov	6	6
7	Evgeny Karlovskiy	0	4
(Georgia (country)) Saba Purtseladze	6	6

Final
3	(Bulgaria) Dimitar Kuzmanov	6	6
(Georgia (country)) Saba Purtseladze	4	3

=== Top half ===
First round
1	(Lithuania) R Berankis	5	6	6^{5}
WC	(Georgia (country)) A Bakshi	7	3	7^{7}
(Poland) F Peliwo	7^{7}	4	6^{8}
Q	(Japan) S Watanabe	6^{3}	6	7^{10}
(Uzbekistan) S Fomin	7^{7}	6
Q	(Japan) T Yuzuki	6^{4}	1
(Israel) Orel Kimhi	3	2
6	(Turkey) Y Erel	6	6
3	(Bulgaria) D Kuzmanov	6	7^{8}
(Australia) M Bouzige	1	6^{6}
Q	Saveliy Ivanov	1	4
E Agafonov	6	6
(Norway) V Durasovic	4	2
WC	(Kazakhstan) G Lomakin	6	6
Q	P Bar Biryukov	6^{5}	4
5	E Donskoy	7^{7}	6

Second round
WC	(Georgia (country)) A Bakshi	6	6
Q	(Japan) S Watanabe	3	1
(Uzbekistan) S Fomin	5
6	(Turkey) Y Erel	4^{r}
3	(Bulgaria) D Kuzmanov	4	6	7^{7}
E Agafonov	6	4	6^{5}
WC	(Kazakhstan) G Lomakin	3	2
5	E Donskoy	6	6

Quarterfinals
WC	(Georgia (country)) A Bakshi	7^{7}	6^{3}	7^{7}
(Uzbekistan) S Fomin	6^{5}	7^{7}	6^{3}
3	(Bulgaria) D Kuzmanov	6	6
5	E Donskoy	4	3

Semifinals
WC	(Georgia (country)) A Bakshi	3	4
3	(Bulgaria) D Kuzmanov	6	6

=== Bottom half ===
First round
7	E Karlovskiy	7^{7}	7^{7}
(United States) A Ayeni	6^{3}	6^{4}
(Ukraine) V Orlov	6	6
(Israel) D Cukierman	4	3
(Austria) N Oberleitner	6	6
(Bosnia and Herzegovina) M Bašić	4	4
Q	(France) A Ghibaudo	6	3	6
4	(Israel) Y Oliel	1	6	3
8	(Czech Republic) D Palán	4	4
(Georgia (country)) S Purtseladze	6	6
WC	(Kazakhstan) A Omarkhanov	6	6
Q	Maxim Zhukov	4	4
(India) Siddharth Vishwakarma	6	6^{5}	5
I Simakin	3	7^{7}	7
(Slovakia) L Pokorný	6	6
2	(Uzbekistan) K Sultanov	4	4

Second round
7	E Karlovskiy	5	6	6
(Ukraine) V Orlov	7	4	4
(Austria) N Oberleitner	3	4
Q	(France) A Ghibaudo	6	6
(Georgia (country)) S Purtseladze	6	6
WC	(Kazakhstan) A Omarkhanov	3	4
I Simakin	6^{6}	2
(Slovakia) L Pokorný	7^{8}	6

Quarterfinals
7	E Karlovskiy	7^{7}	7^{8}
Q	(France) A Ghibaudo	6^{1}	6^{6}
(Georgia (country)) S Purtseladze	6	6
(Slovakia) L Pokorný	2	3

Semifinals
7	E Karlovskiy	0	4
(Georgia (country)) S Purtseladze	6	6
