= 2009 President's Cup – Doubles =

Doubles
- 2009 President's Cup

Final
- Champions: (United Kingdom) Jonathan Marray (United Kingdom) Jamie Murray
- Runners-up: (United States) David Martin (Netherlands) Rogier Wassen
- Score: 4–6, 6–3, [10–5]

Events
Singles	Doubles
- President's Cup

Michail Elgin and Alexandre Kudryavtsev were the defending champions, but only Elgin tried to defend his title.
He partnered with Sergei Bubka, however lost to Frank Moser and Björn Phau already in the first round.
Jonathan Marray and Jamie Murray won this tournament, by defeating David Martin and Rogier Wassen 4–6, 6–3, [10–5] in the final match.

== Seeds ==
1. (United States) David Martin / (Netherlands) Rogier Wassen (final)
2. (United Kingdom) Jonathan Marray / (United Kingdom) Jamie Murray (champions)
3. (Ukraine) Sergei Bubka / (Russia) Michail Elgin (first round)
4. (Uzbekistan) Denis Istomin / (Kazakhstan) Alexey Kedryuk (semifinals)

== Draw ==
Key

- Q = Qualifier
- WC = Wild card
- LL = Lucky loser
- Alt = Alternate
- ITF = ITF entry
- PR = Protected ranking
- SR = Special ranking
- SE = Special exempt
- JE = Junior exempt
- JR = Junior Accelerator Programme entrant
- CO = College Accelerator Programme entrant
- NG = Next Gen Accelerator Program entrant
- w/o = Walkover
- r = Retired
- d = Defaulted

=== Draw ===
First round
1	(United States) D Martin (Netherlands) R Wassen	6	6
WC	(Kazakhstan) S Abdulkhalikov (Kazakhstan) M Kukushkin	3	4
(Austria) R Eitzinger (Slovakia) M Semjan	2	3
(Israel) N Okun (Kazakhstan) Y Schukin	6	6
3	(Ukraine) S Bubka (Russia) M Elgin	1	4
(Germany) F Moser (Germany) B Phau	6	6
(Ukraine) O Dolgopolov Jr. (Ukraine) I Sergeyev	6	3	[7]
WC	(Kazakhstan) D Braun (Kazakhstan) S Yessenbekov	3	6	[10]
(Russia) E Kirillov (Russia) K Kravchuk	6	1	[5]
(Russia) A Kumantsov (Romania) P-A Luncanu	2	6	[10]
(United States) L Cook (Canada) P-L Duclos	2	3
4	(Uzbekistan) D Istomin (Kazakhstan) A Kedryuk	6	6
(Russia) T Gabashvili (Russia) D Matsukevich	6	6
(France) L Recouderc (France) S Robert	4	4
WC	(Kazakhstan) A Nesterov (Kazakhstan) D Yevseyev	1	2
2	(United Kingdom) J Marray (United Kingdom) J Murray	6	6

Quarterfinals
1	(United States) D Martin (Netherlands) R Wassen	6	6
(Israel) N Okun (Kazakhstan) Y Schukin	3	3
(Germany) F Moser (Germany) B Phau	6	6
WC	(Kazakhstan) D Braun (Kazakhstan) S Yessenbekov	2	2
(Russia) A Kumantsov (Romania) P-A Luncanu	4	4
4	(Uzbekistan) D Istomin (Kazakhstan) A Kedryuk	6	6
(Russia) T Gabashvili (Russia) D Matsukevich	2	4
2	(United Kingdom) J Marray (United Kingdom) J Murray	6	6

Semifinals
1	(United States) D Martin (Netherlands) R Wassen	6	0	[10]
(Germany) F Moser (Germany) B Phau	3	6	[7]
4	(Uzbekistan) D Istomin (Kazakhstan) A Kedryuk	3	2
2	(United Kingdom) J Marray (United Kingdom) J Murray	6	6

Finals
1	(United States) D Martin (Netherlands) R Wassen	6	3	[5]
2	(United Kingdom) J Marray (United Kingdom) J Murray	4	6	[10]
