= 2024 President's Cup =

- Date: 15 – 21 July
- Edition: 19th (men); 15th (women)
- Category: ATP Challenger Tour; ITF Women's World Tennis Tour
- Surface: Hard / Outdoor
- Location: Astana, Kazakhstan

Champions

Men's singles
- (Bulgaria) Dimitar Kuzmanov

Women's singles
- Tatiana Prozorova

Men's doubles
- Egor Agafonov / Ilia Simakin

Women's doubles
- Anastasia Gasanova / Ekaterina Shalimova
- President's Cup

The 2024 President's Cup was a professional tennis tournament played on outdoor hard courts. It was the 19th edition of the men's tournament which was part of the 2024 ATP Challenger Tour, and the 15th edition of the women's tournament which was part of the 2024 ITF Women's World Tennis Tour. It took place in Astana, Kazakhstan between 15 and 21 July 2024.

== Champions ==
=== Men's singles ===
- (Bulgaria) Dimitar Kuzmanov def. (Georgia (country)) Saba Purtseladze 6–4, 6–3.

=== Men's doubles ===
- Egor Agafonov / Ilia Simakin def. (Uzbekistan) Denis Istomin / Evgeny Karlovskiy 6–4, 6–3.

=== Women's singles ===
- Tatiana Prozorova def. Alexandra Shubladze, 7–5, 6–7^{(5–7)}, 6–1

=== Women's doubles ===
- Anastasia Gasanova / Ekaterina Shalimova def. Vitalia Diatchenko / (Kazakhstan) Zhanel Rustemova, 7–6^{(7–4)}, 2–6, [10–7]

== Men's singles main draw entrants ==
=== Seeds ===
Country	Player	Rank^{1}	Seed
LTU	Ričardas Berankis	280	1
UZB	Khumoyun Sultanov	309	2
BUL	Dimitar Kuzmanov	323	3
ISR	Yshai Oliel	357	4
	Evgeny Donskoy	415	5
TUR	Yankı Erel	456	6
	Evgeny Karlovskiy	471	7
CZE	Dominik Palán	483	8

- ^{1} Rankings are as of 1 July 2024.

=== Other entrants ===
The following players received wildcards into the singles main draw:

- (Georgia (country)) Aleksandre Bakshi
- (Kazakhstan) Grigoriy Lomakin
- (Kazakhstan) Amir Omarkhanov

The following players received entry from the qualifying draw:

- Petr Bar Biryukov
- (France) Antoine Ghibaudo
- Saveliy Ivanov
- (Japan) Seita Watanabe
- (Japan) Takeru Yuzuki
- Maxim Zhukov

== Women's singles main draw entrants ==
=== Seeds ===
Country	Player	Rank^{1}	Seed
UZB	Nigina Abduraimova	295	1
	Tatiana Prozorova	339	2
KOR	Back Da-yeon	343	3
	Ksenia Laskutova	389	4
	Alexandra Shubladze	406	5
	Ekaterina Maklakova	424	6
	Anastasia Zolotareva	464	7
EST	Elena Malõgina	469	8

- ^{1} Rankings are as of 15 July 2024.

=== Other entrants ===
The following players received wildcards into the singles main draw:

- Vitalia Diatchenko
- (Kazakhstan) Zhanel Rustemova
- (Kazakhstan) Mariya Sinitsyna
- (Kazakhstan) Sonja Zhiyenbayeva

The following players received entry from the qualifying draw:

- Polina Bakhmutkina
- (Azerbaijan) Michelle Dzjachangirova
- Aglaya Fedorova
- Ekaterina Khayrutdinova
- (Kazakhstan) Sandugash Kenzhibayeva
- (Kazakhstan) Anastasiya Krymkova
- (Kazakhstan) Aiya Nupbay
- (Germany) Sarah-Rebecca Sekulic
