= 2024 President's Cup – Men's doubles =

Men's doubles
- 2024 President's Cup

Final
- Champions: Egor Agafonov; Ilia Simakin
- Runners-up: (Uzbekistan) Denis Istomin; Evgeny Karlovskiy
- Score: 6–4, 6–3

Events
Singles	men	women
Doubles	men	women
- President's Cup

S D Prajwal Dev and Niki Kaliyanda Poonacha were the defending champions but only Dev chose to defend his title, partnering Nitin Kumar Sinha. They lost in the first round to Aleksandre Bakshi and Zura Tkemaladze.

Egor Agafonov and Ilia Simakin won the title after defeating Denis Istomin and Evgeny Karlovskiy 6–4, 6–3 in the final.

== Seeds ==
1. (Israel) Daniel Cukierman / (Austria) Neil Oberleitner (semifinals)
2. (Japan) Seita Watanabe / (Japan) Takeru Yuzuki (semifinals)
3. Aleksandr Lobanov / (China) Wang Aoran (quarterfinals)
4. (Ukraine) Vladyslav Orlov / (Slovakia) Lukáš Pokorný (quarterfinals)

== Draw ==
Key

- Q = Qualifier
- WC = Wild card
- LL = Lucky loser
- Alt = Alternate
- ITF = ITF entry
- PR = Protected ranking
- SR = Special ranking
- SE = Special exempt
- JE = Junior exempt
- JR = Junior Accelerator Programme entrant
- CO = College Accelerator Programme entrant
- NG = Next Gen Accelerator Program entrant
- w/o = Walkover
- r = Retired
- d = Defaulted

=== Draw ===
First round
1	(Israel) D Cukierman (Austria) N Oberleitner	w/o
WC	(Kazakhstan) A Omarkhanov (Kazakhstan) Yerassyl Yerdilda
Alt	(Bulgaria) Leonid Sheyngezikht; Maxim Zhukov	3	6	[5]
Ivan Denisov (Georgia (country)) S Purtseladze	6	1	[10]
4	(Ukraine) V Orlov (Slovakia) L Pokorný	6	6
(Bosnia and Herzegovina) M Bašić (Norway) V Durasovic	3	4
(Uzbekistan) D Istomin; E Karlovskiy	6	4	[12]
(Uzbekistan) S Fomin (Kazakhstan) G Lomakin	2	6	[10]
(United States) A Ayeni (Poland) F Peliwo	0	5
E Agafonov; I Simakin	6	7
WC	(Kazakhstan) Iliyas Maratuly (Kazakhstan) Islam Orynbasar	3	0
3	Aleksandr Lobanov (China) A Wang	6	6
(India) SDP Dev (India) Nitin Kumar Sinha	6^{5}	7^{8}	[8]
(Georgia (country)) A Bakshi (Georgia (country)) Z Tkemaladze	7^{7}	6^{6}	[10]
(India) Sai Karteek Reddy Ganta (Uzbekistan) K Sultanov	4	4
2	(Japan) S Watanabe (Japan) T Yuzuki	6	6

Quarterfinals
1	(Israel) D Cukierman (Austria) N Oberleitner	7^{7}	6
I Denisov (Georgia (country)) S Purtseladze	6^{2}	1
4	(Ukraine) V Orlov (Slovakia) L Pokorný	4	6^{4}
(Uzbekistan) D Istomin; E Karlovskiy	6	7^{7}
E Agafonov; I Simakin	7^{7}	7^{7}
3	A Lobanov (China) A Wang	6^{5}	6^{4}
(Georgia (country)) A Bakshi (Georgia (country)) Z Tkemaladze	2	1
2	(Japan) S Watanabe (Japan) T Yuzuki	6	6

Semifinals
1	(Israel) D Cukierman (Austria) N Oberleitner	6	6^{5}	[7]
(Uzbekistan) D Istomin; E Karlovskiy	4	7^{7}	[10]
E Agafonov; I Simakin	7^{7}	6
2	(Japan) S Watanabe (Japan) T Yuzuki	6^{5}	2

Final
(Uzbekistan) D Istomin; E Karlovskiy	4	3
E Agafonov; I Simakin	6	6
