= 2025 President's Cup =

- Date: 28 July – 3 August (men); 4–10 August (women)
- Edition: 20th (men); 16th (women)
- Category: ATP Challenger Tour; ITF Women's World Tennis Tour
- Surface: Hard / Outdoor
- Location: Astana, Kazakhstan

Champions

Men's singles
- (Norway) Nicolai Budkov Kjær

Women's singles
- Ekaterina Maklakova

Men's doubles
- (Japan) Taisei Ichikawa / (Japan) Kokoro Isomura

Women's doubles
- (Kazakhstan) Asylzhan Arystanbekova / (Kazakhstan) Ingkar Dyussebay
- President's Cup

The 2025 President's Cup was a professional tennis tournament played on outdoor hard courts. It was the 20th edition of the men's tournament which was part of the 2025 ATP Challenger Tour, and the 16th edition of the women's tournament which was part of the 2025 ITF Women's World Tennis Tour. It took place in Astana, Kazakhstan between 28 July and 10 August 2025.

== Champions ==
=== Men's singles ===
- (Norway) Nicolai Budkov Kjær def. (Italy) Alexandr Binda 6–4, 6–3.

=== Men's doubles ===
- (Japan) Taisei Ichikawa / (Japan) Kokoro Isomura def. (Philippines) Francis Alcantara / (South Korea) Park Ui-sung 7–5, 2–6, [10–5].

=== Women's singles ===
- Ekaterina Maklakova def. Edda Mamedova 6–4, 2–6, 6–4.

=== Women's doubles ===
- (Kazakhstan) Asylzhan Arystanbekova / (Kazakhstan) Ingkar Dyussebay def. Ekaterina Khayrutdinova / Anna Kubareva 6–7^{(3–7)}, 6–4, [10–3].

== Men's singles main draw entrants ==
=== Seeds ===
Country	Player	Rank^{1}	Seed
FRA	Clément Chidekh	231	1
NOR	Nicolai Budkov Kjær	253	2
	Ivan Gakhov	256	3
GEO	Saba Purtseladze	273	4
AUS	Moerani Bouzige	337	5
	Petr Bar Biryukov	346	6
JOR	Abdullah Shelbayh	364	7
LTU	Ričardas Berankis	385	8

- ^{1} Rankings are as of 21 July 2025.

=== Other entrants ===
The following players received wildcards into the singles main draw:

- (Kazakhstan) Zangar Nurlanuly
- (Kazakhstan) Amir Omarkhanov
- (Uzbekistan) Maxim Shin

The following players received entry from the qualifying draw:

- (Turkey) Arda Azkara
- (Czech Republic) Dominik Palán
- (South Korea) Park Ui-sung
- (India) Mukund Sasikumar
- (Australia) Edward Winter
- Maxim Zhukov
