= 2013 President's Cup – Men's doubles =

Men's doubles
- 2013 President's Cup (tennis)

Final
- Champions: (Italy) Riccardo Ghedin (Italy) Claudio Grassi
- Runners-up: (Kazakhstan) Andrey Golubev (Kazakhstan) Mikhail Kukushkin
- Score: 3–6, 6–3, [10–8]

Events
Singles	men	women
Doubles	men	women
- President's Cup (tennis)

Konstantin Kravchuk and Denys Molchanov were the defending champions, but Molchanov chose not to compete Kravchuk played with Teymuraz Gabashvili but lost in the quarterfinals.
Riccardo Ghedin and Claudio Grassi won in the final against Andrey Golubev and Mikhail Kukushkin 3–6, 6–3, [10–8].

== Seeds ==
1. (United Kingdom) Brydan Klein / (Australia) Dane Propoggia (quarterfinals)
2. (Australia) Jose Statham / (India) Vishnu Vardhan (quarterfinals)
3. (Japan) Toshihide Matsui / (Thailand) Danai Udomchoke (quarterfinals)
4. (Russia) Teymuraz Gabashvili / (Russia) Konstantin Kravchuk (quarterfinals)

== Draw ==
Key

- Q = Qualifier
- WC = Wild card
- LL = Lucky loser
- Alt = Alternate
- ITF = ITF entry
- PR = Protected ranking
- SR = Special ranking
- SE = Special exempt
- JE = Junior exempt
- JR = Junior Accelerator Programme entrant
- CO = College Accelerator Programme entrant
- NG = Next Gen Accelerator Program entrant
- w/o = Walkover
- r = Retired
- d = Defaulted

=== Draw ===
First round
1	(United Kingdom) B Klein (Australia) D Propoggia	2	6	[10]
(Belarus) E Gerasimov (Belarus) D Zhyrmont	6	2	[8]
(Italy) R Ghedin (Italy) C Grassi	6	6
WC	(Kazakhstan) T Khabibulin (Kazakhstan) Dmitriy Makayev	2	3
3	(Japan) T Matsui (Thailand) D Udomchoke	6^{5}	6	[10]
Alt	(Kazakhstan) S Abdukhalikov (Kazakhstan) R Khassanov	7^{7}	2	[4]
(Chinese Taipei) T Chen (South Korea) Y-k Lim	6	6
(India) S Balaji (India) J Nedunchezhiyan	3	2
(Russia) A Kudryavtsev (Ukraine) I Sergeyev	2	7^{8}	[10]
(Russia) V Baluda (Belarus) Y Shyla	6	6^{6}	[7]
(Russia) K Dmitriev (Kazakhstan) D Yevseyev	3	2
4	(Russia) T Gabashvili (Russia) K Kravchuk	6	6
(Kazakhstan) A Golubev (Kazakhstan) M Kukushkin	6	6
WC	(Kazakhstan) Sagadat Ayap (Kazakhstan) Serizhan Yessenbekov	0	2
WC	(Kazakhstan) Alexey Nesterov (Kazakhstan) D Popko	0	5
2	(Australia) J Statham (India) V Vardhan	6	7

Quarterfinals
1	(United Kingdom) B Klein (Australia) D Propoggia	6^{5}	3
(Italy) R Ghedin (Italy) C Grassi	7^{7}	6
3	(Japan) T Matsui (Thailand) D Udomchoke	3	3
(Chinese Taipei) T Chen (South Korea) Y-k Lim	6	6
(Russia) A Kudryavtsev (Ukraine) I Sergeyev	6	6
4	(Russia) T Gabashvili (Russia) K Kravchuk	1	3
(Kazakhstan) A Golubev (Kazakhstan) M Kukushkin	7^{7}	7^{8}
2	(Australia) J Statham (India) V Vardhan	6^{4}	6^{6}

Semifinals
(Italy) R Ghedin (Italy) C Grassi	7^{7}	3	[10]
(Chinese Taipei) T Chen (South Korea) Y-k Lim	6^{5}	6	[7]
(Russia) A Kudryavtsev (Ukraine) I Sergeyev	2	4
(Kazakhstan) A Golubev (Kazakhstan) M Kukushkin	6	6

Final
(Italy) R Ghedin (Italy) C Grassi	3	6	[10]
(Kazakhstan) A Golubev (Kazakhstan) M Kukushkin	6	3	[8]
