= 2015 President's Cup – Men's doubles =

Men's doubles
- 2015 President's Cup (tennis)

Final
- Champion: (Russia) Konstantin Kravchuk (Ukraine) Denys Molchanov
- Runner-up: (South Korea) Chung Yun-seong (Uzbekistan) Jurabek Karimov
- Score: 6–2, 6–2

Events
Singles	men	women
Doubles	men	women
- President's Cup (tennis)

In the 2015 President's Cup men's doubles, Sergei Bubka and Marco Chiudinelli were the defending champions, but they did not participate this year.

Konstantin Kravchuk and Denys Molchanov won the tournament, defeating Chung Yun-seong and Jurabek Karimov in the final.

== Seeds ==
1. (Chinese Taipei) Chen Ti / (Croatia) Franko Škugor (semifinals)
2. (Russia) Konstantin Kravchuk / (Ukraine) Denys Molchanov (champions)
3. (Belarus) Yaraslau Shyla / (Belarus) Andrei Vasilevski (quarterfinals)
4. (Spain) Enrique López-Pérez / (Belgium) Yannick Mertens (first round)

== Draw ==
Key

- Q = Qualifier
- WC = Wild card
- LL = Lucky loser
- Alt = Alternate
- ITF = ITF entry
- PR = Protected ranking
- SR = Special ranking
- SE = Special exempt
- JE = Junior exempt
- JR = Junior Accelerator Programme entrant
- CO = College Accelerator Programme entrant
- NG = Next Gen Accelerator Program entrant
- w/o = Walkover
- r = Retired
- d = Defaulted

First round
(France) A Musialek (Israel) A Weintraub	7^{7}	6
WC	(Kazakhstan) Sagadat Ayap (Kazakhstan) R Khassanov	6^{4}	0
4	(Spain) E López-Pérez (Belgium) Y Mertens	6	1	[3]
WC	(South Korea) Y-s Chung (Uzbekistan) J Karimov	2	6	[10]
(Japan) H Moriya (United States) Connor Smith	6	6
WC	(Kazakhstan) Pavel Petrov (Kazakhstan) D Yevseyev	4	3
(Uzbekistan) S Fayziev (Russia) M Kalovelonis	4	6	[12]
(Belarus) M Dubarenco (Belarus) I Ivashka	6	1	[10]
(Kazakhstan) T Khabibulin (Kazakhstan) D Popko	2	1
3	(Belarus) Y Shyla (Belarus) A Vasilevski	6	6
(Uzbekistan) T Ismailov (Uzbekistan) Shonigmatjon Shofayziyev	0	6	[9]
(Ukraine) M Deviatiarov (Bulgaria) D Kuzmanov	6	2	[11]
(Kazakhstan) M Kukushkin (Russia) Vitali Reshetnikov	2	4
2	(Russia) K Kravchuk (Ukraine) D Molchanov	6	6

Quarterfinals
1	(Chinese Taipei) T Chen (Croatia) F Škugor	6	6
(France) A Musialek (Israel) A Weintraub	1	2
WC	(South Korea) Y-s Chung (Uzbekistan) J Karimov	6	6
(Japan) H Moriya (United States) C Smith	3	4
(Uzbekistan) S Fayziev (Russia) M Kalovelonis	6	2	[10]
3	(Belarus) Y Shyla (Belarus) A Vasilevski	4	6	[7]
(Ukraine) M Deviatiarov (Bulgaria) D Kuzmanov	4	4
2	(Russia) K Kravchuk (Ukraine) D Molchanov	6	6

Semifinals
1	(Chinese Taipei) T Chen (Croatia) F Škugor	0	6^{5}
WC	(South Korea) Y-s Chung (Uzbekistan) J Karimov	6	7^{7}
(Uzbekistan) S Fayziev (Russia) M Kalovelonis	6	5	[6]
2	(Russia) K Kravchuk (Ukraine) D Molchanov	3	7	[10]

Final
WC	(South Korea) Y-s Chung (Uzbekistan) J Karimov	2	2
2	(Russia) K Kravchuk (Ukraine) D Molchanov	6	6
