= 2025 President's Cup – Men's doubles =

Men's doubles
- 2025 President's Cup

Final
- Champions: (Japan) Taisei Ichikawa (Japan) Kokoro Isomura
- Runners-up: (Philippines) Francis Alcantara (South Korea) Park Ui-sung
- Score: 7–5, 2–6, [10–5]

Events
Singles	men	women
Doubles	men	women
- President's Cup

Egor Agafonov and Ilia Simakin were the defending champions but chose not to defend their title.

Taisei Ichikawa and Kokoro Isomura won the title after defeating Francis Alcantara and Park Ui-sung 7–5, 2–6, [10–5] in the final.

== Seeds ==
1. (Philippines) Francis Alcantara / (South Korea) Park Ui-sung (final)
2. (Japan) Yusuke Kusuhara / (Japan) Shunsuke Nakagawa (semifinals)
3. (Japan) Taisei Ichikawa / (Japan) Kokoro Isomura (champions)
4. (Switzerland) Luca Castelnuovo / (France) Clément Chidekh (semifinals)

== Draw ==
Key

- Q = Qualifier
- WC = Wild card
- LL = Lucky loser
- Alt = Alternate
- ITF = ITF entry
- PR = Protected ranking
- SR = Special ranking
- SE = Special exempt
- JE = Junior exempt
- JR = Junior Accelerator Programme entrant
- CO = College Accelerator Programme entrant
- NG = Next Gen Accelerator Program entrant
- w/o = Walkover
- r = Retired
- d = Defaulted

=== Draw ===
First round
1	(Philippines) FC Alcantara (South Korea) U-s Park	6	6
WC	Ivan Denisov (Kazakhstan) A Omarkhanov	2	2
(South Korea) Shin Woo-bin (India) Parikshit Somani	6	6
(Georgia (country)) A Bakshi (Georgia (country)) Z Tkemaladze	4	4
4	(Switzerland) L Castelnuovo (France) C Chidekh	6	7
E Arutiunian; P Bar Biryukov	2	5
I Gakhov; D Golubev	5	4
(Italy) A Binda (Estonia) K Tamm	7	6
(Poland) Olaf Pieczkowski (India) K Singh	4	1
WC	(Slovakia) Michal Krajčí (Kazakhstan) Z Nurlanuly	6	6
Aleksandr Lobanov (South Korea) Shin San-hui	2	5
3	(Japan) T Ichikawa (Japan) K Isomura	6	7
(Kazakhstan) G Lomakin (Australia) E Winter	6	7^{7}
(Thailand) M Jones (Georgia (country)) S Purtseladze	3	6^{1}
(Australia) M Bouzige (India) Sai Karteek Reddy Ganta	2	4
2	(Japan) Y Kusuhara (Japan) S Nakagawa	6	6

Quarterfinals
1	(Philippines) FC Alcantara (South Korea) U-s Park	w/o
(South Korea) W-b Shin (India) P Somani
4	(Switzerland) L Castelnuovo (France) C Chidekh	6	6
(Italy) A Binda (Estonia) K Tamm	2	4
WC	(Slovakia) M Krajčí (Kazakhstan) Z Nurlanuly	2	3
3	(Japan) T Ichikawa (Japan) K Isomura	6	6
(Kazakhstan) G Lomakin (Australia) E Winter	4	6	[4]
2	(Japan) Y Kusuhara (Japan) S Nakagawa	6	4	[10]

Semifinals
1	(Philippines) FC Alcantara (South Korea) U-s Park	6	6
4	(Switzerland) L Castelnuovo (France) C Chidekh	3	3
3	(Japan) T Ichikawa (Japan) K Isomura	3	6	[10]
2	(Japan) Y Kusuhara (Japan) S Nakagawa	6	3	[5]

Final
1	(Philippines) FC Alcantara (South Korea) U-s Park	5	6	[5]
3	(Japan) T Ichikawa (Japan) K Isomura	7	2	[10]
