= 2015 President's Cup (tennis) =

- Date: 27 July –2 August
- Edition: 10th (men); 7th (women)
- Category: ATP Challenger Tour; ITF Women's Circuit
- Prize money: $75,000 (men) $25,000 (women)
- Surface: Hard
- Location: Astana, Kazakhstan

Champions

Men's singles
- (Kazakhstan) Mikhail Kukushkin

Women's singles
- (Russia) Natela Dzalamidze

Men's doubles
- (Russia) Konstantin Kravchuk / (Ukraine) Denys Molchanov

Women's doubles
- (Russia) Natela Dzalamidze / (Russia) Alena Tarasova
- President's Cup (tennis)

The 2015 President's Cup is a professional tennis tournament played on outdoor hard courts. It is the tenth edition of the men's tournament and the seventh edition for women, part of the 2015 ATP Challenger Tour and the 2015 ITF Women's Circuit respectively. Offering prize money of $75,000 for the men and $25,000 for the women, the events took place in Astana, Kazakhstan, on 27 July –2 August 2015.

== Men's singles main draw entrants ==
=== Seeds ===
Country	Player	Rank^{1}	Seed
KAZ	Mikhail Kukushkin	58	1
RUS	Konstantin Kravchuk	170	2
RUS	Evgeny Donskoy	176	3
RUS	Karen Khachanov	184	4
BEL	Yannick Mertens	195	5
JPN	Hiroki Moriya	210	6
USA	Connor Smith	218	7
TPE	Chen Ti	225	8

- ^{1} Rankings as of 20 July 2015

=== Other entrants ===
The following players received wildcards into the singles main draw:

- (South Korea) Chung Yun-seong
- (Uzbekistan) Jurabek Karimov
- (Kazakhstan) Timur Khabibulin
- (Kazakhstan) Roman Khassanov

The following player received entry with a protected ranking:

- (Israel) Amir Weintraub

The following players received entry from the qualifying draw:

- (Uzbekistan) Sanjar Fayziev
- (Belarus) Andrei Vasilevski
- (Russia) Markos Kalovelonis
- (Kazakhstan) Denis Yevseyev

== Women's singles main draw entrants ==
=== Seeds ===
Country	Player	Rank^{1}	Seed
RUS	Veronika Kudermetova	284	1
SLO	Tadeja Majerič	305	2
RUS	Ksenia Pervak	308	3
RUS	Natela Dzalamidze	333	4
AUS	Alexandra Nancarrow	412	5
BLR	Sviatlana Pirazhenka	416	6
KGZ	Ksenia Palkina	439	7
RUS	Ekaterina Yashina	484	8

- ^{1} Rankings as of 20 July 2015

=== Other entrants ===
The following players received wildcards into the singles main draw:

- (Russia) Polina Malykh
- (Kazakhstan) Arina Taluenko
- (Kazakhstan) Zhanelya Turarbek
- (Kazakhstan) Dina Zhamiyeva

The following players received entry from the qualifying draw:

- (Kazakhstan) Karina Kalkenova
- (Russia) Ekaterina Kunina
- (Russia) Ksenia Laskutova
- (Uzbekistan) Polina Merenkova
- (Belarus) Viktoryia Mun
- (Russia) Angelina Skidanova
- (Russia) Sofia Smagina
- (Russia) Adeliya Zabirova

The following player received entry by a lucky loser spot:

- (Uzbekistan) Aleksandra Stakhanova

== Champions ==
=== Men's singles ===
- (Kazakhstan) Mikhail Kukushkin def. (Russia) Evgeny Donskoy 6–2, 6–2

=== Women's singles ===
- (Russia) Natela Dzalamidze def. (Russia) Ksenia Pervak, 6–6, ret.

=== Men's doubles ===
- (Russia) Konstantin Kravchuk / (Ukraine) Denys Molchanov def. (South Korea) Chung Yun-seong / (Uzbekistan) Djurabeck Karimov 6–2, 6–2

=== Women's doubles ===
- (Russia) Natela Dzalamidze / (Russia) Alena Tarasova def. (Turkey) Başak Eraydın / (Kyrgyzstan) Ksenia Palkina, 6–0, 6–1
