= 2016 President's Cup (tennis) =

- Date: 25–31 July
- Edition: 11th (men); 8th (women)
- Category: ATP Challenger Tour; ITF Women's Circuit
- Prize money: $75,000 (men) $25,000 (women)
- Surface: Hard
- Location: Astana, Kazakhstan

Champions

Men's singles
- (Russia) Evgeny Donskoy

Women's singles
- (Ukraine) Alyona Sotnikova

Men's doubles
- (Belarus) Yaraslav Shyla / (Belarus) Andrei Vasilevski

Women's doubles
- (Russia) Natela Dzalamidze / (Russia) Veronika Kudermetova
- President's Cup (tennis)

The 2016 President's Cup (tennis) was a professional tennis tournament played on outdoor hard courts. It was the 11th edition for men and 8th edition for women. It was part of the 2016 ATP Challenger Tour and the 2016 ITF Women's Circuit, offering totals of $75,000 for men, and $25,000 for women in prize money. It took place in Astana, Kazakhstan, from the 25th through the 31st of July 2016.

== Men's singles main draw entrants ==
=== Seeds ===
Country	Player	Rank^{1}	Seed
RUS	Evgeny Donskoy	80	1
UZB	Denis Istomin	97	2
RUS	Teymuraz Gabashvili	101	3
RUS	Konstantin Kravchuk	105	4
RUS	Alexander Kudryavtsev	164	5
RUS	Daniil Medvedev	171	6
KOR	Lee Duck-hee	191	7
KAZ	Dmitry Popko	209	8

- ^{1} Rankings as of 18 July 2016.

=== Other entrants ===
The following players received a wildcard into the singles main draw:

- (Russia) Alexander Bublik
- (Kazakhstan) Alexey Kedryuk
- (Kazakhstan) Timur Khabibulin
- (Kazakhstan) Denis Yevseyev

The following players received entry from the qualifying draw:

- (Russia) Mikhail Elgin
- (Uzbekistan) Sanjar Fayziev
- (Chinese Taipei) Jason Jung
- (Russia) Anton Zaitcev

== Women's singles main draw entrants ==
=== Seeds ===
Country	Player	Rank^{1}	Seed
RUS	Natela Dzalamidze	268	1
RUS	Alena Tarasova	313	2
TUR	Pemra Özgen	322	3
RUS	Yana Sizikova	357	4
UKR	Anastasiya Vasylyeva	360	5
KAZ	Kamila Kerimbayeva	363	6
RUS	Olga Doroshina	398	7
RUS	Polina Monova	415	8

- ^{1} Rankings as of 18 July 2016.

=== Other entrants ===
The following players received a wildcard into the singles main draw:

- (Kazakhstan) Alexandra Grinchishina
- (Uzbekistan) Shakhnoza Khatamova
- (Kazakhstan) Arina Taluyenko
- (Ukraine) Katarina Zavatska

The following players received entry from the qualifying draw:

- (Russia) Lusine Avanesyan
- (Russia) Anastasia Frolova
- (Russia) Angelina Gabueva
- (Russia) Anzhelika Isaeva
- (Russia) Olga Puchkova
- (Russia) Valeria Savinykh
- (Kazakhstan) Anastassiya Sharapova
- (Russia) Alina Silich

== Champions ==
=== Men's singles ===
- (Russia) Evgeny Donskoy def. (Russia) Konstantin Kravchuk, 6–3, 6–3

=== Women's singles ===
- (Ukraine) Alyona Sotnikova def. (Russia) Veronika Kudermetova, 6–2, 6–3

=== Men's doubles ===
- (Belarus) Yaraslav Shyla / (Belarus) Andrei Vasilevski def. (Russia) Mikhail Elgin / (Russia) Alexander Kudryavtsev, 6–4, 6–4

=== Women's doubles ===
- (Russia) Natela Dzalamidze / (Russia) Veronika Kudermetova def. (Russia) Polina Monova / (Russia) Yana Sizikova, 6–2, 6–3
