= 2014 President's Cup – Women's doubles =

Women's doubles
- 2014 President's Cup (tennis)

Final
- Champions: (Russia) Vitalia Diatchenko (Russia) Margarita Gasparyan
- Runners-up: (Belgium) Michaela Boev (Germany) Anna-Lena Friedsam
- Score: 6–4, 6–1

Events
Singles	men	women
Doubles	men	women
- President's Cup (tennis)

Lyudmyla Kichenok and Nadiia Kichenok were the defending champions, but lost in the semifinals to fourth seeds Vitalia Diatchenko and Margarita Gasparyan.

Diatchenko and Gasparyan went on to win the tournament, defeating Michaela Boev and Anna-Lena Friedsam in the final, 6–4, 6–1.

== Seeds ==
1. (Ukraine) Lyudmyla Kichenok / (Ukraine) Nadiia Kichenok (semifinals)
2. (Turkey) Çağla Büyükakçay / (Turkey) Pemra Özgen (first round)
3. (Ukraine) Veronika Kapshay / (Uzbekistan) Albina Khabibulina (semifinals)
4. (Russia) Vitalia Diatchenko / (Russia) Margarita Gasparyan (champions)

== Draw ==
Key

- Q = Qualifier
- WC = Wild card
- LL = Lucky loser
- Alt = Alternate
- ITF = ITF entry
- PR = Protected ranking
- SR = Special ranking
- SE = Special exempt
- JE = Junior exempt
- JR = Junior Accelerator Programme entrant
- CO = College Accelerator Programme entrant
- NG = Next Gen Accelerator Program entrant
- w/o = Walkover
- r = Retired
- d = Defaulted

First round
1	(Ukraine) L Kichenok (Ukraine) N Kichenok	6	6
(Belarus) P Pekhova (Belarus) S Pirazhenka	4	2
(Russia) E Bychkova (Russia) V Kudermetova	6	4	[8]
(Russia) E Pashkova (Ukraine) G Poznikhirenko	3	6	[10]
4	(Russia) V Diatchenko (Russia) M Gasparyan	7^{7}	6
WC	(Kazakhstan) Y Putintseva (Russia) E Rodina	6^{4}	2
WC	(Uzbekistan) A Amanmuradova (Russia) Y Bryzgalova	7^{7}	6^{6}	[11]
(Belgium) Y Bonaventure (Turkey) M Sezer	6^{4}	7^{8}	[9]
(Turkey) İ Soylu (Croatia) A Vrljić	6	6
(Georgia (country)) E Gorgodze (Georgia (country)) S Kvatsabaia	2	2
Alt	(Russia) P Monova (Russia) E Yashina	2	3
3	(Ukraine) V Kapshay (Uzbekistan) A Khabibulina	6	6
(Ukraine) O Ianchuk (Ukraine) A Shkudun	6	6
WC	(Kazakhstan) A Grinchishina (Kazakhstan) E Klyueva	2	3
(Belgium) M Boev (Germany) A-L Friedsam	6	6
2	(Turkey) Ç Büyükakçay (Turkey) P Özgen	4	4

Quarterfinals
1	(Ukraine) L Kichenok (Ukraine) N Kichenok	6	6
(Russia) E Pashkova (Ukraine) G Poznikhirenko	2	4
4	(Russia) V Diatchenko (Russia) M Gasparyan	6	6
WC	(Uzbekistan) A Amanmuradova (Russia) Y Bryzgalova	4	2
(Turkey) İ Soylu (Croatia) A Vrljić	6	4	[7]
3	(Ukraine) V Kapshay (Uzbekistan) A Khabibulina	4	6	[10]
(Ukraine) O Ianchuk (Ukraine) A Shkudun	2	6	[6]
(Belgium) M Boev (Germany) A-L Friedsam	6	2	[10]

Semifinals
1	(Ukraine) L Kichenok (Ukraine) N Kichenok	4	5
4	(Russia) V Diatchenko (Russia) M Gasparyan	6	7
3	(Ukraine) V Kapshay (Uzbekistan) A Khabibulina	3	4
(Belgium) M Boev (Germany) A-L Friedsam	6	6

Final
4	(Russia) V Diatchenko (Russia) M Gasparyan	6	6
(Belgium) M Boev (Germany) A-L Friedsam	4	1
