= 2016 President's Cup – Men's singles =

Men's singles
- 2016 President's Cup (tennis)

Final
- Champion: (Russia) Evgeny Donskoy
- Runner-up: (Russia) Konstantin Kravchuk
- Score: 6–3, 6–3

Events
Singles	men	women
Doubles	men	women
- President's Cup (tennis)

Mikhail Kukushkin was the defending champion, but chose not to defend his title.

Evgeny Donskoy won the title defeating fellow Russian Konstantin Kravchuk in the final, 6–3, 6–3.

== Seeds ==
1. (Russia) Evgeny Donskoy (champion)
2. (Uzbekistan) Denis Istomin (semifinals)
3. (Russia) Teymuraz Gabashvili (second round)
4. (Russia) Konstantin Kravchuk (final)
5. (Russia) Alexander Kudryavtsev (second round)
6. (Russia) Daniil Medvedev (quarterfinals)
7. (South Korea) Lee Duck-hee (quarterfinals)
8. (Kazakhstan) Dmitry Popko (first round)

== Draw ==
Key

- Q = Qualifier
- WC = Wild card
- LL = Lucky loser
- Alt = Alternate
- ITF = ITF entry
- PR = Protected ranking
- SR = Special ranking
- SE = Special exempt
- JE = Junior exempt
- JR = Junior Accelerator Programme entrant
- CO = College Accelerator Programme entrant
- NG = Next Gen Accelerator Program entrant
- w/o = Walkover
- r = Retired
- d = Defaulted

=== Finals ===
Semifinals
1	(Russia) Evgeny Donskoy	6	6
(Belarus) Ilya Ivashka	4	4
4	(Russia) Konstantin Kravchuk	6	4	6
2	(Uzbekistan) Denis Istomin	3	6	3

Final
1	(Russia) Evgeny Donskoy	6	6
4	(Russia) Konstantin Kravchuk	3	3

=== Top half ===
First round
1	(Russia) E Donskoy	4	6	4
Q	(Russia) M Elgin	6	1	1^{r}
(Ukraine) D Molchanov	3	4
(Italy) Edoardo Eremin	6	6
(Japan) Shuichi Sekiguchi	1	2
(Serbia) M Janković	6	6
Q	(Russia) A Zaitcev	4	6	6
8	(Kazakhstan) D Popko	6	2	1
3	(Russia) T Gabashvili	6	6
(Spain) D Pérez Sanz	2	1
(Colombia) N Barrientos	6^{3}	4
WC	(Russia) A Bublik	7^{7}	6
(Belarus) M Dubarenco	3	6^{0}
(Belarus) I Ivashka	6	7^{7}
WC	(Kazakhstan) T Khabibulin	0	4
5	(Russia) A Kudryavtsev	6	6

Second round
1	(Russia) E Donskoy	6	6
(Italy) E Eremin	3	2
(Serbia) M Janković	7^{7}	7^{9}
Q	(Russia) A Zaitcev	6^{4}	6^{7}
3	(Russia) T Gabashvili	6	5	4
WC	(Russia) A Bublik	4	7	6
(Belarus) I Ivashka	4	6	6
5	(Russia) A Kudryavtsev	6	2	0

Quarterfinals
1	(Russia) E Donskoy	7	0
(Serbia) M Janković	5	0^{r}
WC	(Russia) A Bublik	4	6	5
(Belarus) I Ivashka	6	4	7

Semifinals
1	(Russia) E Donskoy	6	6
(Belarus) I Ivashka	4	4

=== Bottom half ===
First round
7	(South Korea) D-h Lee	7	6
(Poland) M Przysiężny	5	0
WC	(Kazakhstan) A Kedryuk	1	0
(Croatia) A Pavić	6	6
(Slovenia) B Kavčič	6	6
(Belarus) D Zhyrmont	2	2
(Italy) A Bega	2	2
4	(Russia) K Kravchuk	6	6
6	(Russia) D Medvedev	7^{7}	4	6
Q	(Chinese Taipei) J Jung	6^{5}	6	3
Q	(Uzbekistan) S Fayziev	6	1	3
(China) Z Li	1	6	6
WC	(Kazakhstan) D Yevseyev	0	4
(Japan) Yuya Kibi	6	6
(Chinese Taipei) T Chen	3	2
2	(Uzbekistan) D Istomin	6	6

Second round
7	(South Korea) D-h Lee	6	6
(Croatia) A Pavić	1	2
(Slovenia) B Kavčič	4	7	3
4	(Russia) K Kravchuk	6	5	6
6	(Russia) D Medvedev	7^{7}	6
(China) Z Li	6^{1}	2
(Japan) Y Kibi	6^{3}	6	2
2	(Uzbekistan) D Istomin	7^{7}	2	6

Quarterfinals
7	(South Korea) D-h Lee	4	6^{5}
4	(Russia) K Kravchuk	6	7^{7}
6	(Russia) D Medvedev	6^{5}	6^{5}
2	(Uzbekistan) D Istomin	7^{7}	7^{7}

Semifinals
4	(Russia) K Kravchuk	6	4	6
2	(Uzbekistan) D Istomin	3	6	3
