= 2013 President's Cup – Women's singles =

Women's singles
- 2013 President's Cup (tennis)

Final
- Champion: (Ukraine) Nadiya Kichenok
- Runner-up: (Portugal) Maria João Koehler
- Score: 6–4, 7–5

Events
Singles	men	women
Doubles	men	women
- President's Cup (tennis)

Maria João Koehler failed to defend her title from 2012, losing to Ukrainian Nadiya Kichenok in the final, 6–4, 7–5.

== Seeds ==
1. (Portugal) Maria João Koehler (final)
2. (Thailand) Luksika Kumkhum (semifinals)
3. (Russia) Nina Bratchikova (quarterfinals)
4. (Russia) Alexandra Panova (quarterfinals)
5. (Turkey) Çağla Büyükakçay (quarterfinals)
6. (Kazakhstan) Ksenia Pervak (second round)
7. (Thailand) Tamarine Tanasugarn (first round)
8. (Russia) Ekaterina Bychkova (quarterfinals)

== Main draw ==
Key

- Q = Qualifier
- WC = Wild card
- LL = Lucky loser
- Alt = Alternate
- ITF = ITF entry
- PR = Protected ranking
- SR = Special ranking
- SE = Special exempt
- JE = Junior exempt
- JR = Junior Accelerator Programme entrant
- CO = College Accelerator Programme entrant
- NG = Next Gen Accelerator Program entrant
- w/o = Walkover
- r = Retired
- d = Defaulted

=== Finals ===
Semifinals
1	(Portugal) Maria João Koehler	6	6
(France) Alizé Lim	2	2
(Ukraine) Nadiya Kichenok	7^{11}	7
2	(Thailand) Luksika Kumkhum	6^{9}	5

Final
1	(Portugal) Maria João Koehler	4	5
(Ukraine) Nadiya Kichenok	6	7

=== Top half ===
First round
1	(Portugal) MJ Koehler	6	6
(Thailand) N Luangnam	1	2
Q	(Russia) Y Buchina	7^{7}	6
Q	(Russia) V Flink	6^{5}	2
(Kyrgyzstan) K Palkina	7	3	6
(United Kingdom) L Whybourn	5	6	1
(Georgia (country)) S Shapatava	4	6^{3}
5	(Turkey) Ç Büyükakçay	6	7^{7}
3	(Russia) N Bratchikova	6	2	6
(Russia) V Solovyeva	0	6	3
(Ukraine) L Kichenok	4	6	6
(Thailand) V Wongteanchai	6	2	2
(Slovakia) M Hončová	3	1
(France) A Lim	6	6
WC	(Kazakhstan) K Kerimbayeva	2	0
6/WC	(Kazakhstan) K Pervak	6	6

Second round
1	(Portugal) MJ Koehler	6	6
Q	(Russia) Y Buchina	1	0
(Kyrgyzstan) K Palkina	4	2
5	(Turkey) Ç Büyükakçay	6	6
3	(Russia) N Bratchikova	6	6
(Ukraine) L Kichenok	3	4
(France) A Lim	7^{7}	6
6/WC	(Kazakhstan) K Pervak	6^{1}	4

Quarterfinals
1	(Portugal) MJ Koehler	4	7	6
5	(Turkey) Ç Büyükakçay	6	5	0
3	(Russia) N Bratchikova	6^{4}	0
(France) A Lim	7^{7}	6

Semifinals
1	(Portugal) MJ Koehler	6	6
(France) A Lim	2	2

=== Bottom half ===
First round
7	(Thailand) T Tanasugarn	3	3
(Ukraine) Y Beygelzimer	6	6
(Ukraine) N Kichenok	6	6
WC	(Kazakhstan) A Yepisheva	0	1
(Russia) M Gasparyan	6	6
(Poland) P Kania	3	1
WC	(Kazakhstan) A Dair	1	1
4	(Russia) A Panova	6	6
8	(Russia) E Bychkova	6	6
Q	(Russia) K Kirillova	1	3
(Kazakhstan) Z Diyas	2	6	6
(Kazakhstan) A Danilina	6	3	2
(China) Z Yang	3	2
(Thailand) N Lertcheewakarn	6	6
Q	(Russia) E Pashkova	4	1
2	(Thailand) L Kumkhum	6	6

Second round
(Ukraine) Y Beygelzimer	3	6^{5}
(Ukraine) N Kichenok	6	7^{7}
(Russia) M Gasparyan	7^{7}	4	2
4	(Russia) A Panova	6^{3}	6	6
8	(Russia) E Bychkova	6	3	7^{7}
(Kazakhstan) Z Diyas	2	6	6^{5}
(Thailand) N Lertcheewakarn	0	1
2	(Thailand) L Kumkhum	6	6

Quarterfinals
(Ukraine) N Kichenok	6	6
4	(Russia) A Panova	0	3
8	(Russia) E Bychkova	2	1
2	(Thailand) L Kumkhum	6	6

Semifinals
(Ukraine) N Kichenok	7^{11}	7
2	(Thailand) L Kumkhum	6^{9}	5
