= 2014 President's Cup – Women's singles =

Women's singles
- 2014 President's Cup (tennis)

Final
- Champion: (Russia) Vitalia Diatchenko
- Runner-up: (Turkey) Çağla Büyükakçay
- Score: 6–4, 3–6, 6–2

Events
Singles	men	women
Doubles	men	women
- President's Cup (tennis)

Nadiia Kichenok was the defending champion, but lost in the first round to Akgul Amanmuradova.

Vitalia Diatchenko won the title, defeating the third seed Çağla Büyükakçay in the final, 6–4, 3–6, 6–2.

== Seeds ==
1. (Germany) Anna-Lena Friedsam (semifinals)
2. (Ukraine) Nadiia Kichenok (first round)
3. (Turkey) Çağla Büyükakçay (final)
4. (Russia) Marta Sirotkina (first round)
5. (Russia) Ekaterina Bychkova (second round; retired)
6. (Ukraine) Lyudmyla Kichenok (second round)
7. (Russia) Polina Vinogradova (quarterfinals)
8. (Kazakhstan) Yulia Putintseva (first round)

== Main draw ==
Key

- Q = Qualifier
- WC = Wild card
- LL = Lucky loser
- Alt = Alternate
- ITF = ITF entry
- PR = Protected ranking
- SR = Special ranking
- SE = Special exempt
- JE = Junior exempt
- JR = Junior Accelerator Programme entrant
- CO = College Accelerator Programme entrant
- NG = Next Gen Accelerator Program entrant
- w/o = Walkover
- r = Retired
- d = Defaulted

=== Finals ===
Semifinals
1	(Germany) Anna-Lena Friedsam	6	3	6^{7}
3	(Turkey) Çağla Büyükakçay	3	6	7^{9}
(Russia) Vitalia Diatchenko	6	7
PR	(Uzbekistan) Akgul Amanmuradova	3	5

Final
3	(Turkey) Çağla Büyükakçay	4	6	2
(Russia) Vitalia Diatchenko	6	3	6

=== Top half ===
First round
1	(Germany) A-L Friedsam	6	7^{7}
(Turkey) P Özgen	3	6^{2}
Q	(Belarus) S Pirazhenka	6	6
WC	(Russia) A Bukhanko	1	0
(Italy) G Sanesi	3	4
(Ukraine) V Kapshay	6	6
(Russia) M Gasparyan	6	6
8	(Kazakhstan) Y Putintseva	3	2
3	(Turkey) Ç Büyükakçay	6	6
WC	(Kazakhstan) A Grinchishina	1	0
Q	(Ukraine) O Ianchuk	7^{8}	3	6
(Belgium) Y Bonaventure	6^{8}	6	2
(Croatia) A Vrljić	6	2	6
(Germany) N Zander	4	6	3
(Kazakhstan) K Kerimbayeva	0	0^{r}
7	(Russia) P Vinogradova	6	1

Second round
1	(Germany) A-L Friedsam	6	4	7^{7}
Q	(Belarus) S Pirazhenka	1	6	6^{4}
(Ukraine) V Kapshay	2	5
(Russia) M Gasparyan	6	7
3	(Turkey) Ç Büyükakçay	6	6
Q	(Ukraine) O Ianchuk	3	4
(Croatia) A Vrljić	6^{4}	5
7	(Russia) P Vinogradova	7^{7}	7

Quarterfinals
1	(Germany) A-L Friedsam	7	7
(Russia) M Gasparyan	5	5
3	(Turkey) Ç Büyükakçay	2	6	6
7	(Russia) P Vinogradova	6	2	1

Semifinals
1	(Germany) A-L Friedsam	6	3	6^{7}
3	(Turkey) Ç Büyükakçay	3	6	7^{9}

=== Bottom half ===
First round
6	(Ukraine) L Kichenok	7^{7}	6
PR	(Russia) E Rodina	6^{4}	0
(Russia) O Puchkova	6	6^{1}	4
(Russia) V Diatchenko	2	7^{7}	6
(Georgia (country)) E Gorgodze	6	6^{6}	5
WC	(Kazakhstan) E Klyueva	3	7^{8}	7
Q	(Russia) V Kudermetova	6	2	6
4	(Russia) M Sirotkina	2	6	2
5	(Russia) E Bychkova	6	6
(Russia) M Katsitadze	2	4
PR	(Croatia) A Savić	6	0	6
WC	(Kazakhstan) A Danilina	4	6	4
(Ukraine) G Poznikhirenko	6	1	2
Q	(Turkey) İ Soylu	2	6	6
PR	(Uzbekistan) A Amanmuradova	6	6
2	(Ukraine) N Kichenok	2	4

Second round
6	(Ukraine) L Kichenok	2	2
(Russia) V Diatchenko	6	6
WC	(Kazakhstan) E Klyueva	1	0
Q	(Russia) V Kudermetova	6	6
5	(Russia) E Bychkova	1	1^{r}
PR	(Croatia) A Savić	6	2
Q	(Turkey) İ Soylu	4	1
PR	(Uzbekistan) A Amanmuradova	6	6

Quarterfinals
(Russia) V Diatchenko	6	7
Q	(Russia) V Kudermetova	4	5
PR	(Croatia) A Savić	2	2
PR	(Uzbekistan) A Amanmuradova	6	6

Semifinals
(Russia) V Diatchenko	6	7
PR	(Uzbekistan) A Amanmuradova	3	5
