= 2025 President's Cup – Men's singles =

Men's singles
- 2025 President's Cup

Final
- Champion: (Norway) Nicolai Budkov Kjær
- Runner-up: (Italy) Alexandr Binda
- Score: 6–4, 6–3

Events
Singles	men	women
Doubles	men	women
- President's Cup

Dimitar Kuzmanov was the defending champion but chose not to defend his title.

Nicolai Budkov Kjær won the title after defeating Alexandr Binda 6–4, 6–3 in the final.

== Seeds ==
1. (France) Clément Chidekh (quarterfinals)
2. (Norway) Nicolai Budkov Kjær (champion)
3. Ivan Gakhov (second round)
4. (Georgia (country)) Saba Purtseladze (first round)
5. (Australia) Moerani Bouzige (first round)
6. Petr Bar Biryukov (first round, retired)
7. (Jordan) Abdullah Shelbayh (semifinals)
8. (Lithuania) Ričardas Berankis (quarterfinals)

== Draw ==
Key

- Q = Qualifier
- WC = Wild card
- LL = Lucky loser
- Alt = Alternate
- ITF = ITF entry
- PR = Protected ranking
- SR = Special ranking
- SE = Special exempt
- JE = Junior exempt
- JR = Junior Accelerator Programme entrant
- CO = College Accelerator Programme entrant
- NG = Next Gen Accelerator Program entrant
- w/o = Walkover
- r = Retired
- d = Defaulted

=== Finals ===
Semifinals
7	(Jordan) Abdullah Shelbayh	6^{6}	6	5
(Italy) Alexandr Binda	7^{8}	4	7
(Japan) Shintaro Imai	3	5
2	(Norway) Nicolai Budkov Kjær	6	7

Final
(Italy) Alexandr Binda	4	3
2	(Norway) Nicolai Budkov Kjær	6	6

=== Top half ===
First round
1	(France) C Chidekh	6	6
(South Korea) Shin San-hui	3	4
(Malaysia) Mitsuki Wei Kang Leong	7	6
WC	(Uzbekistan) Maxim Shin	5	2
Q	(Turkey) A Azkara	3	5
(South Korea) Shin Woo-bin	6	7
Q	Maxim Zhukov	3	4
7	(Jordan) A Shelbayh	6	6
3	I Gakhov	6	6^{4}	7
E Arutiunian	1	7^{7}	5
E Gerasimov	5	1
(India) K Singh	7	6
Q	(Czech Republic) D Palán	6^{2}	5
(Poland) Olaf Pieczkowski	7^{7}	7
(Italy) A Binda	6	2
6	P Bar Biryukov	3	1^{r}

Second round
1	(France) C Chidekh	7^{7}	6
(Malaysia) MWK Leong	6^{1}	4
(South Korea) W-b Shin	6	3	0^{r}
7	(Jordan) A Shelbayh	4	6	0
3	I Gakhov	3	6^{7}
(India) K Singh	6	7^{9}
(Poland) O Pieczkowski	2	7	4
(Italy) A Binda	6	5	6

Quarterfinals
1	(France) C Chidekh	6	3	4
7	(Jordan) A Shelbayh	3	6	6
(India) K Singh	4	4
(Italy) A Binda	6	6

Semifinals
7	(Jordan) A Shelbayh	6^{6}	6	5
(Italy) A Binda	7^{8}	4	7

=== Bottom half ===
First round
5	(Australia) M Bouzige	1	3
Q	(Australia) E Winter	6	6
(Japan) Shintaro Imai	6	7^{7}
WC	(Kazakhstan) A Omarkhanov	2	6^{4}
(Georgia (country)) A Bakshi	6	6^{2}	6
(Japan) K Isomura	1	7^{7}	3
Q	(India) M Sasikumar	6	6
4	(Georgia (country)) S Purtseladze	4	4
8	(Lithuania) R Berankis	6	6
WC	(Kazakhstan) Z Nurlanuly	2	2
(Switzerland) L Castelnuovo	7^{7}	6
Q	(South Korea) U-s Park	6^{3}	3
(Thailand) M Jones	6	6
(Japan) Renta Tokuda	3	3
(Japan) Takuya Kumasaka	3	4
2	(Norway) N Budkov Kjær	6	6

Second round
Q	(Australia) E Winter	6^{4}	3
(Japan) S Imai	7^{7}	6
(Georgia (country)) A Bakshi	7^{7}	3	6
Q	(India) M Sasikumar	6^{4}	6	4
8	(Lithuania) R Berankis	7^{7}	4	6
(Switzerland) L Castelnuovo	6^{2}	6	4
(Thailand) M Jones	3	0
2	(Norway) N Budkov Kjær	6	6

Quarterfinals
(Japan) S Imai	2	6	6
(Georgia (country)) A Bakshi	6	4	4
8	(Lithuania) R Berankis	6^{4}	4
2	(Norway) N Budkov Kjær	7^{7}	6

Semifinals
(Japan) S Imai	3	5
2	(Norway) N Budkov Kjær	6	7
