= List of Kazakhstan Davis Cup team representatives =

This is a list of tennis players who have represented the Kazakhstan Davis Cup team in an official Davis Cup match. Kazakhstan have taken part in the competition since 1995.

== Players ==
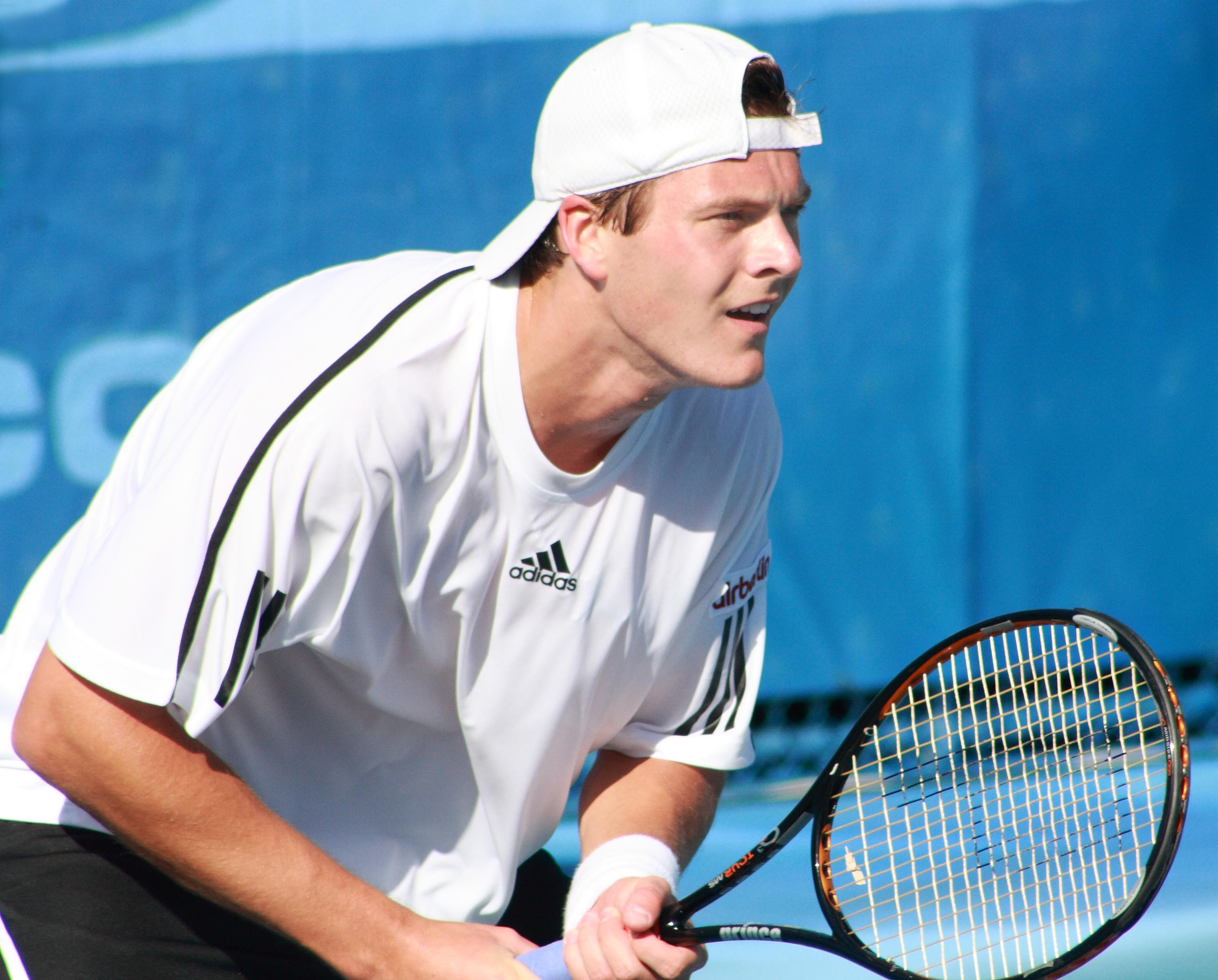
Evgeny Korolev

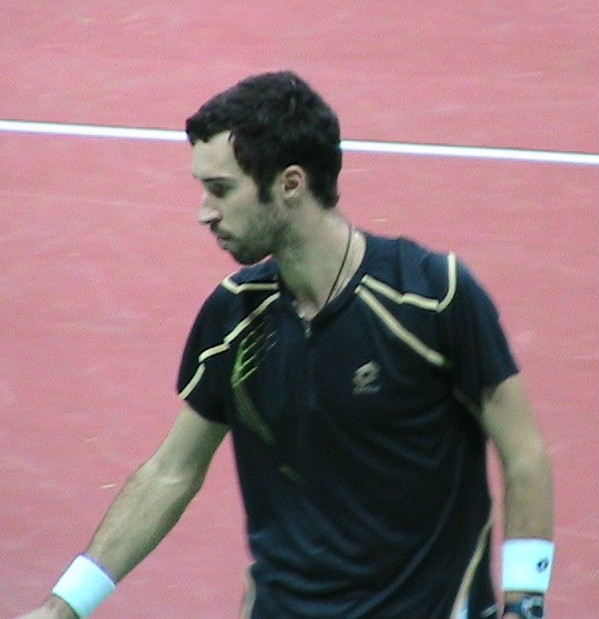
Mikhail Kukushkin

| Player | W-L (Total) | W-L (Singles) | W-L (Doubles) | Ties | Debut |
|---|---|---|---|---|---|
| Syrym Abdukhalikov | 3–5 | 3–3 | 0–2 | 4 | 2007 |
| Dmitri Arissov | 7–9 | 5–3 | 2–6 | 11 | 1995 |
| Pavel Baranov | 16–8 | 11–5 | 5–3 | 14 | 1998 |
| Stanislav Bykov | 0–2 | 0–2 | 0–0 | 2 | 2005 |
| Igor Chaldounov | 11–12 | 2–8 | 9–4 | 20 | 1995 |
| Dias Doskaraev | 10–7 | 6–5 | 4–2 | 15 | 1999 |
| Andrey Golubev | 14–5 | 11–4 | 3–1 | 9 | 2008 |
| Yuriy Karlov | 1–0 | 0–0 | 1–0 | 1 | 1997 |
| Alexey Kedryuk | 66–34 | 43–17 | 23–17 | 51 | 1995 |
| Evgeny Korolev | 0–5 | 0–2 | 0–3 | 3 | 2011 |
| Mikhail Kukushkin | 10–5 | 10–5 | 0–0 | 9 | 2008 |
| Dmitriy Makeyev | 4–13 | 2–9 | 2–4 | 9 | 2002 |
| Maxim Novikov | 0–4 | 0–3 | 0–1 | 4 | 1995 |
| Vitaliy Pavlov | 0–1 | 0–1 | 0–0 | 1 | 2006 |
| Yuri Schukin | 7–7 | 2–2 | 5–5 | 10 | 2008 |
| Anton Tsymbalov | 10–4 | 4–2 | 6–2 | 10 | 2002 |
