= 2015 President's Cup – Men's singles =

Men's singles
- 2015 President's Cup (tennis)

Final
- Champion: (Kazakhstan) Mikhail Kukushkin
- Runner-up: (Russia) Evgeny Donskoy
- Score: 6–2, 6–2

Events
Singles	men	women
Doubles	men	women
- President's Cup (tennis)

Ričardas Berankis was the defending champion but chose to play in the Atlanta Open instead.

Mikhail Kukushkin won the tournament, defeating Evgeny Donskoy in the final.

== Seeds ==
1. (Kazakhstan) Mikhail Kukushkin (champion)
2. (Russia) Konstantin Kravchuk (semifinals)
3. (Russia) Evgeny Donskoy (final)
4. (Russia) Karen Khachanov (second round)
5. (Belgium) Yannick Mertens (quarterfinals)
6. (Japan) Hiroki Moriya (second round)
7. (United States) Connor Smith (first round)
8. (Chinese Taipei) Chen Ti (quarterfinals)

== Draw ==
Key

- Q = Qualifier
- WC = Wild card
- LL = Lucky loser
- Alt = Alternate
- ITF = ITF entry
- PR = Protected ranking
- SR = Special ranking
- SE = Special exempt
- JE = Junior exempt
- JR = Junior Accelerator Programme entrant
- CO = College Accelerator Programme entrant
- NG = Next Gen Accelerator Program entrant
- w/o = Walkover
- r = Retired
- d = Defaulted

=== Finals ===
Semifinals
1	(Kazakhstan) Mikhail Kukushkin	6	6
(Kazakhstan) Dmitry Popko	2	4
3	(Russia) Evgeny Donskoy	7^{8}	7^{7}
2	(Russia) Konstantin Kravchuk	6^{6}	6^{2}

Final
1	(Kazakhstan) Mikhail Kukushkin	6	6
3	(Russia) Evgeny Donskoy	2	2

=== Top half ===
First round
1	(Kazakhstan) M Kukushkin	7	6
WC	(South Korea) Y-s Chung	5	4
Q	(Russia) M Kalovelonis	3	6	6
(United Kingdom) J Milton	6	3	2
(Spain) E López-Pérez	4	4
(Ukraine) D Molchanov	6	6
WC	(Kazakhstan) R Khassanov	0	2
6	(Japan) H Moriya	6	6
4	(Russia) K Khachanov	7^{7}	6
PR	(Israel) A Weintraub	6^{3}	0
(France) Sébastien Boltz	4	4
(Kazakhstan) D Popko	6	6
(France) A Musialek	6	6^{4}	3
Q	(Uzbekistan) S Fayziev	0	7^{7}	6
(Bulgaria) D Kuzmanov	2	3
8	(Chinese Taipei) T Chen	6	6

Second round
1	(Kazakhstan) M Kukushkin	6	6
Q	(Russia) M Kalovelonis	0	1
(Ukraine) D Molchanov	6	6
6	(Japan) H Moriya	1	1
4	(Russia) K Khachanov	7	3	1
(Kazakhstan) D Popko	5	6	6
Q	(Uzbekistan) S Fayziev	1	6^{5}
8	(Chinese Taipei) T Chen	6	7^{7}

Quarterfinals
1	(Kazakhstan) M Kukushkin	6	2	6
(Ukraine) D Molchanov	1	6	2
(Kazakhstan) D Popko	6	6
8	(Chinese Taipei) T Chen	3	2

Semifinals
1	(Kazakhstan) M Kukushkin	6	6
(Kazakhstan) D Popko	2	4

=== Bottom half ===
First round
7	(United States) Connor Smith	6^{6}	4
(Belarus) M Dubarenco	7^{8}	6
Q	(Kazakhstan) D Yevseyev	6	5	3
(Uzbekistan) T Ismailov	3	7	6
(Belarus) I Ivashka	5	6	2
(Croatia) F Škugor	7	2	6
(Belarus) Y Shyla	3	3
3	(Russia) E Donskoy	6	6
5	(Belgium) Y Mertens	6	7^{9}
(Spain) D Pérez Sanz	3	6^{7}
WC	(Uzbekistan) J Karimov	2	4
WC	(Kazakhstan) T Khabibulin	6	6
Q	(Belarus) A Vasilevski	3	5
(South Korea) D-h Lee	6	7
(Belarus) D Zhyrmont	2	0^{r}
2	(Russia) K Kravchuk	6	3

Second round
(Belarus) M Dubarenco	6	6
(Uzbekistan) T Ismailov	4	0
(Croatia) F Škugor	5	6	4
3	(Russia) E Donskoy	7	0	6
5	(Belgium) Y Mertens	6	6
WC	(Kazakhstan) T Khabibulin	2	3
(South Korea) D-h Lee	7^{8}	3	2
2	(Russia) K Kravchuk	6^{6}	6	6

Quarterfinals
(Belarus) M Dubarenco	4	4
3	(Russia) E Donskoy	6	6
5	(Belgium) Y Mertens	1	7^{9}	4
2	(Russia) K Kravchuk	6	6^{7}	6

Semifinals
3	(Russia) E Donskoy	7^{8}	7^{6}
2	(Russia) K Kravchuk	6^{6}	6^{2}
