= 2014 Astana Challenger =

Tennis tournament held in Kazakhstan

- Date: 17–23 February
- Edition: 8th
- Draw: 32S / 16D
- Prize money: $75,000
- Surface: Hard (indoor)
- Location: Astana, Kazakhstan

Champions

Singles
- (Kazakhstan) Andrey Golubev

Doubles
- (Belarus) Sergey Betov / (Belarus) Alexander Bury
- Astana Challenger

The 2014 Astana Challenger was a professional tennis tournament played on indoor hard courts. It was the 8th edition and part of the 2014 ATP Challenger Tour, offering a total of $75,000 in prize money on 17–23 February 2014.

== Men's main draw entrants ==
=== Seeds ===
Country	Player	Rank^{1}	Seed
KAZ	Andrey Golubev	83	1
ITA	Matteo Viola	172	2
RUS	Konstantin Kravchuk	175	3
TUR	Marsel İlhan	184	4
ITA	Flavio Cipolla	192	5
CZE	Jan Mertl	200	6
RUS	Alexander Kudryavtsev	201	7
CZE	Jaroslav Pospíšil	217	8

=== Other entrants ===
The following players received wildcards into the singles main draw:

- (Kazakhstan) Kuatbek Abiyev
- (Kazakhstan) Timur Khabibulin
- (Russia) Karen Khachanov
- (Kazakhstan) Denis Yevseyev

The following players used protected ranking to gain entry into the singles main draw :

- (Luxembourg) Gilles Müller

The following players received entry from the qualifying draw:

- (Georgia (country)) Aleksandre Metreveli
- (Georgia (country)) Nikoloz Basilashvili
- (Russia) Victor Baluda
- (Russia) Alexey Vatutin

== Champions ==
=== Singles ===
- (Kazakhstan) Andrey Golubev def. (Luxembourg) Gilles Müller 6–4, 6–4

=== Doubles ===
- (Belarus) Sergey Betov / (Belarus) Alexander Bury def. (Kazakhstan) Andrey Golubev / (Kazakhstan) Evgeny Korolev 6–1, 6–4
