= 2013 President's Cup – Men's singles =

Men's singles
- 2013 President's Cup (tennis)

Final
- Champion: (Israel) Dudi Sela
- Runner-up: (Kazakhstan) Mikhail Kukushkin
- Score: 5–7, 6–2, 7–6^{(8–6)}

Events
Singles	men	women
Doubles	men	women
- President's Cup (tennis)

Evgeny Donskoy was the defending champion, but chose not to compete.
Number 1 seed Dudi Sela overcame Mikhail Kukushkin 5–7, 6–2, 7–6^{(8–6)}.

== Seeds ==
1. (Israel) Dudi Sela (champion)
2. (Russia) Teymuraz Gabashvili (quarterfinals)
3. (Kazakhstan) Andrey Golubev (semifinals)
4. (Russia) Konstantin Kravchuk (semifinals)
5. (Turkey) Marsel İlhan (quarterfinals)
6. (Kazakhstan) Mikhail Kukushkin (final)
7. (Ukraine) Ivan Sergeyev (quarterfinals)
8. (Belarus) Dzmitry Zhyrmont (quarterfinals)

== Main draw ==
Key

- Q = Qualifier
- WC = Wild card
- LL = Lucky loser
- Alt = Alternate
- ITF = ITF entry
- PR = Protected ranking
- SR = Special ranking
- SE = Special exempt
- JE = Junior exempt
- JR = Junior Accelerator Programme entrant
- CO = College Accelerator Programme entrant
- NG = Next Gen Accelerator Program entrant
- w/o = Walkover
- r = Retired
- d = Defaulted

=== Finals ===
Semifinals
1	(Israel) Dudi Sela	7^{7}	6
4	(Russia) Konstantin Kravchuk	6^{2}	1
3	(Kazakhstan) Andrey Golubev	7	2	6^{5}
6	(Kazakhstan) Mikhail Kukushkin	5	6	7^{7}

Final
1	(Israel) Dudi Sela	5	6	7^{8}
6	(Kazakhstan) Mikhail Kukushkin	7	2	6^{6}

=== Top half ===
First round
1	(Israel) D Sela	6	6
(Kazakhstan) D Yevseyev	1	2
(United Kingdom) B Klein	6
(Thailand) D Udomchoke	5^{r}
(Spain) E López-Pérez	7^{7}	0	5
LL	(Russia) M Biryukov	6^{3}	6	7
(Australia) J Statham	4	6	4
7	(Ukraine) I Sergeyev	6	4	6
4	(Russia) K Kravchuk	6	6
(Italy) C Grassi	2	2
(India) J Nedunchezhiyan	5	6	6^{3}
(Georgia (country)) N Basilashvili	7	2	7^{7}
(South Korea) Y-k Lim	6^{5}	4
Q	(Russia) A Kudryavtsev	7^{7}	6
Q	(Russia) M Ledovskikh	1	7	0^{r}
8	(Belarus) D Zhyrmont	6	5	2

Second round
1	(Israel) D Sela	6	6
(United Kingdom) B Klein	4	1
LL	(Russia) M Biryukov	4	4
7	(Ukraine) I Sergeyev	6	6
4	(Russia) K Kravchuk	6	6
(Georgia (country)) N Basilashvili	0	4
Q	(Russia) A Kudryavtsev	0^{r}
8	(Belarus) D Zhyrmont	3

Quarterfinals
1	(Israel) D Sela	6	6
7	(Ukraine) I Sergeyev	1	1
4	(Russia) K Kravchuk	3	6	7^{7}
8	(Belarus) D Zhyrmont	6	2	6^{3}

Semifinals
1	(Israel) D Sela
4	(Russia) K Kravchuk

=== Bottom half ===
First round
5	(Turkey) M İlhan	7^{9}	6^{4}	6
(India) S Balaji	6^{7}	7^{7}	0
WC	(Kazakhstan) T Khabibulin	2	0
(Russia) V Baluda	6	6
WC	(Kazakhstan) D Popko	2	0
(Russia) Alexander Lobkov	6	6
(Italy) R Ghedin	3	3
3	(Kazakhstan) A Golubev	6	6
6	(Kazakhstan) M Kukushkin	7	7^{7}
(Slovakia) Adrian Sikora	5	6^{2}
WC	(Kazakhstan) Alexey Nesterov	3	1
(Australia) D Propoggia	6	6
Q	(Belarus) E Gerasimov	6^{3}	7^{7}	6
Q	(Russia) A Karatsev	7^{7}	6^{3}	3
(Chinese Taipei) T Chen	5	6	3
2	(Russia) T Gabashvili	7	3	6

Second round
5	(Turkey) M İlhan	6	6
(Russia) V Baluda	3	0
(Russia) A Lobkov	5	2
3	(Kazakhstan) A Golubev	7	6
6	(Kazakhstan) M Kukushkin	6	6
(Australia) D Propoggia	4	1
Q	(Belarus) E Gerasimov	5	3
2	(Russia) T Gabashvili	7	6

Quarterfinals
5	(Turkey) M İlhan	6^{10}	4
3	(Kazakhstan) A Golubev	7^{12}	6
6	(Kazakhstan) M Kukushkin	6	6
2	(Russia) T Gabashvili	4	3

Semifinals
3	(Kazakhstan) A Golubev
6	(Kazakhstan) M Kukushkin
