= 2014 President's Cup – Men's doubles =

Men's doubles
- 2014 President's Cup (tennis)

Final
- Champions: (Ukraine) Sergei Bubka (Switzerland) Marco Chiudinelli
- Runners-up: (Chinese Taipei) Chen Ti (Chinese Taipei) Huang Liang-chi
- Score: 6–3, 6–4

Events
Singles	men	women
Doubles	men	women
- President's Cup (tennis)

Riccardo Ghedin and Claudio Grassi are the holders, but chose not to compete.

Sergei Bubka and Marco Chiudinelli won the tournament, beating Chen Ti and Huang Liang-chi 6–3, 6–4

== Seeds ==
1. (Belarus) Sergey Betov / (Belarus) Alexander Bury (first round)
2. (Russia) Konstantin Kravchuk / (Ukraine) Denys Molchanov (quarterfinals)
3. (Italy) Flavio Cipolla / (Spain) Adrián Menéndez-Maceiras (semifinals)
4. (Chinese Taipei) Chen Ti / (Chinese Taipei) Huang Liang-chi (final)

== Draw ==
Key

- Q = Qualifier
- WC = Wild card
- LL = Lucky loser
- Alt = Alternate
- ITF = ITF entry
- PR = Protected ranking
- SR = Special ranking
- SE = Special exempt
- JE = Junior exempt
- JR = Junior Accelerator Programme entrant
- CO = College Accelerator Programme entrant
- NG = Next Gen Accelerator Program entrant
- w/o = Walkover
- r = Retired
- d = Defaulted

=== Draw ===
First round
1	(Belarus) S Betov (Belarus) A Bury	7^{7}	5	[7]
(Belarus) Y Shyla (Belarus) A Vasilevski	6^{5}	7	[10]
(Italy) T Fabbiano (Italy) L Vanni	3	4
(Spain) Ivan Arenas-Gualda (Spain) E López-Pérez	6	6
4	(Chinese Taipei) T Chen (Chinese Taipei) L-c Huang	6	6
(Belarus) E Gerasimov (Russia) Alexander Lobkov	4	4
(Serbia) I Bozoljac (United Kingdom) D Rice	6	6
(Spain) R Ortega Olmedo (Spain) Jaime Pulgar-Garcia	2	2
(Lithuania) R Berankis (Russia) D Matsukevich	5	6	[10]
WC	(Kazakhstan) T Khabibulin (Kazakhstan) D Popko	7	2	[5]
(Turkey) M İlhan (Uzbekistan) Shonigmatjon Shofayziyev	2	4
3	(Italy) F Cipolla (Spain) A Menéndez-Maceiras	6	6
PR	(Ukraine) S Bubka (Switzerland) M Chiudinelli	6	5	[10]
WC	(Russia) K Khachanov (Russia) A Rublev	4	7	[3]
WC	(Russia) Kirill Dmitriev (Kazakhstan) R Khassanov	0	3
2	(Russia) K Kravchuk (Ukraine) D Molchanov	6	6

Quarterfinals
(Belarus) Y Shyla (Belarus) A Vasilevski	6	6
(Spain) I Arenas-Gualda (Spain) E López-Pérez	2	4
4	(Chinese Taipei) T Chen (Chinese Taipei) L-c Huang	6	6
(Serbia) I Bozoljac (United Kingdom) D Rice	4	4
(Lithuania) R Berankis (Russia) D Matsukevich	5	4
3	(Italy) F Cipolla (Spain) A Menéndez-Maceiras	7	6
PR	(Ukraine) S Bubka (Switzerland) M Chiudinelli	6	6
2	(Russia) K Kravchuk (Ukraine) D Molchanov	3	4

Semifinals
(Belarus) Y Shyla (Belarus) A Vasilevski	2	3
4	(Chinese Taipei) T Chen (Chinese Taipei) L-c Huang	6	6
3	(Italy) F Cipolla (Spain) A Menéndez-Maceiras	3	7	[5]
PR	(Ukraine) S Bubka (Switzerland) M Chiudinelli	6	5	[10]

Final
4	(Chinese Taipei) T Chen (Chinese Taipei) L-c Huang	3	4
PR	(Ukraine) S Bubka (Switzerland) M Chiudinelli	6	6
