= 2014 President's Cup – Men's singles =

Men's singles
- 2014 President's Cup (tennis)

Final
- Champion: (Lithuania) Ričardas Berankis
- Runner-up: (Turkey) Marsel İlhan
- Score: 7–5, 5–7, 6–3

Events
| Singles | men | women |
| Doubles | men | women |
- President's Cup (tennis)

Ričardas Berankis won the tournament, beating Marsel İlhan 7–5, 5–7, 6–3

== Seeds ==
1. (Kazakhstan) Mikhail Kukushkin (quarterfinals)
2. (Slovenia) Blaž Kavčič (quarterfinals)
3. (Lithuania) Ričardas Berankis (champion)
4. (Turkey) Marsel İlhan (final)
5. (Russia) Alexander Kudryavtsev (second round)
6. (Switzerland) Marco Chiudinelli (second round)
7. (Italy) Thomas Fabbiano (second round)
8. (Spain) Adrián Menéndez-Maceiras (quarterfinals)

== Draw ==
Key

- Q = Qualifier
- WC = Wild card
- LL = Lucky loser
- Alt = Alternate
- ITF = ITF entry
- PR = Protected ranking
- SR = Special ranking
- SE = Special exempt
- JE = Junior exempt
- JR = Junior Accelerator Programme entrant
- CO = College Accelerator Programme entrant
- NG = Next Gen Accelerator Program entrant
- w/o = Walkover
- r = Retired
- d = Defaulted

=== Finals ===
Semifinals
(Belarus) Egor Gerasimov | 1 | 2
4 | (Turkey) Marsel İlhan | 6 | 6
3 | (Lithuania) Ričardas Berankis | 5 | 6 | 6
(United Kingdom) Kyle Edmund | 7 | 4 | 0

Final
4 | (Turkey) Marsel İlhan | 5 | 7 | 3
3 | (Lithuania) Ričardas Berankis | 7 | 5 | 6

=== Top half ===
First round
1 | (Kazakhstan) M Kukushkin | 6 | 6
(Chinese Taipei) L-c Huang | 1 | 4
Q | (Spain) Jaime Pulgar-Garcia | 6 | 6
(Spain) Ivan Arenas-Gualda | 2 | 3
Q | (Russia) M Biryukov | 3 | 2
(Belarus) E Gerasimov | 6 | 6
WC | (Kazakhstan) D Yevseyev | 2 | 2
5 | (Russia) A Kudryavtsev | 6 | 6
4 | (Turkey) M İlhan | 6 | 6
(Serbia) I Bozoljac | 1 | 0
(Ukraine) D Molchanov | 6 | 6
(Russia) V Rudnev | 2 | 2
(Italy) F Cipolla | 7^{7} | 3
Q | (Belarus) Y Shyla | 6^{2} | 0r
(Russia) Alexander Lobkov | 3 | 0
6 | (Switzerland) M Chiudinelli | 6 | 6

Second round
1 | (Kazakhstan) M Kukushkin | 6 | 6
Q | (Spain) J Pulgar-Garcia | 1 | 3
(Belarus) E Gerasimov | 7^{9} | 6
5 | (Russia) A Kudryavtsev | 6^{7} | 2
4 | (Turkey) M İlhan | 6 | 6
(Ukraine) D Molchanov | 3 | 2
(Italy) F Cipolla | 6 | 6
6 | (Switzerland) M Chiudinelli | 2 | 0

Quarterfinals
1 | (Kazakhstan) M Kukushkin | 6 | 2 | 6^{5}
(Belarus) E Gerasimov | 4 | 6 | 7^{7}
4 | (Turkey) M İlhan | 6 | 7^{7}
(Italy) F Cipolla | 4 | 6^{4}

Semifinals
(Belarus) E Gerasimov | 1 | 2
4 | (Turkey) M İlhan | 6 | 6

=== Bottom half ===
First round
8 | (Spain) A Menéndez-Maceiras | 3 | 6 | 6
(Russia) K Kravchuk | 6 | 3 | 2
(Chinese Taipei) T Chen | 4 | 2
(Spain) R Ortega-Olmedo | 6 | 6
(Italy) L Vanni | 2 | 3
(Spain) E López-Pérez | 6 | 6
WC | (Russia) A Rublev | 3 | 5
3 | (Lithuania) R Berankis | 6 | 7
7 | (Italy) T Fabbiano | 6^{6} | 6 | 6
PR | (Ukraine) S Bubka | 7^{8} | 2 | 3
(United Kingdom) K Edmund | 6 | 6
Q | (Uzbekistan) T Ismailov | 3 | 2
WC | (Kazakhstan) D Popko | 6 | 2 | 7^{7}
(United Kingdom) D Rice | 3 | 6 | 6^{0}
WC | (Russia) K Khachanov | 4 | 2
2 | (Slovenia) B Kavčič | 6 | 6

Second round
8 | (Spain) A Menéndez-Maceiras | 6 | 6
(Spain) R Ortega-Olmedo | 3 | 4
(Spain) E López-Pérez | 4 | 4
3 | (Lithuania) R Berankis | 6 | 6
7 | (Italy) T Fabbiano | 5 | 1
(United Kingdom) K Edmund | 7 | 6
WC | (Kazakhstan) D Popko | 0 | 2
2 | (Slovenia) B Kavčič | 6 | 6

Quarterfinals
8 | (Spain) A Menéndez-Maceiras | 4 | 4
3 | (Lithuania) R Berankis | 6 | 6
(United Kingdom) K Edmund | 6 | 6
2 | (Slovenia) B Kavčič | 3 | 4

Semifinals
3 | (Lithuania) R Berankis | 5 | 6 | 6
(United Kingdom) K Edmund | 7 | 4 | 0
