= Maria João Koehler =

Portuguese tennis player (born 1992)

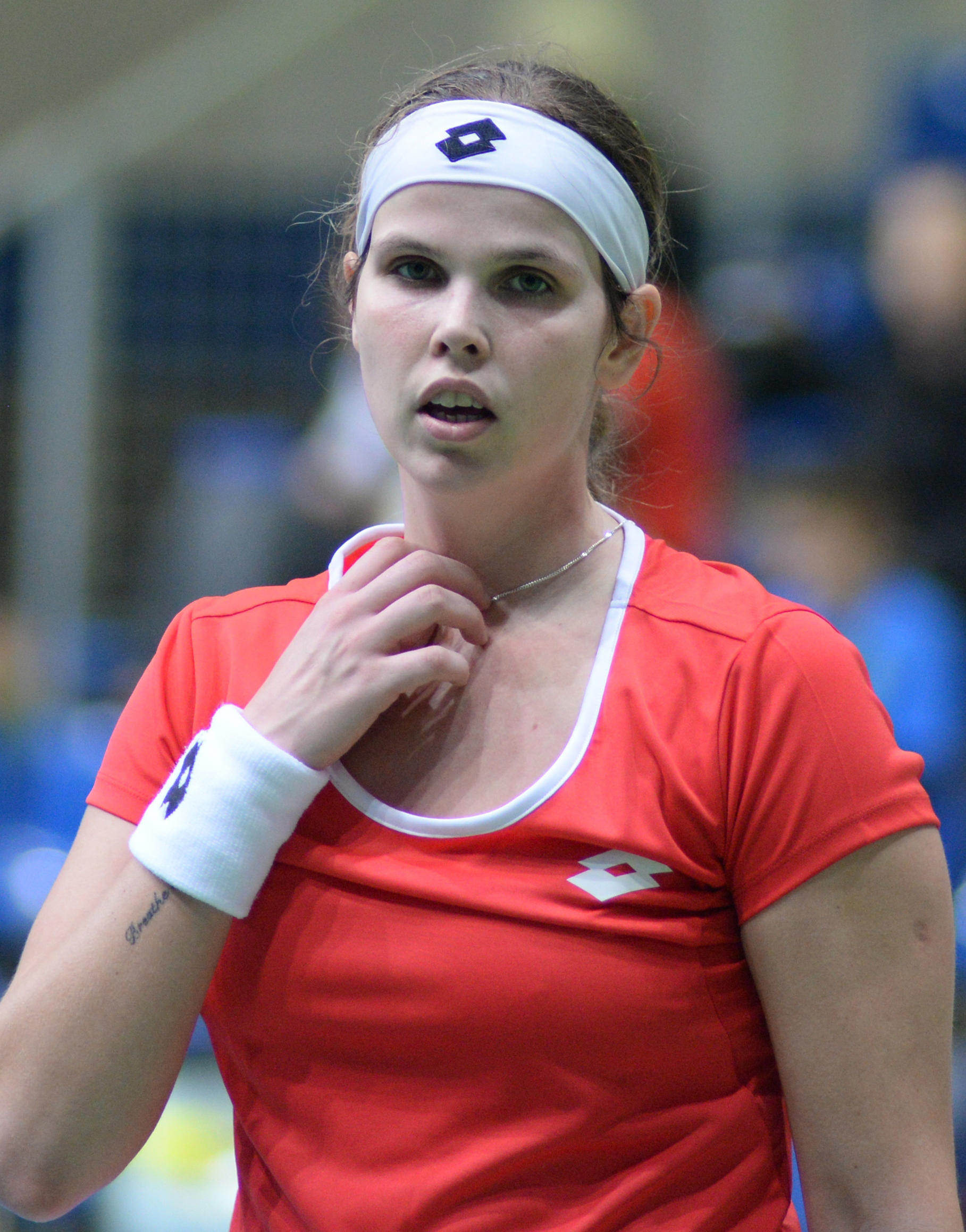
- Koehler at the 2015 Fed Cup
- Country (sports): Portugal
- Residence: Porto, Portugal
- Born: 8 October 1992 (age 32); Porto
- Height: 1.74 m (5 ft 9 in)
- Retired: 2018
- Prize money: $332,492

Singles
- Career record: 266–197
- Career titles: 4 ITF
- Highest ranking: No. 102 (25 February 2013)

Grand Slam singles results
- Australian Open: 2R (2013)
- French Open: 1R (2013)
- Wimbledon: 1R (2013)
- US Open: 1R (2013)

Doubles
- Career record: 54–43
- Career titles: 4 ITF
- Highest ranking: No. 151 (18 June 2012)

Grand Slam doubles results
- Wimbledon: Q1 (2013)

Team competitions
- Fed Cup: 11–20

Maria João Koehler (born 8 October 1992) is a retired Portuguese tennis player.

Koehler won four singles and four doubles titles on the ITF Women's Circuit in her career. On 25 February 2013, she reached her best singles ranking of world No. 102. On 18 June 2012, she peaked at No. 151 in the doubles rankings.

Playing for the Portugal Fed Cup team, Koehler has a win–loss record of 11–20.

== Career ==
Born in Porto, Koehler made her debut on the ITF Women's Circuit at the age of 14 at a $10k event in Braga. Having qualified for the main draw, she lost her first match to Catarina Ferreira.

She made her WTA Tour main-draw debut at the 2009 Estoril Open. Having been awarded a wildcard, she played world No. 77, Kristina Barrois, in the first round, losing in straight sets.

== Grand Slam singles performance timeline ==
Key
W	F	SF	QF	#R	RR	Q#	DNQ	A	NH

(W) winner; (F) finalist; (SF) semifinalist; (QF) quarterfinalist; (#R) rounds 4, 3, 2, 1; (RR) round-robin stage; (Q#) qualification round; (DNQ) did not qualify; (A) absent; (NH) not held; (SR) strike rate (events won / competed); (W–L) win–loss record.

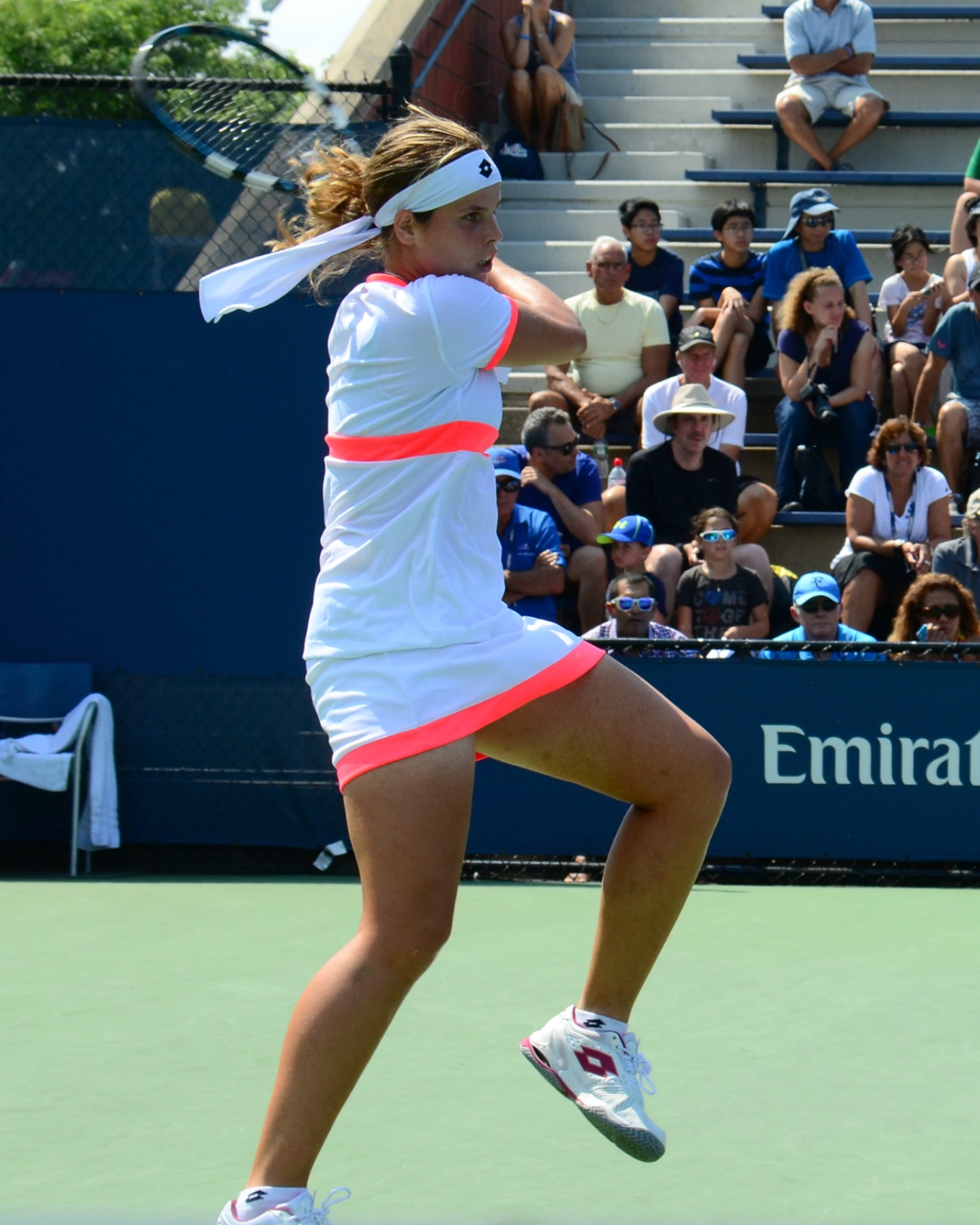
Koehler at the 2013 US Open, where she lost in round one to Alizé Cornet

Tournament	2011	2012	2013	2014	W–L
Australian Open	A	1R	2R	Q1	1–2
French Open	A	A	1R	A	0–1
Wimbledon	A	Q2	1R	A	0–1
US Open	Q1	Q2	1R	A	0–1
Win–loss	0–0	0–1	1–4	0–0	1–5

== ITF Circuit finals ==
=== Singles: 12 (4 titles, 8 runner-ups) ===
Legend $100,000 tournaments $50,000 tournaments $25,000 tournaments $10/15,000 tournaments	Finals by surface Hard (3–6) Clay (0–2) Carpet (1–0)

Result	W–L	Date	Tournament	Tier	Surface	Opponent	Score
Loss	0–1	Jun 2008	ITF Montemor-o-Novo, Portugal	10,000	Hard	(Canada) Mélanie Gloria	7–6^{(2)}, 3–6, 1–6
Win	1–1	May 2009	ITF Cantanhede, Portugal	10,000	Carpet	(Russia) Nanuli Pipiya	6–4, 2–6, 6–1
Win	2–1	Jun 2009	ITF Amarante, Portugal	10,000	Hard	(Canada) Mélanie Gloria	6–3, 6–2
Loss	2–2	Feb 2010	ITF Vale do Lobo, Portugal	10,000	Hard	(Italy) Julia Mayr	1–6, 1–6
Loss	2–3	Nov 2010	ITF Mallorca, Spain	10,000	Clay	(Spain) Lara Arruabarrena	6–7^{(2)}, 3–6
Loss	2–4	Jan 2011	ITF Rabat, Morocco	25,000	Clay	(Russia) Nina Bratchikova	6–3, 4–6, 1–6
Loss	2–5	Jul 2012	ITF Donetsk, Ukraine	50,000	Hard	(Serbia) Vesna Dolonc	2–6, 3–6
Win	3–5	Jul 2012	President's Cup, Kazakhstan	100,000	Hard	(Russia) Marta Sirotkina	7–5, 6–2
Loss	3–6	Oct 2012	Open de Touraine, France	50,000	Hard (i)	(Puerto Rico) Monica Puig	6–3, 4–6, 1–6
Loss	3–7	Jul 2013	President's Cup, Kazakhstan	100,000	Hard	(Ukraine) Nadiia Kichenok	4–6, 5–7
Loss	3–8	Sep 2016	ITF Ponta Delgada, Portugal	10,000	Hard	(Portugal) Inês Murta	4–6, 6–3, 6–7^{(7)}
Win	4–8	Jun 2018	Guimarães Ladies Open, Portugal	15,000	Hard	(India) Zeel Desai	6–1, 3–6, 6–1

=== Doubles: 8 (4 titles, 4 runner-ups) ===
Legend $75,000 tournaments $50,000 tournaments $25,000 tournaments $10,000 tournaments	Finals by surface Hard (2–0) Clay (2–3) Grass (0–1)

Result	W–L	Date	Tournament	Tier	Surface	Partner	Opponents	Score
Win	1–0	May 2009	ITF Vila Real de Santo António, Portugal	10,000	Clay	(Portugal) Joana Pangaio Pereira	(Spain) Rebeca Bou Nogueiro (Spain) Sheila Solsona Carcasona	2–2 ret.
Loss	1–1	Nov 2010	ITF Mallorca, Spain	10,000	Clay	(Russia) Avgusta Tsybysheva	(Spain) Lara Arruabarrena (Spain) Inés Ferrer Suárez	5–7, 2–6
Loss	1–2	Nov 2010	ITF Mallorca, Spain	10,000	Clay	(Russia) Avgusta Tsybysheva	(Romania) Diana Enache (Romania) Raluca Elena Platon	3–6, 6–7^{(3)}
Win	2–2	Jul 2011	ITF Cáceres, Spain	25,000	Hard	(Netherlands) Richèl Hogenkamp	(France) Victoria Larrière (France) Irena Pavlovic	6–4, 6–4
Loss	2–3	Aug 2011	ITF Sarajevo, Bosnia and Herzegovina	25,000	Clay	(Argentina) Florencia Molinero	(Croatia) Maria Abramović (Croatia) Ana Vrljić	7–5, 6–7^{(3)}, [4–10]
Win	3–3	Sep 2011	Zagreb Ladies Open, Croatia	50,000	Clay	(Hungary) Katalin Marosi	(Croatia) Maria Abramović (Romania) Mihaela Buzărnescu	6–0, 6–3
Win	4–3	Sep 2011	GB Pro-Series Shrewsbury, United Kingdom	75,000	Hard (i)	(Hungary) Katalin Marosi	(United Kingdom) Amanda Elliott (Australia) Johanna Konta	7–6^{(3)}, 6–1
Loss	4–4	Jun 2012	Nottingham Trophy, UK	50,000	Grass	(Hungary) Réka Luca Jani	(Australia) Sally Peers (Australia) Ashleigh Barty	6–7^{(2)}, 6–3, [5–10]
