= Syrym Abdukhalikov =

Kazakhstani tennis player

- Country (sports): Kazakhstan
- Born: 7 August 1987 (age 38) Almaty, Kazakhstan
- Height: 6 ft 3 in (191 cm)
- Plays: Right-handed
- Prize money: $29,495

Singles
- Career record: 3–3 (Davis Cup)
- Highest ranking: No. 544 (19 Oct 2009)

Doubles
- Career record: 0–2 (Davis Cup)
- Highest ranking: No. 453 (17 Aug 2009)

Syrym Abdukhalikov (born 7 August 1987) is a Kazakhstani former professional tennis player.

A native of Almaty, Abdukhalikov represented the Kazakhstan Davis Cup team in 2007 and 2008, featuring in four ties, for singles wins over Yu Xinyuan (China), Weerapat Doakmaiklee (Thailand) and Patrick John Tierro (Philippines).

After reaching his career high singles ranking of 544 in the world in 2009, he left the tour to study in the United States and played collegiate tennis for Tennessee Tech, debuting for the Golden Eagles in 2011.

Abdukhalikov won four ITF Futures titles, two in singles and two in doubles.

== ITF Futures titles ==
=== Singles: (2) ===
No.	Date	Tournament	Surface	Opponent	Score
1.	May 2007	Greece F1, Kos	Hard	(United Kingdom) Miles Kasiri	6–4, 6–2
2.	Oct 2008	Pakistan F2, Islamabad	Clay	(Ukraine) Vadim Alekseenko	6–4, 6–3

=== Doubles: (2) ===
No.	Date	Tournament	Surface	Partner	Opponents	Score
1.	Jul 2007	Georgia F2, Tbilisi	Hard	(Belarus) Sergey Betov	(Monaco) Clément Morel (France) Charles Roche	2–0, ret.
2.	Apr 2009	Uzbekistan F2, Namangan	Hard	(Kazakhstan) Alexey Kedryuk	(Russia) Alexei Filenkov (Russia) Andrei Plotniy	6–4, 3–6, [10–6]

== See also ==
- List of Kazakhstan Davis Cup team representatives
