= President's Cup (tennis) =

Tournament information
- Location: Astana, Kazakhstan
- Venue: National Tennis Centre Beeline arena
- Surface: Hard
- Website: website
ATP Tour
- Category: ATP Challenger Tour
- Draw: 32S/17Q/16D
- Prize money: $60,000 (2021-), $125,000+H (-2019)
WTA Tour
- Category: ITF Women's Circuit
- Draw: 32S/32Q/16D
- Prize money: $100,000+H

The President's Cup, known as the Astana Challenger is a tennis tournament played on outdoor hardcourts. It is currently part of the ATP Challenger Tour and the ITF Women's Circuit and has been held annually in Astana, Kazakhstan, since 2007.

== Past finals ==
=== Men's singles ===
Year	Champion	Runner-up	Score
2026	(Japan) Hayato Matsuoka	(Tunisia) Aziz Dougaz	0–6, 6–1, 7–6^{(7–5)}
2025	(Norway) Nicolai Budkov Kjær	(Italy) Alexandr Binda	6–4, 6–3
2024	(Bulgaria) Dimitar Kuzmanov	(Georgia (country)) Saba Purtseladze	6–4, 6–3
2023	(Kazakhstan) Denis Yevseyev	(Uzbekistan) Khumoyun Sultanov	7–5, 2–6, 6–4
2022	Roman Safiullin	(Kazakhstan) Denis Yevseyev	2–6, 6–4, 7–6^{(7–2)}
2021 (2)	(Russia) Andrey Kuznetsov	(Australia) Jason Kubler	6–3, 2–1 ret.
2021 (1)	(Australia) Max Purcell	(United Kingdom) Jay Clarke	3–6, 6–4, 7–6^{(8–6)}
2020	Tournament cancelled due to the COVID-19 pandemic		
2019	(Russia) Evgeny Donskoy	(United States) Sebastian Korda	7–6^{(7–5)}, 3–6, 6–4
2018	(Austria) Sebastian Ofner	(Germany) Daniel Brands	7–6^{(7–5)}, 6–3
2017	(Belarus) Egor Gerasimov	(Kazakhstan) Mikhail Kukushkin	7–6^{(11–9)}, 4–6, 6–4
2016	(Russia) Evgeny Donskoy	(Russia) Konstantin Kravchuk	6–3, 6–3
2015	(Kazakhstan) Mikhail Kukushkin	(Russia) Evgeny Donskoy	6–2, 6–2
2014 (2)	(Lithuania) Ričardas Berankis	(Turkey) Marsel İlhan	7–5, 5–7, 6–3
2014 (1)	(Kazakhstan) Andrey Golubev	(Luxembourg) Gilles Müller	6–4, 6–4
2013	(Israel) Dudi Sela	(Kazakhstan) Mikhail Kukushkin	5–7, 6–2, 7–6
2012	(Russia) Evgeny Donskoy	(Turkey) Marsel İlhan	6–3, 6–4
2011	(Kazakhstan) Mikhail Kukushkin	(Ukraine) Sergei Bubka	6–3, 6–4
2010	(Croatia) Ivan Dodig	(Russia) Igor Kunitsyn	6–4, 6–3
2009	(Kazakhstan) Andrey Golubev	(Ukraine) Illya Marchenko	6–3, 6–3
2008	(Kazakhstan) Andrey Golubev	(France) Laurent Recouderc	1–6, 7–5, 6–3
2007	(Russia) Mikhail Ledovskikh	(Germany) Björn Phau	7–6, 6–3

=== Men's doubles ===
Year	Champions	Runners-up	Score
2026	(Japan) Taisei Ichikawa (Japan) Masamichi Imamura	Petr Bar Biryukov (Kazakhstan) Grigoriy Lomakin	3–6, 7–6^{(7–4)}, [10–5]
2025	(Japan) Taisei Ichikawa (Japan) Kokoro Isomura	(Philippines) Francis Alcantara (South Korea) Park Ui-sung	7–5, 2–6, [10–5]
2024	Egor Agafonov; Ilia Simakin	(Uzbekistan) Denis Istomin; Evgeny Karlovskiy	6–4, 6–3
2023	(India) S D Prajwal Dev (India) Niki Kaliyanda Poonacha	(Japan) Toshihide Matsui (Japan) Kaito Uesugi	6–3, 7–6^{(7–4)}
2022	(South Korea) Nam Ji-sung (South Korea) Song Min-kyu	(Czech Republic) Andrew Paulson (Czech Republic) David Poljak	6–2, 3–6, [10–6]
2021 (2)	(Chinese Taipei) Hsu Yu-hsiou (Zimbabwe) Benjamin Lock	(Ukraine) Oleksii Krutykh (Kazakhstan) Grigoriy Lomakin	6–3, 6–4
2021 (1)	(Chinese Taipei) Hsu Yu-hsiou (Zimbabwe) Benjamin Lock	(Canada) Peter Polansky (Ukraine) Sergiy Stakhovsky	2–6, 6–1, [10–7]
2020	Tournament cancelled due to the COVID-19 pandemic		
2019	(Kazakhstan) Andrey Golubev (Kazakhstan) Aleksandr Nedovyesov	(South Korea) Chung Yun-seong (South Korea) Nam Ji-sung	6–4, 6–4
2018	(Russia) Mikhail Elgin (Belarus) Yaraslav Shyla	(India) Arjun Kadhe (Kazakhstan) Denis Yevseyev	7–5, 7–6^{(8–6)}
2017	(Japan) Toshihide Matsui (India) Vishnu Vardhan	(Russia) Evgeny Karlovskiy (Russia) Evgeny Tyurnev	7–6^{(7–3)}, 6–7^{(5–7)}, [10–7]
2016	(Belarus) Yaraslav Shyla (Belarus) Andrei Vasilevski	(Russia) Mikhail Elgin (Russia) Alexander Kudryavtsev	6–4, 6–4
2015	(Russia) Konstantin Kravchuk (Ukraine) Denys Molchanov	(South Korea) Chung Yun-seong (Uzbekistan) Jurabek Karimov	6–2, 6–2
2014 (2)	(Ukraine) Sergei Bubka (Switzerland) Marco Chiudinelli	(Chinese Taipei) Chen Ti (Chinese Taipei) Huang Liang-chi	6–3, 6–4
2014 (1)	(Belarus) Sergey Betov (Belarus) Alexander Bury	(Kazakhstan) Andrey Golubev (Kazakhstan) Evgeny Korolev	6–1, 6–4
2013	(Italy) Riccardo Ghedin (Italy) Claudio Grassi	(Kazakhstan) Andrey Golubev (Kazakhstan) Mikhail Kukushkin	3–6, 6–3, [10–8]
2012	(Russia) Konstantin Kravchuk (Ukraine) Denys Molchanov	(Slovakia) Karol Beck (Slovakia) Kamil Čapkovič	6–4, 6–3
2011	(Russia) Konstantin Kravchuk (Ukraine) Denys Molchanov	(Spain) Arnau Brugués-Davi (Tunisia) Malek Jaziri	7–6^{(7–4)}, 6–7^{(1–7)}, [10–3]
2010	(United Kingdom) Colin Fleming (United Kingdom) Ross Hutchins	(Russia) Michail Elgin (Russia) Alexander Kudryavtsev	6–3, 7–6^{(12–10)}
2009	(United Kingdom) Jonathan Marray (United Kingdom) Jamie Murray	(United States) David Martin (Netherlands) Rogier Wassen	4–6, 6–3, [10–5]
2008	(Russia) Michail Elgin (Russia) Alexander Kudryavtsev	(Switzerland) George Bastl (Switzerland) Marco Chiudinelli	6–4, 6–7, [10–8]
2007	(Germany) Daniel Brands (Australia) Adam Feeney	(Slovakia) Kamil Čapkovič (Croatia) Ivan Dodig	6–2, 6–4

=== Women's singles ===
Year	Champion	Runner-up	Score
2026	(Kazakhstan) Asylzhan Arystanbekova	(Japan) Haruna Arakawa	6–2, 6–2
2025	Ekaterina Maklakova	Edda Mamedova	6–4, 2–6, 6–4
2024	Tatiana Prozorova	Alexandra Shubladze	7–5, 6–7^{(5–7)}, 6–1
2023	Polina Iatcenko	Aliona Falei	6–3, 6–3
2022	(Japan) Moyuka Uchijima	(Serbia) Natalija Stevanović	6–3, 7–6^{(7–2)}
2021	(Georgia (country)) Mariam Bolkvadze	(Russia) Valeria Savinykh	4–6, 6–3, 6–2
2020	Tournament cancelled due to the COVID-19 pandemic		
2019	(Czech Republic) Marie Bouzková	(Serbia) Natalija Kostić	6–3, 6–3
2018	(Georgia (country)) Ekaterine Gorgodze	(Uzbekistan) Sabina Sharipova	6–4, 6–1
2017	(China) Zhang Shuai	(Belgium) Ysaline Bonaventure	6–3, 6–4
2016	(Ukraine) Alyona Sotnikova	(Russia) Veronika Kudermetova	6–2, 6–3
2015	(Russia) Natela Dzalamidze	(Russia) Ksenia Pervak	6–6 ret.
2014	(Russia) Vitalia Diatchenko	(Turkey) Çağla Büyükakçay	6–4, 3–6, 6–2
2013	(Ukraine) Nadiia Kichenok	(Portugal) Maria João Koehler	6–4, 7–5
2012	(Portugal) Maria João Koehler	(Russia) Marta Sirotkina	7–5, 6–2
2011	(Russia) Vitalia Diatchenko	(Uzbekistan) Akgul Amanmuradova	6–4, 6–1
2010	(Russia) Evgeniya Rodina	(Belarus) Ekaterina Dzehalevich	4–6, 6–1, 6–4
2009	(Belarus) Anastasiya Yakimova	(Austria) Nikola Hofmanova	6–0, 6–4

=== Women's doubles ===
Year	Champions	Runners-up	Score
2026	(South Korea) Kim Eun-chae (South Korea) Lee Ha-eum	Mariia Tkacheva; Daria Zelinskaya	6–1, 6–4
2025	(Kazakhstan) Asylzhan Arystanbekova (Kazakhstan) Ingkar Dyussebay	Ekaterina Khayrutdinova; Anna Kubareva	6–7^{(3–7)}, 6–4, [10–3]
2024	Anastasia Gasanova; Ekaterina Shalimova	Vitalia Diatchenko (Kazakhstan) Zhanel Rustemova	7–6^{(7–4)}, 2–6, [10–7]
2023	(Japan) Haruna Arakawa (Japan) Erika Sema	(India) Shrivalli Bhamidipaty (India) Vaidehi Chaudhari	6–7^{(6–8)}, 6–3, [10–5]
2022	Mariia Tkacheva; Anastasia Zolotareva	(Japan) Momoko Kobori (Japan) Moyuka Uchijima	4–6, 6–1, [10–4]
2021	(Russia) Alina Charaeva (Russia) Maria Timofeeva	(Russia) Evgeniya Levashova (Brazil) Laura Pigossi	7–6^{(7–5)}, 2–6, [10–6]
2020	Tournament cancelled due to the COVID-19 pandemic		
2019	(Czech Republic) Marie Bouzková (Germany) Vivian Heisen	(Russia) Vlada Koval (Russia) Kamilla Rakhimova	7–6^{(10–8)}, 6–1
2018	(Turkey) Berfu Cengiz (Kazakhstan) Anna Danilina	(Uzbekistan) Akgul Amanmuradova (Georgia (country)) Ekaterine Gorgodze	3–6, 6–3, [10–7]
2017	(Russia) Natela Dzalamidze (Russia) Veronika Kudermetova	(Belgium) Ysaline Bonaventure (United Kingdom) Naomi Broady	6–2, 6–0
2016	(Russia) Natela Dzalamidze (Russia) Veronika Kudermetova	(Russia) Polina Monova (Russia) Yana Sizikova	6–2, 6–3
2015	(Russia) Natela Dzalamidze (Russia) Alena Tarasova	(Turkey) Başak Eraydın (Kyrgyzstan) Ksenia Palkina	6–0, 6–1
2014	(Russia) Vitalia Diatchenko (Russia) Margarita Gasparyan	(Belgium) Michaela Boev (Germany) Anna-Lena Friedsam	6–4, 6–1
2013	(Ukraine) Lyudmyla Kichenok (Ukraine) Nadiia Kichenok	(Russia) Nina Bratchikova (Russia) Valeria Solovyeva	6–2, 6–2
2012	(Georgia (country)) Oksana Kalashnikova (Russia) Marta Sirotkina	(Ukraine) Lyudmyla Kichenok (Ukraine) Nadiia Kichenok	3–6, 6–4, [10–2]
2011	(Russia) Vitalia Diatchenko (Kazakhstan) Galina Voskoboeva	(Uzbekistan) Akgul Amanmuradova (Russia) Alexandra Panova	6–3, 6–4
2010	(Russia) Nina Bratchikova (Russia) Ekaterina Ivanova	(Ukraine) Yuliana Fedak (Ukraine) Anastasiya Vasylyeva	6–4, 6–4
2009	(Ukraine) Yuliana Fedak (Belarus) Darya Kustova	(Russia) Nina Bratchikova (Romania) Ágnes Szatmári	6–4, 7–5
