= 2021 President's Cup – Women's singles =

Women's singles
- 2021 President's Cup

Final
- Champion: (Georgia (country)) Mariam Bolkvadze
- Runner-up: (Russia) Valeria Savinykh
- Score: 4–6, 6–3, 6–2

Events
Singles	men	women
Doubles	men	women
- President's Cup

Marie Bouzková was the defending champion, having won the previous edition in 2019, however she chose to participate in Prague instead.

Mariam Bolkvadze won the title, defeating Valeria Savinykh in the final, 4–6, 6–3, 6–2.

== Seeds ==
1. (Georgia (country)) Mariam Bolkvadze (champion)
2. (Russia) Valeria Savinykh (final)
3. (Ukraine) Daria Snigur (second round)
4. (Belarus) Yuliya Hatouka (semifinals)
5. (Brazil) Laura Pigossi (first round)
6. (Russia) Sofya Lansere (first round)
7. (Thailand) Peangtarn Plipuech (second round)
8. (Belarus) Anna Kubareva (quarterfinals)

== Draw ==
Key

- Q = Qualifier
- WC = Wild card
- LL = Lucky loser
- Alt = Alternate
- ITF = ITF entry
- PR = Protected ranking
- SR = Special ranking
- SE = Special exempt
- JE = Junior exempt
- JR = Junior Accelerator Programme entrant
- CO = College Accelerator Programme entrant
- NG = Next Gen Accelerator Program entrant
- w/o = Walkover
- r = Retired
- d = Defaulted

=== Finals ===
Semifinals
1	(Georgia (country)) Mariam Bolkvadze	6	6
4	(Belarus) Yuliya Hatouka	4	4
Q	(Russia) Ekaterina Shalimova	1	3
2	(Russia) Valeria Savinykh	6	6

Final
1	(Georgia (country)) Mariam Bolkvadze	4	6	6
2	(Russia) Valeria Savinykh	6	3	2

=== Top half ===
First round
1	(Georgia (country)) M Bolkvadze	6	6
PR	(Uzbekistan) S Sharipova	2	0
(Russia) E Kazionova	2	4
WC	(Kazakhstan) G Ainitdinova	6	6
(Belarus) S Talbi	6	6
Q	(Sweden) J Cabaj Awad	2	2
Q	(Lithuania) J Mikulskytė	6	6
5	(Brazil) L Pigossi	1	2
4	(Belarus) Y Hatouka	6	3	6
(Turkey) B Cengiz	2	6	1
(Russia) M Timofeeva	4	5
Q	(Czech Republic) A Sisková	6	7
Q	(Uzbekistan) N Abduraimova	6	4
WC	(Kazakhstan) Y Dmitrichenko	2	1^{r}
PR	(Japan) H Kuwata	6	2	2
8	(Belarus) A Kubareva	1	6	6

Second round
1	(Georgia (country)) M Bolkvadze	6	6
WC	(Kazakhstan) G Ainitdinova	2	1
(Belarus) S Talbi	6	6
Q	(Lithuania) J Mikulskytė	4	3
4	(Belarus) Y Hatouka	6	6
Q	(Czech Republic) A Sisková	2	1
Q	(Uzbekistan) N Abduraimova	6^{5}	3
8	(Belarus) A Kubareva	7^{7}	6

Quarterfinals
1	(Georgia (country)) M Bolkvadze	6	2
(Belarus) S Talbi	1	0^{r}
4	(Belarus) Y Hatouka	6	6
8	(Belarus) A Kubareva	3	4

Semifinals
1	(Georgia (country)) M Bolkvadze	6	6
4	(Belarus) Y Hatouka	4	4

=== Bottom half ===
First round
7/PR	(Thailand) P Plipuech	6	6
Q	(Slovakia) V Morvayová	4	2
Q	(Russia) E Shalimova	6	6
(Ukraine) M Zakarlyuk	1	3
Q	(Russia) A Tikhonova	6	6
(Russia) E Yashina	3	4
(Russia) V Koval	1	0
3	(Ukraine) D Snigur	6	6
6	(Russia) S Lansere	2	4
(Belarus) I Shymanovich	6	6
WC	(Kazakhstan) Z Kulambayeva	6	6
Q	(Russia) A Gabueva	2	1
(Russia) A Charaeva	6^{1}	1
PR	(Russia) V Yushchenko	7^{7}	6
WC	(Israel) L Glushko	3	6	2
2	(Russia) V Savinykh	6	3	6

Second round
7/PR	(Thailand) P Plipuech	3	3
Q	(Russia) E Shalimova	6	6
Q	(Russia) A Tikhonova	7^{8}	6
3	(Ukraine) D Snigur	6^{6}	4
(Belarus) I Shymanovich	6	6
WC	(Kazakhstan) Z Kulambayeva	3	3
PR	(Russia) V Yushchenko
2	(Russia) V Savinykh	w/o

Quarterfinals
Q	(Russia) E Shalimova	6	4	6
Q	(Russia) A Tikhonova	4	6	4
(Belarus) I Shymanovich	6^{5}	2
2	(Russia) V Savinykh	7^{7}	6

Semifinals
Q	(Russia) E Shalimova	1	3
2	(Russia) V Savinykh	6	6
