= Marie Bouzková career statistics =

Career finals
Discipline	Type	Won	Lost	Total
Singles	Grand Slam	–	–	0
Singles	WTA Finals	–	–	0
Singles	WTA 1000	–	–	0
Singles	WTA 500	–	1	1
Singles	WTA 250	4	5	9
Singles	Olympics	–	–	0
Singles	Total	4	6	10
Doubles	Grand Slam	–	–	0
Doubles	WTA Finals	–	–	0
Doubles	WTA 1000	2	–	2
Doubles	WTA 500	–	1	1
Doubles	WTA 250	5	2	7
Doubles	Olympics	–	–	0
Doubles	Total	7	3	10

This is a list of the main career statistics of professional Czech tennis player Marie Bouzková.

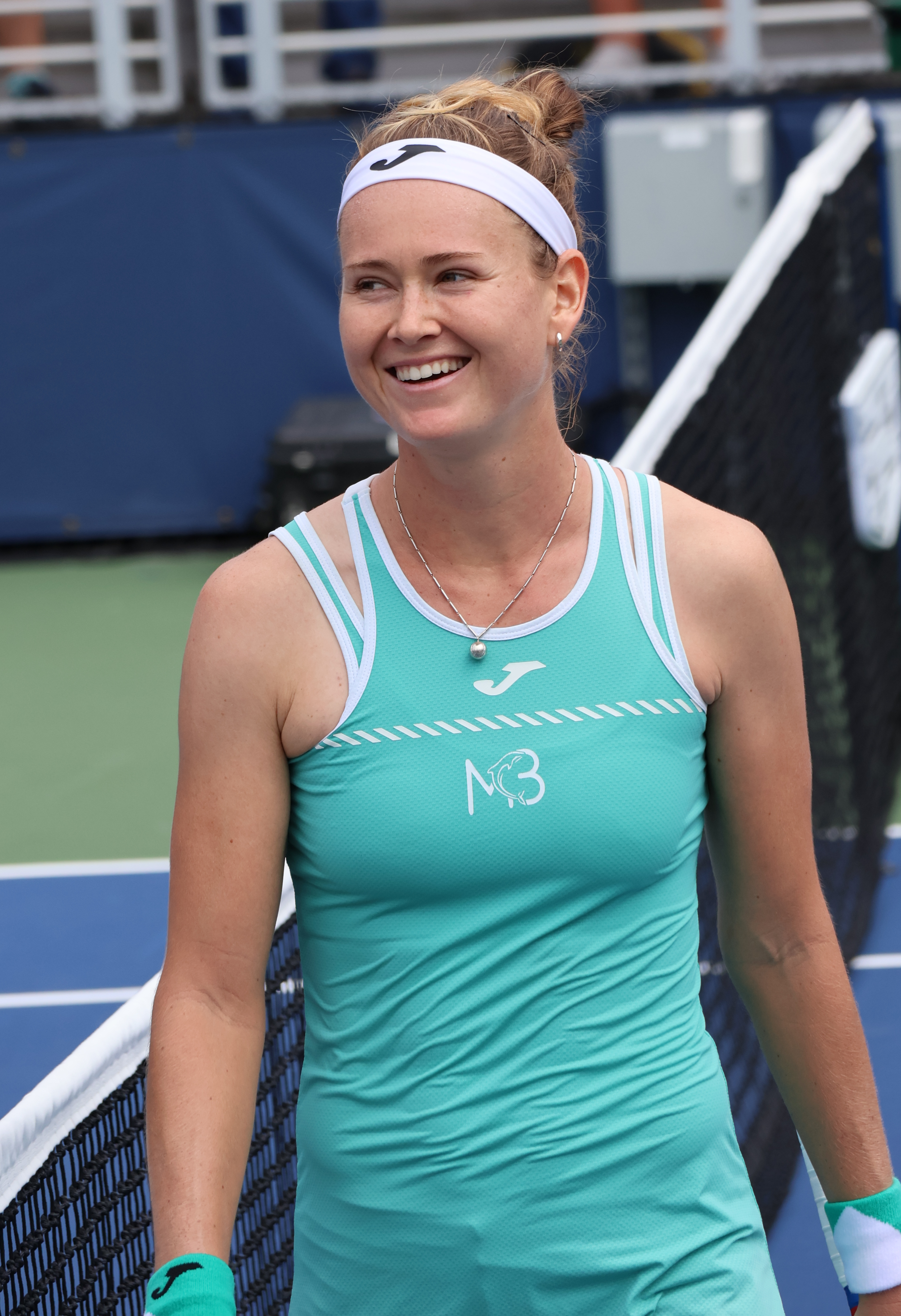
Bouzková at the 2023 US Open

== Performance timelines ==
Key
W	F	SF	QF	#R	RR	Q#	P#	DNQ	A	Z#	PO	G	S	B	NMS	NTI	P	NH

(W) winner; (F) finalist; (SF) semifinalist; (QF) quarterfinalist; (#R) rounds 4, 3, 2, 1; (RR) round-robin stage; (Q#) qualification round; (P#) preliminary round; (DNQ) did not qualify; (A) absent; (Z#) Davis/Fed Cup Zonal Group (with number indication) or (PO) play-off; (G) gold, (S) silver or (B) bronze Olympic/Paralympic medal; (NMS) not a Masters tournament; (NTI) not a Tier I tournament; (P) postponed; (NH) not held; (SR) strike rate (events won / competed); (W–L) win–loss record.
To avoid confusion and double counting, these charts are updated at the conclusion of a tournament or when the player's participation has ended.

Only main-draw results in WTA Tour, Grand Slam tournaments, Billie Jean King Cup (Fed Cup), Hopman Cup, United Cup and Olympic Games are included in win–loss records.

=== Singles ===
Current through the 2026 Ningbo Open.

Tournament	2015	2016	2017	2018	2019	2020	2021	2022	2023	2024	2025	2026	SR	W–L	Win%
Grand Slam tournaments
Australian Open	A	A	A	Q3	Q1	1R	1R	2R	1R	1R	1R	2R	0 / 7	2–7	22%
French Open	A	A	A	Q2	1R	1R	1R	2R (Note: Withdrew during the tournament. Not counted as a loss.)	1R	3R	3R	3R	0 / 8	7–7	50%
Wimbledon	A	A	Q2	Q2	2R	NH	1R	QF	4R	2R	2R	4R	0 / 7	13–7	65%
US Open	A	A	Q1	1R	1R	1R	1R	2R	3R	2R	1R	3R	0 / 9	6–9	40%
Win–Loss	0–0	0–0	0–0	0–1	1–3	0–3	0–4	7–3	5–4	4–4	3–4	8–4	0 / 31	28–30	48%
National representation
Billie Jean King Cup	A	A	A	A	A	A (Note: Edition is split into two years due to COVID-19.)		A	SF	QF	F_{QR}	W	1 / 3	5–2	71%
WTA 1000 tournaments
Qatar Open	NTI	A	NTI	A	NTI	A	NTI	A	NTI	2R	A	1R	0 / 2	1–2	33%
Dubai Championships	A	NTI	A	NTI	A	NTI	A	NTI	2R	1R	A	1R	0 / 3	1–3	25%
Indian Wells Open	A	A	A	A	Q1	NH	1R	3R	2R	2R	1R	1R	0 / 6	3–6	33%
Miami Open	A	A	A	A	Q2	NH	1R	2R	3R	1R	1R	3R	0 / 6	3–6	33%
Madrid Open	A	A	A	A	A	NH	1R	3R	3R	A	2R	2R	0 / 5	4–5	44%
Italian Open	A	A	A	A	A	2R	A	A	4R	A	3R	2R	0 / 4	5–4	56%
Canadian Open	A	A	A	A	SF	NH	1R	1R	3R	1R	3R	2R	0 / 7	8–7	53%
Cincinnati Open	A	A	A	A	A	3R	Q2	2R	QF	1R	A	4R	0 / 5	8–4	67%
China Open	A	A	A	A	Q2	Not held			1R	A	4R	3R	0 / 3	4–3	57%
Wuhan Open	A	A	A	A	2R	Not held				1R	2R	2R	0 / 4	3–4	43%
Guadalajara Open	Not held							SF	A	Not Tier I			0 / 1	4–1	80%
Win–Loss	0–0	0–0	0–0	0–0	5–2	3–2	0–4	10–5	10–8	2–7	9–7	5–10	0 / 46	44–45	49%
Career statistics
	2015	2016	2017	2018	2019	2020	2021	2022	2023	2024	2025	2026	SR	W–L	Win %
Tournaments	1	0	2	3	10	10	20	16	21	22	19	23	Career total: 147		
Titles	0	0	0	0	0	0	0	1	0	0	1	2	Career total: 4		
Finals	0	0	0	0	0	1	1	2	1	2	1	2	Career total: 10		
Hardcourt Win–Loss	0–1	0–0	0–1	1–3	8–7	8–8	12–13	22–9	18–15	18–16	19–12	18–16	2 / 102	124–101	55%
Clay Win–Loss	0–0	0–0	0–1	0–0	0–2	1–2	1–4	3–2	3–4	6–2	8–5	9–4	1 / 28	31–26	54%
Grass Win–Loss	0–0	0–0	0–0	0–0	1–1	0–0	2–3	4–2	3–3	2–3	1–2	9–2	1 / 17	22–16	58%
Overall Win–Loss	0–1	0–0	0–2	1–3	9–10	9–10	15–20	29–13	24–22	26–21	28–19	37–22	4 / 146	177–143	55%
Win %	0%	–	0%	25%	47%	47%	43%	69%	52%	55%	60%	63%	Career total: 55%		
Year-end ranking (Note: 2013: WTA ranking – 1195, 2014: WTA ranking – 497.)	378	260	187	142	57	51	89	26	34	45	43		$6,845,449		

=== Doubles ===
Current through the 2026 Wuhan Open.

Tournament	2019	2020	2021	2022	2023	2024	2025	2026	SR	W–L	Win%
Grand Slam tournaments
Australian Open	A	1R	1R	2R	2R	1R	1R	2R	0 / 7	3–7	30%
French Open	A	2R	1R	A	QF	2R	A	2R	0 / 5	6–5	55%
Wimbledon	A	NH	QF	2R	SF	2R	2R	2R	0 / 6	11–6	65%
US Open	A	A	QF	A	A	3R	A	2R	0 / 3	6–3	67%
Win–Loss	0–0	1–2	6–4	2–2	8–3	4–4	1–2	4–4	0 / 21	26–21	55%
Year-end championships
WTA Finals	DNQ	NH	Alt	Did Not Qualify					0 / 0	0–0	–
WTA 1000 tournaments
Qatar Open	NTI	A	NTI	A	NTI	SF	A	2R	0 / 2	4–2	67%
Dubai Championships	A	NTI	A	NTI	1R	2R	A	2R	0 / 3	2–3	40%
Indian Wells Open	A	NH	QF	QF (Note: Withdrew during the tournament. Not counted as a loss.)	A	2R	1R	A	0 / 4	5–3	63%
Miami Open	A	NH	A	1R	1R	A	1R	2R	0 / 4	1–4	20%
Madrid Open	A	NH	A	2R	A	A	A	2R	0 / 2	2–2	50%
Italian Open	A	A	A	A	SF	A	A	2R	0 / 2	4–2	67%
Canadian Open	A	NH	A	2R	1R	2R	A	1R	0 / 4	2–2	50%
Cincinnati Open	A	1R	1R	2R	A	A	A	W	1 / 4	6–3	67%
China Open	A	Not Held			W	A	A	1R	1 / 2	5–1	83%
Wuhan Open	A	Not Held				2R	A	2R	0 / 2	2–1	67%
Win–Loss	0–0	0–1	2–2	5–3	8–4	7–4	0–2	11–7	2 / 29	33–23	60%
Career statistics
	2019	2020	2021	2022	2023	2024	2025	2026	SR	W–L	Win%
Tournaments	4	7	15	10	12	17	8	16	Career total: 89		
Titles	0	0	2	1	2	0	1	1	Career total: 7		
Finals	0	1	3	1	2	1	1	1	Career total: 10		
Overall Win–Loss	1–4	7–7	24–13	12–7	20–10	20–15	7–6	18–13	7 / 89	109–75	59%
Win %	20%	50%	65%	63%	67%	57%	54%	58%	Career total: 59%		
Year-end ranking	214	111	34	73	23	49					

=== Mixed doubles ===
Tournament	2021	...	2026	SR	W–L	Win%
Australian Open	A		A	0 / 0	0–0	–
French Open	A		A	0 / 0	0–0	–
Wimbledon	1R		A	0 / 1	0–1	0%
US Open	A			0 / 0	0–0	–
Win–loss	0–1		0–0	0 / 1	0–1	0%

== WTA 1000 tournaments finals ==
=== Doubles: 1 (title) ===
Result	Year	Tournament	Surface	Partner	Opponents	Score
Win	2023	China Open	Hard	(Spain) Sara Sorribes Tormo	(Chinese Taipei) Chan Hao-ching (Mexico) Giuliana Olmos	3–6, 6–0, [10–4]
Win	2026	Cincinnati Open	Hard	(Czech Republic) Linda Nosková	(Belgium) Magali Kempen; Alexandra Panova	6–1, 6–2

== WTA Tour finals ==
=== Singles: 10 (4 titles, 6 runner-ups) ===
Legend WTA 500 (0–1) International / WTA 250 (4–5)	Finals by surface Hard (2–5) Clay (1–1) Grass (1–0)	Finals by setting Outdoor (4–6)

Result	W–L	Date	Tournament	Tier	Surface	Opponent	Score
Loss	0–1	Mar 2020	Monterrey Open, Mexico	International	Hard	(Ukraine) Elina Svitolina	5–7, 6–4, 4–6
Loss	0–2	Feb 2021	Phillip Island Trophy, Australia	WTA 250	Hard	(Russia) Daria Kasatkina	6–4, 2–6, 2–6
Loss	0–3	Feb 2022	Abierto Zapopan, Mexico	WTA 250	Hard	(United States) Sloane Stephens	5–7, 6–1, 2–6
Win	1–3	Jul 2022	Prague Open, Czech Republic	WTA 250	Hard	Anastasia Potapova	6–0, 6–3
Loss	1–4	Oct 2023	Jiangxi Open, China	WTA 250	Hard	(Czech Republic) Kateřina Siniaková	6–1, 6–7^{(5–7)}, 6–7^{(4–7)}
Loss	1–5	Apr 2024	Copa Colsanitas, Colombia	WTA 250	Clay	(Colombia) Camila Osorio	3–6, 6–7^{(5–7)}
Loss	1–6	Aug 2024	Washington Open, United States	WTA 500	Hard	(Spain) Paula Badosa	1–6, 6–4, 4–6
Win	2–6	Jul 2025	Prague Open, Czech Republic (2)	WTA 250	Hard	(Czech Republic) Linda Nosková	2–6, 6–1, 6–3
Win	3–6	Apr 2026	Copa Colsanitas, Colombia	WTA 250	Clay	(Hungary) Panna Udvardy	6–7^{(7–9)}, 6–2, 6–2
Win	4–6	Jun 2026	Nottingham Open, United Kingdom	WTA 250	Grass	(United States) Emma Navarro	7–6^{(7–5)}, 4–6, 6–2

=== Doubles: 10 (7 titles, 3 runner-ups) ===
Legend WTA 1000 (2–0) WTA 500 (0–1) International / WTA 250 (5–2)	Finals by surface Hard (4–2) Clay (1–1) Grass (2–0)	Finals by setting Outdoor (7–3)

Result	W–L	Date	Tournament	Tier	Surface	Partner	Opponents	Score
Loss	0–1	Aug 2020	Lexington Challenger, US	International	Hard	(Switzerland) Jil Teichmann	(United States) Hayley Carter (Brazil) Luisa Stefani	1–6, 5–7
Loss	0–2	Apr 2021	Charleston Open, US	WTA 500	Clay (green)	(Czech Republic) Lucie Hradecká	(United States) Nicole Melichar (Netherlands) Demi Schuurs	2–6, 4–6
Win	1–2	Jun 2021	Birmingham Classic, UK	WTA 250	Grass	(Czech Republic) Lucie Hradecká	(Tunisia) Ons Jabeur (Australia) Ellen Perez	6–4, 2–6, [10–8]
Win	2–2	Jul 2021	Prague Open, Czech Republic	WTA 250	Hard	(Czech Republic) Lucie Hradecká	(Slovakia) Viktória Kužmová (Serbia) Nina Stojanović	7–6^{(7–3)}, 6–4
Win	3–2	Apr 2022	İstanbul Cup, Turkey	WTA 250	Clay	(Spain) Sara Sorribes Tormo	(Georgia (country)) Natela Dzalamidze; Kamilla Rakhimova	6–3, 6–4
Win	4–2	Oct 2023	China Open, China	WTA 1000	Hard	(Spain) Sara Sorribes Tormo	(Chinese Taipei) Chan Hao-ching (Mexico) Giuliana Olmos	3–6, 6–0, [10–4]
Win	5–2	Oct 2023	Korea Open, South Korea	WTA 250	Hard	(United States) Bethanie Mattek-Sands	(Thailand) Luksika Kumkhum (Thailand) Peangtarn Plipuech	6–2, 6–1
Loss	5–3	Jan 2024	Auckland Classic, New Zealand	WTA 250	Hard	(United States) Bethanie Mattek-Sands	(Kazakhstan) Anna Danilina (Slovakia) Viktória Hrunčáková	3–6, 7–6^{(7–5)}, [8–10]
Win	6–3	Jun 2025	Eastbourne Open, UK	WTA 250	Grass	(Kazakhstan) Anna Danilina	(Chinese Taipei) Hsieh Su-wei (Australia) Maya Joint	6–4, 7–5
Win	7–3	Aug 2026	Cincinnati Open, US	WTA 1000	Hard	(Czech Republic) Linda Nosková	(Belgium) Magali Kempen; Alexandra Panova	6–1, 6–2

== WTA 125 finals ==
=== Singles: 1 (runner-up) ===
Result	Date	Tournament	Surface	Opponent	Score
Loss	Mar 2019	Abierto Zapopan, Mexico	Hard	(Russia) Veronika Kudermetova	2–6, 0–6

== ITF Circuit finals ==
=== Singles: 16 (12 titles, 4 runner-ups) ===
Legend W80 tournaments (1–0) W25 tournaments (3–2) W10/15 tournaments (8–2)	Finals by surface Hard (10–3) Clay (2–1)

Result	W–L	Date	Tournament	Tier	Surface	Opponent	Score
Win	1–0	Oct 2014	ITF Hilton Head, United States	10k	Clay	(Russia) Natalia Vikhlyantseva	7–5, 6–1
Win	2–0	Jun 2015	ITF Grand Baie, Mauritius	10k	Hard	(France) Lou Brouleau	6–3, 6–4
Win	3–0	Jun 2015	ITF Grand Baie, Mauritius	10k	Hard	(United States) Jaeda Daniel	7–5, 6–2
Win	4–0	Jul 2015	ITF La Possession, France	10k	Hard	(South Africa) Ilze Hattingh	6–2, 6–3
Loss	4–1	Aug 2015	ITF Pörtschach, Austria	10k	Clay	(Austria) Julia Grabher	6–7^{(5–7)}, 1–6
Loss	4–2	Jan 2016	ITF Fort-de-France, France	10k	Hard	(France) Irina Ramialison	6–7^{(3–7)}, 2–6
Win	5–2	Jan 2016	ITF Petit-Bourg, France	10k	Hard	(France) Théo Gravouil	6–4, 6–1
Win	6–2	Feb 2016	Morelos Open, Mexico	25k	Hard	(United States) Lauren Albanese	0–6, 6–0, 6–1
Win	7–2	May 2016	ITF Monzón, Spain	10k	Hard	(France) Jessika Ponchet	6–4, 6–4
Win	8–2	Jun 2016	ITF Puszczykowo, Poland	10k	Hard	(Russia) Valeria Savinykh	6–2, 6–0
Win	9–2	Feb 2017	ITF Perth, Australia	25k	Hard	(Czech Republic) Markéta Vondroušová	1–6, 6–3, 6–2
Win	10–2	Mar 2017	ITF Orlando, United States	15k	Clay	(Mexico) Victoria Rodríguez	7–5, 5–7, 6–0
Loss	10–3	May 2017	ITF Monzón, Spain	25k	Hard	(Spain) Georgina García Pérez	1–6, 3–6
Loss	10–4	Sep 2017	ITF Stillwater, United States	25k	Hard	(Canada) Aleksandra Wozniak	5–7, 4–6
Win	11–4	Mar 2018	ITF Irapuato, Mexico	25k	Hard	(Slovakia) Kristína Kučová	6–4, 6–0
Win	12–4	Jul 2019	President's Cup, Kazakhstan	W80	Hard	(Serbia) Natalija Kostić	6–3, 6–3

=== Doubles: 3 (3 titles) ===
Legend W80 tournaments (1–0) W60 tournaments (1–0) 10k tournaments (1–0)	Finals by surface Hard (3–0)

Result	W–L	Date	Tournament	Tier	Surface	Partner	Opponents	Score
Win	1–0	Jun 2015	ITF Grand Baie, Mauritius	10k	Hard	(Netherlands) Rosalie van der Hoek	(South Africa) Ilze Hattingh (South Africa) Madrie Le Roux	6–3, 7–5
Win	2–0	Apr 2019	Lale Cup Istanbul, Turkey	W60	Hard	(Netherlands) Rosalie van der Hoek	(Belarus) Ilona Kremen (Belarus) Iryna Shymanovich	7–5, 6–7^{(2–7)}, [10–5]
Win	3–0	Jul 2019	President's Cup, Kazakhstan	W80	Hard	(Germany) Vivian Heisen	(Russia) Vlada Koval (Russia) Kamilla Rakhimova	7–6^{(10–8)}, 6–1

== ITF Junior Circuit ==
=== Junior Grand Slam finals ===
==== Singles: 1 (title) ====
Result	Year	Tournament	Surface	Opponent	Score
Win	2014	US Open	Hard	(Ukraine) Anhelina Kalinina	6–4, 7–6^{(7–5)}

==== Doubles: 1 (runner-up) ====
Result	Year	Tournament	Surface	Partner	Opponents	Score
Loss	2014	Wimbledon	Grass	(Hungary) Dalma Gálfi	(Indonesia) Tami Grende (China) Ye Qiuyu	2–6, 6–7^{(5–7)}

=== ITF Junior Circuit finals ===
==== Singles: 11 (7 titles, 4 runner-ups) ====
Legend
Grade A (1–0)
Grade 1/B1 (1–1)
Grade 2 (1–1)
Grade 3 (0–1)
Grade 4 (3–1)
Grade 5 (1–0)

Result	W–L	Date	Tournament	Tier	Surface	Opponent	Score
Win	1–0	Mar 2012	ITF Guatemala City, Guatemala	Grade 4	Hard	(Belgium) Britt Geukens	6–1, 6–2
Win	2–0	Mar 2012	ITF Doha, Qatar	Grade 5	Hard	(United Kingdom) Dominique Covington	6–2, 6–7^{(5–7)}, 6–1
Loss	2–1	Jul 2012	ITF Prague, Czech Republic	Grade 4	Clay	(Czech Republic) Vendula Žovincová	7–5, 1–6, 2–6
Loss	2–2	Sep 2012	ITF Nicosia, Cyprus	Grade 3	Hard	(Switzerland) Chiara Grimm	6–4, 2–2 ret.
Win	3–2	Feb 2013	ITF La Libertad, El Salvador	Grade 4	Hard	(El Salvador) Jennifer Paola Artiga Henriquez	6–1, 6–1
Win	4–2	Mar 2013	ITF Llanos de Curundú, Panama	Grade 4	Clay	(United States) Mary Catherine Haffey	6–2, 6–4
Loss	4–3	Apr 2013	ITF Alicante, Spain	Grade 2	Hard	(United Kingdom) Katie Boulter	1–6, 3–6
Win	5–3	May 2013	ITF Casablanca, Morocco	Grade 1	Clay	(United States) Johnnise Renaud	6–1, 6–4
Loss	5–4	Jan 2014	ITF San José, Costa Rica	Grade 1	Hard	(United States) CiCi Bellis	4–6, 3–6
Win	6–4	Jun 2014	ITF Bochum, Germany	Grade 2	Clay	(Germany) Katharina Hobgarski	6–4, 6–1
Win	7–4	Sep 2014	US Open, United States	Grade A	Hard	(Ukraine) Anhelina Kalinina	6–4, 7–6^{(7–5)}

==== Doubles: 6 (1 title, 5 runner-ups) ====
Legend
Grade A (0–1)
Grade 1/B1 (0–1)
Grade 2 (0–1)
Grade 3 (0–0)
Grade 4 (1–2)
Grade 5 (0–0)

Result	W–L	Date	Tournament	Tier	Surface	Partner	Opponents	Score
Loss	0–1	Jul 2012	ITF Prague, Czech Republic	Grade 4	Clay	(Belgium) Magali Kempen	(Czech Republic) Miriam Kolodziejová (Czech Republic) Vendula Žovincová	w/o
Loss	0–2	Feb 2013	ITF La Libertad, El Salvador	Grade 4	Hard	(India) Lalita Devarakonda	(United States) Meghan Kelley (United States) Claudia Wiktorin	1–6, 1–6
Win	1–2	Mar 2013	ITF Llanos de Curundú, Panama	Grade 4	Clay	(United States) Claudia Wiktorin	(Guatemala) Camila Ramazzini (United States) Alexandra Valenstein	6–3, 6–2
Loss	1–3	Apr 2013	ITF Alicante, Spain	Grade 2	Hard	(United States) Anastasia Nefedova	(Switzerland) Chiara Grimm (Switzerland) Jil Teichmann	3–6, 6–7^{(2–7)}
Loss	1–4	May 2013	ITF Casablanca, Morocco	Grade 1	Clay	(Australia) Sara Tomic	(Belgium) Britt Geukens (Russia) Anna Iakovleva	2–6, 6–3, [8–10]
Loss	1–5	Jul 2014	Wimbledon Championships, United Kingdom	Grade A	Grass	(Hungary) Dalma Gálfi	(Indonesia) Tami Grende (China) Ye Qiuyu	2–6, 6–7^{(5–7)}

== WTA Tour career earnings ==
Current through the 2023 Canadian Open.

Year	Grand Slam titles	WTA titles	Total titles	Earnings ($)	Money list rank
2014	0	0	0	5,189	690
2015	0	0	0	13,525	429
2016	0	0	0	17,956	391
2017	0	0	0	48,439	272
2018	0	0	0	136,948	188
2019	0	0	0	455,867	96
2020	0	0	0	310,417	79
2021	0	2	2	587,764	59
2022	0	2	2	1,262,682	27
2023	0	0	0	947,449	27
Career	0	4	4	3,796,320	180

- Title counts include singles, doubles and mixed doubles titles.

== Career Grand Slam statistics ==
=== Best singles results details ===
Grand Slam winners are in boldface, and runner–ups are in italics.

Australian Open
2022 Australian Open (unseeded)
Round	Opponent	Rank	Score
1R	(Canada) Rebecca Marino (Q)	143	6–1, 6–3
2R	(Estonia) Kaia Kanepi	115	2–6, 6–7^{(3–7)}
2026 Australian Open (unseeded)
1R	(Mexico) Renata Zarazúa	80	6–2, 7–5
2R	**(Poland) Iga Świątek (2)**	2	2–6, 3–6

Wimbledon Championships
2022 Wimbledon Championships (unseeded)
Round	Opponent	Rank	Score
1R	(United States) Danielle Collins (7)	8	5–7, 6–4, 6–4
2R	(United States) Ann Li	67	6–0, 6–3
3R	(United States) Alison Riske (28)	36	6–2, 6–3
4R	(France) Caroline Garcia	55	7–5, 6–2
QF	(Tunisia) Ons Jabeur (3)	2	6–3, 1–6, 1–6

French Open
2024 French Open (unseeded)
Round	Opponent	Rank	Score
1R	Veronika Kudermetova (29)	31	6–2, 6–4
2R	(Croatia) Jana Fett (LL)	135	6–2, 6–2
3R	**(Poland) Iga Świątek (1)**	1	4–6, 2–6
2025 French Open (unseeded)
1R	Anna Kalinskaya (30)	28	6–4, 7–5
2R	(United Kingdom) Sonay Kartal	56	6–1, 6–4
3R	**(United States) Coco Gauff (2)**	2	1–6, 6–7^{(3–7)}
2026 French Open (27th)
1R	(Italy) Lucia Bronzetti (Q)	172	6–3, 6–1
2R	(United Kingdom) Francesca Jones	102	6–0, 7–6^{(7–3)}
3R	**Mirra Andreeva (8)**	8	4–6, 2–6

US Open
2023 US Open (31st)
Round	Opponent	Rank	Score
1R	(United States) Ashlyn Krueger (WC)	120	7–5, 6–4
2R	(Croatia) Petra Martić	37	6–1, 6–2
3R	(Tunisia) Ons Jabeur (5)	5	7–5, 6–7^{(5–7)}, 3–6

=== Seedings ===
==== Singles ====
Year	Australian Open	French Open	Wimbledon	US Open
2017	absent	absent	did not qualify	did not qualify
2018	did not qualify	did not qualify	did not qualify	qualifier
2019	did not qualify	lucky loser	lucky loser	unseeded
2020	unseeded	unseeded	cancelled	unseeded
2021	unseeded	unseeded	unseeded	unseeded
2022	unseeded	unseeded	unseeded	unseeded
2023	25th	31st	32nd	31st
2024	31st	unseeded	unseeded	unseeded
2025	unseeded	unseeded	unseeded	unseeded
2026	unseeded	27th	21st	

==== Doubles ====
Year	Australian Open	French Open	Wimbledon	US Open
2020	unseeded	unseeded	cancelled	absent
2021	unseeded	unseeded	16th	15th
2022	10th	absent	16th	absent
2023	unseeded	protected ranking	unseeded	absent
2024	12th	7th	10th	11th
2025	14th	absent	unseeded	absent
2026	protected ranking	protected ranking	protected ranking	

== Wins over top-10 players ==
- Bouzková has a 11–14 (44%) record against players who were, at the time the match was played, ranked in the top 10.

No.	Player	Rk	Event	Surface	Rd	Score	Rk	Years	Ref
1	(United States) Sloane Stephens	8	Canadian Open, Canada	Hard	2R	6–2, 7–5	91	2019	
2	(Romania) Simona Halep	4	Canadian Open, Canada	Hard	QF	6–4, ret.	91	2019	
3	(Ukraine) Elina Svitolina	3	Guangzhou International, China	Hard	2R	6–4, 4–3 ret.	63	2019	
4	(Canada) Bianca Andreescu	9	Phillip Island Trophy, Australia	Hard	SF	6–7^{(9–11)}, 6–2, 7–5	50	2021	
5	(Czech Republic) Karolína Plíšková	7	Madrid Open, Spain	Clay	1R	6–4, 7–5	77	2022	
6	(United States) Danielle Collins	8	Wimbledon Championships, UK	Grass	1R	5–7, 6–4, 6–4	66	2022	
7	(United States) Coco Gauff	5	Italian Open, Italy	Clay	3R	4–6, 6–2, 6–2	38	2023	
8	(France) Caroline Garcia	5	Wimbledon Championships, UK	Grass	3R	7–6^{(7–0)}, 4–6, 7–5	33	2023	
9	(France) Caroline Garcia	6	Canadian Open, Canada	Hard	2R	6–4, 4–6, 6–2	37	2023	
10	(United States) Jessica Pegula	3	Cincinnati Open, US	Hard	3R	6–4, 6–0	35	2023	
11	Aryna Sabalenka	3	Washington Open, US	Hard	SF	6–4, 3–6, 6–3	43	2024	

- Key: (Rk) first use, opponent rank; (Rd) round; (Rk) 2nd use, player rank; (Ref) reference; (F) final; (SF) semifinal; (QF) quarterfinal; (#R) rounds 4, 3, 2, 1; (RR) round-robin stage; (Q#) qualifying rounds or stages (3), 2, 1.
