= 2021 President's Cup – Women's doubles =

Women's doubles
- 2021 President's Cup

Final
- Champions: (Russia) Alina Charaeva (Russia) Maria Timofeeva
- Runners-up: (Russia) Evgeniya Levashova (Brazil) Laura Pigossi
- Score: 7–6^{(7–5)}, 2–6, [10–6]

Events
Singles	men	women
Doubles	men	women
- President's Cup

Marie Bouzková and Vivian Heisen were the defending champions, having won the previous edition in 2019, however both players chose not to participate.

Alina Charaeva and Maria Timofeeva won the title, defeating Evgeniya Levashova and Laura Pigossi in the final, 7–6^{(7–5)}, 2–6, [10–6].

== Seeds ==
1. (Lithuania) Justina Mikulskytė / (Russia) Ekaterina Yashina (first round)
2. (Belarus) Yuliya Hatouka / (Russia) Sofya Lansere (quarterfinals)
3. (Belarus) Iryna Shymanovich / (Belarus) Shalimar Talbi (first round)
4. (Uzbekistan) Nigina Abduraimova / (Russia) Angelina Gabueva (first round)

== Draw ==
Key

- Q = Qualifier
- WC = Wild card
- LL = Lucky loser
- Alt = Alternate
- ITF = ITF entry
- PR = Protected ranking
- SR = Special ranking
- SE = Special exempt
- JE = Junior exempt
- JR = Junior Accelerator Programme entrant
- CO = College Accelerator Programme entrant
- NG = Next Gen Accelerator Program entrant
- w/o = Walkover
- r = Retired
- d = Defaulted

=== Draw ===
First round
1	(Lithuania) J Mikulskytė (Russia) E Yashina	6	4	[7]
WC	(Kazakhstan) Y Dmitrichenko (Ukraine) M Zakarlyuk	0	6	[10]
(Slovakia) V Morvayová (Czech Republic) A Sisková	5	3
(Russia) E Levashova (Brazil) L Pigossi	7	6
4	(Uzbekistan) N Abduraimova (Russia) A Gabueva	2	2
WC	(Israel) L Glushko (Kazakhstan) Z Kulambayeva	6	6
(Russia) V Savinykh (Russia) A Sukhotina	6^{1}	1
(Turkey) B Cengiz (Russia) A Tikhonova	7^{7}	6
(Russia) E Kazionova (Uzbekistan) S Sharipova	6	5	[6]
(Russia) A Charaeva (Russia) M Timofeeva	1	7	[10]
(Kazakhstan) G Ainitdinova (Belarus) A Kubareva	6	3	[10]
3	(Belarus) I Shymanovich (Belarus) S Talbi	4	6	[5]
(Georgia (country)) M Bolkvadze (Sweden) J Cabaj Awad	6	6
WC	(Kazakhstan) S Chursina (Kazakhstan) T Nikolenko	3	1
(Thailand) P Plipuech (Russia) V Yushchenko
2	(Belarus) Y Hatouka (Russia) S Lansere	w/o

Quarterfinals
WC	(Kazakhstan) Y Dmitrichenko (Ukraine) M Zakarlyuk	5	4
(Russia) E Levashova (Brazil) L Pigossi	7	6
WC	(Israel) L Glushko (Kazakhstan) Z Kulambayeva	6	2	[10]
(Turkey) B Cengiz (Russia) A Tikhonova	4	6	[5]
(Russia) A Charaeva (Russia) M Timofeeva	7	0	[10]
(Kazakhstan) G Ainitdinova (Belarus) A Kubareva	5	6	[4]
(Georgia (country)) M Bolkvadze (Sweden) J Cabaj Awad	7^{7}	6^{3}	[10]
2	(Belarus) Y Hatouka (Russia) S Lansere	6^{3}	7^{7}	[6]

Semifinals
(Russia) E Levashova (Brazil) L Pigossi	6	6
WC	(Israel) L Glushko (Kazakhstan) Z Kulambayeva	4	4
(Russia) A Charaeva (Russia) M Timofeeva	w/o
(Georgia (country)) M Bolkvadze (Sweden) J Cabaj Awad

Final
(Russia) E Levashova (Brazil) L Pigossi	6^{5}	6	[6]
(Russia) A Charaeva (Russia) M Timofeeva	7^{7}	2	[10]
