= 2021 President's Cup (tennis) =

Tennis tournament

- Date: 12–18 July 2021
- Edition: 15th (men); 12th (women)
- Category: ATP Challenger Tour; ITF Women's World Tennis Tour
- Prize money: $52,080 (men) $60,000 (women)
- Surface: Hard
- Location: Nur-Sultan, Kazakhstan

Champions

Men's singles
- (Australia) Max Purcell

Women's singles
- (Georgia (country)) Mariam Bolkvadze

Men's doubles
- (Chinese Taipei) Hsu Yu-hsiou / (Zimbabwe) Benjamin Lock

Women's doubles
- (Russia) Alina Charaeva / (Russia) Maria Timofeeva
← 2019 ·	President's Cup	· 2021 →

The 2021 President's Cup was a professional tennis tournament played on outdoor hard courts. It was the fifteenth and twelfth editions of the tournament which were part of the 2021 ATP Challenger Tour and the 2021 ITF Women's World Tennis Tour. It took place in Nur-Sultan, Kazakhstan between 12 and 18 July 2021.

== Men's singles main-draw entrants ==
=== Seeds ===
Country	Player	Rank^{1}	Seed
RUS	Roman Safiullin	157	1
UZB	Denis Istomin	188	2
GBR	Jay Clarke	230	3
AUS	Max Purcell	237	4
CRO	Borna Gojo	238	5
UKR	Sergiy Stakhovsky	242	6
CAN	Peter Polansky	251	7
FRA	Hugo Grenier	256	8

- ^{1} Rankings are as of 28 June 2021.

=== Other entrants ===
The following players received wildcards into the singles main draw:

- (Kazakhstan) Grigoriy Lomakin
- (Kazakhstan) Dostanbek Tashbulatov
- (Kazakhstan) Beibit Zhukayev

The following players received entry from the qualifying draw:

- (Russia) Yan Bondarevskiy
- (Russia) Artem Dubrivnyy
- (Ukraine) Oleksii Krutykh
- (Russia) Andrey Kuznetsov

== Women's singles main-draw entrants ==
=== Seeds ===
Country	Player	Rank^{1}	Seed
GEO	Mariam Bolkvadze	189	1
RUS	Valeria Savinykh	195	2
UKR	Daria Snigur	203	3
BLR	Yuliya Hatouka	260	4
BRA	Laura Pigossi	313	5
RUS	Sofya Lansere	314	6
THA	Peangtarn Plipuech	321	7
BLR	Anna Kubareva	333	8

- ^{1} Rankings are as of 28 June 2021.

=== Other entrants ===
The following players received wildcards into the singles main draw:

- (Kazakhstan) Gozal Ainitdinova
- (Kazakhstan) Yekaterina Dmitrichenko
- (Israel) Lina Glushko
- (Kazakhstan) Zhibek Kulambayeva

The following players received entry using protected rankings:

- (Japan) Hiroko Kuwata
- (Thailand) Peangtarn Plipuech
- (Uzbekistan) Sabina Sharipova
- (Russia) Valeriya Yushchenko

The following players received entry from the qualifying draw:

- (Uzbekistan) Nigina Abduraimova
- (Sweden) Jacqueline Cabaj Awad
- (Russia) Angelina Gabueva
- (Lithuania) Justina Mikulskytė
- (Slovakia) Viktória Morvayová
- (Russia) Ekaterina Shalimova
- (Czech Republic) Anna Sisková
- (Russia) Anastasia Tikhonova

== Champions ==
=== Men's singles ===
- (Australia) Max Purcell def. (United Kingdom) Jay Clarke 3–6, 6–4, 7–6^{(8–6)}.

=== Women's singles ===
- (Georgia (country)) Mariam Bolkvadze def. (Russia) Valeria Savinykh, 4–6, 6–3, 6–2

=== Men's doubles ===
- (Chinese Taipei) Hsu Yu-hsiou / (Zimbabwe) Benjamin Lock def. (Canada) Peter Polansky / (Ukraine) Sergiy Stakhovsky 2–6, 6–1, [10–7].

=== Women's doubles ===
- (Russia) Alina Charaeva / (Russia) Maria Timofeeva def. (Russia) Evgeniya Levashova / (Brazil) Laura Pigossi, 7–6^{(7–5)}, 2–6, [10–6]
