= 2019 President's Cup – Women's singles =

Women's singles
- 2019 President's Cup (tennis)

Final
- Champion: (Czech Republic) Marie Bouzková
- Runner-up: (Serbia) Natalija Kostić
- Score: 6–3, 6–3

Events
Singles	men	women
Doubles	men	women
- President's Cup (tennis)

Ekaterine Gorgodze was the defending champion, but chose to participate at the 2019 Bucharest Open instead.

Marie Bouzková won the title, defeating Natalija Kostić in the final, 6–3, 6–3.

== Seeds ==
1. (Czech Republic) Marie Bouzková (champion)
2. (Russia) Valeria Savinykh (withdrew)
3. (Georgia (country)) Mariam Bolkvadze (semifinals, retired)
4. (Uzbekistan) Sabina Sharipova (second round)
5. (China) Wang Xinyu (quarterfinals)
6. (Turkey) Çağla Büyükakçay (quarterfinals)
7. (Serbia) Natalija Kostić (final)
8. (Russia) Anastasia Gasanova (first round)

== Draw ==
Key

- Q = Qualifier
- WC = Wild card
- LL = Lucky loser
- Alt = Alternate
- ITF = ITF entry
- PR = Protected ranking
- SR = Special ranking
- SE = Special exempt
- JE = Junior exempt
- JR = Junior Accelerator Programme entrant
- CO = College Accelerator Programme entrant
- NG = Next Gen Accelerator Program entrant
- w/o = Walkover
- r = Retired
- d = Defaulted

=== Finals ===
Semifinals
1	(Czech Republic) Marie Bouzková	6	6
Q	(Belarus) Iryna Shymanovich	0	0
3	(Georgia (country)) Mariam Bolkvadze	1	0^{r}
7	(Serbia) Natalija Kostić	6	1

Final
1	(Czech Republic) Marie Bouzková	6	6
7	(Serbia) Natalija Kostić	3	3

=== Top half ===
First round
1	(Czech Republic) M Bouzková	7	6
(Kazakhstan) A Danilina	5	2
(Russia) E Yashina	6	6^{6}	1
WC	(Kazakhstan) Z Kulambayeva	1	7^{8}	6
(Japan) K Okamura	6	6
Q	(Belarus) S Talbi	1	4
(Russia) K Rakhimova	6^{4}	7^{9}	3
6	(Turkey) Ç Büyükakçay	7^{7}	6^{7}	6
4	(Uzbekistan) S Sharipova	6	6
(Russia) P Monova	4	3
(Hungary) G Arn	6	3	1
Q	(Belarus) I Shymanovich	2	6	6
(Germany) V Heisen	6	6
(Japan) M Minokoshi	4	3
WC	(Kazakhstan) G Ainitdinova	7^{13}	7
8	(Russia) A Gasanova	6^{11}	5

Second round
1	(Czech Republic) M Bouzková	6	6
WC	(Kazakhstan) Z Kulambayeva	1	0
(Japan) K Okamura	4	3
6	(Turkey) Ç Büyükakçay	6	6
4	(Uzbekistan) S Sharipova	6	3	4
Q	(Belarus) I Shymanovich	2	6	6
(Germany) V Heisen	6	3	7
WC	(Kazakhstan) G Ainitdinova	2	6	5

Quarterfinals
1	(Czech Republic) M Bouzková	6	7^{7}
6	(Turkey) Ç Büyükakçay	3	6^{3}
Q	(Belarus) I Shymanovich	6	4	6
(Germany) V Heisen	4	6	4

Semifinals
1	(Czech Republic) M Bouzková	6	6
Q	(Belarus) I Shymanovich	0	0

=== Bottom half ===
First round
5	(China) Xin Wang	6	4	7^{7}
(Turkey) B Cengiz	4	6	6^{3}
(Uzbekistan) N Abduraimova	2	4
(Russia) O Doroshina	6	6
(Japan) A Omae	7^{7}	6
Q	(Russia) V Koval	6^{5}	4
Q	(Turkey) İ Öz	4	6	1
3	(Georgia (country)) M Bolkvadze	6	2	6
7	(Serbia) N Kostić	6	6
WC	(Kazakhstan) D Detkovskaya	1	4
Q	(Ukraine) M Zakarlyuk	2	7	3
Q	(Israel) V Ekshibarova	6	5	6
WC	(Kazakhstan) Y Dmitrichenko	3	2
Q	(Russia) A Zakharova	6	6
Q	(Kyrgyzstan) K Palkina	6	6
LL	(Hong Kong) K-y Ng	4	3

Second round
5	(China) Xin Wang	4	6	6
(Russia) O Doroshina	6	4	4
(Japan) A Omae	5	2
3	(Georgia (country)) M Bolkvadze	7	6
7	(Serbia) N Kostić	6	6
Q	(Israel) V Ekshibarova	3	4
Q	(Russia) A Zakharova	6	6
Q	(Kyrgyzstan) K Palkina	2	1

Quarterfinals
5	(China) Xin Wang	6^{8}	2
3	(Georgia (country)) M Bolkvadze	7^{10}	6
7	(Serbia) N Kostić	2	6	6
Q	(Russia) A Zakharova	6	4	3

Semifinals
3	(Georgia (country)) M Bolkvadze	1	0^{r}
7	(Serbia) N Kostić	6	1
