= 2019 President's Cup (tennis) =

Tennis tournament

- Date: 15–21 July
- Edition: 14th (ATP); 11th (ITF)
- Category: ATP Challenger Tour; ITF Women's Circuit
- Surface: Hard
- Location: Nur-Sultan, Kazakhstan

Champions

Men's singles
- (Russia) Evgeny Donskoy

Women's singles
- (Czech Republic) Marie Bouzková

Men's doubles
- (Kazakhstan) Andrey Golubev / (Kazakhstan) Aleksandr Nedovyesov

Women's doubles
- (Czech Republic) Marie Bouzková / (Germany) Vivian Heisen
- President's Cup (tennis)

The 2019 President's Cup was a professional tennis tournament played on outdoor hard courts. It was the fourteenth (ATP) and eleventh (ITF) editions of the tournament and was part of the 2019 ATP Challenger Tour and the 2019 ITF Women's World Tennis Tour. It took place in Nur-Sultan, Kazakhstan, on 15–21 July 2019.

== Men's singles main draw entrants ==
=== Seeds ===
Country	Player	Rank^{1}	Seed
RUS	Evgeny Donskoy	128	1
ITA	Lorenzo Giustino	132	2
AUT	Sebastian Ofner	140	3
BLR	Egor Gerasimov	167	4
KAZ	Aleksandr Nedovyesov	200	5
BIH	Mirza Bašić	208	6
AUT	Lucas Miedler	223	7
KOR	Chung Yun-seong	241	8
POR	Gonçalo Oliveira	257	9
ITA	Matteo Viola	259	10
AUT	Jurij Rodionov	271	11
RUS	Pavel Kotov	275	12
IND	Sasikumar Mukund	280	13
AUS	Aleksandar Vukic	293	14
KOR	Nam Ji-sung	298	15
CHN	Zhang Zhizhen	303	16

- ^{1} Rankings are as of 1 July 2019.

=== Other entrants ===
The following players received wildcards into the singles main draw:

- (Uzbekistan) Sergey Fomin
- (Kazakhstan) Andrey Golubev
- (Turkey) Marsel İlhan
- (Kazakhstan) Grigoriy Lomakin
- (Kazakhstan) Dostanbek Tashbulatov

The following player received entry into the singles main draw using a protected ranking:

- (Colombia) Nicolás Barrientos

The following player received entry into the singles main draw as an alternate:

- (Czech Republic) Michael Vrbenský

The following players received entry into the singles main draw using their ITF World Tennis Ranking:

- (Uzbekistan) Sanjar Fayziev
- (Russia) Konstantin Kravchuk
- (Spain) Nikolás Sánchez Izquierdo
- (Japan) Shuichi Sekiguchi
- (Russia) Evgenii Tiurnev

The following players received entry from the qualifying draw:

- (Ukraine) Vladyslav Manafov
- (Switzerland) Luca Margaroli

== Women's singles main draw entrants ==
=== Seeds ===
Country	Player	Rank^{1}	Seed
CZE	Marie Bouzková	115	1
~~RUS~~	~~Valeria Savinykh~~	~~189~~	~~2~~
GEO	Mariam Bolkvadze	222	3
UZB	Sabina Sharipova	223	4
CHN	Wang Xinyu	230	5
TUR	Çağla Büyükakçay	246	6
SRB	Natalija Kostić	253	7
RUS	Anastasia Gasanova	282	8

- ^{1} Rankings are as of 1 July 2019

=== Other entrants ===
The following players received wildcards into the singles main draw:

- (Kazakhstan) Gozal Ainitdinova
- (Kazakhstan) Dariya Detkovskaya
- (Kazakhstan) Yekaterina Dmitrichenko
- (Kazakhstan) Zhibek Kulambayeva

The following players received entry from the qualifying draw:

- (Israel) Vlada Ekshibarova
- (Russia) Vlada Koval
- (Turkey) İpek Öz
- (Kyrgyzstan) Ksenia Palkina
- (Belarus) Iryna Shymanovich
- (Belarus) Shalimar Talbi
- (Ukraine) Marianna Zakarlyuk
- (Russia) Anastasia Zakharova

The following player received entry as a lucky loser:

- (Hong Kong) Ng Kwan-yau

== Champions ==
=== Men's singles ===
- (Russia) Evgeny Donskoy def. (United States) Sebastian Korda, 7–6^{(7–5)}, 3–6, 6–4

=== Women's singles ===
- (Czech Republic) Marie Bouzková def. (Serbia) Natalija Kostić, 6–3, 6–3

=== Men's doubles ===
- (Kazakhstan) Andrey Golubev / (Kazakhstan) Aleksandr Nedovyesov def. (South Korea) Chung Yun-seong / (South Korea) Nam Ji-sung 6–4, 6–4.

=== Women's doubles ===
- (Czech Republic) Marie Bouzková / (Germany) Vivian Heisen def. (Russia) Vlada Koval / (Russia) Kamilla Rakhimova, 7–6^{(10–8)}, 6–1
