= 2021 President's Cup – Men's doubles =

Men's doubles
- 2021 President's Cup

Final
- Champions: (Chinese Taipei) Hsu Yu-hsiou (Zimbabwe) Benjamin Lock
- Runners-up: (Canada) Peter Polansky (Ukraine) Sergiy Stakhovsky
- Score: 2–6, 6–1, [10–7]

Events
Singles	men	women
Doubles	men	women
← 2019 ·	President's Cup	· 2021 →

Andrey Golubev and Aleksandr Nedovyesov were the defending champions but chose not to defend their title.

Hsu Yu-hsiou and Benjamin Lock won the title after defeating Peter Polansky and Sergiy Stakhovsky 2–6, 6–1, [10–7] in the final.

== Seeds ==
1. (Canada) Peter Polansky / (Ukraine) Sergiy Stakhovsky (final)
2. (Australia) Max Purcell / (Australia) Akira Santillan (first round)
3. (Russia) Pavel Kotov / (Ukraine) Vladyslav Manafov (quarterfinals)
4. (Chinese Taipei) Hsu Yu-hsiou / (Zimbabwe) Benjamin Lock (champions)

== Draw ==
=== Key ===
- Q = Qualifier
- WC = Wild card
- LL = Lucky loser
- Alt = Alternate
- SE = Special exempt
- PR = Protected ranking
- ITF = ITF entry
- JE = Junior exempt
- w/o = Walkover
- r = Retired
- d = Defaulted
- SR = Special ranking

First round
1	(Canada) P Polansky (Ukraine) S Stakhovsky	6	3	[10]
WC	(Russia) A Dubrivnyy (Kazakhstan) G Lomakin	4	6	[6]
(South Korea) Y-s Chung (Uzbekistan) K Sultanov	6	7
(Australia) J Kubler (Israel) E Leshem	3	5
3	(Russia) P Kotov (Ukraine) V Manafov	6	6
WC	(Russia) D Golubev (Russia) A Zakharov	4	2
(Russia) E Karlovskiy (Kazakhstan) D Yevseyev	6	3	[5]
(Italy) A Bega (France) C Denolly	3	6	[10]
WC	(Kazakhstan) T Khabibulin (Kazakhstan) Dostanbek Tashbulatov	0	3
(Russia) A Kuznetsov (Russia) R Safiullin	6	6
(United Kingdom) J Clarke (Turkey) E Kırkın	2	2
4	(Chinese Taipei) Y-h Hsu (Zimbabwe) B Lock	6	6
(Bosnia and Herzegovina) M Bašić (Tunisia) M Jaziri	7^{7}	4	[11]
(United States) N Chappell (United Kingdom) R Peniston	6^{4}	6	[13]
(Monaco) L Catarina (France) H Grenier	6^{10}	6	[10]
2	(Australia) M Purcell (Australia) A Santillan	7^{12}	4	[4]

Quarterfinals
1	(Canada) P Polansky (Ukraine) S Stakhovsky	6	6
(South Korea) Y-s Chung (Uzbekistan) K Sultanov	2	3
3	(Russia) P Kotov (Ukraine) V Manafov	6^{6}	2
(Italy) A Bega (France) C Denolly	7^{8}	6
(Russia) A Kuznetsov (Russia) R Safiullin	7^{7}	4	[7]
4	(Chinese Taipei) Y-h Hsu (Zimbabwe) B Lock	6^{5}	6	[10]
(United States) N Chappell (United Kingdom) R Peniston	3	6	[5]
(Monaco) L Catarina (France) H Grenier	6	4	[10]

Semifinals
1	(Canada) P Polansky (Ukraine) S Stakhovsky	3	6	[10]
(Italy) A Bega (France) C Denolly	6	4	[8]
4	(Chinese Taipei) Y-h Hsu (Zimbabwe) B Lock	6	7^{7}
(Monaco) L Catarina (France) H Grenier	0	6^{2}

Final
1	(Canada) P Polansky (Ukraine) S Stakhovsky	6	1	[7]
4	(Chinese Taipei) Y-h Hsu (Zimbabwe) B Lock	2	6	[10]
