= 2023 Firenze Ladies Open – Singles =

Tennis tournament

Singles
- 2023 Firenze Ladies Open

Final
- Champion: (Italy) Jasmine Paolini
- Runner-up: (United States) Taylor Townsend
- Score: 6–3, 7–5

Details
- Draw: 32 (4 WC)
- Seeds: 8

Events
Singles	Doubles
Firenze Ladies Open	· 2024 →

This was the first edition of the tournament.

Jasmine Paolini won the title, defeating Taylor Townsend in the final, 6–3, 7–5.

== Seeds ==
1. (United States) Lauren Davis (withdrew)
2. (United States) Claire Liu (first round)
3. (Romania) Ana Bogdan (second round)
4. (Italy) Jasmine Paolini (champion)
5. (Germany) Jule Niemeier (first round)
6. (Italy) Sara Errani (semifinals)
7. (Slovakia) Anna Karolína Schmiedlová (first round)
8. (Italy) Lucia Bronzetti (semifinals)
9. (Italy) Lucrezia Stefanini (first round)

== Draw ==
=== Key ===
- Q = Qualifier
- WC = Wild card
- LL = Lucky loser
- Alt = Alternate
- SE = Special exempt
- PR = Protected ranking
- ITF = ITF entry
- JE = Junior exempt
- w/o = Walkover
- r = Retired
- d = Defaulted
- SR = Special ranking

=== Finals ===
Semifinals
8	(Italy) Lucia Bronzetti	6^{11}	6	2
4	(Italy) Jasmine Paolini	7^{13}	2	6
(United States) Taylor Townsend	4	7	7
6	(Italy) Sara Errani	6	5	5

Final
4	(Italy) Jasmine Paolini	6	7
(United States) Taylor Townsend	3	5

=== Top half ===
First round
9	(Italy) L Stefanini	4	2
(Australia) P Hon	6	6
Q	(Switzerland) C Naef	4	7^{8}	6
(United States) K Scott	6	6^{6}	2
Q	(Slovenia) D Jakupović	6	6
(Mexico) F Contreras	3	1
(Australia) O Gadecki	6	3	0
8	(Italy) L Bronzetti	3	6	6
4	(Italy) J Paolini	6	4	7^{9}
(United Kingdom) K Swan	4	6	6^{7}
WC	(Italy) C Rosatello	3	5
(Ukraine) D Yastremska	6	7
LL	(United States) A Muhammad	1	4
(Belgium) M Kempen	6	6
(Switzerland) Y In-Albon	7^{13}	6
7	(Slovakia) AK Schmiedlová	6^{11}	3

Second round
(Australia) P Hon	7	6
Q	(Switzerland) C Naef	5	3
Q	(Slovenia) D Jakupović	6^{1}	3
8	(Italy) L Bronzetti	7^{7}	6
4	(Italy) J Paolini	7	4	6
(Ukraine) D Yastremska	5	6	3
(Belgium) M Kempen	7^{7}	3	1
(Switzerland) Y In-Albon	6^{4}	6	6

Quarterfinals
(Australia) P Hon	5	3
8	(Italy) L Bronzetti	7	6
4	(Italy) J Paolini	4	6	6
(Switzerland) Y In-Albon	6	4	4

Semifinals
8	(Italy) L Bronzetti	6^{11}	6	2
4	(Italy) J Paolini	7^{13}	2	6

=== Bottom half ===
First round
5	(Germany) J Niemeier	3	6	3
WC	(Italy) M Paoletti	6	3	6
(United Kingdom) H Watson	3	2
(Italy) N Brancaccio	6	6
(United States) T Townsend	5
(Croatia) A Konjuh	2^{r}
Q	(Italy) D Chiesa	2	1
3	(Romania) A Bogdan	6	6
6	(Italy) S Errani	7	6
WC	(Italy) L Pigato	5	0
Q	(India) A Raina	7	4	6
E Avanesyan	5	6	1
WC	(Italy) D Cherubini	4	4
(Canada) E Bouchard	6	6
(Slovenia) K Juvan	6	5	6
2	(United States) C Liu	0	7	4

Second round
WC	(Italy) M Paoletti	2	7^{7}	6
(Italy) N Brancaccio	6	6^{2}	4
(United States) T Townsend	6	6
3	(Romania) A Bogdan	0	4
6	(Italy) S Errani	3	6	6
Q	(India) A Raina	6	3	3
(Canada) E Bouchard	7^{8}	6
(Slovenia) K Juvan	6^{6}	3

Quarterfinals
WC	(Italy) M Paoletti	3	2
(United States) T Townsend	6	6
6	(Italy) S Errani	6	1
(Canada) E Bouchard	3	0^{r}

Semifinals
(United States) T Townsend	4	7	7
6	(Italy) S Errani	6	5	5

== Qualifying ==
=== Seeds ===
1. (Slovenia) Dalila Jakupović (qualified)
2. (Switzerland) Céline Naef (qualified)
3. (India) Ankita Raina (qualified)
4. (Burundi) Sada Nahimana (first round)
5. (United States) Asia Muhammad (qualifying competition, lucky loser)
6. (Switzerland) Susan Bandecchi (qualifying competition)
7. (Italy) Angelica Moratelli (withdrew, still competing in Rome)
8. (Italy) Deborah Chiesa (qualified)

=== Qualifiers ===
1. (Slovenia) Dalila Jakupović
2. (Switzerland) Céline Naef
3. (India) Ankita Raina
4. (Italy) Deborah Chiesa

=== Lucky loser ===
1. (United States) Asia Muhammad

=== Draw ===
==== First qualifier ====
First round
1	(Slovenia) Dalila Jakupović	6	6
(Australia) Olivia Tjandramulia	0	1
(United States) Amy Zhu	0	2
5	(United States) Asia Muhammad	6	6

Qualifying competition
1	(Slovenia) Dalila Jakupović	7^{7}	0	7^{8}
5	(United States) Asia Muhammad	6^{3}	6	6^{6}

==== Second qualifier ====
First round				Qualifying competition
2	(Switzerland) Céline Naef	6	6
	(Italy) Federica Urgesi	4	4
	(Italy) Federica Urgesi	4	4	2	(Switzerland) Céline Naef	6	6
					(New Zealand) Erin Routliffe	4	1

==== Third qualifier ====
First round				Qualifying competition
				3	(India) Ankita Raina	7^{7}	6
				6	(Switzerland) Susan Bandecchi	6^{3}	2
	(Colombia) Yuliana Lizarazo	5	4	6	(Switzerland) Susan Bandecchi	6^{3}	2
6	(Switzerland) Susan Bandecchi	7	6

==== Fourth qualifier ====
First round
4	(Burundi) Sada Nahimana	4	1
(Italy) Beatrice Ricci	6	6
WC	(Estonia) Ingrid Neel	3	4
8	(Italy) Deborah Chiesa	6	6

Qualifying competition
(Italy) Beatrice Ricci	3	1
8	(Italy) Deborah Chiesa	6	6
