= 2021 President's Cup – Men's singles =

Men's singles
- 2021 President's Cup

Final
- Champion: (Australia) Max Purcell
- Runner-up: (United Kingdom) Jay Clarke
- Score: 3–6, 6–4, 7–6^{(8–6)}

Events
| Singles | men | women |
| Doubles | men | women |
| ← 2019 · | President's Cup | · 2021 → |

Evgeny Donskoy was the defending champion but chose not to defend his title.

Max Purcell won the title after defeating Jay Clarke 3–6, 6–4, 7–6^{(8–6)} in the final.

== Seeds ==
1. (Russia) Roman Safiullin (quarterfinals)
2. (Uzbekistan) Denis Istomin (first round)
3. (United Kingdom) Jay Clarke (final)
4. (Australia) Max Purcell (champion)
5. (Croatia) Borna Gojo (semifinals)
6. (Ukraine) Sergiy Stakhovsky (second round)
7. (Canada) Peter Polansky (semifinals)
8. (France) Hugo Grenier (first round)

== Draw ==
=== Key ===
- Q = Qualifier
- WC = Wild card
- LL = Lucky loser
- Alt = Alternate
- SE = Special exempt
- PR = Protected ranking
- ITF = ITF entry
- JE = Junior exempt
- w/o = Walkover
- r = Retired
- d = Defaulted
- SR = Special ranking

=== Finals ===
Semifinals
7 | (Canada) Peter Polansky | 5 | 6 | 6^{3}
4 | (Australia) Max Purcell | 7 | 3 | 7^{7}
3 | (United Kingdom) Jay Clarke | 6 | 6
5 | (Croatia) Borna Gojo | 4 | 4

Final
4 | (Australia) Max Purcell | 3 | 6 | 7^{8}
3 | (United Kingdom) Jay Clarke | 6 | 4 | 6^{6}

=== Top half ===
First round
1 | (Russia) R Safiullin | 6 | 6
(Tunisia) M Jaziri | 4 | 2
(South Korea) Y-s Chung | 6 | 6
Q | (Russia) Yan Bondarevskiy | 3 | 4
(Australia) A Santillan | 4 | 3
Q | (Russia) A Kuznetsov | 6 | 6
WC | (Kazakhstan) G Lomakin | 4 | 6^{4}
7 | (Canada) P Polansky | 6 | 7^{7}
4 | (Australia) M Purcell | 2 | 6 | 7
(Italy) A Bega | 6 | 2 | 5
Q | (Ukraine) O Krutykh | 3 | 4
(Chinese Taipei) T-l Wu | 6 | 6
(Monaco) L Catarina | 4 | 2
(Russia) E Karlovskiy | 6 | 6
(Chinese Taipei) Y-h Hsu | 6 | 6
8 | (France) H Grenier | 4 | 2

Second round
1 | (Russia) R Safiullin | 6 | 6
(South Korea) Y-s Chung | 3 | 4
Q | (Russia) A Kuznetsov | 4 | 3
7 | (Canada) P Polansky | 6 | 6
4 | (Australia) M Purcell | 3 | 7^{7} | 6
(Chinese Taipei) T-l Wu | 6 | 6^{4} | 2
(Russia) E Karlovskiy | 3 | 0
(Chinese Taipei) Y-h Hsu | 6 | 6

Quarterfinals
1 | (Russia) R Safiullin | 2 | 6 | 6^{4}
7 | (Canada) P Polansky | 6 | 1 | 7^{7}
4 | (Australia) M Purcell | 6 | 6
(Chinese Taipei) Y-h Hsu | 2 | 1

Semifinals
7 | (Canada) P Polansky | 5 | 6 | 6^{3}
4 | (Australia) M Purcell | 7 | 3 | 7^{7}

=== Bottom half ===
First round
6 | (Ukraine) S Stakhovsky | 7 | 6
(Russia) P Kotov | 5 | 2
(Australia) J Kubler | 6 | 6
WC | (Kazakhstan) Dostanbek Tashbulatov | 1 | 3
WC | (Kazakhstan) B Zhukayev | 4 | 6 | 7^{8}
(United States) N Chappell | 6 | 3 | 6^{6}
Q | (Russia) A Dubrivnyy | 5 | 6^{3}
3 | (United Kingdom) J Clarke | 7 | 7^{7}
5 | (Croatia) B Gojo | 7^{7} | 6
(Uzbekistan) K Sultanov | 6^{3} | 1
(France) C Denolly | 2 | 6 | 3
(Chinese Taipei) C-h Tseng | 6 | 3 | 6
(Bosnia and Herzegovina) M Bašić | 6 | 6
(Kazakhstan) D Yevseyev | 3 | 3
(United Kingdom) R Peniston | 6 | 3 | 6
2 | (Uzbekistan) D Istomin | 1 | 6 | 3

Second round
6 | (Ukraine) S Stakhovsky | 2 | 6 | 2
(Australia) J Kubler | 6 | 3 | 6
WC | (Kazakhstan) B Zhukayev | 3 | 3
3 | (United Kingdom) J Clarke | 6 | 6
5 | (Croatia) B Gojo | 6 | 6
(Chinese Taipei) C-h Tseng | 1 | 2
(Bosnia and Herzegovina) M Bašić | 6 | 6
(United Kingdom) R Peniston | 3 | 1

Quarterfinals
(Australia) J Kubler | 6 | 5 | 6^{1}
3 | (United Kingdom) J Clarke | 3 | 7 | 7^{7}
5 | (Croatia) B Gojo | 2 | 7^{7} | 6
(Bosnia and Herzegovina) M Bašić | 6 | 6^{2} | 2

Semifinals
3 | (United Kingdom) J Clarke | 6 | 6
5 | (Croatia) B Gojo | 4 | 4
