= 2023 Firenze Ladies Open – Doubles =

Tennis tournament

Doubles
- 2023 Firenze Ladies Open

Final
- Champions: (Germany) Vivian Heisen (Estonia) Ingrid Neel
- Runners-up: (United States) Asia Muhammad (Mexico) Giuliana Olmos
- Score: 1–6, 6–2, [10–8]

Details
- Draw: 16
- Seeds: 4

Events
| Singles | Doubles |
| Firenze Ladies Open | · 2024 → |

This was the first edition of the tournament.

Vivian Heisen and Ingrid Neel won the title, defeating Asia Muhammad and Giuliana Olmos in the final, 1–6, 6–2, [10–8].

== Seeds ==
1. (United States) Asia Muhammad / (Mexico) Giuliana Olmos (final)
2. (Chile) Alexa Guarachi / (New Zealand) Erin Routliffe (first round)
3. (Czech Republic) Renata Voráčová / (Chinese Taipei) Wu Fang-hsien (semifinals)
4. (Germany) Vivian Heisen / (Estonia) Ingrid Neel (champions)

== Draw ==
=== Key ===
- Q = Qualifier
- WC = Wild card
- LL = Lucky loser
- Alt = Alternate
- SE = Special exempt
- PR = Protected ranking
- ITF = ITF entry
- JE = Junior exempt
- w/o = Walkover
- r = Retired
- d = Defaulted
- SR = Special ranking

=== Draw ===
First round
1 | (United States) A Muhammad (Mexico) G Olmos | 6 | 6
(Italy) D Cherubini (Italy) D Chiesa | 4 | 3
(Belgium) M Kempen (United Kingdom) E Webley-Smith | 4 | 3
A Gabueva (United Kingdom) H Watson | 6 | 6
3 | (Czech Republic) R Voráčová (Chinese Taipei) F-h Wu | 6^{5} | 7^{7} | [10]
(Slovenia) D Jakupović (Australia) O Tjandramulia | 7^{7} | 6^{5} | [5]
(Italy) A Moratelli (Italy) C Rosatello | 6 | 6
(United States) K Scott (United Kingdom) K Swan | 4 | 3
(France) E Cascino (India) A Raina | 1 | 7 | [7]
(Italy) M Paoletti (Italy) L Pigato | 6 | 5 | [10]
(Colombia) Y Lizarazo (Colombia) MP Pérez García | 6^{9} | 3
4 | (Germany) V Heisen (Estonia) I Neel | 7^{11} | 6
(Italy) S Errani (Italy) J Paolini | 6 | 6
(United Kingdom) F Christie (United Kingdom) A Collins | 0 | 4
(Mexico) F Contreras (United States) C Rosca | 6 | 6
2 | (Chile) A Guarachi (New Zealand) E Routliffe | 4 | 4

Quarterfinals
1 | (United States) A Muhammad (Mexico) G Olmos | 6 | 6
A Gabueva (United Kingdom) H Watson | 3 | 4
3 | (Czech Republic) R Voráčová (Chinese Taipei) F-h Wu | 4 | 6 | [10]
(Italy) A Moratelli (Italy) C Rosatello | 6 | 4 | [8]
(Italy) M Paoletti (Italy) L Pigato
4 | (Germany) V Heisen (Estonia) I Neel | w/o
(Italy) S Errani (Italy) J Paolini | 6 | 6
(Mexico) F Contreras (United States) C Rosca | 2 | 2

Semifinals
1 | (United States) A Muhammad (Mexico) G Olmos | 3 | 6 | [10]
3 | (Czech Republic) R Voráčová (Chinese Taipei) F-h Wu | 6 | 1 | [2]
4 | (Germany) V Heisen (Estonia) I Neel | 7^{8} | 4 | [10]
(Italy) S Errani (Italy) J Paolini | 6^{6} | 6 | [2]

Final
1 | (United States) A Muhammad (Mexico) G Olmos | 6 | 2 | [8]
4 | (Germany) V Heisen (Estonia) I Neel | 1 | 6 | [10]
