= 2019 President's Cup – Women's doubles =

Women's doubles
- 2019 President's Cup (tennis)

Final
- Champions: (Czech Republic) Marie Bouzková (Germany) Vivian Heisen
- Runners-up: (Russia) Vlada Koval (Russia) Kamilla Rakhimova
- Score: 7–6^{(10–8)}, 6–1

Events
Singles	men	women
Doubles	men	women
- President's Cup (tennis)

Berfu Cengiz and Anna Danilina were the defending champions but lost in the first round to Ilona Kremen and Iryna Shymanovich.

Marie Bouzková and Vivian Heisen won the title, defeating Vlada Koval and Kamilla Rakhimova in the final, 7–6^{(10–8)}, 6–1.

== Seeds ==
1. (Turkey) Berfu Cengiz / (Kazakhstan) Anna Danilina (first round)
2. (Russia) Olga Doroshina / (Russia) Polina Monova (first round)
3. (United Kingdom) Emily Webley-Smith / (Russia) Ekaterina Yashina (first round)
4. (Japan) Kyōka Okamura / (Japan) Akiko Omae (first round)

== Draw ==
Key

- Q = Qualifier
- WC = Wild card
- LL = Lucky loser
- Alt = Alternate
- ITF = ITF entry
- PR = Protected ranking
- SR = Special ranking
- SE = Special exempt
- JE = Junior exempt
- JR = Junior Accelerator Programme entrant
- CO = College Accelerator Programme entrant
- NG = Next Gen Accelerator Program entrant
- w/o = Walkover
- r = Retired
- d = Defaulted

=== Draw ===
First round
1	(Turkey) B Cengiz (Kazakhstan) A Danilina	4	6	[10]
(Belarus) I Kremen (Belarus) I Shymanovich	6	3	[12]
(Czech Republic) M Bouzková (Germany) V Heisen	6	6
WC	(Kazakhstan) D Detkovskaya (Kazakhstan) Z Kulambayeva	1	3
3	(United Kingdom) E Webley-Smith (Russia) E Yashina	1	2
(Uzbekistan) N Abduraimova (Serbia) N Kostić	6	6
WC	(Kazakhstan) A Astakhova (Israel) V Ekshibarova	7^{7}	2	[3]
WC	(Kazakhstan) Y Dmitrichenko (Russia) A Zakharova	6^{3}	6	[10]
(Hungary) G Arn (Japan) M Minokoshi	5	4
(Hong Kong) K-y Ng (China) S Zheng	7	6
(Russia) A Gasanova (Uzbekistan) S Sharipova	0	6	[11]
4	(Japan) K Okamura (Japan) A Omae	6	4	[9]
(Kyrgyzstan) K Palkina (Belarus) S Pirazhenka	3	6^{4}
(Russia) V Koval (Russia) K Rakhimova	6	7^{7}
(Turkey) İ Öz (Belarus) S Talbi	7	4	[11]
2	(Russia) O Doroshina (Russia) P Monova	5	6	[9]

Quarterfinals
(Belarus) I Kremen (Belarus) I Shymanovich	3	6^{3}
(Czech Republic) M Bouzková (Germany) V Heisen	6	7^{7}
(Uzbekistan) N Abduraimova (Serbia) N Kostić	6^{5}	6	[10]
WC	(Kazakhstan) Y Dmitrichenko (Russia) A Zakharova	7^{7}	4	[6]
(Hong Kong) K-y Ng (China) S Zheng	5	2
(Russia) A Gasanova (Uzbekistan) S Sharipova	7	6
(Russia) V Koval (Russia) K Rakhimova	6	6
(Turkey) İ Öz (Belarus) S Talbi	3	2

Semifinals
(Czech Republic) M Bouzková (Germany) V Heisen	7	6
(Uzbekistan) N Abduraimova (Serbia) N Kostić	5	1
(Russia) A Gasanova (Uzbekistan) S Sharipova	6	6^{5}	[7]
(Russia) V Koval (Russia) K Rakhimova	1	7^{7}	[10]

Final
(Czech Republic) M Bouzková (Germany) V Heisen	7^{10}	6
(Russia) V Koval (Russia) K Rakhimova	6^{8}	1
