= Firenze Ladies Open =

Defunct tennis tournament
- Event name: Firenze Ladies Open
- Tour: WTA Tour
- Founded: 2023
- Abolished: 2023
- Location: Florence; Italy
- Venue: Match Ball Firenze Country Club
- Category: WTA 125
- Surface: Clay – outdoors
- Draw: 32S / 16D
- Prize money: US$115,000 (2023)
- Website: Official website

Current champions (2023)
- Women's singles: (Italy) Jasmine Paolini
- Women's doubles: (Germany) Vivian Heisen (Estonia) Ingrid Neel

The Firenze Ladies Open is a WTA 125-level professional women's tennis tournament. It takes place on outdoor clay courts, in the month of May at the Match Ball Firenze Country Club in the city of Florence in Italy during the second week of Internazionali BNL d'Italia, a WTA 1000 tournament in Rome. The prize money is $115,000.

== Results ==
=== Singles ===
Year	Champion	Runner-up	Score
2023	(Italy) Jasmine Paolini	(United States) Taylor Townsend	6–3, 7–5

=== Doubles ===
Year	Champions	Runners-up	Score
2023	(Germany) Vivian Heisen (Estonia) Ingrid Neel	(United States) Asia Muhammad (Mexico) Giuliana Olmos	1–6, 6–2, [10–8]

== See also ==
- ATP Florence
- Firenze Tennis Cup
