= 2023 Firenze Ladies Open =

- Date: 15–21 May
- Edition: 1st
- Category: WTA 125
- Draw: 32S / 16D
- Prize money: $115,000
- Surface: Clay
- Location: Florence, Italy
- Venue: Match Ball Firenze Country Club

Champions

Singles
- (Italy) Jasmine Paolini

Doubles
- (Germany) Vivian Heisen / (Estonia) Ingrid Neel
- Firenze Ladies Open

The 2023 Firenze Ladies Open was a professional tennis tournament played on outdoor clay courts. It was the first edition of the tournament and part of the 2023 WTA 125 tournaments, offering a total of $115,000 in prize money. It took place at the Match Ball Firenze Country Club in Florence, Italy between 15 and 21 May 2023.

== Singles entrants ==
=== Seeds ===
Country	Player	Rank^{1}	Seed
~~USA~~	~~Lauren Davis~~	~~53~~	~~1~~
USA	Claire Liu	56	2
ROU	Ana Bogdan	59	3
ITA	Jasmine Paolini	65	4
GER	Jule Niemeier	74	5
ITA	Sara Errani	78	6
SVK	Anna Karolína Schmiedlová	97	7
ITA	Lucia Bronzetti	98	8
ITA	Lucrezia Stefanini	105	9

- ^{1} Rankings are as of 8 May 2023.

=== Other entrants ===
The following players received a wildcard into the singles main draw:

- (Italy) Diletta Cherubini
- (Italy) Matilde Paoletti
- (Italy) Lisa Pigato
- (Italy) Camilla Rosatello

The following players entered the main draw through protected ranking:

- (Canada) Eugenie Bouchard

The following players received entry into the main draw through qualification:

- (Italy) Deborah Chiesa
- (Slovenia) Dalila Jakupović
- (Switzerland) Céline Naef
- (India) Ankita Raina

The following player received entry as a lucky loser:

- (United States) Asia Muhammad

=== Withdrawals ===
- Erika Andreeva → replaced by (Italy) Nuria Brancaccio
- (United States) Lauren Davis → replaced by (United States) Asia Muhammad
- (Austria) Julia Grabher → replaced by (Australia) Priscilla Hon
- (Montenegro) Danka Kovinić → replaced by (Australia) Olivia Gadecki
- (Czech Republic) Tereza Martincová → replaced by (United Kingdom) Heather Watson
- (Spain) Rebeka Masarova → replaced by (Mexico) Fernanda Contreras
- (Czech Republic) Karolína Muchová → replaced by (United States) Katrina Scott
- (Spain) Nuria Párrizas Díaz → replaced by (Italy) Lucrezia Stefanini
- (Sweden) Rebecca Peterson → replaced by (Belgium) Magali Kempen
- (United States) Alison Riske-Amritraj → replaced by (Switzerland) Ylena In-Albon
- (Egypt) Mayar Sherif → replaced by (United Kingdom) Katie Swan
- (Romania) Patricia Maria Țig → replaced by (Croatia) Ana Konjuh
- (Ukraine) Lesia Tsurenko → replaced by Elina Avanesyan

== Doubles entrants ==
=== Seeds ===
Country	Player	Country	Player	Rank	Seed
USA	Asia Muhammad	MEX	Giuliana Olmos	49	1
CHI	Alexa Guarachi	NZL	Erin Routliffe	79	2
CZE	Renata Voráčová	TPE	Wu Fang-hsien	170	3
GER	Vivian Heisen	EST	Ingrid Neel	213	4

- Rankings as of 8 May 2023.

== Champions ==
=== Singles ===
- (Italy) Jasmine Paolini def. (United States) Taylor Townsend, 6–3, 7–5

=== Doubles ===
- (Germany) Vivian Heisen / (Estonia) Ingrid Neel def. (United States) Asia Muhammad / (Mexico) Giuliana Olmos, 1–6, 6–2, [10–8]
