= 2019 President's Cup – Men's doubles =

Men's doubles
- 2019 President's Cup (tennis)

Final
- Champions: (Kazakhstan) Andrey Golubev (Kazakhstan) Aleksandr Nedovyesov
- Runners-up: (South Korea) Chung Yun-seong (South Korea) Nam Ji-sung
- Score: 6–4, 6–4

Events
Singles	men	women
Doubles	men	women
- President's Cup (tennis)

Mikhail Elgin and Yaraslav Shyla were the defending champions but chose not to defend their title.

Andrey Golubev and Aleksandr Nedovyesov won the title after defeating Chung Yun-seong and Nam Ji-sung 6–4, 6–4 in the final.

== Seeds ==
1. (Switzerland) Luca Margaroli / (Chinese Taipei) Yang Tsung-hua (first round)
2. (Kazakhstan) Timur Khabibulin / (Ukraine) Vladyslav Manafov (first round)
3. (India) Arjun Kadhe / (Kazakhstan) Denis Yevseyev (first round)
4. (South Korea) Chung Yun-seong / (South Korea) Nam Ji-sung (final)

== Draw ==
Key

- Q = Qualifier
- WC = Wild card
- LL = Lucky loser
- Alt = Alternate
- ITF = ITF entry
- PR = Protected ranking
- SR = Special ranking
- SE = Special exempt
- JE = Junior exempt
- JR = Junior Accelerator Programme entrant
- CO = College Accelerator Programme entrant
- NG = Next Gen Accelerator Program entrant
- w/o = Walkover
- r = Retired
- d = Defaulted

First round
1	(Switzerland) L Margaroli (Chinese Taipei) T-h Yang	4	4
(Austria) L Miedler (Italy) M Viola	6	6
WC	(Russia) Bulat Galiev (Turkey) M İlhan	3	4
(Ukraine) I Marchenko (Portugal) G Oliveira	6	6
4	(South Korea) Y-s Chung (South Korea) J-s Nam	7^{7}	6
WC	(Uzbekistan) S Fayziev (Uzbekistan) K Sultanov	6^{4}	3
(Australia) H Bourchier (Russia) P Kotov	6	6
ITF	(Zimbabwe) B Lock (Zimbabwe) CJ Lock	4	2
(Austria) S Ofner (Bosnia and Herzegovina) A Šetkić	5	6^{3}
ITF	(France) Baptiste Crepatte (France) A Rinderknech	7	7^{7}
PR	(Colombia) N Barrientos (Argentina) F Mena	6	6
3	(India) A Kadhe (Kazakhstan) D Yevseyev	0	1
(India) S Mukund (China) Zh Zhang	6^{2}	4
(Russia) T Gabashvili (Belarus) E Gerasimov	7^{7}	6
WC	(Kazakhstan) A Golubev (Kazakhstan) A Nedovyesov	7^{7}	7^{7}
2	(Kazakhstan) T Khabibulin (Ukraine) V Manafov	6^{3}	6^{5}

Quarterfinals
(Austria) L Miedler (Italy) M Viola	7	2	[8]
(Ukraine) I Marchenko (Portugal) G Oliveira	5	6	[10]
4	(South Korea) Y-s Chung (South Korea) J-s Nam	6	6
(Australia) H Bourchier (Russia) P Kotov	4	1
ITF	(France) B Crepatte (France) A Rinderknech	5	2
PR	(Colombia) N Barrientos (Argentina) F Mena	7	6
(Russia) T Gabashvili (Belarus) E Gerasimov	0^{r}
WC	(Kazakhstan) A Golubev (Kazakhstan) A Nedovyesov	2

Semifinals
(Ukraine) I Marchenko (Portugal) G Oliveira	6	6^{2}	[8]
4	(South Korea) Y-s Chung (South Korea) J-s Nam	3	7^{7}	[10]
PR	(Colombia) N Barrientos (Argentina) F Mena	5	3
WC	(Kazakhstan) A Golubev (Kazakhstan) A Nedovyesov	7	6

Final
4	(South Korea) Y-s Chung (South Korea) J-s Nam	4	4
WC	(Kazakhstan) A Golubev (Kazakhstan) A Nedovyesov	6	6
