= 2019 President's Cup – Men's singles =

Men's singles
- 2019 President's Cup (tennis)

Final
- Champion: (Russia) Evgeny Donskoy
- Runner-up: (United States) Sebastian Korda
- Score: 7–6^{(7–5)}, 3–6, 6–4

Events
Singles	men	women
Doubles	men	women
- President's Cup (tennis)

Sebastian Ofner was the defending champion but lost in the third round to Aleksandar Vukic.

Evgeny Donskoy won the title after defeating Sebastian Korda 7–6^{(7–5)}, 3–6, 6–4 in the final.

== Seeds ==
All seeds receive a bye into the second round.

1. (Russia) Evgeny Donskoy (champion)
2. (Italy) Lorenzo Giustino (second round)
3. (Austria) Sebastian Ofner (third round)
4. (Belarus) Egor Gerasimov (quarterfinals)
5. (Kazakhstan) Aleksandr Nedovyesov (third round)
6. (Bosnia and Herzegovina) Mirza Bašić (third round)
7. (Austria) Lucas Miedler (third round)
8. (South Korea) Chung Yun-seong (quarterfinals)
9. (Portugal) Gonçalo Oliveira (third round)
10. (Italy) Matteo Viola (quarterfinals)
11. (Austria) Jurij Rodionov (second round)
12. (Russia) Pavel Kotov (second round)
13. (India) Sasikumar Mukund (second round)
14. (Australia) Aleksandar Vukic (semifinals)
15. (South Korea) Nam Ji-sung (third round)
16. (China) Zhang Zhizhen (second round)

== Draw ==
Key

- Q = Qualifier
- WC = Wild card
- LL = Lucky loser
- Alt = Alternate
- ITF = ITF entry
- PR = Protected ranking
- SR = Special ranking
- SE = Special exempt
- JE = Junior exempt
- JR = Junior Accelerator Programme entrant
- CO = College Accelerator Programme entrant
- NG = Next Gen Accelerator Program entrant
- w/o = Walkover
- r = Retired
- d = Defaulted

=== Finals ===
Quarterfinals
1	(Russia) Evgeny Donskoy	6	7^{7}
(Portugal) Gastão Elias	4	6^{4}
4	(Belarus) Egor Gerasimov	7^{8}	6^{1}	4
(Uzbekistan) Khumoyun Sultanov	6^{6}	7^{7}	6
8	(South Korea) Chung Yun-seong	3	2
14	(Australia) Aleksandar Vukic	6	6
10	(Italy) Matteo Viola	4	5
(United States) Sebastian Korda	6	7

Semifinals
1	(Russia) Evgeny Donskoy	3	6	7^{7}
(Uzbekistan) Khumoyun Sultanov	6	1	6^{5}
14	(Australia) Aleksandar Vukic	6^{3}	3
(United States) Sebastian Korda	7^{7}	6

Final
1	(Russia) Evgeny Donskoy	7^{7}	3	6
(United States) Sebastian Korda	6^{5}	6	4

=== Top half ===
==== Section 1 ====
First round
(United States) A Ayeni	6	6
WC	(Uzbekistan) S Fomin	4	4
(Russia) T Gabashvili	6	6
(Israel) B Patael	3	2
(Portugal) G Elias	6	6
PR	(Colombia) N Barrientos	1	1
ITF	(Spain) N Sánchez Izquierdo	6	4	6
Q	(Switzerland) L Margaroli	3	6	3

Second round
1	(Russia) E Donskoy	6	6
(United States) A Ayeni	2	3
(Russia) T Gabashvili	6	4	2
15	(South Korea) J-s Nam	1	6	6
12	(Russia) P Kotov	4	0
(Portugal) G Elias	6	6
ITF	(Spain) N Sánchez Izquierdo	4	6	3
6	(Bosnia and Herzegovina) M Bašić	6	3	6

Third round
1	(Russia) E Donskoy	3	6	6
15	(South Korea) J-s Nam	6	1	4
(Portugal) G Elias	3	6	7^{8}
6	(Bosnia and Herzegovina) M Bašić	6	3	6^{6}

Quarterfinals
1	(Russia) E Donskoy	6	7^{7}
(Portugal) G Elias	4	6^{4}

==== Section 2 ====
First round
ITF	(Russia) K Kravchuk	6	7^{7}
(Australia) H Bourchier	4	6^{3}
ITF	(Japan) Shuichi Sekiguchi	6	6
WC	(Kazakhstan) Dostanbek Tashbulatov	3	1
(France) Baptiste Crepatte	6^{1}	4
(Uzbekistan) K Sultanov	7^{7}	6
Alt	(Czech Republic) M Vrbenský	2	3
(Kazakhstan) D Yevseyev	6	6

Second round
4	(Belarus) E Gerasimov	7	6
ITF	(Russia) K Kravchuk	5	4
ITF	(Japan) S Sekiguchi	7	6
16	(China) Zh Zhang	5	4
11	(Austria) J Rodionov	5	6	2
(Uzbekistan) K Sultanov	7	2	6
(Kazakhstan) D Yevseyev	1	1
7	(Austria) L Miedler	6	6

Third round
4	(Belarus) E Gerasimov	6	6
ITF	(Japan) S Sekiguchi	2	0
(Uzbekistan) K Sultanov	6	6
7	(Austria) L Miedler	3	4

Quarterfinals
4	(Belarus) E Gerasimov	7^{8}	6^{1}	4
(Uzbekistan) K Sultanov	6^{6}	7^{7}	6

=== Bottom half ===
==== Section 3 ====
First round
WC	(Kazakhstan) A Golubev	6^{8}	4
(Israel) E Leshem	7^{10}	6
(Bosnia and Herzegovina) A Šetkić	4	6	4
(Vietnam) NH Lý	6	3	6
(Chinese Taipei) T-h Yang	6	3	7
(India) A Kadhe	2	6	5
(Ukraine) I Marchenko	7^{7}	7^{7}
WC	(Turkey) M İlhan	6^{3}	6^{5}

Second round
8	(South Korea) Y-s Chung	6	4	6
(Israel) E Leshem	4	6	4
(Vietnam) NH Lý	4	4
9	(Portugal) G Oliveira	6	6
14	(Australia) A Vukic	6	2	6
(Chinese Taipei) T-h Yang	3	6	4
(Ukraine) I Marchenko	3	6	3
3	(Austria) S Ofner	6	3	6

Third round
8	(South Korea) Y-s Chung	6^{3}	7	6
9	(Portugal) G Oliveira	7^{7}	5	4
14	(Australia) A Vukic	4	6	6
3	(Austria) S Ofner	6	3	4

Quarterfinals
8	(South Korea) Y-s Chung	3	2
14	(Australia) A Vukic	6	6

==== Section 4 ====
First round
WC	(Kazakhstan) G Lomakin	6^{0}	2
(Argentina) F Mena	7^{7}	6
(India) Sidharth Rawat	6	6
ITF	(Uzbekistan) S Fayziev	2	2
(France) A Rinderknech	6	6
Q	(Ukraine) V Manafov	4	3
(United States) S Korda	5
ITF	(Russia) E Tiurnev	1^{r}

Second round
5	(Kazakhstan) A Nedovyesov	6	6
(Argentina) F Mena	3	2
(India) S Rawat	1	6	1
10	(Italy) M Viola	6	2	6
13	(India) S Mukund	6^{8}	6^{5}
(France) A Rinderknech	7^{10}	7^{7}
(United States) S Korda	7	6
2	(Italy) L Giustino	5	3

Third round
5	(Kazakhstan) A Nedovyesov	6^{4}	4
10	(Italy) M Viola	7^{7}	6
(France) A Rinderknech	7^{7}	3	4
(United States) S Korda	6^{5}	6	6

Quarterfinals
10	(Italy) M Viola	4	5
(United States) S Korda	6	7
