= Ingrid Neel =

Estonian tennis player (born 1998)

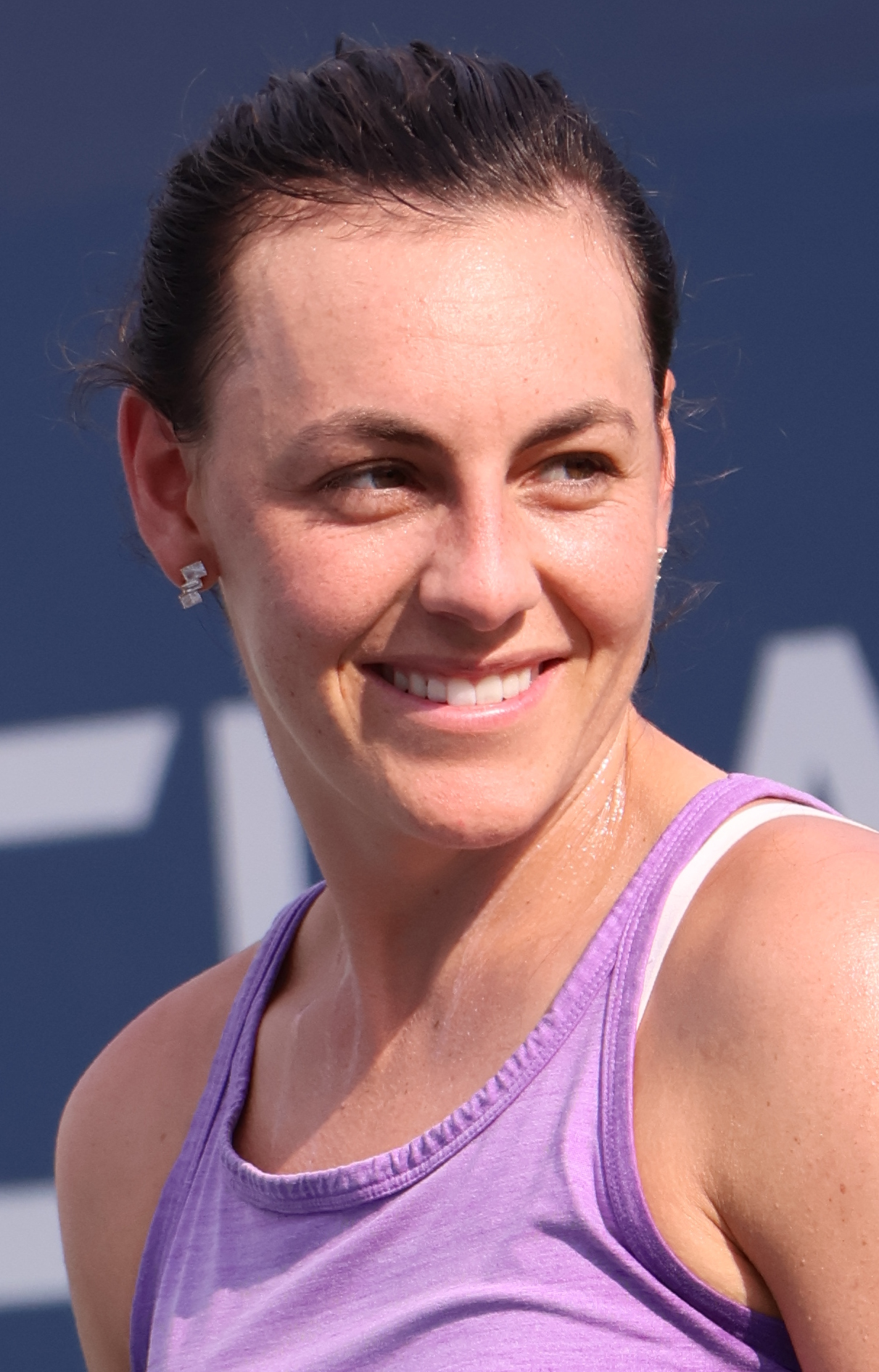
- Neel in 2024
- Country (sports): United States; Estonia (since April 2023)
- Residence: Bradenton, Florida
- Born: June 16, 1998 (age 28) Oyster Bay, New York
- Height: 1.68 m (5 ft 6 in)
- Plays: Right-handed (two-handed backhand)
- Prize money: $649,971

Singles
- Career record: 104–91
- Career titles: 2 ITF
- Highest ranking: No. 501 (8 June 2015)

Doubles
- Career record: 244–187
- Career titles: 4 WTA, 14 ITF
- Highest ranking: No. 33 (6 May 2024)
- Current ranking: No. 56 (19 October 2026)

Grand Slam doubles results
- Australian Open: 1R (2022, 2026)
- French Open: 3R (2024)
- Wimbledon: QF (2026)
- US Open: 3R (2026)

Team competitions
- Fed Cup: 8–1
- Last updated on: 25 October 2026.

Ingrid Neel (born June 16, 1998) is an American-Estonian professional tennis player. She has specialized in doubles and has won four titles on the WTA Tour and three titles on the WTA Challenger Tour. In addition, she has won two singles titles and 14 doubles titles on the ITF Circuit. On 6 May 2024, she achieved a career-high of No. 33 in the WTA doubles rankings.

== Personal life ==
Her Estonian grandmother (also named Ingrid) emigrated from Saaremaa to the United States during World War II to avoid Soviet deportation. Her relatives live in Tallinn.

In 2017, tennisrecruiting.net ranked Neel the number one incoming college freshman in the United States. Ingrid attended University of Florida. As the sole freshman on the top-ranked Gators women's tennis team, she clinched championship-winning matches for team victories in the finals of Indoor Nationals vs. North Carolina and the finals of the NCAA National Championship vs. Stanford in 2018.

== Career ==
=== 2015: Major debut ===
By winning the Junior National Doubles Championships in 2015, Neel was awarded a wildcard from the United States Tennis Association into the women's doubles tournament of the US Open alongside Tornado Alicia Black where the duo won round one. They were unable to accept the substantial prize money since, at the time, it would have rendered them ineligible for participation in college tennis competition.

=== 2021: Maiden WTA Tour title ===
In April 2021, she won her first tour title at the Copa Colsanitas in Bogota, partnering with French player Elixane Lechemia and defeating the third seeded pair of Mihaela Buzărnescu and Anna-Lena Friedsam.

=== 2022–24: WTA 125 & 500 titles, top 35 ===
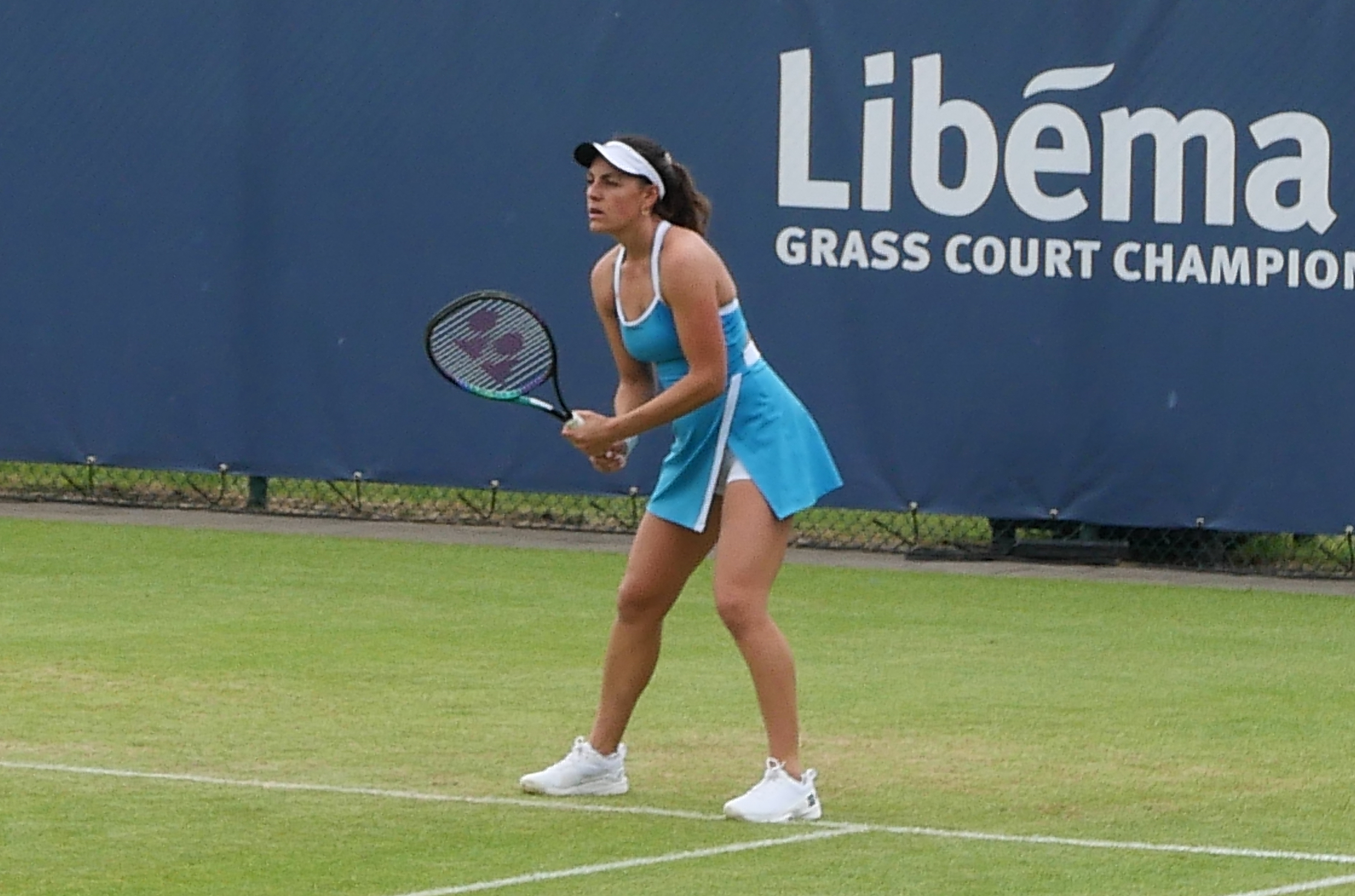
Neel at the 2026 Rosmalen Open

In July 2022, at Wimbledon with partner Aliona Bolsova, Neel upset multiple major singles and doubles titles holder Samantha Stosur and her partner Latisha Chan in the first round.

Neel won her first WTA 125 trophy, partnering German Vivian Heisen, at the 2023 Firenze Ladies Open. At the 2023 Pan Pacific Open in Tokyo, she won her biggest title to date with Ulrikke Eikeri.

Neel won her fourth career doubles title at the 2024 Rosmalen Open, partnering with Dutch player Bibiane Schoofs.

=== 2025–26: Return to play, WTA 250 final ===
In November 2025, Neel returned to court to play two W35 tournaments with Abigail Rencheli, making semifinals and winning, respectively.

Neel recorded her best Grand Slam tournament result at the 2026 Wimbledon Championships, making it to the quarterfinals.

== Grand Slam performance timeline ==
Key
W	F	SF	QF	#R	RR	Q#	P#	DNQ	A	Z#	PO	G	S	B	NMS	NTI	P	NH

(W) winner; (F) finalist; (SF) semifinalist; (QF) quarterfinalist; (#R) rounds 4, 3, 2, 1; (RR) round-robin stage; (Q#) qualification round; (P#) preliminary round; (DNQ) did not qualify; (A) absent; (Z#) Davis/Fed Cup Zonal Group (with number indication) or (PO) play-off; (G) gold, (S) silver or (B) bronze Olympic/Paralympic medal; (NMS) not a Masters tournament; (NTI) not a Tier I tournament; (P) postponed; (NH) not held; (SR) strike rate (events won / competed); (W–L) win–loss record.
To avoid confusion and double counting, these charts are updated at the conclusion of a tournament or when the player's participation has ended.

=== Doubles ===
Tournament	2018	2019	2020	2021	2022	2023	2024	2025	2026	SR	W–L
Australian Open	A	A	A	A	1R	A	A	A	1R	0 / 2	0–2
French Open	A	A	A	A	A	2R	3R	A	A	0 / 2	3–2
Wimbledon	A	A	NH	2R	2R	1R	2R	A	QF	0 / 5	6–5
US Open	A	A	A	1R	2R	1R	1R	A	3R	0 / 5	3–5
Win–Loss	0–0	0–0	0–0	1–2	2–3	1–3	3–3	0–0	5–3	0 / 14	12–14

== WTA Tour finals ==
=== Doubles: 6 (4 titles, 2 runner-ups) ===
Legend WTA 1000 (0–0) WTA 500 (1–1) WTA 250 (3–1)	Finals by surface Hard (1–0) Grass (2–1) Clay (1–1)

Result	W–L	Date	Tournament	Tier	Surface	Partner	Opponents	Score
Win	1–0	Apr 2021	Copa Colsanitas, Colombia	WTA 250	Clay	(France) Elixane Lechemia	(Romania) Mihaela Buzărnescu (Germany) Anna-Lena Friedsam	6–3, 6–4
Win	2–0	Jun 2023	Nottingham Open, United Kingdom	WTA 250	Grass	(Norway) Ulrikke Eikeri	(United Kingdom) Harriet Dart (United Kingdom) Heather Watson	7–6^{(8–6)}, 5–7, [10–8]
Win	3–0	Sep 2023	Pan Pacific Open, Japan	WTA 500	Hard	(Norway) Ulrikke Eikeri	(Japan) Eri Hozumi (Japan) Makoto Ninomiya	3–6, 7–5, [10–5]
Loss	3–1	Apr 2024	Stuttgart Open, Germany	WTA 500	Clay (i)	(Norway) Ulrikke Eikeri	(Chinese Taipei) Chan Hao-ching; Veronika Kudermetova	6–4, 3–6, [2–10]
Win	4–1	Jun 2024	Rosmalen Open, Netherlands	WTA 250	Grass	(Netherlands) Bibiane Schoofs	(Slovakia) Tereza Mihalíková (United Kingdom) Olivia Nicholls	7–6^{(8–6)}, 6–3
Loss	4–2	Jun 2026	Rosmalen Open, Netherlands	WTA 250	Grass	(Mexico) Giuliana Olmos	(Japan) Shuko Aoyama (Chinese Taipei) Liang En-shuo	2–6, 6–2, [7–10]

== WTA 125 finals ==
=== Doubles: 3 (3 titles) ===
Result	W–L	Date	Tournament	Surface	Partner	Opponents	Score
Win	1–0	May 2023	Firenze Ladies Open, Italy	Clay	(Germany) Vivian Heisen	(United States) Asia Muhammad (Mexico) Giuliana Olmos	1–6, 6–2, [10–8]
Win	2–0	Jun 2023	Makarska International, Croatia	Clay	(Chinese Taipei) Wu Fang-hsien	(Czech Republic) Anna Sisková (Czech Republic) Renata Voráčová	6–3, 7–5
Win	3–0	Aug 2023	Chicago Challenger, United States	Hard	(Norway) Ulrikke Eikeri	(Spain) Cristina Bucșa; Alexandra Panova	walkover

== ITF Circuit finals ==
=== Singles: 2 (2 titles) ===
Legend $10,000 tournaments (2–0)	Finals by surface Clay (2–0)

Result	W–L	Date	Tournament	Tier	Surface	Opponent	Score
Win	1–0	Sep 2014	ITF Amelia Island, United States	10,000	Clay	(United States) Edina Gallovits-Hall	4–4 ret.
Win	2–0	Jun 2016	ITF Bethany Beach, United States	10,000	Clay	(United States) Alexandra Mueller	6–3, 6–3

=== Doubles: 19 (14 titles, 5 runner-ups) ===
Legend $100,000 tournaments (2–1) $80,000 tournaments (1–2) $50/60,000 tournaments (4–1) $25,000 tournaments (4–1) $10,000 tournaments (3–0)	Finals by surface Hard (4–4) Clay (8–1) Grass (1–0) Carpet (1–0)

Result	W–L	Date	Tournament	Tier	Surface	Partner	Opponents	Score
Win	1–0	Mar 2015	ITF Gainesville, US	10,000	Clay	(Hungary) Fanny Stollár	(United States) Sofia Kenin (United States) Marie Norris	6–3, 6–3
Win	2–0	Mar 2015	ITF Orlando, US	10,000	Clay	(Hungary) Fanny Stollár	(Czech Republic) Kateřina Kramperová (United States) Katerina Stewart	6–3, 7–6^{(4)}
Win	3–0	Jan 2016	ITF Wesley Chapel, US	25,000	Clay	(Russia) Natalia Vikhlyantseva	(Russia) Natela Dzalamidze (Russia) Veronika Kudermetova	4–6, 7–6^{(4)}, [10–6]
Win	4–0	Feb 2016	Midland Tennis Classic, US	100,000	Hard (i)	(United States) CiCi Bellis	(United Kingdom) Naomi Broady (United States) Shelby Rogers	6–2, 6–4
Win	5–0	Jun 2016	ITF Buffalo, US	10,000	Clay	(United States) Caroline Dolehide	(United States) Sophie Chang (United States) Alexandra Mueller	5–7, 6–3, [10–6]
Loss	5–1	Jun 2016	ITF Baton Rouge, US	25,000	Hard	(United States) Jamie Loeb	(United States) Lauren Herring (Australia) Ellen Perez	3–6, 3–6
Win	6–1	Sep 2016	Atlanta Open, US	50,000	Hard	(Brazil) Luisa Stefani	(United States) Alexandra Stevenson (United States) Taylor Townsend	4–6, 6–4, [10–5]
Win	7–1	Nov 2016	Scottsdale Challenge, US	50,000	Hard	(United States) Taylor Townsend	(United States) Samantha Crawford (United States) Melanie Oudin	6–4, 6–3
Win	8–1	Oct 2018	ITF Óbidos, Portugal	25,000	Carpet	(Netherlands) Michaëlla Krajicek	(Spain) Cristina Bucșa (Latvia) Diāna Marcinkeviča	6–2, 6–2
Loss	8–2	Oct 2018	Tennis Classic of Macon, US	80,000	Hard	(Kazakhstan) Anna Danilina	(United States) Caty McNally (United States) Jessica Pegula	1–6, 7–5, [9–11]
Win	9–2	Apr 2019	Clay Court Championships, US	W80	Clay	(United States) Quinn Gleason	(Uzbekistan) Akgul Amanmuradova (Australia) Lizette Cabrera	5–7, 7–5, [10–8]
Loss	9–3	Jul 2019	Challenger de Granby, Canada	W80	Hard	(United States) Quinn Gleason	(Japan) Haruka Kaji (Japan) Junri Namigata	6–7^{(5)}, 7–5, [8–10]
Loss	9–4	Aug 2019	Concord Tennis Open, US	W60	Hard	(United States) Elizabeth Halbauer	(United States) Angela Kulikov (United States) Rianna Valdes	6–7^{(3)}, 6–4, [15–17]
Win	10–4	Oct 2019	LTP Charleston Pro, US	W60	Clay	(Kazakhstan) Anna Danilina	(Montenegro) Vladica Babić (United States) Caitlin Whoriskey	6–1, 6–1
Win	11–4	Oct 2019	ITF Hilton Head, US	W25	Clay	(Kazakhstan) Anna Danilina	(United States) Katharine Fahey (United States) Elizabeth Halbauer	6–3, 6–2
Win	12–4	Jun 2022	Surbiton Trophy, UK	W100	Grass	(Netherlands) Rosalie van der Hoek	(Mexico) Fernanda Contreras Gómez (United States) Catherine Harrison	6–3, 6–3
Win	13–4	Feb 2023	Guanajuato Open, Mexico	W60+H	Hard	(United States) Emina Bektas	(France) Elixane Lechemia (United States) Quinn Gleason	7–6^{(4)}, 3–6, [10–6]
Win	14–4	Dec 2025	ITF Daytona Beach, US	W35	Clay	(United States) Abigail Rencheli	(United States) Anastasia Goncharova (United States) Madison Tattini	6–3, 6–2
Loss	14–5	May 2026	ITF Indian Harbour Beach, US	W100	Clay	(United States) Abigail Rencheli	(United States) Anna Rogers (United States) Allura Zamarripa	3–6, 0–6
