= Vlada Koval =

Russian tennis player

Vlada Koval Влада Коваль
- Full name: Vlada Aleksandrovna Koval
- Country (sports): Russia
- Born: 11 July 2001 (age 25) Bryansk, Russia
- Plays: Right (two-handed backhand)
- Prize money: US$ 52,927

Singles
- Career record: 137–100
- Career titles: 1 ITF
- Highest ranking: No. 339 (26 July 2021)

Doubles
- Career record: 61–50
- Career titles: 5 ITF
- Highest ranking: No. 323 (7 March 2022)

Vlada Aleksandrovna Koval (Russian: Влада Александровна Коваль; born 11 July 2001) is an inactive Russian tennis player.

Koval has a career-high WTA singles ranking of 339, achieved on 26 July 2021. She also has a career-high WTA doubles ranking of 323, reached on 7 March 2022. Koval has won one singles title and five doubles titles on the ITF Women's Circuit.

On the ITF Junior Circuit, she has a career-high combined ranking of 63, achieved on 30 January 2017.

Koval made her Fed Cup debut for Russia in 2019.

== ITF Circuit finals ==
Legend
$80,000 tournaments
$60,000 tournaments
$25,000 tournaments
$15,000 tournaments

=== Singles: 5 (1 title, 4 runner–ups) ===
Result	W–L	Date	Tournament	Tier	Surface	Opponent	Score
Loss	0–1	Jan 2018	ITF Antalya, Turkey	15,000	Clay	(Luxembourg) Eléonora Molinaro	3–6, 1–6
Loss	0–2	Aug 2018	ITF Moscow, Russia	15,000	Clay	(Russia) Anastasiya Komardina	4–6, 1–6
Win	1–2	Sep 2018	ITF Moscow, Russia	15,000	Clay	(Russia) Daria Mishina	6–2, 7–6^{(6)}
Loss	1–3	Jul 2019	ITF Moscow, Russia	25,000	Clay	(Russia) Victoria Kan	1–6, 6–7^{(2)}
Loss	1–4	Aug 2019	ITF Moscow, Russia	15,000	Clay	(Russia) Amina Anshba	4–6, 2–6

=== Doubles: 9 (5 titles, 4 runner–ups) ===
Result	W–L	Date	Tournament	Tier	Surface	Partner	Opponents	Score
Win	1–0	Apr 2018	ITF Antalya, Turkey	15,000	Clay	(Russia) Ulyana Ayzatulina	(Slovenia) Veronika Erjavec (Slovenia) Nina Potočnik	6–1, 6–4
Win	2–0	Aug 2018	ITF Moscow, Russia	15,000	Clay	(Moldova) Vitalia Stamat	(Russia) Anastasia Frolova (Russia) Anna Morgina	7–6^{(5)}, 5–7, [10–6]
Loss	2–1	Jul 2019	President's Cup, Kazakhstan	80,000	Hard	(Russia) Kamilla Rakhimova	(Czech Republic) Marie Bouzková (Germany) Vivian Heisen	6–7^{(7)}, 1–6
Loss	2–2	Aug 2019	ITF Moscow, Russia	15,000	Clay	(Russia) Evgeniya Levashova	(Russia) Amina Anshba (Russia) Aleksandra Pospelova	4–6, 3–6
Win	3–2	Aug 2019	ITF Penza, Russia	25,000	Hard	(Russia) Kamilla Rakhimova	(Russia) Anastasia Gasanova (Ukraine) Ganna Poznikhirenko	6–0, 6–3
Loss	3–3	Jul 2021	ITF Astana, Kazakhstan	25,000	Hard	(Russia) Anastasia Tikhonova	(Georgia (country)) Mariam Bolkvadze (Russia) Ekaterina Yashina	6–7^{(7)}, 1–6
Loss	3–4	Sep 2021	ITF Johannesburg, South Africa	25,000	Hard	(Russia) Amina Anshba	(Netherlands) Eva Vedder (Netherlands) Stéphanie Visscher	4–6, 4–6
Win	4–4	Mar 2022	ITF Antalya, Turkey	15,000	Clay	(Russia) Daria Lodikova	(Russia) Julia Avdeeva (Greece) Sapfo Sakellaridi	6–4, 3–6, [10–4]
Win	5–4	Apr 2022	ITF Antalya, Turkey	15,000	Clay	(Bulgaria) Gergana Topalova	(Russia) Ksenia Laskutova (Greece) Sapfo Sakellaridi	7–6^{(9)}, 6–2

== Fed Cup/Billie Jean King Cup participation ==
=== Doubles (1–0) ===
Edition	Round	Date	Location	Against	Surface	Partner	Opponents	W/L	Score
2019	WG2 PO	Apr 2019	Moscow (RUS)	Italy	Clay (i)	Anastasia Potapova	Sara Errani; Jasmine Paolini	W	4–6, 6–3, [10–7]
