= Vivian Heisen =

German tennis player

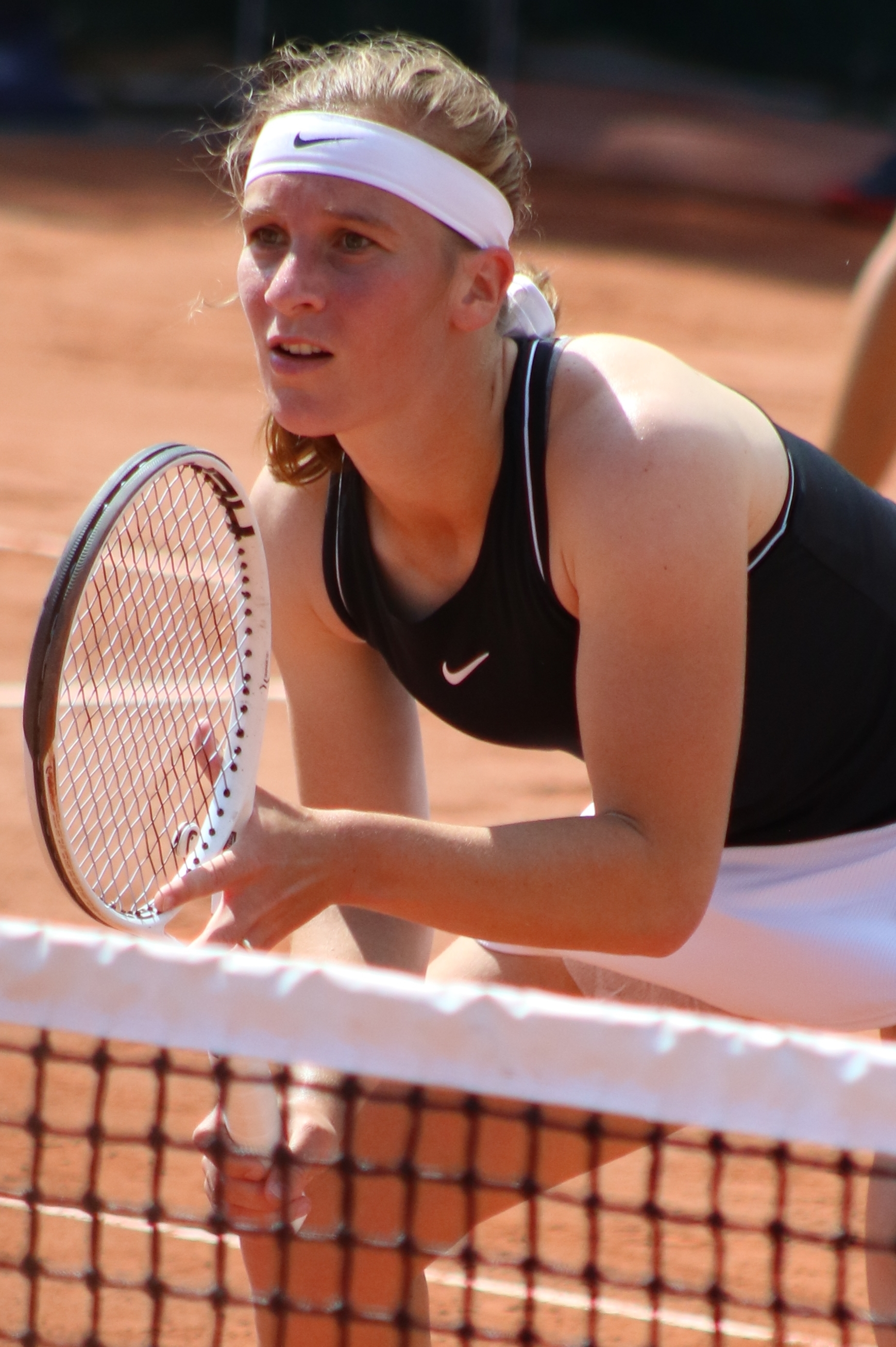
- Heisen at the 2021 French Open
- Country (sports): Germany
- Residence: Wiefelstede, Germany
- Born: 27 December 1993 (age 32) Oldenburg, Germany
- Height: 1.73 m (5 ft 8 in)
- Plays: Right-handed (two-handed backhand)
- Prize money: $267,920

Singles
- Career record: 181–147
- Career titles: 2 ITF
- Highest ranking: No. 328 (23 October 2017)

Doubles
- Career record: 145–145
- Career titles: 1 WTA Challenger, 10 ITF
- Highest ranking: No. 61 (18 April 2022)
- Current ranking: No. 1648 (28 October 2024)

Grand Slam doubles results
- Australian Open: 1R (2023)
- French Open: 2R (2021)
- Wimbledon: 1R (2021, 2022)
- US Open: 1R (2022)

Grand Slam mixed doubles results
- Wimbledon: 1R (2021)
- Last updated on: 30 October 2024.

Vivian Heisen (born 27 December 1993) is a German professional tennis player. She is a doubles specialist who reached her career-high WTA doubles ranking of world No. 61 in April 2022.

== Career ==
Heisen made her WTA Tour main-draw debut at the 2019 Morocco Open in the doubles competition where she and partner Johanna Larsson lost to María José Martínez Sánchez and Sara Sorribes Tormo.

She reached her maiden doubles final at the WTA 500 2022 Sydney Tennis Classic, partnering Panna Udvardy.

She won her first WTA 125 trophy partnering Estonian Ingrid Neel at the 2023 Firenze Ladies Open.

== Doubles performance timeline ==
Key
W	F	SF	QF	#R	RR	Q#	DNQ	A	NH

(W) winner; (F) finalist; (SF) semifinalist; (QF) quarterfinalist; (#R) rounds 4, 3, 2, 1; (RR) round-robin stage; (Q#) qualification round; (DNQ) did not qualify; (A) absent; (NH) not held; (SR) strike rate (events won / competed); (W–L) win–loss record.
To avoid confusion and double counting, these charts are updated at the conclusion of a tournament or when the player's participation has ended.

Only WTA Tour and Grand Slam tournament results are considered in the win-loss statistics.

Current through the 2024 WTA Tour.

Tournament	2019	2020	2021	2022	2023	2024	SR	W–L
Grand Slam tournaments
Australian Open	A	A	A	A	1R	A	0 / 1	0–1
French Open	A	1R	2R	1R	A	A	0 / 3	1–3
Wimbledon	A	NH	1R	1R	A	A	0 / 2	0–2
US Open	A	A	A	1R	A	A	0 / 1	0–1
Win–loss	0–0	0–1	1–2	0–3	0–1	0–0	0 / 7	1–7
WTA 1000 tournaments
Madrid Open	A	NH	A	1R	A	A	0 / 1	0–1
Italian Open	A	NH	A	1R	A	A	0 / 1	0–1
Canadian Open	A	NH	2R	2R	A	A	0 / 2	2–2
Win–loss	0–0	0–0	1–1	1–3	0–0	0–0	0 / 4	2–4
Career statistics
Tournaments	3	5	15	21	11	1	56	
Titles / Finals	0 / 0	0 / 0	0 / 0	0 / 1	0 / 0	0 / 0	0 / 1	
Overall win–loss	0–3	0–5	10–15	9–21	2–11	0–1	21–56	
Year-end ranking	153	184	100	79	177	1652	27%	

== WTA Tour finals ==
=== Doubles: 1 (1 runner-up) ===
Legend Grand Slam (0–0) WTA 1000 (0–0) WTA 500 (0–1) WTA 250 (0–0)	Finals by surface Hard (0–1) Clay (0–0) Grass (0–0)

Result	W–L	Date	Tournament	Tier	Surface	Partner	Opponents	Score
Loss	0–1	Jan 2022	Sydney International, Australia	WTA 500	Hard	(Hungary) Panna Udvardy	(Kazakhstan) Anna Danilina (Brazil) Beatriz Haddad Maia	6–4, 5–7, [8–10]

== WTA Challenger finals ==
=== Doubles: 2 (1 title, 1 runner-up) ===
Result	W–L	Date	Tournament	Surface	Partner	Opponents	Score
Loss	0–1	Apr 2022	Marbella Open, Spain	Clay	(Poland) Katarzyna Kawa	(Romania) Irina Bara (Georgia (country)) Ekaterine Gorgodze	4–6, 6–3, [6–10]
Win	1–1	May 2023	Firenze Open, Italy	Clay	(Estonia) Ingrid Neel	(United States) Asia Muhammad (Mexico) Giuliana Olmos	1–6, 6–2, [10–8]

== ITF Circuit finals ==
=== Singles: 5 (2 titles, 3 runner–ups) ===
Legend $25,000 tournaments (0–0) $10,000 tournaments (2–3)	Finals by surface Hard (1–2) Clay (1–1)

Result	W–L	Date	Tournament	Tier	Surface	Opponent	Score
Loss	0–1	Nov 2012	ITF Monastir, Tunisia	10,000	Hard	(Slovakia) Nikola Vajdová	3–6, 6–1, 3–6
Loss	0–2	Apr 2015	ITF Manama, Bahrain	10,000	Hard	(Oman) Fatma Al-Nabhani	4–6, 6–7^{(2–7)}
Loss	0–3	Sep 2015	ITF Engis, Belgium	10,000	Clay	(Philippines) Katharina Lehnert	3–6, 6–2, 1–6
Win	1–3	Oct 2015	ITF Sozopol, Bulgaria	10,000	Hard	(Bulgaria) Julia Terziyska	6–2, 7–6^{(7–1)}
Win	2–3	Jun 2016	ITF Breda, Netherlands	10,000	Clay	(Netherlands) Kelly Versteeg	6–2, 6–1

=== Doubles: 19 (10 titles, 9 runner–ups) ===
Legend $100,000 tournaments (0–1) $80,000 tournaments (1–0) $60,000 tournaments (0–2) $25,000 tournaments (6–4) $10/15,000 tournaments (3–2)	Finals by surface Hard (5–4) Clay (5–4) Grass (0–0) Carpet (0–1)

Result	W–L	Date	Tournament	Tier	Surface	Partner	Opponents	Score
Loss	0–1	Jun 2012	ITF Meppel, Netherlands	10,000	Clay	(Netherlands) Marrit Boonstra	(Belgium) Ysaline Bonaventure (Netherlands) Nicolette van Uitert	6–1, 4–6, [7–10]
Loss	0–2	Jan 2014	ITF Kaarst, Germany	10,000	Carpet	(Germany) Linda Prenkovic	(Ukraine) Olga Ianchuk (Slovenia) Nastja Kolar	5–7, 3–6
Loss	0–3	Aug 2015	Ladies Open Hechingen, Germany	25,000	Clay	(Philippines) Katharina Lehnert	(Venezuela) Andrea Gámiz (Ukraine) Anastasiya Vasylyeva	6–4, 6–7^{(4–7)}, [3–10]
Win	1–3	Oct 2015	ITF Sozopol, Bulgaria	10,000	Hard	(Bulgaria) Julia Terziyska	(Czech Republic) Lenka Kunčíková (Czech Republic) Karolína Stuchlá	6–3, 6–1
Win	2–3	Aug 2016	ITF Vienna, Austria	10,000	Clay	(Austria) Janina Toljan	(Czech Republic) Petra Krejsová (Czech Republic) Anna Slováková	6–3, 6–2
Loss	2–4	Aug 2016	Ladies Open Hechingen, Germany	25,000	Clay	(Austria) Pia König	(Germany) Nicola Geuer (Germany) Anna Zaja	3–6, 1–6
Win	3–4	Feb 2017	Trnava Indoor, Slovakia	15,000	Hard (i)	(Russia) Margarita Lazareva	(Slovakia) Sandra Jamrichová (Slovakia) Vivien Juhászová	4–6, 6–4, [10–7]
Win	4–4	May 2017	Wiesbaden Open, Germany	25,000	Clay	(Australia) Storm Sanders	(Latvia) Diāna Marcinkēviča (Switzerland) Rebeka Masarova	7–5, 5–7, [10–8]
Win	5–4	Jul 2018	ITF Torino, Italy	25,000	Clay	(Egypt) Sandra Samir	(Italy) Martina Caregaro (Italy) Federica Di Sarra	6–3, 6–2
Win	6–4	Jan 2019	ITF Kazan, Russia	25,000	Hard (i)	(Ukraine) Ganna Poznikhirenko	(Russia) Alena Fomina-Klotz (Russia) Ekaterina Yashina	6–4, 6–3
Loss	6–5	Mar 2019	ITF Moscow, Russia	25,000	Hard (i)	(Ukraine) Ganna Poznikhirenko	(Russia) Sofya Lansere (Kazakhstan) Elena Rybakina	6–1, 3–6, [4–10]
Win	7–5	Jun 2019	ITF Darmstadt, Germany	25,000	Clay	(Germany) Katharina Hobgarski	(Germany) Lena Lutzeier (Germany) Natalia Siedliska	6–7^{(4–7)}, 6–2, [10–4]
Win	8–5	Jul 2019	Astana Challenger, Kazakhstan	80,000	Hard	(Czech Republic) Marie Bouzková	(Russia) Vlada Koval (Russia) Kamilla Rakhimova	7–6^{(10–8)}, 6–1
Loss	8–6	Aug 2019	ITF Leipzig, Germany	25,000	Clay	(Kazakhstan) Anna Danilina	(Czech Republic) Petra Krejsová (Czech Republic) Jesika Malečková	6–4, 3–6, [6–10]
Win	9–6	Aug 2019	ITF Vienna, Austria	25,000	Clay	(Germany) Katharina Hobgarski	(Spain) Irene Burillo Escorihuela (Spain) Andrea Lázaro García	7–6^{(7–4)}, 6–4
Win	10–6	Sep 2019	ITF Roehampton, United Kingdom	25,000	Hard	(Germany) Katharina Hobgarski	(United Kingdom) Freya Christie (United States) Maria Sanchez	7–5, 1–6, [10–7]
Loss	10–7	Sep 2019	Caldas da Rainha Open, Portugal	60,000	Hard	(Kazakhstan) Anna Danilina	(France) Jessika Ponchet (Bulgaria) Isabella Shinikova	1–6, 3–6
Loss	10–8	Nov 2019	Nantes Open, France	60,000	Hard (i)	(Russia) Yana Sizikova	(Uzbekistan) Akgul Amanmuradova (Georgia (country)) Ekaterine Gorgodze	6–7^{(2–7)}, 3–6
Loss	10–9	Aug 2022	ITF Grodzisk Mazowiecki, Poland	100,000	Hard	(Poland) Katarzyna Kawa	(United Kingdom) Alicia Barnett (United Kingdom) Olivia Nicholls	1–6, 6–7^{(3–7)}
