= Gozal Ainitdinova =

Kazakhstani tennis player (born 1998)

Gozal Ainitdinova Гозаль Айнитдинова
- Country (sports): Kazakhstan
- Born: 22 August 1998 (age 27)
- Plays: Right (two-handed backhand)
- Prize money: $89,945

Singles
- Career record: 206–186
- Career titles: 2 ITF
- Highest ranking: No. 396 (23 April 2018)

Doubles
- Career record: 125–120
- Career titles: 5 ITF
- Highest ranking: No. 333 (6 March 2023)

Team competitions
- Last updated on: 20 May 2024.

Gozal Ainitdinova (Russian: Гозаль Нуритдиновна Айнитдинова; born 22 August 1998) is a Kazakhstani former professional tennis player.

Ainitdinova has a career-high WTA singles ranking of world No. 396, achieved on 23 April 2018 and a doubles ranking of No. 333, which she reached on 6 March 2023. In her career, she has won two singles titles and five doubles titles on the ITF Circuit.

In 2018, Ainitdinova was nominated for the Kazakhstan Fed Cup team for the first time.

== ITF Circuit finals ==
=== Singles: 8 (2 titles, 6 runner-ups) ===
Legend
W25 tournaments (0–1)
W10/15 tournaments (2–5)

Result	W–L	Date	Tournament	Tier	Surface	Opponent	Score
Loss	0–1	Oct 2016	ITF Shymkent, Kazakhstan	W10	Clay	(Russia) Ulyana Ayzatulina	5–7, 0–6
Loss	0–2	Oct 2016	ITF Shymkent, Kazakhstan	W10	Clay	(Kazakhstan) Kamila Kerimbayeva	0–6, 4–6
Loss	0–3	Jun 2017	ITF Namangan, Uzbekistan	W25	Hard	(Russia) Polina Monova	6–1, 1–6, 2–6
Win	1–3	Oct 2017	ITF Colombo, Sri Lanka	W15	Clay	(India) Pranjala Yadlapalli	7–5, 6–4
Loss	1–4	Apr 2018	ITF Shymkent, Kazakhstan	W15	Clay	(Russia) Varvara Flink	0–6, 6–2, 0–6
Loss	1–5	Jan 2019	ITF Monastir, Tunisia	W15	Hard	(Sweden) Mirjam Björklund	2–6, 5–7
Loss	1–6	Apr 2019	ITF Shymkent, Kazakhstan	W15	Clay	(Russia) Anastasia Zakharova	0–6, 0–6
Win	2–6	Jan 2020	ITF Monastir, Tunisia	W15	Hard	(Belarus) Yuliya Hatouka	6–2, 6–4

=== Doubles: 12 (5 titles, 7 runner-ups) ===
Legend
W40 tournaments (0–1)
W25 tournaments (1–1)
W15 tournaments (4–5)

Result	W–L	Date	Tournament	Tier	Surface	Partner	Opponents	Score
Loss	0–1	Mar 2019	ITF Sharm El Sheikh, Egypt	W15	Hard	(Russia) Ekaterina Kazionova	(Sweden) Jacqueline Cabaj Awad (Turkey) İpek Soylu	2–6, 4–6
Loss	0–2	Jan 2020	ITF Monastir, Tunisia	W15	Hard	(Kazakhstan) Yekaterina Dmitrichenko	(Belarus) Yuliya Hatouka (Slovakia) Tereza Mihalíková	4–6, 2–6
Win	1–2	Mar 2020	ITF Antalya, Turkey	W15	Clay	(Georgia (country)) Zoziya Kardava	(Colombia) María Herazo González (Colombia) Yuliana Lizarazo	6–7^{(4)}, 7–6^{(1)}, [12–10]
Win	2–2	Oct 2020	ITF Sharm El Sheikh, Egypt	W15	Hard	(Kazakhstan) Zhibek Kulambayeva	(Kazakhstan) Yekaterina Dmitrichenko (Kazakhstan) Kamila Kerimbayeva	6–1, 2–6, [12–10]
Win	3–2	Apr 2021	ITF Shymkent, Kazakhstan	W15	Clay	(Kazakhstan) Zhibek Kulambayeva	(Ukraine) Viktoriia Dema (Russia) Anna Ureke	6–2, 5–7, [10–7]
Win	4–2	May 2021	ITF Monastir, Tunisia	W15	Hard	(Belarus) Anna Kubareva	(United Kingdom) Sarah Beth Grey (United States) Dasha Ivanova	7–5, 6–2
Loss	4–3	Dec 2021	ITF Giza, Egypt	W15	Hard	(Russia) Anastasia Sukhotina	(Greece) Sapfo Sakellaridi (China) Youmi Zhuoma	6–7^{(4)}, 3–6
Win	5–3	Apr 2022	ITF Chiang Rai, Thailand	W25	Hard	Maria Timofeeva	(Japan) Momoko Kobori (Thailand) Luksika Kumkhum	2–6, 7–5, [10–4]
Loss	5–4	Oct 2022	ITF Hua Hin, Thailand	W25	Hard	Ekaterina Maklakova	(Thailand) Peangtarn Plipuech (Japan) Erika Sema	6–2, 6–7^{(0)}, [11–13]
Loss	5–5	Jan 2023	ITF Pune, India	W40	Hard	(Kazakhstan) Zhibek Kulambayeva	(India) Ankita Raina (India) Prarthana Thombare	6–4, 5–7, [8–10]
Loss	5–6	Aug 2023	ITF Nakhon Si Thammarat, Thailand	W15	Hard	(China) Yang Yidi	(Thailand) Anchisa Chanta (Thailand) Salakthip Ounmuang	6–7^{(6)}, 2–6
Loss	5–7	May 2024	ITF Estepona, Spain	W15	Hard	Elina Nepliy	(Sweden) Jacqueline Cabaj Awad (Luxembourg) Marie Weckerle	4–6, 4–6
