= Yekaterina Dmitrichenko =

Kazakhstani tennis player

- Country (sports): Kazakhstan
- Born: 16 October 2001 (age 25)
- Plays: Right-handed
- Prize money: $34,572

Singles
- Career record: 83–93
- Career titles: 1 ITF
- Highest ranking: No. 723 (9 September 2019)
- Current ranking: No. 875 (16 November 2026)

Doubles
- Career record: 64–70
- Career titles: 4 ITF
- Highest ranking: No. 527 (2 March 2020)
- Current ranking: No. 1406 (16 November 2026)
- Last updated on: 22 November 2026.

Yekaterina Dmitrichenko (born 16 October 2001) is a Kazakhstani tennis player.

Dmitrichenko has a career-high WTA ranking of 723 in singles, achieved on 9 September 2019. She also has a career-high WTA ranking of 527 in doubles, achieved on 2 March 2020. She has won five titles (four in doubles) on the ITF Women's World Tennis Tour.

Dmitrichenko made her WTA Tour main-draw debut at the 2021 Astana Open, after receiving a wildcard for the doubles competition.

== ITF Circuit finals ==
=== Singles: 1 (title) ===
Legend W25 tournaments W15 tournaments (1–0)	Finals by surface Hard (1–0)

Result	W–L	Date	Tournament	Tier	Surface	Opponent	Score
Win	1–0	Sep 2026	ITF Monastir, Tunisia	W15	Hard	(Italy) Matilde Mariani	6–3, 6–2

=== Doubles: 13 (4 titles, 9 runner-ups) ===
Legend W25 tournaments W15 tournaments	Finals by surface Hard (3–4) Clay (1–5)

Result	W–L	Date	Tournament	Tier	Surface	Partner	Opponents	Score
Win	1–0	Sep 2018	ITF Shymkent, Kazakhstan	W15	Clay	(Russia) Anna Iakovleva	(Uzbekistan) Yasmina Karimjanova (Uzbekistan) Sevil Yuldasheva	6–4, 6–3
Loss	1–1	Jun 2019	ITF Akko, Israel	W25	Hard	(Israel) Shelly Bereznyak	(Croatia) Silvia Njirić (Turkey) İpek Soylu	2–6, 0–6
Win	2–1	Jun 2019	ITF Netanya, Israel	W15	Hard	(Russia) Anastasia Zakharova	(Israel) Shelly Bereznyak (Israel) Lina Glushko	6–0, 6–4
Loss	2–2	Aug 2019	ITF Tabarka, Tunisia	W15	Clay	(Russia) Nina Rudiukova	(Spain) Noelia Bouzó Zanotti (Italy) Giulia Crescenzi	6–7^{(5)}, 3–6
Loss	2–3	Sep 2019	ITF Shymkent, Kazakhstan	W15	Clay	(Russia) Avelina Sayfetdinova	(Russia) Elina Avanesyan (Belarus) Viktoryia Kanapatskaya	3–6, 0–6
Loss	2–4	Oct 2019	Telavi Open, Georgia	W15	Clay	(Russia) Anna Ureke	(Romania) Oana Georgeta Simion (Czech Republic) Anna Sisková	1–6, 0–6
Loss	2–5	Jan 2020	ITF Monastir, Tunisia	W15	Hard	(Kazakhstan) Gozal Ainitdinova	(Belarus) Yuliya Hatouka (Slovakia) Tereza Mihalíková	4–6, 2–6
Loss	2–6	Oct 2020	ITF Sharm El-Sheik, Egypt	W15	Hard	(Kazakhstan) Kamila Kerimbayeva	(Kazakhstan) Gozal Ainitdinova (Kazakhstan) Zhibek Kulambayeva	1–6, 6–2, [10–12]
Loss	2–7	Nov 2021	ITF Cairo, Egypt	W15	Clay	(Germany) Antonia Schmidt	(China) Bai Zhuoxuan (Thailand) Punnin Kovapitukted	3–6, 6–7^{(1)}
Loss	2–8	Dec 2021	ITF Cairo, Egypt	W15	Clay	(Egypt) Sandra Samir	(Belarus) Aliona Falei (Russia) Anastasia Zolotareva	4–6, 2–6
Loss	2–9	Aug 2025	ITF Astana, Kazakhstan	W15	Hard	(Kazakhstan) Aruzhan Sagandykova	(Russia) Ekaterina Khayrutdinova (Belarus) Anna Kubareva	6–0, 6–7^{(5)}, [8–10]
Win	3–9	Sep 2026	ITF Monastir, Tunisia	W15	Hard	(United Kingdom) Savannah Dada-Mascoll	(Turkey) Doğa Türkmen (Canada) Alexandra Vagramov	6–4, 6–7^{(4)}, [10–8]
Win	4–9	Nov 2026	ITF Sharm El Sheikh, Egypt	W15	Hard	(Turkey) İrem Kurt	Polina Starkova; Sofiia Suslova	6–2, 6–4
