= 2018 President's Cup (tennis) =

- Date: 16–22 July
- Edition: 13th (ATP); 10th (ITF)
- Category: ATP Challenger Tour; ITF Women's Circuit
- Prize money: $125,000 (ATP) $80,000 (ITF)
- Surface: Hard
- Location: Astana, Kazakhstan

Champions

Men's singles
- (Austria) Sebastian Ofner

Women's singles
- (Georgia (country)) Ekaterine Gorgodze

Men's doubles
- (Russia) Mikhail Elgin / (Belarus) Yaraslav Shyla

Women's doubles
- (Turkey) Berfu Cengiz / (Kazakhstan) Anna Danilina
- President's Cup (tennis)

The 2018 President's Cup was a professional tennis tournament played on outdoor hard courts. It was the thirteenth (ATP) and tenth (ITF) editions of the tournament and was part of the 2018 ATP Challenger Tour and the 2018 ITF Women's Circuit. It took place in Astana, Kazakhstan, on 16–22 July 2018.

== Men's singles main draw entrants ==
=== Seeds ===
Country	Player	Rank^{1}	Seed
RUS	Mikhail Youzhny	102	1
KAZ	Alexander Bublik	141	2
AUT	Sebastian Ofner	143	3
JPN	Hiroki Moriya	213	4
BLR	Egor Gerasimov	217	5
KOR	Lee Duck-hee	233	6
RUS	Ivan Nedelko	242	7
TUR	Cem İlkel	245	8

- ^{1} Rankings are as of 2 July 2018.

=== Other entrants ===
The following players received wildcards into the singles main draw:

- (Kazakhstan) Sagadat Ayap
- (Uzbekistan) Farrukh Dustov
- (Kazakhstan) Timur Khabibulin
- (Kazakhstan) Aleksandr Nedovyesov

The following players received entry from the qualifying draw:

- (France) Hugo Grenier
- (Russia) Pavel Kotov
- (India) Saketh Myneni
- (Uzbekistan) Khumoyun Sultanov

The following players received entry as lucky losers:

- (India) Arjun Kadhe
- (Belarus) Dzmitry Zhyrmont

== Women's singles main draw entrants ==
=== Seeds ===
Country	Player	Rank^{1}	Seed
UZB	Sabina Sharipova	144	1
CZE	Marie Bouzková	167	2
SRB	Nina Stojanović	222	3
RUS	Olga Doroshina	250	4
GEO	Ekaterine Gorgodze	257	5
UZB	Nigina Abduraimova	284	6
RUS	Valeria Savinykh	289	7
JPN	Mai Minokoshi	293	8

- ^{1} Rankings as of 2 July 2018.

=== Other entrants ===
The following players received a wildcard into the singles main draw:

- (Kazakhstan) Anastasia Astakhova
- (Kazakhstan) Anna Danilina
- (Kazakhstan) Dariya Detkovskaya
- (Hong Kong) Ng Kwan-yau

The following players received entry from the qualifying draw:

- (Russia) Darya Astakhova
- (Russia) Anastasia Frolova
- (Serbia) Bojana Jovanovski Petrović
- (Russia) Ksenia Laskutova

== Champions ==
=== Men's singles ===
- (Austria) Sebastian Ofner def. (Germany) Daniel Brands, 7–6^{(7–5)}, 6–3

=== Women's singles ===
- (Georgia (country)) Ekaterine Gorgodze def. (Uzbekistan) Sabina Sharipova, 6–4, 6–1

=== Men's doubles ===
- (Russia) Mikhail Elgin / (Belarus) Yaraslav Shyla def. (India) Arjun Kadhe / (Kazakhstan) Denis Yevseyev, 7–5, 7–6^{(8–6)}

=== Women's doubles ===
- (Turkey) Berfu Cengiz / (Kazakhstan) Anna Danilina def. (Uzbekistan) Akgul Amanmuradova / (Georgia (country)) Ekaterine Gorgodze, 3–6, 6–3, [10–7]
