= 2026 SanLucar Ladies Open – Singles =

Singles
- 2026 SanLucar Ladies Open

Final
- Champion: (Georgia (country)) Ekaterine Gorgodze
- Runner-up: (Ukraine) Anastasiia Sobolieva
- Score: 6–0, 1–0 ret.

Events
Singles	Doubles
- Schönbusch Open

Nuria Brancaccio was the defending champion, but chose not to compete.

Ekaterine Gorgodze won the title, after Anastasiia Sobolieva retired while trailing 6–0, 1–0 in the final.

== Seeds ==
1. (Italy) Lucia Bronzetti (second round)
2. (Slovenia) Tamara Zidanšek (quarterfinals)
3. (Greece) Despina Papamichail (first round)
4. (Argentina) Julia Riera (quarterfinals)
5. (Serbia) Teodora Kostović (semifinals)
6. Julia Avdeeva (semifinals)
7. (Georgia (country)) Ekaterine Gorgodze (champion)
8. Darya Astakhova (second round)

== Draw ==
Key

- Q = Qualifier
- WC = Wild card
- LL = Lucky loser
- Alt = Alternate
- ITF = ITF entry
- PR = Protected ranking
- SR = Special ranking
- SE = Special exempt
- JE = Junior exempt
- JR = Junior Accelerator Programme entrant
- CO = College Accelerator Programme entrant
- NG = Next Gen Accelerator Program entrant
- w/o = Walkover
- r = Retired
- d = Defaulted

=== Finals ===
Semifinals
(Ukraine) Anastasiia Sobolieva	6	7^{7}
6	Julia Avdeeva	3	6^{4}
7	(Georgia (country)) Ekaterine Gorgodze	7^{7}	6
5	(Serbia) Teodora Kostović	6^{4}	1

Final
(Ukraine) Anastasiia Sobolieva	0	0^{r}
7	(Georgia (country)) Ekaterine Gorgodze	6	1

=== Top half ===
First round
1	(Italy) L Bronzetti	6	6
SR	(Spain) G García Pérez	3	4
(Ukraine) A Sobolieva	6	6
(Germany) E Bennemann	2	3
(Slovenia) D Jakupović	7^{7}	0	7^{7}
(United States) V Wolff	6^{5}	6	6^{5}
(China) X Yao	4	5
8	D Astakhova	6	7
3	(Greece) D Papamichail	4	2
(Argentina) M Capurro Taborda	6	6
Q	(Germany) S Triquart	1	1
Q	(Turkey) B Cengiz	6	6
(Germany) M Hodzic	4	7^{7}	6^{1}
Q	(Bulgaria) L Encheva	6	6^{4}	7^{7}
Q	(Croatia) T Lukas	4	3
6	J Avdeeva	6	6

Second round
1	(Italy) L Bronzetti	4	5
(Ukraine) A Sobolieva	6	7
(Slovenia) D Jakupović	7	6
8	D Astakhova	5	2
(Argentina) M Capurro Taborda	1	4
Q	(Turkey) B Cengiz	6	6
Q	(Bulgaria) L Encheva	4^{r}
6	J Avdeeva	5

Quarterfinals
(Ukraine) A Sobolieva	6	6
(Slovenia) D Jakupović	4	4
Q	(Turkey) B Cengiz	4	2
6	J Avdeeva	6	6

Semifinals
(Ukraine) A Sobolieva	6	7^{7}
6	J Avdeeva	3	6^{4}

=== Bottom half ===
First round
7	(Georgia (country)) E Gorgodze	1	6	6
(Slovakia) M Pohánková	6	0	1
WC	(Germany) V Steiner	6	7
Q	(Greece) S Sakellaridi	0	5
Q	(Italy) M Trevisan	6	4	6
Q	(Switzerland) K Tsygourova	2	6	4
WC	(Germany) E Seibold	6	2	0
4	(Argentina) J Riera	4	6	6
5	(Serbia) T Kostović	6	6
(Germany) T Brockmann	0	4
WC	(Germany) J Niemeier	1	6	6
(Italy) A Mazzola	6	3	3
Q	(Romania) A Prisăcariu	7	3	2
(Liechtenstein) K von Deichmann	5	6	6
WC	(Germany) N Schunk	5	3
2	(Slovenia) T Zidanšek	7	6

Second round
7	(Georgia (country)) E Gorgodze	6	6
WC	(Germany) V Steiner	1	2
Q	(Italy) M Trevisan	4	1
4	(Argentina) J Riera	6	6
5	(Serbia) T Kostović	4	7	6
WC	(Germany) J Niemeier	6	5	2
(Liechtenstein) K von Deichmann
2	(Slovenia) T Zidanšek	w/o

Quarterfinals
7	(Georgia (country)) E Gorgodze	7	6
4	(Argentina) J Riera	5	4
5	(Serbia) T Kostović	6	6
2	(Slovenia) T Zidanšek	3	0

Semifinals
7	(Georgia (country)) E Gorgodze	7^{7}	6
5	(Serbia) T Kostović	6^{4}	1
