= 2026 SanLucar Ladies Open =

Tennis tournament

- Date: 6–12 July 2025
- Edition: 15th
- Category: ITF Women's World Tennis Tour
- Draw: 32S / 16D
- Prize money: $100,000
- Surface: Clay / Outdoor
- Location: Aschaffenburg, Germany
- Venue: TC Schönbusch Aschaffenburg

2025 Champions

Singles
- (Italy) Nuria Brancaccio

Doubles
- (United States) Rasheeda McAdoo / (Kenya) Angella Okutoyi
- Schönbusch Open

The 2026 SanLucar Ladies Open is a professional tennis tournament play on outdoor clay courts. It is the fifteenth edition of the tournament, which was part of the 2026 ITF Women's World Tennis Tour. It is taking place in Aschaffenburg, Germany, between 6 and 12 July 2026.

== Champions ==
=== Singles ===
- (Georgia (country)) Ekaterine Gorgodze vs. (Ukraine) Anastasiia Sobolieva 6–0, 1–0 ret.

=== Doubles ===
- (United States) Rasheeda McAdoo / (Kenya) Angella Okutoyi vs. (Serbia) Elena Milovanović / (Slovenia) Kristina Novak 6–3, 6–3

== Singles main draw entrants ==
=== Seeds ===
Country	Player	Rank	Seed
ITA	Lucia Bronzetti	125	1
SLO	Tamara Zidanšek	131	2
GRE	Despina Papamichail	169	3
ARG	Julia Riera	182	4
SRB	Teodora Kostović	184	5
	Julia Avdeeva	191	6
GEO	Ekaterine Gorgodze	217	7
	Darya Astakhova	234	8

- Rankings are as of 29 June 2026.

=== Other entrants ===
The following players received wildcards into the singles main draw:

- (Germany) Jule Niemeier
- (Germany) Nastasja Schunk
- (Germany) Emily Seibold
- (Germany) Valentina Steiner

The following player received entry using a special ranking:

- (Spain) Georgina García Pérez

The following players received entry from the qualifying draw:

- (Turkey) Berfu Cengiz
- (Bulgaria) Lidia Encheva
- (Croatia) Tena Lukas
- (Romania) Andreea Prisăcariu
- (Greece) Sapfo Sakellaridi
- (Switzerland) Katerina Tsygourova
- (Italy) Martina Trevisan
- (Germany) Sophie Triquart
