= 2023 Wimbledon Championships – Women's singles =

Tennis championship

Ladies' singles
- 2023 Wimbledon Championships

Final
- Champion: (Czech Republic) Markéta Vondroušová
- Runner-up: (Tunisia) Ons Jabeur
- Score: 6–4, 6–4

Details
- Draw: 128 (16 Q / 8 WC)
- Seeds: 32

Events
| Singles | men | women | | boys | girls |
| Doubles | men | women | mixed | boys | girls |
| WC Singles | men | women | quad |
| WC Doubles | men | women | quad |
| 14&U Singles | boys | girls |
| Legends | men | women | mixed |
- Wimbledon Championships

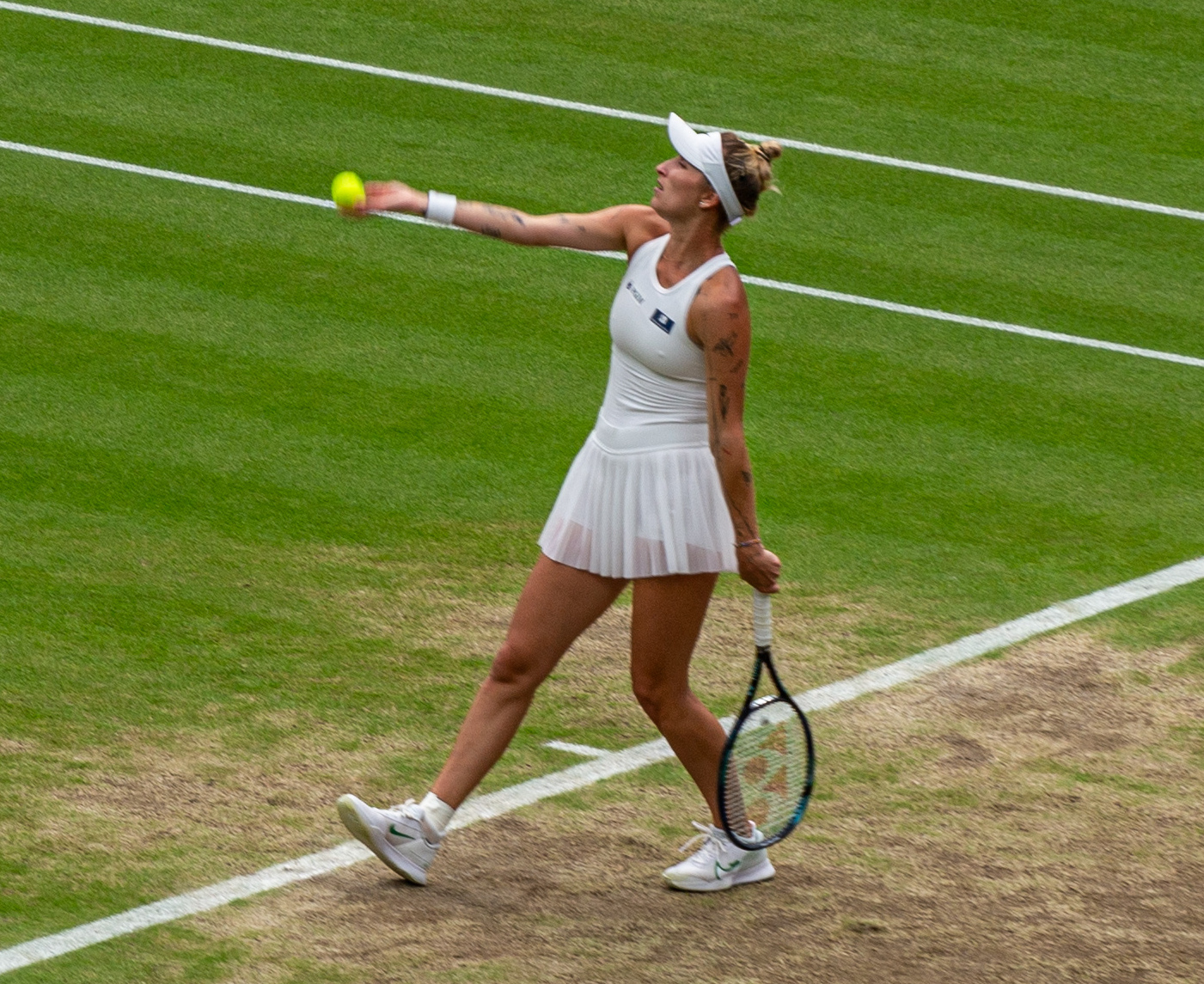
Markéta Vondroušová (pictured in semifinals) won the title.

Markéta Vondroušová defeated Ons Jabeur in the final, 6–4, 6–4 to win the ladies' singles tennis title at the 2023 Wimbledon Championships. It was her first major title, second career WTA Tour title and her first title overall since 2017. Vondroušová was the first unseeded woman to win the Wimbledon title, the first to contest the final since Billie Jean King in 1963, and at world No. 42 was the lowest-ranked champion since the WTA rankings were established in 1975. By winning the title, Vondroušová made her debut in the top ten of the WTA rankings.

Iga Świątek and Aryna Sabalenka were in contention for the world No. 1 singles ranking. Świątek retained the No. 1 ranking after Sabalenka lost in the semifinals.

Elena Rybakina was the defending champion, but lost in the quarterfinals to Jabeur in a rematch of the previous year's final. Her loss guaranteed a first-time Wimbledon champion for the sixth straight edition.

Elina Svitolina was the first wildcard to reach the semifinals since Sabine Lisicki in 2011. The match between Vondroušová and Svitolina was the first semifinal at Wimbledon in the Open Era between two unseeded players. For the first Wimbledon since 2009 and the first major overall since the 2013 French Open, the top four seeds (Świątek, Sabalenka, Rybakina, and Jessica Pegula) progressed to the quarterfinals.

The second-round match between Ekaterina Alexandrova and Madison Brengle was the first triple-tiebreak women's match in the Open Era at Wimbledon, and the fourth overall in Grand Slam history. The third-round match between Lesia Tsurenko and Ana Bogdan was completed via a deciding set tiebreak that totaled 38 points, the longest women's singles tiebreak in major history. (This record was broken at the following year's Australian Open when Anna Blinkova defeated Rybakina in a 42 point long tiebreak.)

This tournament marked the first Wimbledon appearance of future champion Linda Nosková, who lost in the first round to Dalma Gálfi, and the final professional appearance of former world No. 2 Anett Kontaveit, who lost in the second round to Marie Bouzková.

== Seeds ==
1. (Poland) Iga Świątek (quarterfinals)
2. Aryna Sabalenka (semifinals)
3. (Kazakhstan) Elena Rybakina (quarterfinals)
4. (United States) Jessica Pegula (quarterfinals)
5. (France) Caroline Garcia (third round)
6. (Tunisia) Ons Jabeur (final)
7. (United States) Coco Gauff (first round)
8. (Greece) Maria Sakkari (first round)
9. (Czech Republic) Petra Kvitová (fourth round)
10. (Czech Republic) Barbora Krejčíková (second round, retired)
11. Daria Kasatkina (third round)
12. Veronika Kudermetova (second round)
13. (Brazil) Beatriz Haddad Maia (fourth round, retired)
14. (Switzerland) Belinda Bencic (fourth round)
15. Liudmila Samsonova (first round)
16. (Czech Republic) Karolína Muchová (first round)

17. (Latvia) Jeļena Ostapenko (second round)
18. (Czech Republic) Karolína Plíšková (first round)
19. Victoria Azarenka (fourth round)
20. (Croatia) Donna Vekić (third round)
21. Ekaterina Alexandrova (fourth round)
22. Anastasia Potapova (third round)
23. (Poland) Magda Linette (third round)
24. (China) Zheng Qinwen (first round)
25. (United States) Madison Keys (quarterfinals)
26. (Ukraine) Anhelina Kalinina (second round)
27. (United States) Bernarda Pera (first round)
28. (Belgium) Elise Mertens (second round)
29. (Romania) Irina-Camelia Begu (second round)
30. (Croatia) Petra Martić (third round)
31. (Egypt) Mayar Sherif (first round)
32. (Czech Republic) Marie Bouzková (fourth round)

Click on the seed number of a player to go to their draw section.

== Draw ==
Key

- Q = Qualifier
- WC = Wild card
- LL = Lucky loser
- Alt = Alternate
- ITF = ITF entry
- PR = Protected ranking
- SR = Special ranking
- SE = Special exempt
- JE = Junior exempt
- JR = Junior Accelerator Programme entrant
- CO = College Accelerator Programme entrant
- NG = Next Gen Accelerator Program entrant
- w/o = Walkover
- r = Retired
- d = Defaulted

=== Finals ===
Quarterfinals
1 | (Poland) Iga Świątek | 5 | 7^{7} | 2
WC | (Ukraine) Elina Svitolina | 7 | 6^{5} | 6
4 | (United States) Jessica Pegula | 4 | 6 | 4
(Czech Republic) Markéta Vondroušová | 6 | 2 | 6
6 | (Tunisia) Ons Jabeur | 6^{5} | 6 | 6
3 | (Kazakhstan) Elena Rybakina | 7^{7} | 4 | 1
25 | (United States) Madison Keys | 2 | 4
2 | Aryna Sabalenka | 6 | 6

Semifinals
WC | (Ukraine) Elina Svitolina | 3 | 3
(Czech Republic) Markéta Vondroušová | 6 | 6
6 | (Tunisia) Ons Jabeur | 6^{5} | 6 | 6
2 | Aryna Sabalenka | 7^{7} | 4 | 3

Final
(Czech Republic) Markéta Vondroušová | 6 | 6
6 | (Tunisia) Ons Jabeur | 4 | 4

=== Top half ===
==== Section 1 ====
First round
1 | (Poland) I Świątek | 6 | 6
(China) L Zhu | 1 | 3
(Italy) M Trevisan | 3 | 1
PR | (Spain) S Sorribes Tormo | 6 | 6
(France) D Parry | 6^{4} | 6 | 6
WC | (United Kingdom) H Dart | 7^{7} | 0 | 4
(Czech Republic) L Fruhvirtová | 5 | 7^{7} | 1^{r}
30 | (Croatia) P Martić | 7 | 6^{5} | 4
23 | (Poland) M Linette | 6 | 6
(Switzerland) J Teichmann | 3 | 2
PR | (Czech Republic) B Strýcová | 6 | 7
(Belgium) M Zanevska | 1 | 5
(United States) D Collins | 6 | 6
(Austria) J Grabher | 4 | 4
WC | (United Kingdom) K Swan | 5 | 2
14 | (Switzerland) B Bencic | 7 | 6

Second round
1 | (Poland) I Świątek | 6 | 6
PR | (Spain) S Sorribes Tormo | 2 | 0
(France) D Parry | 6 | 3 | 3
30 | (Croatia) P Martić | 4 | 6 | 6
23 | (Poland) M Linette | 6 | 6^{6} | 6
PR | (Czech Republic) B Strýcová | 4 | 7^{8} | 3
(United States) D Collins | 6 | 4 | 6^{2}
14 | (Switzerland) B Bencic | 3 | 6 | 7^{10}

Third round
1 | (Poland) I Świątek | 6 | 7
30 | (Croatia) P Martić | 2 | 5
23 | (Poland) M Linette | 3 | 1
14 | (Switzerland) B Bencic | 6 | 6

Fourth round
1 | (Poland) I Świątek | 6^{4} | 7^{7} | 6
14 | (Switzerland) B Bencic | 7^{7} | 6^{2} | 3

==== Section 2 ====
First round
11 | D Kasatkina | 6 | 6
(United States) C Dolehide | 1 | 4
WC | (United Kingdom) J Burrage | 6 | 6
(United States) C McNally | 1 | 3
(Argentina) N Podoroska | 3 | 7^{7} | 6
(Czech Republic) T Martincová | 6 | 6^{5} | 4
Q | (China) Y Yuan | 4 | 7 | 4
19 | V Azarenka | 6 | 5 | 6
28 | (Belgium) E Mertens | 7^{7} | 6
Q | (Slovakia) V Hrunčáková | 6^{2} | 2
WC | (United States) V Williams | 4 | 3
WC | (Ukraine) E Svitolina | 6 | 6
Q | (Australia) S Hunter | 3 | 1
(China) Xin Wang | 6 | 6
Q | (United States) S Kenin | 6 | 4 | 6
7 | (United States) C Gauff | 4 | 6 | 2

Second round
11 | D Kasatkina | 6 | 6
WC | (United Kingdom) J Burrage | 0 | 2
(Argentina) N Podoroska | 3 | 0
19 | V Azarenka | 6 | 6
28 | (Belgium) E Mertens | 1 | 6 | 1
WC | (Ukraine) E Svitolina | 6 | 1 | 6
(China) Xin Wang | 4 | 3
Q | (United States) S Kenin | 6 | 6

Third round
11 | D Kasatkina | 2 | 4
19 | V Azarenka | 6 | 6
WC | (Ukraine) E Svitolina | 7^{7} | 6
Q | (United States) S Kenin | 6^{3} | 2

Fourth round
19 | V Azarenka | 6 | 4 | 6^{9}
WC | (Ukraine) E Svitolina | 2 | 6 | 7^{11}

==== Section 3 ====
First round
4 | (United States) J Pegula | 6 | 6^{8} | 6
(United States) L Davis | 2 | 7^{10} | 3
(Spain) C Bucșa | 6 | 4 | 7^{11}
K Rakhimova | 3 | 6 | 6^{9}
(Colombia) C Osorio | 3 | 4
(Italy) E Cocciaretto | 6 | 6
(Spain) R Masarova | 7 | 3 | 7^{10}
31 | (Egypt) M Sherif | 5 | 6 | 6^{6}
24 | (China) Q Zheng | 3 | 5
(Czech Republic) K Siniaková | 6 | 7
(Ukraine) L Tsurenko | 6 | 3 | 6
(United States) C Liu | 3 | 6 | 4
(United States) A Parks | 6 | 6
(Germany) A-L Friedsam | 4 | 3
(Romania) A Bogdan | 7^{7} | 7^{7}
15 | L Samsonova | 6^{1} | 6^{4}

Second round
4 | (United States) J Pegula | 6 | 6
(Spain) C Bucșa | 1 | 4
(Italy) E Cocciaretto | 6 | 6
(Spain) R Masarova | 3 | 1
(Czech Republic) K Siniaková | 4 | 1
(Ukraine) L Tsurenko | 6 | 6
(United States) A Parks | 6 | 3 | 2
(Romania) A Bogdan | 1 | 6 | 6

Third round
4 | (United States) J Pegula | 6 | 6
(Italy) E Cocciaretto | 4 | 0
(Ukraine) L Tsurenko | 4 | 6 | 7^{20}
(Romania) A Bogdan | 6 | 3 | 6^{18}

Fourth round
4 | (United States) J Pegula | 6 | 6
(Ukraine) L Tsurenko | 1 | 3

==== Section 4 ====
First round
12 | V Kudermetova | 7^{7} | 6
(Estonia) K Kanepi | 6^{4} | 4
(Czech Republic) M Vondroušová | 6 | 7
(United States) P Stearns | 2 | 5
(United States) S Stephens | 6 | 6
(Sweden) R Peterson | 2 | 3
(China) S Zhang | 2 | 3
20 | (Croatia) D Vekić | 6 | 6
32 | (Czech Republic) M Bouzková | 6 | 6
Q | (Switzerland) S Waltert | 1 | 4
(Estonia) A Kontaveit | 6 | 6
Q | (Italy) L Stefanini | 4 | 4
(Ukraine) K Baindl | 4 | 6 | 4
(Canada) L Fernandez | 6 | 4 | 6
(United States) K Volynets | 4 | 3
5 | (France) C Garcia | 6 | 6

Second round
12 | V Kudermetova | 3 | 3
(Czech Republic) M Vondroušová | 6 | 6
(United States) S Stephens | 6 | 5 | 4
20 | (Croatia) D Vekić | 4 | 7 | 6
32 | (Czech Republic) M Bouzková | 6 | 6
(Estonia) A Kontaveit | 1 | 2
(Canada) L Fernandez | 6 | 4 | 6^{6}
5 | (France) C Garcia | 3 | 6 | 7^{10}

Third round
(Czech Republic) M Vondroušová | 6 | 7
20 | (Croatia) D Vekić | 1 | 5
32 | (Czech Republic) M Bouzková | 7^{7} | 4 | 7
5 | (France) C Garcia | 6^{0} | 6 | 5

Fourth round
(Czech Republic) M Vondroušová | 2 | 6 | 6
32 | (Czech Republic) M Bouzková | 6 | 4 | 3

=== Bottom half ===
==== Section 5 ====
First round
6 | (Tunisia) O Jabeur | 6 | 6
(Poland) M Fręch | 3 | 3
(Belgium) Y Bonaventure | 6^{0} | 1
Q | (China) Z Bai | 7^{7} | 6
(Hungary) A Bondár | 3 | 6 | 2
(Canada) B Andreescu | 6 | 3 | 6
Q | (Spain) J Bouzas Maneiro | 4 | 3
26 | (Ukraine) A Kalinina | 6 | 6
18 | (Czech Republic) Ka Plíšková | 2 | 3
Q | (Serbia) N Stevanović | 6 | 6
Q | (Canada) C Zhao | 6 | 4 | 2
LL | (Germany) T Korpatsch | 1 | 6 | 6
A Sasnovich | 6 | 6
(Spain) N Párrizas Díaz | 2 | 1
(Italy) J Paolini | 4 | 7^{7} | 1
9 | (Czech Republic) P Kvitová | 6 | 6^{5} | 6

Second round
6 | (Tunisia) O Jabeur | 6 | 6
Q | (China) Z Bai | 1 | 1
(Canada) B Andreescu | 6 | 4 | 7^{10}
26 | (Ukraine) A Kalinina | 2 | 6 | 6^{7}
Q | (Serbia) N Stevanović | 7 | 7
LL | (Germany) T Korpatsch | 5 | 5
A Sasnovich | 2 | 2
9 | (Czech Republic) P Kvitová | 6 | 6

Third round
6 | (Tunisia) O Jabeur | 3 | 6 | 6
(Canada) B Andreescu | 6 | 3 | 4
Q | (Serbia) N Stevanović | 3 | 5
9 | (Czech Republic) P Kvitová | 6 | 7

Fourth round
6 | (Tunisia) O Jabeur | 6 | 6
9 | (Czech Republic) P Kvitová | 0 | 3

==== Section 6 ====
First round
13 | (Brazil) B Haddad Maia | 3 | 6 | 6
(Kazakhstan) Y Putintseva | 6 | 0 | 4
PR | (Romania) J Cristian | 6 | 6
(Italy) L Bronzetti | 3 | 4
(Romania) S Cîrstea | 6 | 2 | 6
(Germany) T Maria | 1 | 6 | 3
Q | (Belgium) G Minnen | 1 | 2
17 | (Latvia) J Ostapenko | 6 | 6
27 | (United States) B Pera | 7^{7} | 3 | 3
(Bulgaria) V Tomova | 6^{3} | 6 | 6
WC | (United Kingdom) K Boulter | 7^{7} | 6
PR | (Australia) D Saville | 6^{4} | 2
LL | (Japan) N Hibino | 2 | 2
(France) A Cornet | 6 | 6
(United States) S Rogers | 6 | 1 | 2
3 | (Kazakhstan) E Rybakina | 4 | 6 | 6

Second round
13 | (Brazil) B Haddad Maia | 4 | 6 | 6
PR | (Romania) J Cristian | 6 | 2 | 4
(Romania) S Cîrstea | 4 | 7^{8} | 6
17 | (Latvia) J Ostapenko | 6 | 6^{6} | 4
(Bulgaria) V Tomova | 0 | 6 | 3
WC | (United Kingdom) K Boulter | 6 | 3 | 6
(France) A Cornet | 2 | 6^{2}
3 | (Kazakhstan) E Rybakina | 6 | 7^{7}

Third round
13 | (Brazil) B Haddad Maia | 6 | 6
(Romania) S Cîrstea | 2 | 2
WC | (United Kingdom) K Boulter | 1 | 1
3 | (Kazakhstan) E Rybakina | 6 | 6

Fourth round
13 | (Brazil) B Haddad Maia | 1^{r}
3 | (Kazakhstan) E Rybakina | 4

==== Section 7 ====
First round
8 | (Greece) M Sakkari | 6 | 5 | 2
(Ukraine) M Kostyuk | 0 | 7 | 6
(United States) A Riske-Amritraj | 3 | 3
(Spain) P Badosa | 6 | 6
Q | (Switzerland) V Golubic | 6 | 7^{7}
(Slovakia) AK Schmiedlová | 3 | 6^{4}
WC | (United Kingdom) S Kartal | 0 | 3
25 | (United States) M Keys | 6 | 6
22 | A Potapova | 6 | 6
Q | (Switzerland) C Naef | 3 | 3
Q | (Slovenia) K Juvan | 6 | 6
PR | M Betova | 0 | 3
Q | M Andreeva | 6 | 3 | 7
(China) Xiy Wang | 4 | 6 | 5
WC | (United Kingdom) H Watson | 2 | 5
10 | (Czech Republic) B Krejčíková | 6 | 7

Second round
(Ukraine) M Kostyuk | 6 | 1
(Spain) P Badosa | 2 | 0^{r}
Q | (Switzerland) V Golubic | 5 | 3
25 | (United States) M Keys | 7 | 6
22 | A Potapova | 6 | 7
Q | (Slovenia) K Juvan | 3 | 5
Q | M Andreeva | 6 | 4
10 | (Czech Republic) B Krejčíková | 3 | 0^{r}

Third round
(Ukraine) M Kostyuk | 4 | 1
25 | (United States) M Keys | 6 | 6
22 | A Potapova | 2 | 5
Q | M Andreeva | 6 | 7

Fourth round
25 | (United States) M Keys | 3 | 7^{7} | 6
Q | M Andreeva | 6 | 6^{4} | 2

==== Section 8 ====
First round
16 | (Czech Republic) K Muchová | 4 | 7 | 1
(Germany) J Niemeier | 6 | 5 | 6
(Czech Republic) L Nosková | 7^{8} | 2 | 2
(Hungary) D Gálfi | 6^{6} | 6 | 6
(United States) M Brengle | 6 | 6
(Italy) S Errani | 3 | 1
(United States) E Navarro | 4 | 3
21 | E Alexandrova | 6 | 6
29 | (Romania) I-C Begu | 6 | 3 | 6
(Canada) R Marino | 2 | 6 | 2
Q | (Belgium) Y Wickmayer | 2 | 6 | 3
A Blinkova | 6 | 4 | 6
(France) V Gracheva | 6 | 6
(Italy) C Giorgi | 2 | 4
(Hungary) P Udvardy | 3 | 1
2 | A Sabalenka | 6 | 6

Second round
(Germany) J Niemeier | 6 | 6^{5} | 1
(Hungary) D Gálfi | 4 | 7^{7} | 6
(United States) M Brengle | 7^{7} | 6^{5} | 6^{7}
21 | E Alexandrova | 6^{4} | 7^{7} | 7^{10}
29 | (Romania) I-C Begu | 5 | 3
A Blinkova | 7 | 6
(France) V Gracheva | 6 | 5 | 2
2 | A Sabalenka | 2 | 7 | 6

Third round
(Hungary) D Gálfi | 0 | 4
21 | E Alexandrova | 6 | 6
A Blinkova | 2 | 3
2 | A Sabalenka | 6 | 6

Fourth round
21 | E Alexandrova | 4 | 0
2 | A Sabalenka | 6 | 6

== Championship match statistics ==
| Category | (Czech Republic) Vondroušová | (Tunisia) Jabeur |
|---|---|---|
| 1st serve % | 41/65 (63%) | 29/60 (48%) |
| 1st serve points won | 25 of 41 = 61% | 14 of 29 = 48% |
| 2nd serve points won | 11 of 24 = 46% | 14 of 31 = 45% |
| Total service points won | 36 of 65 = 55.38% | 28 of 60 = 46.67% |
| Aces | 0 | 1 |
| Double faults | 4 | 0 |
| Winners | 10 | 25 |
| Unforced errors | 13 | 31 |
| Net points won | 10 of 14 = 71% | 12 of 17 = 71% |
| Break points converted | 6 of 7 = 86% | 4 of 10 = 40% |
| Return points won | 32 of 60 = 53% | 29 of 65 = 45% |
| Total points won | 68 | 57 |

== Seeded players ==
The following are the seeded players. Seedings are based on WTA rankings as of 26 June 2023. Rankings and points before are as of 3 July 2023.

No ranking points were awarded for the 2022 tournament due to the ban on Russian and Belarusian players. However, because the tournament takes place one week later this year, players are defending points from tournaments that took place during the week of 11 July 2022 (Lausanne and Budapest). Players who are not defending any points from those tournaments will have their 16th best result (shown in brackets in the table below) replaced with their points from the 2023 Wimbledon Championships.

| Seed | Rank | Player | Points before | Points dropping (or 16th best result) | Points earned | Points after | Status |
|---|---|---|---|---|---|---|---|
| 1 | 1 | (Poland) Iga Świątek | 8,990 | (105) | 430 | 9,315 | Quarterfinals lost to (Ukraine) Elina Svitolina [WC] |
| 2 | 2 | (Belarus) Aryna Sabalenka | 8,066 | (1) | 780 | 8,845 | Semifinals lost to (Tunisia) Ons Jabeur [6] |
| 3 | 3 | (Kazakhstan) Elena Rybakina | 5,090 | (55) | 430 | 5,465 | Quarterfinals lost to (Tunisia) Ons Jabeur [6] |
| 4 | 4 | (United States) Jessica Pegula | 4,995 | (30) | 430 | 5,395 | Quarterfinals lost to (Czech Republic) Markéta Vondroušová |
| 5 | 5 | (France) Caroline Garcia | 4,845 | 110^{†} | 130 | 4,865 | Third round lost to (Czech Republic) Marie Bouzková [32] |
| 6 | 6 | (Tunisia) Ons Jabeur | 3,547 | (1) | 1,300 | 4,846 | Runner-up, lost to (Czech Republic) Markéta Vondroušová |
| 7 | 7 | (United States) Coco Gauff | 3,435 | (55) | 10 | 3,390 | First round lost to (United States) Sofia Kenin [Q] |
| 8 | 8 | (Greece) Maria Sakkari | 3,301 | (1) | 10 | 3,310 | First round lost to (Ukraine) Marta Kostyuk |
| 9 | 9 | (Czech Republic) Petra Kvitová | 3,101 | (0) | 240 | 3,341 | Fourth round lost to (Tunisia) Ons Jabeur [6] |
| 10 | 11 | (Czech Republic) Barbora Krejčíková | 2,830 | (30) | 70 | 2,870 | Second round retired against Mirra Andreeva [Q] |
| 11 | 10 | Daria Kasatkina | 2,935 | (55) | 130 | 3,010 | Third round lost to Victoria Azarenka [19] |
| 12 | 12 | Veronika Kudermetova | 2,600 | (100) | 70 | 2,570 | Second round lost to (Czech Republic) Markéta Vondroušová |
| 13 | 13 | (Brazil) Beatriz Haddad Maia | 2,560 | (55) | 240 | 2,745 | Fourth round retired against (Kazakhstan) Elena Rybakina [3] |
| 14 | 14 | (Switzerland) Belinda Bencic | 2,380 | 60^{†} | 240 | 2,560 | Fourth round lost to (Poland) Iga Świątek [1] |
| 15 | 15 | Liudmila Samsonova | 2,360 | (55) | 10 | 2,315 | First round lost to (Romania) Ana Bogdan |
| 16 | 16 | (Czech Republic) Karolína Muchová | 2,294 | (0) | 10 | 2,304 | First round lost to (Germany) Jule Niemeier |
| 17 | 17 | (Latvia) Jeļena Ostapenko | 2,150 | (55) | 70 | 2,165 | Second round lost to (Romania) Sorana Cîrstea |
| 18 | 19 | (Czech Republic) Karolína Plíšková | 2,055 | (25) | 10 | 2,040 | First round lost to (Serbia) Natalija Stevanović [Q] |
| 19 | 20 | Victoria Azarenka | 1,996 | (1) | 240 | 2,235 | Fourth round lost to (Ukraine) Elina Svitolina [WC] |
| 20 | 21 | (Croatia) Donna Vekić | 1,975 | (30) | 130 | 2,075 | Third round lost to (Czech Republic) Markéta Vondroušová |
| 21 | 22 | Ekaterina Alexandrova | 1,915 | (30) | 240 | 2,125 | Fourth round lost to Aryna Sabalenka [2] |
| 22 | 23 | Anastasia Potapova | 1,845 | 110^{†} | 130 | 1,865 | Third round lost to Mirra Andreeva [Q] |
| 23 | 24 | (Poland) Magda Linette | 1,765 | (60) | 130 | 1,835 | Third round lost to (Switzerland) Belinda Bencic [14] |
| 24 | 25 | (China) Zheng Qinwen | 1,669 | (1) | 10 | 1,678 | First round lost to (Czech Republic) Kateřina Siniaková |
| 25 | 18 | (United States) Madison Keys | 2,106 | (1) | 430 | 2,535 | Quarterfinals lost to Aryna Sabalenka [2] |
| 26 | 26 | (Ukraine) Anhelina Kalinina | 1,527 | (30) | 70 | 1,567 | Second round lost to (Canada) Bianca Andreescu |
| 27 | 27 | (United States) Bernarda Pera | 1,519 | 298^{†} | 10 | 1,231 | First round lost to (Bulgaria) Viktoriya Tomova |
| 28 | 28 | (Belgium) Elise Mertens | 1,424 | (15) | 70 | 1,479 | Second round lost to (Ukraine) Elina Svitolina [WC] |
| 29 | 30 | (Romania) Irina-Camelia Begu | 1,342 | 30^{†} | 70 | 1,382 | Second round lost to Anna Blinkova |
| 30 | 29 | (Croatia) Petra Martić | 1,418 | 280^{†} | 130 | 1,268 | Third round lost to (Poland) Iga Świątek [1] |
| 31 | 31 | (Egypt) Mayar Sherif | 1,266 | (30) | 10 | 1,246 | First round lost to (Spain) Rebeka Masarova |
| 32 | 33 | (Czech Republic) Marie Bouzková | 1,258 | (18) | 240 | 1,480 | Fourth round lost to (Czech Republic) Markéta Vondroušová |

† The player is defending points from Lausanne or Budapest.

== Other entry information ==
=== Wild cards ===
- (United Kingdom) Katie Boulter
- (United Kingdom) Jodie Burrage
- (United Kingdom) Harriet Dart
- (United Kingdom) Sonay Kartal
- (Ukraine) Elina Svitolina
- (United Kingdom) Katie Swan
- (United Kingdom) Heather Watson
- (United States) Venus Williams

=== Protected ranking ===
- (Czech Republic) Barbora Strýcová (39)
- (Australia) Daria Saville (54)
- (Romania) Jaqueline Cristian (65)
- (Spain) Sara Sorribes Tormo (68)
- Margarita Betova (100)

=== Qualifiers ===
- Mirra Andreeva
- (China) Bai Zhuoxuan
- (Spain) Jéssica Bouzas Maneiro
- (Switzerland) Viktorija Golubic
- (Slovakia) Viktória Hrunčáková
- (Australia) Storm Hunter
- (Slovenia) Kaja Juvan
- (United States) Sofia Kenin
- (Belgium) Greet Minnen
- (Switzerland) Céline Naef
- (Italy) Lucrezia Stefanini
- (Serbia) Natalija Stevanović
- (Switzerland) Simona Waltert
- (Belgium) Yanina Wickmayer
- (China) Yuan Yue
- (Canada) Carol Zhao

=== Lucky losers ===
- (Japan) Nao Hibino
- (Germany) Tamara Korpatsch

=== Withdrawals ===
The entry list was released based on the WTA rankings for the week of 22 May 2023.

- † (Romania) Simona Halep (34) → replaced by Margarita Betova (100 SR)
- † (United States) Amanda Anisimova (89) → replaced by (Argentina) Nadia Podoroska (101)
- † (Belgium) Alison Van Uytvanck (97) → replaced by (Italy) Lucia Bronzetti (102)
- ‡ (Australia) Ajla Tomljanović (46) → replaced by (Hungary) Anna Bondár (103)
- @ Anna Kalinskaya (53) → replaced by (Germany) Tamara Korpatsch (LL)
- § (Montenegro) Danka Kovinić (65) → replaced by (Japan) Nao Hibino (LL)

† – not included on entry list
‡ – withdrew from entry list before qualifying began
@ – withdrew from entry list after qualifying began
§ – withdrew from main draw

| Preceded by 2023 French Open – Women's singles | Grand Slam women's singles | Succeeded by 2023 US Open – Women's singles |
