= 2018 President's Cup – Women's singles =

Women's singles
- 2018 President's Cup (tennis)

Final
- Champion: (Georgia (country)) Ekaterine Gorgodze
- Runner-up: (Uzbekistan) Sabina Sharipova
- Score: 6–4, 6–1

Events
| Singles | men | women |
| Doubles | men | women |
- President's Cup (tennis)

Zhang Shuai was the defending champion, but chose not to participate.

Ekaterine Gorgodze won the title after defeating Sabina Sharipova 6–4, 6–1 in the final.

== Seeds ==
1. (Uzbekistan) Sabina Sharipova (final)
2. (Czech Republic) Marie Bouzková (semifinals)
3. (Serbia) Nina Stojanović (second round)
4. (Russia) Olga Doroshina (quarterfinals)
5. (Georgia (country)) Ekaterine Gorgodze (champion)
6. (Uzbekistan) Nigina Abduraimova (second round)
7. (Russia) Valeria Savinykh (second round)
8. (Japan) Mai Minokoshi (second round)

== Draw ==
Key

- Q = Qualifier
- WC = Wild card
- LL = Lucky loser
- Alt = Alternate
- ITF = ITF entry
- PR = Protected ranking
- SR = Special ranking
- SE = Special exempt
- JE = Junior exempt
- JR = Junior Accelerator Programme entrant
- CO = College Accelerator Programme entrant
- NG = Next Gen Accelerator Program entrant
- w/o = Walkover
- r = Retired
- d = Defaulted

=== Finals ===
Semifinals
1 | (Uzbekistan) Sabina Sharipova | 6 | 6
(Russia) Varvara Flink | 3 | 4
5 | (Georgia (country)) Ekaterine Gorgodze | 6 | 4 | 6
2 | (Czech Republic) Marie Bouzková | 2 | 6 | 4

Final
1 | (Uzbekistan) Sabina Sharipova | 4 | 1
5 | (Georgia (country)) Ekaterine Gorgodze | 6 | 6

=== Top half ===
First round
1 | (Uzbekistan) S Sharipova | 5 | 6 | 6
(Germany) V Heisen | 7 | 1 | 3
Q | (Russia) K Laskutova | 2 | 4
(Turkey) B Cengiz | 6 | 6
(Serbia) N Kostić | 6 | 7
(Russia) S Lansere | 4 | 5
Q | (Russia) A Frolova | 3 | 4
7 | (Russia) V Savinykh | 6 | 6
4 | (Russia) O Doroshina | 6 | 7
(Belarus) I Shymanovich | 3 | 5
(Russia) A Morgina | 7 | 3 | 2
(Russia) N Kukharchuk | 5 | 6 | 6
(Russia) V Flink | 6 | 6
(Georgia (country)) M Bolkvadze | 3 | 3
Q | (Serbia) B Jovanovski Petrović | 3 | 2
6 | (Uzbekistan) N Abduraimova | 6 | 6

Second round
1 | (Uzbekistan) S Sharipova | 6 | 6
(Turkey) B Cengiz | 1 | 3
(Serbia) N Kostić | 6 | 6
7 | (Russia) V Savinykh | 4 | 3
4 | (Russia) O Doroshina | 6 | 6
(Russia) N Kukharchuk | 2 | 0
(Russia) V Flink | 6 | 6
6 | (Uzbekistan) N Abduraimova | 4 | 3

Quarterfinals
1 | (Uzbekistan) S Sharipova | 6 | 7
(Serbia) N Kostić | 3 | 5
4 | (Russia) O Doroshina | 4 | 3
(Russia) V Flink | 6 | 6

Semifinals
1 | (Uzbekistan) S Sharipova | 6 | 6
(Russia) V Flink | 3 | 4

=== Bottom half ===
First round
5 | (Georgia (country)) E Gorgodze | 6 | 6
WC | (Kazakhstan) A Astakhova | 2 | 4
(Uzbekistan) A Amanmuradova | 6 | 6
(Kazakhstan) G Ainitdinova | 2 | 1
(Russia) E Kazionova | 3 | 4
(Russia) A Gasanova | 6 | 6
(Australia) N Bains | 0 | 4
3 | (Serbia) N Stojanović | 6 | 6
8 | (Japan) M Minokoshi | 6 | 7
WC | (Kazakhstan) D Detkovskaya | 1 | 5
Q | (Russia) D Astakhova | 0 | 6 | 5
(Russia) E Yashina | 6 | 2 | 7
WC | (Hong Kong) K-y Ng | 3 | 4
WC | (Kazakhstan) A Danilina | 6 | 6
(Poland) U Radwańska | 6 | 3 | 5
2 | (Czech Republic) M Bouzková | 2 | 6 | 7

Second round
5 | (Georgia (country)) E Gorgodze | 7 | 7^{7}
(Uzbekistan) A Amanmuradova | 5 | 6^{4}
(Russia) A Gasanova | 7^{8} | 6
3 | (Serbia) N Stojanović | 6^{6} | 3
8 | (Japan) M Minokoshi | 3 | 4
(Russia) E Yashina | 6 | 6
WC | (Kazakhstan) A Danilina | 2 | 1
2 | (Czech Republic) M Bouzková | 6 | 6

Quarterfinals
5 | (Georgia (country)) E Gorgodze | 6 | 6
(Russia) A Gasanova | 4 | 4
(Russia) E Yashina | 3 | 7^{7} | 2
2 | (Czech Republic) M Bouzková | 6 | 6^{3} | 6

Semifinals
5 | (Georgia (country)) E Gorgodze | 6 | 4 | 6
2 | (Czech Republic) M Bouzková | 2 | 6 | 4
