= 2022 Budapest Grand Prix =

Women's tennis tournament

- Date: 11–17 July
- Edition: 20th
- Category: WTA 250
- Surface: Clay / outdoor
- Location: Budapest, Hungary
- Venue: Római Tennis Academy

Champions

Singles
- (United States) Bernarda Pera

Doubles
- (Georgia (country)) Ekaterine Gorgodze / (Georgia (country)) Oksana Kalashnikova
| ← 2021 · | Budapest Grand Prix | · 2023 → |

The 2022 Hungarian Grand Prix was a tennis tournament played on outdoor clay courts. It was the 20th edition of the Budapest Grand Prix, a 250-level tournament on the 2022 WTA Tour. It took place at Római Tennis Academy in Budapest, Hungary, from 11 through 17 July 2022.

== Champions ==
=== Singles ===
- (United States) Bernarda Pera def. (Serbia) Aleksandra Krunić 6–3, 6–3

This is Pera's first ever WTA singles title.

=== Doubles ===
- (Georgia (country)) Ekaterine Gorgodze / (Georgia (country)) Oksana Kalashnikova def. (Poland) Katarzyna Piter / (Belgium) Kimberley Zimmermann 1–6, 6–4, [10–6]

== Singles main draw entrants ==
=== Seeds ===
| Country | Player | Rank^{†} | Seed |
|---|---|---|---|
| CZE | Barbora Krejčíková | 14 | 1 |
| ITA | Martina Trevisan | 29 | 2 |
| KAZ | Yulia Putintseva | 33 | 3 |
| UKR | Anhelina Kalinina | 34 | 4 |
| | Aliaksandra Sasnovich | 35 | 5 |
| CHN | Zhang Shuai | 41 | 6 |
| ROU | Elena-Gabriela Ruse | 54 | 7 |
| ~~CZE~~ | ~~Tereza Martincová~~ | ~~61~~ | ~~8~~ |
| HUN | Anna Bondár | 64 | 9 |

^{†} Rankings are as of 27 June 2022

=== Other entrants ===
The following players received wildcard entry into the singles main draw:

- (Hungary) Tímea Babos
- (Hungary) Réka Luca Jani
- (Hungary) Natália Szabanin

The following players received entry with a protected ranking:

- (Germany) Laura Siegemund

The following players received entry from the qualifying draw:

- (Brazil) Carolina Alves
- (Ukraine) Kateryna Baindl
- (Czech Republic) Jesika Malečková
- (Greece) Despina Papamichail
- (United States) Bernarda Pera
- (Hungary) Fanny Stollár

The following players received entry as lucky losers:

- (Spain) Marina Bassols Ribera
- (Brazil) Laura Pigossi

=== Withdrawals ===
Before the tournament

- (United States) Claire Liu → replaced by (Hungary) Dalma Gálfi
- (Ukraine) Marta Kostyuk → replaced by (Hungary) Panna Udvardy
- (Czech Republic) Tereza Martincová → replaced by (Spain) Marina Bassols Ribera
- (Germany) Andrea Petkovic → replaced by Kamilla Rakhimova
- (Kazakhstan) Elena Rybakina → replaced by (Brazil) Laura Pigossi
- (Australia) Ajla Tomljanović → replaced by (Georgia (country)) Ekaterine Gorgodze
- (China) Wang Xinyu → replaced by (China) Wang Xiyu
- (China) Zheng Qinwen → replaced by (Romania) Ana Bogdan

=== Retirements ===
During the tournament

- (Ukraine) Anhelina Kalinina
- (Ukraine) Lesia Tsurenko

== Doubles main draw entrants ==
=== Seeds ===
| Country | Player | Country | Player | Rank^{†} | Seed |
|---|---|---|---|---|---|
| GER | Laura Siegemund | CHN | Zhang Shuai | 52 | 1 |
| KAZ | Anna Danilina | SRB | Aleksandra Krunić | 63 | 2 |
| GEO | Natela Dzalamidze | | Kamilla Rakhimova | 111 | 3 |
| GEO | Ekaterine Gorgodze | GEO | Oksana Kalashnikova | 125 | 4 |

† Rankings are as of 27 June 2022

=== Other entrants ===
The following pairs received wildcard entry into main draw:

- (Hungary) Réka Luca Jani / (Hungary) Adrienn Nagy
- (Hungary) Natalia Szabanin / (Hungary) Luca Udvardy

=== Withdrawals ===
Before the tournament

- (Ukraine) Marta Kostyuk / (Romania) Elena-Gabriela Ruse → replaced by (France) Elixane Lechemia / (Czech Republic) Jesika Malečková
- (United States) Kaitlyn Christian / Lidziya Marozava → replaced by (Indonesia) Jessy Rompies / (Chinese Taipei) Hsieh Yu-chieh
- (Romania) Irina Bara / (Georgia (country)) Ekaterine Gorgodze → replaced by (Georgia (country)) Ekaterine Gorgodze / (Georgia (country)) Oksana Kalashnikova
