= 2018 President's Cup – Men's singles =

Men's singles
- 2018 President's Cup (tennis)

Final
- Champion: (Austria) Sebastian Ofner
- Runner-up: (Germany) Daniel Brands
- Score: 7–6^{(7–5)}, 6–3

Events
Singles	men	women
Doubles	men	women
- President's Cup (tennis)

Egor Gerasimov was the defending champion but lost in the second round to Jurij Rodionov.

Sebastian Ofner won the title after defeating Daniel Brands 7–6^{(7–5)}, 6–3 in the final.

== Seeds ==
1. (Russia) Mikhail Youzhny (second round)
2. (Kazakhstan) Alexander Bublik (first round)
3. (Austria) Sebastian Ofner (champion)
4. (Japan) Hiroki Moriya (first round)
5. (Belarus) Egor Gerasimov (second round)
6. (South Korea) Lee Duck-hee (second round)
7. (Russia) Ivan Nedelko (first round)
8. (Turkey) Cem İlkel (first round)

== Draw ==
Key

- Q = Qualifier
- WC = Wild card
- LL = Lucky loser
- Alt = Alternate
- ITF = ITF entry
- PR = Protected ranking
- SR = Special ranking
- SE = Special exempt
- JE = Junior exempt
- JR = Junior Accelerator Programme entrant
- CO = College Accelerator Programme entrant
- NG = Next Gen Accelerator Program entrant
- w/o = Walkover
- r = Retired
- d = Defaulted

=== Finals ===
Semifinals
(Germany) Daniel Brands	6	3	7
(Austria) Jurij Rodionov	4	6	5
3	(Austria) Sebastian Ofner	6	6
(Australia) Alexei Popyrin	3	3

Final
(Germany) Daniel Brands	6^{5}	3
3	(Austria) Sebastian Ofner	7^{7}	6

=== Top half ===
First round
1	(Russia) M Youzhny	6	2	7
(Colombia) A González	3	6	5
Q	(India) S Myneni	7^{7}	4	6
(Bosnia and Herzegovina) A Šetkić	6^{5}	6	4
(Japan) Hiroyasu Ehara	3	6^{5}
(Russia) I Gakhov	6	7^{7}
(Germany) D Brands	6	6
8	(Turkey) C İlkel	0	4
4	(Japan) H Moriya	4	2
(France) M Janvier	6	6
(Kazakhstan) D Yevseyev	4	6	6
(Russia) R Safiullin	6	3	4
(Belgium) Y Mertens	5	0
(Austria) J Rodionov	7	6
(France) D Guez	6^{6}	3
5	(Belarus) E Gerasimov	7^{8}	6

Second round
1	(Russia) M Youzhny	6	4	3
Q	(India) S Myneni	3	6	6
(Russia) I Gakhov	7^{7}	3	3
(Germany) D Brands	6^{3}	6	6
(France) M Janvier	4	7	6
(Kazakhstan) D Yevseyev	6	5	3
(Austria) J Rodionov	7	6
5	(Belarus) E Gerasimov	5	2

Quarterfinals
Q	(India) S Myneni	4	7^{12}	5
(Germany) D Brands	6	6^{10}	7
(France) M Janvier	7^{7}	4	4
(Austria) J Rodionov	6^{3}	6	6

Semifinals
(Germany) D Brands	6	3	7
(Austria) J Rodionov	4	6	5

=== Bottom half ===
First round
7	(Russia) I Nedelko	6^{2}	7	3
WC	(Kazakhstan) A Nedovyesov	7^{7}	5	6
LL	(India) A Kadhe	6	3
LL	(Belarus) D Zhyrmont	2	3^{r}
WC	(Uzbekistan) F Dustov	4	2
Q	(Uzbekistan) K Sultanov	6	6
WC	(Kazakhstan) T Khabibulin	5	1
3	(Austria) S Ofner	7	6
6	(South Korea) D-h Lee	6	6
WC	(Kazakhstan) Sagadat Ayap	4	2
(Spain) R Ortega Olmedo	6^{8}	6	5
Q	(Russia) P Kotov	7^{10}	4	7
(France) Y Jankovits	6	7^{7}
Q	(France) H Grenier	3	6^{4}
(Australia) A Popyrin	5	6	6
2	(Kazakhstan) A Bublik	7	3	4

Second round
WC	(Kazakhstan) A Nedovyesov	6	6^{4}	6
LL	(India) A Kadhe	3	7^{7}	4
Q	(Uzbekistan) K Sultanov	3	3
3	(Austria) S Ofner	6	6
6	(South Korea) D-h Lee	7	6^{4}	5
Q	(Russia) P Kotov	5	7^{7}	7
(France) Y Jankovits	6^{6}	5
(Australia) A Popyrin	7^{8}	7

Quarterfinals
WC	(Kazakhstan) A Nedovyesov	5	6	1
3	(Austria) S Ofner	7	1	6
Q	(Russia) P Kotov	1	4
(Australia) A Popyrin	6	6

Semifinals
3	(Austria) S Ofner	6	6
(Australia) A Popyrin	3	3
