= 2018 President's Cup – Women's doubles =

Tennis event

Women's doubles
- 2018 President's Cup (tennis)

Final
- Champions: (Turkey) Berfu Cengiz (Kazakhstan) Anna Danilina
- Runners-up: (Uzbekistan) Akgul Amanmuradova (Georgia (country)) Ekaterine Gorgodze
- Score: 3–6, 6–3, [10–7]

Events
Singles	men	women
Doubles	men	women
- President's Cup (tennis)

Natela Dzalamidze and Veronika Kudermetova were the defending champions, but decided not to participate.

Berfu Cengiz and Anna Danilina won the title after defeating Akgul Amanmuradova and Ekaterine Gorgodze 3–6, 6–3, [10–7] in the final.

== Seeds ==
1. (Australia) Naiktha Bains / (Serbia) Nina Stojanović (quarterfinals)
2. (Russia) Olga Doroshina / (Netherlands) Rosalie van der Hoek (first round)
3. (Russia) Anastasia Gasanova / (Russia) Ekaterina Yashina (semifinals)
4. (Uzbekistan) Akgul Amanmuradova / (Georgia (country)) Ekaterine Gorgodze (final)

== Draw ==
Key

- Q = Qualifier
- WC = Wild card
- LL = Lucky loser
- Alt = Alternate
- ITF = ITF entry
- PR = Protected ranking
- SR = Special ranking
- SE = Special exempt
- JE = Junior exempt
- JR = Junior Accelerator Programme entrant
- CO = College Accelerator Programme entrant
- NG = Next Gen Accelerator Program entrant
- w/o = Walkover
- r = Retired
- d = Defaulted

=== Draw ===
First round
1	(Australia) N Bains (Serbia) N Stojanović	6	6
WC	(Kazakhstan) P Goloputova (Russia) N Kurginyan	1	0
WC	(Kazakhstan) D Detkovskaya (Russia) E Kazionova	1	2
(Turkey) B Cengiz (Kazakhstan) A Danilina	6	6
3	(Russia) A Gasanova (Russia) E Yashina	5	6	[10]
WC	(Kazakhstan) G Ainitdinova (Turkey) İ Öz	7	3	[6]
(Hong Kong) K-y Ng (Russia) V Savinykh	6	6
(Belarus) I Kremen (Belarus) I Shymanovich	1	0
(Indonesia) B Gumulya (Indonesia) J Rompies	7	6
(Uzbekistan) S Sharipova (Japan) K Takahata	5	3
(Croatia) M Dražić (Kyrgyzstan) K Palkina	6^{2}	3
4	(Uzbekistan) A Amanmuradova (Georgia (country)) E Gorgodze	7^{7}	6
(Germany) V Heisen (Serbia) N Kostić	6	7^{7}
Alt	(Czech Republic) M Bouzková (Serbia) T Čurović	4	6^{4}
(Uzbekistan) N Abduraimova (Russia) A Frolova	1	7	[10]
2	(Russia) O Doroshina (Netherlands) R van der Hoek	6	5	[5]

Quarterfinals
1	(Australia) N Bains (Serbia) N Stojanović	5	4
(Turkey) B Cengiz (Kazakhstan) A Danilina	7	6
3	(Russia) A Gasanova (Russia) E Yashina	6	6
(Hong Kong) K-y Ng (Russia) V Savinykh	1	3
(Indonesia) B Gumulya (Indonesia) J Rompies	1	3
4	(Uzbekistan) A Amanmuradova (Georgia (country)) E Gorgodze	6	6
(Germany) V Heisen (Serbia) N Kostić	2	4
(Uzbekistan) N Abduraimova (Russia) A Frolova	6	6

Semifinals
(Turkey) B Cengiz (Kazakhstan) A Danilina	6	6
3	(Russia) A Gasanova (Russia) E Yashina	1	2
4	(Uzbekistan) A Amanmuradova (Georgia (country)) E Gorgodze	6	6
(Uzbekistan) N Abduraimova (Russia) A Frolova	3	4

Final
(Turkey) B Cengiz (Kazakhstan) A Danilina	3	6	[10]
4	(Uzbekistan) A Amanmuradova (Georgia (country)) E Gorgodze	6	3	[7]
