= Schönbusch Open =

- 2026 SanLucar Ladies Open

ITF Women's Tour
- Event name: Schönbusch Open
- Location: Aschaffenburg, Germany
- Venue: TC Schönbusch Aschaffenburg
- Category: ITF Women's Circuit
- Surface: Clay
- Draw: 32S/32Q/16D
- Prize money: $100,000
- Website: sanlucar-ladies-open.de

Schönbusch Open (currently sponsored as SanLucar Ladies Open supported by Edeka Stenger) is a professional tennis tournament. The event is played on outdoor clay courts and is classified as a W100 ITF Women's Circuit tournament. It has been held in Aschaffenburg, Germany, since 2010. Before 2026, the tournament was lower ITF tiers.

== Past finals ==
=== Singles ===
Year	Champion	Runner-up	Score
2026	(Georgia (country)) Ekaterine Gorgodze	(Ukraine) Anastasiia Sobolieva	6–0, 1–0 ret.
2025	(Italy) Nuria Brancaccio	(Czech Republic) Nikola Bartůňková	4–6, 6–4, 6–4
2024	(United States) Madison Sieg	(Slovenia) Nika Radišić	6–4, 6–4
2023	(Belgium) Marie Benoît	(Czech Republic) Julie Štruplová	6–3, 6–3
2022	(Spain) Jéssica Bouzas Maneiro	(Germany) Katharina Hobgarski	6–1, 6–2
2021	Tournament cancelled due to the COVID-19 pandemic		
2020	Tournament cancelled due to the COVID-19 pandemic		
2019	(Greece) Despina Papamichail	(Germany) Jule Niemeier	6–2, 5–7, 6–2
2018	(Germany) Anna Zaja	(Germany) Katharina Hobgarski	6–4, 7–5
2017	(Germany) Katharina Hobgarski	(Spain) Yvonne Cavallé Reimers	7–5, 6–4
2016	(Russia) Anna Kalinskaya	(Slovenia) Dalila Jakupović	6–3, 2–6, 6–2
2015	(Croatia) Tena Lukas	(France) Fiona Ferro	7–5, 6–4
2014	(Netherlands) Lesley Kerkhove	(Germany) Carina Witthöft	7–5, 6–3
2013	(Slovenia) Maša Zec Peškirič	(Slovenia) Dalila Jakupović	6–4, 6–4
2012	(Germany) Anna-Lena Friedsam	(Germany) Kathrin Wörle-Scheller	6–4, 2–6, 6–4
2011	(Argentina) Florencia Molinero	(Liechtenstein) Stephanie Vogt	7–6^{(8–6)}, 6–1
2010	(Romania) Mădălina Gojnea	(France) Caroline Garcia	6–1, 6–0

=== Doubles ===
Year	Champions	Runners-up	Score
2026	(United States) Rasheeda McAdoo (Kenya) Angella Okutoyi	(Serbia) Elena Milovanović (Slovenia) Kristina Novak	6–3, 6–3
2025	(United States) Rasheeda McAdoo (Kenya) Angella Okutoyi	(Germany) Laura Böhner (Switzerland) Chelsea Fontenel	1–6, 6–2, [10–7]
2024	(Netherlands) Jasmijn Gimbrère (Netherlands) Stéphanie Visscher	(Romania) Andreea Prisăcariu (Czech Republic) Julie Štruplová	6–1, 1–6, [10–3]
2023	Elena Pridankina (Czech Republic) Ivana Šebestová	(France) Manon Léonard (France) Lucie Nguyen Tan	2–6, 6–2, [10–5]
2022	Irina Khromacheva; Maria Timofeeva	(Czech Republic) Karolína Kubáňová (Czech Republic) Ivana Šebestová	6–2, 5–7, [10–3]
2021	Tournament cancelled due to the COVID-19 pandemic		
2020	Tournament cancelled due to the COVID-19 pandemic		
2019	(Italy) Tatiana Pieri (Australia) Ivana Popovic	(Spain) Irene Burillo (Greece) Despina Papamichail	7–6^{(7–5)}, 6–4
2018	(Russia) Polina Leykina (Bulgaria) Isabella Shinikova	(Finland) Emma Laine (United States) Chiara Scholl	7–6^{(7–4)}, 7–5
2017	(Germany) Katharina Hobgarski (Germany) Julia Lohoff	(United States) Yuki Chiang (Germany) Lisa Ponomar	6–3, 2–6, [10–3]
2016	(Germany) Nicola Geuer (Germany) Anna Zaja	(Slovenia) Dalila Jakupović (China) Lu Jiajing	6–4, 6–4
2015	(Latvia) Diāna Marcinkēviča (Ukraine) Alyona Sotnikova	(Ukraine) Alena Fomina (Ukraine) Sofiya Kovalets	3–6, 6–4, [10–5]
2014	(Japan) Rika Fujiwara (Japan) Yuuki Tanaka	(Netherlands) Lesley Kerkhove (Switzerland) Xenia Knoll	6–1, 6–4
2013	(Netherlands) Demi Schuurs (Netherlands) Eva Wacanno	(Germany) Carolin Daniels (Germany) Laura Schaeder	7–5, 1–6, [14–12]
2012	(Argentina) Florencia Molinero (Liechtenstein) Stephanie Vogt	(Denmark) Malou Ejdesgaard (Hungary) Réka Luca Jani	6–3, 7–6^{(7–3)}
2011	(Turkey) Pemra Özgen (Japan) Yurika Sema	(Czech Republic) Hana Birnerová (Liechtenstein) Stephanie Vogt	6–4, 7–6^{(7–5)}
2010	(Serbia) Teodora Mirčić (Japan) Erika Sema	(Romania) Elena Bogdan (Chile) Andrea Koch Benvenuto	7–6^{(7–4)}, 2–6, [10–8]
