= 2022 Budapest Grand Prix – Doubles =

Doubles
- 2022 Budapest Grand Prix

Final
- Champions: (Georgia (country)) Ekaterine Gorgodze (Georgia (country)) Oksana Kalashnikova
- Runners-up: (Poland) Katarzyna Piter (Belgium) Kimberley Zimmermann
- Score: 1–6, 6–4, [10–6]

Details
- Draw: 16
- Seeds: 4

Events
Singles	Doubles
- Budapest Grand Prix

Mihaela Buzărnescu and Fanny Stollár were the defending champions, but only Stollár chose to defend her title, partnering Tímea Babos. Stollár lost in the semifinals to Katarzyna Piter and Kimberley Zimmermann.

Ekaterine Gorgodze and Oksana Kalashnikova, seeded fourth, won the title, defeating Piter and Zimmermann in the final, 1–6, 6–4, [10–6].

== Seeds ==
1. (Germany) Laura Siegemund / (China) Shuai Zhang (semifinals)
2. (Kazakhstan) Anna Danilina / (Serbia) Aleksandra Krunić (first round)
3. (Georgia (country)) Natela Dzalamidze / Kamilla Rakhimova (first round)
4. (Georgia (country)) Ekaterine Gorgodze / (Georgia (country)) Oksana Kalashnikova (champions)

== Draw ==
Key

- Q = Qualifier
- WC = Wild card
- LL = Lucky loser
- Alt = Alternate
- ITF = ITF entry
- PR = Protected ranking
- SR = Special ranking
- SE = Special exempt
- JE = Junior exempt
- JR = Junior Accelerator Programme entrant
- CO = College Accelerator Programme entrant
- NG = Next Gen Accelerator Program entrant
- w/o = Walkover
- r = Retired
- d = Defaulted

=== Draw ===
First round
1	(Germany) L Siegemund (China) S Zhang	7	6
A Anshba (Czech Republic) A Dețiuc	5	3
WC	(Hungary) N Szabanin (Hungary) L Udvardy	4	6	[6]
(Chinese Taipei) Y-c Hsieh (Indonesia) J Rompies	6	3	[10]
4	(Georgia (country)) E Gorgodze (Georgia (country)) O Kalashnikova	6	6
WC	(Hungary) RL Jani (Hungary) A Nagy	3	2
(France) E Lechemia (Czech Republic) J Malečková	3	2
(Brazil) C Alves (Romania) G Lee	6	6
(Poland) K Piter (Belgium) K Zimmermann	6^{5}	6	[10]
(Argentina) ML Carlé (Italy) E Cocciaretto	7^{7}	4	[5]
(United States) I Neel (Czech Republic) R Voráčová	6	7
3	(Georgia (country)) N Dzalamidze; K Rakhimova	2	5
(Hungary) A Bondár (Hungary) P Udvardy	5	6	[10]
(Germany) J Lohoff (Romania) LI Paar	7	0	[3]
(Hungary) T Babos (Hungary) F Stollár	3	6	[10]
2	(Kazakhstan) A Danilina (Serbia) A Krunić	6	4	[8]

Quarterfinals
1	(Germany) L Siegemund (China) S Zhang	4	6	[10]
(Chinese Taipei) Y-c Hsieh (Indonesia) J Rompies	6	4	[6]
4	(Georgia (country)) E Gorgodze (Georgia (country)) O Kalashnikova	7	6
(Brazil) C Alves (Romania) G Lee	5	3
(Poland) K Piter (Belgium) K Zimmermann	6	4	[10]
(United States) I Neel (Czech Republic) R Voráčová	4	6	[7]
(Hungary) A Bondár (Hungary) P Udvardy	4	6	[5]
(Hungary) T Babos (Hungary) F Stollár	6	1	[10]

Semifinals
1	(Germany) L Siegemund (China) S Zhang	4	4
4	(Georgia (country)) E Gorgodze (Georgia (country)) O Kalashnikova	6	6
(Poland) K Piter (Belgium) K Zimmermann	6	3	[10]
(Hungary) T Babos (Hungary) F Stollár	3	6	[6]

Final
4	(Georgia (country)) E Gorgodze (Georgia (country)) O Kalashnikova	1	6	[10]
(Poland) K Piter (Belgium) K Zimmermann	6	4	[6]
