= 2018 President's Cup – Men's doubles =

Men's doubles
- 2018 President's Cup (tennis)

Final
- Champions: (Russia) Mikhail Elgin (Belarus) Yaraslav Shyla
- Runners-up: (India) Arjun Kadhe (Kazakhstan) Denis Yevseyev
- Score: 7–5, 7–6^{(8–6)}

Events
Singles	men	women
Doubles	men	women
- President's Cup (tennis)

Toshihide Matsui and Vishnu Vardhan were the defending champions but only Matsui chose to defend his title, partnering Saketh Myneni. Matsui lost in the first round to Ivan Gakhov and Roman Safiullin.

Mikhail Elgin and Yaraslav Shyla won the title after defeating Arjun Kadhe and Denis Yevseyev 7–5, 7–6^{(8–6)} in the final.

== Seeds ==
1. (Japan) Toshihide Matsui / (India) Saketh Myneni (first round)
2. (Kazakhstan) Timur Khabibulin / (Ukraine) Volodymyr Uzhylovskyi (semifinals)
3. (Russia) Mikhail Elgin / (Belarus) Yaraslav Shyla (champions)
4. (Turkey) Cem İlkel / (Spain) Roberto Ortega Olmedo (first round)

== Draw ==
Key

- Q = Qualifier
- WC = Wild card
- LL = Lucky loser
- Alt = Alternate
- ITF = ITF entry
- PR = Protected ranking
- SR = Special ranking
- SE = Special exempt
- JE = Junior exempt
- JR = Junior Accelerator Programme entrant
- CO = College Accelerator Programme entrant
- NG = Next Gen Accelerator Program entrant
- w/o = Walkover
- r = Retired
- d = Defaulted

First round
1	(Japan) T Matsui (India) S Myneni	2	2
(Russia) I Gakhov (Russia) R Safiullin	6	6
(Russia) I Nedelko (Belarus) D Zhyrmont	7	2	[6]
WC	(Russia) Anton Chekhov (Uzbekistan) K Sultanov	5	6	[10]
3	(Russia) M Elgin (Belarus) Y Shyla	6^{2}	7	[10]
(Austria) S Ofner (Bosnia and Herzegovina) A Šetkić	7^{7}	5	[2]
WC	(Uzbekistan) F Dustov (Uzbekistan) Amal Sultanbekov	3	0
(France) D Guez (Japan) H Moriya	6	6
(Colombia) A González (Zimbabwe) B Lock	6	7
(Japan) Hiroyasu Ehara (South Korea) D-h Lee	1	5
(India) A Kadhe (Kazakhstan) D Yevseyev	7	2	[10]
4	(Turkey) C İlkel (Spain) R Ortega Olmedo	5	6	[1]
(Kazakhstan) D Popko (Austria) J Rodionov	6	6
WC	(Kazakhstan) Sagadat Ayap (Kazakhstan) Timur Maulenov	2	4
(Kazakhstan) A Bublik (Russia) A Pavlioutchenkov	3	6	[8]
2	(Kazakhstan) T Khabibulin (Ukraine) V Uzhylovskyi	6	3	[10]

Quarterfinals
(Russia) I Gakhov (Russia) R Safiullin	1	7	[10]
WC	(Russia) A Chekhov (Uzbekistan) K Sultanov	6	5	[2]
3	(Russia) M Elgin (Belarus) Y Shyla	6	6
(France) D Guez (Japan) H Moriya	3	3
(Colombia) A González (Zimbabwe) B Lock	6	5	[2]
(India) A Kadhe (Kazakhstan) D Yevseyev	4	7	[10]
(Kazakhstan) D Popko (Austria) J Rodionov
2	(Kazakhstan) T Khabibulin (Ukraine) V Uzhylovskyi	w/o

Semifinals
(Russia) I Gakhov (Russia) R Safiullin	2	6	[4]
3	(Russia) M Elgin (Belarus) Y Shyla	6	4	[10]
(India) A Kadhe (Kazakhstan) D Yevseyev	2	6	[10]
2	(Kazakhstan) T Khabibulin (Ukraine) V Uzhylovskyi	6	1	[5]

Final
3	(Russia) M Elgin (Belarus) Y Shyla	7	7^{8}
(India) A Kadhe (Kazakhstan) D Yevseyev	5	6^{6}
