= 2022 Budapest Grand Prix – Singles =

Singles
- 2022 Budapest Grand Prix

Final
- Champion: (United States) Bernarda Pera
- Runner-up: (Serbia) Aleksandra Krunić
- Score: 6–3, 6–3

Details
- Draw: 32
- Seeds: 8

Events
Singles	Doubles
← 2021 ·	Budapest Grand Prix	· 2023 →

Yulia Putintseva was the defending champion, but was defeated in the semifinals by Aleksandra Krunić.

Qualifier Bernarda Pera won her maiden WTA Tour title, defeating Krunić in the final, 6–3, 6–3. En route to the title, Pera neither dropped a set nor lost more than five games in any set.

== Seeds ==
1. (Czech Republic) Barbora Krejčíková (first round)
2. (Italy) Martina Trevisan (quarterfinals)
3. (Kazakhstan) Yulia Putintseva (semifinals)
4. (Ukraine) Anhelina Kalinina (first round, retired)
5. Aliaksandra Sasnovich (second round)
6. (China) Zhang Shuai (second round)
7. (Romania) Elena-Gabriela Ruse (first round)
8. (Czech Republic) Tereza Martincová (withdrew)
9. (Hungary) Anna Bondár (semifinals)

== Draw ==
=== Key ===
- Q = Qualifier
- WC = Wild card
- LL = Lucky loser
- Alt = Alternate
- SE = Special exempt
- PR = Protected ranking
- ITF = ITF entry
- JE = Junior exempt
- w/o = Walkover
- r = Retired
- d = Defaulted
- SR = Special ranking

=== Finals ===
Semifinals
(Serbia) Aleksandra Krunić	6	6
3	(Kazakhstan) Yulia Putintseva	2	2
Q	(United States) Bernarda Pera	6	6
9	(Hungary) Anna Bondár	3	4

Final
(Serbia) Aleksandra Krunić	3	3
Q	(United States) Bernarda Pera	6	6

=== Top half ===
First round
1	(Czech Republic) B Krejčíková	1	6^{1}
(China) Xiy Wang	6	7^{7}
(Romania) A Bogdan	6	5	6
(Hungary) P Udvardy	2	7	0
PR	(Germany) L Siegemund	3	4
(Serbia) A Krunić	6	6
(Georgia (country)) E Gorgodze	5	1
6	(China) S Zhang	7	6
3	(Kazakhstan) Y Putintseva	6	6
(Slovakia) AK Schmiedlová	4	1
(Sweden) R Peterson	5	3
LL	(Brazil) L Pigossi	7	6
(Ukraine) L Tsurenko	6	6
Q	(Brazil) C Alves	4	1
K Rakhimova	6	6^{3}	6
7	(Romania) E-G Ruse	4	7^{7}	3

Second round
(China) Xiy Wang	7^{7}	7^{12}
(Romania) A Bogdan	6^{2}	6^{10}
(Serbia) A Krunić	6	6
6	(China) S Zhang	1	0
3	(Kazakhstan) Y Putintseva	4	6	6
LL	(Brazil) L Pigossi	6	1	2
(Ukraine) L Tsurenko	6^{1}	6	7
K Rakhimova	7^{7}	4	5

Quarterfinals
(China) Xiy Wang	0	1
(Serbia) A Krunić	6	6
3	(Kazakhstan) Y Putintseva	6	2
(Ukraine) L Tsurenko	0	0^{r}

Semifinals
(Serbia) A Krunić	6	6
3	(Kazakhstan) Y Putintseva	2	2

=== Bottom half ===
First round
5	A Sasnovich	6	0	6
Q	(Hungary) F Stollár	3	6	3
Q	(United States) B Pera	6	7
LL	(Spain) M Bassols Ribera	2	5
WC	(Hungary) RL Jani	6^{7}	2
(Italy) E Cocciaretto	7^{9}	6
(Czech Republic) K Siniaková	6	0
4	(Ukraine) A Kalinina	3	0^{r}
9	(Hungary) A Bondár	6	6
Q	(Czech Republic) J Malečková	4	4
Q	(Greece) D Papamichail	7^{7}	6
(Hungary) D Gálfi	6^{4}	3
Q	(Ukraine) K Baindl	6	6
WC	(Hungary) T Babos	4	3
WC	(Hungary) N Szabanin	6	2	0
2	(Italy) M Trevisan	2	6	6

Second round
5	A Sasnovich	5	2
Q	(United States) B Pera	7	6
(Italy) E Cocciaretto	7	4	7
(Czech Republic) K Siniaková	5	6	5
9	(Hungary) A Bondár	6	6
Q	(Greece) D Papamichail	2	3
Q	(Ukraine) K Baindl	4	5
2	(Italy) M Trevisan	6	7

Quarterfinals
Q	(United States) B Pera	6	6
(Italy) E Cocciaretto	4	3
9	(Hungary) A Bondár	6	6
2	(Italy) M Trevisan	4	1

Semifinals
Q	(United States) B Pera	6	6
9	(Hungary) A Bondár	3	4

== Qualifying ==
=== Seeds ===
1. (United States) Bernarda Pera (qualified)
2. (Brazil) Laura Pigossi (qualifying competition, lucky loser)
3. (Ukraine) Kateryna Baindl (qualified)
4. (Romania) Gabriela Lee (qualifying competition)
5. (United States) Grace Min (first round)
6. (Mexico) Renata Zarazúa (first round, retired)
7. (Finland) Anastasia Kulikova (first round, retired)
8. (Greece) Despina Papamichail (qualified)
9. (Brazil) Carolina Alves (qualified)
10. (Argentina) María Lourdes Carlé (first round)
11. Yuliya Hatouka (first round)
12. (Czech Republic) Jesika Malečková (qualified)

=== Qualifiers ===
1. (United States) Bernarda Pera
2. (Czech Republic) Jesika Malečková
3. (Ukraine) Kateryna Baindl
4. (Brazil) Carolina Alves
5. (Greece) Despina Papamichail
6. (Hungary) Fanny Stollár

=== Lucky losers ===
1. (Brazil) Laura Pigossi
2. (Spain) Marina Bassols Ribera

=== Qualifying draw ===
==== First qualifier ====
First round
1	(United States) Bernarda Pera	6	6
(Ukraine) Katarina Zavatska	1	1
(Georgia (country)) Sofia Shapatava	6	1
7	(Finland) Anastasia Kulikova	3	0^{r}

Qualifying competition
1	(United States) Bernarda Pera	6	6
(Georgia (country)) Sofia Shapatava	1	2

==== Second qualifier ====
First round
2	(Brazil) Laura Pigossi	6	6
Amina Anshba	4	3
WC	(Hungary) Vanesa Dankó	3	2
12	(Czech Republic) Jesika Malečková	6	6

Qualifying competition
2	(Brazil) Laura Pigossi	1	7^{7}	4
12	(Czech Republic) Jesika Malečková	6	6^{2}	6

==== Third qualifier ====
First round
3	(Ukraine) Kateryna Baindl	6	6
(Chile) Daniela Seguel	4	1
WC	(Hungary) Rebeka Stolmár	6	7^{7}
10	(Argentina) María Lourdes Carlé	4	6^{5}

Qualifying competition
3	(Ukraine) Kateryna Baindl	6	7
WC	(Hungary) Rebeka Stolmár	1	5

==== Fourth qualifier ====
First round
4	(Romania) Gabriela Lee	6	7
WC	(Hungary) Anna Kántor	3	5
Ekaterina Reyngold	1	3
9	(Brazil) Carolina Alves	6	6

Qualifying competition
4	(Romania) Gabriela Lee	2	3
9	(Brazil) Carolina Alves	6	6

==== Fifth qualifier ====
First round
5	(United States) Grace Min	6	2	4
PR	Varvara Flink	3	6	6
WC	(Hungary) Amarissa Kiara Tóth	7	2	0^{r}
8	(Greece) Despina Papamichail	5	6	1

Qualifying competition
PR	Varvara Flink	6^{4}	3
8	(Greece) Despina Papamichail	7^{7}	6

==== Sixth qualifier ====
First round
6	(Mexico) Renata Zarazúa	1	0^{r}
WC	(Hungary) Fanny Stollár	6	1
(Spain) Marina Bassols Ribera	0	7	6
11	Yuliya Hatouka	6	5	4

Qualifying competition
WC	(Hungary) Fanny Stollár	6	6
(Spain) Marina Bassols Ribera	1	4
