= Anastasiia Sobolieva =

Ukrainian tennis player (born 2004)

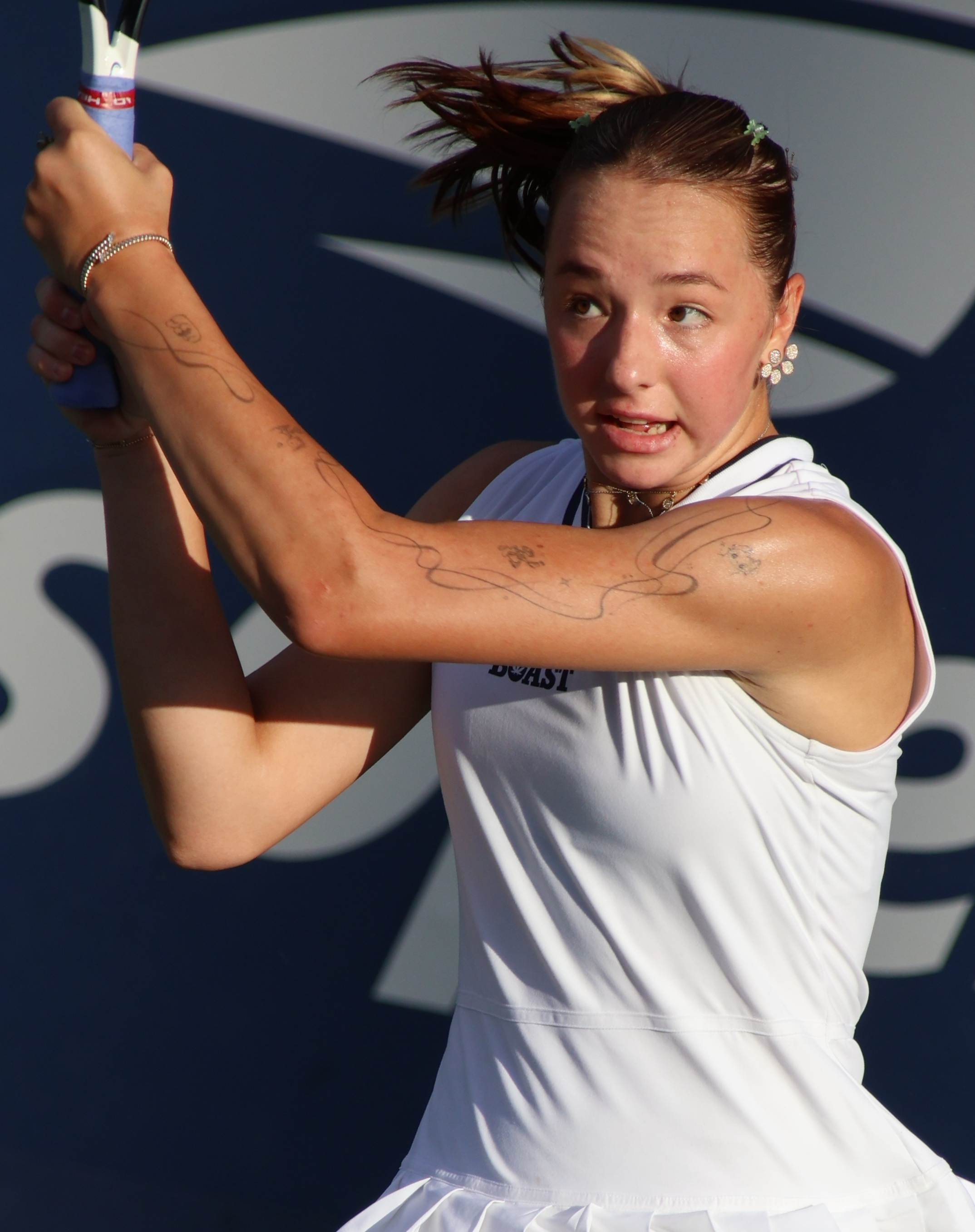
- Sobolieva at the 2026 US Open
- Full name: Anastasiia Kostyantynivna Sobolieva
- Country (sports): Ukraine
- Born: 23 April 2004 (age 22) Dnipropetrovsk, Ukraine
- Plays: Right (two-handed backhand)
- Prize money: $403,689

Singles
- Career record: 246–144
- Career titles: 10 ITF
- Highest ranking: No. 167 (12 October 2026)
- Current ranking: No. 167 (12 October 2026)

Grand Slam singles results
- Australian Open: Q1 (2025)
- French Open: 1R (2025)
- Wimbledon: Q1 (2024)
- US Open: Q1 (2024, 2025, 2026)

Doubles
- Career record: 46–55
- Career titles: 3 ITF
- Highest ranking: No. 430 (14 September 2026)
- Current ranking: No. 469 (12 October 2026)
- Last updated on: 14 October 2026.

Anastasiia Kostyantynivna Sobolieva (Ukrainian: Анастасія Костянтинівна Соболєва; born 23 April 2004) is a Ukrainian tennis player. She has a career-high WTA singles ranking of No. 167, achieved on 12 October 2026. Her best doubles ranking of No. 430 was achieved on 14 September 2026. She has won ten singles titles and three doubles titles on the ITF World Tour.

== Career ==
Sobolieva made her WTA Tour main-draw debut at the 2023 Transylvania Open, going through the qualifying, before losing in the first round to Ana Bogdan, in three sets.

Entering as an alternate at the 2024 Swedish Open, she lost in first round, again in three sets, this time to Katarzyna Kawa. Sobolieva qualified for the 2024 Prague Open but was defeated in her opening match by Eva Lys.

She reached the second round at the WTA 125 2024 Ljubljana Open defeating wildcard Ela Nala Milić, before losing to Nuria Brancaccio.

Ranked No. 230, Sobolieva made her major debut at the 2025 French Open, after qualifying for her first main draw with a win over 22nd seed Francesca Jones.

== ITF Circuit finals ==
=== Singles: 15 (10 titles, 5 runner-ups) ===
Legend
W100 tournaments (0–1)
W50 tournaments (2–1)
W35 tournaments (3–2)
W15 tournaments (5–1)

Result	W–L	Date	Tournament	Tier	Surface	Opponent	Score
Win	1–0	Apr 2021	ITF Antalya, Turkiye	W15	Clay	(Italy) Nuria Brancaccio	6–0, 7–6^{(5)}
Loss	1–1	Apr 2021	ITF Antalya, Turkiye	W15	Clay	(Burundi) Sada Nahimana	4–6, 6–7^{(8)}
Win	2–1	Jun 2021	ITF Shymkent, Kazakhstan	W15	Clay	(Russia) Valeriia Olianovskaia	6–4, 7–6^{(4)}
Win	3–1	Dec 2022	ITF Antalya, Turkiye	W15	Clay	(Hungary) Amarissa Tóth	6–4, 2–6, 6–3
Win	4–1	Jan 2023	ITF Antalya, Turkiye	W15	Clay	Alexandra Shubladze	6–2, 6–1
Win	5–1	Jan 2023	ITF Antalya, Turkiye	W15	Clay	Daria Lodikova	6–7^{(3)}, 7–5, 7–6^{(5)}
Loss	5–2	Jan 2024	ITF Antalya, Turkiye	W35	Clay	(Romania) Cristina Dinu	3–6, 0–1 ret.
Win	6–2	Apr 2024	ITF Santa Margherita di Pula, Italy	W35	Clay	(Italy) Diletta Cherubini	6–1, 6–1
Win	7–2	Apr 2024	ITF Santa Margherita di Pula, Italy	W35	Clay	(Czech Republic) Lucie Havlíčková	7–5, 6–3
Win	8–2	Apr 2025	ITF Santa Margherita di Pula	W35	Clay	(France) Emma Léné	6–0, 3–6, 6–2
Loss	8–3	May 2026	ITF Santa Margherita di Pula	W35	Clay	(Italy) Verena Meliss	2–6, 2–6
Win	9–3	Jun 2026	ITF Gdańsk, Poland	W50	Clay	(Poland) Gina Feistel	6–4, 6–2
Win	10–3	Jun 2026	ITF Stuttgart-Vaihingen, Germany	W50	Clay	(France) Alice Tubello	3–6, 7–6^{(5)}, 6–2
Loss	10–4	Jul 2026	Schönbusch Open, Germany	W100	Clay	(Georgia (country)) Ekaterine Gorgodze	0–6, 0–1 ret.
Loss	10–5	Oct 2026	ITF Burgas, Bulgaria	W50	Clay	(Spain) Ane Mintegi del Olmo	7–5, 4–6, 0–6

=== Doubles: 5 (3 titles, 2 runner-ups) ===
Legend
W50 tournaments (0–1)
W25/35 tournaments (1–1)
W15 tournaments (2–0)

Result	No.	Date	Tournament	Tier	Surface	Partner	Opponents	Score
Win	1–0	Nov 2021	ITF Antalya, Turkiye	W15	Clay	(Russia) Diana Shnaider	(Serbia) Tamara Čurović (Hungary) Amarissa Tóth	6–2, 6–0
Loss	1–1	Nov 2022	ITF Heraklion, Greece	W25	Clay	(Bulgaria) Denislava Glushkova	(Romania) Oana Gavrilă; Ekaterina Makarova	1–6, 3–6
Win	2–1	Jul 2023	ITF Vejle, Denmark	W15	Clay	(Ukraine) Daria Yesypchuk	(Denmark) Rebecca Munk Mortensen (Denmark) Hannah Viller Møller	7–5, 7–6^{(3)}
Win	3–1	May 2026	ITF Santa Margherita di Pula, Italy	W35	Clay	(Latvia) Beatrise Zeltiņa	(Romania) Ruxandra Bertea (Switzerland) Katerina Tsygourova	6–4, 6–1
Loss	3–2	Jun 2026	ITF Stuttgart-Vaihingen, Germany	W50	Clay	(Ukraine) Anastasiya Zaparyniuk	(Argentina) María Lourdes Carlé (Argentina) Julia Riera	2–6, 3–6
