= Ekaterine Gorgodze =

Georgian tennis player

Ekaterine Gorgodze ეკატერინე გორგოძე
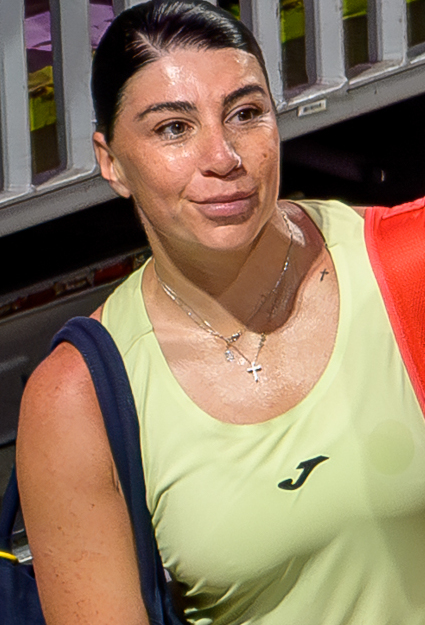
- Gorgodze at the 2026 Transylvania Open
- Country (sports): Georgia
- Born: 3 December 1991 (age 34)
- Plays: Left (two-handed backhand)
- Prize money: $1,335,659

Singles
- Career record: 624–468
- Career titles: 20 ITF
- Highest ranking: No. 108 (23 May 2022)
- Current ranking: No. 188 (16 November 2026)

Grand Slam singles results
- Australian Open: Q2 (2022)
- French Open: 1R (2021)
- Wimbledon: 1R (2022)
- US Open: Q3 (2026)

Doubles
- Career record: 416–285
- Career titles: 2 WTA, 7 WTA Challengers
- Highest ranking: No. 43 (15 August 2022)
- Current ranking: No. 162 (16 November 2026)

Grand Slam doubles results
- Australian Open: 1R (2022)
- French Open: 1R (2022)
- Wimbledon: 1R (2022)
- US Open: 1R (2022)

Team competitions
- Fed Cup: 32–29
- Last updated on: 19 November 2026.

Ekaterine Gorgodze (Georgian: ეკატერინე გორგოძე, romanized: ek'at'erine gorgodze, pronounced [ekʼatʼeɾine ɡoɾɡodze]; born 3 December 1991) is a Georgian professional tennis player. On 23 May 2022, she reached her best singles ranking of world No. 108. On 15 August 2022, she peaked at No. 43 in the doubles rankings.

Gorgodze has won two doubles titles on the WTA Tour, plus seven doubles titles on the WTA Challenger Tour, along with 20 singles and 38 doubles titles on the ITF Women's Circuit. Since her debut for Georgia Fed Cup team in 2007, Gorgodze has accumulated a win–loss record of 21–23 in singles and 11–6 in doubles (overall 32–29), as of November 2026.

== Career ==
=== Singles ===
She made her WTA Tour singles debut 2012 in Baku as a wildcard. In March 2021, she qualified for the Miami Open making her WTA 1000 debut but lost to Anna Kalinskaya. In April, she entered the Porsche Tennis Grand Prix as a lucky loser, making her WTA 500 debut but lost to Angelique Kerber. She made her major debut at the 2021 French Open, after qualifying for the main draw. Nine years after her WTA Tour debut, Gorgodze recorded her first win at the Poland Open in Gdynia, Poland over lucky loser Anastasia Zakharova, after qualifying into the main draw. She then defeated Varvara Lepchenko to reach her first WTA Tour quarterfinal.

She reached her best singles ranking of world No. 108 on 23 May 2022. In June 2022, she had her first direct entry at the Wimbledon Championships, making her second major main draw.

Ranked No. 426 at the 2024 Țiriac Foundation Trophy in Bucharest, she qualified for the main draw and reached her first WTA 125 semifinal by defeating Simona Waltert, Aliona Bolsova and Marie Benoît. As a result, she moved close to 100 positions up in the singles rankings to No. 329, on 16 September 2024.

=== Doubles ===
She has won two doubles titles on the WTA Tour, at the 2021 Transylvania Open and at the 2022 Budapest Grand Prix, as well as seven WTA 125 doubles titles.

== Performance timelines ==
Key
W	F	SF	QF	#R	RR	Q#	DNQ	A	NH

(W) winner; (F) finalist; (SF) semifinalist; (QF) quarterfinalist; (#R) rounds 4, 3, 2, 1; (RR) round-robin stage; (Q#) qualification round; (DNQ) did not qualify; (A) absent; (NH) not held; (SR) strike rate (events won / competed); (W–L) win–loss record.
To avoid confusion and double counting, these charts are updated at the conclusion of a tournament or when the player's participation has ended.

=== Singles ===
Current through the 2026 US Open.

Tournament	2012	...	2018	2019	2020	2021	2022	2023	...	2026	SR	W–L
Grand Slam tournaments
Australian Open	A		A	Q1	Q1	Q1	Q2	Q1		Q1	0 / 0	0–0
French Open	A		A	Q2	Q1	1R	Q2	A		Q1	0 / 1	0–1
Wimbledon	A		A	Q2	NH	Q2	1R	A		Q2	0 / 1	0–1
US Open	A		Q2	Q1	A	Q1	Q1	A		Q3	0 / 0	0–0
Win–Loss	0–0		0–0	0–0	0–0	0–1	0–1	0–0		0–0	0 / 2	0–2
WTA 1000
Dubai / Qatar Open (Note: The first Premier 5 event of the year has switched back and forth between the Dubai Tennis Championships and the Qatar Ladies Open since 2009. Dubai was classified as a Premier 5 event from 2009 to 2011 before being succeeded by Doha for the 2012–2014 period. In 2015, Dubai regained its Premier 5 status while Doha was demoted to Premier status. The Premier 5 tournaments were reclassified as WTA 1000 tournaments in 2021.)	A		A	A	A	A	A	A		Q1	0 / 0	0–0
Indian Wells Open	A		A	A	NH	A	Q1	A		A	0 / 0	0–0
Miami Open	A		A	A	NH	A	1R	A		Q1	0 / 1	0–1
Madrid Open	A		A	A	NH	A	Q1	A		A	0 / 0	0–0
Italian Open	A		A	A	A	A	A	A		A	0 / 0	0–0
Career statistics
Tournaments	1		0	1	0	5	5	0			Career total: 12	
Overall win–loss	0–1		0–0	0–2	0–0	2–5	1–5	0–0			0 / 12	3–13
Year-end ranking	477		154	207	216	149	168	375			$857,937	

=== Doubles ===
Tournament	2022	2023	2024	SR	W–L
Grand Slam tournaments
Australian Open	1R	A	A	0 / 1	0–1
French Open	1R	A	A	0 / 1	0–1
Wimbledon	1R	A	A	0 / 1	0–1
US Open	1R	A	A	0 / 1	0–1
Win–Loss	0–4	0–0	0–0	0 / 4	0–4
WTA 1000
Dubai / Qatar Open	A	A	A	0 / 0	0–0
Indian Wells Open	1R	A	A	0 / 1	0–1
Miami Open	1R	A	A	0 / 1	0–1
Madrid Open	1R	A	A	0 / 1	0–1
Italian Open	A	A	A	0 / 0	0–0

== WTA Tour finals ==
=== Doubles: 3 (2 titles, 1 runner-up) ===
Legend WTA 500 WTA 250 (2–1)	Finals by surface Hard (1–0) Clay (1–1)

Result	W–L	Date	Tournament	Tier	Surface	Partner	Opponents	Score
Loss	0–1	Jul 2019	Palermo Ladies Open, Italy	International (Note: The WTA International tournaments were reclassified as WTA 250 tournaments in 2021.)	Clay	(Netherlands) Arantxa Rus	(Sweden) Cornelia Lister (Czech Republic) Renata Voráčová	6–7^{(2–7)}, 2–6
Win	1–1	Oct 2021	Transylvania Open, Romania	WTA 250	Hard (i)	(Romania) Irina Bara	(Serbia) Aleksandra Krunić (Netherlands) Lesley Pattinama Kerkhove	4–6, 6–1, [11–9]
Win	2–1	Jul 2022	Budapest Grand Prix, Hungary	WTA 250	Clay	(Georgia (country)) Oksana Kalashnikova	(Poland) Katarzyna Piter (Belgium) Kimberley Zimmermann	1–6, 6–4, [10–6]

== WTA 125 finals ==
=== Doubles: 12 (7 titles, 5 runner-ups) ===
Result	W–L	Date	Tournament	Surface	Partner	Opponents	Score
Loss	0–1	Jun 2021	Bol Open, Croatia	Clay	(Slovakia) Tereza Mihalíková	(Spain) Aliona Bolsova (Poland) Katarzyna Kawa	1–6, 6–4, [6–10]
Win	1–1	Sep 2021	Karlsruhe Open, Germany	Clay	(Romania) Irina Bara	(Poland) Katarzyna Piter (Egypt) Mayar Sherif	6–3, 2–6, [10–7]
Win	2–1	Nov 2021	Buenos Aires Open, Argentina	Clay	(Romania) Irina Bara	(Argentina) María Lourdes Carlé (Greece) Despina Papamichail	5–7, 7–5, [10–4]
Win	3–1	Nov 2021	Montevideo Open, Uruguay	Clay	(Romania) Irina Bara	(Brazil) Carolina Alves (Spain) Marina Bassols Ribera	6–4, 6–3
Win	4–1	Apr 2022	Marbella Open, Spain	Clay	(Romania) Irina Bara	(Germany) Vivian Heisen (Poland) Katarzyna Kawa	6–4, 3–6, [10–6]
Loss	4–2	Jul 2025	ATV Roma Open, Italy	Clay	(Latvia) Darja Semeņistaja	(Chinese Taipei) Cho I-hsuan (Chinese Taipei) Cho Yi-tsen	6–4, 4–6, [6–10]
Win	5–2	Oct 2025	Internazionali di Calabria, Italy	Clay	(Italy) Nicole Fossa Huergo	(Italy) Federica Urgesi (Italy) Aurora Zantedeschi	3–6, 6–1, [10–4]
Loss	5–3	Oct 2025	Rio Ladies Open, Brazil	Clay	(Spain) Irene Burillo	(Spain) Leyre Romero Gormaz (Croatia) Tara Würth	4–6, 1–6
Win	6–3	Oct 2025	Florianópolis Open, Brazil	Clay	(Spain) Irene Burillo	(France) Carole Monnet (Burundi) Sada Nahimana	6–1, 6–4
Loss	6–4	Nov 2025	Cali Open, Colombia	Clay	(Italy) Nicole Fossa Huergo	(Brazil) Ana Candiotto (Brazil) Laura Pigossi	3–6, 1–6
Loss	6–5	Jun 2026	Memorial Eugenio Fontana, Italy	Clay	(Switzerland) Naïma Karamoko	(Spain) Yvonne Cavallé Reimers (Belgium) Lara Salden	3–6, 4–6
Win	7–5	Sep 2026	Tolentino Open, Italy	Clay	(Greece) Despina Papamichail	(Czech Republic) Aneta Kučmová (Czech Republic) Aneta Laboutková	6–1, 6–2

== ITF Circuit finals ==
Legend
$100k tournaments
$80k tournaments
W50/60/75 tournaments
W40/50 tournaments
W25/35 tournaments
W10/15 tournaments

=== Singles: 38 (20 titles, 18 runner-ups) ===
Result	W–L	Date	Tournament	Tier	Surface	Opponent	Score
Loss	0–1	Sep 2006	ITF Tbilisi, Georgia	10,000	Hard	(Russia) Varvara Galanina	3–6, 4–6
Loss	0–2	Jun 2008	ITF Istanbul, Turkey	10,000	Hard	(Turkey) Pemra Özgen	4–6, 6–7^{(1)}
Loss	0–3	Oct 2008	ITF Barcelona, Spain	10,000	Clay	(France) Samantha Schoeffel	2–6, 1–6
Loss	0–4	Apr 2010	ITF Ain Sukhna, Egypt	10,000	Clay	(Russia) Marta Sirotkina	3–6, 1–6
Win	1–4	Jan 2011	ITF Mallorca, Spain	10,000	Clay	(Ukraine) Sofiya Kovalets	6–4, 6–2
Win	2–4	Mar 2011	ITF Antalya, Turkey	10,000	Clay	(Bulgaria) Isabella Shinikova	6–1, 6–3
Loss	2–5	Apr 2011	ITF Antalya, Turkey	10,000	Hard	(Russia) Yana Buchina	3–6, 4–6
Win	3–5	Aug 2012	ITF Rotterdam, Netherlands	10,000	Clay	(Netherlands) Lesley Kerkhove	7–6^{(5)}, 2–6, 6–4
Loss	3–6	Oct 2013	ITF Antalya, Turkey	10,000	Clay	(Russia) Anastasia Rudakova	1–6, 0–6
Loss	3–7	Nov 2013	ITF Antalya, Turkey	10,000	Clay	(Romania) Ana Bogdan	6–7^{(5)}, 6–7^{(5)}
Win	4–7	Nov 2013	ITF Antalya, Turkey	10,000	Clay	(Romania) Diana Buzean	4–6, 6–1, 6–4
Loss	4–8	Feb 2014	ITF Antalya, Turkey	10,000	Clay	(Georgia (country)) Sofia Kvatsabaia	6–2, 0–6, 4–6
Loss	4–9	Nov 2014	ITF Antalya, Turkey	10,000	Clay	(Hungary) Réka Luca Jani	4–6, 0–6
Loss	4–10	Jan 2015	ITF Antalya, Turkey	10,000	Clay	(Croatia) Iva Mekovec	4–6, 3–6
Win	5–10	Sep 2015	Telavi Open, Georgia	10,000	Clay	(Armenia) Ani Amiraghyan	5–7, 6–2, 6–2
Loss	5–11	Oct 2015	ITF Shymkent, Kazakhstan	10,000	Clay	(Kazakhstan) Kamila Kerimbayeva	2–6, 2–6
Win	6–11	Nov 2015	ITF Antalya, Turkey	10,000	Clay	(Russia) Elena Rybakina	7–5, 6–7^{(3)}, 6–3
Loss	6–12	Dec 2015	ITF Antalya, Turkey	10,000	Clay	(Romania) Elena Ruse	6–1, 6–7^{(3)}, 2–6
Win	7–12	Dec 2015	ITF Antalya, Turkey	10,000	Clay	(Turkey) Ayla Aksu	6–4, 6–2
Win	8–12	Jan 2016	ITF Antalya, Turkey	10,000	Clay	(Bulgaria) Viktoriya Tomova	6–4, 6–0
Loss	8–13	Jan 2016	ITF Antalya, Turkey	10,000	Clay	(North Macedonia) Lina Gjorcheska	6–1, 3–6, 2–6
Loss	8–14	Jun 2016	ITF Braunschweig, Germany	25,000	Clay	(Serbia) Nina Stojanović	4–6, 3–6
Win	9–14	Jul 2017	ITF Istanbul, Turkey	15,000	Clay	(United States) Sanaz Marand	6–2, 6–1
Win	10–14	Jul 2017	Telavi Open, Georgia	15,000	Clay	(Belgium) Margaux Bovy	6–2, 6–0
Win	11–14	Aug 2017	ITF Istanbul, Turkey	15,000	Clay	(Bulgaria) Gebriela Mihaylova	6–3, 6–1
Win	12–14	Dec 2017	ITF Castellón, Spain	15,000	Clay	(Spain) Estrella Cabeza Candela	6–0, 3–6, 6–1
Win	13–14	May 2018	ITF Tbilisi, Georgia	25,000	Hard	(Netherlands) Lesley Kerkhove	6–4, 6–4
Win	14–14	Jul 2018	President's Cup, Kazakhstan	80,000	Hard	(Uzbekistan) Sabina Sharipova	6–4, 6–1
Win	15–14	Aug 2018	Ladies Open Hechingen, Germany	60,000	Clay	(Germany) Laura Siegemund	6–2, 6–1
Win	16–14	Sep 2019	ITF Frýdek-Místek, Czech Republic	W25	Clay	(Germany) Katharina Gerlach	6–1, 7–6^{(6)}
Win	17–14	Aug 2021	Kozerki Open, Poland	W60	Clay	(France) Chloé Paquet	7–6^{(7)}, 0–6, 6–4
Loss	17–15	Apr 2022	Bellinzona Ladies Open, Switzerland	W60	Clay	(Cyprus) Raluca Șerban	3–6, 0–6
Loss	17–16	May 2022	Prague Open, Czech Republic	W60	Clay	(Poland) Maja Chwalińska	5–7, 3–6
Win	18–16	May 2023	ITF Kachreti, Georgia	W25	Hard	(United Kingdom) Anna Brogan	6–2, 6–2
Loss	18–17	Apr 2025	Koper Open, Slovenia	W75	Clay	(Austria) Julia Grabher	2–6, 2–6
Win	19–17	Apr 2025	ITF Lopota, Georgia	W50	Hard	(Poland) Linda Klimovičová	6–4, 7–5
Loss	19–18	Apr 2025	ITF Lopota 2	W50	Hard	(United States) Carol Young Suh Lee	7–6^{(7)}, 6–7^{(3)}, 4–6
Win	20–18	Jul 2026	Schönbusch Open, Germany	W100	Clay	(Ukraine) Anastasiia Sobolieva	6–0, 1–0 ret.

=== Doubles: 57 (38 titles, 19 runner-ups) ===
Result	W–L	Date	Tournament	Tier	Surface	Partner	Opponents	Score
Win	1–0	Apr 2011	ITF Antalya, Turkey	10k	Clay	(Romania) Laura Ioana Andrei	(Russia) Alexandra Romanova (Russia) Maria Zharkova	6–1, 7–5
Loss	1–1	Sep 2011	Telavi Open, Georgia	50k	Clay	(Italy) Anastasia Grymalska	(Romania) Elena Bogdan (Romania) Mihaela Buzărnescu	6–1, 1–6, [3–10]
Win	2–1	Feb 2012	Rancho Mirage Open, US	25k	Hard	(Georgia (country)) Sofia Shapatava	(Russia) Valeria Solovyeva (Slovakia) Lenka Wienerová	6–2, 3–6, [10–6]
Win	3–1	Mar 2012	ITF Clearwater, US	25k	Hard	(Ukraine) Alyona Sotnikova	(United Kingdom) Naomi Broady (United Kingdom) Heather Watson	6–3, 6–2
Win	4–1	May 2012	Grado Tennis Cup, Italy	25k	Clay	(Georgia (country)) Margalita Chakhnashvili	(Italy) Claudia Giovine (Italy) Anastasia Grymalska	7–6^{(7–2)}, 7–6^{(7–1)}
Win	5–1	Aug 2012	ITF Ratingen, Germany	10k	Clay	(Georgia (country)) Sofia Kvatsabaia	(Germany) Kim Grajdek (Poland) Sylwia Zagórska	6–3, 6–4
Win	6–1	Aug 2012	ITF Enschede, Netherlands	10k	Clay	(Georgia (country)) Sofia Kvatsabaia	(Netherlands) Kim Kilsdonk (Netherlands) Nicolette van Uitert	6–4, 1–6, [10–6]
Loss	6–2	Dec 2012	ITF Istanbul, Turkey	10k	Hard (i)	(Georgia (country)) Sofia Kvatsabaia	(Belarus) Lidziya Marozava (Russia) Ekaterina Yashina	3–6, 2–6
Loss	6–3	Feb 2013	ITF Antalya, Turkey	10k	Clay	(Georgia (country)) Sofia Kvatsabaia	(Serbia) Teodora Mirčić (Romania) Raluca Elena Platon	6–1, 5–4 ret.
Loss	6–4	Oct 2013	ITF Antalya, Turkey	10k	Clay	(Austria) Pia König	(Romania) Diana Buzean (Romania) Raluca Elena Platon	6–3, 3–6, [5–10]
Win	7–4	Mar 2014	ITF Antalya, Turkey	10k	Hard	(Georgia (country)) Sofia Kvatsabaia	(Serbia) Natalija Kostić (Slovakia) Chantal Škamlová	4–6, 6–1, [10–8]
Loss	7–5	May 2014	ITF Caserta, Italy	10k	Clay	(Georgia (country)) Sofia Kvatsabaia	(Australia) Samantha Harris (Australia) Sally Peers	3–6, 6–7^{(6)}
Win	8–5	Nov 2014	ITF Antalya, Turkey	10k	Clay	(Ukraine) Alona Fomina	(Serbia) Natalija Kostić (Slovakia) Chantal Škamlová	w/o
Win	9–5	Nov 2014	ITF Antalya, Turkey	10k	Clay	(Georgia (country)) Sofia Kvatsabaia	(Hungary) Réka Luca Jani (Bulgaria) Julia Stamatova	7–6^{(3)}, 7–6^{(7)}
Loss	9–6	Dec 2014	ITF Antalya, Turkey	10k	Hard	(Slovenia) Nastja Kolar	(Georgia (country)) Sofia Kvatsabaia (Slovakia) Chantal Škamlová	w/o
Win	10–6	Dec 2014	Ankara Cup, Turkey	50k	Hard (i)	(Slovenia) Nastja Kolar	(Ukraine) Oleksandra Korashvili (Bulgaria) Elitsa Kostova	6–4, 7–6^{(5)}
Loss	10–7	Jan 2015	ITF Antalya, Turkey	10k	Clay	(Georgia (country)) Sofia Kvatsabaia	(Turkey) Melis Sezer (South Africa) Chanel Simmonds	4–6, 6–4, [4–10]
Win	11–7	Jan 2015	ITF Antalya, Turkey	10k	Clay	(Georgia (country)) Sofia Kvatsabaia	(Poland) Agata Barańska (France) Victoria Muntean	6–2, 6–2
Win	12–7	Feb 2015	ITF Antalya, Turkey	10k	Clay	(Russia) Victoria Kan	(Sweden) Cornelia Lister (Ukraine) Alyona Sotnikova	6–1, 6–0
Win	13–7	Mar 2015	ITF Seville, Spain	25k	Clay	(Russia) Victoria Kan	(Austria) Sandra Klemenschits (Germany) Dinah Pfizenmaier	6–3, 6–2
Win	14–7	May 2015	ITF Caserta, Italy	25k	Clay	(Georgia (country)) Sofia Shapatava	(Italy) Alice Matteucci (Turkey) İpek Soylu	6–0, 7–6^{(6)}
Win	15–7	May 2015	Maribor Open, Slovenia	25k	Clay	(Slovenia) Nastja Kolar	(Czech Republic) Petra Krejsová (Czech Republic) Kateřina Vaňková	6–2, 6–4
Loss	15–8	Jun 2015	ITF Helsingborg, Sweden	25k	Clay	(Sweden) Cornelia Lister	(Turkey) Pemra Özgen (United States) Bernarda Pera	2–6, 0–6
Win	16–8	Jun 2015	Bella Cup Toruń, Poland	25k	Clay	(Georgia (country)) Sofia Shapatava	(Poland) Magdalena Fręch (Philippines) Katharina Lehnert	6–4, 6–4
Win	17–8	Sep 2015	ITF Bucha, Ukraine	25k	Clay	(Georgia (country)) Sofia Shapatava	(Ukraine) Olga Ianchuk (Ukraine) Anastasiya Vasylyeva	7–5, 6–2
Win	18–8	Oct 2015	ITF Shymkent, Kazakhstan	10k	Clay	(Georgia (country)) Sofia Kvatsabaia	(Uzbekistan) Albina Khabibulina (Uzbekistan) Polina Merenkova	7–5, 3–6, [10–6]
Win	19–8	Oct 2015	ITF Shymkent, Kazakhstan	10k	Clay	(Georgia (country)) Sofia Kvatsabaia	(Kazakhstan) Kamila Kerimbayeva (Russia) Margarita Lazareva	7–5, 6–2
Loss	19–9	Jan 2016	ITF Antalya, Turkey	10k	Clay	(Georgia (country)) Sofia Kvatsabaia	(Hungary) Ágnes Bukta (Austria) Julia Grabher	6–1, 4–6, [9–11]
Finalist (Note: Final was cancelled due to the 2016 Turkish coup d'état attempt.)	–NP–	Jul 2016	Bursa Cup, Turkey	50k	Clay	(Georgia (country)) Sofia Shapatava	(Uzbekistan) Akgul Amanmuradova (Russia) Natela Dzalamidze	cancelled
Win	20–9	Feb 2017	ITF Antalya, Turkey	15k	Clay	(Turkey) Ayla Aksu	(Turkey) Başak Eraydın (Switzerland) Karin Kennel	6–3, 6–1
Loss	20–10	May 2017	ITF Rome, Italy	25k	Clay	(Norway) Melanie Stokke	(Japan) Eri Hozumi (Japan) Miyu Kato	1–6, 4–6
Win	21–10	Jul 2017	ITF Istanbul, Turkey	15k	Clay	(Georgia (country)) Mariam Bolkvadze	(Bulgaria) Petia Arshinkova (Turkey) İpek Öz	6–1, 6–3
Loss	21–11	Jul 2017	Telavi Open, Georgia	15k	Clay	(Georgia (country)) Mariam Bolkvadze	(Belarus) Polina Pekhova (Belarus) Maria Solnyshkina	2–6, 6–1, [7–10]
Win	22–11	Feb 2018	ITF Antalya, Turkey	10k	Hard	(Bosnia and Herzegovina) Dea Herdželaš	(Italy) Martina Caregaro (Italy) Federica di Sarra	6–2, 6–4
Win	23–11	Mar 2018	ITF Santa Margherita di Pula, Italy	25k	Clay	(Georgia (country)) Sofia Shapatava	(Germany) Katharina Gerlach (Germany) Lena Rüffer	6–4, 7–6^{(5)}
Win	24–11	Jun 2018	ITF Klosters, Switzerland	25k	Clay	(Uzbekistan) Akgul Amanmuradova	(Czech Republic) Lucie Hradecká (Japan) Yuki Naito	6–2, 6–3
Loss	24–12	Jul 2018	President's Cup, Kazakhstan	80k	Hard	(Uzbekistan) Akgul Amanmuradova	(Turkey) Berfu Cengiz (Kazakhstan) Anna Danilina	6–3, 3–6, [7–10]
Loss	24–13	Mar 2019	ITF Curitiba, Brazil	W25	Clay	(Chile) Daniela Seguel	(Brazil) Paula Cristina Gonçalves (Brazil) Luisa Stefani	7–6^{(3)}, 6–7^{(0)}, [2–10]
Win	25–13	Sep 2019	Open de Saint-Malo, France	W60	Clay	(Belgium) Maryna Zanevska	(Spain) Aliona Bolsova (Croatia) Tereza Mrdeža	6–7^{(8)}, 7–5, [10–8]
Win	26–13	Nov 2019	Open Nantes Atlantique, France	W60	Hard (i)	(Uzbekistan) Akgul Amanmuradova	(Russia) Yana Sizikova (Germany) Vivian Heisen	7–6^{(2)}, 6–3
Loss	26–14	Feb 2020	Open Andrézieux-Bouthéon, France	W60	Hard (i)	(Cyprus) Raluca Șerban	(Romania) Jaqueline Cristian (Romania) Elena-Gabriela Ruse	6–7^{(6)}, 7–6^{(4)}, [8–10]
Win	27–14	Dec 2020	Dubai Tennis Challenge, UAE	W100	Hard	(India) Ankita Raina	(Spain) Aliona Bolsova (Slovenia) Kaja Juvan	6–4, 3–6, [10–6]
Win	28–14	Apr 2021	Bellinzona Ladies Open, Switzerland	W60	Clay	(Kazakhstan) Anna Danilina	(Canada) Rebecca Marino (Japan) Yuki Naito	7–5, 6–3
Win	29–14	Sep 2021	Internacional de Valencia, Spain	W80	Clay	(Belgium) Ysaline Bonaventure	(Spain) Ángela Fita Boluda (Russia) Oksana Selekhmeteva	6–2, 2–6, [10–6]
Loss	29–15	Sep 2021	Open de Valencia, Spain	W80	Clay	(Brazil) Laura Pigossi	(Spain) Aliona Bolsova (Venezuela) Andrea Gámiz	3–6, 4–6
Win	30–15	Feb 2023	Porto Indoor, Portugal	W40	Hard (i)	(Spain) Leyre Romero Gormaz	(Portugal) Matilde Jorge (Croatia) Tara Würth	6–4, 2–6, [11–9]
Loss	30–16	Mar 2023	ITF Palmanova, Spain	W25	Clay	(Belarus) Iryna Shymanovich	(Portugal) Francisca Jorge (Portugal) Matilde Jorge	1–6, 6–3, [8–10]
Loss	30–17	Mar 2023	ITF Palmanova, Spain	W25	Clay	(Belarus) Iryna Shymanovich	(Portugal) Francisca Jorge (Portugal) Matilde Jorge	6–4, 3–6, [8–10]
Win	31–17	May 2023	ITF Tbilisi, Georgia	W40	Hard	(India) Ankita Raina	(Russia) Anastasia Zakharova (Russia) Anastasia Zolotareva	4–6, 6–2, [10–6]
Win	32–17	Jun 2023	ITF Otočec, Slovenia	W40	Clay	(United States) Elvina Kalieva	(Canada) Kayla Cross (United States) Sofia Sewing	6–2, 6–3
Loss	32–18	Aug 2023	Ladies Open Hechingen, Germany	W60	Clay	(Germany) Katharina Hobgarski	(Russia) Alena Fomina-Klotz (North Macedonia) Lina Gjorcheska	2–6, 4–6
Win	33–18	Aug 2023	ITF Wroclaw, Poland	W40	Clay	(Slovenia) Dalila Jakupović	(Poland) Weronika Ewald (Poland) Daria Kuczer	6–4, 4–6, [10–7]
Win	34–18	Sep 2023	ITF Santa Margherita di Pula, Italy	W25	Clay	(Germany) Katharina Hobgarski	(Spain) Yvonne Cavallé Reimers (Italy) Aurora Zantedeschi	6–2, 6–4
Win	35–18	May 2024	ITF Otočec, Slovenia	W50	Clay	(Ukraine) Valeriya Strakhova	(Australia) Maya Joint (United States) Rasheeda McAdoo	3–6, 6–4, [10–5]
Win	36–18	Jun 2024	ITF Otočec, Slovenia	W50	Clay	(Ukraine) Valeriya Strakhova	(Russia) Anastasiia Gureva (Russia) Anastasia Kovaleva	4–6, 6–2, [10–4]
Win	37–18	Aug 2024	ITF Leipzig, Germany	W35	Clay	(Germany) Katharina Hobgarski	(Czech Republic) Denisa Hindová (Czech Republic) Julie Štruplová	6–2, 3–6, [10–8]
Loss	37–19	Sep 2024	ITF Slobozia, Romania	W50	Clay	(Romania) Irina Bara	(Romania) Briana Szabó (Romania) Patricia Maria Țig	4–6, 5–7
Win	38–19	Mar 2025	Kiskút Open, Hungary	W75	Clay (i)	(Romania) Irina Bara	(Hungary) Luca Udvardy (Hungary) Panna Udvardy	6–7^{(7)}, 6–3, [10–3]
