= 2022 President's Cup – Women's singles =

Women's singles
- 2022 President's Cup

Final
- Champion: (Japan) Moyuka Uchijima
- Runner-up: (Serbia) Natalija Stevanović
- Score: 6–3, 7–6^{(7–2)}

Events
Singles	men	women
Doubles	men	women
← 2021 ·	President's Cup	· 2023 →

Mariam Bolkvadze was the defending champion but lost to Daria Kudashova in the first round.

Moyuka Uchijima won the title, defeating Natalija Stevanović in the final, 6–3, 7–6^{(7–2)}.

== Seeds ==
1. Vitalia Diatchenko (quarterfinals)
2. (Japan) Moyuka Uchijima (champion)
3. (Georgia (country)) Mariam Bolkvadze (first round)
4. (South Korea) Han Na-lae (semifinals)
5. (Serbia) Natalija Stevanović (final)
6. Valeria Savinykh (second round)
7. (South Korea) Park So-hyun (first round)
8. Ekaterina Kazionova (second round)

== Draw ==
=== Key ===
- Q = Qualifier
- WC = Wild card
- LL = Lucky loser
- Alt = Alternate
- ITF = ITF entry
- PR = Protected ranking
- SR = Special ranking
- SE = Special exempt
- JE = Junior exempt
- JR = Junior Accelerator Programme entrant
- CO = College Accelerator Programme entrant
- NG = Next Gen Accelerator Program entrant
- w/o = Walkover
- r = Retired
- d = Defaulted

=== Finals ===
Semifinals
5	(Serbia) Natalija Stevanović	7	3	7^{7}
4	(South Korea) Han Na-lae	5	6	6^{3}
Q	Sofya Lansere	6	5	2
2	(Japan) Moyuka Uchijima	2	7	6

Final
5	(Serbia) Natalija Stevanović	3	6^{2}
2	(Japan) Moyuka Uchijima	6	7^{7}

=== Top half ===
First round
1	V Diatchenko	7^{7}	7^{7}
(Japan) N Hanatani	6^{4}	6^{4}
V Lapko	6	6
WC	(Kazakhstan) A Sagandikova	3	3
WC	(Kazakhstan) S Kenzhibayeva	1	2
P Kudermetova	6	6
(India) A Raina	6^{4}	6	2
5	(Serbia) N Stevanović	7^{7}	3	6
4	(South Korea) N-l Han	6	6
A Kubareva	3	2
(Israel) S Kimchi	1	6	3
(Kazakhstan) Z Kulambayeva	6	1	6
WC	(Kazakhstan) A Arystanbekova	3	4
WC	(Kazakhstan) G Ainitdinova	6	6
A Zolotareva	7	3	7
7	(South Korea) S-h Park	5	6	5

Second round
1	V Diatchenko	6	6
V Lapko	3	2
P Kudermetova	3	4
5	(Serbia) N Stevanović	6	6
4	(South Korea) N-l Han	6	6
(Kazakhstan) Z Kulambayeva	1	2
WC	(Kazakhstan) G Ainitdinova	1	5
A Zolotareva	6	7

Quarterfinals
1	V Diatchenko	3	3
5	(Serbia) N Stevanović	6	6
4	(South Korea) N-l Han	6	6
A Zolotareva	3	1

Semifinals
5	(Serbia) N Stevanović	7	3	7^{7}
4	(South Korea) N-l Han	5	6	6^{3}

=== Bottom half ===
First round
8	E Kazionova	2	6	6
Q	E Maklakova	6	2	2
Q	T Barkova	6	3	3
Q	S Lansere	3	6	6
(Japan) C Muramatsu	4	1
(Slovakia) V Morvayová	6	6
Q	D Kudashova	3	6	6
3	(Georgia (country)) M Bolkvadze	6	3	2
6	V Savinykh	1	6	6
(Turkey) B Cengiz	6	0	1
Q	(Hong Kong) C Wong H-y	0	1
M Tkacheva	6	6
Q	D Shakirova	0	2
Q	(Japan) M Kobori	6	6
Q	K Pavlova	5	0
2	(Japan) M Uchijima	7	6

Second round
8	E Kazionova	2	1
Q	S Lansere	6	6
(Slovakia) V Morvayová	6	1	4
Q	D Kudashova	4	6	6
6	V Savinykh	1	6	2
M Tkacheva	6	1	6
Q	(Japan) M Kobori	3	5
2	(Japan) M Uchijima	6	7

Quarterfinals
Q	S Lansere	6	5	7^{7}
Q	D Kudashova	2	7	6^{3}
M Tkacheva	1	2
2	(Japan) M Uchijima	6	6

Semifinals
Q	S Lansere	6	5	2
2	(Japan) M Uchijima	2	7	6
