= 2023 President's Cup – Men's doubles =

Men's doubles
- 2023 President's Cup

Final
- Champions: (India) S D Prajwal Dev (India) Niki Kaliyanda Poonacha
- Runners-up: (Japan) Toshihide Matsui (Japan) Kaito Uesugi
- Score: 6–3, 7–6^{(7–4)}

Events
Singles	men	women
Doubles	men	women
← 2022 ·	President's Cup	· 2024 →

Nam Ji-sung and Song Min-kyu were the defending champions but chose not to defend their title.

S D Prajwal Dev and Niki Kaliyanda Poonacha won the title after defeating Toshihide Matsui and Kaito Uesugi 6–3, 7–6^{(7–4)} in the final.

== Seeds ==
1. (Japan) Toshihide Matsui / (Japan) Kaito Uesugi (final)
2. (Zimbabwe) Benjamin Lock / (New Zealand) Rubin Statham (semifinals)
3. (Austria) Neil Oberleitner / (Japan) Seita Watanabe (quarterfinals)
4. (Kazakhstan) Grigoriy Lomakin / (New Zealand) Ajeet Rai (quarterfinals)

== Draw ==
Key

- Q = Qualifier
- WC = Wild card
- LL = Lucky loser
- Alt = Alternate
- ITF = ITF entry
- PR = Protected ranking
- SR = Special ranking
- SE = Special exempt
- JE = Junior exempt
- JR = Junior Accelerator Programme entrant
- CO = College Accelerator Programme entrant
- NG = Next Gen Accelerator Program entrant
- w/o = Walkover
- r = Retired
- d = Defaulted

First round
1	(Japan) T Matsui (Japan) K Uesugi	6	6
(India) S Banthia (India) Sai Karteek Reddy Ganta	1	4
(Uzbekistan) D Istomin; E Karlovskiy	4	6	[10]
(France) R Bertrand (Israel) Orel Kimhi	6	1	[8]
3	(Austria) N Oberleitner (Japan) S Watanabe	6	6
(Georgia (country)) S Purtseladze (Georgia (country)) Z Tkemaladze	4	0
WC	E Gerasimov (Kazakhstan) D Yevseyev	6	6
(Poland) F Peliwo (Japan) Y Takahashi	1	4
WC	(Kazakhstan) Arslanbek Aitkulov (Kazakhstan) Islam Orynbasar	1	4
(India) SDP Dev (India) N Kaliyanda Poonacha	6	6
(United States) A Ayeni (Turkey) Y Erel	4	6^{3}
4	(Kazakhstan) G Lomakin (New Zealand) A Rai	6	7^{7}
(India) Parikshit Somani (Uzbekistan) K Sultanov	6	6
E Agafonov (Uzbekistan) S Fayziev	2	1
Aliaksandr Liaonenka; A Zgirovsky	5	4
2	(Zimbabwe) B Lock (New Zealand) R Statham	7	6

Quarterfinals
1	(Japan) T Matsui (Japan) K Uesugi	6	7^{7}
(Uzbekistan) D Istomin; E Karlovskiy	4	6^{5}
3	(Austria) N Oberleitner (Japan) S Watanabe	1	6	[6]
WC	E Gerasimov (Kazakhstan) D Yevseyev	6	2	[10]
(India) SDP Dev (India) N Kaliyanda Poonacha	4	6	[10]
4	(Kazakhstan) G Lomakin (New Zealand) A Rai	6	4	[6]
(India) P Somani (Uzbekistan) K Sultanov	1	6	[7]
2	(Zimbabwe) B Lock (New Zealand) R Statham	6	3	[10]

Semifinals
1	(Japan) T Matsui (Japan) K Uesugi	6	6^{5}	[10]
WC	E Gerasimov (Kazakhstan) D Yevseyev	0	7^{7}	[4]
(India) SDP Dev (India) N Kaliyanda Poonacha	6	7^{9}
2	(Zimbabwe) B Lock (New Zealand) R Statham	1	6^{7}

Final
1	(Japan) T Matsui (Japan) K Uesugi	3	6^{4}
(India) SDP Dev (India) N Kaliyanda Poonacha	6	7^{7}
