= 2026 Antalya Challenger 1 =

- Date: 24 February – 1 March
- Edition: 5th
- Category: WTA 125
- Draw: 32S/16D
- Surface: Clay
- Location: Antalya, Turkey

Champions

Singles
- (Japan) Moyuka Uchijima

Doubles
- Maria Kozyreva / Iryna Shymanovich
- Antalya Challenger

The 2026 Antalya Open 1 (also known as the Megasaray Hotels Open for sponsorship reasons) was a professional women's tennis tournament played on outdoor clay courts. It was the fifth edition of the tournament and the first in a series of three WTA 125 tournaments played at the same venue in consecutive weeks in 2026. It took place at the Megasaray Tennis Academy in Antalya, Turkey, between 24 February and 1 March 2026.

== Singles main-draw entrants ==
=== Seeds ===
Country	Player	Rank^{1}	Seed
UKR	Oleksandra Oliynykova	71	1
AUT	Julia Grabher	81	2
JPN	Moyuka Uchijima	90	3
HUN	Panna Udvardy	93	4
EGY	Mayar Sherif	108	5
SLO	Veronika Erjavec	112	6
NED	Arantxa Rus	135	7
ITA	Lucia Bronzetti	140	8

- ^{1} Rankings as of 16 February 2026.

=== Other entrants ===
The following players received wildcards into the singles main draw:

- (Turkey) Ada Kumru
- (Latvia) Adelina Lachinova
- (Turkey) İpek Öz
- (Turkey) İlay Yörük

The following players received entry from the qualifying draw:

- Alevtina Ibragimova
- (Italy) Dalila Spiteri
- (Ukraine) Katarina Zavatska
- Anastasia Zolotareva

The following players received entry as a lucky losers:

- Iryna Shymanovich
- (Hungary) Amarissa Tóth

=== Withdrawals ===
Before the tournament

- (Czech Republic) Sára Bejlek → replaced by (France) Séléna Janicijevic
- (Italy) Lisa Pigato → replaced by (France) Alice Ramé
- Elena Pridankina → replaced by Anastasia Gasanova
- (France) Tiantsoa Rakotomanga Rajaonah → replaced by Iryna Shymanovich (LL)
- (Slovenia) Tamara Zidanšek → replaced by (Hungary) Amarissa Tóth (LL)

=== Retirements ===
- (Austria) Julia Grabher (lower leg injury)
- (France) Alice Ramé (illness)

== Doubles main-draw entrants ==
=== Seeds ===
Country	Player	Country	Player	Rank^{1}	Seed
	Maria Kozyreva		Iryna Shymanovich	136	1
CZE	Jesika Malečková	CZE	Miriam Škoch	138	2
JPN	Momoko Kobori	THA	Peangtarn Plipuech	221	3
FRA	Estelle Cascino	ARG	Nicole Fossa Huergo	228	4

- ^{1} Rankings as of 16 February 2026.

=== Other entrants ===
The following pair received a wildcard into the doubles main draw:

- (Turkey) Ada Kumru / (Turkey) İpek Öz

The following pair received entry as an alternate:

- Anastasia Gasanova / Ekaterina Ovcharenko

=== Withdrawals ===
- (Brazil) Laura Pigossi / (Slovenia) Tamara Zidanšek → replaced by Anastasia Gasanova / Ekaterina Ovcharenko

== Champions ==
=== Singles ===
- (Japan) Moyuka Uchijima def. (Ukraine) Anhelina Kalinina 7–5, 7–5

=== Doubles ===
- Maria Kozyreva / Iryna Shymanovich def. (Japan) Momoko Kobori / (Thailand) Peangtarn Plipuech 7–5, 6–1
