= 2023 President's Cup – Men's singles =

Men's singles
- 2023 President's Cup

Final
- Champion: (Kazakhstan) Denis Yevseyev
- Runner-up: (Uzbekistan) Khumoyun Sultanov
- Score: 7–5, 2–6, 6–4

Events
Singles	men	women
Doubles	men	women
← 2022 ·	President's Cup	· 2024 →

Roman Safiullin was the defending champion but chose not to defend his title.

Denis Yevseyev won the title after defeating Khumoyun Sultanov 7–5, 2–6, 6–4 in the final.

== Seeds ==
1. (Kazakhstan) Mikhail Kukushkin (quarterfinals)
2. (Zimbabwe) Benjamin Lock (quarterfinals)
3. (Kazakhstan) Denis Yevseyev (champion)
4. (Kazakhstan) Dmitry Popko (second round, retired)
5. (Poland) Filip Peliwo (second round)
6. (Turkey) Yankı Erel (semifinals)
7. (United States) Alafia Ayeni (first round)
8. (Georgia (country)) Saba Purtseladze (first round)

== Draw ==
Key

- Q = Qualifier
- WC = Wild card
- LL = Lucky loser
- Alt = Alternate
- ITF = ITF entry
- PR = Protected ranking
- SR = Special ranking
- SE = Special exempt
- JE = Junior exempt
- JR = Junior Accelerator Programme entrant
- CO = College Accelerator Programme entrant
- NG = Next Gen Accelerator Program entrant
- w/o = Walkover
- r = Retired
- d = Defaulted

=== Finals ===
Semifinals
Evgeny Karlovskiy	3	1
(Uzbekistan) Khumoyun Sultanov	6	6
3	(Kazakhstan) Denis Yevseyev	6	6
6	(Turkey) Yankı Erel	4	4

Final
(Uzbekistan) Khumoyun Sultanov	5	6	4
3	(Kazakhstan) Denis Yevseyev	7	2	6

=== Top half ===
First round
1	(Kazakhstan) M Kukushkin	6	6
PR	E Tiurnev	2	0
(India) Digvijaypratap Singh	3	4
(Japan) Renta Tokuda	6	6
Q	(India) K Singh	6^{2}	2
E Karlovskiy	7^{7}	6
WC	(Kazakhstan) Timur Maulenov	6^{4}	1
5	(Poland) F Peliwo	7^{7}	6
4	(Kazakhstan) D Popko	6	4	6
WC	(Turkey) K Kırcı	4	6	1
(Uzbekistan) K Sultanov	7^{7}	6
(Japan) Shuichi Sekiguchi	6^{5}	4
(Sweden) L Borg	5	4
Q	E Gerasimov	7	6
Q	Evgeny Philippov	7^{7}	6
7	(United States) A Ayeni	6^{4}	2

Second round
1	(Kazakhstan) M Kukushkin	6	6
(Japan) R Tokuda	1	3
E Karlovskiy	6	6
5	(Poland) F Peliwo	3	4
4	(Kazakhstan) D Popko	7^{7}	0	1^{r}
(Uzbekistan) K Sultanov	6^{4}	6	2
Q	E Gerasimov	5	5
Q	E Philippov	7	7

Quarterfinals
1	(Kazakhstan) M Kukushkin	4	6	2
E Karlovskiy	6	4	6
(Uzbekistan) K Sultanov	5	6	6
Q	E Philippov	7	4	4

Semifinals
E Karlovskiy	3	1
(Uzbekistan) K Sultanov	6	6

=== Bottom half ===
First round
8	(Georgia (country)) S Purtseladze	6	5	5
Q	A Zgirovsky	3	7	7
(Austria) N Oberleitner	6	6
Q	(India) Sidharth Rawat	1	2
(France) R Bertrand	2	6	4
(Israel) Orel Kimhi	6	1	6
(New Zealand) A Rai	4	1
3	(Kazakhstan) D Yevseyev	6	6
6	(Turkey) Y Erel	6	6^{5}	6
Alt	(Georgia (country)) Z Tkemaladze	4	7^{7}	1
(New Zealand) R Statham	6	6
Q	(India) N Kaliyanda Poonacha	1	4
(India) SDP Dev	4	6	3
WC	(Kazakhstan) Islam Orynbasar	6	1	6
(Japan) Y Takahashi	5	4
2	(Zimbabwe) B Lock	7	6

Second round
Q	A Zgirovsky	7^{7}	6
(Austria) N Oberleitner	6^{3}	2
(Israel) O Kimhi	5	1
3	(Kazakhstan) D Yevseyev	7	6
6	(Turkey) Y Erel	1	6	6
(New Zealand) R Statham	6	3	4
WC	(Kazakhstan) I Orynbasar	2	3
2	(Zimbabwe) B Lock	6	6

Quarterfinals
Q	A Zgirovsky	2	4
3	(Kazakhstan) D Yevseyev	6	6
6	(Turkey) Y Erel	6	7^{7}
2	(Zimbabwe) B Lock	3	6^{4}

Semifinals
3	(Kazakhstan) D Yevseyev	6	6
6	(Turkey) Y Erel	4	4
