= 2026 Antalya Challenger 1 – Doubles =

Doubles
- 2026 Antalya Challenger 1

Final
- Champions: Maria Kozyreva; Iryna Shymanovich
- Runners-up: (Japan) Momoko Kobori (Thailand) Peangtarn Plipuech
- Score: 7–5, 6–1

Events
Singles	Doubles
- Antalya Challenger

Anna Bondár and Simona Waltert were the defending champions, but chose not to participate.

Maria Kozyreva and Iryna Shymanovich won the title, defeating Momoko Kobori and Peangtarn Plipuech 7–5, 6–1 in the final.

== Seeds ==
1. Maria Kozyreva / Iryna Shymanovich (champions)
2. (Czech Republic) Jesika Malečková / (Czech Republic) Miriam Škoch (semifinals)
3. (Japan) Momoko Kobori / (Thailand) Peangtarn Plipuech (final)
4. (France) Estelle Cascino / (Argentina) Nicole Fossa Huergo (first round)

== Draw ==
Key

- Q = Qualifier
- WC = Wild card
- LL = Lucky loser
- Alt = Alternate
- ITF = ITF entry
- PR = Protected ranking
- SR = Special ranking
- SE = Special exempt
- JE = Junior exempt
- JR = Junior Accelerator Programme entrant
- CO = College Accelerator Programme entrant
- NG = Next Gen Accelerator Program entrant
- w/o = Walkover
- r = Retired
- d = Defaulted

=== Draw ===
First round
1	M Kozyreva; I Shymanovich	6	6
(Slovenia) D Jakupović (Slovenia) N Radišić	3	1
(Greece) D Papamichail (Egypt) M Sherif	6	6
(Romania) I Bara (Georgia (country)) E Gorgodze	4	3
4	(France) E Cascino (Argentina) N Fossa Huergo	6	3	[8]
(Argentina) J Riera (Spain) L Romero Gormaz	2	6	[10]
(Netherlands) L Tran; A Zolotareva	6	6
(Japan) H Kuwata (China) Q Ye	2	2
(Italy) L Bronzetti (Japan) M Uchijima	7	3	[7]
(United Kingdom) A Barnett (France) E Lechemia	5	6	[10]
WC	(Turkey) A Kumru (Turkey) İ Öz	6^{4}	5
3	(Japan) M Kobori (Thailand) P Plipuech	7^{7}	7
(Slovenia) V Erjavec (Hungary) P Udvardy	7^{7}	6
Alt	A Gasanova; E Ovcharenko	6^{5}	3
(France) C Monnet (Netherlands) A Rus	4	3
2	(Czech Republic) J Malečková (Czech Republic) M Škoch	6	6

Quarterfinals
1	M Kozyreva; I Shymanovich	6	6
(Greece) D Papamichail (Egypt) M Sherif	3	3
(Argentina) J Riera (Spain) L Romero Gormaz	4	6	[10]
(Netherlands) L Tran; A Zolotareva	6	3	[8]
(United Kingdom) A Barnett (France) E Lechemia	2	6	[6]
3	(Japan) M Kobori (Thailand) P Plipuech	6	2	[10]
(Slovenia) V Erjavec (Hungary) P Udvardy	4	3
2	(Czech Republic) J Malečková (Czech Republic) M Škoch	6	6

Semifinals
1	M Kozyreva; I Shymanovich	6	6
(Argentina) J Riera (Spain) L Romero Gormaz	2	3
3	(Japan) M Kobori (Thailand) P Plipuech	6	7^{7}
2	(Czech Republic) J Malečková (Czech Republic) M Škoch	4	6^{4}

Final
1	M Kozyreva; I Shymanovich	7	6
3	(Japan) M Kobori (Thailand) P Plipuech	5	1
