= 2022 President's Cup – Women's doubles =

Women's doubles
- 2022 President's Cup

Final
- Champions: Mariia Tkacheva; Anastasia Zolotareva
- Runners-up: (Japan) Momoko Kobori (Japan) Moyuka Uchijima
- Score: 4–6, 6–1, [10–4]

Events
Singles	men	women
Doubles	men	women
- President's Cup

Alina Charaeva and Maria Timofeeva were the defending champions but chose not to participate.

Mariia Tkacheva and Anastasia Zolotareva won the title, defeating Momoko Kobori and Moyuka Uchijima in the final, 4–6, 6–1, [10–4].

== Seeds ==
1. (South Korea) Choi Ji-hee / (South Korea) Han Na-lae (semifinals)
2. (Israel) Shavit Kimchi / (India) Ankita Raina (quarterfinals)
3. (Japan) Momoko Kobori / (Japan) Moyuka Uchijima (final)
4. Ekaterina Kazionova / (Kazakhstan) Zhibek Kulambayeva (quarterfinals)

== Draw ==
Key

- Q = Qualifier
- WC = Wild card
- LL = Lucky loser
- Alt = Alternate
- ITF = ITF entry
- PR = Protected ranking
- SR = Special ranking
- SE = Special exempt
- JE = Junior exempt
- JR = Junior Accelerator Programme entrant
- CO = College Accelerator Programme entrant
- NG = Next Gen Accelerator Program entrant
- w/o = Walkover
- r = Retired
- d = Defaulted

=== Draw ===
First round
1	(South Korea) J-h Choi (South Korea) N-l Han	6	6
P Kudermetova; S Lansere	3	4
(South Korea) S-h Park (Hong Kong) C Wong H-y	6	6
(Uzbekistan) A Amanmuradova (Turkey) B Cengiz	0	2
3	(Japan) M Kobori (Japan) M Uchijima	6	6
WC	(Kazakhstan) S Chursina (Kazakhstan) S Kenzhibayeva	2	3
WC	(Kazakhstan) Z Rustemova (Kazakhstan) A Sagandikova	3	2
(Kazakhstan) G Ainitdinova; A Kubareva	6	6
E Maklakova; A Pospelova	6	6
(India) S Bavisetti; A Ureke	1	2
Y Karpovich; E Ovcharenko	3	3
4	E Kazionova (Kazakhstan) Z Kulambayeva	6	6
A Sukhotina (Turkey) İ Yörük	3	2
M Tkacheva; A Zolotareva	6	6
WC	(Kazakhstan) A Arystanbekova (Kazakhstan) A Nupbay	1	4
2	(Israel) S Kimchi (India) A Raina	6	6

Quarterfinals
1	(South Korea) J-h Choi (South Korea) N-l Han	1	6	[10]
(South Korea) S-h Park (Hong Kong) C Wong H-y	6	4	[7]
3	(Japan) M Kobori (Japan) M Uchijima	6	6
(Kazakhstan) G Ainitdinova; A Kubareva	4	3
E Maklakova; A Pospelova	6	6
4	E Kazionova (Kazakhstan) Z Kulambayeva	1	4
M Tkacheva; A Zolotareva	6	6
2	(Israel) S Kimchi (India) A Raina	4	2

Semifinals
1	(South Korea) J-h Choi (South Korea) N-l Han	6	4	[9]
3	(Japan) M Kobori (Japan) M Uchijima	1	6	[11]
E Maklakova; A Pospelova	1	1
M Tkacheva; A Zolotareva	6	6

Final
3	(Japan) M Kobori (Japan) M Uchijima	6	1	[4]
M Tkacheva; A Zolotareva	4	6	[10]
