= 2023 President's Cup (tennis) =

- Date: 24 July – 30 July
- Edition: 18th (men); 14th (women)
- Category: ATP Challenger Tour; ITF Women's World Tennis Tour
- Surface: Hard / Outdoor
- Location: Astana, Kazakhstan

Champions

Men's singles
- (Kazakhstan) Denis Yevseyev

Women's singles
- Polina Iatcenko

Men's doubles
- (India) S D Prajwal Dev / (India) Niki Kaliyanda Poonacha

Women's doubles
- Haruna Arakawa / (Japan) Erika Sema
← 2022 ·	President's Cup	· 2024 →

The 2023 President's Cup was a professional tennis tournament played on outdoor hard courts. It was the 18th edition of the men's tournament which was part of the 2023 ATP Challenger Tour, and the 14th edition of the women's tournament which was part of the 2023 ITF Women's World Tennis Tour. It took place in Astana, Kazakhstan between 24 July and 30 July 2023.

== Champions ==
=== Men's singles ===
- (Kazakhstan) Denis Yevseyev def. (Uzbekistan) Khumoyun Sultanov 7–5, 2–6, 6–4.

=== Men's doubles ===
- (India) S D Prajwal Dev / (India) Niki Kaliyanda Poonacha def. (Japan) Toshihide Matsui / (Japan) Kaito Uesugi 6–3, 7–6^{(7–4)}.

=== Women's singles ===
- Polina Iatcenko def. Aliona Falei, 6–3, 6–3

=== Women's doubles ===
- (Japan) Haruna Arakawa / (Japan) Erika Sema def. (India) Shrivalli Bhamidipaty / (India) Vaidehi Chaudhari, 6–7^{(6–8)}, 6–3, [10–5]

== Men's singles main draw entrants ==
=== Seeds ===
Country	Player	Rank^{1}	Seed
KAZ	Mikhail Kukushkin	223	1
ZIM	Benjamin Lock	314	2
KAZ	Denis Yevseyev	328	3
KAZ	Dmitry Popko	335	4
POL	Filip Peliwo	339	5
TUR	Yankı Erel	355	6
USA	Alafia Ayeni	399	7
GEO	Saba Purtseladze	433	8

- ^{1} Rankings are as of 17 July 2023.

=== Other entrants ===
The following players received wildcards into the singles main draw:

- (Turkey) Koray Kırcı
- (Kazakhstan) Timur Maulenov
- (Kazakhstan) Islam Orynbasar

The following player received entry into the singles main draw using a protected ranking:

- Evgenii Tiurnev

The following player received entry into the singles main draw as an alternate:

- (Georgia (country)) Zura Tkemaladze

The following players received entry from the qualifying draw:

- Egor Gerasimov
- (India) Niki Kaliyanda Poonacha
- Evgeny Philippov
- (India) Sidharth Rawat
- (India) Karan Singh
- Alexander Zgirovsky

== Women's singles main draw entrants ==
=== Seeds ===
Country	Player	Rank^{1}	Seed
	Anastasia Zakharova	233	1
	Ekaterina Maklakova	406	2
	Polina Iatcenko	424	3
	Aliona Falei	460	4
	Elena Pridankina	480	5
JPN	Haruna Arakawa	488	6
JPN	Erika Sema	497	7
IND	Vaidehi Chaudhari	502	8

- ^{1} Rankings are as of 24 July 2023.

=== Other entrants ===
The following players received wildcards into the singles main draw:

- (Kazakhstan) Asylzhan Arystanbekova
- (Kazakhstan) Dana Baidaulet
- (Kazakhstan) Zhanel Rustemova
- (Germany) Sonja Zhiyenbayeva

The following players received entry from the qualifying draw:

- (Kazakhstan) Yekaterina Dmitrichenko
- Aglaya Fedorova
- (Kazakhstan) Ariana Gogulina
- (Kazakhstan) Anastasiya Krymkova
- (Kazakhstan) Tatyana Nikolenko
- Zlata Saurasava
- Elizaveta Shebekina
- Daria Zelinskaya

The following player received entry as a lucky loser:

- (India) Prathyusha Rachapudi
