= 2026 Antalya Challenger 1 – Singles =

Singles
- 2026 Antalya Challenger 1

Final
- Champion: (Japan) Moyuka Uchijima
- Runner-up: (Ukraine) Anhelina Kalinina
- Score: 7–5, 7–5

Events
Singles	Doubles
- Antalya Challenger

Anca Todoni was the reigning champion, but did not participate this year due to surgery.

Moyuka Uchijima won the title, defeating Anhelina Kalinina 7–5, 7–5 in the final.

== Seeds ==
1. (Ukraine) Oleksandra Oliynykova (second round)
2. (Austria) Julia Grabher (first round, retired)
3. (Japan) Moyuka Uchijima (champion)
4. (Hungary) Panna Udvardy (second round)
5. (Egypt) Mayar Sherif (semifinals)
6. (Slovenia) Veronika Erjavec (semifinals)
7. (Netherlands) Arantxa Rus (first round)
8. (Italy) Lucia Bronzetti (first round)

== Draw ==
Key

- Q = Qualifier
- WC = Wild card
- LL = Lucky loser
- Alt = Alternate
- ITF = ITF entry
- PR = Protected ranking
- SR = Special ranking
- SE = Special exempt
- JE = Junior exempt
- JR = Junior Accelerator Programme entrant
- CO = College Accelerator Programme entrant
- NG = Next Gen Accelerator Program entrant
- w/o = Walkover
- r = Retired
- d = Defaulted

=== Finals ===
Semifinals
5	(Egypt) Mayar Sherif	6	5	5
3	(Japan) Moyuka Uchijima	4	7	7
6	(Slovenia) Veronika Erjavec	3	1
(Ukraine) Anhelina Kalinina	6	6

Final
3	(Japan) Moyuka Uchijima	7	7
(Ukraine) Anhelina Kalinina	5	5

=== Top half ===
First round
1	(Ukraine) O Oliynykova	1	6	6
(Uzbekistan) P Kudermetova	6	2	3
(France) A Ramé	6	1	2^{r}
LL	(Hungary) A Tóth	2	6	3
(Argentina) J Riera	7	6^{4}	3
Q	A Zolotareva	5	7^{7}	6
(Spain) G Maristany	1	6^{3}
5	(Egypt) M Sherif	6	7^{7}
3	(Japan) M Uchijima	6	6
(Poland) K Kawa	3	3
WC	(Turkey) İ Öz	3	4
A Gasanova	6	6
(Brazil) L Pigossi	6	1	3
LL	I Shymanovich	0	6	6
(Greece) D Papamichail	6	6
8	(Italy) L Bronzetti	3	1

Second round
1	(Ukraine) O Oliynykova	6	4	2
LL	(Hungary) A Tóth	1	6	6
Q	A Zolotareva	4	2
5	(Egypt) M Sherif	6	6
3	(Japan) M Uchijima	6	6
A Gasanova	3	2
LL	I Shymanovich	6	2	1
(Greece) D Papamichail	3	6	6

Quarterfinals
LL	(Hungary) A Tóth	6	4	4
5	(Egypt) M Sherif	4	6	6
3	(Japan) M Uchijima	6	6
(Greece) D Papamichail	2	3

Semifinals
5	(Egypt) M Sherif	6	5	5
3	(Japan) M Uchijima	4	7	7

=== Bottom half ===
First round
6	(Slovenia) V Erjavec	6	6
WC	(Turkey) İ Yörük	1	1
(Spain) L Romero Gormaz	6	3	6
Q	(Italy) D Spiteri	1	6	2
(Italy) N Brancaccio	6	6
WC	(Turkey) A Kumru	2	2
(France) C Monnet	2	1
4	(Hungary) P Udvardy	6	6
7	(Netherlands) A Rus	4	6^{3}
(France) S Janicijevic	6	7^{7}
WC	(Latvia) A Lachinova	3	2
(Georgia (country)) E Gorgodze	6	6
(Ukraine) A Kalinina	6	4	6
Q	A Ibragimova	4	6	1
Q	(Ukraine) K Zavatska	1
2	(Austria) J Grabher	2^{r}

Second round
6	(Slovenia) V Erjavec	6	6
(Spain) L Romero Gormaz	4	2
(Italy) N Brancaccio	6^{9}	6	7
4	(Hungary) P Udvardy	7^{11}	2	5
(France) S Janicijevic	3	3
(Georgia (country)) E Gorgodze	6	6
(Ukraine) A Kalinina	6	6
Q	(Ukraine) K Zavatska	1	2

Quarterfinals
6	(Slovenia) V Erjavec	7^{7}	0	6
(Italy) N Brancaccio	6^{4}	6	2
(Georgia (country)) E Gorgodze	4	1
(Ukraine) A Kalinina	6	6

Semifinals
6	(Slovenia) V Erjavec	3	1
(Ukraine) A Kalinina	6	6

== Qualifying ==
=== Seeds ===
1. Iryna Shymanovich (qualifying competition, lucky loser)
2. (Brazil) Carolina Alves (first round)
3. (Hungary) Amarissa Tóth (qualifying competition, lucky loser)
4. (Serbia) Mia Ristić (qualifying competition)
5. (Italy) Dalila Spiteri (qualified)
6. Anastasia Zolotareva (qualified)
7. (Ukraine) Katarina Zavatska (qualified)
8. (Slovenia) Polona Hercog (first round)

=== Qualifiers ===
1. (Ukraine) Katarina Zavatska
2. Anastasia Zolotareva
3. (Italy) Dalila Spiteri
4. Alevtina Ibragimova

=== Lucky losers ===
1. Iryna Shymanovich
2. (Hungary) Amarissa Tóth

=== Qualifying draw ===
==== First qualifier ====
First round
1	Iryna Shymanovich	6	6
(Bulgaria) Denislava Glushkova	1	4
WC	(Turkey) Defne Çırpanlı	1	1
7	(Ukraine) Katarina Zavatska	6	6

Qualifying competition
1	Iryna Shymanovich	4	2
7	(Ukraine) Katarina Zavatska	6	6

==== Second qualifier ====
First round
2	(Brazil) Carolina Alves	4	6^{6}
(Italy) Martina Colmegna	6	7^{8}
WC	(Turkey) Deniz Çakıl	2	4
6	Anastasia Zolotareva	6	6

Qualifying competition
(Italy) Martina Colmegna	3	5
6	Anastasia Zolotareva	6	7

==== Third qualifier ====
First round
3	(Hungary) Amarissa Tóth	6	1	6
(Georgia (country)) Sofia Shapatava	2	6	4
(Japan) Ikumi Yamazaki	1	4
5	(Italy) Dalila Spiteri	6	6

Qualifying competition
3	(Hungary) Amarissa Tóth	3	3
5	(Italy) Dalila Spiteri	6	6

==== Fourth qualifier ====
First round
4	(Serbia) Mia Ristić	6	6
Darya Astakhova	3	2
Alevtina Ibragimova	6	1	7
8	(Slovenia) Polona Hercog	1	6	5

Qualifying competition
4	(Serbia) Mia Ristić	1	0
Alevtina Ibragimova	6	6
