= 2022 President's Cup (tennis) =

Tennis tournament

- Date: 18–24 July 2022
- Edition: 17th (men); 13th (women)
- Category: ATP Challenger Tour; ITF Women's World Tennis Tour
- Prize money: $53,120 (men) $60,000 (women)
- Surface: Hard / Outdoor
- Location: Nur-Sultan, Kazakhstan

Champions

Men's singles
- Roman Safiullin

Women's singles
- (Japan) Moyuka Uchijima

Men's doubles
- (South Korea) Nam Ji-sung / (South Korea) Song Min-kyu

Women's doubles
- Mariia Tkacheva / Anastasia Zolotareva
- President's Cup

The 2022 President's Cup was a professional tennis tournament played on outdoor hard courts. It was the seventeenth edition of the men's tournament which was part of the 2022 ATP Challenger Tour, and the thirteenth edition of the women's tournament which was part of the 2022 ITF Women's World Tennis Tour. It took place in Nur-Sultan, Kazakhstan between 18 and 24 July 2022.

== Champions ==
=== Men's singles ===
- Roman Safiullin def. (Kazakhstan) Denis Yevseyev 2–6, 6–4, 7–6^{(7–2)}.

=== Men's doubles ===
- (South Korea) Nam Ji-sung / (South Korea) Song Min-kyu def. (Czech Republic) Andrew Paulson / (Czech Republic) David Poljak 6–2, 3–6, [10–6].

=== Women's singles ===
- (Japan) Moyuka Uchijima def. (Serbia) Natalija Stevanović, 6–3, 7–6^{(7–2)}

=== Women's doubles ===
- Mariia Tkacheva / Anastasia Zolotareva def. (Japan) Momoko Kobori / (Japan) Moyuka Uchijima, 4–6, 6–1, [10–4]

== Men's singles main draw entrants ==
=== Seeds ===
Country	Player	Rank^{1}	Seed
	Roman Safiullin	148	1
GBR	Jay Clarke	160	2
KAZ	Dmitry Popko	186	3
KAZ	Mikhail Kukushkin	221	4
KAZ	Timofey Skatov	227	5
	Evgeny Karlovskiy	239	6
	Evgeny Donskoy	243	7
UKR	Illya Marchenko	282	8

- ^{1} Rankings are as of 11 July 2022.

=== Other entrants ===
The following players received wildcards into the singles main draw:

- (Kazakhstan) Grigoriy Lomakin
- (Kazakhstan) Dostanbek Tashbulatov
- (Kazakhstan) Beibit Zhukayev

The following player received entry into the singles main draw using a protected ranking:

- (New Zealand) Rubin Statham

The following players received entry from the qualifying draw:

- (United States) Alafia Ayeni
- (Turkey) Yankı Erel
- (South Korea) Hong Seong-chan
- Ivan Liutarevich
- (South Korea) Nam Ji-sung
- (Czech Republic) Dominik Palán

== Women's singles main draw entrants ==
=== Seeds ===
Country	Player	Rank^{1}	Seed
	Vitalia Diatchenko	117	1
JPN	Moyuka Uchijima	163	2
GEO	Mariam Bolkvadze	174	3
KOR	Han Na-lae	240	4
SRB	Natalija Stevanović	248	5
	Valeria Savinykh	272	6
KOR	Park So-hyun	308	7
	Ekaterina Kazionova	323	8

- ^{1} Rankings are as of 11 July 2022.

=== Other entrants ===
The following players received wildcards into the singles main draw:

- (Kazakhstan) Gozal Ainitdinova
- (Kazakhstan) Erkezhan Arystanbekova
- (Kazakhstan) Sandugash Kenzhibayeva
- (Kazakhstan) Aruzhan Sagandikova

The following players received entry from the qualifying draw:

- Tatiana Barkova
- (Japan) Momoko Kobori
- Daria Kudashova
- Sofya Lansere
- Ekaterina Maklakova
- Kira Pavlova
- Dana Shakirova
- (Hong Kong) Cody Wong Hong-yi
