= Khumoyun Sultanov =

Uzbekistani tennis player (born 1998)

- Country (sports): Uzbekistan
- Residence: Namangan, Uzbekistan
- Born: 27 October 1998 (age 27) Namangan, Uzbekistan
- Height: 1.80 m (5 ft 11 in)
- Plays: Right-handed (two-handed backhand)
- Coach: Onarkhon Savaeva
- Prize money: $ 286,319

Singles
- Career record: 7–7 (at ATP Tour level, Grand Slam level, and in Davis Cup)
- Career titles: 0
- Highest ranking: No. 215 (6 January 2025)
- Current ranking: No. 439 (28 September 2026)

Grand Slam singles results
- Australian Open: Q2 (2025)
- French Open: Q1 (2025)

Doubles
- Career record: 1–2 (at ATP Tour level, Grand Slam level, and in Davis Cup)
- Career titles: 0
- Highest ranking: No. 363 (2 May 2022)
- Current ranking: No. 1,681 (03 August 2026)

Team competitions
- Davis Cup: 2–6
Medal record
Men's tennis
Representing Uzbekistan
Asian Games
Bronze medal – third place	2022 Hangzhou	Singles
Bronze medal – third place	2026 Aichi–Nagoya	Singles
Universiade
Gold medal – first place	2019 Naples	Doubles
Gold medal – first place	2019 Naples	Team
Silver medal – second place	2019 Naples	Singles
- Last updated on: 04 August 2026.

Khumoyun Agzamdzhanovich Sultanov (born 27 October 1998) is an Uzbek tennis player. He has a career high ATP singles ranking of world No. 215 achieved on 6 January 2025. He also has a career high doubles ranking of No. 363 achieved on 2 May 2022. Sultanov is currently the No. 2 Uzbek player.

Sultanov represents Uzbekistan at the Davis Cup, where he has a W/L record of 4–6.

== ATP Challenger and ITF Tour finals ==
=== Singles: 23 (11 titles, 12 runner-ups) ===
Legend ATP Challenger Tour (0–1) ITF Futures/WTT (11–11)	Finals by surface Hard (9–7) Clay (2–5)

Result	W–L	Date	Tournament	Tier	Surface	Opponent	Score
Loss	0–1	Sep 2016	Kazakhstan F5, Shymkent	Futures	Clay	(Estonia) Vladimir Ivanov	5–7, 6–4, 6–7^{(7–9)}
Win	1–1	Oct 2019	M15 Qarshi, Uzbekistan	WTT	Hard	(Kazakhstan) Beibit Zhukayev	6–2, 6–1
Loss	1–2	Feb 2020	M25 Nonthaburi, Thailand	WTT	Hard	(Croatia) Matija Pecotić	1–6, 6–3, 2–6
Win	2–2	Nov 2021	M25 Prague, Czech Republic	WTT	Hard	(Czech Republic) David Poljak	6–2, 3–6, 6–4
Win	3–2	May 2022	M25 Jablonec nad Nisou, Czech Republic	WTT	Clay	(United States) Martin Damm	6–7^{(10−12)}, 7–6^{(7−5)}, 6–3
Loss	3–3	Jan 2023	M25 Al Zahra, Kuwait	WTT	Hard (i)	(India) Prajnesh Gunneswaran	2–6, 6–7^{(5−7)}
Loss	3–4	Apr 2023	M25 Saint-Dizier, France	WTT	Hard (i)	(France) Clément Chidekh	6–7^{(4−7)}, 1–6
Loss	3–5	Jul 2023	Astana, Kazakhstan	Challenger	Hard	(Kazakhstan) Denis Yevseyev	5–7, 6-2, 4–6
Win	4–5	Nov 2023	M25 Vale do Lobo, Portugal	WTT	Hard	(France) Jules Marie	6–4, 7–6^{(13−11)}
Win	5–5	Jan 2024	M15 Doha, Qatar	WTT	Hard	(Turkey) Yanki Erel	7–6^{(7−3)}, 6–4
Loss	5–6	Jan 2024	M15 Doha, Qatar	WTT	Hard	(Turkey) Ergi Kırkın	6–3, 1–6, 5–7
Loss	5–7	Feb 2024	M25 Vila Real de Santo António, Portugal	WTT	Hard	(Spain) Martín Landaluce	0–6, 3–6
Win	6–7	Mar 2024	M15 Chandigarh, India	WTT	Hard	(India) Ramkumar Ramanathan	6–4, 6–2
Loss	6–8	Jun 2024	M25 Duffel, Belgium	WTT	Clay	(Austria) Sandro Kopp	4–6, 3–6
Loss	6–9	Jun 2024	M25 Brussels, Belgium	WTT	Clay	(Netherlands) Max Houkes	7–5, 1–6, 1–6
Loss	6–10	Jul 2024	M25 Kassel, Germany	WTT	Clay	(Belgium) Raphael Collignon	1–6, 4–6
Win	7–10	Jul 2024	M25 Astana, Kazakhstan	WTT	Hard	(United States) Alafia Ayeni	6–2, 6–4
Win	8–10	Aug 2024	M25 Idanha-a-Nova, Portugal	WTT	Hard	(Lithuania) Edas Butvilas	6–4, 7–5
Loss	8–11	Nov 2024	M25 Mumbai, India	WTT	Hard	(Czech Republic) Dalibor Svrčina	6–3, 1–6, 2–6
Win	9–11	Nov 2024	M25 Kalaburagi, India	WTT	Hard	Bogdan Bobrov	6–2, 6–1
Win	10–11	Jan 2026	M15 Zahra, Kuwait	WTT	Hard	(Switzerland) Luca Stäheli	6–4, 6–2
Loss	10–12	May 2026	M15 Klagenfurt, Austria	WTT	Clay	(Italy) Samuele Pieri	1–6, 2–6
Win	11–12	May 2026	M15 Kranjska Gora, Slovenia	WTT	Clay	(Spain) Tito Chávez	6–0, 7–5

=== Doubles 15 (8 titles, 7 runner-ups) ===
Legend ATP Challenger Tour (0–0) ITF Futures/WTT (8–7)

Result	W–L	Date	Tournament	Tier	Surface	Partner	Opponents	Score
Win	1–0	Oct 2016	Kazakhstan F6, Shymkent	Futures	Clay	(Kazakhstan) Timur Khabibulin	(Russia) Mikhail Fufygin (Estonia) Vladimir Ivanov	7–6^{(7–2)}, 6–3
Loss	1–1	Dec 2017	Turkey F45, Antalya	Futures	Clay	(Turkey) Gökberk Ergeneman	(Serbia) Nikola Čačić (Switzerland) Luca Margaroli	5–7, 2–6
Win	2–1	Jun 2018	Uzbekistan F4, Namangan	Futures	Hard	(Uzbekistan) Sanjar Fayziev	(Russia) Konstantin Kravchuk (Russia) Roman Safiullin	7–6^{(8–6)}, 5–7, [10–8]
Loss	2–2	Jan 2019	M25 Kazan, Russia	WTT	Hard (i)	(Russia) Alexander Vasilenko	(Russia) Mikhail Fufygin (Russia) Denis Matsukevich	4–6, 4–6
Loss	2–3	May 2019	M25 Namangan, Uzbekistan	WTT	Hard	(Uzbekistan) Sanjar Fayziev	(Russia) Roman Safiullin (Russia) Evgenii Tiurnev	6–7^{(5–7)}, 3–6
Win	3–3	Jun 2019	M25 Nonthaburi, Thailand	WTT	Hard	(Russia) Anton Chekhov	(Thailand) Sanchai Ratiwatana (Thailand) Sonchat Ratiwatana	5–7, 6–2, [10–2]
Loss	3–4	Oct 2019	M15 Qarshi, Uzbekistan	WTT	Hard	(Russia) Anton Chekhov	(Uzbekistan) Sanjar Fayziev (Kazakhstan) Timur Khabibulin	6–7^{(2–7)}, 4–6
Win	4–4	Nov 2020	M15 Antalya, Turkey	WTT	Clay	(Russia) Timur Kiyamov	(Italy) Luciano Darderi (Ukraine) Georgii Kravchenko	6–2, 7–6^{(7–5)}
Win	5–4	Dec 2020	M15 Antalya, Turkey	WTT	Clay	(Russia) Timur Kiyamov	(Turkey) Umut Akkoyun (Turkey) Mert Naci Türker	6–4, 6–3
Win	6–4	Sep 2021	M25 Jönköping, Sweden	WTT	Hard	(Japan) Yuta Shimizu	(Poland) Michal Dembek (Germany) Marvin Möller	6–4, 4–6, [10−6]
Win	7–4	Oct 2021	M25 Falun, Sweden	WTT	Hard	(Japan) Yuta Shimizu	(Australia) Blake Ellis (Japan) Renta Tokuda	6–3, 3–6, [11−9]
Loss	7–5	Feb 2022	M25 Antalya, Turkey	WTT	Clay	(Turkey) Tuna Altuna	(Romania) Alexandru Jecan (Romania) Stefan Palosi	1–6, 3–6
Loss	7–6	Nov 2022	M15 Heraklion, Greece	WTT	Hard	(Croatia) Domagoj Bilješko	(Poland) Szymon Kielan (Ukraine) Volodymyr Uzhylovskyi	6–7^{(6–8)}, 5–7
Win	8–6	Jan 2023	M15 Doha, Qatar	WTT	Hard	(India) Parikshit Somani	(Italy) Jacopo Berrettini (Estonia) Kristjan Tamm	7–6^{(7–3)}, 6–2
Loss	8–7	Aug 2024	M25 Idanha-a-Nova, Portugal	WTT	Hard	(Germany) Lucas Deliano	(Portugal) Diogo Marques (Portugal) Tiago Pereira	4–6, 5–7

== Davis Cup ==
=== Participations: (1–1) ===
Group membership World Group (0–0) WG Play-off (0–0) Group I (1–1) Group II (0–0) Group III (0–0) Group IV (0–0)	Matches by surface Hard (0–0) Clay (0–1) Grass (1–0) Carpet (0–0)	Matches by type Singles (1–1) Doubles (0–0)

- ▲ ▼ indicates the outcome of the Davis Cup match followed by the score, date, place of event, the zonal classification and its phase, and the court surface.

Rubber outcome	No.	Rubber	Match type (partner if any)	Opponent nation	Opponent player(s)	Score
▲4–1; 6–7 April 2018; Naval Sports Complex, Islamabad, Pakistan; Asia/Oceania Zone Group I Second round; Grass surface
Victory	1	V	Singles (dead rubber)	Pakistan	Muzammil Murtaza	6–3, 6–1
▲3–2; 13–14 September 2019; Automobile and Touring Club of Lebanon, Jounieh, Lebanon; Asia/Oceania Zone Group I First round; Grass surface
Defeat	2	II	Singles	Lebanon	Benjamin Hassan	6–2, 3–6, 5–7

== Universiade ==
=== Singles: 1 (1 runner-up) ===
Result	No.	Date	Tournament	Surface	Opponent	Score
Loss	1.	13 July 2019	Naples, Italy	Clay	(Chinese Taipei) Tseng Chun-hsin	7–6^{(7–4)}, 3–6, 1–6

=== Doubles: 1 (1 title) ===
Result	No.	Date	Tournament	Surface	Partner	Opponents	Score
Win	1.	12 July 2019	Naples, Italy	Clay	(Uzbekistan) Sanjar Fayziev	(South Korea) Hong Seong-chan (South Korea) Shin San-hui	7–5, 4–6, [10–5]
