= 2022 President's Cup – Men's doubles =

Men's doubles
- 2022 President's Cup

Final
- Champions: (South Korea) Nam Ji-sung (South Korea) Song Min-kyu
- Runners-up: (Czech Republic) Andrew Paulson (Czech Republic) David Poljak
- Score: 6–2, 3–6, [10–6]

Events
Singles	men	women
Doubles	men	women
- President's Cup

Hsu Yu-hsiou and Benjamin Lock were the defending champions but only Lock chose to defend his title, partnering Grigoriy Lomakin. Lock lost in the semifinals to Andrew Paulson and David Poljak.

Nam Ji-sung and Song Min-kyu won the title after defeating Paulson and Poljak 6–2, 3–6, [10–6] in the final.

== Seeds ==
1. (Zimbabwe) Benjamin Lock / (Kazakhstan) Grigoriy Lomakin (semifinals)
2. (South Korea) Nam Ji-sung / (South Korea) Song Min-kyu (champions)
3. (Czech Republic) Andrew Paulson / (Czech Republic) David Poljak (final)
4. Yan Bondarevskiy / (Kazakhstan) Beibit Zhukayev (quarterfinals)

== Draw ==
Key

- Q = Qualifier
- WC = Wild card
- LL = Lucky loser
- Alt = Alternate
- ITF = ITF entry
- PR = Protected ranking
- SR = Special ranking
- SE = Special exempt
- JE = Junior exempt
- JR = Junior Accelerator Programme entrant
- CO = College Accelerator Programme entrant
- NG = Next Gen Accelerator Program entrant
- w/o = Walkover
- r = Retired
- d = Defaulted

First round
WC	(Kazakhstan) Arslanbek Aitkulov (Kazakhstan) Max Batyutenko	2	3
I Liutarevich (Kazakhstan) D Yevseyev	6	6
3	(Czech Republic) A Paulson (Czech Republic) D Poljak	7^{7}	7
(Georgia (country)) S Purtseladze (Georgia (country)) Z Tkemaladze	6^{5}	5
(United States) A Ayeni (Turkey) Y Erel	6^{3}	4
Alt	E Arutiunian; Aliaksandr Liaonenka	7^{7}	6
(Uzbekistan) D Istomin; E Karlovskiy	3	6	[8]
E Donskoy; A Kachmazov	6	4	[10]
(Estonia) D Glinka (Estonia) Karl Kiur Saar	3	4
4	Yan Bondarevskiy (Kazakhstan) B Zhukayev	6	6
WC	(Uzbekistan) Maxim Shin (Kazakhstan) Dostanbek Tashbulatov	0	5
(Israel) D Cukierman (Kazakhstan) D Popko	6	7
(Australia) A Santillan (New Zealand) R Statham	5	7^{7}	[4]
2	(South Korea) J-s Nam (South Korea) M-k Song	7	6^{5}	[10]

Quarterfinals
1	(Zimbabwe) B Lock (Kazakhstan) G Lomakin	6	6
I Liutarevich (Kazakhstan) D Yevseyev	4	4
3	(Czech Republic) A Paulson (Czech Republic) D Poljak	6	3	[10]
Alt	E Arutiunian; A Liaonenka	1	6	[8]
E Donskoy; A Kachmazov	5	6	[10]
4	Y Bondarevskiy (Kazakhstan) B Zhukayev	7	3	[7]
(Israel) D Cukierman (Kazakhstan) D Popko	6	3	[7]
2	(South Korea) J-s Nam (South Korea) M-k Song	3	6	[10]

Semifinals
1	(Zimbabwe) B Lock (Kazakhstan) G Lomakin	6	4	[11]
3	(Czech Republic) A Paulson (Czech Republic) D Poljak	4	6	[13]
E Donskoy; A Kachmazov	1	5
2	(South Korea) J-s Nam (South Korea) M-k Song	6	7

Final
3	(Czech Republic) A Paulson (Czech Republic) D Poljak	2	6	[6]
2	(South Korea) J-s Nam (South Korea) M-k Song	6	3	[10]
