= 2022 President's Cup – Men's singles =

Men's singles
- 2022 President's Cup

Final
- Champion: Roman Safiullin
- Runner-up: (Kazakhstan) Denis Yevseyev
- Score: 2–6, 6–4, 7–6^{(7–2)}

Events
Singles	men	women
Doubles	men	women
- President's Cup

Andrey Kuznetsov was the defending champion but chose not to defend his title.

Roman Safiullin won the title after defeating Denis Yevseyev 2–6, 6–4, 7–6^{(7–2)} in the final.

== Seeds ==
1. Roman Safiullin (champion)
2. (United Kingdom) Jay Clarke (first round, retired)
3. (Kazakhstan) Dmitry Popko (semifinals)
4. (Kazakhstan) Mikhail Kukushkin (second round)
5. (Kazakhstan) Timofey Skatov (first round)
6. Evgeny Karlovskiy (second round)
7. Evgeny Donskoy (quarterfinals)
8. (Ukraine) Illya Marchenko (first round)

== Draw ==
Key

- Q = Qualifier
- WC = Wild card
- LL = Lucky loser
- Alt = Alternate
- ITF = ITF entry
- PR = Protected ranking
- SR = Special ranking
- SE = Special exempt
- JE = Junior exempt
- JR = Junior Accelerator Programme entrant
- CO = College Accelerator Programme entrant
- NG = Next Gen Accelerator Program entrant
- w/o = Walkover
- r = Retired
- d = Defaulted

=== Finals ===
Semifinals
1	Roman Safiullin	6	6
3	(Kazakhstan) Dmitry Popko	3	2
(Kazakhstan) Denis Yevseyev	6	6
WC	(Kazakhstan) Beibit Zhukayev	4	4

Final
1	Roman Safiullin	2	6	7^{7}
(Kazakhstan) Denis Yevseyev	6	4	6^{2}

=== Top half ===
First round
1	R Safiullin	6	3	6
Q	(South Korea) S-c Hong	2	6	3
Q	(United States) A Ayeni	6	6
WC	(Kazakhstan) Dostanbek Tashbulatov	1	0
(Zimbabwe) B Lock	6	6
(Uzbekistan) S Fomin	4	1
Q	(South Korea) J-s Nam	7^{7}	4	7
5	(Kazakhstan) T Skatov	6^{4}	6	5
3	(Kazakhstan) D Popko	6	6
PR	(New Zealand) R Statham	3	4
(India) P Gunneswaran	3	3
Q	(Turkey) Y Erel	6	6
(Czech Republic) D Poljak	3	7^{9}	6
(Australia) A Santillan	6	6^{7}	4
Q	(Czech Republic) D Palán	2	6^{3}
7	E Donskoy	6	7^{7}

Second round
1	R Safiullin	6	6
Q	(United States) A Ayeni	2	4
(Zimbabwe) B Lock	6	6
Q	(South Korea) J-s Nam	2	1
3	(Kazakhstan) D Popko	7^{8}	6
Q	(Turkey) Y Erel	6^{6}	4
(Czech Republic) D Poljak	4	6	3
7	E Donskoy	6	3	6

Quarterfinals
1	R Safiullin	6	6
(Zimbabwe) B Lock	2	3
3	(Kazakhstan) D Popko	7	6
7	E Donskoy	5	4

Semifinals
1	R Safiullin	6	6
3	(Kazakhstan) D Popko	3	2

=== Bottom half ===
First round
6	E Karlovskiy	6	6
(Czech Republic) A Paulson	4	4
(Kazakhstan) D Yevseyev	6	3	6
A Kachmazov	3	6	4
Q	I Liutarevich	6	3	4
(Brazil) G Décamps	2	6	6
(Monaco) L Catarina	1	1
4	(Kazakhstan) M Kukushkin	6	6
8	(Ukraine) I Marchenko	6	6
WC	(Kazakhstan) G Lomakin	3	3
Yan Bondarevskiy	3	6	2
(Uzbekistan) D Istomin	6	3	6
(Japan) Shintaro Imai	6^{3}	1
WC	(Kazakhstan) B Zhukayev	7^{7}	6
(Israel) D Cukierman	6	5
2	(United Kingdom) J Clarke	1	3^{r}

Second round
6	E Karlovskiy	6	2	4
(Kazakhstan) D Yevseyev	3	6	6
(Brazil) G Décamps	6	6^{2}	6
4	(Kazakhstan) M Kukushkin	3	7^{7}	3
8	(Ukraine) I Marchenko	4	6^{9}
(Uzbekistan) D Istomin	6	7^{11}
WC	(Kazakhstan) B Zhukayev	6	5	7^{7}
(Israel) D Cukierman	4	7	6^{4}

Quarterfinals
(Kazakhstan) D Yevseyev	6	2	6
(Brazil) G Décamps	4	6	4
(Uzbekistan) D Istomin	7^{7}	6^{10}	6^{5}
WC	(Kazakhstan) B Zhukayev	6^{5}	7^{12}	7^{7}

Semifinals
(Kazakhstan) D Yevseyev	6	6
WC	(Kazakhstan) B Zhukayev	4	4
