= Mariia Tkacheva =

Russian tennis player (born 2001)

- Full name: Mariia Sergeyevna Tkacheva
- Native name: Мария Сергеевна Ткачёва
- Country (sports): Russia
- Born: 17 December 2001 (age 24)
- Plays: Right (two-handed backhand)
- Prize money: $97,821

Singles
- Career record: 166–87
- Career titles: 7 ITF
- Highest ranking: No. 266 (31 March 2025)
- Current ranking: No. 732 (10 August 2026)

Doubles
- Career record: 107–48
- Career titles: 14 ITF
- Highest ranking: No. 305 (26 May 2025)
- Last updated on: 19 August 2026.

Mariia Sergeyevna Tkacheva (Russian: Мария Сергеевна Ткачёва; born 17 December 2001) is a Russian tennis player. She has career-high rankings of world No. 266 singles and No. 305 in doubles, by the WTA, achieved in March and May 2025, respectively.

Tkacheva has won seven singles and 14 doubles tournaments on the ITF Women's World Tennis Tour.

== Career ==
Tkacheva won her biggest title to date at the 2022 President's Cup, where she partnered Anastasia Zolotareva to win in doubles.

She made her WTA Tour debut at the 2022 Chennai Open, losing to Varvara Gracheva in the first round.

== ITF Circuit finals ==
=== Singles: 14 (7 titles, 7 runner-ups) ===
Legend W40/50 tournaments W25/35 tournaments W15 tournaments	Finals by surface Hard (7–7)

Result	W–L	Date	Tournament	Tier	Surface	Opponent	Score
Win	1–0	Oct 2019	ITF Antalya, Turkey	15,000	Hard	(Germany) Romy Kölzer	6–2, 4–6, 6–1
Loss	1–1	Nov 2019	ITF Antalya, Turkey	15,000	Hard	(Russia) Daria Kruzhkova	5–7, 7–5, 6–7^{(1)}
Loss	1–2	Dec 2019	ITF Monastir, Tunisia	15,000	Hard	(France) Carole Monnet	5–7, 2–6
Loss	1–3	Mar 2022	Nur-Sultan Challenger, Kazakhstan	W25	Hard (i)	Anastasia Zakharova	3–6, 1–6
Win	2–3	Mar 2022	ITF Sharm El Sheikh, Egypt	W15	Hard	(Hong Kong) Cody Wong	3–6, 6–3, 6–3
Win	3–3	Mar 2022	ITF Sharm El Sheikh, Egypt	W15	Hard	(China) Liu Fangzhou	6–4, 6–2
Win	4–3	Jul 2022	ITF Nur-Sultan, Kazakhstan	W25	Hard	(Japan) Moyuka Uchijima	7–6^{(2)}, 6–2
Win	5–3	Nov 2023	ITF Sharm El Sheikh, Egypt	W15	Hard	(Switzerland) Jenny Dürst	6–1, 6–2
Loss	5–4	Dec 2023	ITF Sharm El Sheikh, Egypt	W15	Hard	Kira Pavlova	1–6, 6–7^{(3)}
Loss	5–5	Apr 2024	ITF Monastir, Tunisia	W15	Hard	(Lithuania) Patricija Paukštytė	6–7^{(4)}, 2–6
Win	6–5	May 2024	ITF Monastir, Tunisia	W15	Hard	(South Korea) Back Da-yeon	6–4, 6–3
Loss	6–6	Aug 2024	ITF Nakhon Si Thammarat, Thailand	W35	Hard	(Japan) Hikaru Sato	6–4, 3–6, 2–6
Loss	6–7	Nov 2024	ITF Veracruz, Mexico	W50	Hard	(Croatia) Antonia Ružić	4–6, 6–7^{(3)}
Win	7–7	Nov 2024	ITF Chihuahua, Mexico	W50	Hard	Daria Kudashova	6–1, 6–3

=== Doubles: 21 (15 titles, 6 runner-ups) ===
Legend W60 tournaments W50 tournaments W25 tournaments W15 tournaments	Finals by surface Hard (11–4) Clay (4–2)

Result	W–L	Date	Tournament	Tier	Surface	Partner	Opponents	Score
Win	1–0	Sep 2019	ITF Shymkent, Kazakhstan	15,000	Clay	(Russia) Veronika Pepelyaeva	(Russia) Elina Avanesyan (Belarus) Viktoryia Kanapatskaya	6–4, 6–4
Win	2–0	Nov 2019	ITF Antalya, Turkey	15,000	Hard	(Russia) Victoria Mikhaylova	(Ukraine) Anastasiya Poplavska (Belarus) Nika Shytkouskaya	6–3, 7–5
Win	3–0	Dec 2019	ITF Monastir, Tunisia	15,000	Hard	(Serbia) Tamara Čurović	(Poland) Anna Hertel (Switzerland) Marie Mettraux	6–3, 0–6, [10–8]
Loss	3–1	Dec 2019	ITF Monastir, Tunisia	15,000	Hard	(France) Carole Monnet	(France) Yasmine Mansouri (Switzerland) Marie Mettraux	4–6, 6–3, [6–10]
Win	4–1	Jan 2022	ITF Cairo, Egypt	W15	Clay	Anastasia Zolotareva	(Ukraine) Mariia Bergen (Bulgaria) Ani Vangelova	6–3, 1–6, [10–8]
Win	5–1	Jan 2022	ITF Cairo, Egypt	W15	Clay	Anastasia Zolotareva	(Greece) Sapfo Sakellaridi (China) Youmi Zhuoma	6–1, 6–4
Loss	5–2	Jan 2022	ITF Cairo, Egypt	W15	Clay	Anastasia Zolotareva	(Romania) Oana Georgeta Simion; Anna Ureke	3–6, 6–7^{(4)}
Win	6–2	Apr 2022	ITF Cairo, Egypt	W15	Clay	(Italy) Diletta Cherubini	(France) Émeline Dartron (France) Lucie Nguyen Tan	3–6, 6–3, [10–8]
Loss	6–3	May 2022	ITF Cairo, Egypt	W25	Clay	(Sweden) Caijsa Hennemann	(France) Océane Babel (Poland) Weronika Falkowska	4–6, 1–6
Win	7–3	Jul 2022	President's Cup, Kazakhstan	W60	Hard	Anastasia Zolotareva	(Japan) Momoko Kobori (Japan) Moyuka Uchijima	4–6, 6–1, [10–4]
Win	8–3	Aug 2023	ITF Monastir, Tunisia	W15	Hard	Ekaterina Shalimova	(Switzerland) Paula Cembranos (Switzerland) Jenny Dürst	6–2, 3–6, [10–6]
Loss	8–4	Dec 2023	ITF Sharm El Sheikh, Egypt	W15	Hard	Daria Zelinskaya	(Romania) Karola Bejenaru (Slovakia) Katarína Kužmová	3–6, 6–7^{(5)}
Win	9–4	Dec 2023	ITF Sharm El Sheikh, Egypt	W25	Hard	Victoria Mikhaylova	(Poland) Maja Chwalińska (Poland) Gina Feistel	6–4, 3–6, [13–11]
Win	10–4	Apr 2024	ITF Monastir, Tunisia	W15	Hard	(South Korea) Jang Gaeul	(Germany) Tessa Brockmann (Belgium) Ema Kovacevic	7–5, 6–3
Win	11–4	Apr 2024	ITF Monastir, Tunisia	W15	Hard	Milana Zhabrailova	(Belgium) Eliessa Vanlangendonck (Germany) Emily Welker	6–3, 6–1
Win	12–4	Jun 2024	ITF Monastir, Tunisia	W15	Hard	(Slovakia) Katarína Kužmová	(Lithuania) Patricija Paukštytė (Egypt) Merna Refaat	6–1, 6–1
Loss	12–5	Mar 2025	ITF Gurugram, India	W35	Hard	Polina Iatcenko	Ekaterina Makarova; Ekaterina Reyngold	6–2, 4–6, [7–10]
Win	13–5	Mar 2025	ITF Santo Domingo, Dominican Republic	W50	Hard	Anastasia Tikhonova	(United States) Ayana Akli (United States) Clervie Ngounoue	7–6^{(5)}, 6–7^{(2)}, [10–7]
Win	14–5	Apr 2025	ITF Sharm El Sheikh, Egypt	W35	Hard	(Slovakia) Katarína Kužmová	Aliona Falei; Polina Iatcenko	6–4, 6–3
Loss	14–6	Aug 2026	ITF Astana, Kazakhstan	W15	Hard	Daria Zelinskaya	(South Korea) Kim Eun-chae (South Korea) Lee Ha-eum	1–6, 4–6
Win	15–6	Sep 2026	ITF Hurghada, Egypt	W35	Hard	Elina Nepliy	(Colombia) María Herazo González (Italy) Federica Sacco	6–3, 6–2
