= Moyuka Uchijima =

Japanese tennis player (born 2001)

Moyuka Uchijima 内島 萌夏
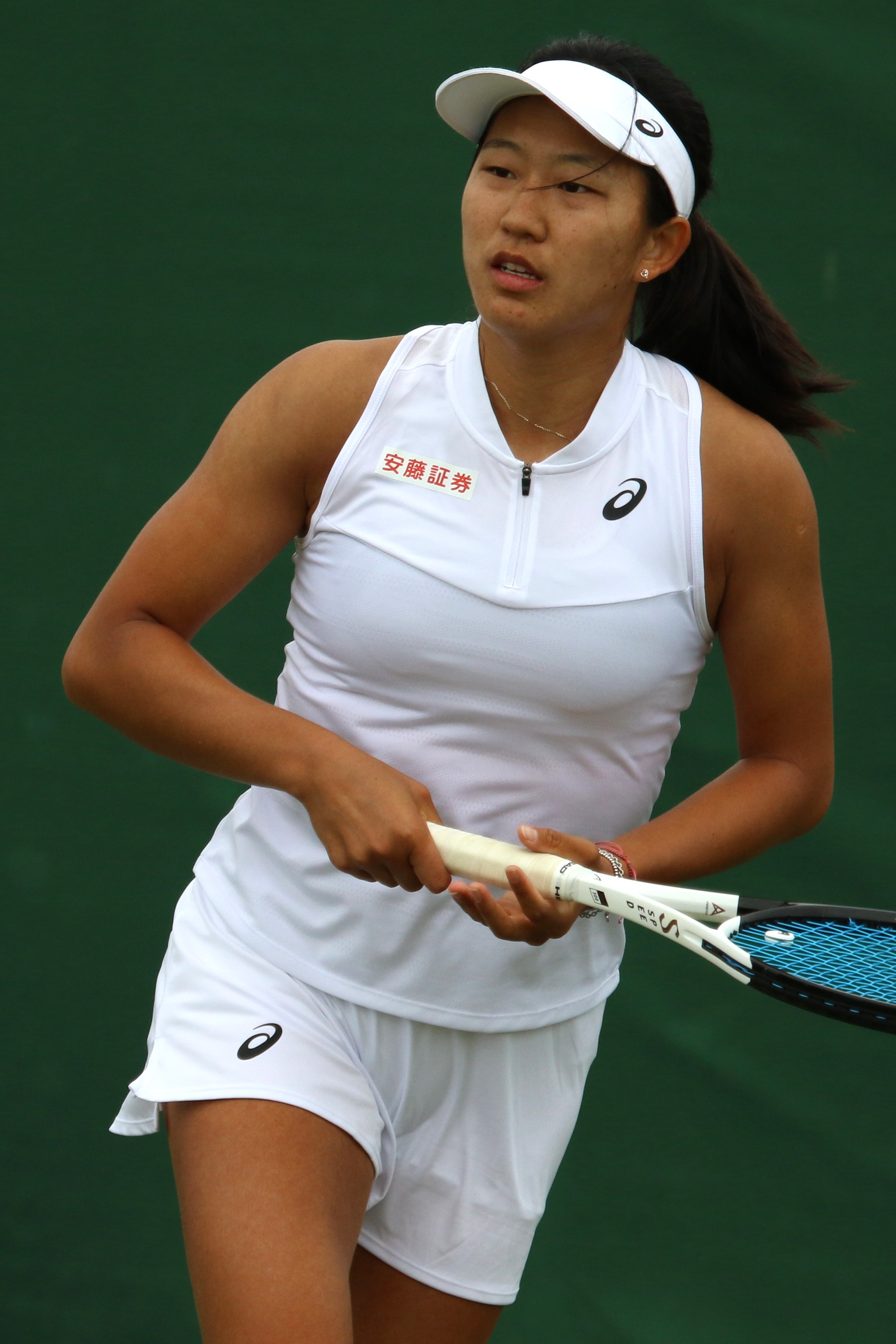
- Uchijima at the 2023 Wimbledon Championships
- Country (sports): Japan
- Born: 11 August 2001 (age 25) Kuala Lumpur, Malaysia
- Height: 1.74 m (5 ft 9 in)
- Plays: Right (two-handed backhand)
- Prize money: US$ 2,625,798

Singles
- Career record: 283–210
- Career titles: 2 WTA 125
- Highest ranking: No. 47 (5 May 2025)
- Current ranking: No. 123 (9 November 2026)

Grand Slam singles results
- Australian Open: 2R (2025, 2026)
- French Open: 2R (2024)
- Wimbledon: 1R (2024, 2025)
- US Open: 2R (2024, 2025)

Other tournaments
- Olympic Games: 1R (2024)

Doubles
- Career record: 122–105
- Career titles: 1 WTA, 11 ITF
- Highest ranking: No. 86 (21 July 2025)
- Current ranking: No. 369 (9 November 2026)

Grand Slam doubles results
- Australian Open: 2R (2023)
- French Open: 2R (2025)
- Wimbledon: 1R (2024, 2025)
- US Open: 2R (2026)

Team competitions
- Fed Cup: 8–6
- Last updated on: 9 November 2026.

Moyuka Uchijima (内島 萌夏, Uchijima Moyuka; born 11 August 2001) is a Japanese professional tennis player. She has a career-high singles ranking of world No. 47, achieved on 5 May 2025, and a best doubles ranking of 86, reached on 21 July 2025. She has won one WTA Tour doubles title and two WTA 125 singles titles. In addition, there are 24 titles (13 in singles) on tournaments of the ITF Circuit.

Competing for Japan in the BJK Cup, Uchijima has a win-loss record of 8–6 (all matches in singles).

She has a Malaysian mother and a Japanese father.

== Career ==
=== 2023-2024: Major debut, first WTA Tour doubles title ===
For her major debut, Uchijima received a wildcard from the 2023 Australian Open, but lost in the first round to Bernarda Pera.

She won three consecutive titles on the ITF Circuit in May 2024, reaching a career-high of world No. 80 on 20 May 2024 and making her the Japanese number-one female singles player for the first time.

Uchijima qualified for the French Open, her debut at this major, and defeated fellow qualifier Irene Burillo in the first round. She lost in the second round to the second seed, Aryna Sabalenka, in straight sets, ending a run of 19 consecutive professional match wins for Uchijima.

She qualified for the 2024 Canadian Open and recorded her first WTA 1000 win, over Viktoriya Tomova, before losing to sixth seed Liudmila Samsonova. As a result, she reached a new career-high ranking of No. 59, on 12 August 2024.

Making her debut at the US Open, Uchijima defeated Tamara Korpatsch in the first round, before losing her next match to Jule Niemeier.

In September at the WTA 250 Thailand Open 2, Uchijima reached her first WTA Tour doubles final partnering with Eudice Chong, but lost to top seeds Anna Danilina and Irina Khromacheva in the championship match.

Partnering with Guo Hanyu, she won her maiden WTA Tour doubles title at the 2024 Jiangxi Open, defeating Katarzyna Piter and Fanny Stollár in the final.

=== 2025: First WTA 1000 quarterfinal ===
Ranked world No. 63, Uchijima defeated Magda Linette to reach the second round at the Australian Open, where she lost to 14th seed Mirra Andreeva in a match which went to a deciding set tiebreak.

In February, at the Dubai Championships, Uchijima qualified for the main draw and recorded her first win against a top-30 ranked opponent by defeating world No. 26, Jeļena Ostapenko, before losing in the second round to sixth seed Elena Rybakina.

At the Madrid Open in April, Uchijima reached her first WTA 1000 quarterfinal with wins over wildcard entrant Robin Montgomery and 26th seed Ons Jabeur, then defeating world No. 3, Jessica Pegula, for her first victory over a top-25 ranked player, before overcoming 21st seed Ekaterina Alexandrova in the fourth round. She lost in the last eight to 17th seed Elina Svitolina.

Uchijima then went almost four months without registering a Tour-level singles win until finally ending her slump by defeating Olga Danilović at the US Open, after saving seven match points, before losing to Barbora Krejčíková in the second round.

=== 2026: First WTA 125 titles ===
Uchijima won her maiden WTA 125 singles title at the Antalya Challenger 1, defeating Anhelina Kalinina in the final, in straight sets. At the Open de Saint-Malo, she claimed her second WTA 125 singles trophy with a three-set win over top seed Tereza Valentová in the final.

== Performance timelines ==
Key
| W | F | SF | QF | #R | RR | Q# | P# | DNQ | A | Z# | PO | G | S | B | NMS | NTI | P | NH |

(W) winner; (F) finalist; (SF) semifinalist; (QF) quarterfinalist; (#R) rounds 4, 3, 2, 1; (RR) round-robin stage; (Q#) qualification round; (P#) preliminary round; (DNQ) did not qualify; (A) absent; (Z#) Davis/Fed Cup Zonal Group (with number indication) or (PO) play-off; (G) gold, (S) silver or (B) bronze Olympic/Paralympic medal; (NMS) not a Masters tournament; (NTI) not a Tier I tournament; (P) postponed; (NH) not held; (SR) strike rate (events won / competed); (W–L) win–loss record.
To avoid confusion and double counting, these charts are updated at the conclusion of a tournament or when the player's participation has ended.

Only main-draw results in WTA Tour, Grand Slam tournaments, Billie Jean King Cup, United Cup, Hopman Cup and Olympic Games are included in win–loss records.

=== Singles ===
Current through the 2026 US Open.

| Tournament | 2022 | 2023 | 2024 | 2025 | 2026 | SR | W–L | Win % |
|---|---|---|---|---|---|---|---|---|
Grand Slam tournaments
| Australian Open | A | 1R | Q2 | 2R | 2R | 0 / 3 | 2–3 | 40% |
| French Open | Q3 | Q3 | 2R | 1R | 1R | 0 / 3 | 1–3 | 25% |
| Wimbledon | Q1 | Q2 | 1R | 1R | Q1 | 0 / 2 | 0–2 | 0% |
| US Open | Q3 | Q3 | 2R | 2R | Q2 | 0 / 2 | 2–2 | 50% |
| Win–Loss | 0–0 | 0–1 | 2–3 | 2–4 | 1–2 | 0 / 10 | 5–10 | 33% |
National representation
| Summer Olympics | NH | | 1R | NH | | 0 / 1 | 0–1 | 0% |
| BJK Cup (Note: Formerly known as Fed Cup until 2020.) | PO | PO | QF | RR | | 0 / 2 | 8–5 | 62% |
WTA 1000 tournaments
| Qatar Open | A | A | A | 1R | 1R | 0 / 2 | 0–2 | 0% |
| Dubai Championships | A | A | A | 2R | 1R | 0 / 2 | 1–2 | 33% |
| Indian Wells Open | A | A | A | 2R | A | 0 / 1 | 1–1 | 50% |
| Miami Open | A | A | A | 2R | A | 0 / 1 | 1–1 | 50% |
| Madrid Open | A | Q1 | A | QF | 1R | 0 / 2 | 4–2 | 67% |
| Italian Open | A | Q1 | A | 1R | Q1 | 0 / 1 | 0–1 | 0% |
| Canadian Open | A | A | 2R | 1R | 2R | 0 / 3 | 2–3 | 40% |
| Cincinnati Open | A | A | Q1 | 1R | Q1 | 0 / 1 | 0–1 | 0% |
| China Open | NH | A | 2R | 1R | A | 0 / 2 | 1–2 | 33% |
| Wuhan Open | NH | | 1R | 2R | Q1 | 0 / 2 | 1–2 | 33% |
| Win–Loss | 0–0 | 0–0 | 2–3 | 8–10 | 1–4 | 0 / 17 | 11–17 | 39% |
Career statistics
| | 2022 | 2023 | 2024 | 2025 | 2026 | SR | W–L | Win % |
| Tournaments | 3 | 6 | 15 | 27 | 6 | Career total: 39 | | |
| Titles | 0 | 0 | 0 | 0 | 0 | Career total: 0 | | |
| Finals | 0 | 0 | 0 | 0 | 0 | Career total: 0 | | |
| Overall win–loss | 6–5 | 4–7 | 5–15 | 14–27 | 2–7 | 0 / 61 | 31–61 | 34% |
| Year-end ranking (Note: 2017: WTA ranking–807, 2018: WTA ranking–394, 2019: WTA ranking–583, 2020: WTA ranking–492, 2021: WTA ranking–499.) | 105 | 181 | 56 | 91 | | $2,625,798 | | |

=== Doubles ===
Current through the end of the 2025 season.

| Tournament | 2018 | 2019 | 2020 | 2021 | 2022 | 2023 | 2024 | 2025 | SR | W–L | Win % |
|---|---|---|---|---|---|---|---|---|---|---|---|
Grand Slam tournaments
| Australian Open | A | A | A | A | A | 2R | A | 1R | 0 / 2 | 1–2 | |
| French Open | A | A | A | A | A | A | A | 2R | 0 / 1 | 1–1 | |
| Wimbledon | A | A | NH | A | A | A | 1R | 1R | 0 / 2 | 0–2 | |
| US Open | A | A | A | A | A | A | 1R | A | 0 / 1 | 0–1 | |
| Win–Loss | 0–0 | 0–0 | 0–0 | 0–0 | 0–0 | 1–1 | 0–2 | 1–3 | 0 / 6 | 2–6 | |
Career statistics
| Tournaments | 1 | 1 | 0 | 0 | 2 | 4 | | | Career total: 8 | | |
| Overall win–loss | 0–1 | 0–1 | 0–0 | 0–0 | 2–2 | 2–4 | | | 0 / 8 | 4–8 | |
| Year-end ranking (Note: 2017: WTA ranking–1261.) | 850 | 262 | 240 | 312 | 124 | 145 | 114 | 188 | | | |

== WTA Tour finals ==
=== Doubles: 2 (1 title, 1 runner-up) ===
| Legend WTA 250 (1–1) | Finals by surface Hard (1–1) | Finals by setting Outdoors (1–1) |

| Result | W–L | Date | Tournament | Tier | Surface | Partner | Opponents | Score |
|---|---|---|---|---|---|---|---|---|
| Loss | 0–1 | Sep 2024 | Hua Hin Championships, Thailand | WTA 250 | Hard | (Hong Kong) Eudice Chong | (Kazakhstan) Anna Danilina (Russia) Irina Khromacheva | 4–6, 5–7 |
| Win | 1–1 | Nov 2024 | Jiangxi Open, China | WTA 250 | Hard | (China) Guo Hanyu | (Poland) Katarzyna Piter (Hungary) Fanny Stollár | 7–6^{(7–5)}, 7–5 |

== WTA 125 finals ==
=== Singles: 2 (2 titles) ===
| Result | W–L | Date | Tournament | Surface | Opponents | Score |
|---|---|---|---|---|---|---|
| Win | 1–0 | Feb 2026 | Antalya Challenger, Turkey | Clay | (Ukraine) Anhelina Kalinina | 7–5, 7–5 |
| Win | 2–0 | May 2026 | Open de Saint-Malo, France | Clay | (Czech Republic) Tereza Valentová | 6–7^{(2–7)}, 6–3, 6–1 |

=== Doubles: 1 (runner-up) ===
| Result | Date | Tournament | Surface | Partner | Opponents | Score |
|---|---|---|---|---|---|---|
| Loss | Aug 2022 | Concord Open, United States | Hard | (Thailand) Peangtarn Plipuech | (Russia) Varvara Flink (United States) CoCo Vandeweghe | 3–6, 6–7^{(3)} |

== ITF Circuit finals ==
=== Singles: 17 (13 titles, 4 runner-ups) ===
Legend
W100 tournaments (3–0)
W80 tournaments (0–1)
W60/75 tournaments (3–2)
W40/50 tournaments (2–0)
W25 tournaments (2–1)
W15 tournaments (3–0)

| Result | W–L | Date | Tournament | Tier | Surface | Opponent | Score |
|---|---|---|---|---|---|---|---|
| Loss | 0–1 | May 2018 | Kangaroo Cup, Japan | W80 | Hard | (Japan) Kurumi Nara | 2–6, 6–7^{(4)} |
| Win | 1–1 | Oct 2019 | ITF Hua Hin, Thailand | W15 | Hard | (Thailand) Mananchaya Sawangkaew | 6–2, 6–4 |
| Win | 2–1 | Aug 2021 | ITF Monastir, Tunisia | W15 | Hard | (United States) Jenna DeFalco | 7–5, 6–2 |
| Win | 3–1 | Sep 2021 | ITF Monastir, Tunisia | W15 | Hard | (Brazil) Ingrid Martins | 6–1, 6–4 |
| Win | 4–1 | Dec 2021 | Pune Championships, India | W25 | Hard | (Latvia) Diāna Marcinkēviča | 6–2, 7–5 |
| Win | 5–1 | Feb 2022 | Porto Indoor, Portugal | W25 | Hard (i) | (France) Léolia Jeanjean | 6–3, 6–1 |
| Win | 6–1 | Mar 2022 | Clay Court International, Australia | W60 | Clay | (Australia) Olivia Gadecki | 6–2, 6–2 |
| Loss | 6–2 | Jul 2022 | ITF Nur-Sultan, Kazakhstan | W25 | Hard | Mariia Tkacheva | 6–7^{(2)}, 2–6 |
| Win | 7–2 | Jul 2022 | President's Cup, Kazakhstan | W60 | Hard | (Serbia) Natalija Stevanović | 6–3, 7–6^{(2)} |
| Loss | 7–3 | Nov 2022 | Tokyo Open, Japan | W60 | Hard (i) | (China) Wang Xinyu | 6–1, 4–6, 6–3 |
| Loss | 7–4 | Mar 2023 | Nur-Sultan Challenger, Kazakhstan | W60 | Hard (i) | (South Korea) Jang Su-jeong | 1–6, 4–6 |
| Win | 8–4 | Dec 2023 | ITF Navi Mumbai, India | W40 | Hard | Ekaterina Makarova | 6–4, 6–1 |
| Win | 9–4 | Jan 2024 | Pune Championships, India | W50 | Hard | (Australia) Tina Nadine Smith | 6–4, 6–0 |
| Win | 10–4 | Apr 2024 | Zaragoza Open, Spain | W100 | Clay | (Spain) Jéssica Bouzas Maneiro | 6–1, 6–2 |
| Win | 11–4 | Apr 2024 | Kangaroo Cup, Japan | W100 | Hard | (Australia) Arina Rodionova | 6–3, 6–3 |
| Win | 12–4 | May 2024 | Empire Slovak Open, Slovakia | W75 | Clay | (Germany) Mona Barthel | 7–6^{(3)}, 6–3 |
| Win | 13–4 | May 2024 | Open Villa de Madrid, Spain | W100 | Clay | (Spain) Leyre Romero Gormaz | 5–7, 6–4, 7–5 |

=== Doubles: 16 (11 titles, 5 runner-ups) ===
Legend
W100 tournaments (1–0)
W60 tournaments (6–3)
W50 tournaments (1–0)
W25 tournaments (2–2)
W15 tournaments (1–0)

| Result | W–L | Date | Tournament | Tier | Surface | Partner | Opponents | Score |
|---|---|---|---|---|---|---|---|---|
| Win | 1–0 | Feb 2019 | Indoor Championships, Japan | W60 | Hard (i) | (Japan) Eri Hozumi | (Chinese Taipei) Chen Pei-hsuan (Chinese Taipei) Wu Fang-hsien | 6–4, 6–3 |
| Loss | 1–1 | May 2019 | Kurume Cup, Japan | W60 | Carpet | (Japan) Erina Hayashi | (Japan) Hiroko Kuwata (United States) Ena Shibahara | 6–0, 4–6, [5–10] |
| Win | 2–1 | Jun 2019 | Internacional de Barcelona, Spain | W60 | Clay | (Japan) Kyoka Okamura | (Spain) Marina Bassols Ribera (Spain) Yvonne Cavallé Reimers | 7–6^{(7)}, 6–4 |
| Loss | 2–2 | Jun 2019 | ITF Figueira da Foz, Portugal | W25 | Hard | (Brazil) Laura Pigossi | (Portugal) Francisca Jorge (Spain) Olga Parres Azcoitia | 4–6, 6–4, [9–11] |
| Loss | 2–3 | Jan 2020 | ITF Hong Kong, China SAR | W25 | Hard | (China) Zhang Ying | (Hong Kong) Eudice Chong (Chinese Taipei) Wu Fang-hsien | 6–7^{(2)}, 1–6 |
| Win | 3–3 | Feb 2020 | Indoor Championships, Japan (2) | W60 | Hard (i) | (Japan) Erina Hayashi | (Chinese Taipei) Hsieh Yu-chieh (Japan) Minori Yonehara | 7–5, 5–7, [10–6] |
| Win | 4–3 | Sep 2021 | ITF Monastir, Tunisia | W15 | Hard | (China) Ma Yexin | (Brazil) Ingrid Martins (Argentina) Jazmín Ortenzi | 6–2, 2–6, [10–6] |
| Win | 5–3 | Nov 2021 | ITF Ortisei, Italy | W25 | Hard (i) | (Hong Kong) Eudice Chong | (Switzerland) Susan Bandecchi (Switzerland) Ylena In-Albon | 6–2, 1–6, [10–5] |
| Win | 6–3 | Dec 2021 | ITF Selva Gardena, Italy | W25 | Hard (i) | (Hong Kong) Eudice Chong | (United Kingdom) Alicia Barnett (United Kingdom) Olivia Nicholls | 6–2, 6–1 |
| Loss | 6–4 | Mar 2022 | Clay Court International, Australia | W60 | Clay | (Japan) Yuki Naito | (South Korea) Han Na-lae (South Korea) Jang Su-jeong | 6–3, 2–6, [5–10] |
| Loss | 6–5 | Jul 2022 | President's Cup, Kazakhstan | W60 | Hard | (Japan) Momoko Kobori | Mariia Tkacheva; Anastasia Zolotareva | 6–4, 1–6, [4–10] |
| Win | 7–5 | Mar 2023 | ITF Jakarta, Indonesia | W60 | Hard | (China) Ma Yexin | (Thailand) Luksika Kumkhum (Thailand) Peangtarn Plipuech | 6–0, 6–2 |
| Win | 8–5 | Jun 2023 | Internazionali di Brescia, Italy | W60 | Clay | (Japan) Mai Hontama | Alena Fomina-Klotz (Australia) Olivia Tjandramulia | 6–1, 6–0 |
| Win | 9–5 | Jun 2023 | Internazionali di Caserta, Italy | W60 | Clay | Anastasia Tikhonova | (Greece) Despina Papamichail (Italy) Camilla Rosatello | 6–4, 6–2 |
| Win | 10–5 | Oct 2023 | Shenzhen Longhua Open, China | W100 | Hard | (France) Kristina Mladenovic | (Hungary) Tímea Babos (Ukraine) Kateryna Volodko | 6–2, 7–5 |
| Win | 11–5 | Mar 2024 | Trnava Indoor, Slovakia | W50 | Hard (i) | (Switzerland) Lulu Sun | (Poland) Weronika Falkowska (Hungary) Fanny Stollár | 6–4, 7–6^{(3)} |

== Wins against top 10 players ==
She has a 1–6 record against players who were, at the time the match was played, ranked in the top 10.

| No. | Player | Rk | Event | Surface | Rd | Score | Rk | Years | Ref |
|---|---|---|---|---|---|---|---|---|---|
| 1 | (United States) Jessica Pegula | 3 | Madrid Open, Spain | Clay | 3R | 6–3, 6–2 | 56 | 2025 | |

- Key: (Rk) first use, opponent rank; (Rd) round; (Rk) 2nd use, player rank; (Ref) reference; (F) final; (SF) semifinal; (QF) quarterfinal; (#R) rounds 4, 3, 2, 1; (RR) round-robin stage; (Q#) qualifying rounds or stages (3), 2, 1.
