= 2010 ITF Men's Circuit (January–March) =

International tennis tournament series

The 2010 ITF Men's Circuit is the 2010 edition of the third-tier tour for men's professional tennis. It is organised by the International Tennis Federation and is a tier below the ATP Challenger Tour. During January/March 2010 over 80 tournaments were played with the majority being played in January.

== Key ==
$15,000 tournaments
$10,000 tournaments

== January ==
| Week of | Tournament | Winner | Runners-up | Semifinalists | Quarterfinalists |
|---|---|---|---|---|---|
| January 11 | Great Britain F1 Futures; Glasgow, Great Britain; Hard (indoor) $15,000 | (United Kingdom) Chris Eaton; 6–4, 6–4 | (United Kingdom) Jamie Baker | (France) Gary Lugassy (Belgium) David Goffin | (Finland) Timo Nieminen (United Kingdom) Josh Goodall (France) Alexandre Renard (Italy) Stefano Galvani |
| January 11 | Great Britain F1 Futures; Glasgow, Great Britain; Hard (indoor) $15,000 | (United Kingdom) Chris Eaton (United Kingdom) Dominic Inglot; 4–6, 6–3, [10–2] | (France) Olivier Charroin (France) Alexandre Renard | (France) Gary Lugassy (Belgium) David Goffin | (Finland) Timo Nieminen (United Kingdom) Josh Goodall (France) Alexandre Renard (Italy) Stefano Galvani |
| January 11 | Germany F1 Futures; Schwieberdingen, Germany; Carpet (indoor) $10,000 | (Netherlands) Jesse Huta Galung; 6–2, 6–7^{(4–7)}, 6–3 | (Luxembourg) Gilles Müller | (France) Ludovic Walter (Germany) Holger Fischer | (Russia) Denis Matsukevich (Czech Republic) Jan Mertl (France) Grégoire Burquier (Czech Republic) Daniel Lustig |
| January 11 | Germany F1 Futures; Schwieberdingen, Germany; Carpet (indoor) $10,000 | (Netherlands) Jesse Huta Galung (Netherlands) Miliaan Niesten; 1–6, 7–6^{(8–6)}, [10–4] | (Germany) Philip Regnat (Germany) Marcel Zimmermann | (France) Ludovic Walter (Germany) Holger Fischer | (Russia) Denis Matsukevich (Czech Republic) Jan Mertl (France) Grégoire Burquier (Czech Republic) Daniel Lustig |
| January 11 | Spain F1 Futures; Ciutadella de Menorca, Spain; Clay $10,000 | (Italy) Francesco Aldi; 6–3, 7–5 | (Spain) Sergio Gutiérrez Ferrol | (Spain) Pablo Martín-Adalia (Hungary) Attila Balázs | (Australia) Clinton Thomson (Spain) Ignacio Coll Riudavets (Spain) Marcelo Palacios-Siegenthale (France) Axel Michon |
| January 11 | Spain F1 Futures; Ciutadella de Menorca, Spain; Clay $10,000 | (Spain) Ignacio Coll Riudavets (Spain) José Antonio Sánchez de Luna; 6–2, 6–3 | (Spain) Cesar Ferrer-Victoria (Spain) Marcelo Palacios-Siegenthale | (Spain) Pablo Martín-Adalia (Hungary) Attila Balázs | (Australia) Clinton Thomson (Spain) Ignacio Coll Riudavets (Spain) Marcelo Palacios-Siegenthale (France) Axel Michon |
| January 11 | USA F1 Futures; Plantation, United States; Clay $10,000 | (France) Benoît Paire; 6–2, 6–7^{(10–12)}, 7–5 | (Austria) Marco Mirnegg | (United Kingdom) Morgan Phillips (France) Jean-Noël Insausti | (United States) Scoville Jenkins (United States) Greg Ouellette (United States) Alexander Domijan (United States) Marcus Fugate |
| January 11 | USA F1 Futures; Plantation, United States; Clay $10,000 | (Italy) Stefano Ianni (Latvia) Deniss Pavlovs; 6–2, 6–2 | (United States) Marcus Fugate (The Bahamas) Timothy Neilly | (United Kingdom) Morgan Phillips (France) Jean-Noël Insausti | (United States) Scoville Jenkins (United States) Greg Ouellette (United States) Alexander Domijan (United States) Marcus Fugate |
| January 18 | Great Britain F2 Futures; Sheffield, Great Britain; Hard (indoor) $15,000 | (Italy) Stefano Galvani; 6–4, 4–6, 6–0 | (Belarus) Uladzimir Ignatik | (United Kingdom) Josh Goodall (Sweden) Ervin Eleskovic | (France) Romain Jouan (United Kingdom) Dominic Inglot (United Kingdom) Jamie Baker (France) Olivier Patience |
| January 18 | Great Britain F2 Futures; Sheffield, Great Britain; Hard (indoor) $15,000 | (France) Olivier Charroin (Latvia) Andis Juška; 6–2, 6–4 | (United Kingdom) Chris Eaton (United Kingdom) Dominic Inglot | (United Kingdom) Josh Goodall (Sweden) Ervin Eleskovic | (France) Romain Jouan (United Kingdom) Dominic Inglot (United Kingdom) Jamie Baker (France) Olivier Patience |
| January 18 | El Salvador F1 Futures; Santa Tecla, El Salvador; Clay $10,000 | (Slovenia) Borut Puc; 6–4, 6–7^{(2–7)}, 6–0 | (Brazil) Ricardo Siggia | (Mexico) Luis Díaz Barriga (United States) Ashwin Kumar | (Brazil) Danilo Ferraz (Latvia) Deniss Pavlovs (Ecuador) Emilio Gómez (Venezuela) Miguel Cicenia |
| January 18 | El Salvador F1 Futures; Santa Tecla, El Salvador; Clay $10,000 | (Ecuador) Julio César Campozano (Ecuador) Emilio Gómez; 6–4, 7–6^{(7–4)} | (United States) Conor Pollock (United States) Maciek Sykut | (Mexico) Luis Díaz Barriga (United States) Ashwin Kumar | (Brazil) Danilo Ferraz (Latvia) Deniss Pavlovs (Ecuador) Emilio Gómez (Venezuela) Miguel Cicenia |
| January 18 | Germany F2 Futures; Stuttgart, Germany; Hard (indoor) $10,000 | (Germany) Bastian Knittel; 7–6^{(7–5)}, 6–1 | (Poland) Grzegorz Panfil | (Germany) Gero Kretschmer (Germany) Jakob Sude | (Russia) Alexander Kudryavtsev (Netherlands) Jesse Huta Galung (Czech Republic) Jan Mertl (Germany) Nils Langer |
| January 18 | Germany F2 Futures; Stuttgart, Germany; Hard (indoor) $10,000 | (Germany) Kevin Deden (Germany) Bastian Knittel; 6–4, 6–7^{(3–7)}, [10–4] | (Germany) Dennis Blömke (Germany) Marc Meigel | (Germany) Gero Kretschmer (Germany) Jakob Sude | (Russia) Alexander Kudryavtsev (Netherlands) Jesse Huta Galung (Czech Republic) Jan Mertl (Germany) Nils Langer |
| January 18 | Spain F2 Futures; Cala Millor, Spain; Clay $10,000 | (Hungary) Attila Balázs; 6–7^{(3–7)}, 6–4, 6–1 | (Italy) Francesco Aldi | (Russia) Ivan Nedelko (France) Laurent Rochette | (Italy) Walter Trusendi (Australia) Clinton Thomson (Hungary) Ádám Kellner (Germany) Sascha Klör |
| January 18 | Spain F2 Futures; Cala Millor, Spain; Clay $10,000 | (Spain) Ignacio Coll Riudavets (Spain) José Antonio Sánchez de Luna; 6–4, 6–1 | (Spain) Cesar Ferrer-Victoria (Spain) Marcelo Palacios-Siegenthale | (Russia) Ivan Nedelko (France) Laurent Rochette | (Italy) Walter Trusendi (Australia) Clinton Thomson (Hungary) Ádám Kellner (Germany) Sascha Klör |
| January 18 | USA F2 Futures; Hollywood, United States; Clay $10,000 | (France) Éric Prodon; 6–4, 7–6^{(7–2)} | (Italy) Stefano Ianni | (United Kingdom) Alexander Ward (Dominican Republic) Víctor Estrella | (Slovakia) Matej Bočko (Italy) Matteo Viola (Finland) Juho Paukku (United States) Alexander Domijan |
| January 18 | USA F2 Futures; Hollywood, United States; Clay $10,000 | (Italy) Stefano Ianni (Italy) Matteo Viola; 6–7^{(1–7)}, 6–1, [10–7] | (Spain) Arnau Brugués Davi (Dominican Republic) Víctor Estrella | (United Kingdom) Alexander Ward (Dominican Republic) Víctor Estrella | (Slovakia) Matej Bočko (Italy) Matteo Viola (Finland) Juho Paukku (United States) Alexander Domijan |
| January 25 | Germany F3 Futures; Kaarst, Germany; Carpet (indoor) $15,000 | (Ukraine) Sergey Bubka; 6–1, 6–4 | (Netherlands) Jesse Huta Galung | (Montenegro) Daniel Danilović (Czech Republic) Ladislav Chramosta | (United Kingdom) Richard Bloomfield (Czech Republic) Pavel Šnobel (Germany) Dennis Blömke (Romania) Florin Mergea |
| January 25 | Germany F3 Futures; Kaarst, Germany; Carpet (indoor) $15,000 | (Luxembourg) Mike Scheidweller (France) Ludovic Walter; 7–6^{(12–10)}, 6–7^{(6–8)}, [10–4] | (Montenegro) Daniel Danilović (Czech Republic) Pavel Šnobel | (Montenegro) Daniel Danilović (Czech Republic) Ladislav Chramosta | (United Kingdom) Richard Bloomfield (Czech Republic) Pavel Šnobel (Germany) Dennis Blömke (Romania) Florin Mergea |
| January 25 | Morocco F1 Futures; Casablanca, Morocco; Clay $15,000 | (Slovakia) Martin Kližan; 6–7^{(1–7)}, 6–2, 6–0 | (Italy) Alberto Brizzi | (Italy) Simone Vagnozzi (Spain) Íñigo Cervantes Huegun | (Germany) Bastian Knittel (Morocco) Mehdi Ziadi (Portugal) Pedro Sousa (Morocco) Reda El Amrani |
| January 25 | Morocco F1 Futures; Casablanca, Morocco; Clay $15,000 | (Italy) Alberto Brizzi (Italy) Simone Vagnozzi; 6–3, 6–2 | (Hungary) Ádám Kellner (Slovakia) Martin Kližan | (Italy) Simone Vagnozzi (Spain) Íñigo Cervantes Huegun | (Germany) Bastian Knittel (Morocco) Mehdi Ziadi (Portugal) Pedro Sousa (Morocco) Reda El Amrani |
| January 25 | Argentina F1 Futures; Dolores, Argentina; Clay $10,000 | (Argentina) Jonathan Gonzalia; 6–3, 4–6, 6–1 | (Argentina) Martín Alund | (Argentina) Pablo Galdón (Argentina) Alejandro Fabbri | (Argentina) Juan-Pablo Amado (Argentina) Juan-Manuel Valverde (Argentina) Gonzalo Tur (Italy) Daniel Alejandro López |
| January 25 | Argentina F1 Futures; Dolores, Argentina; Clay $10,000 | (Argentina) Diego Cristin (Argentina) Andrés Molteni; 7–5, 6–7^{(6–8)}, [10–6] | (Argentina) Alejandro Fabbri (Argentina) Jonathan Gonzalia | (Argentina) Pablo Galdón (Argentina) Alejandro Fabbri | (Argentina) Juan-Pablo Amado (Argentina) Juan-Manuel Valverde (Argentina) Gonzalo Tur (Italy) Daniel Alejandro López |
| January 25 | France F1 Futures; Bagnoles-de-l'Orne, France; Clay (indoor) $10,000+H | (France) Grégoire Burquier; 4–6, 6–4, 6–4 | (Spain) José Checa Calvo | (France) Charles-Antoine Brézac (France) Kenny de Schepper | (France) Nicolas Renavand (France) Olivier Patience (France) Axel Michon (France) Gilles de Sousa |
| January 25 | France F1 Futures; Bagnoles-de-l'Orne, France; Clay (indoor) $10,000+H | (France) Morgan Mannarino (France) Florian Reynet; 6–3, 7–6^{(9–7)} | (France) Marc Auradou (France) Alexandre Renard | (France) Charles-Antoine Brézac (France) Kenny de Schepper | (France) Nicolas Renavand (France) Olivier Patience (France) Axel Michon (France) Gilles de Sousa |
| January 25 | Guatemala F1 Futures; Guatemala City, Guatemala; Hard $10,000 | (Romania) Marius Copil; 7–6^{(7–5)}, 7–6^{(7–3)} | (Ecuador) Iván Endara | (Peru) Mauricio Echazú (Ecuador) Julio César Campozano | (United States) Christopher Klingemann (Moldova) Roman Borvanov (Mexico) César Ramírez (Brazil) Ricardo Siggia |
| January 25 | Guatemala F1 Futures; Guatemala City, Guatemala; Hard $10,000 | (Romania) Marius Copil (Ecuador) Iván Endara; 7–5, 6–3 | (United States) Ruben Gonzales (United States) James Ludlow | (Peru) Mauricio Echazú (Ecuador) Julio César Campozano | (United States) Christopher Klingemann (Moldova) Roman Borvanov (Mexico) César Ramírez (Brazil) Ricardo Siggia |
| January 25 | Israel F1 Futures; Eilat, Israel; Hard $10,000 | (Slovakia) Andrej Martin; 6–2, 6–2 | (United States) Todd Paul | (United Kingdom) Josh Goodall (Italy) Thomas Fabbiano | (United Kingdom) David Rice (Estonia) Jürgen Zopp (Bulgaria) Valentin Dimov (China) Wu Di |
| January 25 | Israel F1 Futures; Eilat, Israel; Hard $10,000 | (Slovakia) Andrej Martin (Slovakia) Miloslav Mečíř Jr. 6–2, 6–3 | (China) Wu Di (China) Zhang Ze | (United Kingdom) Josh Goodall (Italy) Thomas Fabbiano | (United Kingdom) David Rice (Estonia) Jürgen Zopp (Bulgaria) Valentin Dimov (China) Wu Di |
| January 25 | Spain F3 Futures; Murcia, Spain; Hard $10,000 | (Spain) Roberto Bautista Agut; 7–5, 6–2 | (Spain) Sergio Gutiérrez Ferrol | (Spain) Georgi Rumenov Payakov (Italy) Walter Trusendi | (Spain) Gerard Granollers (Spain) Agustín Boje Ordóñez (France) Jeremy Blandin (Republic of Ireland) Barry King |
| January 25 | Spain F3 Futures; Murcia, Spain; Hard $10,000 | (France) Jeremy Blandin (France) Fabrice Martin; 6–2, 4–6, [10–8] | (Spain) Agustín Boje Ordóñez (Spain) Ignacio Coll Riudavets | (Spain) Georgi Rumenov Payakov (Italy) Walter Trusendi | (Spain) Gerard Granollers (Spain) Agustín Boje Ordóñez (France) Jeremy Blandin (Republic of Ireland) Barry King |
| January 25 | USA F3 Futures; Tamarac, United States; Clay $10,000 | (France) Éric Prodon; 2–6, 7–6^{(7–3)}, 6–4 | (Romania) Cătălin-Ionuț Gârd | (Italy) Matteo Viola (Austria) Christian Magg | (Italy) Alessandro Giannessi (United Kingdom) Morgan Phillips (Spain) Arnau Brugués Davi (United States) Alexander Domijan |
| January 25 | USA F3 Futures; Tamarac, United States; Clay $10,000 | (Romania) Cătălin-Ionuț Gârd (United States) Christian Guevara; 2–6, 6–4, [10–6] | (Italy) Stefano Ianni (Italy) Matteo Viola | (Italy) Matteo Viola (Austria) Christian Magg | (Italy) Alessandro Giannessi (United Kingdom) Morgan Phillips (Spain) Arnau Brugués Davi (United States) Alexander Domijan |

== February ==
| Week of | Tournament | Winner | Runners-up | Semifinalists | Quarterfinalists |
|---|---|---|---|---|---|
| February 1 | Germany F4 Futures; Nussloch, Germany; Carpet (indoor) $15,000 | (Belgium) Niels Desein; 6–7^{(2–7)}, 7–6^{(7–3)}, 7–6^{(8–6)} | (Netherlands) Thomas Schoorel | (Germany) Jan-Lennard Struff (Romania) Florin Mergea | (Poland) Dawid Olejniczak (Czech Republic) Daniel Lustig (Germany) Marc Meigel (Germany) Patrick Taubert |
| February 1 | Germany F4 Futures; Nussloch, Germany; Carpet (indoor) $15,000 | (Czech Republic) Roman Jebavý (Czech Republic) Daniel Lustig; 6–3, 7–6^{(7–5)} | (Germany) Martin Emmrich (Germany) Sebastian Rieschick | (Germany) Jan-Lennard Struff (Romania) Florin Mergea | (Poland) Dawid Olejniczak (Czech Republic) Daniel Lustig (Germany) Marc Meigel (Germany) Patrick Taubert |
| February 1 | Morocco F2 Futures; Rabat, Morocco; Clay $15,000 | (Algeria) Lamine Ouahab; 6–3, 6–3 | (France) Laurent Rochette | (Slovakia) Martin Kližan (Spain) Carles Poch Gradin | (Italy) Simone Vagnozzi (Spain) Guillermo Olaso (Germany) Bastian Knittel (Hungary) Ádám Kellner |
| February 1 | Morocco F2 Futures; Rabat, Morocco; Clay $15,000 | (Serbia) David Savić (United States) Denis Zivkovic; 6–4, 6–1 | (Tunisia) Malek Jaziri (Algeria) Lamine Ouahab | (Slovakia) Martin Kližan (Spain) Carles Poch Gradin | (Italy) Simone Vagnozzi (Spain) Guillermo Olaso (Germany) Bastian Knittel (Hungary) Ádám Kellner |
| February 1 | Argentina F2 Futures; Tandil, Argentina; Clay $10,000 | (Argentina) Juan-Manuel Valverde; 6–3, 4–6, 7–6^{(7–2)} | (Argentina) Jonathan Gonzalia | (Argentina) Agustín Velotti (Argentina) Facundo Argüello | (Argentina) Juan-Pablo Amado (Peru) Álvaro Raposo de Oliveira (Argentina) Pablo Galdón (Argentina) Rodrigo Gomez Saigos |
| February 1 | Argentina F2 Futures; Tandil, Argentina; Clay $10,000 | (Argentina) Martín Alund (Italy) Daniel Alejandro López; 6–3, 6–2 | (Uruguay) Martín Cuevas (Argentina) German Gaich | (Argentina) Agustín Velotti (Argentina) Facundo Argüello | (Argentina) Juan-Pablo Amado (Peru) Álvaro Raposo de Oliveira (Argentina) Pablo Galdón (Argentina) Rodrigo Gomez Saigos |
| February 1 | Egypt F1 Futures; Giza, Egypt; Clay $10,000 | (Czech Republic) Jaroslav Pospíšil; 6–2, 6–3 | (France) Axel Michon | (Germany) Denis Gremelmayr (Romania) Teodor-Dacian Crăciun | (Italy) Marco Viola (Italy) Marco Simoni (Czech Republic) Jiří Školoudík (Egypt) Karim Maamoun |
| February 1 | Egypt F1 Futures; Giza, Egypt; Clay $10,000 | (Spain) Gerard Granollers (Germany) Denis Gremelmayr; 6–4, 7–5 | (Egypt) Karim Maamoun (Egypt) Sherif Sabry | (Germany) Denis Gremelmayr (Romania) Teodor-Dacian Crăciun | (Italy) Marco Viola (Italy) Marco Simoni (Czech Republic) Jiří Školoudík (Egypt) Karim Maamoun |
| February 1 | France F2 Futures; Feucherolles, France; Hard (indoor) $10,000+H | (France) Charles-Antoine Brézac; 6–2, 6–1 | (Romania) Petru-Alexandru Luncanu | (Latvia) Andis Juška (France) Romain Jouan | (France) Grégoire Burquier (France) Olivier Patience (France) Gary Lugassy (France) Nicolas Renavand |
| February 1 | France F2 Futures; Feucherolles, France; Hard (indoor) $10,000+H | (France) Olivier Charroin (Latvia) Andis Juška; 5–7, 7–6^{(7–2)}, [10–7] | (France) Charles-Antoine Brézac (France) Vincent Stouff | (Latvia) Andis Juška (France) Romain Jouan | (France) Grégoire Burquier (France) Olivier Patience (France) Gary Lugassy (France) Nicolas Renavand |
| February 1 | Israel F2 Futures; Eilat, Israel; Hard $10,000 | (Slovakia) Andrej Martin; 6–1, 6–1 | (China) Zhang Ze | (China) Wu Di (Romania) Adrian Cruciat | (United Kingdom) Josh Goodall (Italy) Thomas Fabbiano (Slovakia) Miloslav Mečíř Jr. (Israel) Amir Weintraub |
| February 1 | Israel F2 Futures; Eilat, Israel; Hard $10,000 | (United States) Cory Parr (United States) Toddy Paul; 3–6, 6–3, [10–5] | (Slovakia) Andrej Martin (Slovakia) Miloslav Mečíř Jr. | (China) Wu Di (Romania) Adrian Cruciat | (United Kingdom) Josh Goodall (Italy) Thomas Fabbiano (Slovakia) Miloslav Mečíř Jr. (Israel) Amir Weintraub |
| February 1 | Panama F1 Futures; Panama City, Panama; Clay $10,000 | (Mexico) César Ramírez; 2–6, 6–3, 7–5 | (Ecuador) Julio César Campozano | (Italy) Federico Torresi (Italy) Andrea Falgheri | (United States) Ruben Gonzales (Ecuador) Emilio Gómez (Colombia) Eduardo Struvay (Colombia) Juan Sebastián Cabal |
| February 1 | Panama F1 Futures; Panama City, Panama; Clay $10,000 | (Colombia) Juan Sebastián Cabal (Colombia) Eduardo Struvay; 4–6, 6–3, [10–5] | (Italy) Andrea Falgheri (Italy) Federico Torresi | (Italy) Federico Torresi (Italy) Andrea Falgheri | (United States) Ruben Gonzales (Ecuador) Emilio Gómez (Colombia) Eduardo Struvay (Colombia) Juan Sebastián Cabal |
| February 1 | Spain F4 Futures; Murcia, Spain; Clay $10,000 | (Spain) Sergio Gutiérrez Ferrol; 7–5, 6–4 | (Spain) José Checa Calvo | (Spain) Albert Ramos (Spain) Pablo Carreño Busta | (Spain) Pablo Santos (Italy) Daniele Giorgini (Spain) Agustín Boje Ordóñez (Spain) Pedro Clar Rosselló |
| February 1 | Spain F4 Futures; Murcia, Spain; Clay $10,000 | (Italy) Daniele Giorgini (Italy) Walter Trusendi; 7–6^{(7–3)}, 6–1 | (Spain) Pablo Santos (Spain) Gabriel Trujillo Soler | (Spain) Albert Ramos (Spain) Pablo Carreño Busta | (Spain) Pablo Santos (Italy) Daniele Giorgini (Spain) Agustín Boje Ordóñez (Spain) Pedro Clar Rosselló |
| February 1 | USA F4 Futures; Palm Coast, United States; Clay $10,000 | (Austria) Marco Mirnegg; 6–1, 6–3 | (Dominican Republic) Víctor Estrella | (Italy) Stefano Ianni (Latvia) Adrians Žguns | (United States) Robbye Poole (Slovakia) Matej Bočko (Mexico) Daniel Garza (Russia) Artem Sitak |
| February 1 | USA F4 Futures; Palm Coast, United States; Clay $10,000 | (United States) Taylor Fogleman (United States) Benjamin Rogers; Walkover | (Mexico) Daniel Garza (United States) Eric Nunez | (Italy) Stefano Ianni (Latvia) Adrians Žguns | (United States) Robbye Poole (Slovakia) Matej Bočko (Mexico) Daniel Garza (Russia) Artem Sitak |
| February 8 | Mexico F1 Futures; Mexico City, Mexico; Hard $15,000 | (Spain) Arnau Brugués Davi; 6–2, 6–4 | (Mexico) Miguel Gallardo Valles | (Mexico) Víctor Romero (Mexico) Manuel Sánchez | (Mexico) Santiago González (Mexico) Bruno Rodríguez (Mexico) Miguel Ángel Reyes-Varela (Australia) Joel Lindner |
| February 8 | Mexico F1 Futures; Mexico City, Mexico; Hard $15,000 | (Mexico) Daniel Garza (Mexico) Bruno Rodríguez; 6–4, 7–5 | (Mexico) Luis Díaz Barriga (Mexico) Miguel Ángel Reyes-Varela | (Mexico) Víctor Romero (Mexico) Manuel Sánchez | (Mexico) Santiago González (Mexico) Bruno Rodríguez (Mexico) Miguel Ángel Reyes-Varela (Australia) Joel Lindner |
| February 8 | Argentina F3 Futures; Mar del Plata, Argentina; Clay $10,000 | (Argentina) Martín Alund; 7–5, 6–3 | (Argentina) Alejandro Fabbri | (Peru) Iván Miranda (Argentina) Diego Álvarez | (Argentina) Leandro Migani (Argentina) Andrés Molteni (Argentina) Christian Villagrán (Chile) Ricardo Urzúa-Rivera |
| February 8 | Argentina F3 Futures; Mar del Plata, Argentina; Clay $10,000 | (Argentina) Diego Cristin (Argentina) Andrés Molteni; 6–3, 6–4 | (Argentina) Alejandro Fabbri (Argentina) Diego Sebastián Schwartzman | (Peru) Iván Miranda (Argentina) Diego Álvarez | (Argentina) Leandro Migani (Argentina) Andrés Molteni (Argentina) Christian Villagrán (Chile) Ricardo Urzúa-Rivera |
| February 8 | Egypt F2 Futures; Giza, Egypt; Clay $10,000 | (France) Éric Prodon; 6–4, 6–3 | (France) Axel Michon | (Germany) Marcel Zimmermann (Italy) Matteo Marrai | (Egypt) Sherif Sabry (India) Karan Rastogi (Italy) Giulio Torroni (Germany) Marc-Andre Stratling |
| February 8 | Egypt F2 Futures; Giza, Egypt; Clay $10,000 | (Egypt) Karim Maamoun (Egypt) Sherif Sabry; 5–7, 6–4, [10–8] | (Spain) Gerard Granollers (Italy) Matteo Marrai | (Germany) Marcel Zimmermann (Italy) Matteo Marrai | (Egypt) Sherif Sabry (India) Karan Rastogi (Italy) Giulio Torroni (Germany) Marc-Andre Stratling |
| February 8 | France F3 Futures; Bressuire, France; Hard (indoor) $10,000+H | (Latvia) Andis Juška; 6–4, 6–4 | (Czech Republic) Lukáš Dlouhý | (France) Grégoire Burquier (France) Romain Jouan | (France) Tak Khunn Wang (Switzerland) Adrien Bossel (France) Charles-Antoine Brézac (France) Jonathan Eysseric |
| February 8 | France F3 Futures; Bressuire, France; Hard (indoor) $10,000+H | (France) Jérémy Blandin (France) Fabrice Martin; 4–6, 6–2, [10–3] | (France) Marc Auradou (France) Antoine Tassart | (France) Grégoire Burquier (France) Romain Jouan | (France) Tak Khunn Wang (Switzerland) Adrien Bossel (France) Charles-Antoine Brézac (France) Jonathan Eysseric |
| February 8 | Israel F3 Futures; Eilat, Israel; Hard $10,000 | (Slovakia) Miloslav Mečíř Jr. 6–4, 7–6^{(8–6)} | (Italy) Thomas Fabbiano | (Israel) Noam Okun (Romania) Victor Ioniță | (United States) Todd Paul (Belarus) Aliaksandr Bury (Greece) Theodoros Angelinos (Israel) Amir Weintraub |
| February 8 | Israel F3 Futures; Eilat, Israel; Hard $10,000 | (Republic of Ireland) James Cluskey (United States) Michael Venus; 6–7^{(3–7)}, 6–3, [15–13] | (Belarus) Aliaksandr Bury (Belarus) Pavel Katliarov | (Israel) Noam Okun (Romania) Victor Ioniță | (United States) Todd Paul (Belarus) Aliaksandr Bury (Greece) Theodoros Angelinos (Israel) Amir Weintraub |
| February 8 | Spain F5 Futures; Murcia, Spain; Clay $10,000 | (Spain) Pedro Clar-Rosseló; 6–4, 6–2 | (Spain) Pablo Santos | (Spain) Carlos Calderón-Rodríguez (Italy) Matteo Trevisan | (United Kingdom) Alexander Ward (United Kingdom) Joshua Milton (Italy) Daniele Giorgini (Spain) José Checa Calvo |
| February 8 | Spain F5 Futures; Murcia, Spain; Clay $10,000 | (Italy) Daniele Giorgini (Italy) Walter Trusendi; 6–2, 6–3 | (Spain) Pablo Santos (Spain) Gabriel Trujillo Soler | (Spain) Carlos Calderón-Rodríguez (Italy) Matteo Trevisan | (United Kingdom) Alexander Ward (United Kingdom) Joshua Milton (Italy) Daniele Giorgini (Spain) José Checa Calvo |
| February 15 | Australia F1 Futures; Mildura, Australia; Grass $15,000 | (New Zealand) Daniel King-Turner; 6–3, 6–7^{(4–7)}, 6–4 | (Australia) Colin Ebelthite | (Australia) Brydan Klein (Australia) Matthew Ebden | (Australia) Greg Jones (Australia) Mark Verryth (Australia) Sadik Kadir (India) Vishnu Vardhan |
| February 15 | Australia F1 Futures; Mildura, Australia; Grass $15,000 | (Australia) Matthew Ebden (Australia) Samuel Groth; 6–3, 4–6, [10–4] | (Australia) Adam Hubble (Australia) Sadik Kadir | (Australia) Brydan Klein (Australia) Matthew Ebden | (Australia) Greg Jones (Australia) Mark Verryth (Australia) Sadik Kadir (India) Vishnu Vardhan |
| February 15 | Azerbaijan F1 Futures; Baku, Azerbaijan; Hard (indoor) $15,000 | (Sweden) Ervin Eleskovic; 6–3, 6–2 | (Belarus) Siarhei Betau | (Poland) Jerzy Janowicz (Russia) Mikhail Ledovskikh | (Russia) Denis Matsukevich (Netherlands) Matwé Middelkoop (Russia) Valery Rudnev (Slovakia) Adrian Sikora |
| February 15 | Azerbaijan F1 Futures; Baku, Azerbaijan; Hard (indoor) $15,000 | (Romania) Petru-Alexandru Luncanu (Netherlands) Matwé Middelkoop; 6–7^{(7–9)}, 6–3, [12–10] | (China) Gong Maoxin (China) Li Zhe | (Poland) Jerzy Janowicz (Russia) Mikhail Ledovskikh | (Russia) Denis Matsukevich (Netherlands) Matwé Middelkoop (Russia) Valery Rudnev (Slovakia) Adrian Sikora |
| February 15 | B&H F1 Futures; Sarajevo, Bosnia & Herzegovina; Carpet (indoor) $15,000 | (Poland) Dawid Olejniczak; 6–4, 7–5 | (Bosnia and Herzegovina) Aldin Šetkić | (Bosnia and Herzegovina) Mirza Bašić (United Kingdom) Dominic Inglot | (Hungary) Kornél Bardóczky (Austria) Alexander Peya (Hungary) Ádám Kellner (United Kingdom) Chris Eaton |
| February 15 | B&H F1 Futures; Sarajevo, Bosnia & Herzegovina; Carpet (indoor) $15,000 | (Austria) Philipp Oswald (Austria) Alexander Peya; 6–3, 7–6^{(7–2)} | (Germany) Martin Emmrich (Sweden) Andreas Siljeström | (Bosnia and Herzegovina) Mirza Bašić (United Kingdom) Dominic Inglot | (Hungary) Kornél Bardóczky (Austria) Alexander Peya (Hungary) Ádám Kellner (United Kingdom) Chris Eaton |
| February 15 | USA F5 Futures; Brownsville, United States; Hard $15,000 | (Dominican Republic) Víctor Estrella; 6–4, 6–3 | (Canada) Vasek Pospisil | (Georgia (country)) Nikoloz Basilashvili (United States) Greg Ouellette | (Australia) Dayne Kelly (United States) Blake Strode (South Africa) Andrew Anderson (Finland) Timo Nieminen |
| February 15 | USA F5 Futures; Brownsville, United States; Hard $15,000 | (Spain) Arnau Brugués Davi (Dominican Republic) Víctor Estrella; 7–6^{(7–2)}, 6–3 | (United States) Brett Joelson (United States) Christopher Klingemann | (Georgia (country)) Nikoloz Basilashvili (United States) Greg Ouellette | (Australia) Dayne Kelly (United States) Blake Strode (South Africa) Andrew Anderson (Finland) Timo Nieminen |
| February 15 | Egypt F3 Futures; Giza, Egypt; Hard $10,000 | (Egypt) Karim Maamoun; 7–5, 6–3 | (Spain) Guillermo Alcaide | (France) Augustin Gensse (Spain) Gerard Granollers | (Egypt) Mohamed Safwat (France) François-Arthur Vibert (Italy) Matteo Marrai (India) Rohan Gajjar |
| February 15 | Egypt F3 Futures; Giza, Egypt; Hard $10,000 | (Spain) Guillermo Alcaide (Spain) Gerard Granollers; 3–6, 6–3, [11–9] | (Egypt) Karim Maamoun (Egypt) Sherif Sabry | (France) Augustin Gensse (Spain) Gerard Granollers | (Egypt) Mohamed Safwat (France) François-Arthur Vibert (Italy) Matteo Marrai (India) Rohan Gajjar |
| February 15 | Spain F6 Futures; Cartagena, Spain; Clay $10,000 | (Spain) Gabriel Trujillo Soler; 4–6, 7–6^{(6–2)}, 6–2 | (United Kingdom) Daniel Smethurst | (Australia) James Lemke (United Kingdom) Alexander Ward | (Spain) José Checa Calvo (Spain) Pablo Santos (Spain) Agustín Bogé-Ordóñez (Italy) Antonio Comporto |
| February 15 | Spain F6 Futures; Cartagena, Spain; Clay $10,000 | (United States) Connor Pollock (Serbia) David Savić; 7–6^{(8–6)}, 6–4 | (Spain) Pablo Santos (Spain) Gabriel Trujillo Soler | (Australia) James Lemke (United Kingdom) Alexander Ward | (Spain) José Checa Calvo (Spain) Pablo Santos (Spain) Agustín Bogé-Ordóñez (Italy) Antonio Comporto |
| February 22 | Australia F2 Futures; Berri, Australia; Grass $15,000 | (Australia) John Millman; 1–6, 6–4, 6–4 | (Australia) Greg Jones | (Australia) Samuel Groth (Australia) Matthew Ebden | (India) Vishnu Vardhan (Australia) Brydan Klein (Australia) Colin Ebelthite (New Zealand) José Statham |
| February 22 | Australia F2 Futures; Berri, Australia; Grass $15,000 | (Australia) Matthew Ebden (Australia) Samuel Groth; 6–3, 7–6^{(9–7)} | (Chinese Taipei) Huang Liang-chi (Chinese Taipei) Lee Hsin-han | (Australia) Samuel Groth (Australia) Matthew Ebden | (India) Vishnu Vardhan (Australia) Brydan Klein (Australia) Colin Ebelthite (New Zealand) José Statham |
| February 22 | Azerbaijan F2 Futures; Baku, Azerbaijan; Hard (indoor) $15,000 | (Poland) Jerzy Janowicz; 6–4, 7–6^{(8–6)} | (Russia) Mikhail Ledovskikh | (Russia) Denis Matsukevich (Sweden) Ervin Eleskovic | (Norway) Erling Tveit (Ukraine) Aleksandr Agafonov (Moldova) Andrei Gorban (Romania) Petru-Alexandru Luncanu |
| February 22 | Azerbaijan F2 Futures; Baku, Azerbaijan; Hard (indoor) $15,000 | (Netherlands) Matwé Middelkoop (Netherlands) Antal van der Duim; 7–6^{(10–8)}, 7–5 | (China) Wu Di (China) Zhang Ze | (Russia) Denis Matsukevich (Sweden) Ervin Eleskovic | (Norway) Erling Tveit (Ukraine) Aleksandr Agafonov (Moldova) Andrei Gorban (Romania) Petru-Alexandru Luncanu |
| February 22 | B&H F2 Futures; Sarajevo, Bosnia & Herzegovina; Carpet (indoor) $15,000 | (Finland) Henri Kontinen; 6–3, 7–6^{(7–4)} | (Austria) Alexander Peya | (Russia) Evgeny Donskoy (Germany) Dennis Blömke | (Poland) Dawid Olejniczak (Croatia) Ante Pavić (Bosnia and Herzegovina) Damir Džumhur (France) Gary Lugassy |
| February 22 | B&H F2 Futures; Sarajevo, Bosnia & Herzegovina; Carpet (indoor) $15,000 | (United Kingdom) Chris Eaton (United Kingdom) Dominic Inglot; Walkover | (Republic of Ireland) James McGee (Republic of Ireland) Colin O'Brien | (Russia) Evgeny Donskoy (Germany) Dennis Blömke | (Poland) Dawid Olejniczak (Croatia) Ante Pavić (Bosnia and Herzegovina) Damir Džumhur (France) Gary Lugassy |
| February 22 | USA F6 Futures; Harlingen, United States; Hard $15,000 | (Spain) Arnau Brugués Davi; 7–6^{(7–2)}, 6–3 | (Russia) Andrey Kumantsov | (Australia) Jared Easton (Romania) Cătălin-Ionuț Gârd | (United Kingdom) Richard Bloomfield (United States) Alexander Domijan (Serbia) Vladimir Obradović (Slovakia) Matej Bočko |
| February 22 | USA F6 Futures; Harlingen, United States; Hard $15,000 | (Romania) Cătălin-Ionuț Gârd (Russia) Artem Sitak; 6–4, 7–6^{(7–3)} | (Slovakia) Matej Bočko (Serbia) Vladimir Obradović | (Australia) Jared Easton (Romania) Cătălin-Ionuț Gârd | (United Kingdom) Richard Bloomfield (United States) Alexander Domijan (Serbia) Vladimir Obradović (Slovakia) Matej Bočko |

== March ==
| Week of | Tournament | Winner | Runners-up | Semifinalists | Quarterfinalists |
|---|---|---|---|---|---|
| March 1 | USA F7 Futures; McAllen, United States; Hard $15,000 | (Russia) Artem Sitak; 6–1, 6–4 | (Croatia) Mario Ančić | (Spain) Arnau Brugués Davi (Romania) Cătălin-Ionuț Gârd | (Slovakia) Matej Bočko (Australia) Jared Easton (Australia) Dayne Kelly (Russia) Andrey Kumantsov |
| March 1 | USA F7 Futures; McAllen, United States; Hard $15,000 | (Georgia (country)) Nikoloz Basilashvili (Chinese Taipei) Chen Ti; 7–5, 4–6, [10–4] | (Australia) Jared Easton (Australia) Matheson Klein | (Spain) Arnau Brugués Davi (Romania) Cătălin-Ionuț Gârd | (Slovakia) Matej Bočko (Australia) Jared Easton (Australia) Dayne Kelly (Russia) Andrey Kumantsov |
| March 1 | Canada F1 Futures; Gatineau, Canada; Hard (indoor) $10,000 | (Sweden) Michael Ryderstedt; 6–4, 5–7, 6–4 | (Switzerland) Adrien Bossel | (Israel) Amir Weintraub (United States) Robbye Poole | (United States) Marcus Fugate (Sweden) Milos Sekulic (Slovakia) Miloslav Mečíř Jr. (France) Jérôme Inzerillo |
| March 1 | Canada F1 Futures; Gatineau, Canada; Hard (indoor) $10,000 | (Montenegro) Daniel Danilović (Sweden) Michael Ryderstedt; 6–2, 7–6^{(7–4)} | (United States) Cory Parr (United States) Todd Paul | (Israel) Amir Weintraub (United States) Robbye Poole | (United States) Marcus Fugate (Sweden) Milos Sekulic (Slovakia) Miloslav Mečíř Jr. (France) Jérôme Inzerillo |
| March 1 | Portugal F1 Futures; Faro, Portugal; Hard $10,000 | (France) Benoît Paire; 3–6, 6–4, 6–2 | (Romania) Adrian Cruciat | (Spain) Guillermo Alcaide (France) Augustin Gensse | (Romania) Victor Ioniță (Netherlands) Thomas Schoorel (France) Baptiste Dupuy (Romania) Teodor-Dacian Crăciun |
| March 1 | Portugal F1 Futures; Faro, Portugal; Hard $10,000 | (France) Thomas Cazes-Carrère (France) Benoît Paire; 7–6^{(8–6)}, 7–6^{(7–3)} | (Poland) Piotr Gadomski (Poland) Mateusz Szmigiel | (Spain) Guillermo Alcaide (France) Augustin Gensse | (Romania) Victor Ioniță (Netherlands) Thomas Schoorel (France) Baptiste Dupuy (Romania) Teodor-Dacian Crăciun |
| March 1 | Spain F7 Futures; Terrassa, Spain; Clay $10,000 | (Spain) Gabriel Trujillo Soler; 7–5, 6–2 | (Spain) Pedro Clar Rosselló | (Spain) Pablo Carreño Busta (Spain) Guillermo Olaso | (Spain) Ignacio Coll Riudavets (Tunisia) Malek Jaziri (Spain) Carles Poch Gradin (Spain) Íñigo Cervantes Huegun |
| March 1 | Spain F7 Futures; Terrassa, Spain; Clay $10,000 | (Spain) Carlos Rexach-Itoiz (Spain) Gabriel Trujillo Soler; 6–3, 7–6^{(6–2)} | (Spain) José Checa Calvo (Spain) Pedro Clar Rosselló | (Spain) Pablo Carreño Busta (Spain) Guillermo Olaso | (Spain) Ignacio Coll Riudavets (Tunisia) Malek Jaziri (Spain) Carles Poch Gradin (Spain) Íñigo Cervantes Huegun |
| March 1 | Turkey F1 Futures; Antalya, Turkey; Clay $10,000 | (Netherlands) Jesse Huta Galung; 7–6^{(7–4)}, 6–0 | (France) Éric Prodon | (Austria) Marco Mirnegg (Italy) Enrico Burzi | (Italy) Thomas Fabbiano (Moldova) Andrei Gorban (Switzerland) Yann Marti (Romania) Andrei Mlendea |
| March 1 | Turkey F1 Futures; Antalya, Turkey; Clay $10,000 | (Austria) Marco Mirnegg (Austria) Herbert Wiltschnig; 6–1, 6–2 | (Netherlands) Jesse Huta Galung (France) Éric Prodon | (Austria) Marco Mirnegg (Italy) Enrico Burzi | (Italy) Thomas Fabbiano (Moldova) Andrei Gorban (Switzerland) Yann Marti (Romania) Andrei Mlendea |
| March 8 | France F4 Futures; Lille, France; Hard (indoor) $15,000 | (Belgium) Ruben Bemelmans; 6–4, 6–2 | (Belgium) Niels Desein | (Russia) Denis Matsukevich (Belgium) Yannick Mertens | (France) Nicolas Renavand (France) Romain Jouan (France) Charles-Antoine Brézac (France) Pierre-Hugues Herbert |
| March 8 | France F4 Futures; Lille, France; Hard (indoor) $15,000 | (Belgium) Ruben Bemelmans (Belgium) Niels Desein; 7–6^{(7–4)}, 6–3 | (South Africa) Raven Klaasen (South Africa) Izak van der Merwe | (Russia) Denis Matsukevich (Belgium) Yannick Mertens | (France) Nicolas Renavand (France) Romain Jouan (France) Charles-Antoine Brézac (France) Pierre-Hugues Herbert |
| March 8 | Great Britain F3 Futures; Tipton, Great Britain; Hard (indoor) $15,000 | (Spain) Roberto Bautista Agut; 7–5, 6–4 | (United Kingdom) Daniel Smethurst | (Slovakia) Kamil Čapkovič (France) Ludovic Walter | (United Kingdom) Burnham Arlidge (Slovakia) Andrej Martin (France) Gleb Sakharov (United Kingdom) Daniel Evans |
| March 8 | Great Britain F3 Futures; Tipton, Great Britain; Hard (indoor) $15,000 | (Slovakia) Kamil Čapkovič (Slovakia) Andrej Martin; 6–0, 6–2 | (France) Olivier Charroin (France) Ludovic Walter | (Slovakia) Kamil Čapkovič (France) Ludovic Walter | (United Kingdom) Burnham Arlidge (Slovakia) Andrej Martin (France) Gleb Sakharov (United Kingdom) Daniel Evans |
| March 8 | Canada F2 Futures; Montreal, Canada; Hard (indoor) $10,000 | (Switzerland) Adrien Bossel; 6–7^{(4–7)}, 6–4, 6–4 | (Finland) Juho Paukku | (United Kingdom) David Rice (Slovakia) Miloslav Mečíř Jr. | (France) Jérôme Inzerillo (France) Jean-Noël Insausti (United States) Ashwin Kumar (United States) Adam El Mihdawy |
| March 8 | Canada F2 Futures; Montreal, Canada; Hard (indoor) $10,000 | (United States) Cory Parr (United States) Todd Paul; 7–6^{(8–6)}, 7–6^{(6–2)} | (Montenegro) Daniel Danilović (Sweden) Michael Ryderstedt | (United Kingdom) David Rice (Slovakia) Miloslav Mečíř Jr. | (France) Jérôme Inzerillo (France) Jean-Noël Insausti (United States) Ashwin Kumar (United States) Adam El Mihdawy |
| March 8 | Portugal F2 Futures; Lagos, Portugal; Hard $10,000 | (Spain) Guillermo Alcaide; 6–4, 4–6, 6–3 | (France) Benoît Paire | (Ecuador) Julio César Campozano (Netherlands) Thomas Schoorel | (Italy) Francesco Piccari (Romania) Victor Ioniță (France) Florian Reynet (Romania) Adrian Cruciat |
| March 8 | Portugal F2 Futures; Lagos, Portugal; Hard $10,000 | (Romania) Adrian Cruciat (Romania) Victor Ioniță; 6–4, 6–3 | (Spain) David Cañudas-Fernández (Spain) Javier Martí | (Ecuador) Julio César Campozano (Netherlands) Thomas Schoorel | (Italy) Francesco Piccari (Romania) Victor Ioniță (France) Florian Reynet (Romania) Adrian Cruciat |
| March 8 | Spain F8 Futures; Sabadell, Spain; Hard $10,000 | (Spain) Gabriel Trujillo Soler; 6–2, 6–2 | (Italy) Alessio di Mauro | (Spain) Guillermo Olaso (Spain) Pablo Santos | (Italy) Gianluca Naso (Italy) Simone Vagnozzi (Spain) José Checa Calvo (Poland) Adam Chadaj |
| March 8 | Spain F8 Futures; Sabadell, Spain; Hard $10,000 | (Spain) Ignacio Coll Riudavets (Spain) Gerard Granollers; 7–5, 6–3 | (Belgium) Bart Govaerts (Spain) Jordi Samper Montaña | (Spain) Guillermo Olaso (Spain) Pablo Santos | (Italy) Gianluca Naso (Italy) Simone Vagnozzi (Spain) José Checa Calvo (Poland) Adam Chadaj |
| March 8 | Switzerland F1 Futures; Taverne, Switzerland; Carpet (indoor) $10,000 | (Italy) Luca Vanni; 6–3, 6–3 | (Germany) Marc Meigel | (Romania) Marius Copil (France) Baptiste Bayet | (Switzerland) Michael Lammer (Poland) Marcin Gawron (Switzerland) Mathieu Guenat (Switzerland) Sandro Ehrat |
| March 8 | Switzerland F1 Futures; Taverne, Switzerland; Carpet (indoor) $10,000 | (Poland) Marcin Gawron (Poland) Dawid Olejniczak; 6–1, 7–6^{(7–5)} | (France) Jérémy Blandin (Switzerland) Alexander Sadecky | (Romania) Marius Copil (France) Baptiste Bayet | (Switzerland) Michael Lammer (Poland) Marcin Gawron (Switzerland) Mathieu Guenat (Switzerland) Sandro Ehrat |
| March 8 | Turkey F2 Futures; Antalya, Turkey; Clay $10,000 | (Italy) Thomas Fabbiano; 6–3, 6–4 | (Slovakia) Pavol Červenák | (Serbia) David Savić (Greece) Theodoros Angelinos | (France) Julien Obry (France) Maxime Teixeira (Germany) Gero Kretschmer (France) Éric Prodon |
| March 8 | Turkey F2 Futures; Antalya, Turkey; Clay $10,000 | (Ukraine) Stanislav Poplavskyy (Ukraine) Artem Smirnov; 6–7^{(4–7)}, 6–3, [10–6] | (Italy) Thomas Fabbiano (Italy) Matteo Trevisan | (Serbia) David Savić (Greece) Theodoros Angelinos | (France) Julien Obry (France) Maxime Teixeira (Germany) Gero Kretschmer (France) Éric Prodon |
| March 15 | China F1 Futures; Kaiyuan, China; Hard $15,000 | (Italy) Riccardo Ghedin; 6–3, 6–4 | (France) Fabrice Martin | (Australia) Sadik Kadir (South Korea) Cho Soong-jae | (China) Gong Maoxin (China) Chang Yu (Chinese Taipei) Yang Tsung-hua (China) Zhang Ze |
| March 15 | China F1 Futures; Kaiyuan, China; Hard $15,000 | (Australia) Sadik Kadir (India) Purav Raja; 4–6, 6–3, [11–9] | (Chinese Taipei) Lee Hsin-han (Chinese Taipei) Yang Tsung-hua | (Australia) Sadik Kadir (South Korea) Cho Soong-jae | (China) Gong Maoxin (China) Chang Yu (Chinese Taipei) Yang Tsung-hua (China) Zhang Ze |
| March 15 | France F5 Futures; Poitiers, France; Hard (indoor) $15,000+H | (Belgium) Ruben Bemelmans; 6–4, 4–6, 6–4 | (France) Charles-Antoine Brézac | (France) Sébastien de Chaunac (United States) Ryler DeHeart | (Latvia) Andis Juška (South Africa) Izak van der Merwe (France) Vincent Stouff (Belgium) Niels Desein |
| March 15 | France F5 Futures; Poitiers, France; Hard (indoor) $15,000+H | (Belgium) Ruben Bemelmans (Belgium) Yannick Mertens; 3–6, 6–1, [10–6] | (France) Olivier Patience (France) Nicolas Renavand | (France) Sébastien de Chaunac (United States) Ryler DeHeart | (Latvia) Andis Juška (South Africa) Izak van der Merwe (France) Vincent Stouff (Belgium) Niels Desein |
| March 15 | Great Britain F4 Futures; Bath, Great Britain; Hard (indoor) $15,000 | (Slovakia) Andrej Martin; 2–6, 6–2, 7–6^{(7–4)} | (Netherlands) Igor Sijsling | (Spain) Roberto Bautista Agut (United Kingdom) Alexander Ward | (Denmark) Frederik Nielsen (Australia) Samuel Groth (United Kingdom) Chris Priddle (United Kingdom) Josh Goodall |
| March 15 | Great Britain F4 Futures; Bath, Great Britain; Hard (indoor) $15,000 | (Slovakia) Kamil Čapkovič (Slovakia) Andrej Martin; 7–6^{(7–1)}, 6–3 | (United Kingdom) Tim Bradshaw (Australia) John Millman | (Spain) Roberto Bautista Agut (United Kingdom) Alexander Ward | (Denmark) Frederik Nielsen (Australia) Samuel Groth (United Kingdom) Chris Priddle (United Kingdom) Josh Goodall |
| March 15 | Italy F1 Futures; Trento, Italy; Hard (indoor) $15,000 | (Austria) Johannes Ager; 6–3, 5–7, 6–4 | (Italy) Stefano Galvani | (Austria) Andreas Haider-Maurer (Romania) Petru-Alexandru Luncanu | (Sweden) Filip Prpic (Monaco) Thomas Oger (Italy) Simone Vagnozzi (Italy) Andrea Stoppini |
| March 15 | Italy F1 Futures; Trento, Italy; Hard (indoor) $15,000 | (Belarus) Nikolai Fidirko (Austria) Nikolaus Moser; 6–4, 6–4 | (Italy) Federico Gaio (Italy) Alessandro Giannessi | (Austria) Andreas Haider-Maurer (Romania) Petru-Alexandru Luncanu | (Sweden) Filip Prpic (Monaco) Thomas Oger (Italy) Simone Vagnozzi (Italy) Andrea Stoppini |
| March 15 | Kazakhstan F1 Futures; Astana, Kazakhstan; Hard (indoor) $15,000 | (Russia) Alexander Kudryavtsev; 6–4, 6–3 | (Russia) Evgeny Donskoy | (Ukraine) Denys Molchanov (Slovakia) Marek Semjan | (Russia) Mikhail Ledovskikh (Russia) Ilya Belyaev (Russia) Andrey Kuznetsov (Austria) Alexander Peya |
| March 15 | Kazakhstan F1 Futures; Astana, Kazakhstan; Hard (indoor) $15,000 | (Russia) Evgeny Kirillov (Russia) Alexander Kudryavtsev; 6–3, 6–4 | (Austria) Alexander Peya (United Kingdom) Alexander Slabinsky | (Ukraine) Denys Molchanov (Slovakia) Marek Semjan | (Russia) Mikhail Ledovskikh (Russia) Ilya Belyaev (Russia) Andrey Kuznetsov (Austria) Alexander Peya |
| March 15 | Canada F3 Futures; Sherbrooke, Canada; Hard (indoor) $10,000 | (Canada) Vasek Pospisil; 6–4, 4–6, 6–3 | (Canada) Milos Raonic | (United States) Adam El Mihdawy (France) Jean-Noël Insausti | (Canada) Érik Chvojka (Sweden) Milos Sekulic (South Africa) Andrew Anderson (Sweden) Michael Ryderstedt |
| March 15 | Canada F3 Futures; Sherbrooke, Canada; Hard (indoor) $10,000 | (United States) Cory Parr (United States) Toddy Paul; 6–4, 6–4 | (Canada) Vasek Pospisil (Canada) Milos Raonic | (United States) Adam El Mihdawy (France) Jean-Noël Insausti | (Canada) Érik Chvojka (Sweden) Milos Sekulic (South Africa) Andrew Anderson (Sweden) Michael Ryderstedt |
| March 15 | Croatia F1 Futures; Poreč, Croatia; Clay $10,000 | (Czech Republic) Jaroslav Pospíšil; 2–6, 6–3, 6–3 | (Hungary) Attila Balázs | (United States) Andrea Collarini (Croatia) Nikola Mektić | (United States) Denis Zivkovic (Austria) Christian Magg (Australia) Clinton Thomson (Italy) Matteo Viola |
| March 15 | Croatia F1 Futures; Poreč, Croatia; Clay $10,000 | (Spain) Carles Poch Gradin (Italy) Matteo Viola; 7–6^{(7–3)}, 6–4 | (Hungary) Attila Balázs (Bosnia and Herzegovina) Ismar Gorčić | (United States) Andrea Collarini (Croatia) Nikola Mektić | (United States) Denis Zivkovic (Austria) Christian Magg (Australia) Clinton Thomson (Italy) Matteo Viola |
| March 15 | India F1 Futures; Kolkata, India; Hard $10,000 | (United States) Nathan Thompson; 4–6, 6–2, 7–5 | (India) Rupesh Roy | (India) Vijay Sundar Prashanth (Czech Republic) Roman Jebavý | (Israel) Almog Mashiach (India) Karan Rastogi (India) Ranjeet Virali-Murugesan (United States) Chris Kwon |
| March 15 | India F1 Futures; Kolkata, India; Hard $10,000 | (India) Vivek Shokeen (India) Ashutosh Singh; 6–3, 6–2 | (India) Divij Sharan (India) Vishnu Vardhan | (India) Vijay Sundar Prashanth (Czech Republic) Roman Jebavý | (Israel) Almog Mashiach (India) Karan Rastogi (India) Ranjeet Virali-Murugesan (United States) Chris Kwon |
| March 15 | Japan F1 Futures; Tokyo, Japan; Hard $10,000 | (Japan) Yuichi Ito; 7–5, 1–6, 6–4 | (Japan) Hiroki Moriya | (Japan) Shuichi Sekiguchi (United States) Maciek Sykut | (Japan) Hiroki Kondo (Thailand) Weerapat Doakmaiklee (Japan) Tasuku Iwami (Japan) Arata Onozawa |
| March 15 | Japan F1 Futures; Tokyo, Japan; Hard $10,000 | (Japan) Bumpei Sato (Chinese Taipei) Yi Chu-huan; 6–4, 6–4 | (Japan) Tasuku Iwami (Japan) Hiroki Kondo | (Japan) Shuichi Sekiguchi (United States) Maciek Sykut | (Japan) Hiroki Kondo (Thailand) Weerapat Doakmaiklee (Japan) Tasuku Iwami (Japan) Arata Onozawa |
| March 15 | Portugal F3 Futures; Albufeira, Portugal; Hard $10,000 | (France) Benoît Paire; 7–6^{(7–5)}, 6–4 | (Netherlands) Thomas Schoorel | (Italy) Francesco Piccari (Spain) Agustín Boje Ordóñez | (Romania) Victor Ioniță (Portugal) Pedro Sousa (Brazil) André Miele (Sweden) Ervin Eleskovic |
| March 15 | Portugal F3 Futures; Albufeira, Portugal; Hard $10,000 | (Brazil) Diego Matos (Brazil) André Miele; 6–1, 6–4 | (Portugal) Frederico Ferreira Silva (Portugal) Diogo Soares | (Italy) Francesco Piccari (Spain) Agustín Boje Ordóñez | (Romania) Victor Ioniță (Portugal) Pedro Sousa (Brazil) André Miele (Sweden) Ervin Eleskovic |
| March 15 | Spain F9 Futures; Badalona, Spain; Clay $10,000 | (Spain) Gabriel Trujillo Soler; 6–3, 4–6, 6–4 | (Spain) Pablo Santos | (Spain) Guillermo Olaso (Spain) Marc Fornell Mestres | (Spain) Pablo Carreño Busta (Spain) Carlos Boluda-Purkiss (Spain) Jordi Samper Montaña (Ecuador) Julio César Campozano |
| March 15 | Spain F9 Futures; Badalona, Spain; Clay $10,000 | (Spain) Ignacio Coll Riudavets (Spain) Gerard Granollers; 6–4, 6–2 | (Russia) Ivan Nedelko (Spain) Roberto Rodríguez-Alonso | (Spain) Guillermo Olaso (Spain) Marc Fornell Mestres | (Spain) Pablo Carreño Busta (Spain) Carlos Boluda-Purkiss (Spain) Jordi Samper Montaña (Ecuador) Julio César Campozano |
| March 15 | Switzerland F2 Futures; Wetzikon, Switzerland; Carpet (indoor) $10,000 | (Netherlands) Matwé Middelkoop; 6–3, 6–4 | (Switzerland) Sandro Ehrat | (Austria) Nicolas Reissig (Poland) Grzegorz Panfil | (France) Jérémy Blandin (Italy) Walter Trusendi (Germany) Marc Meigel (Finland) Henri Laaksonen |
| March 15 | Switzerland F2 Futures; Wetzikon, Switzerland; Carpet (indoor) $10,000 | (Germany) Kevin Krawietz (Germany) Marcel Zimmermann; 6–2, 3–6, [10–5] | (Italy) Walter Trusendi (Estonia) Jürgen Zopp | (Austria) Nicolas Reissig (Poland) Grzegorz Panfil | (France) Jérémy Blandin (Italy) Walter Trusendi (Germany) Marc Meigel (Finland) Henri Laaksonen |
| March 15 | Turkey F3 Futures; Antalya, Turkey; Clay $10,000 | (Slovakia) Pavol Červenák; 6–1, 6–3 | (France) Maxime Teixeira | (Finland) Timo Nieminen (Serbia) Ivan Bjelica | (Norway) Erling Tveit (Russia) Aleksandr Lobkov (Serbia) Saša Stojisavljević (Ukraine) Artem Smirnov |
| March 15 | Turkey F3 Futures; Antalya, Turkey; Clay $10,000 | (Bulgaria) Tihomir Grozdanov (Bulgaria) Ivaylo Traykov; 3–6, 6–4, [10–3] | (Australia) Colin Ebelthite (Australia) Jarryd Maher | (Finland) Timo Nieminen (Serbia) Ivan Bjelica | (Norway) Erling Tveit (Russia) Aleksandr Lobkov (Serbia) Saša Stojisavljević (Ukraine) Artem Smirnov |
| March 22 | China F2 Futures; Mengzi, China; Hard $15,000 | (China) Zhang Ze; 6–1, 6–4 | (Italy) Riccardo Ghedin | (France) Fabrice Martin (Chinese Taipei) Yang Tsung-hua | (Chinese Taipei) Lee Hsin-han (China) Li Zhe (Germany) Sebastian Rieschick (South Korea) Daniel Yoo |
| March 22 | China F2 Futures; Mengzi, China; Hard $15,000 | (Solomon Islands) Michael Leong (Germany) Sebastian Rieschick; 6–2, 7–5 | (Chinese Taipei) Lee Hsin-han (Chinese Taipei) Yang Tsung-hua | (France) Fabrice Martin (Chinese Taipei) Yang Tsung-hua | (Chinese Taipei) Lee Hsin-han (China) Li Zhe (Germany) Sebastian Rieschick (South Korea) Daniel Yoo |
| March 22 | Italy F2 Futures; Rome, Italy; Clay $15,000 | (Austria) Andreas Haider-Maurer; 6–3, 7–5 | (Tunisia) Malek Jaziri | (Italy) Daniele Giorgini (Italy) Antonio Comporto | (Italy) Gianluca Naso (Belgium) David Goffin (Italy) Matteo Marrai (Italy) Alberto Giraudo |
| March 22 | Italy F2 Futures; Rome, Italy; Clay $15,000 | (Italy) Francesco Aldi (Italy) Daniele Giorgini; 6–4, 6–2 | (Austria) Andreas Haider-Maurer (Austria) Bertram Steinberger | (Italy) Daniele Giorgini (Italy) Antonio Comporto | (Italy) Gianluca Naso (Belgium) David Goffin (Italy) Matteo Marrai (Italy) Alberto Giraudo |
| March 22 | Kazakhstan F2 Futures; Almaty, Kazakhstan; Hard (indoor) $15,000 | (Russia) Andrey Kuznetsov; 6–3, 7–6^{(7–1)} | (Austria) Alexander Peya | (Russia) Evgeny Donskoy (Russia) Alexander Kudryavtsev | (Russia) Mikhail Ledovskikh (Russia) Ivan Belyaev (Kazakhstan) Alexey Kedryuk (Slovakia) Marek Semjan |
| March 22 | Kazakhstan F2 Futures; Almaty, Kazakhstan; Hard (indoor) $15,000 | (Russia) Evgeny Kirillov (Russia) Alexander Kudryavtsev; 7–5, 6–4 | (Kazakhstan) Alexey Kedryuk (Ukraine) Denys Molchanov | (Russia) Evgeny Donskoy (Russia) Alexander Kudryavtsev | (Russia) Mikhail Ledovskikh (Russia) Ivan Belyaev (Kazakhstan) Alexey Kedryuk (Slovakia) Marek Semjan |
| March 22 | Croatia F2 Futures; Rovinj, Croatia; Clay $10,000 | (Hungary) Attila Balázs; 6–4, 6–4 | (Italy) Matteo Viola | (Germany) Cedrik-Marcel Stebe (United States) Andrea Collarini | (Ecuador) Iván Endara (Czech Republic) Jiří Školoudík (Chile) Hans Podlipnik Castillo (Serbia) David Savić |
| March 22 | Croatia F2 Futures; Rovinj, Croatia; Clay $10,000 | (Croatia) Marin Draganja (Germany) Cedrik-Marcel Stebe; 1–6, 6–2, [10–3] | (Croatia) Toni Androić (Croatia) Nikola Mektić | (Germany) Cedrik-Marcel Stebe (United States) Andrea Collarini | (Ecuador) Iván Endara (Czech Republic) Jiří Školoudík (Chile) Hans Podlipnik Castillo (Serbia) David Savić |
| March 22 | India F2 Futures; Chandigarh, India; Hard $10,000 | (India) Karan Rastogi; 4–6, 6–4, 6–4 | (France) Romain Sichez | (India) Ranjeet Virali-Murugesan (Slovakia) Adrian Sikora | (India) Vivek Shokeen (Sweden) Patrik Brydolf (United States) Ruben Gonzales (United States) Nathan Thompson |
| March 22 | India F2 Futures; Chandigarh, India; Hard $10,000 | (United States) Ruben Gonzales (United States) Nathan Thompson; 7–5, 7–6^{(7–4)} | (India) Vijayant Malik (India) Ashutosh Singh | (India) Ranjeet Virali-Murugesan (Slovakia) Adrian Sikora | (India) Vivek Shokeen (Sweden) Patrik Brydolf (United States) Ruben Gonzales (United States) Nathan Thompson |
| March 22 | Japan F2 Futures; Tokyo, Japan; Hard $10,000 | (Japan) Go Soeda; 6–1, 6–3 | (Japan) Hiroki Kondo | (Japan) Kento Takeuchi (Japan) Yuichi Ito | (Chinese Taipei) Yi Chu-huan (Japan) Hiroki Moriya (Japan) Yuya Tomisaki (Japan) Kosuke Naruse |
| March 22 | Japan F2 Futures; Tokyo, Japan; Hard $10,000 | (Japan) Tasuku Iwami (Japan) Hiroki Kondo; 3–6, 6–1, [10–8] | (New Zealand) Mikal Statham (United States) Maciek Sykut | (Japan) Kento Takeuchi (Japan) Yuichi Ito | (Chinese Taipei) Yi Chu-huan (Japan) Hiroki Moriya (Japan) Yuya Tomisaki (Japan) Kosuke Naruse |
| March 22 | Spain F1 Futures; Zaragoza, Spain; Clay (indoor) $10,000 | (Spain) Daniel Muñoz de la Nava; 6–3, 6–4 | (Spain) Pablo Carreño Busta | (France) Augustin Gensse (Spain) José Checa Calvo | (Spain) Marc Fornell (Spain) Ignacio Coll Riudavets (Spain) Pablo Santos (Spain) Sergio Gutiérrez Ferrol |
| March 22 | Spain F1 Futures; Zaragoza, Spain; Clay (indoor) $10,000 | (Spain) Jordi Marse-Vidri (Spain) Oscar Sabate-Bretos; Walkover | (Spain) Pablo Carreño Busta (Spain) Pablo Santos | (France) Augustin Gensse (Spain) José Checa Calvo | (Spain) Marc Fornell (Spain) Ignacio Coll Riudavets (Spain) Pablo Santos (Spain) Sergio Gutiérrez Ferrol |
| March 22 | Switzerland F3 Futures; Vaduz, Liechtenstein (Switzerland); Carpet (indoor) $10,000 | (Croatia) Ante Pavić; 6–3, 7–6^{(7–3)} | (Latvia) Andis Juška | (Germany) Dennis Blömke (Germany) Marcel Zimmermann | (Italy) Walter Trusendi (Poland) Grzegorz Panfil (Estonia) Jürgen Zopp (Portugal) Gastão Elias |
| March 22 | Switzerland F3 Futures; Vaduz, Liechtenstein (Switzerland); Carpet (indoor) $10,000 | (France) Olivier Charroin (Latvia) Andis Juška; 6–2, 6–3 | (Germany) Dennis Blömke (Germany) Marc Meigel | (Germany) Dennis Blömke (Germany) Marcel Zimmermann | (Italy) Walter Trusendi (Poland) Grzegorz Panfil (Estonia) Jürgen Zopp (Portugal) Gastão Elias |
| March 22 | Turkey F4 Futures; Antalya, Turkey; Clay $10,000 | (Austria) Marco Mirnegg; 6–1, 6–4 | (Serbia) Ivan Bjelica | (Poland) Jerzy Janowicz (Norway) Erling Tveit | (Australia) Colin Ebelthite (Russia) Aleksandr Lobkov (Serbia) Dušan Lajović (France) Gianni Mina |
| March 22 | Turkey F4 Futures; Antalya, Turkey; Clay $10,000 | (Czech Republic) Karel Tříska (Czech Republic) Radim Urbanek; 6–2, 6–1 | (Belgium) Bart Govaerts (Poland) Andriej Kapaś | (Poland) Jerzy Janowicz (Norway) Erling Tveit | (Australia) Colin Ebelthite (Russia) Aleksandr Lobkov (Serbia) Dušan Lajović (France) Gianni Mina |
| March 29 | Italy F3 Futures; Foggia, Italy; Clay $15,000 | (Italy) Alessio di Mauro; 6–2, 7–6^{(7–2)} | (Austria) Andreas Haider-Maurer | (Germany) Bastian Knittel (Romania) Petru-Alexandru Luncanu | (Denmark) Frederik Nielsen (Italy) Antonio Comporto (Tunisia) Malek Jaziri (Italy) Simone Vagnozzi |
| March 29 | Italy F3 Futures; Foggia, Italy; Clay $15,000 | (Italy) Alessio di Mauro (Italy) Simone Vagnozzi; 6–4, 6–0 | (Argentina) Diego Álvarez (Argentina) Agustín Picco | (Germany) Bastian Knittel (Romania) Petru-Alexandru Luncanu | (Denmark) Frederik Nielsen (Italy) Antonio Comporto (Tunisia) Malek Jaziri (Italy) Simone Vagnozzi |
| March 29 | USA F8 Futures; Mobile, United States; Hard $15,000 | (Slovakia) Ivo Klec; 6–1, 6–4 | (United States) Greg Ouellette | (Australia) Kaden Hensel (Portugal) Leonardo Tavares | (South Africa) Fritz Wolmarans (France) Jean-Noël Insausti (Montenegro) Daniel Danilović (Dominican Republic) Víctor Estrella |
| March 29 | USA F8 Futures; Mobile, United States; Hard $15,000 | (Australia) Brydan Klein (Australia) John Millman; 4–6, 6–4, [10–6] | (Australia) Kaden Hensel (New Zealand) José Statham | (Australia) Kaden Hensel (Portugal) Leonardo Tavares | (South Africa) Fritz Wolmarans (France) Jean-Noël Insausti (Montenegro) Daniel Danilović (Dominican Republic) Víctor Estrella |
| March 29 | Croatia F3 Futures; Rovinj, Croatia; Clay $10,000 | (Austria) Herbert Wiltschnig; 6–4, 7–5 | (Spain) Javier Martí | (Croatia) Nikola Mektić (Italy) Matteo Viola | (Chile) Hans Podlipnik Castillo (Chile) Cristóbal Saavedra Corvalán (Serbia) David Savić (Austria) Christian Magg |
| March 29 | Croatia F3 Futures; Rovinj, Croatia; Clay $10,000 | (Croatia) Marin Draganja (Germany) Cedrik-Marcel Stebe; 6–4, 3–6, [10–7] | (Spain) Óscar Burrieza (Spain) Javier Martí | (Croatia) Nikola Mektić (Italy) Matteo Viola | (Chile) Hans Podlipnik Castillo (Chile) Cristóbal Saavedra Corvalán (Serbia) David Savić (Austria) Christian Magg |
| March 29 | India F3 Futures; Vijayawada, India; Hard $10,000 | (India) Rupesh Roy; 1–6, 6–4, 7–5 | (India) Vishnu Vardhan | (India) Ranjeet Virali-Murugesan (India) Rohan Gajjar | (India) Yuki Bhambri (India) Vinayak Sharma Kaza (Czech Republic) Roman Jebavý (United States) Nathan Thompson |
| March 29 | India F3 Futures; Vijayawada, India; Hard $10,000 | (India) Divij Sharan (India) Vishnu Vardhan; 2–6, 6–3, [10–3] | (India) Sriram Balaji (India) Vignesh Peranamallur | (India) Ranjeet Virali-Murugesan (India) Rohan Gajjar | (India) Yuki Bhambri (India) Vinayak Sharma Kaza (Czech Republic) Roman Jebavý (United States) Nathan Thompson |
| March 29 | Japan F3 Futures; Kofu, Japan; Hard $10,000 | (Japan) Go Soeda; 6–3, 6–4 | (Chinese Taipei) Yi Chu-huan | (Japan) Shuichi Sekiguchi (Japan) Yuichi Ito | (Japan) Tatsuma Ito (New Zealand) Mikal Statham (Japan) Kishi Watanabe (Japan) Takuto Niki |
| March 29 | Japan F3 Futures; Kofu, Japan; Hard $10,000 | (Japan) Tasuku Iwami (Japan) Hiroki Kondo; 6–2, 6–3 | (New Zealand) Mikal Statham (United States) Maciek Sykut | (Japan) Shuichi Sekiguchi (Japan) Yuichi Ito | (Japan) Tatsuma Ito (New Zealand) Mikal Statham (Japan) Kishi Watanabe (Japan) Takuto Niki |
| March 29 | Turkey F5 Futures; Antalya, Turkey; Clay $10,000 | (France) Gianni Mina; 6–3, 6–1 | (Spain) Gerard Granollers | (Hungary) Ádám Kellner (Serbia) Ivan Bjelica | (Switzerland) Yann Marti (Finland) Timo Nieminen (Norway) Stian Boretti (Bulgaria) Ivaylo Traykov |
| March 29 | Turkey F5 Futures; Antalya, Turkey; Clay $10,000 | (Spain) Ignacio Coll Riudavets (Spain) Gerard Granollers; 6–2, 5–7, [10–7] | (Serbia) Ivan Bjelica (Serbia) Miljan Zekić | (Hungary) Ádám Kellner (Serbia) Ivan Bjelica | (Switzerland) Yann Marti (Finland) Timo Nieminen (Norway) Stian Boretti (Bulgaria) Ivaylo Traykov |

== See also ==
- 2010 ITF Men's Circuit
- 2010 ITF Men's Circuit (April–June)
- 2010 ITF Men's Circuit (July–September)
- 2010 ITF Men's Circuit (October–December)
- 2010 ATP World Tour
- 2010 ATP Challenger Tour
