= 2010 Mordovia Cup – Doubles =

Doubles
- 2010 Mordovia Cup

Final
- Champions: (Russia) Ilya Belyaev (Russia) Michail Elgin
- Runners-up: (Ukraine) Denys Molchanov (Ukraine) Artem Smirnov
- Score: 3–6, 7–6(6), [11–9]

Events
Singles	Doubles
- Mordovia Cup

Michail Elgin and Evgeny Kirillov were the defending champions, but they chose to not compete together.
Elgin partnered up with Ilya Belyaev and Kirillov teamed up with Andrey Kuznetsov. They met in the semifinal and Elgin/Belyaev won 6–3, 4–6, [10–1].
This pair defeated Denys Molchanov and Artem Smirnov in the final 3–6, 7–6(6), [11–9].

== Seeds ==
1. (Kazakhstan) Alexey Kedryuk / (Russia) Denis Matsukevich (first round)
2. (Ukraine) Denys Molchanov / (Ukraine) Artem Smirnov (final)
3. (Russia) Andrey Kumantsov / (Serbia) David Savic (quarterfinals)
4. (Uzbekistan) Murad Inoyatov / (Russia) Artem Sitak (quarterfinals)

== Draw ==
Key

- Q = Qualifier
- WC = Wild card
- LL = Lucky loser
- Alt = Alternate
- ITF = ITF entry
- PR = Protected ranking
- SR = Special ranking
- SE = Special exempt
- JE = Junior exempt
- JR = Junior Accelerator Programme entrant
- CO = College Accelerator Programme entrant
- NG = Next Gen Accelerator Program entrant
- w/o = Walkover
- r = Retired
- d = Defaulted

=== Draw ===
First round
1	(Kazakhstan) A Kedryuk (Russia) D Matsukevich	6^{5}	5
(Russia) I Belyaev (Russia) M Elgin	7	7
(Romania) C Gârd (Romania) P-A Luncanu	2	6	[7]
(Spain) I Cervantes-Huegun (Spain) P Santos	6	3	[10]
4	(Uzbekistan) M Inoyatov (Russia) A Sitak	6	6
WC	(Russia) A Manegin (Russia) V Rudnev	3	2
(Russia) S Krotiouk (Russia) A Lobkov	6^{7}	1
(Russia) E Kirillov (Russia) A Kuznetsov	7	6
WC	(Russia) I Rud (Moldova) R Tudoreanu	3	3
(Russia) E Donskoy (Russia) K Kravchuk	6	6
(Republic of Ireland) C Niland (Ukraine) I Sergeyev	2	4
3	(Russia) A Kumantsov (Serbia) D Savić	6	6
(Kazakhstan) M Kukushkin (Russia) V Reshetnikov	3	7	[10]
(Spain) A Boje-Ordóñez (Spain) G Olaso	6	5	[8]
WC	(Belarus) A Bury (Belarus) K Harbatsiuk	6	3	[6]
2	(Ukraine) D Molchanov (Ukraine) A Smirnov	3	6	[10]

Quarterfinals
(Russia) I Belyaev (Russia) M Elgin
(Spain) I Cervantes-Huegun (Spain) P Santos	w/o
4	(Uzbekistan) M Inoyatov (Russia) A Sitak	4	3
(Russia) E Kirillov (Russia) A Kuznetsov	6	6
(Russia) E Donskoy (Russia) K Kravchuk	6	6
3	(Russia) A Kumantsov (Serbia) D Savić	4	4
(Kazakhstan) M Kukushkin (Russia) V Reshetnikov	3	1
2	(Ukraine) D Molchanov (Ukraine) A Smirnov	6	6

Semifinals
(Russia) I Belyaev (Russia) M Elgin	6	4	[10]
(Russia) E Kirillov (Russia) A Kuznetsov	3	6	[1]
(Russia) E Donskoy (Russia) K Kravchuk	4	4
2	(Ukraine) D Molchanov (Ukraine) A Smirnov	6	6

Finals
(Russia) I Belyaev (Russia) M Elgin	3	7	[11]
2	(Ukraine) D Molchanov (Ukraine) A Smirnov	6	6^{6}	[9]
