= 2009 Mordovia Cup – Singles =

Singles
- 2009 Mordovia Cup

Final
- Champion: (Spain) Iñigo Cervantes-Huegun
- Runner-up: (France) Jonathan Dasnières de Veigy
- Score: 7–5, 6–4

Events
Singles	Doubles
- Mordovia Cup

Michail Elgin was the defending champion, but he lost in the semifinal. He was eliminated by Iñigo Cervantes-Huegun.
Cervantes-Huegun defeated Jonathan Dasnières de Veigy 7–5, 6–4 in the final.

== Seeds ==
1. (Russia) Michail Elgin (semifinals)
2. (Kazakhstan) Mikhail Kukushkin (first round)
3. (Ukraine) Illya Marchenko (quarterfinals)
4. (Latvia) ~~Deniss Pavlovs~~ (withdrew)
5. (Republic of Ireland) Conor Niland (quarterfinals)
6. (France) Jonathan Dasnières de Veigy (final)
7. (Spain) Iñigo Cervantes-Huegun (champion)
8. (Ukraine) Ivan Sergeyev (second round)

== Draw ==
Key

- Q = Qualifier
- WC = Wild card
- LL = Lucky loser
- Alt = Alternate
- ITF = ITF entry
- PR = Protected ranking
- SR = Special ranking
- SE = Special exempt
- JE = Junior exempt
- JR = Junior Accelerator Programme entrant
- CO = College Accelerator Programme entrant
- NG = Next Gen Accelerator Program entrant
- w/o = Walkover
- r = Retired
- d = Defaulted

=== Final four ===
Semifinals
1	(Russia) Michail Elgin	6^{4}	3
7	(Spain) Iñigo Cervantes-Huegun	7	6
6	(France) Jonathan Dasnières de Veigy	7	6
(Spain) Guillermo Olaso	6^{5}	4

Final
7	(Spain) Iñigo Cervantes-Huegun	7	6
6	(France) Jonathan Dasnières de Veigy	5	4

=== Top half ===
First round
1	(Russia) M Elgin	6	6
Q	(Ukraine) A Smirnov	2	3
Q	(Russia) V Reshetnikov	4	7	6
WC	(Georgia (country)) N Basilashvili	6	6^{6}	3
Q	(Ukraine) D Molchanov	6	6
Q	(Russia) D Matsukevich	1	1
WC	(Russia) V Dubinsky	4	1
8	(Ukraine) I Sergeyev	6	6
3	(Ukraine) I Marchenko	3	6	6
(France) G Rufin	6	4	3
(Netherlands) B Westerhof	7	6
(Kazakhstan) A Kedryuk	5	2
(Australia) G Jones	7	6
(Poland) G Panfil	6^{2}	4
(Russia) I Belyaev	6	4	2
7	(Spain) I Cervantes-Huegun	4	6	6

Second round
1	(Russia) M Elgin	6	6
Q	(Russia) V Reshetnikov	1	3
Q	(Ukraine) D Molchanov	4	6	7
8	(Ukraine) I Sergeyev	6	3	6^{4}
3	(Ukraine) I Marchenko	6	7
(Netherlands) B Westerhof	2	6^{0}
(Australia) G Jones	4	4
7	(Spain) I Cervantes-Huegun	6	6

Quarterfinals
1	(Russia) M Elgin	7	6
Q	(Ukraine) D Molchanov	5	4
3	(Ukraine) I Marchenko	4	6	2
7	(Spain) I Cervantes-Huegun	6	3	6

Semifinals
1	(Russia) M Elgin	6^{4}	3
7	(Spain) I Cervantes-Huegun	7	6

=== Bottom half ===
First round
6	(France) J Dasnières de Veigy	4	6	6
(Slovakia) I Klec	6	4	3
(Russia) V Rudnev	6	6
(Russia) E Kirillov	3	2
(Japan) J Mitsuhashi	4	1
Q	(Russia) M Ledovskikh	6	6
(Netherlands) M Middelkoop	6	6
LL	(Russia) A Sitak	4	2
5	(Republic of Ireland) C Niland	6	6
(Moldova) A Gorban	3	3
WC	(Russia) A Manegin	7	6
(Russia) P Chekhov	6^{2}	3
(Tunisia) M Jaziri	4	6	4
(Spain) G Olaso	6	0	6
WC	(Russia) E Donskoy	6	4	6
2	(Kazakhstan) M Kukushkin	4	6	3

Second round
6	(France) J Dasnières de Veigy	7	6
(Russia) V Rudnev	6^{5}	4
Q	(Russia) M Ledovskikh	6	6
(Netherlands) M Middelkoop	4	3
5	(Republic of Ireland) C Niland	6	6
WC	(Russia) A Manegin	1	2
(Spain) G Olaso	6	7
WC	(Russia) E Donskoy	3	6^{1}

Quarterfinals
6	(France) J Dasnières de Veigy	6	3	6
Q	(Russia) M Ledovskikh	3	6	3
5	(Republic of Ireland) C Niland	4	1
(Spain) G Olaso	6	6

Semifinals
6	(France) J Dasnières de Veigy	7	6
(Spain) G Olaso	6^{5}	4
