= 2010 Mordovia Cup – Singles =

Singles
- 2010 Mordovia Cup

Final
- Champion: (Ukraine) Ivan Sergeyev
- Runner-up: (Slovakia) Marek Semjan
- Score: 7–6(2), 6–1

Events
Singles	Doubles
- Mordovia Cup

Iñigo Cervantes-Huegun was the defender of title, but he was eliminated after retired in first round match against Andrey Kuznetsov.
Ivan Sergeyev defeated Marek Semjan 7–6(2), 6–1 in the final.

== Seeds ==
1. (Kazakhstan) Mikhail Kukushkin (quarterfinals)
2. (Republic of Ireland) Conor Niland (quarterfinals)
3. (Ukraine) Ivan Sergeyev (champion)
4. (Russia) Konstantin Kravchuk (second round)
5. (Russia) Alexandre Kudryavtsev (second round)
6. (Russia) Evgeny Kirillov (first round)
7. (Spain) Iñigo Cervantes-Huegun (first round, retired due to left thigh injury)
8. (France) Laurent Recouderc (quarterfinals)

== Draw ==
Key

- Q = Qualifier
- WC = Wild card
- LL = Lucky loser
- Alt = Alternate
- ITF = ITF entry
- PR = Protected ranking
- SR = Special ranking
- SE = Special exempt
- JE = Junior exempt
- JR = Junior Accelerator Programme entrant
- CO = College Accelerator Programme entrant
- NG = Next Gen Accelerator Program entrant
- w/o = Walkover
- r = Retired
- d = Defaulted

=== Finals ===
Semifinals
(Slovakia) Marek Semjan	3	6	6
(Russia) Evgeny Donskoy	6	2	3
3	(Ukraine) Ivan Sergeyev	5	6	6
(Russia) Andrey Kuznetsov	7	4	4

Final
(Slovakia) Marek Semjan	6^{2}	1
3	(Ukraine) Ivan Sergeyev	7	6

=== Top half ===
First round
1	(Kazakhstan) M Kukushkin	6	7
(Russia) M Ledovskikh	2	5
(Romania) P-A Luncanu	6	6
Q	(Uzbekistan) M Inoyatov	0	3
(Russia) I Belyaev	2	2
Q	(Russia) D Matsukevich	6	6
(Slovakia) M Semjan	6	6
6	(Russia) E Kirillov	1	4
4	(Russia) K Kravchuk	1	6	7
(Romania) C Gârd	6	3	6^{6}
(Spain) G Olaso	6	6
Q	(Serbia) D Savić	1	0
(Russia) E Donskoy	6^{4}	6	7
(Russia) V Rudnev	7	2	5
(Russia) M Elgin	2	4
5	(Russia) A Kudryavtsev	6	6

Second round
1	(Kazakhstan) M Kukushkin	6	3	6
(Romania) P-A Luncanu	2	6	2
Q	(Russia) D Matsukevich	2	4
(Slovakia) M Semjan	6	6
4	(Russia) K Kravchuk	7	3	5
(Spain) G Olaso	5	6	7
(Russia) E Donskoy	6	3	6
5	(Russia) A Kudryavtsev	3	6	3

Quarterfinals
1	(Kazakhstan) M Kukushkin	6^{2}	2
(Slovakia) M Semjan	7	6
(Spain) G Olaso	4	2
(Russia) E Donskoy	6	6

Semifinals
(Slovakia) M Semjan	3	6	6
(Russia) E Donskoy	6	2	3

=== Bottom half ===
First round
8	(France) L Recouderc	6	6
(Russia) A Kumantsov	2	3
(Spain) P Santos	7	6
LL	(Russia) A Lobkov	6^{6}	0
LL	(Russia) S Krotiouk	6^{7}	5
WC	(Russia) A Manegin	7	7
(Russia) A Sitak	3	6	3
3	(Ukraine) I Sergeyev	6	1	6
7	(Spain) I Cervantes-Huegun	0	r
(Russia) A Kuznetsov	5
(France) L Walter	2	7	7
Q	(Ukraine) A Smirnov	6	5	6^{7}
(Spain) A Boje-Ordóñez	6	6
LL	(Moldova) A Gorban	1	0
(Ukraine) D Molchanov	3	4
2	(Republic of Ireland) C Niland	6	6

Second round
8	(France) L Recouderc	2	6	6
(Spain) P Santos	6	3	2
WC	(Russia) A Manegin	0	1
3	(Ukraine) I Sergeyev	6	6
(Russia) A Kuznetsov	7	6
(France) L Walter	5	0
(Spain) A Boje-Ordóñez	3	2
2	(Republic of Ireland) C Niland	6	6

Quarterfinals
8	(France) L Recouderc	2	1
3	(Ukraine) I Sergeyev	6	6
(Russia) A Kuznetsov	6	7
2	(Republic of Ireland) C Niland	4	6^{3}

Semifinals
3	(Ukraine) I Sergeyev	5	6	6
(Russia) A Kuznetsov	7	4	4
