= 2009 Mordovia Cup – Doubles =

Doubles
- 2009 Mordovia Cup

Final
- Champions: (Russia) Michail Elgin (Russia) Evgeny Kirillov
- Runners-up: (Kazakhstan) Alexey Kedryuk (Russia) Denis Matsukevich
- Score: 6–1, 6–2

Events
Singles	Doubles
- Mordovia Cup

Denis Istomin and Evgeny Kirillov were the defending champions, but only Kirillov started this year.
He partnered up with Michail Elgin and this pair won the tournament, after defeating Alexey Kedryuk and Denis Matsukevich 6–1, 6–2 in the final.

== Seeds ==
1. (Russia) Michail Elgin / (Russia) Evgeny Kirillov (champions)
2. (Kazakhstan) Alexey Kedryuk / (Russia) Denis Matsukevich (final)
3. (Latvia) ~~Andis Juška~~ / (Latvia) ~~Deniss Pavlovs~~ (withdrew due to Pavlovs' back pain)
4. (Australia) Kaden Hensel / (Australia) Adam Hubble (quarterfinals)

== Draw ==
Key

- Q = Qualifier
- WC = Wild card
- LL = Lucky loser
- Alt = Alternate
- ITF = ITF entry
- PR = Protected ranking
- SR = Special ranking
- SE = Special exempt
- JE = Junior exempt
- JR = Junior Accelerator Programme entrant
- CO = College Accelerator Programme entrant
- NG = Next Gen Accelerator Program entrant
- w/o = Walkover
- r = Retired
- d = Defaulted

=== Quarterfinals, semifinals, final ===
Quarterfinals
1	(Russia) M Elgin (Russia) E Kirillov	6	7
(Kazakhstan) M Kukushkin (Russia) V Reshetnikov	2	5
(Moldova) A Gorban (Ukraine) I Sergeyev	2	5
(Netherlands) A van der Duim (Netherlands) B Westerhof	6	7
(Ukraine) D Molchanov (Russia) A Sitak	6	6
4	(Australia) K Hensel (Australia) A Hubble	4	4
(Russia) I Belyaev (Russia) E Donskoy	6^{5}	1
2	(Kazakhstan) A Kedryuk (Russia) D Matsukevich	7	6

Semifinals
1	(Russia) M Elgin (Russia) E Kirillov	6	6
(Netherlands) A van der Duim (Netherlands) B Westerhof	1	2
(Ukraine) D Molchanov (Russia) A Sitak	5	6^{6}
(Kazakhstan) A Kedryuk (Russia) D Matsukevich	7	7

Finals
1	(Russia) M Elgin (Russia) E Kirillov	6	6
2	(Kazakhstan) A Kedryuk (Russia) D Matsukevich	2	1
