= 2010 Mordovia Cup =

- Date: July 26 – August 1
- Edition: 8th
- Location: Saransk, Russia

Champions

Singles
- (Ukraine) Ivan Sergeyev

Doubles
- (Russia) Ilya Belyaev / (Russia) Michail Elgin
- Mordovia Cup

The 2010 Mordovia Cup was a professional tennis tournament played on outdoor red clay courts. It was the eighth edition of the tournament which was part of the 2010 ATP Challenger Tour. It took place in Saransk, Russia between 26 July and 1 August 2010.

== ATP entrants ==
=== Seeds ===
| Nationality | Player | Ranking* | Seeding |
|---|---|---|---|
| KAZ | Mikhail Kukushkin | 95 | 1 |
| IRL | Conor Niland | 162 | 2 |
| UKR | Ivan Sergeyev | 170 | 3 |
| RUS | Konstantin Kravchuk | 185 | 4 |
| RUS | Alexandre Kudryavtsev | 205 | 5 |
| RUS | Evgeny Kirillov | 209 | 6 |
| ESP | Iñigo Cervantes-Huegun | 215 | 7 |
| FRA | Laurent Recouderc | 222 | 8 |

- Rankings are as of July 19, 2010.

=== Other entrants ===
The following players received wildcards into the singles main draw:

- (Russia) Anton Manegin

The following players received entry from the qualifying draw:

- (Moldova) Andrei Gorban (as a Lucky Loser)
- (Uzbekistan) Murad Inoyatov
- (Russia) Sergei Krotiouk (as a Lucky Loser)
- (Russia) Alexander Lobkov (as a Lucky Loser)
- (Russia) Denis Matsukevich
- (Serbia) David Savić
- (Ukraine) Artem Smirnov

== Champions ==
=== Singles ===
(Ukraine) Ivan Sergeyev def. (Slovakia) Marek Semjan, 7–6(2), 6–1

=== Doubles ===
(Russia) Ilya Belyaev / (Russia) Michail Elgin def. (Ukraine) Denys Molchanov / (Ukraine) Artem Smirnov, 3–6, 7–6(6), [11–9]
