= 2009 Mordovia Cup =

- Date: July 27 – August 2
- Edition: 7th
- Location: Saransk, Russia

Champions

Singles
- (Spain) Iñigo Cervantes-Huegun

Doubles
- (Russia) Michail Elgin / (Russia) Evgeny Kirillov
- Mordovia Cup

The 2009 Mordovia Cup was a professional tennis tournament played on outdoor red clay courts. It was the seventh edition of the tournament which was part of the 2009 ATP Challenger Tour. It took place in Saransk, Russia between 27 July and 2 August 2009.

== Singles entrants ==
=== Seeds ===
Nationality	Player	Ranking*	Seeding
RUS	Michail Elgin	132	1
KAZ	Mikhail Kukushkin	169	2
UKR	Illya Marchenko	236	3
LAT	~~Deniss Pavlovs~~	~~263~~	~~4~~
IRL	Conor Niland	277	5
FRA	Jonathan Dasnières de Veigy	290	6
ESP	Iñigo Cervantes-Huegun	296	7
UKR	Ivan Sergeyev	301	8

- Rankings are as of July 20, 2009.

=== Other entrants ===
The following players received wildcards into the singles main draw:

- (Georgia (country)) Nikoloz Basilashvili
- (Russia) Evgeny Donskoy
- (Russia) Vladislav Dubinsky
- (Russia) Anton Manegin

The following players received entry from the qualifying draw:

- (Russia) Mikhail Ledovskikh
- (Russia) Denis Matsukevich
- (Ukraine) Denys Molchanov
- (Russia) Vitali Reshetnikov
- (Russia) Artem Sitak (as a Lucky Loser)

== Champions ==
=== Singles ===
(Spain) Iñigo Cervantes-Huegun def. (France) Jonathan Dasnières de Veigy, 7–5, 6–4

=== Doubles ===
(Russia) Michail Elgin / (Russia) Evgeny Kirillov def. (Kazakhstan) Alexey Kedryuk / (Russia) Denis Matsukevich, 6–1, 6–2
