= 2011 Swedish Open – Men's singles qualifying =

This article displays the qualifying draw of the 2011 Swedish Open.

== Players ==
=== Seeds ===
1. (Argentina) Diego Junqueira (Qualified)
2. (Germany) Dustin Brown (Qualifying competition)
3. (Spain) Guillermo Olaso (Qualified)
4. (Croatia) Antonio Veić (Qualified)
5. (Spain) Javier Martí (Qualifying competition)
6. (Belgium) Yannick Mertens (Qualifying competition)
7. (Italy) Gianluca Naso (Qualifying competition)
8. (France) Jonathan Dasnières de Veigy (Qualified)

=== Qualifiers ===
1. (Argentina) Diego Junqueira
2. (France) Jonathan Dasnières de Veigy
3. (Spain) Guillermo Olaso
4. (Croatia) Antonio Veić

== Qualifying draw ==
=== First qualifier ===
First round
1	(Argentina) Diego Junqueira	6	6
(France) Nicolas Renavand	3	3
(Spain) Carlos Calderón-Rodríguez	6	3	3
(Moldova) Andrei Gorban	4	6	6
(Sweden) Patrik Rosenholm	6	6
(Czech Republic) František Čermák	0	1
(Sweden) Markus Eriksson	4	6^{3}
6	(Belgium) Yannick Mertens	6	7^{7}

Second round
1	(Argentina) Diego Junqueira	7	6
(Moldova) Andrei Gorban	5	1
(Sweden) Patrik Rosenholm	5	2
6	(Belgium) Yannick Mertens	7	6

Qualifying competition
1	(Argentina) Diego Junqueira	7^{7}	6
6	(Belgium) Yannick Mertens	6^{3}	1

=== Second qualifier ===
First round
2	(Germany) Dustin Brown	7^{9}	4	6
(France) Olivier Patience	6^{7}	6	3
(Sweden) Daniel Berta	5	3
(Spain) Gerard Granollers	7	6
(Kuwait) Ziad Sultan	3	4
(Sweden) Stefan Borg	6	6
WC	(Sweden) Robin Olin	3	0
8	(France) Jonathan Dasnières de Veigy	6	6

Second round
2	(Germany) Dustin Brown	7^{7}	3
(Spain) Gerard Granollers	6^{4}	0^{r}
(Sweden) Stefan Borg	1	2
8	(France) Jonathan Dasnières de Veigy	6	6

Qualifying competition
2	(Germany) Dustin Brown	1	6	4
8	(France) Jonathan Dasnières de Veigy	6	4	6

=== Third qualifier ===
First round
3	(Spain) Guillermo Olaso	6	1
(Croatia) Roko Karanušić	1	0^{r}
(Finland) Juho Paukku	4	4
(Sweden) Patrik Brydolf	6	6
(Finland) Harri Heliövaara	7	6
(Sweden) Carl Bergman	5	0
WC	(Sweden) Jacob Johansson	0	2
7	(Italy) Gianluca Naso	6	6

Second round
3	(Spain) Guillermo Olaso	6	7
(Sweden) Patrik Brydolf	2	5
(Finland) Harri Heliövaara	6	2	3
7	(Italy) Gianluca Naso	4	6	6

Qualifying competition
3	(Spain) Guillermo Olaso	3	6	6
7	(Italy) Gianluca Naso	6	3	4

=== Fourth qualifier ===
First round
4	(Croatia) Antonio Veić	6	6
WC	(Sweden) Jesper Brunström	1	2
(Sweden) Simon Norenius	6^{5}	3
WC	(Sweden) Fred Simonsson	7^{7}	6
(Sweden) Pablo Figueroa	6	6
(Sweden) Lucas Renard	2	2
(Sweden) Rickard Holmström	3	2
5	(Spain) Javier Martí	6	6

Second round
4	(Croatia) Antonio Veić	6	6
WC	(Sweden) Fred Simonsson	2	1
(Sweden) Pablo Figueroa	4	4
5	(Spain) Javier Martí	6	6

Qualifying competition
4	(Croatia) Antonio Veić	6	6
5	(Spain) Javier Martí	4	4
