= Rohan Gajjar =

Indian tennis player

- Country (sports): India
- Born: 8 May 1984 (age 42)
- Plays: Right-handed
- Prize money: $49,823

Singles
- Highest ranking: No. 429 (12 Jul 2010)

Doubles
- Career record: 0–1 (ATP Tour)
- Highest ranking: No. 258 (23 Feb 2009)

Rohan Gajjar (born 8 May 1984) is an Indian former professional tennis player.

Gajjar, who comes from Mumbai, played collegiate tennis for the University of Arkansas between 2003 and 2006, while studying for a degree in marketing. He was named in the 2005 All-SEC first-team.

Following his collegiate career he competed on the professional tour and in 2007 made an ATP Tour doubles main draw appearance in his home tournament, the Kingfisher Airlines Tennis Open. In 2010 he reached his career best singles ranking of 429 and broke through that year for his first ITF Futures singles title in Malaysia. At Futures level he was most successful in doubles, winning 13 titles over the course of his career.

== ITF Futures titles ==
=== Singles: (2) ===
No.	Date	Tournament	Surface	Opponent	Score
1.	Jun 2010	Malaysia F2, Kuala Lumpur	Hard	(Australia) Kaden Hensel	7–6^{(2)}, 6–1
2.	May 2011	India F6, Manipal	Hard	(India) Vijayant Malik	3–6, 6–3, 6–3

=== Doubles: (13) ===
No.	Date	Tournament	Surface	Partner	Opponents	Score
1.	Jul 2007	Iran F1, Tehran	Clay	(India) Aditya Madkekar	(Belarus) Sergey Betov (Kazakhstan) Syrym Abdukhalikov	6–7^{(2)}, 7–6^{(2)}, 5–7
2.	Mar 2008	India F3, Mumbai	Hard	(India) Purav Raja	(India) Harsh Mankad (India) Ranjeet Virali-Murugesan	6–3, 6–1
3.	Oct 2008	Nigeria F3, Lagos	Hard	(India) Divij Sharan	(Russia) Pavel Chekhov (Belarus) Pavel Katliarov	7–6^{(6)}, 6–7^{(2)}, [10–7]
4.	Nov 2008	India F8, Mumbai	Hard	(India) Purav Raja	(Serbia) David Savić (United States) Nathan Thompson	6–2, 7–6^{(4)}
5.	Sep 2009	India F9, New Delhi	Hard	(United Kingdom) Chris Eaton	(India) Ashutosh Singh (India) Vishnu Vardhan	7–6^{(6)}, 7–6^{(3)}
6.	Oct 2009	India F10, Kolkata	Hard	(India) Purav Raja	(India) Divij Sharan (India) Vishnu Vardhan	4–6, 5–7
7.	May 2011	India F6, Manipal	Hard	(Russia) Vitali Reshetnikov	(India) Vijayant Malik (India) Vivek Shokeen	6–1, 6–2
8.	Jun 2011	India F7, Delhi	Hard	(India) Divij Sharan	(Japan) Takuto Niki (Russia) Vitali Reshetnikov	6–2, 7–6^{(7)}
9.	Nov 2011	India F10, Pune	Hard	(Germany) Alexander Satschko	(India) Vishnu Vardhan (India) Karan Rastogi	6–4, 6–7^{(1)}, [8–10]
10.	Feb 2012	China F3, Mengzi	Hard	(India) Karan Rastogi	(China) Gao Peng (Japan) Hiroki Kondo	6–2, 6–4
11.	Feb 2012	India F1, Chandigarh	Hard	(India) Saketh Myneni	(India) Vijay Kannan (India) Arun-Prakash Rajagopalan	7–5, 6–3
12.	Mar 2012	India F3, Bhimavaram	Hard	(India) Saketh Myneni	(India) Vijay Sundar Prashanth (India) Arun-Prakash Rajagopalan	7–5, 6–3
13.	Apr 2012	Vietnam F1, Ho Chi Minh City	Hard	(India) Sriram Balaji	(Australia) Dane Propoggia (New Zealand) Jose Statham	6–3, 6–4
