= Bukhara Challenger =

Defunct tennis tournament
- Location: Bukhara, Uzbekistan
- Venue: Sport Complex Dilkusho
- Category: ATP Challenger Series
- Surface: Hard / Outdoors
- Draw: 32S/32Q/16D
- Prize money: $35,000

The Bukhara Challenger was a tennis tournament held in Bukhara, Uzbekistan from 2000 until 2008. The event was part of the Challenger Series and is played on outdoor hardcourts.

== Past finals ==
=== Singles ===
| Year | Champion | Runner-up | Score |
|---|---|---|---|
| 2008 | (Uzbekistan) Denis Istomin | (Ukraine) Illya Marchenko | 4–6, 6–2, 6–4 |
| 2007 | (Uzbekistan) Denis Istomin | (Israel) Amir Weintraub | 3–6, 6–1, 6–4 |
| 2006 | (Serbia and Montenegro) Janko Tipsarević | (India) Rohan Bopanna | 6–2, 6–4 |
| 2005 | (Uzbekistan) Denis Istomin | (Serbia and Montenegro) Ilija Bozoljac | 6–4, 6–7, 6–5, RET. |
| 2004 | (Slovakia) Michal Mertiňák | (Russia) Teymuraz Gabashvili | 3–6, 6–4, 6–3 |
| 2003 | (Germany) Marc-Kevin Goellner | (Cyprus) Marcos Baghdatis | 7–5, 6–7, 7–6 |
| 2002 | (Netherlands) John Van Lottum | (Greece) Vasilis Mazarakis | 7–6, 6–1 |
| 2001 | (Netherlands) John Van Lottum | (Uzbekistan) Oleg Ogorodov | 6–1, 6–1 |
| 2000 | (Israel) Noam Behr | (Belarus) Alexander Shvets | 4–6, 7–6, 6–0 |

=== Doubles ===
| Year | Champion | Runner-up | Score |
|---|---|---|---|
| 2008 | (Russia) Pavel Chekhov (Russia) Mikhail Elgin | (Poland) Łukasz Kubot (Austria) Oliver Marach | 7–6, 6–1 |
| 2007 | (Russia) Evgeny Kirillov (Russia) Alexandre Kudryavtsev | (Russia) Danila Arsenov (Uzbekistan) Vaja Uzakov | 6–3, 6–1 |
| 2006 | (France) Nicolas Renavand (France) Nicolas Tourte | (India) Rohan Bopanna (Pakistan) Aisam-ul-Haq Qureshi | 2–6, 6–3, [10–8] |
| 2005 | (Kazakhstan) Alexey Kedryuk (Ukraine) Orest Tereshchuk | (India) Rohan Bopanna (South Korea) Im Kyu-tae | 5–7, 6–4, 6–1 |
| 2004 | (Slovakia) Michal Mertiňák (Czech Republic) Pavel Šnobel | (Netherlands) Paul Logtens (Netherlands) Melle Van Gemerden | 6–4, 6–2 |
| 2003 | (Kazakhstan) Alexey Kedryuk (Uzbekistan) Vadim Kutsenko | (United States) Mirko Pehar (Netherlands Antilles) Jean-Julien Rojer | 6–4, 7–6 |
| 2002 | (Switzerland) Yves Allegro (Switzerland) Marco Chiudinelli | (Serbia and Montenegro) Janko Tipsarević (Germany) Jan Weinzierl | 6–3, 6–4 |
| 2001 | (Pakistan) Aisam-ul-Haq Qureshi (Netherlands) Rogier Wassen | (Kazakhstan) Alexey Kedryuk (Belarus) Alexander Shvets | 6–2, 6–4 |
| 2000 | (Uzbekistan) Vadim Kutsenko (Uzbekistan) Oleg Ogorodov | (Israel) Noam Behr (Pakistan) Aisam-ul-Haq Qureshi | 6–4, 7–6 |
