= Alexey Kedryuk =

Kazakhstani tennis player

- Country (sports): Kazakhstan
- Born: 8 August 1980 (age 45) Alma-Ata, Kazakhstan, Soviet Union
- Height: 1.93 m (6 ft 4 in)
- Turned pro: 1998
- Plays: Right-handed
- Prize money: US$153,687

Singles
- Career record: 17–9
- Career titles: 0
- Highest ranking: No. 261 (28 August 2006)

Grand Slam singles results
- US Open: Q1 (2006)

Doubles
- Career record: 6–11
- Career titles: 0
- Highest ranking: No. 123 (7 August 2006)

Alexey Kedryuk (born 8 August 1980) is a professional Kazakhstani tennis player.

Kedryuk reached his highest individual ranking on the ATP Tour on August 28, 2006, when he became World number 261.

Kedryuk has been a member of the Kazakhstani Davis Cup team since 1995, posting a 43–17 record in singles and a 23–17 record in doubles in 51 ties.

== ATP Challenger and ITF Futures finals ==
=== Singles: 20 (12–8) ===
Legend ATP Challenger (0–0) ITF Futures (12–8)	Finals by surface Hard (10–6) Clay (2–1) Grass (0–0) Carpet (0–0)

Result	W–L	Date	Tournament	Tier	Surface	Opponent	Score
Loss	0–1	Oct 2001	Uzbekistan F3, Karshi	Futures	Hard	(Russia) Alexander Shvets	3–6, 1–6
Loss	0–2	Oct 2001	Uzbekistan F4, Guliston	Futures	Hard	(Uzbekistan) Dmitriy Tomashevich	7–5, 5–7, 6–7^{(4–7)}
Loss	0–3	May 2004	Uzbekistan F3, Namangan	Futures	Hard	(United Kingdom) Jonathan Marray	3–6, 4–6
Win	1–3	Apr 2005	Uzbekistan F2, Guliston	Futures	Hard	(Russia) Kirill Ivanov-Smolenskii	6–3, 6–2
Win	2–3	Aug 2005	Russia F1, Sergiyev Posad	Futures	Clay	(Russia) Valery Rudnev	6–1, 6–4
Loss	2–4	Apr 2006	Uzbekistan F1, Karshi	Futures	Hard	(Uzbekistan) Denis Istomin	6–7^{(2–7)}, 4–6
Win	3–4	May 2006	Uzbekistan F3, Namangan	Futures	Hard	(France) Nicolas Tourte	6–4, 6–3
Win	4–4	Jul 2006	Turkey F3, Istanbul	Futures	Hard	(France) Alexandre Renard	6–4, 7–5
Win	5–4	Jul 2006	Turkey F4, Istanbul	Futures	Hard	(Israel) Dekel Valtzer	3–6, 6–1, 7–5
Loss	5–5	Nov 2006	Russia F1, Sergiyev Posad	Futures	Hard	(Russia) Konstantin Kravchuk	1–6, 7–5, 6–7^{(6–8)}
Loss	5–6	Mar 2008	India F2, Delhi	Futures	Hard	(Germany) Alexander Satschko	4–6, 4–6
Loss	5–7	May 2008	Korea F1, Gimcheon	Futures	Hard	(Japan) Tatsuma Ito	6–1, 3–6, 6–7^{(7–9)}
Loss	5–8	Sep 2008	India F6, Chennai	Futures	Clay	(Germany) Peter Gojowczyk	6–7^{(6–8)}, 1–6
Win	6–8	Mar 2009	Kazakhstan F1, Astana	Futures	Hard	(Slovakia) Martin Kližan	6–0, 7–6^{(7–4)}
Win	7–8	Apr 2009	Uzbekistan F2, Namangan	Futures	Hard	(Romania) Petru-Alexandru Luncanu	6–1, 6–2
Win	8–8	Sep 2009	Turkey F8, Istanbul	Futures	Hard	(Lithuania) Ričardas Berankis	6–2, 6–4
Win	9–8	Sep 2009	Kazakhstan F3, Shymkent	Futures	Clay	(Uzbekistan) Sarvar Ikramov	7–5, 6–3
Win	10–8	Oct 2009	Kazakhstan F4, Almaty	Futures	Hard	(Russia) Andrey Kumantsov	6–3, 7–6^{(7–4)}
Win	11–8	Apr 2012	Kazakhstan F1, Almaty	Futures	Hard	(Belarus) Egor Gerasimov	6–3, 1–6, 6–0
Win	12–8	Apr 2012	Kazakhstan F3, Shymkent	Futures	Hard	(Belarus) Sergey Betov	6–3, 7–6^{(8–6)}

=== Doubles: 69 (39–30) ===
Legend ATP Challenger (6–14) ITF Futures (33–16)	Finals by surface Hard (25–20) Clay (13–9) Grass (0–0) Carpet (1–1)

Result	W–L	Date	Tournament	Tier	Surface	Partner	Opponents	Score
Loss	0–1	Jun 1999	Poland F2, Zabrze	Futures	Clay	(Ukraine) Orest Tereshchuk	(Czech Republic) Petr Dezort (Czech Republic) Pavel Kudrnáč	4–6, 0–6
Win	1–1	Jul 2000	Georgia F1, Tbilisi	Futures	Clay	(Ukraine) Orest Tereshchuk	(Czech Republic) Igor Brukner (Slovakia) Martin Hromec	7–6^{(7–5)}, 6–4
Win	2–1	Aug 2000	Russia F1, Balashikha	Futures	Clay	(United States) Oren Motevassel	(Uzbekistan) Abdul-Hamid Makhkamov (Russia) Sergei Pozdnev	6–3, 6–2
Loss	2–2	Aug 2001	Russia F1, Balashikha	Futures	Clay	(Ukraine) Orest Tereshchuk	(Slovakia) Karol Beck (Slovakia) Igor Zelenay	6–0, 3–6, 4–6
Loss	2–3	Oct 2001	Bukhara, Uzbekistan	Challenger	Hard	(Belarus) Alexander Shvets	(Pakistan) Aisam Qureshi (Netherlands) Rogier Wassen	2–6, 4–6
Loss	2–4	Oct 2001	Uzbekistan F3, Karshi	Futures	Hard	(Russia) Alexander Shvets	(Russia) Kirill Ivanov-Smolenskii (Uzbekistan) Dmitriy Tomashevich	4–6, 7–5, 3–6
Win	3–4	Oct 2001	Uzbekistan F4, Guliston	Futures	Hard	(Uzbekistan) Dmitriy Tomashevich	(Uzbekistan) Anton Kokurin (Uzbekistan) Abdul-Hamid Makhkamov	walkover
Win	4–4	Jun 2002	Germany F8, Kassel	Futures	Clay	(Uzbekistan) Dmitriy Tomashevich	(Germany) Sebastian Jaeger (Germany) Florian Jeschonek	6–1, 4–6, 6–3
Loss	4–5	Aug 2002	Turkey F3, Istanbul	Futures	Hard	(Kazakhstan) Dias Doskarayev	(South Africa) Heinrich Heyl (Belgium) Jeroen Masson	6–7^{(3–7)}, 2–6
Loss	4–6	May 2003	Fergana, Uzbekistan	Challenger	Hard	(Ukraine) Orest Tereshchuk	(Pakistan) Aisam Qureshi (South Africa) Justin Bower	6–3, 6–7^{(0–7)}, 4–6
Win	5–6	Aug 2003	Bukhara, Uzbekistan	Challenger	Hard	(Uzbekistan) Vadim Kutsenko	(United States) Mirko Pehar (Netherlands) Jean-Julien Rojer	6–4, 7–6^{(7–4)}
Loss	5–7	Feb 2004	India F1A, New Delhi	Futures	Hard	(Ukraine) Orest Tereshchuk	(India) Mustafa Ghouse (India) Vishal Uppal	6–7^{(4–7)}, 4–6
Win	6–7	Apr 2004	Uzbekistan F2, Guliston	Futures	Hard	(Russia) Vadim Kutsenko	(Russia) Evgueni Smirnov (Russia) Dmitri Vlasov	7–6^{(7–5)}, 6–3
Loss	6–8	May 2004	Uzbekistan F3, Namangan	Futures	Hard	(Ukraine) Orest Tereshchuk	(United Kingdom) Daniel Kiernan (United Kingdom) Jonathan Marray	4–6, 3–6
Win	7–8	May 2004	Uzbekistan F4, Andijan	Futures	Hard	(Ukraine) Orest Tereshchuk	(India) Prakash Amritraj (Netherlands) Jean-Julien Rojer	7–5, 6–4
Win	8–8	Jun 2004	Tunisia F2, Tunis	Futures	Clay	(Tunisia) Walid Jallali	(France) Cyril Baudin (Ivory Coast) Valentin Sanon	6–1, 6–4
Win	9–8	Jun 2004	Tunisia F3, Tunis	Futures	Clay	(Tunisia) Walid Jallali	(Monaco) Benjamin Balleret (Monaco) Thomas Drouet	walkover
Win	10–8	Aug 2004	Saransk, Russia	Challenger	Clay	(Uzbekistan) Vadim Kutsenko	(Russia) Kirill Ivanov-Smolenskii (Russia) Andrei Stoliarov	6–1, 3–6, 6–4
Loss	10–9	Jan 2005	UAE F1, Dubai	Futures	Hard	(Russia) Dmitri Sitak	(Azerbaijan) Emin Agaev (Russia) Andrei Olhovskiy	7–6^{(7–3)}, 3–6, 1–6
Win	11–9	Jan 2005	Qatar F1, Doha	Futures	Hard	(Russia) Dmitri Sitak	(Czech Republic) David Novak (Czech Republic) Martin Vacek	6–0, ret.
Win	12–9	Feb 2005	Qatar F3, Doha	Futures	Hard	(Russia) Dmitri Sitak	(South Korea) Woong-Sun Jun (India) Jaco Mathew	6–4, 6–7^{(5–7)}, 6–1
Win	13–9	Apr 2005	Uzbekistan F2, Guliston	Futures	Hard	(India) Sunil-Kumar Sipaeya	(New Zealand) Artem Sitak (Russia) Dmitri Sitak	6–3, 1–6, 6–3
Win	14–9	Jun 2005	Turkey F3, Istanbul	Futures	Hard	(Ukraine) Orest Tereshchuk	(North Macedonia) Lazar Magdinchev (North Macedonia) Predrag Rusevski	walkover
Loss	14–10	Aug 2005	Russia F1, Sergiyev Posad	Futures	Clay	(Russia) Alexander Kudryavtsev	(Russia) Mikhail Elgin (Ukraine) Mikhail Filima	2–6, 4–6
Loss	14–11	Aug 2005	Samarkand, Uzbekistan	Challenger	Clay	(Ukraine) Orest Tereshchuk	(Croatia) Ivan Cerović (Serbia) Petar Popović	3–6, 0–6
Win	15–11	Aug 2005	Bukhara, Uzbekistan	Challenger	Hard	(Ukraine) Orest Tereshchuk	(India) Rohan Bopanna (South Korea) Im Kyu-tae	5–7, 6–4, 6–1
Loss	15–12	Jan 2006	Doha, Qatar	Challenger	Hard	(Ukraine) Orest Tereshchuk	(Poland) Łukasz Kubot (Austria) Oliver Marach	4–6, 1–6
Win	16–12	Apr 2006	Uzbekistan F2, Guliston	Futures	Hard	(Russia) Mikhail Elgin	(Russia) Konstantin Kravchuk (Russia) Alexander Kudryavtsev	5–7, 6–4, 6–4
Loss	16–13	May 2006	Fergana, Uzbekistan	Challenger	Hard	(Ukraine) Orest Tereshchuk	(Thailand) Sonchat Ratiwatana (Thailand) Sanchai Ratiwatana	7–6^{(9–7)}, 6–7^{(3–7)}, 12–14
Win	17–13	Jul 2006	Turkey F3, Istanbul	Futures	Hard	(Uzbekistan) Murad Inoyatov	(France) Julien Maes (France) Alexandre Renard	7–5, 6–4
Win	18–13	Jul 2006	Istanbul, Turkey	Challenger	Hard	(Ukraine) Orest Tereshchuk	(Netherlands) Jasper Smit (Netherlands) Martijn van Haasteren	1–6, 7–5, [10–8]
Loss	18–14	Jul 2006	Tolyatti, Russia	Challenger	Hard	(Ukraine) Orest Tereshchuk	(Austria) Alexander Peya (Italy) Uros Vico	4–6, 4–6
Win	19–14	Aug 2006	Saransk, Russia	Challenger	Clay	(Ukraine) Orest Tereshchuk	(Netherlands) Robin Haase (Israel) Dekel Valtzer	6–4, 5–7, [10–5]
Win	20–14	Dec 2006	India F3, Delhi	Futures	Hard	(India) Sunil-Kumar Sipaeya	(India) Rohan Bopanna (India) Mustafa Ghouse	6–3, 6–4
Loss	20–15	Dec 2006	India F4, Delhi	Futures	Hard	(India) Sunil-Kumar Sipaeya	(Bulgaria) Todor Enev (Japan) Hiroki Kondo	3–6, 1–6
Win	21–15	Jan 2007	India F1, Kolkata	Futures	Clay	(Russia) Alexander Kudryavtsev	(India) Vijay Kannan (India) Ashutosh Singh	6–4, 6–2
Win	22–15	Feb 2007	India F2, Delhi	Futures	Hard	(Russia) Alexander Kudryavtsev	(India) Sandeep Kirtane (India) Purav Raja	6–4, 6–2
Loss	22–16	Mar 2007	France F5, Poitiers	Futures	Hard	(Romania) Victor Ioniță	(Slovakia) Filip Polášek (Slovakia) Igor Zelenay	4–6, 4–6
Loss	22–17	Jun 2007	Almaty, Kazakhstan	Challenger	Clay	(Russia) Alexander Kudryavtsev	(Slovakia) Kamil Čapkovič (Croatia) Ivan Dodig	4–6, 6–3, [7–10]
Loss	22–18	Jun 2007	Almaty II, Kazakhstan	Challenger	Clay	(Russia) Alexander Kudryavtsev	(Romania) Florin Mergea (Romania) Teodor-Dacian Crăciun	2–6, 1–6
Loss	22–19	Aug 2007	Saransk, Russia	Challenger	Clay	(Italy) Uros Vico	(Netherlands) Antal van der Duim (Netherlands) Boy Westerhof	6–2, 6–7^{(3–7)}, [9–11]
Win	23–19	Aug 2007	Russia F3, Moscow	Futures	Clay	(Russia) Mikhail Elgin	(Russia) Evgeny Donskoy (Russia) Vladimir Karusevich	6–3, 6–0
Win	24–19	Oct 2007	India F10, Gulbarga	Futures	Hard	(India) Vijay Kannan	(India) Tushar Liberhan (India) Rupesh Roy	6–4, 3–6, [10–3]
Win	25–19	Nov 2007	Iran F3, Kish Island	Futures	Clay	(Russia) Valery Rudnev	(Hungary) Attila Balázs (Hungary) György Balázs	7–6^{(7–3)}, 7–5
Win	26–19	Feb 2008	India F1, Kolkata	Futures	Clay	(India) Vijay Kannan	(Chinese Taipei) Huai-En Chang (Chinese Taipei) Hsien-Yin Peng	7–6^{(9–7)}, 7–6^{(7–2)}
Loss	26–20	Mar 2008	India F2, Delhi	Futures	Hard	(India) Vijay Kannan	(India) Vivek Shokeen (India) Ashutosh Singh	6–3, 6–7^{(5–7)}, [5–10]
Win	27–20	May 2008	Korea F1, Gimcheon	Futures	Hard	(Hong Kong) Karan Rastogi	(Australia) Miles Armstrong (Australia) Matthew Ebden	6–4, 3–6, [10–7]
Win	28–20	Jun 2008	Iran F1, Tehran	Futures	Clay	(Egypt) Mohamed Mamoun	(Turkey) Haluk Akkoyun (Turkey) Ergun Zorlu	6–4, 7–6^{(7–2)}
Win	29–20	Jun 2008	Iran F2, Tehran	Futures	Clay	(Egypt) Mohamed Mamoun	(India) Rohan Gajjar (Uzbekistan) Murad Inoyatov	6–0, 7–6^{(7–3)}
Win	30–20	Jul 2008	Kazakhstan F1, Astana	Futures	Hard	(Uzbekistan) Murad Inoyatov	(Ukraine) Oleksandr Agafonov (Ukraine) Dmytro Petrov	7–6^{(13–11)}, 6–4
Loss	30–21	Nov 2008	UAE F1, Dubai	Futures	Hard	(Ukraine) Denys Molchanov	(Switzerland) Marco Chiudinelli (Slovakia) Ivo Klec	1–6, 6–2, [6–10]
Win	31–21	Apr 2009	Russia F2, Tyumen	Futures	Carpet	(Russia) Denis Matsukevich	(Russia) Konstantin Kravchuk (Russia) Evgeny Donskoy	6–3, 6–7^{(7–9)}, [15–13]
Win	32–21	Apr 2009	Uzbekistan F2, Namangan	Futures	Hard	(Kazakhstan) Syrym Abdukhalikov	(Russia) Alexei Filenkov (Russia) Andrei Plotniy	6–4, 3–6, [10–6]
Win	33–21	May 2009	Fergana, Uzbekistan	Challenger	Hard	(Russia) Pavel Chekhov	(Canada) Pierre-Ludovic Duclos (Pakistan) Aisam Qureshi	4–6, 6–3, [10–5]
Loss	33–22	Jul 2009	Penza, Russia	Challenger	Hard	(Russia) Denis Matsukevich	(Russia) Mikhail Elgin (Russia) Alexander Kudryavtsev	6–4, 3–6, [6–10]
Loss	33–23	Aug 2009	Saransk, Russia	Challenger	Clay	(Russia) Denis Matsukevich	(Russia) Mikhail Elgin (Russia) Evgeny Kirillov	2–6, 1–6
Loss	33–24	Aug 2009	Almaty II, Kazakhstan	Challenger	Hard	(Canada) Pierre-Ludovic Duclos	(Ukraine) Denys Molchanov (Chinese Taipei) Yang Tsung-hua	6–4, 6–7^{(5–7)}, [9–11]
Win	34–24	Sep 2009	Turkey F8, istanbul	Futures	Hard	(Japan) Junn Mitsuhashi	(Ukraine) Denys Molchanov (Czech Republic) Pavel Šnobel	2–6, 6–3, [10–8]
Win	35–24	Sep 2009	Turkey F9, istanbul	Futures	Hard	(Japan) Junn Mitsuhashi	(Ukraine) Denys Molchanov (Czech Republic) Pavel Šnobel	6–3, 7–6^{(8–6)}
Loss	35–25	Nov 2009	Yokohama, Japan	Challenger	Hard	(Japan) Junn Mitsuhashi	(Chinese Taipei) Yi Chu-huan (Chinese Taipei) Yang Tsung-hua	7–6^{(11–9)}, 3–6, [10–12]
Loss	35–26	Nov 2009	Toyota, Japan	Challenger	Carpet	(Japan) Junn Mitsuhashi	(Latvia) Andis Juška (Russia) Alexander Kudryavtsev	4–6, 6–7^{(6–8)}
Loss	35–27	Mar 2010	Kazakhstan F2, Almaty	Futures	Hard	(Ukraine) Denys Molchanov	(Russia) Evgeny Kirillov (Russia) Alexander Kudryavtsev	5–7, 4–6
Loss	35–28	Apr 2010	Uzbekistan F1, Andijan	Futures	Hard	(Russia) Mikhail Elgin	(Ukraine) Denys Molchanov (Russia) Alexander Kudryavtsev	2–6, 1–6
Win	36–28	May 2010	Uzbekistan F2, Namangan	Futures	Hard	(Russia) Mikhail Elgin	(India) Rohan Gajjar (Hong Kong) Karan Rastogi	6–4, 7–6^{(7–3)}
Loss	36–29	Aug 2010	Russia F3, Moscow	Futures	Clay	(Russia) Denis Matsukevich	(Belarus) Ilya Belyaev (Russia) Mikhail Elgin	2–6, 2–6
Loss	36–30	Oct 2010	Kazakhstan F4, Astana	Futures	Hard	(Belarus) Sergey Betov	(Belarus) Andrei Vasilevski (Russia) Mikhail Elgin	7–5, 4–6, [4–10]
Win	37–30	Oct 2010	Kazakhstan F5, Almaty	Futures	Hard	(Russia) Sergei Krotiouk	(Russia) Vladislav Dubinsky (Kazakhstan) Serizhan Yessenbekov	6–4, 6–4
Win	38–30	Aug 2011	Kazakhstan F4, Almaty	Futures	Hard	(Russia) Mikhail Vasiliev	(India) Rohan Gajjar (Hong Kong) Karan Rastogi	6–4, 4–6, [11–9]
Win	39–30	Jul 2012	Kazakhstan F7, Astana	Futures	Hard	(Russia) Denis Matsukevich	(Israel) Dor Belfer (Israel) Tal Eros	6–3, 6–3
