= Vivek Shokeen =

Indian tennis player

- Country (sports): India
- Born: 31 July 1987 (age 38); New Delhi, India
- Plays: Right-handed
- Prize money: $33,056

Singles
- Highest ranking: No. 601 (11 September 2006)

Doubles
- Career record: 0–1 (ATP Tour)
- Highest ranking: No. 366 (24 March 2008)

Vivek Shokeen (born 31 July 1987) is an Indian former professional tennis player.

Shokeen, who held a junior world ranking of 26 in the world, represented India in a Davis Cup tie against Uzbekistan in 2007. He was beaten in both of his singles rubbers.

His only ATP Tour main draw appearance came at the 2007 Kingfisher Airlines Tennis Open in Mumbai, partnering Purav Raja in the doubles. He otherwise competed in ITF Futures events and won eight doubles titles.

== See also ==
- List of India Davis Cup team representatives
