= Artem Smirnov (tennis) =

Ukrainian tennis player

Artem Smirnov Артем Смирнов
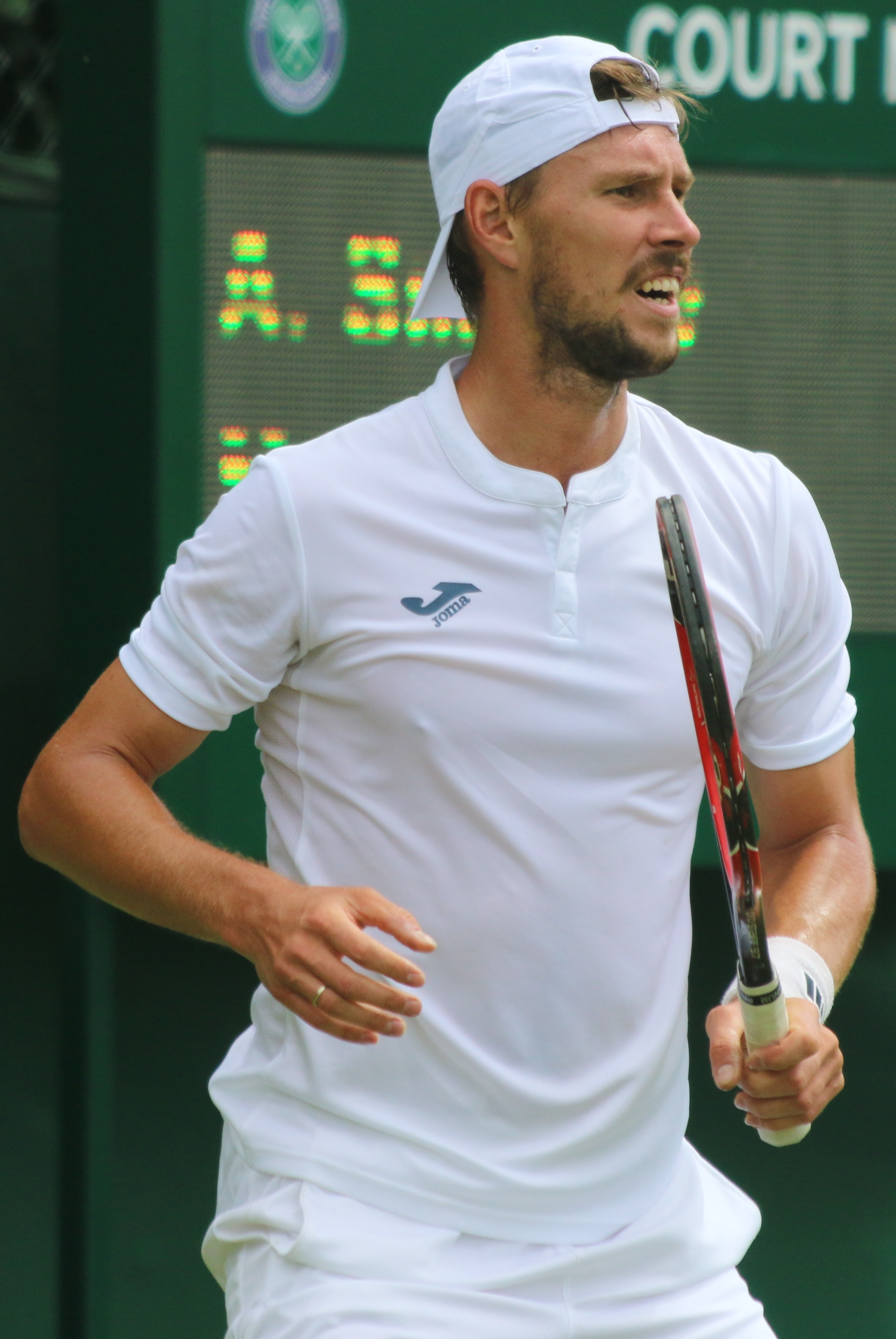
- Country (sports): Ukraine
- Residence: Kiev, Ukraine
- Born: 2 February 1988 (age 38) Kiev, Ukraine
- Height: 1.88 m (6 ft 2 in)
- Plays: Left-handed (two-handed backhand)
- Prize money: US$210,211

Singles
- Career record: 3–8
- Career titles: 0
- Highest ranking: No. 226 (9 May 2016)

Grand Slam singles results
- French Open: Q1 (2016)
- Wimbledon: Q1 (2016)
- Australian Open Junior: 2R (2006)
- US Open Junior: QF (2006)

Doubles
- Career record: 1–2
- Career titles: 0
- Highest ranking: No. 159 (23 August 2010)

Grand Slam doubles results
- Australian Open Junior: 2R (2006)
- US Open Junior: 1R (2006)

Medal record

Tennis

Representing Ukraine

Summer Universiade
Silver medal – second place	2009 Belgrade	Team Event
Bronze medal – third place	2009 Belgrade	Singles

Artem Vitaliyovych Smirnov (Ukrainian: Артем Віталійович Смирнов; born 2 February 1988) is a Ukrainian tennis coach and a former professional player who played on the ATP Challenger Tour. On 9 May 2016, he reached his highest ATP singles ranking of World No. 226 and a best doubles ranking of No. 159, reached on 23 August 2010.

He also played for the Ukraine Davis Cup team.

== ATP Challenger Tour finals ==
=== Singles: 1 (0–1) ===
Legend
ATP Challenger Tour (1–3)

Outcome	No.	Date	Tournament	Surface	Opponent in the final	Score
Runner-up	1.	20 September 2015	Szczecin, Poland	Clay	(Germany) Jan-Lennard Struff	4–6, 3–6

=== Doubles: 4 (1–3) ===
Legend
ATP Challenger Tour (1–3)

Outcome	No.	Date	Tournament	Surface	Partner	Opponents in the final	Score
Runner-up	1.	20 September 2009	Szczecin, Poland	Clay	(Ukraine) Oleksandr Dolgopolov Jr.	(Poland) Tomasz Bednarek (Poland) Mateusz Kowalczyk	3–6, 4–6
Runner-up	2.	28 February 2010	Meknes, Morocco	Clay	(Ukraine) Alexandr Dolgopolov	(Spain) Pablo Andújar (Italy) Flavio Cipolla	2–6, 2–6
Winner	3.	20 June 2010	Bytom, Poland	Clay	(Slovakia) Ivo Klec	(Russia) Konstantin Kravchuk (Ukraine) Ivan Sergeyev	1–6, 6–3, [10–3]
Runner-up	4.	1 August 2010	Saransk, Russia	Clay	(Ukraine) Denys Molchanov	(Russia) Ilya Belyaev (Russia) Michail Elgin	6–3, 6–7^{(6–8)}, [9–11]
