= Ivan Sergeyev (tennis) =

Ukrainian tennis player

- Country (sports): Ukraine
- Residence: Dnipropetrovsk, Ukraine
- Born: 20 January 1988 (age 38) Dnipropetrovsk, Ukraine
- Height: 5 ft 9 in (175 cm)
- Plays: Right-handed (two-handed backhand)
- Prize money: $264,895

Singles
- Career record: 5–1
- Career titles: 0; 2 Challenger, 9 Futures
- Highest ranking: No. 147 (9 August 2010)

Grand Slam singles results
- Australian Open: 2R (2010)
- French Open: Q1 (2008, 2010, 2013)
- US Open: Q2 (2010)

Doubles
- Career record: 0–0
- Career titles: 0; 1 Challenger, 6 Futures
- Highest ranking: No. 230 (29 July 2013)
Medal record
Summer Universiade
Silver medal – second place	2009 Belgrade	Singles
Silver medal – second place	2009 Belgrade	Team Event
- Last updated on: 10 November 2021.

Ivan Sergeyev (born 22 January 1988) is a retired professional Ukrainian tennis player who reached a highest singles ranking of world No. 147 in August 2010.

== Performance timeline ==
Key
W	F	SF	QF	#R	RR	Q#	DNQ	A	NH

(W) winner; (F) finalist; (SF) semifinalist; (QF) quarterfinalist; (#R) rounds 4, 3, 2, 1; (RR) round-robin stage; (Q#) qualification round; (DNQ) did not qualify; (A) absent; (NH) not held; (SR) strike rate (events won / competed); (W–L) win–loss record.

=== Singles ===
Tournament	2008	2009	2010	2011	2012	2013	SR	W–L	Win%
Grand Slam tournaments
Australian Open	A	A	2R	Q2	A	Q1	0 / 1	1–1	50%
French Open	Q1	A	Q1	A	A	Q1	0 / 0	0–0	–
Wimbledon	A	A	A	A	A	A	0 / 0	0–0	–
US Open	A	A	Q2	A	Q1	Q1	0 / 0	0–0	–
Win–loss	0–0	0–0	1–1	0–0	0–0	0–0	0 / 1	1–1	50%
ATP Tour Masters 1000
Indian Wells	A	A	A	A	A	Q1	0 / 0	0–0	–
Miami	A	A	A	A	A	Q1	0 / 0	0–0	–
Win–loss	0–0	0–0	0–0	0–0	0–0	0–0	0 / 0	0–0	–

== ATP Challenger and ITF Futures finals ==
=== Singles: 21 (11–10) ===
Legend ATP Challenger (2–2) ITF Futures (9–8)	Finals by surface Hard (2–4) Clay (9–6) Grass (0–0) Carpet (0–0)

Result	W–L	Date	Tournament	Tier	Surface	Opponent	Score
Loss	0–1	Aug 2006	Romania F16, Arad	Futures	Clay	(Romania) Victor Ioniță	4–6, 3–6
Win	1–1	May 2007	Bulgaria F2, Rousse	Futures	Clay	(Bulgaria) Ivaylo Traykov	3–6, 6–2, 6–2
Win	2–1	Jun 2007	Ukraine F3, Cherkassy	Futures	Clay	(Russia) Mikhail Vasiliev	6–4, 6–0
Loss	2–2	Aug 2007	Saransk, Russia	Challenger	Clay	(Russia) Mikhail Kukushkin	3–6, 1–6
Win	3–2	Aug 2008	Russia F4, Moscow	Futures	Clay	(Moldova) Andrei Gorban	6–4, 6–4
Win	4–2	Mar 2009	Turkey F2, Antalya	Futures	Clay	(Russia) Valery Rudnev	6–3, 6–1
Win	5–2	Apr 2009	Turkey F3, Antalya	Futures	Clay	(Switzerland) Robin Roshardt	6–0, ret.
Loss	5–3	Jul 2009	Georgia F1, Tbilisi	Futures	Clay	(Italy) Matteo Marrai	7–5, 1–6, 3–6
Loss	5–4	Aug 2009	Karshi, Uzbekistan	Challenger	Hard	(Austria) Rainer Eitzinger	3–6, 6–1, 6–7^{(3–7)}
Win	6–4	Aug 2009	Almaty, Kazakhstan	Challenger	Hard	(Jamaica) Dustin Brown	6–3, 5–7, 6–4
Win	7–4	Aug 2010	Saransk, Russia	Challenger	Clay	(Slovakia) Marek Semjan	7–6^{(7–2)}, 6–1
Loss	7–5	Mar 2012	Ukraine F2, Cherkassy	Futures	Hard	(Latvia) Andis Juška	6–7^{(4–7)}, 6–7^{(4–7)}
Win	8–5	Mar 2012	Turkey F11, Antalya	Futures	Clay	(France) Florian Reynet	6–2, 6–2
Win	9–5	Apr 2012	Uzbekistan F1, Namangan	Futures	Hard	(Belarus) Uladzimir Ignatik	7–6^{(7–5)}, 6–1
Loss	9–6	Apr 2012	Uzbekistan F2, Andijan	Futures	Hard	(India) Vishnu Vardhan	3–6, 6–7^{(1–7)}
Win	10–6	May 2012	Bulgaria F1, Varna	Futures	Clay	(Romania) Teodor-Dacian Crăciun	6–0, ret.
Win	11–6	May 2012	Bulgaria F2, Plovdiv	Futures	Clay	(Italy) Edoardo Eremin	6–4, 6–2
Loss	11–7	Jun 2012	Turkey F21, Mersin	Futures	Clay	(France) Florian Reynet	6–4, 1–6, 4–6
Loss	11–8	Jun 2012	Turkey F22, Konya	Futures	Hard	(Ukraine) Oleksandr Nedovyesov	2–6, 6–7^{(2–7)}
Loss	11–9	Jun 2012	Russia F8, Kazan	Futures	Clay	(Russia) Nikoloz Basilashvili	4–6, 6–7^{(3–7)}
Loss	11–10	Jul 2012	Russia F9, Kazan	Futures	Clay	(Russia) Andrey Kumantsov	3–6, 6–3, 4–6

=== Doubles: 12 (7–5) ===
Legend ATP Challenger (1–2) ITF Futures (6–3)	Finals by surface Hard (2–0) Clay (5–5) Grass (0–0) Carpet (0–0)

Result	W–L	Date	Tournament	Tier	Surface	Partner	Opponents	Score
Loss	0–1	Sep 2006	Romania F18, Timișoara	Futures	Clay	(France) Paterne Mamata	(Italy) Paolo Beninca (Germany) Thomas-Cristian Hodel	4–6, 3–6
Loss	0–2	Jul 2007	France F11, Saint-Gervais	Futures	Clay	(Portugal) Leonardo Tavares	(France) Jonathan Eysseric (France) Adrian Mannarino	1–6, 4–6
Win	1–2	Nov 2008	United Arab Emirates F2, Fujairah	Futures	Hard	(Ukraine) Denys Molchanov	(Denmark) Thomas Kromann (Sweden) Filip Prpic	2–6, 7–5, [10–5]
Loss	1–3	Jul 2009	Georgia F2, Tbilisi	Futures	Clay	(Ukraine) Oleksandr Agafonov	(Ukraine) Ivan Anikanov (Ukraine) Artem Smirnov	3–6, 6–3, [7–10]
Loss	1–4	Aug 2009	Samarkand, Uzbekistan	Challenger	Clay	(Russia) Valery Rudnev	(Australia) Kaden Hensel (Australia) Adam Hubble	5–7, 5–7
Loss	1–5	Jun 2010	Bytom, Poland	Challenger	Clay	(Russia) Konstantin Kravchuk	(Slovakia) Ivo Klec (Ukraine) Artem Smirnov	6–1, 3–6, [3–10]
Win	2–5	Mar 2012	Turkey F11, Antalya	Futures	Clay	(Moldova) Andrei Ciumac	(Sweden) Patrik Brydolf (France) Florian Reynet	6–3, 7–6^{(7–5)}
Win	3–5	May 2012	Bulgaria F1, Varna	Futures	Clay	(Ukraine) Aleksandr Nedovyesov	(Bulgaria) Valentin Dimov (Bulgaria) Dimitar Kuzmanov	6–1, 6–1
Win	4–5	Jun 2012	Turkey F21, Mersin	Futures	Clay	(Ukraine) Aleksandr Nedovyesov	(Australia) Brydan Klein (Australia) Maverick Banes	3–6, 6–1, [10–7]
Win	5–5	Jun 2012	Turkey F22, Konya	Futures	Hard	(Ukraine) Aleksandr Nedovyesov	(United States) William Boe-Wiegaard (Republic of Ireland) Daniel Glancy	7–6^{(7–5)}, 6–1
Win	6–5	Jun 2012	Russia F8, Kazan	Futures	Clay	(Ukraine) Aleksandr Nedovyesov	(Russia) Aleksandr Lobkov (Russia) Alexander Rumyantsev	6–2, 6–4
Win	7–5	Aug 2012	Samarkand, Uzbekistan	Challenger	Clay	(Ukraine) Aleksandr Nedovyesov	(India) Divij Sharan (India) Vishnu Vardhan	6–4, 7–6^{(7–1)}
