= Mordovia Cup =

ATP Challenger Tour
- Event name: Saransk
- Location: Saransk, Russia
- Category: ATP Challenger Tour
- Surface: Clay (red)
- Draw: 32S/32Q/16D
- Prize money: $50,000

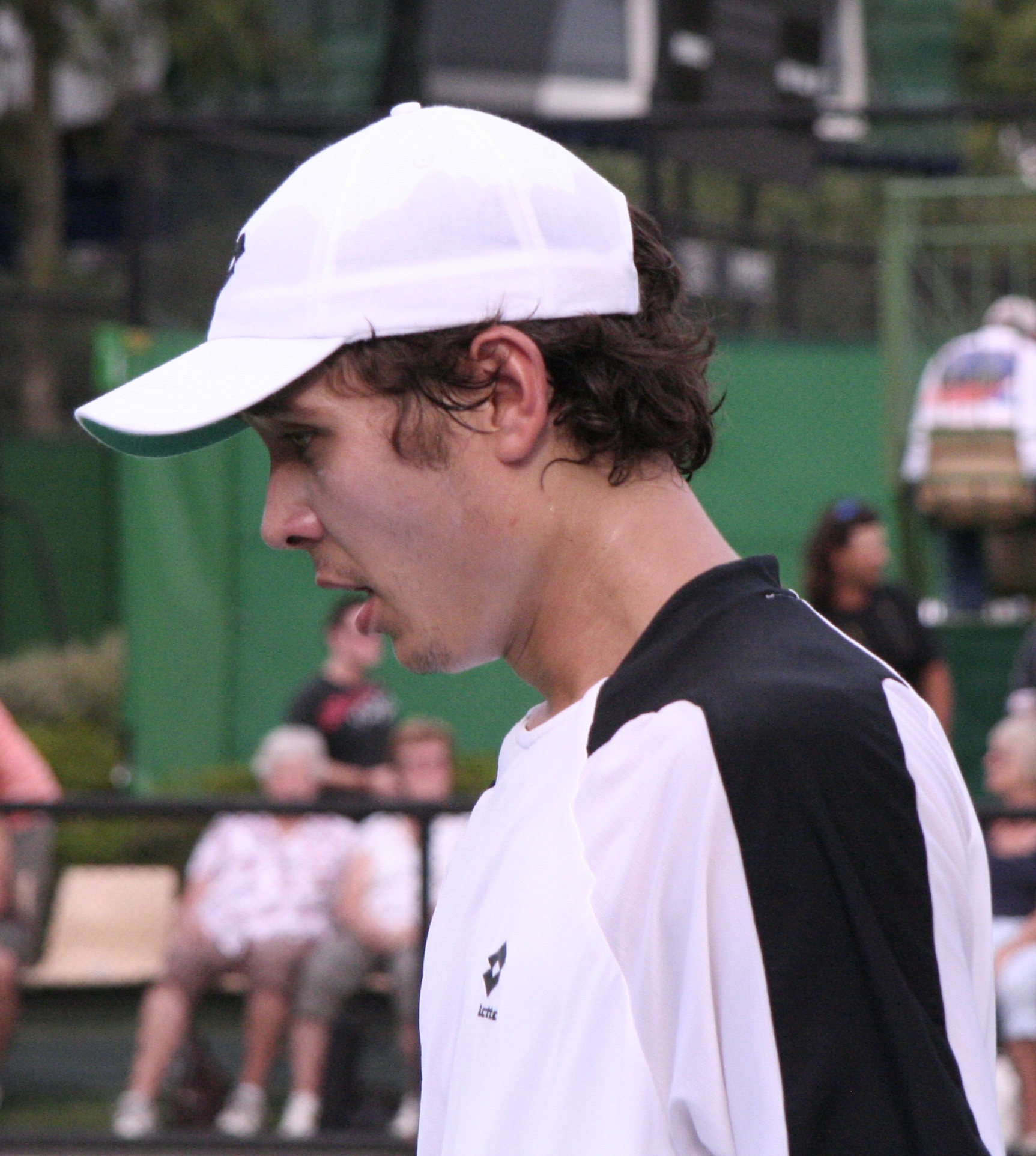
Igor Kunitsyn was the first of three Russian players to win the singles title in six editions

The Mordovia Cup is a professional tennis tournament played on outdoor red clay courts. It is currently part of the Association of Tennis Professionals (ATP) Challenger Tour. It is held annually in Saransk, Russia, since 2003.

== Past finals ==
=== Singles ===
Year	Champion	Runner-up	Score
2010	(Ukraine) Ivan Sergeyev	(Slovakia) Marek Semjan	7–6(2), 6–1
2009	(Spain) Iñigo Cervantes	(France) Jonathan Dasnières de Veigy	7–5, 6–4
2008	(Russia) Michail Elgin	(Uzbekistan) Denis Istomin	7–6(6), 3–6, 6–3
2007	(Kazakhstan) Mikhail Kukushkin	(Ukraine) Ivan Sergeyev	6–3, 6–1
2006	(Netherlands) Igor Sijsling	(Uzbekistan) Farrukh Dustov	7–6(8), 6–4
2005	(Russia) Igor Kunitsyn	(Serbia and Montenegro) Boris Pašanski	7–5, 6–4
2004	(Slovakia) Ladislav Švarc	(Belgium) Stefan Wauters	6–2, 6–7(4), 6–0
2003	(Czech Republic) Martin Štěpánek	(Slovakia) Michal Mertiňák	6–1, 6–1

=== Doubles ===
Year	Champions	Runners-up	Score
2010	(Russia) Ilya Belyaev (Russia) Michail Elgin	(Ukraine) Denys Molchanov (Ukraine) Artem Smirnov	3–6, 7–6(6), [11–9]
2009	(Russia) Michail Elgin (Russia) Evgeny Kirillov	(Kazakhstan) Alexey Kedryuk (Russia) Denis Matsukevich	6–1, 6–2
2008	(Uzbekistan) Denis Istomin (Russia) Evgeny Kirillov	(Russia) Alexandre Krasnoroutskiy (Russia) Denis Matsukevich	6–2, 7–6(9)
2007	(Netherlands) Antal van der Duim (Netherlands) Boy Westerhof	(Kazakhstan) Alexey Kedryuk (Italy) Uros Vico	2–6, 7–6(3), 11–9
2006	(Kazakhstan) Alexey Kedryuk (Ukraine) Orest Tereshchuk	(Netherlands) Robin Haase (Israel) Dekel Valtzer	6–4, 5–7, 10–5
2005	(Italy) Flavio Cipolla (Germany) Simon Stadler	(Russia) Konstantin Kravchuk (Russia) Alexander Kudryavtsev	7–6(2), 4–6, 7–6(3)
2004	(Kazakhstan) Alexey Kedryuk (Uzbekistan) Vadim Kutsenko	(Russia) Kirill Ivanov-Smolensky (Russia) Andrei Stoliarov	6–1, 3–6, 6–4
2003	(Hungary) Kornél Bardóczky (Czech Republic) Martin Štěpánek	(Poland) Łukasz Kubot (Ukraine) Orest Tereshchuk	7–6(3), 6–3
