= David Savić =

Serbian tennis player and coach

- Country (sports): Serbia
- Born: 23 August 1985 (age 41) Belgrade, Yugoslavia
- Retired: 2011 (banned)
- Plays: Right-handed (two-handed backhand)
- Coach: Dragan Savić & Zoran Zdravković
- Prize money: $86,727

Singles
- Career record: 0–0
- Career titles: 0
- Highest ranking: No. 363 (12 October 2009)

Doubles
- Career record: 2–3
- Career titles: 0
- Highest ranking: No. 193 (13 September 2010)

David Savić (Serbian pronunciation: [dǎʋid sǎːʋitɕ]; born August 23, 1985) is a Serbian tennis coach and former professional tennis player. In 2012 he was banned from tennis for match-fixing. After an appeal to the Court of Arbitration for Sport, the permanent suspension was upheld but the fine was withdrawn.

He is the coach of Serbian tennis player Danilo Petrović.

== Personal ==
His father is Dragan Savić, Serbian former tennis player who represented Yugoslavia in Davis Cup.
