= Ilya Belyaev =

Russian tennis player

Ilya Belyaev Илья Беляев
- Country (sports): Russia
- Residence: Moscow, Russia
- Born: 9 August 1990 (age 35) Moscow, Russian SFSR, Soviet Union
- Height: 1.80 m (5 ft 11 in)
- Turned pro: 2005
- Plays: Right-handed
- Prize money: US$90,328

Singles
- Career record: 0–1
- Career titles: 0
- Highest ranking: No. 272 (21 February 2011)

Doubles
- Career record: 0–1
- Career titles: 0
- Highest ranking: No. 221 (18 April 2011)

Ilya Belyaev (Russian: Илья Беляев) (born 9 August 1990) is a Russian tennis player playing on the ATP Challenger Tour. Balyaev has a highest ATP singles ranking of World No. 272 achieved on 21 February 2011 and a highest doubles ranking of No. 221 was achieved on 18 April 2011. He is coached by Mikhail Chesalov.

== Challenger finals ==
Legend
ATP Challenger Tour (1–0)

=== Doubles: 1 (1–0) ===
Outcome	No.	Date	Tournament	Surface	Partner	Opponents in the final	Score
Winners	1.	1 August 2010	Saransk, Russia	Clay	(Russia) Michail Elgin	(Ukraine) Denys Molchanov (Ukraine) Artem Smirnov	3–6, 7–6^{6}, [11–9]
