= Andrei Gorban =

Moldovan tennis player

- Country (sports): Moldova
- Born: 19 July 1983 (age 42)
- Prize money: $48,213

Singles
- Career record: 3–6
- Career titles: 0
- Highest ranking: No. 343 (13 July 2009)

Doubles
- Career record: 0–3
- Career titles: 0
- Highest ranking: No. 553 (27 July 2009)
- Current ranking: NR
- Last updated on: 25 November 2013.

Andrei Gorban (born 19 July 1983) is a professional tennis player from Moldova. He is a permanent member of the Moldova Davis Cup team.
