= 2010 Košice Open – Singles =

Singles
- 2010 Košice Open

Final
- Champion: (Spain) Rubén Ramírez Hidalgo
- Runner-up: (Serbia) Filip Krajinović
- Score: 6–3, 6–2

Events
Singles	Doubles
← 2009 ·	Košice Open	· 2011 →

Stéphane Robert was the defending champion, but he chose not to compete this year.
Rubén Ramírez Hidalgo won in the final 6–3, 6–2 against Filip Krajinović.

== Seeds ==
1. (Czech Republic) Jan Hájek (first round)
2. (Italy) Fabio Fognini (second round)
3. (Spain) Rubén Ramírez Hidalgo (champion)
4. (Spain) Óscar Hernández (first round)
5. (Kazakhstan) Mikhail Kukushkin (semifinals)
6. (France) David Guez (first round)
7. (Romania) Victor Crivoi (quarterfinals)
8. (Germany) Dieter Kindlmann (second round)

== Draw ==
=== Key ===
- Q = Qualifier
- WC = Wild card
- LL = Lucky loser
- Alt = Alternate
- SE = Special exempt
- PR = Protected ranking
- ITF = ITF entry
- JE = Junior exempt
- w/o = Walkover
- r = Retired
- d = Defaulted
- SR = Special ranking

=== Finals ===
Semifinals
5	(Kazakhstan) Mikhail Kukushkin	6	5	5
3	(Spain) Rubén Ramírez Hidalgo	2	7	7
(Brazil) Caio Zampieri	6	1	1
(Serbia) Filip Krajinović	4	6	6

Final
3	(Spain) Rubén Ramírez Hidalgo	6	6
(Serbia) Filip Krajinović	3	2

=== Top half ===
First round
1	(Czech Republic) J Hájek	1	5
(Czech Republic) I Minář	6	7
(Belgium) Y Mertens	2	2
(Canada) P Polansky	6	6
(Kazakhstan) Y Schukin	6	7
(Slovakia) M Kližan	3	6^{3}
WC	(Czech Republic) M Přikryl	2	0
5	(Kazakhstan) M Kukushkin	6	6
3	(Spain) R Ramírez Hidalgo	6	6
(Czech Republic) J Vaněk	3	4
WC	(Slovakia) A Martin	6	5	3
(France) J Dasnières de Veigy	3	7	6
Q	(Czech Republic) J Minář	6	6
(Hungary) A Balázs	4	0
(Chile) P Capdeville	6	2	2
7	(Romania) V Crivoi	3	6	6

Second round
(Czech Republic) I Minář	6	6
(Canada) P Polansky	4	3
(Kazakhstan) Y Schukin	4	6	3
5	(Kazakhstan) M Kukushkin	6	4	6
3	(Spain) R Ramírez Hidalgo	6	6
(France) J Dasnières de Veigy	3	0
Q	(Czech Republic) J Minář	6	2	2
7	(Romania) V Crivoi	2	6	6

Quarterfinals
(Czech Republic) I Minář	2	5
5	(Kazakhstan) M Kukushkin	6	7
3	(Spain) R Ramírez Hidalgo	2	6	6
7	(Romania) V Crivoi	6	1	4

Semifinals
5	(Kazakhstan) M Kukushkin	6	5	5
3	(Spain) R Ramírez Hidalgo	2	7	7

=== Bottom half ===
First round
6	(France) D Guez	3	6	2
(Czech Republic) L Rosol	6	3	6
Q	(Slovakia) M Semjan	4	2
(Brazil) C Zampieri	6	6
(France) L Recouderc	6	6
WC	(Poland) M Kowalczyk	2	1
(Chile) J Aguilar	6	6
4	(Spain) Ó Hernández	2	4
8	(Germany) D Kindlmann	6	6
(Brazil) R Hocevar	4	2
(Serbia) F Krajinović	1	7	6
Q	(Russia) A Lobkov	6	5	3
(Monaco) B Balleret	6^{7}	0
WC	(Slovakia) M Mečíř Jr.	7	6
Q	(Ukraine) A Smirnov	4	7	1
2	(Italy) F Fognini	6	5	6

Second round
(Czech Republic) L Rosol	4	6	4
(Brazil) C Zampieri	6	0	6
(France) L Recouderc	1	3
(Chile) J Aguilar	6	6
8	(Germany) D Kindlmann	2	1
(Serbia) F Krajinović	6	6
WC	(Slovakia) M Mečíř Jr.	2	6	6
2	(Italy) F Fognini	6	4	4

Quarterfinals
(Brazil) C Zampieri	5	7	6
(Chile) J Aguilar	7	6^{4}	4
(Serbia) F Krajinović	6	6
WC	(Slovakia) M Mečíř Jr.	2	4

Semifinals
(Brazil) C Zampieri	6	1	1
(Serbia) F Krajinović	4	6	6
