= 2010 Astana Cup – Singles =

Singles
- 2010 Astana Cup

Final
- Champion: (Russia) Igor Kunitsyn
- Runner-up: (Russia) Konstantin Kravchuk
- Score: 4–6, 7–6(5), 7–6(3)

Events
Singles	Doubles
← 2009 ·	Astana Cup	· 2011 →

Andrey Golubev was the defending champion but decided not to participate this year.
First-seeded Igor Kunitsyn defeated second-seeded compatriot Konstantin Kravchuk 4–6, 7–6(5), 7–6(3) in the final.

== Seeds ==
1. (Russia) Igor Kunitsyn (champion)
2. (Russia) Konstantin Kravchuk (final)
3. (Slovakia) Andrej Martin (semifinals)
4. (Slovakia) Marek Semjan (quarterfinals)
5. (Russia) Andrey Kumantsov (second round)
6. (Russia) Artem Sitak (first round)
7. (Czech Republic) Jan Minář (first round, retired)
8. (China) Zhang Ze (quarterfinals)

== Draw ==
=== Key ===
- Q = Qualifier
- WC = Wild card
- LL = Lucky loser
- Alt = Alternate
- SE = Special exempt
- PR = Protected ranking
- ITF = ITF entry
- JE = Junior exempt
- w/o = Walkover
- r = Retired
- d = Defaulted
- SR = Special ranking

=== Finals ===
Semifinals
1	(Russia) Igor Kunitsyn	6	6
3	(Slovakia) Andrej Martin	1	2
(Israel) Amir Weintraub	3	6	2
2	(Russia) Konstantin Kravchuk	6	4	6

Final
1	(Russia) Igor Kunitsyn	4	7	7
2	(Russia) Konstantin Kravchuk	6	6^{5}	6^{3}

=== Top half ===
First round
1	(Russia) I Kunitsyn	4	6	6
Q	(Russia) D Matsukevich	6	3	2
(China) D Wu	6	6
(France) L Walter	2	1
(Argentina) J-M Valverde	6	1	6^{2}
(Japan) H Kondo	1	6	7
LL	(Russia) M Elgin	3	4
5	(Russia) A Kumantsov	6	6
3	(Slovakia) A Martin	6	6
WC	(India) Y Bhambri	2	4
Q	(Australia) S Groth	6	6
(South Korea) D Yoo	4	2
SE	(New Zealand) M Venus	6	6
WC	(Kazakhstan) A Saranchukov	1	1
(Slovakia) M Mečíř Jr.	7	6
6	(Russia) A Sitak	5	0

Second round
1	(Russia) I Kunitsyn	6	6
(China) D Wu	2	0
(Japan) H Kondo	6	6
5	(Russia) A Kumantsov	3	3
3	(Slovakia) A Martin	6	7
Q	(Australia) S Groth	4	6^{4}
SE	(New Zealand) M Venus	5	6	7
(Slovakia) M Mečíř Jr.	7	3	6^{3}

Quarterfinals
1	(Russia) I Kunitsyn	6	6
(Japan) H Kondo	2	3
3	(Slovakia) A Martin	7	2	7
SE	(New Zealand) M Venus	6^{5}	6	6^{2}

Semifinals
1	(Russia) I Kunitsyn	6	6
3	(Slovakia) A Martin	1	2

=== Bottom half ===
First round
7	(Czech Republic) J Minář	2	r
WC	(Kazakhstan) S Yessenbekov	1
(Israel) A Weintraub	4	6	6
(Japan) H Moriya	6	2	4
(New Zealand) J Statham	6	6
LL	(Israel) G Ben Zvi	0	0
(China) M-X Gong	2	4
4	(Slovakia) M Semjan	6	6
8	(China) Z Zhang	7	6
(South Korea) W-s Jun	5	2
Q	(Austria) N Moser	6	2	6
(Russia) V Rudnev	4	6	4
Q	(Australia) S Kadir	4	1
(Japan) J Mitsuhashi	6	6
(Kazakhstan) A Kedryuk	6^{1}	1
2	(Russia) K Kravchuk	7	6

Second round
WC	(Kazakhstan) S Yessenbekov	4	1
(Israel) A Weintraub	6	6
(New Zealand) J Statham	6^{0}	4
4	(Slovakia) M Semjan	7	6
8	(China) Z Zhang	7	6
Q	(Austria) N Moser	5	4
(Japan) J Mitsuhashi	6	1	1
2	(Russia) K Kravchuk	4	6	6

Quarterfinals
(Israel) A Weintraub	6	6^{4}	6
4	(Slovakia) M Semjan	2	7	4
8	(China) Z Zhang	6^{0}	1
2	(Russia) K Kravchuk	7	6

Semifinals
(Israel) A Weintraub	3	6	2
2	(Russia) K Kravchuk	6	4	6
