= 2012 Košice Open – Singles =

Singles
- 2012 Košice Open

Final
- Champion: (Slovenia) Aljaž Bedene
- Runner-up: (Germany) Simon Greul
- Score: 7–6^{(7–1)}, 6–2

Events
Singles	Doubles
← 2011 ·	Košice Open	· 2013 →

Simon Greul was the defending champion but lost in the final to Aljaž Bedene.

== Seeds ==
1. (Italy) Alessandro Giannessi (quarterfinals)
2. (Czech Republic) Jan Hájek (semifinals)
3. (Portugal) João Sousa (second round)
4. (Slovenia) Aljaž Bedene (champion)
5. (Austria) Andreas Haider-Maurer (first round)
6. (Chinese Taipei) Yang Tsung-hua (second round)
7. (Spain) Arnau Brugués Davi (quarterfinals)
8. (France) Marc Gicquel (first round)

== Draw ==
=== Key ===
- Q = Qualifier
- WC = Wild card
- LL = Lucky loser
- Alt = Alternate
- SE = Special exempt
- PR = Protected ranking
- ITF = ITF entry
- JE = Junior exempt
- w/o = Walkover
- r = Retired
- d = Defaulted
- SR = Special ranking

=== Finals ===
Semifinals
(Germany) Simon Greul	6	6
(Bosnia and Herzegovina) Damir Džumhur	2	4
4	(Slovenia) Aljaž Bedene	4	6	6
2	(Czech Republic) Jan Hájek	6	2	4

Finals
(Germany) Simon Greul	6^{1}	2
4	(Slovenia) Aljaž Bedene	7^{7}	6

=== Top half ===
First round
1	(Italy) A Giannessi	7^{7}	4	6
(Finland) H Heliövaara	6^{1}	6	3
(Germany) P Gojowczyk	1	6	3
Q	(Germany) Nils Langer	6	4	6
(Germany) S Greul	6	6
WC	(Slovakia) Patrik Fabian	4	1
(Serbia) F Krajinović	7	4	1
6	(Chinese Taipei) T-h Yang	5	6	6
3	(Portugal) J Sousa	2	6	6
(Spain) I Navarro	6	2	3
(Slovakia) K Čapkovič	5	3
WC	(Slovakia) M Mečíř	7	6
(Bosnia and Herzegovina) D Džumhur	1	6	6
Q	(Poland) M Gawron	6	2	1
WC	(Czech Republic) J Veselý	3	2
8	(France) M Gicquel	6	0^{r}

Second round
1	(Italy) A Giannessi	6	6
Q	(Germany) Nils Langer	1	3
(Germany) S Greul	4	7^{11}	7^{7}
6	(Chinese Taipei) T-h Yang	6	6^{9}	6^{3}
3	(Portugal) J Sousa	4	4
WC	(Slovakia) M Mečíř	6	6
(Bosnia and Herzegovina) D Džumhur	4	7^{7}	6
WC	(Czech Republic) J Veselý	6	6^{5}	0

Quarterfinals
1	(Italy) A Giannessi	2	1
(Germany) S Greul	6	6
WC	(Slovakia) M Mečíř	6^{4}	6	4
(Bosnia and Herzegovina) D Džumhur	7^{7}	4	6

Semifinals
(Germany) S Greul	6	6
(Bosnia and Herzegovina) D Džumhur	2	4

=== Bottom half ===
First round
7	(Spain) A Brugués Davi	6	6
(Canada) P Polansky	2	4
(Dominican Republic) V Estrella	6^{5}	2
(Czech Republic) D Lojda	7^{7}	6
(Portugal) G Elias	2	5
(Czech Republic) I Minář	6	7
(Slovakia) P Červenák	2	6^{5}
4	(Slovenia) A Bedene	6	7^{7}
5	(Austria) A Haider-Maurer	2	4
(Romania) V Crivoi	6	6
WC	(Slovakia) D Hrbatý	6	6
(Argentina) A Velotti	4	3
Q	(Slovakia) A Martin	6	6
(Uruguay) M Felder	3	4
Q	(Romania) M Copil	6^{1}	2
2	(Czech Republic) J Hájek	7^{7}	6

Second round
7	(Spain) A Brugués Davi	7	6
(Czech Republic) D Lojda	5	2
(Czech Republic) I Minář	4	2
4	(Slovenia) A Bedene	6	6
(Romania) V Crivoi	6	6
WC	(Slovakia) D Hrbatý	4	3
Q	(Slovakia) A Martin	3	1
2	(Czech Republic) J Hájek	6	6

Quarterfinals
7	(Spain) A Brugués Davi	7	4	2
4	(Slovenia) A Bedene	5	6	6
(Romania) V Crivoi	1	6	5
2	(Czech Republic) J Hájek	6	4	7

Semifinals
4	(Slovenia) A Bedene	4	6	6
2	(Czech Republic) J Hájek	6	2	4
