= 2011 Astana Cup – Singles =

Singles
- 2011 Astana Cup

Final
- Champion: (Germany) Rainer Schüttler
- Runner-up: (Russia) Teymuraz Gabashvili
- Score: 7–6^{(8–6)}, 4–6, 6–4

Details
- Draw: 32
- Seeds: 8

Events
Singles	Doubles
← 2010 ·	Astana Cup	· 2012 →

Igor Kunitsyn was the defending champion but decided not to participate.

Rainer Schüttler claimed the title. He won against Teymuraz Gabashvili 7–6^{(8–6)}, 4–6, 6–4 in the final.

== Seeds ==
1. (Germany) Rainer Schüttler (champion)
2. (Russia) Teymuraz Gabashvili (final)
3. (Russia) Alexander Kudryavtsev (semifinals)
4. (Russia) Konstantin Kravchuk (first round)
5. (Slovakia) Andrej Martin (first round)
6. (South Africa) Raven Klaasen (first round)
7. (Moldova) Radu Albot (quarterfinals)
8. (France) Fabrice Martin (quarterfinals)

== Draw ==
=== Key ===
- Q = Qualifier
- WC = Wild card
- LL = Lucky loser
- Alt = Alternate
- SE = Special exempt
- PR = Protected ranking
- ITF = ITF entry
- JE = Junior exempt
- w/o = Walkover
- r = Retired
- d = Defaulted
- SR = Special ranking

=== Finals ===
Semifinals
1	(Germany) Rainer Schüttler	6^{5}	7	6
(United Kingdom) Jamie Baker	7^{7}	5	2
3	(Russia) Alexander Kudryavtsev	3	6	2
2	(Russia) Teymuraz Gabashvili	6	2	6

Final
1	(Germany) Rainer Schüttler	7^{8}	4	6
2	(Russia) Teymuraz Gabashvili	6^{6}	6	4

=== Top half ===
First round
1	(Germany) R Schüttler	6	6
WC	(India) K Rastogi	0	1
(Russia) Mikhail Vasiliev	2	5
(Ukraine) D Molchanov	6	7
(United Kingdom) J Milton	6	6
(India) V Vardhan	3	4
WC	(Kazakhstan) Anton Saranchukov	4	2
8	(France) F Martin	6	6
4	(Russia) K Kravchuk	7^{7}	6^{8}	6^{3}
(United Kingdom) J Baker	6^{3}	7^{10}	7^{7}
(Slovakia) M Mečíř Jr.	7	2	2
Q	(Russia) M Elgin	5	6	6
(Russia) I Belyaev	4	7	7^{7}
(Russia) V Rudnev	6	5	6^{2}
Q	(Uzbekistan) S Ikramov	4	3
7	(Moldova) R Albot	6	6

Second round
1	(Germany) R Schüttler	6	6
(Ukraine) D Molchanov	1	1
(United Kingdom) J Milton	4	3
8	(France) F Martin	6	6
(United Kingdom) J Baker	6	6
Q	(Russia) M Elgin	1	1
(Russia) I Belyaev	1	1
7	(Moldova) R Albot	6	6

Quarterfinals
1	(Germany) R Schüttler	6	6
8	(France) F Martin	2	3
(United Kingdom) J Baker	7	6
7	(Moldova) R Albot	5	3

Semifinals
1	(Germany) R Schüttler	6^{5}	7	6
(United Kingdom) J Baker	7^{7}	5	2

=== Bottom half ===
First round
6	(South Africa) R Klaasen	3	6	6^{6}
(Czech Republic) J Minář	6	3	7^{8}
(Japan) H Moriya	7	6
WC	(Kazakhstan) Serizhan Yessenbekov	5	2
(Italy) R Ghedin	6	2	2
Q	(United Kingdom) A Ward	2	6	6
Q	(Egypt) M Safwat	1	6	6^{6}
3	(Russia) A Kudryavtsev	6	1	7^{8}
5	(Slovakia) A Martin	1	5
(Chinese Taipei) T Chen	6	7
(Ukraine) A Smirnov	6^{3}	3
(Finland) H Heliövaara	7^{7}	6
WC	(Kazakhstan) D Yevseyev	6	1	4
(United Kingdom) D Cox	2	6	6
(Brazil) D Dutra da Silva	6	2	3
2	(Russia) T Gabashvili	2	6	6

Second round
(Czech Republic) J Minář	4	6	6
(Japan) H Moriya	6	3	4
Q	(United Kingdom) A Ward	6	5	2
3	(Russia) A Kudryavtsev	3	7	6
(Chinese Taipei) T Chen	6	4	6
(Finland) H Heliövaara	4	6	2
(United Kingdom) D Cox	5	1
2	(Russia) T Gabashvili	7	6

Quarterfinals
(Czech Republic) J Minář	2	5
3	(Russia) A Kudryavtsev	6	7
(Chinese Taipei) T Chen	6	2	3
2	(Russia) T Gabashvili	3	6	6

Semifinals
3	(Russia) A Kudryavtsev	3	6	2
2	(Russia) T Gabashvili	6	2	6
