= 2011 Košice Open – Doubles =

Doubles
- 2011 Košice Open

Final
- Champions: (Germany) Simon Greul (Germany) Bastian Knittel
- Runners-up: (Argentina) Facundo Bagnis (Argentina) Eduardo Schwank
- Score: 2–6, 6–3, [11–9]

Events
Singles	Doubles
← 2010 ·	Košice Open	· 2012 →

Miloslav Mečíř Jr. and Marek Semjan were the defending champions, but they lost to Simon Greul and Bastian Knittel 3–6, 4–6.
Simon Greul and Bastian Knittel won the title, defeating Facundo Bagnis and Eduardo Schwank 2–6, 6–3, [11–9] in the final.

== Seeds ==
1. (Argentina) Brian Dabul / (Brazil) Franco Ferreiro (quarterfinals)
2. (Australia) Jordan Kerr / (United States) Travis Parrott (first round)
3. (Spain) Daniel Muñoz-de la Nava / (Kazakhstan) Yuri Schukin (withdrew)
4. (Spain) Javier Martí / (Spain) Rubén Ramírez Hidalgo (first round)

== Draw ==
=== Key ===
- Q = Qualifier
- WC = Wild card
- LL = Lucky loser
- Alt = Alternate
- SE = Special exempt
- PR = Protected ranking
- ITF = ITF entry
- JE = Junior exempt
- w/o = Walkover
- r = Retired
- d = Defaulted
- SR = Special ranking

=== Draw ===
First round
1	(Argentina) B Dabul (Brazil) F Ferreiro	6	6
Alt	(Italy) Andrea Arnaboldi (Italy) M Viola	3	1
(Germany) S Greul (Germany) B Knittel	6	6
WC	(Slovakia) M Mečíř Jr. (Slovakia) M Semjan	3	4
Alt	(Russia) I Belyaev (Russia) E Donskoy	6	6
(Romania) V Crivoi (Brazil) R Hocevar	2	3
(United States) W Odesnik (Spain) G Olaso	4	6	[10]
(Canada) P-L Duclos (France) M Teixeira	6	3	[6]
WC	(Slovakia) Marko Daniš (Slovakia) Juraj Masár	3	0
WC	(Slovakia) D Hrbatý (Czech Republic) L Rosol	6	6
(Argentina) A Molteni (Brazil) J Silva	6	7
4	(Spain) J Martí (Spain) R Ramírez Hidalgo	2	5
(France) A Gensse (France) D Guez	5	5
(South Africa) J Coetzee (Serbia) D Vemić	7	7
(Argentina) F Bagnis (Argentina) E Schwank	6	6
2	(Australia) J Kerr (United States) T Parrott	3	1

Quarterfinals
1	(Argentina) B Dabul (Brazil) F Ferreiro	3	4
(Germany) S Greul (Germany) B Knittel	6	6
Alt	(Russia) I Belyaev (Russia) E Donskoy	7	7
(United States) W Odesnik (Spain) G Olaso	5	5
WC	(Slovakia) D Hrbatý (Czech Republic) L Rosol	w/o
(Argentina) A Molteni (Brazil) J Silva
(South Africa) J Coetzee (Serbia) D Vemić	6	3	[7]
(Argentina) F Bagnis (Argentina) E Schwank	4	6	[10]

Semifinals
(Germany) S Greul (Germany) B Knittel	6	6
Alt	(Russia) I Belyaev (Russia) E Donskoy	4	2
(Argentina) A Molteni (Brazil) J Silva	1	6	[9]
(Argentina) F Bagnis (Argentina) E Schwank	6	4	[11]

Final
(Germany) S Greul (Germany) B Knittel	2	6	[11]
(Argentina) F Bagnis (Argentina) E Schwank	6	3	[9]
