= 2009 Košice Open – Doubles =

Doubles
- 2009 Košice Open

Final
- Champions: (Spain) Rubén Ramírez Hidalgo (Spain) Santiago Ventura
- Runners-up: (Slovakia) Dominik Hrbatý (Slovakia) Martin Kližan
- Score: 6–2, 7–6(5)

Events
Singles	Doubles
← 2008 ·	Košice Open	· 2010 →

Tomasz Bednarek and Igor Zelenay were the defending champions. They didn't participate that year.
Rubén Ramírez Hidalgo and Santiago Ventura defeated Dominik Hrbatý and Martin Kližan 6–2, 7–6(5) in the final.

== Seeds ==
1. (Spain) Rubén Ramírez Hidalgo / (Spain) Santiago Ventura (champions)
2. (Spain) David Marrero / (Spain) Pablo Santos (first round)
3. (Russia) Denis Matsukevich / (Serbia) Boris Pašanski (first round)
4. (Czech Republic) Jaroslav Pospíšil / (Brazil) Márcio Torres (semifinals)

== Draw ==
=== Key ===
- Q = Qualifier
- WC = Wild card
- LL = Lucky loser
- Alt = Alternate
- SE = Special exempt
- PR = Protected ranking
- ITF = ITF entry
- JE = Junior exempt
- w/o = Walkover
- r = Retired
- d = Defaulted
- SR = Special ranking

=== Draw ===
First round
1	(Spain) R Ramírez Hidalgo (Spain) S Ventura	7	6
(Canada) V Pospisil (United States) K Van't Hof	6^{5}	3
WC	(Poland) J Janowicz (Slovakia) M Mečíř Jr.	3	2
(Belgium) N Desein (France) S Robert	6	6
4	(Czech Republic) J Pospíšil (Brazil) M Torres	6	6
(Argentina) J-P Amado (Italy) G Petrazzuolo	2	0
(Czech Republic) J Hájek (Czech Republic) D Karol	6	4	[9]
(Slovakia) K Čapkovič (Austria) A Haider-Maurer	4	6	[11]
(Argentina) M Alund (Romania) A Ungur	1	4
WC	(Slovakia) D Hrbatý (Slovakia) M Kližan	6	6
(Spain) MÁ López Jaén (Brazil) J Souza	4	7	[10]
3	(Russia) D Matsukevich (Serbia) B Pašanski	6	6^{4}	[6]
(Kazakhstan) Y Schukin (Russia) D Sitak	5	7	[11]
WC	(Slovakia) A Martin (Slovakia) M Semjan	7	6^{8}	[9]
(Argentina) D Álvarez (Argentina) JP Brzezicki	7	2	[10]
2	(Spain) D Marrero (Spain) P Santos	6^{3}	6	[6]

Quarterfinals
1	(Spain) R Ramírez Hidalgo (Spain) S Ventura
(Belgium) N Desein (France) S Robert	w/o
4	(Czech Republic) J Pospíšil (Brazil) M Torres
(Slovakia) K Čapkovič (Austria) A Haider-Maurer	w/o
WC	(Slovakia) D Hrbatý (Slovakia) M Kližan	6	4	[10]
(Spain) MÁ López Jaén (Brazil) J Souza	3	6	[7]
(Kazakhstan) Y Schukin (Russia) D Sitak	2	2
(Argentina) D Álvarez (Argentina) JP Brzezicki	6	6

Semifinals
1	(Spain) R Ramírez Hidalgo (Spain) S Ventura	2	6	[10]
4	(Czech Republic) J Pospíšil (Brazil) M Torres	6	3	[7]
WC	(Slovakia) D Hrbatý (Slovakia) M Kližan	6	6
(Argentina) D Álvarez (Argentina) JP Brzezicki	1	3

Finals
1	(Spain) R Ramírez Hidalgo (Spain) S Ventura	6	7
WC	(Slovakia) D Hrbatý (Slovakia) M Kližan	2	6^{5}
