= 2010 Astana Cup – Doubles =

Doubles
- 2010 Astana Cup

Final
- Champions: (Russia) Mikhail Elgin (Austria) Nikolaus Moser
- Runners-up: (China) Wu Di (China) Zhang Ze
- Score: 6–0, 6–4

Events
Singles	Doubles
← 2009 ·	Astana Cup	· 2011 →

Jonathan Marray and Jamie Murray were the defending champions but decided not to participate.
Mikhail Elgin and Nikolaus Moser won the title, defeating Wu Di and Zhang Ze 6–0, 6–4 in the finals.

== Seeds ==
The top two seeds received a bye into the first round.

1. (Australia) Sadik Kadir / (India) Purav Raja (semifinals)
2. (Russia) Mikhail Elgin / (Austria) Nikolaus Moser
3. (Japan) Hiroki Kondo / (Japan) Junn Mitsuhashi (first round)
4. (Australia) Samuel Groth / (Kazakhstan) Alexey Kedryuk (quarterfinals)

== Draw ==
=== Key ===
- Q = Qualifier
- WC = Wild card
- LL = Lucky loser
- Alt = Alternate
- SE = Special exempt
- PR = Protected ranking
- ITF = ITF entry
- JE = Junior exempt
- w/o = Walkover
- r = Retired
- d = Defaulted
- SR = Special ranking

=== Draw ===
First round
(Argentina) J-M Valverde (South Korea) D Yoo	6	6
(Kazakhstan) D Braun (Kazakhstan) S Yessenbekov	2	2
3	(Japan) H Kondo (Japan) J Mitsuhashi	4	2
(Russia) A Kumantsov (France) L Walter	6	6
WC	(Uzbekistan) A Asanov (Kazakhstan) A Saranchukov	2	5
(China) D Wu (China) Z Zhang	6	7
(Slovakia) A Martin (Slovakia) M Mečíř Jr.	6	4	[10]
(Russia) D Matsukevich (Russia) A Sitak	4	6	[8]
(Czech Republic) J Minář (Slovakia) M Semjan	6	3	[5]
4	(Australia) S Groth (Kazakhstan) A Kedryuk	4	6	[10]
(New Zealand) J Statham (Israel) A Weintraub	2	6	[9]
(China) M-X Gong (China) Z Li	6	3	[11]

Quarterfinals
1	(Australia) S Kadir (India) P Raja	6	6
(Argentina) J-M Valverde (South Korea) D Yoo	2	1
(Russia) A Kumantsov (France) L Walter	4	7	[7]
(China) D Wu (China) Z Zhang	6	5	[10]
(Slovakia) A Martin (Slovakia) M Mečíř Jr.	2	6	[11]
4	(Australia) S Groth (Kazakhstan) A Kedryuk	6	3	[9]
(China) M-X Gong (China) Z Li	4	2
2	(Russia) M Elgin (Austria) N Moser	6	6

Semifinals
1	(Australia) S Kadir (India) P Raja	1	3
(China) D Wu (China) Z Zhang	6	6
(Slovakia) A Martin (Slovakia) M Mečíř Jr.	2	6^{3}
2	(Russia) M Elgin (Austria) N Moser	6	7

Finals
(China) D Wu (China) Z Zhang	0	4
2	(Russia) M Elgin (Austria) N Moser	6	6
