= 2010 Astana Cup =

- Date: August 23–29
- Edition: 1st
- Surface: Hard
- Location: Astana, Kazakhstan

Champions

Singles
- (Russia) Igor Kunitsyn

Doubles
- (Russia) Mikhail Elgin / (Austria) Nikolaus Moser
Astana Cup	· 2011 →

The 2010 Astana Cup was a professional tennis tournament played on outdoor hard courts. It was the first edition of the tournament which was part of the 2010 ATP Challenger Tour. It took place in Astana, Kazakhstan between 23 and 29 August 2010.

== ATP entrants ==
=== Seeds ===
Nationality	Player	Ranking*	Seeding
RUS	Igor Kunitsyn	117	1
RUS	Konstantin Kravchuk	152	2
SVK	Andrej Martin	210	3
SVK	Marek Semjan	240	4
RUS	Andrey Kumantsov	302	5
RUS	Artem Sitak	315	6
CZE	Jan Minář	318	7
CHN	Zhang Ze	327	8

- Rankings are as of August 16, 2010.

=== Other entrants ===
The following players received wildcards into the singles main draw:

- (India) Yuki Bhambri
- (Kazakhstan) Anton Saranchukov
- (Kazakhstan) Serizhan Yessenbekov

The following players received a special exempt into the singles main draw:

- (New Zealand) Michael Venus

The following players received entry from the qualifying draw:

- (Australia) Samuel Groth
- (Australia) Sadik Kadir
- (Russia) Denis Matsukevich
- (Austria) Nikolaus Moser

The following players received entry as a lucky loser from the qualifying draw:

- (Israel) Gilad Ben Zvi
- (Russia) Mikhail Elgin

== Champions ==
=== Singles ===
(Russia) Igor Kunitsyn def. (Russia) Konstantin Kravchuk, 4–6, 7–6(5), 7–6(3)

=== Doubles ===
(Russia) Mikhail Elgin / (Austria) Nikolaus Moser def. (China) Wu Di / (China) Zhang Ze, 6–0, 6–4
