= 2012 Košice Open – Doubles =

Doubles
- 2012 Košice Open
- 2011 Champions: (Germany) Simon Greul (Germany) Bastian Knittel

Final
- Champions: (Poland) Tomasz Bednarek (Poland) Mateusz Kowalczyk
- Runners-up: (Belarus) Uladzimir Ignatik (Belarus) Andrei Vasilevski
- Score: 6-2, 5-7, [14–12]

Events
| Singles | Doubles |
| ← 2011 · | Košice Open | · 2013 → |

Simon Greul and Bastian Knittel were the defending champions but decided not to participate.

== Seeds ==
1. (United States) Travis Parrott / (Slovakia) Igor Zelenay (first round)
2. (United States) Nicholas Monroe / (Germany) Simon Stadler (semifinals)
3. (Poland) Tomasz Bednarek / (Poland) Mateusz Kowalczyk (champions)
4. (Belarus) Uladzimir Ignatik / (Belarus) Andrei Vasilevski (runners-up)

== Draw ==
=== Key ===
- Q = Qualifier
- WC = Wild card
- LL = Lucky loser
- Alt = Alternate
- SE = Special exempt
- PR = Protected ranking
- ITF = ITF entry
- JE = Junior exempt
- w/o = Walkover
- r = Retired
- d = Defaulted
- SR = Special ranking

=== Draw ===
First round
1 | (United States) T Parrott (Slovakia) I Zelenay | 3 | 1
(Portugal) G Elias (Portugal) J Sousa | 6 | 6
WC | (Slovakia) Juraj Šimčák (Slovakia) Dominik Šproch | w/o
(Poland) M Gawron (Czech Republic) I Minář
4 | (Belarus) U Ignatik (Belarus) A Vasilevski | 7 | 6
WC | (Slovakia) Norbert Gomboš (Slovakia) Jozef Kovalík | 5 | 4
(Spain) A Brugués Davi (Dominican Republic) V Estrella | 3 | 2
(Finland) H Heliövaara (Germany) A Satschko | 6 | 6
(Slovakia) P Červenák (Canada) P Polansky | 7^{7} | 4 | [7]
(Slovenia) A Bedene (Slovakia) A Martin | 6^{5} | 6 | [10]
WC | (Slovakia) Patrik Fabian (Czech Republic) J Veselý | 6 | 1 | [8]
3 | (Poland) T Bednarek (Poland) M Kowalczyk | 3 | 6 | [10]
(Romania) A Dăescu (Romania) F Mergea | 6^{5} | 6 | [10]
(Uruguay) M Felder (Argentina) A Velotti | 7^{7} | 4 | [7]
(Romania) M Copil (Romania) V Crivoi | 3 | 2
2 | (United States) N Monroe (Germany) S Stadler | 6 | 6

Quarterfinals
(Portugal) G Elias (Portugal) J Sousa | w/o
WC | (Slovakia) Juraj Šimčák (Slovakia) Dominik Šproch
4 | (Belarus) U Ignatik (Belarus) A Vasilevski | 6 | 6
(Finland) H Heliövaara (Germany) A Satschko | 4 | 4
(Slovenia) A Bedene (Slovakia) A Martin | 5 | 6^{4}
3 | (Poland) T Bednarek (Poland) M Kowalczyk | 7 | 7^{7}
(Romania) A Dăescu (Romania) F Mergea | 3 | 1
2 | (United States) N Monroe (Germany) S Stadler | 6 | 6

Semifinals
WC | (Slovakia) Juraj Šimčák (Slovakia) Dominik Šproch | 1 | 1
4 | (Belarus) U Ignatik (Belarus) A Vasilevski | 6 | 6
3 | (Poland) T Bednarek (Poland) M Kowalczyk | 6 | 6
2 | (United States) N Monroe (Germany) S Stadler | 4 | 4

Final
4 | (Belarus) U Ignatik (Belarus) A Vasilevski | 2 | 7 | [12]
3 | (Poland) T Bednarek (Poland) M Kowalczyk | 6 | 5 | [14]
