= 2013 Košice Open – Singles =

Singles
- 2013 Košice Open

Final
- Champion: (Kazakhstan) Mikhail Kukushkin
- Runner-up: (Bosnia and Herzegovina) Damir Džumhur
- Score: 6–4, 1–6, 6–2

Events
Singles	Doubles
- Košice Open

Aljaž Bedene was the defending champion but chose to compete in the 2013 Aegon Championships instead.
Mikhail Kukushkin won the title defeating Damir Džumhur in the final, 6–4, 1–6, 6–2.

== Seeds ==
1. (Czech Republic) Jan Hájek (first round)
2. (Romania) Adrian Ungur (first round)
3. (Portugal) João Sousa (second round)
4. (Russia) Teymuraz Gabashvili (first round)
5. (Tunisia) Malek Jaziri (first round)
6. (Slovakia) Andrej Martin (quarterfinals)
7. (Ukraine) Ivan Sergeyev (first round)
8. (Croatia) Antonio Veić (quarterfinals)

== Draw ==
Key

- Q = Qualifier
- WC = Wild card
- LL = Lucky loser
- Alt = Alternate
- ITF = ITF entry
- PR = Protected ranking
- SR = Special ranking
- SE = Special exempt
- JE = Junior exempt
- JR = Junior Accelerator Programme entrant
- CO = College Accelerator Programme entrant
- NG = Next Gen Accelerator Program entrant
- w/o = Walkover
- r = Retired
- d = Defaulted

=== Finals ===
Semifinals
(Moldova) Radu Albot	6	2	4
Q	(Bosnia and Herzegovina) Damir Džumhur	1	6	6
(Kazakhstan) Mikhail Kukushkin	6	2
(Brazil) André Ghem	2	1^{r}

Final
Q	(Bosnia and Herzegovina) Damir Džumhur	4	6	2
(Kazakhstan) Mikhail Kukushkin	6	1	6

=== Top half ===
First round
1	(Czech Republic) J Hájek	2	4
(Switzerland) H Laaksonen	6	6
(Moldova) R Albot	6	6
WC	(Slovakia) Marco Daniš	2	1
Q	(Spain) C Gómez-Herrera	7	6
Q	(Ukraine) V Uzhylovskyi	5	0
(Italy) P Starace	2	0^{r}
6	(Slovakia) A Martin	6	3
3	(Portugal) J Sousa	6	6
(Brazil) F de Paula	2	0
(United States) T Sandgren	2	2
Q	(Bosnia and Herzegovina) D Džumhur	6	6
(Slovakia) M Semjan	4	6	3
(Germany) D Meffert	6	4	6
(Colombia) JC Campozano	6	6
7	(Ukraine) I Sergeyev	1	1

Second round
(Switzerland) H Laaksonen	2	3
(Moldova) R Albot	6	6
Q	(Spain) C Gómez-Herrera	7^{7}	2	4
6	(Slovakia) A Martin	6^{4}	6	6
3	(Portugal) J Sousa	0	4
Q	(Bosnia and Herzegovina) D Džumhur	6	6
(Germany) D Meffert	6	4
(Colombia) JC Campozano	4	6	6

Quarterfinals
(Moldova) R Albot	6	6
6	(Slovakia) A Martin	1	4
Q	(Bosnia and Herzegovina) D Džumhur	6	6
(Colombia) JC Campozano	4	1

Semifinals
(Moldova) R Albot	6	2	4
Q	(Bosnia and Herzegovina) D Džumhur	1	6	6

=== Bottom half ===
First round
8	(Croatia) A Veić	7^{10}	6
WC	(Czech Republic) A Pavalásek	6^{8}	3
(Romania) V Crivoi	5	4
(Austria) G Melzer	7	6
(Italy) A Giannessi	4	4
(Brazil) G Clezar	6	6
(Kazakhstan) M Kukushkin	3	6	7^{7}
4	(Russia) T Gabashvili	6	3	6^{5}
5	(Tunisia) M Jaziri	1	0^{r}
WC	(Slovakia) M Mečíř Jr.	6	3
(Chile) H Podlipnik Castillo	6	3	3
(Bosnia and Herzegovina) A Šetkić	4	6	6
Q	(Austria) M Neuchrist	6	6
WC	(Serbia) D Djokovic	2	1
(Brazil) A Ghem	6	2	6
2	(Romania) A Ungur	1	6	1

Second round
8	(Croatia) A Veić	2	6	6
(Austria) G Melzer	6	3	1
(Brazil) G Clezar	0	2
(Kazakhstan) M Kukushkin	6	6
WC	(Slovakia) M Mečíř Jr.	6	6
(Bosnia and Herzegovina) A Šetkić	4	4
Q	(Austria) M Neuchrist	5	1
(Brazil) A Ghem	7	6

Quarterfinals
8	(Croatia) A Veić	2	4
(Kazakhstan) M Kukushkin	6	6
WC	(Slovakia) M Mečíř Jr.	2	6	5
(Brazil) A Ghem	6	3	7

Semifinals
(Kazakhstan) M Kukushkin	6	2
(Brazil) A Ghem	2	1^{r}
