= 2011 Košice Open – Singles =

Singles
- 2011 Košice Open

Final
- Champion: (Germany) Simon Greul
- Runner-up: (Romania) Victor Crivoi
- Score: 6–2, 6–1

Events
Singles	Doubles
← 2010 ·	Košice Open	· 2012 →

Rubén Ramírez Hidalgo was the defending champion; however, he lost to Evgeny Donskoy in the second round.

Simon Greul won the final against Victor Crivoi 6–2, 6–1.

== Seeds ==
1. (Spain) Rubén Ramírez Hidalgo (second round)
2. (Portugal) Rui Machado (first round)
3. (Czech Republic) Lukáš Rosol (semifinals)
4. (Czech Republic) Ivo Minář (first round, retired)
5. (Germany) Simon Greul (champion)
6. (Argentina) Brian Dabul (first round)
7. (France) David Guez (quarterfinals)
8. (Kazakhstan) Yuri Schukin (first round)

== Draw ==
=== Key ===
- Q = Qualifier
- WC = Wild card
- LL = Lucky loser
- Alt = Alternate
- SE = Special exempt
- PR = Protected ranking
- ITF = ITF entry
- JE = Junior exempt
- w/o = Walkover
- r = Retired
- d = Defaulted
- SR = Special ranking

=== Finals ===
Semifinals
(Russia) Evgeny Donskoy	3	5
5	(Germany) Simon Greul	6	7
3	(Czech Republic) Lukáš Rosol	4	3
(Romania) Victor Crivoi	6	6

Final
5	(Germany) Simon Greul	6	6
(Romania) Victor Crivoi	2	1

=== Top half ===
First round
1	(Spain) R Ramírez Hidalgo	6	6
WC	(Slovakia) Marko Daniš	1	2
(Brazil) J Silva	6^{3}	1
(Russia) E Donskoy	7	6
Q	(Italy) Andrea Arnaboldi	6	7
WC	(Slovakia) M Mečíř Jr.	2	6^{2}
(Italy) M Viola	1	6	6
6	(Argentina) B Dabul	6	4	3
4	(Czech Republic) I Minář	7	6^{9}	0^{r}
(Argentina) F Bagnis	6^{3}	7	4
Q	(United States) W Odesnik	6	6
(France) A Gensse	1	0
(France) M Teixeira	2	6	0
SE	(Portugal) J Sousa	6	2	6
(Argentina) E Schwank	0	6^{4}
5	(Germany) S Greul	6	7

Second round
1	(Spain) R Ramírez Hidalgo	4	6	4
(Russia) E Donskoy	6	4	6
Q	(Italy) Andrea Arnaboldi	7	6
(Italy) M Viola	5	4
(Argentina) F Bagnis	2	2
Q	(United States) W Odesnik	6	6
SE	(Portugal) J Sousa	5	2
5	(Germany) S Greul	7	6

Quarterfinals
(Russia) E Donskoy	6	3	6
Q	(Italy) Andrea Arnaboldi	2	6	2
Q	(United States) W Odesnik	7	5	5
5	(Germany) S Greul	6^{5}	7	7

Semifinals
(Russia) E Donskoy	3	5
5	(Germany) S Greul	6	7

=== Bottom half ===
First round
7	(France) D Guez	6	6
(Slovakia) A Martin	4	3
(Spain) D Muñoz de la Nava	1	4
(Argentina) A Molteni	6	6
(Germany) B Knittel	2	3
(Czech Republic) D Lojda	6	6
Q	(Brazil) L Kirche	4	6	0
3	(Czech Republic) L Rosol	6	2	6
8	(Kazakhstan) Y Schukin	6^{1}	6	3
SE	(Germany) Jan-Lennard Struff	7	3	6
WC	(Slovakia) D Hrbatý	6	6
Q	(Spain) J Martí	1	1
(Spain) G Olaso	6	6
WC	(Czech Republic) Martin Přikryl	2	2
(Romania) V Crivoi	6	6
2	(Portugal) R Machado	2	2

Second round
7	(France) D Guez	7	6
(Argentina) A Molteni	6^{5}	4
(Czech Republic) D Lojda	6	3	6^{8}
3	(Czech Republic) L Rosol	3	6	7
SE	(Germany) Jan-Lennard Struff	3	3
WC	(Slovakia) D Hrbatý	6	6
(Spain) G Olaso	3	6^{4}
(Romania) V Crivoi	6	7

Quarterfinals
7	(France) D Guez	4	3
3	(Czech Republic) L Rosol	6	6
WC	(Slovakia) D Hrbatý	6^{4}	5
(Romania) V Crivoi	7	7

Semifinals
3	(Czech Republic) L Rosol	4	3
(Romania) V Crivoi	6	6
