= 2010 Košice Open – Doubles =

Doubles
- 2010 Košice Open

Final
- Champion: (Slovakia) Miloslav Mečíř Jr. (Slovakia) Marek Semjan
- Runner-up: (Brazil) Ricardo Hocevar (Brazil) Caio Zampieri
- Score: 3–6, 6–1, [13–11]

Events
Singles	Doubles
← 2009 ·	Košice Open	· 2011 →

Rubén Ramírez Hidalgo and Santiago Ventura were the defending champions, but they chose not to compete this year.
Miloslav Mečíř Jr. and Marek Semjan won in final 3–6, 6–1, [13–11] against Hocevar and Zampieri.

== Seeds ==
1. (Poland) Tomasz Bednarek / (Poland) Mateusz Kowalczyk (semifinals)
2. (Spain) Carles Poch-Gradin / (Spain) Pablo Santos (semifinals)
3. (Slovakia) Martin Kližan / (Kazakhstan) Yuri Schukin (quarterfinals)
4. (Brazil) Ricardo Hocevar / (Brazil) Caio Zampieri (final)

== Draw ==
=== Key ===
- Q = Qualifier
- WC = Wild card
- LL = Lucky loser
- Alt = Alternate
- SE = Special exempt
- PR = Protected ranking
- ITF = ITF entry
- JE = Junior exempt
- w/o = Walkover
- r = Retired
- d = Defaulted
- SR = Special ranking

=== Draw ===
First round
1	(Poland) T Bednarek (Poland) M Kowalczyk	6	7
(Chile) J Aguilar (Chile) P Capdeville	4	5
WC	(Slovakia) J Šimčák (Slovakia) R Tomaško	1	2
WC	(Italy) F Fognini (Spain) Ó Serrano	6	6
4	(Brazil) R Hocevar (Brazil) C Zampieri	7	6
(Romania) V Crivoi (Czech Republic) L Rosol	6^{0}	4
WC	(Spain) Ó Hernández (Spain) M Roy	7	7
(Slovakia) M Pažický (Slovakia) Adrian Sikora	5	6^{9}
(France) J Dasnières de Veigy (France) L Recouderc	2	6^{10}
(Slovakia) M Mečíř Jr. (Slovakia) M Semjan	6	7
(Russia) A Lobkov (Czech Republic) M Přikryl	1	1
3	(Slovakia) M Kližan (Kazakhstan) Y Schukin	6	6
(Ukraine) A Smirnov (Estonia) J Zopp	6	4	[10]
(Kazakhstan) M Kukushkin (Russia) D Sitak	3	6	[7]
(Slovakia) K Čapkovič (Slovakia) A Martin	1	5
2	(Spain) C Poch-Gradin (Spain) P Santos	6	7

Quarterfinals
1	(Poland) T Bednarek (Poland) M Kowalczyk	w/o
WC	(Italy) F Fognini (Spain) Ó Serrano
4	(Brazil) R Hocevar (Brazil) C Zampieri	6	6
WC	(Spain) Ó Hernández (Spain) M Roy	4	3
(Slovakia) M Mečíř Jr. (Slovakia) M Semjan	6	2	[10]
3	(Slovakia) M Kližan (Kazakhstan) Y Schukin	4	6	[8]
(Ukraine) A Smirnov (Estonia) J Zopp	6^{5}	7	[5]
2	(Spain) C Poch-Gradin (Spain) P Santos	7	5	[10]

Semifinals
1	(Poland) T Bednarek (Poland) M Kowalczyk	4	0
4	(Brazil) R Hocevar (Brazil) C Zampieri	6	6
(Slovakia) M Mečíř Jr. (Slovakia) M Semjan	4	7	[10]
2	(Spain) C Poch-Gradin (Spain) P Santos	6	5	[5]

Finals
4	(Brazil) R Hocevar (Brazil) C Zampieri	6	1	[11]
(Slovakia) M Mečíř Jr. (Slovakia) M Semjan	3	6	[13]
