= 2010 Košice Open =

- Date: June 7 – June 13
- Edition: 8th
- Location: Košice, Slovakia

Champions

Singles
- (Spain) Rubén Ramírez Hidalgo

Doubles
- (Slovakia) Miloslav Mečíř Jr. / (Slovakia) Marek Semjan
← 2009 ·	Košice Open	· 2011 →

The 2010 Košice Open was a professional tennis tournament played on outdoor red clay courts. It was part of the 2010 ATP Challenger Tour. It took place in Košice, Slovakia between 7 and 13 June 2010.

== ATP entrants ==
=== Seeds ===
Nationality	Player	Ranking*	Seeding
CZE	Jan Hájek	75	1
ITA	Fabio Fognini	92	2
ESP	Rubén Ramírez Hidalgo	120	3
ESP	Óscar Hernández	121	4
KAZ	Mikhail Kukushkin	135	5
FRA	David Guez	136	6
ROU	Victor Crivoi	158	7
GER	Dieter Kindlmann	162	8

- Rankings are as of May 24, 2010.

=== Other entrants ===
The following players received wildcards into the singles main draw:

- (Poland) Mateusz Kowalczyk
- (Slovakia) Andrej Martin
- (Slovakia) Miloslav Mečíř Jr.
- (Czech Republic) Martin Přikryl

The following players received entry from the qualifying draw:

- (Russia) Alexander Lobkov
- (Czech Republic) Jan Minář
- (Slovakia) Marek Semjan
- (Ukraine) Artem Smirnov

== Champions ==
=== Singles ===
(Spain) Rubén Ramírez Hidalgo def. (Serbia) Filip Krajinović 6–3, 6–2

=== Doubles ===
(Slovakia) Miloslav Mečíř Jr. / (Slovakia) Marek Semjan def. (Brazil) Ricardo Hocevar / (Brazil) Caio Zampieri, 3–6, 6–1, [13–11]
