= 2009 Košice Open – Singles =

Singles
- 2009 Košice Open

Final
- Champion: (France) Stéphane Robert
- Runner-up: (Czech Republic) Jiří Vaněk
- Score: 7–6(5), 7–6(5)

Events
Singles	Doubles
- Košice Open

Lukáš Rosol was the defending champion; however, he didn't participate this year.
Stéphane Robert won in the final 7–6(5), 7–6(5), against Jiří Vaněk.

== Seeds ==
1. (Spain) Santiago Ventura (second round)
2. (Spain) Rubén Ramírez Hidalgo (quarterfinals)
3. (Czech Republic) Jiří Vaněk (final)
4. (Spain) David Marrero (first round)
5. (Slovakia) Dominik Hrbatý (second round)
6. (Kazakhstan) Yuri Schukin (second round)
7. (Argentina) Juan Pablo Brzezicki (first round)
8. (Spain) Miguel Ángel López Jaén (semifinals)

== Draw ==
Key

- Q = Qualifier
- WC = Wild card
- LL = Lucky loser
- Alt = Alternate
- ITF = ITF entry
- PR = Protected ranking
- SR = Special ranking
- SE = Special exempt
- JE = Junior exempt
- JR = Junior Accelerator Programme entrant
- CO = College Accelerator Programme entrant
- NG = Next Gen Accelerator Program entrant
- w/o = Walkover
- r = Retired
- d = Defaulted

=== Final four ===
Semifinals
8	(Spain) Miguel Ángel López Jaén	4	7	1
(France) Stéphane Robert	6	5	6
3	(Czech Republic) Jiří Vaněk	3	6	6
(Serbia) Boris Pašanski	6	4	0

Final
(France) Stéphane Robert	7	7
3	(Czech Republic) Jiří Vaněk	6^{5}	6^{5}

=== Top half ===
First round
1	(Spain) S Ventura	6	6
(Italy) G Petrazzuolo	2	2
Q	(Slovakia) K Čapkovič	4	6	1
WC	(Slovakia) M Kližan	6	2	6
(Argentina) M Alund	4	2
Q	(Argentina) D Álvarez	6	6
(Belgium) N Desein	4	1
8	(Spain) MÁ López Jaén	6	6
4	(Spain) D Marrero	2	2
(Romania) A Ungur	6	6
WC	(Slovakia) M Mečíř Jr.	6	6^{7}	3
Q	(Hungary) Á Kellner	2	7	0^{r}
(Austria) A Haider-Maurer	4	3
(France) S Robert	6	6
(Spain) P Santos	6^{5}	4
5	(Slovakia) D Hrbatý	7	6

Second round
1	(Spain) S Ventura	4	0
WC	(Slovakia) M Kližan	6	6
Q	(Argentina) D Álvarez	1	6^{0}
8	(Spain) MÁ López Jaén	6	7
(Romania) A Ungur	6	6
WC	(Slovakia) M Mečíř Jr.	3	2
(France) S Robert	7	6
5	(Slovakia) D Hrbatý	6^{4}	4

Quarterfinals
WC	(Slovakia) M Kližan	6	6^{3}	1
8	(Spain) MÁ López Jaén	3	7	6
(Romania) A Ungur	6^{2}	2
(France) S Robert	7	6

Semifinals
8	(Spain) MÁ López Jaén	4	7	4
(France) S Robert	6	5	6

=== Bottom half ===
First round
6	(Kazakhstan) Y Schukin	6	2	6
(Germany) A Flock	2	6	4
SE	(Czech Republic) J Hájek	6	6
(Czech Republic) J Pospíšil	2	4
(Argentina) J-P Amado	3	2
(Croatia) A Veić	6	6
LL	(Slovakia) M Semjan	2	2
3	(Czech Republic) Jiří Vaněk	6	6
7	(Argentina) JP Brzezicki	0	5
WC	(Austria) N Reissig	6	7
(Brazil) J Souza	5	2
(Serbia) B Pašanski	7	6
(Netherlands) T de Bakker	7	6^{4}	7
WC	(Poland) J Janowicz	5	7	6^{5}
Q	(Ukraine) I Sergeyev	3	6	4
2	(Spain) R Ramírez Hidalgo	6	2	6

Second round
6	(Kazakhstan) Y Schukin	3	4
SE	(Czech Republic) J Hájek	6	6
(Croatia) A Veić	6	3	4
3	(Czech Republic) Jiří Vaněk	3	6	6
WC	(Austria) N Reissig	2	0
(Serbia) B Pašanski	6	6
(Netherlands) T de Bakker	4	6	1
2	(Spain) R Ramírez Hidalgo	6	2	6

Quarterfinals
SE	(Czech Republic) J Hájek	6^{7}	1
3	(Czech Republic) Jiří Vaněk	7	6
(Serbia) B Pašanski	6	6
2	(Spain) R Ramírez Hidalgo	4	3

Semifinals
3	(Czech Republic) Jiří Vaněk	3	6	6
(Serbia) B Pašanski	6	4	0
