= 2014 Košice Open – Singles =

Singles
- 2014 Košice Open

Final
- Champions: (Canada) Frank Dancevic
- Runners-up: (Slovakia) Norbert Gombos
- Score: 6–2, 3–6, 6–2

Events
Singles	Doubles
- Košice Open

Mikhail Kukushkin was the defending champion, but chose to compete in London instead.

Frank Dancevic won the title, defeating Norbert Gombos in the final, 6–2, 3–6, 6–2.

== Seeds ==
1. (Austria) Andreas Haider-Maurer (second round)
2. (Argentina) Facundo Argüello (quarterfinals)
3. (Romania) Adrian Ungur (second round)
4. (Bosnia and Herzegovina) Damir Džumhur (first round)
5. (Austria) Gerald Melzer (second round)
6. (Slovakia) Andrej Martin (second round)
7. (Slovakia) Norbert Gombos (final)
8. (United States) Wayne Odesnik (first round)

== Draw ==
Key

- Q = Qualifier
- WC = Wild card
- LL = Lucky loser
- Alt = Alternate
- ITF = ITF entry
- PR = Protected ranking
- SR = Special ranking
- SE = Special exempt
- JE = Junior exempt
- JR = Junior Accelerator Programme entrant
- CO = College Accelerator Programme entrant
- NG = Next Gen Accelerator Program entrant
- w/o = Walkover
- r = Retired
- d = Defaulted

=== Finals ===
Semifinals
Q	(Canada) Frank Dancevic	6	6
(France) Lucas Pouille	4	2
(Belarus) Uladzimir Ignatik	6	6^{3}	3
7	(Slovakia) Norbert Gombos	2	7^{7}	6

Final
Q	(Canada) Frank Dancevic	6	3	6
7	(Slovakia) Norbert Gombos	2	6	2

=== Top half ===
First round
1	(Austria) A Haider-Maurer	4	6	6
(Croatia) A Veić	6	0	2
WC	(Slovakia) Patrik Fabian	1	1
Q	(Canada) F Dancevic	6	6
(Bosnia and Herzegovina) A Šetkić	6	6
(Serbia) P Krstin	3	4
Q	(Poland) B Koniusz	4	6	6
8	(United States) W Odesnik	6	4	4
4	(Bosnia and Herzegovina) D Džumhur	6^{4}	3
(Ukraine) A Smirnov	7^{7}	6
(Moldova) R Albot	6	5	6
(Chile) H Podlipnik Castillo	3	7	2
(France) L Pouille	6	6
(France) TK Wang	2	4
(Germany) B Phau	1	0^{r}
5	(Austria) G Melzer	6	2

Second round
1	(Austria) A Haider-Maurer	4	2
Q	(Canada) F Dancevic	6	6
(Bosnia and Herzegovina) A Šetkić	7	3	6
Q	(Poland) B Koniusz	5	6	4
(Ukraine) A Smirnov	3	4
(Moldova) R Albot	6	6
(France) L Pouille	3	7	6
5	(Austria) G Melzer	6	5	1

Quarterfinals
Q	(Canada) F Dancevic	6	6
(Bosnia and Herzegovina) A Šetkić	1	3
(Moldova) R Albot	2	1
(France) L Pouille	6	6

Semifinals
Q	(Canada) F Dancevic	6	6
(France) L Pouille	4	2

=== Bottom half ===
First round
6	(Slovakia) A Martin	6	7^{7}
(Japan) Y Nishioka	1	6^{1}
(Brazil) A Ghem	6	6
WC	(Slovakia) Marko Daniš	4	0
(Belarus) U Ignatik	6	6
Q	(Slovakia) Michal Pažický	1	3
(Czech Republic) Michal Konečný	4	0
3	(Romania) A Ungur	6	6
7	(Slovakia) N Gombos	6	5	6
(Spain) D Muñoz de la Nava	3	7	4
WC	(Czech Republic) Robin Staněk	2	3
LL	(Brazil) F Neis	6	6
Q	(Poland) A Kapaś	6	6
WC	(Slovakia) Dominik Šproch	2	2
(United States) C Buchanan	5	7^{7}	4
2	(Argentina) F Argüello	7	6^{5}	6

Second round
6	(Slovakia) A Martin	3	1
(Brazil) A Ghem	6	6
(Belarus) U Ignatik	7	6
3	(Romania) A Ungur	5	2
7	(Slovakia) N Gombos	6	6
LL	(Brazil) F Neis	3	0
Q	(Poland) A Kapaś	6^{6}	3
2	(Argentina) F Argüello	7^{8}	6

Quarterfinals
(Brazil) A Ghem	3	6	2
(Belarus) U Ignatik	6	4	6
7	(Slovakia) N Gombos	7	6
2	(Argentina) F Argüello	5	3

Semifinals
(Belarus) U Ignatik	6	6^{3}	3
7	(Slovakia) N Gombos	2	7^{7}	6
