= 2012 Košice Open =

- Date: June 11–17
- Edition: 10th
- Surface: Clay
- Location: Košice, Slovakia

Champions

Singles
- (Slovenia) Aljaž Bedene

Doubles
- (Poland) Tomasz Bednarek / (Poland) Mateusz Kowalczyk
← 2011 ·	Košice Open	· 2013 →

The 2012 Košice Open was a professional tennis tournament played on clay courts. It was the tenth edition of the tournament which was part of the 2012 ATP Challenger Tour. It took place in Košice, Slovakia between 11 and 17 June 2012.

== ATP entrants ==
=== Seeds ===
Country	Player	Rank^{1}	Seed
ITA	Alessandro Giannessi	126	1
CZE	Jan Hájek	128	2
POR	João Sousa	137	3
SVN	Aljaž Bedene	138	4
FRA	Augustin Gensse	143	5
AUT	Andreas Haider-Maurer	155	6
TPE	Yang Tsung-hua	167	7
ESP	Arnau Brugués-Davi	178	8

- ^{1} Rankings are as of May 28, 2012.

=== Other entrants ===
The following players received wildcards into the singles main draw:

- (Slovakia) Patrik Fabian
- (Slovakia) Dominik Hrbatý
- (Slovakia) Miloslav Mečíř Jr.
- (Czech Republic) Jiří Veselý

The following players received entry from the qualifying draw:

- (Romania) Marius Copil
- (Poland) Marcin Gawron
- (Germany) Nils Langer
- (Slovakia) Andrej Martin

== Champions ==
=== Singles ===
- (Slovenia) Aljaž Bedene def. (Germany) Simon Greul, 7–6^{(7–1)}, 6–2

=== Doubles ===
- (Poland) Tomasz Bednarek / (Poland) Mateusz Kowalczyk def. (Belarus) Uladzimir Ignatik / (Belarus) Andrei Vasilevski, 2–6, 7–5, [14–12]
