= 2010 President's Cup – Singles =

Singles
- 2010 President's Cup

Final
- Champion: (Croatia) Ivan Dodig
- Runner-up: (Russia) Igor Kunitsyn
- Score: 6–4, 6–3

Events
Singles	Doubles
- President's Cup

Igor Kunitsyn, who was last year's winner, reached the final, however he lost to Ivan Dodig 4–6, 3–6.

== Seeds ==
1. (Kazakhstan) Mikhail Kukushkin (first round)
2. (Germany) Björn Phau (second round)
3. (Germany) Rainer Schüttler (semifinals)
4. (Russia) Igor Kunitsyn (final)
5. (Croatia) Ivan Dodig (champion)
6. (Austria) Martin Fischer (second round)
7. (Russia) Konstantin Kravchuk (semifinals)
8. (Russia) Alexander Kudryavtsev (quarterfinals)

== Draw ==
Key

- Q = Qualifier
- WC = Wild card
- LL = Lucky loser
- Alt = Alternate
- ITF = ITF entry
- PR = Protected ranking
- SR = Special ranking
- SE = Special exempt
- JE = Junior exempt
- JR = Junior Accelerator Programme entrant
- CO = College Accelerator Programme entrant
- NG = Next Gen Accelerator Program entrant
- w/o = Walkover
- r = Retired
- d = Defaulted

=== Finals ===
Semifinals
7	(Russia) Konstantin Kravchuk	6	4	5
4	(Russia) Igor Kunitsyn	4	6	7
3	(Germany) Rainer Schüttler	3	6	2
5	(Croatia) Ivan Dodig	6	3	6

Final
4	(Russia) Igor Kunitsyn	4	3
5	(Croatia) Ivan Dodig	6	6

=== Top half ===
First round
1	(Kazakhstan) M Kukushkin	6	6^{5}	5
(Austria) P Oswald	0	7	7
Q	(Russia) D Matsukevich	6	6
Q	(Russia) V Reshetnikov	3	1
(Russia) M Elgin	6	6
(Ukraine) I Sergeyev	1	2
WC	(Kazakhstan) S Yessenbekov	0	1
7	(Russia) K Kravchuk	6	6
4	(Russia) I Kunitsyn	6	3	6
Q	(Romania) P-A Luncanu	4	6	3
(Latvia) A Juška	6	6
(Israel) H Levy	2	1
(Russia) I Belyaev	6^{4}	6	6
(Russia) E Kirillov	7	4	4
(Belarus) U Ignatik	6	4	5
6	(Austria) M Fischer	1	6	7

Second round
(Austria) P Oswald	6	5	2
Q	(Russia) D Matsukevich	3	7	6
(Russia) M Elgin	2	4
7	(Russia) K Kravchuk	6	6
4	(Russia) I Kunitsyn	7	6
(Latvia) A Juška	6^{5}	3
(Russia) I Belyaev	6	6
6	(Austria) M Fischer	2	4

Quarterfinals
Q	(Russia) D Matsukevich	2	5
7	(Russia) K Kravchuk	6	7
4	(Russia) I Kunitsyn	6	2	6
(Russia) I Belyaev	2	6	4

Semifinals
7	(Russia) K Kravchuk	6	4	5
4	(Russia) I Kunitsyn	4	6	7

=== Bottom half ===
First round
8	(Russia) A Kudryavtsev	4	6	6
WC	(Thailand) D Udomchoke	6	4	3
(Australia) R Junaid	6	3	6
(Austria) A Peya	4	6	3
(Spain) G Olaso	3	3
WC	(Kazakhstan) D Braun	6	6
WC	(Russia) E Donskoy	3	7	5
3	(Germany) R Schüttler	6	6^{3}	7
5	(Croatia) I Dodig	6	6^{5}	6
(Slovakia) M Mečíř Jr.	4	7	4
(Slovakia) M Semjan	6	3	5
(Germany) S Stadler	3	6	7
(Croatia) N Mektić	6	6
(Russia) A Kuznetsov	3	3
Q	(Russia) M Ledovskikh	6	6^{2}	2
2	(Germany) B Phau	3	7	6

Second round
8	(Russia) A Kudryavtsev	5	7	6
(Australia) R Junaid	7	6^{6}	2
WC	(Kazakhstan) D Braun	2	2
3	(Germany) R Schüttler	6	6
5	(Croatia) I Dodig	6	3	6
(Germany) S Stadler	3	6	1
(Croatia) N Mektić	6	6
2	(Germany) B Phau	3	4

Quarterfinals
8	(Russia) A Kudryavtsev	6^{5}	2
3	(Germany) R Schüttler	7	6
5	(Croatia) I Dodig	6	6
(Croatia) N Mektić	3	2

Semifinals
3	(Germany) R Schüttler	3	6	2
5	(Croatia) I Dodig	6	3	6
