= 2014 Košice Open – Doubles =

Doubles
- 2014 Košice Open

Final
- Champion: (Argentina) Facundo Argüello (Uruguay) Ariel Behar
- Runner-up: (Poland) Andriej Kapaś (Poland) Błażej Koniusz
- Score: 6–4, 7–6^{(7–4)}

Events
Singles	Doubles
- Košice Open

Kamil Čapkovič and Igor Zelenay were the defending champions, but decided not to compete.

Facundo Argüello and Ariel Behar won the title, defeating Andriej Kapaś and Błażej Koniusz in the final, 6–4, 7–6^{(7–4)}.

== Seeds ==
1. (Poland) Mateusz Kowalczyk / (New Zealand) Artem Sitak (semifinals)
2. (Austria) Sebastian Bader / (Austria) Gerald Melzer (semifinals)
3. (Argentina) Facundo Argüello / (Uruguay) Ariel Behar (champions)
4. (Poland) Andriej Kapaś / (Poland) Błażej Koniusz (final)

== Draw ==
Key

- Q = Qualifier
- WC = Wild card
- LL = Lucky loser
- Alt = Alternate
- ITF = ITF entry
- PR = Protected ranking
- SR = Special ranking
- SE = Special exempt
- JE = Junior exempt
- JR = Junior Accelerator Programme entrant
- CO = College Accelerator Programme entrant
- NG = Next Gen Accelerator Program entrant
- w/o = Walkover
- r = Retired
- d = Defaulted

=== Draw ===
First round
1	(Poland) M Kowalczyk (New Zealand) A Sitak	6	6
(Czech Republic) Michal Konečný (Japan) Y Nishioka	1	2
(Canada) F Dancevic (Serbia) B Pašanski	6	6
WC	(Slovakia) Marko Daniš (Slovakia) Patrik Fabian	2	0
4	(Poland) A Kapaś (Poland) B Koniusz	7^{7}	7^{7}
(Romania) Alexandru-Daniel Carpen (Chile) H Podlipnik-Castillo	6^{4}	6^{3}
WC	(Slovakia) Filip Havaj (Slovakia) Juraj Šimčák	4	2
(Brazil) A Ghem (Brazil) F Neis	6	6
(Moldova) R Albot (Ukraine) A Smirnov	6^{6}	6	[8]
(Spain) D Muñoz de la Nava (United States) W Odesnik	7^{7}	4	[10]
(Slovakia) A Martin (Slovakia) I Zelenay	6^{6}	7^{7}	[15]
3	(Argentina) F Argüello (Uruguay) A Behar	7^{8}	6^{4}	[17]
(Belarus) U Ignatik (Bosnia and Herzegovina) A Šetkić	4	4
(Czech Republic) D Škoch (Czech Republic) Robin Staněk	6	6
WC	(Slovakia) Michal Pažický (Slovakia) Dominik Šproch	3	5
2	(Austria) S Bader (Austria) G Melzer	6	7

Quarterfinals
1	(Poland) M Kowalczyk (New Zealand) A Sitak	7^{9}	3	[10]
(Canada) F Dancevic (Serbia) B Pašanski	6^{7}	6	[2]
4	(Poland) A Kapaś (Poland) B Koniusz	6	6
(Brazil) A Ghem (Brazil) F Neis	4	3
(Spain) D Muñoz de la Nava (United States) W Odesnik	1	2
3	(Argentina) F Argüello (Uruguay) A Behar	6	6
(Czech Republic) D Škoch (Czech Republic) R Staněk	3	4
2	(Austria) S Bader (Austria) G Melzer	6	6

Semifinals
1	(Poland) M Kowalczyk (New Zealand) A Sitak	5	4
4	(Poland) A Kapaś (Poland) B Koniusz	7	6
3	(Argentina) F Argüello (Uruguay) A Behar	6	7
2	(Austria) S Bader (Austria) G Melzer	2	5

Final
4	(Poland) A Kapaś (Poland) B Koniusz	4	6^{4}
3	(Argentina) F Argüello (Uruguay) A Behar	6	7^{7}
