= 2014 Košice Open =

- Date: 9–14 June
- Edition: 12th
- Draw: 32S / 16D
- Prize money: €30,000+H
- Surface: Clay
- Location: Košice, Slovakia

Champions

Singles
- (Canada) Frank Dancevic

Doubles
- (Argentina) Facundo Argüello / (Uruguay) Ariel Behar
- Košice Open

The 2014 Košice Open was a professional tennis tournament played on clay courts. It was the twelfth edition of the tournament which was part of the 2014 ATP Challenger Tour. It took place in Košice, Slovakia between 9 and 14 June 2014.

== Singles main-draw entrants ==
=== Seeds ===
Country	Player	Rank^{1}	Seed
AUT	Andreas Haider-Maurer	104	1
ARG	Facundo Argüello	114	2
ROU	Adrian Ungur	128	3
BIH	Damir Džumhur	129	4
AUT	Gerald Melzer	140	5
SVK	Andrej Martin	158	6
SVK	Norbert Gombos	166	7
USA	Wayne Odesnik	169	8

- ^{1} Rankings are as of May 26, 2014.

=== Other entrants ===
The following players received wildcards into the singles main draw:

- (Slovakia) Marko Daniš
- (Slovakia) Patrik Fabian
- (Slovakia) Dominik Šproch
- (Czech Republic) Robin Staněk

The following players received entry from the qualifying draw:

- (Canada) Frank Dancevic
- (Poland) Blazej Koniusz
- (Slovakia) Michal Pažický
- (Poland) Andriej Kapaś

== Doubles main-draw entrants ==
=== Seeds ===
Country	Player	Country	Player	Rank^{1}	Seed
POL	Mateusz Kowalczyk	NZL	Artem Sitak	234	1
AUT	Sebastian Bader	AUT	Gerald Melzer	433	2
ARG	Facundo Argüello	URU	Ariel Behar	461	3
POL	Andriej Kapaś	POL	Błażej Koniusz	484	4

- ^{1} Rankings as of May 26, 2014.

=== Other entrants ===
The following pairs received wildcards into the doubles main draw:

- (Slovakia) Marko Daniš / (Slovakia) Patrik Fabian
- (Slovakia) Filip Havaj / (Slovakia) Juraj Šimčák
- (Slovakia) Michal Pažický / (Slovakia) Dominik Šproch

== Champions ==
=== Singles ===
- (Canada) Frank Dancevic def. (Slovakia) Norbert Gombos, 6–2, 3–6, 6–2

=== Doubles ===
- (Argentina) Facundo Argüello / (Uruguay) Ariel Behar def. (Poland) Andriej Kapaś / (Poland) Błażej Koniusz, 6–4, 7–6^{(7–4)}
