= 2011 Košice Open =

- Date: June 7 – June 12
- Edition: 9th
- Location: Košice, Slovakia

Champions

Singles
- (Germany) Simon Greul

Doubles
- (Germany) Simon Greul / (Germany) Bastian Knittel
← 2010 ·	Košice Open	· 2012 →

The 2011 Košice Open was a professional tennis tournament played on outdoor red clay courts. It was part of the 2011 ATP Challenger Tour. It took place in Košice, Slovakia between 6 and 12 June 2011.

== ATP entrants ==
=== Seeds ===
Nationality	Player	Ranking*	Seeding
ESP	Rubén Ramírez Hidalgo	100	1
POR	Rui Machado	110	2
CZE	Lukáš Rosol	111	3
CZE	Ivo Minář	132	4
GER	Simon Greul	138	5
ARG	Brian Dabul	147	6
FRA	David Guez	156	7
KAZ	Yuri Schukin	159	8

- Rankings are as of May 23, 2011.

=== Other entrants ===
The following players received wildcards into the singles main draw:

- (Slovakia) Marko Daniš
- (Slovakia) Dominik Hrbatý
- (Slovakia) Miloslav Mečíř Jr.
- (Czech Republic) Martin Přikryl

The following players received entry into the singles main draw as a special exemption:

- (Portugal) João Sousa
- (Germany) Jan-Lennard Struff

The following players received entry from the qualifying draw:

- (Italy) Andrea Arnaboldi
- (Brazil) Leonardo Kirche
- (Spain) Javier Martí
- (United States) Wayne Odesnik

== Champions ==
=== Singles ===
(Germany) Simon Greul def. (Romania) Victor Crivoi, 6–2, 6–1

=== Doubles ===
(Germany) Simon Greul / (Germany) Bastian Knittel def. (Argentina) Facundo Bagnis / (Argentina) Eduardo Schwank, 2–6, 6–3, [11–9]
