= 2010 President's Cup =

2010 President's Cup may refer to:

- 2010 President's Cup (tennis)
- 2010 President's Cup (Maldives), football
