= 2011 Astana Cup – Doubles =

Doubles
- 2011 Astana Cup

Final
- Champions: (India) Karan Rastogi (India) Vishnu Vardhan
- Runners-up: (Finland) Harri Heliövaara (Ukraine) Denys Molchanov
- Score: 7–6^{(7–3)}, 2–6, [10–8]

Events
Singles	Doubles
← 2010 ·	Astana Cup	· 2012 →

Michail Elgin and Nikolaus Moser were the defending champions but Moser decided not to participate.
Elgin partnered up with Alexandre Kudryavtsev, but they were eliminated by Radu Albot and Artem Smirnov in the quarterfinals.

Karan Rastogi and Vishnu Vardhan won the title. They defeated 4th seeds Harri Heliövaara and Denys Molchanov 7–6^{(7–3)}, 2–6, [10–8] in the final.

== Seeds ==
1. (Russia) Michail Elgin / (Russia) Alexandre Kudryavtsev (quarterfinals)
2. (United States) John Paul Fruttero / (South Africa) Raven Klaasen (semifinals)
3. (Russia) Teymuraz Gabashvili / (Russia) Konstantin Kravchuk (quarterfinals)
4. (Finland) Harri Heliövaara / (Ukraine) Denys Molchanov (final)

== Draw ==
=== Key ===
- Q = Qualifier
- WC = Wild card
- LL = Lucky loser
- Alt = Alternate
- SE = Special exempt
- PR = Protected ranking
- ITF = ITF entry
- JE = Junior exempt
- w/o = Walkover
- r = Retired
- d = Defaulted
- SR = Special ranking

=== Draw ===
First round
1	(Russia) M Elgin (Russia) A Kudryavtsev	6	6
(Italy) R Ghedin (France) F Martin	3	4
WC	(Kazakhstan) Anton Saranchukov (Kazakhstan) D Yevseyev	3	2
(Moldova) R Albot (Ukraine) A Smirnov	6	6
3	(Russia) T Gabashvili (Russia) K Kravchuk	7	6
Alt	(Uzbekistan) S Ikramov (Uzbekistan) T Ismailov	5	4
(India) K Rastogi (India) V Vardhan	7	6
(Chinese Taipei) T Chen (Japan) H Moriya	5	2
WC	(India) Vijayant Malik (Kazakhstan) Serizhan Yessenbekov	2	2
(Russia) V Rudnev (Russia) D Sitak	6	6
WC	(Kazakhstan) Danjil Braun (Kazakhstan) Kairat Kosherov	2	1
4	(Finland) H Heliövaara (Ukraine) D Molchanov	6	6
(United Kingdom) D Cox (United Kingdom) J Milton	5	3
(Slovakia) A Martin (Czech Republic) J Minář	7	6
(Kazakhstan) A Kedryuk (Russia) Mikhail Vasiliev	4	4
2	(United States) JP Fruttero (South Africa) R Klaasen	6	6

Quarterfinals
1	(Russia) M Elgin (Russia) A Kudryavtsev	3	6	[8]
(Moldova) R Albot (Ukraine) A Smirnov	6	2	[10]
3	(Russia) T Gabashvili (Russia) K Kravchuk	6^{5}	6	[7]
(India) K Rastogi (India) V Vardhan	7^{7}	3	[10]
(Russia) V Rudnev (Russia) D Sitak
4	(Finland) H Heliövaara (Ukraine) D Molchanov	w/o
(Slovakia) A Martin (Czech Republic) J Minář	5	3
2	(United States) JP Fruttero (South Africa) R Klaasen	7	6

Semifinals
(Moldova) R Albot (Ukraine) A Smirnov	4	4
(India) K Rastogi (India) V Vardhan	6	6
4	(Finland) H Heliövaara (Ukraine) D Molchanov	4	6	[10]
2	(United States) JP Fruttero (South Africa) R Klaasen	6	3	[8]

Final
(India) K Rastogi (India) V Vardhan	7^{7}	2	[10]
4	(Finland) H Heliövaara (Ukraine) D Molchanov	6^{3}	6	[8]
