= 2009 Košice Open =

- Date: June 8 – June 14
- Edition: 7th
- Location: Košice, Slovakia

Champions

Singles
- (France) Stéphane Robert

Doubles
- (Spain) Rubén Ramírez Hidalgo / (Spain) Santiago Ventura
- Košice Open

The 2009 Košice Open was a professional tennis tournament played on outdoor red clay courts. It was part of the 2009 ATP Challenger Tour. It took place in Košice, Slovakia between 8 and 14 June 2009.

== Singles entrants ==
=== Seeds ===
Nationality	Player	Ranking*	Seeding
ESP	Santiago Ventura	122	1
ESP	Rubén Ramírez Hidalgo	126	2
CZE	Jiří Vaněk	155	3
ESP	David Marrero	164	4
SVK	Dominik Hrbatý	165	5
KAZ	Yuri Schukin	176	6
ARG	Juan Pablo Brzezicki	177	7
ESP	Miguel Ángel López Jaén	178	8

- Rankings are as of May 25, 2009.

=== Other entrants ===
The following players received wildcards into the singles main draw:

- (Poland) Jerzy Janowicz
- (Slovakia) Martin Kližan
- (Slovakia) Miloslav Mečíř Jr.
- (Austria) Nicolas Reissig

The following players received entry a special Exempt into the singles main draw:

- (Czech Republic) Jan Hájek

The following players received entry from the qualifying draw:

- (Argentina) Diego Álvarez
- (Slovakia) Kamil Čapkovič
- (Hungary) Ádám Kellner
- (Slovakia) Marek Semjan (as a Lucky loser)
- (Ukraine) Ivan Sergeyev

== Champions ==
=== Singles ===
(France) Stéphane Robert def. (Czech Republic) Jiří Vaněk, 7–6(5), 7–6(5)

=== Doubles ===
(Spain) Rubén Ramírez Hidalgo / (Spain) Santiago Ventura def. (Slovakia) Dominik Hrbatý / (Slovakia) Martin Kližan, 6–2, 7–6(5)
