= 2013 Košice Open – Doubles =

Doubles
- 2013 Košice Open

Final
- Champions: (Slovakia) Kamil Čapkovič (Slovakia) Igor Zelenay
- Runners-up: (Germany) Gero Kretschmer (Germany) Alexander Satschko
- Score: 6–4, 7–6^{(7–5)}

Events
Singles	Doubles
- Košice Open

Tomasz Bednarek and Mateusz Kowalczyk was the defending champions, but Bednarek chose not to compete. Kowalczyk decided to participate in Strabag Prague Open instead.

Kamil Čapkovič and Igor Zelenay defeated Gero Kretschmer and Alexander Satschko in the final.

== Seeds ==
1. (Germany) Dominik Meffert / (Germany) Philipp Oswald (first round)
2. (Brazil) André Ghem / (Italy) Stefano Ianni (first round)
3. (Brazil) Guilherme Clezar / (Brazil) Fabiano de Paula (first round)
4. (Slovakia) Kamil Čapkovič / (Slovakia) Igor Zelenay (final)

== Draw ==
Key

- Q = Qualifier
- WC = Wild card
- LL = Lucky loser
- Alt = Alternate
- ITF = ITF entry
- PR = Protected ranking
- SR = Special ranking
- SE = Special exempt
- JE = Junior exempt
- JR = Junior Accelerator Programme entrant
- CO = College Accelerator Programme entrant
- NG = Next Gen Accelerator Program entrant
- w/o = Walkover
- r = Retired
- d = Defaulted

=== Draw ===
First round
1	(Germany) D Meffert (Germany) P Oswald	6	4	[6]
(Bosnia and Herzegovina) A Šetkić (Croatia) A Veić	4	6	[10]
(Italy) A Giannessi (Portugal) J Sousa	6	3	[5]
(Ecuador) J César Campozano (Chile) H Podlipnik-Castillo	1	6	[10]
4	(Slovakia) K Čapkovič (Slovakia) I Zelenay	6	6
(Moldova) R Albot (Russia) T Gabashvili	4	3
WC	(Slovakia) Juraj Šimčák (Slovakia) Dominik Šproch	4	0
(Slovakia) I Klec (Slovakia) A Martin	6	6
(Austria) G Melzer (United States) T Sandgren	7	6
WC	(Slovakia) Marko Daniš (Slovakia) Patrik Fabian	5	3
Alt	(Kazakhstan) M Kukushkin (Ukraine) V Uzhylovskyi	6	6
3	(Brazil) G Clezar (Brazil) F de Paula	3	2
(Republic of Ireland) J Cluskey (United Kingdom) D Walsh	6	6
(Moldova) A Ciumac (Ukraine) I Sergeyev	3	1
PR	(Germany) G Kretschmer (Germany) A Satschko	6	6
2	(Brazil) A Ghem (Italy) S Ianni	3	3

Quarterfinals
(Bosnia and Herzegovina) A Šetkić (Croatia) A Veić	6	6
(Ecuador) J César Campozano (Chile) H Podlipnik-Castillo	2	0
4	(Slovakia) K Čapkovič (Slovakia) I Zelenay	1	7^{7}	[10]
(Slovakia) I Klec (Slovakia) A Martin	6	6^{3}	7
(Austria) G Melzer (United States) T Sandgren	6	3	[8]
(Kazakhstan) M Kukushkin (Ukraine) V Uzhylovskyi	2	6	10
(Republic of Ireland) J Cluskey (United Kingdom) D Walsh	0	2
PR	(Germany) G Kretschmer (Germany) A Satschko	6	6

Semifinals
(Bosnia and Herzegovina) A Šetkić (Croatia) A Veić	2	1
4	(Slovakia) K Čapkovič (Slovakia) I Zelenay	6	6
(Kazakhstan) M Kukushkin (Ukraine) V Uzhylovskyi	3	2
PR	(Germany) G Kretschmer (Germany) A Satschko	6	6

Final
4	(Slovakia) K Čapkovič (Slovakia) I Zelenay	6	7^{7}
PR	(Germany) G Kretschmer (Germany) A Satschko	4	6^{5}
