= 2011 Astana Cup =

Tennis tournament

- Date: 22–28 August
- Edition: 2nd
- Surface: Hard
- Location: Astana, Kazakhstan

Champions

Singles
- (Germany) Rainer Schüttler

Doubles
- (India) Karan Rastogi / (India) Vishnu Vardhan
← 2010 ·	Astana Cup	· 2012 →

The 2011 Astana Cup was a professional tennis tournament played on hard courts. It was the second edition of the tournament which was part of the 2011 ATP Challenger Tour. It took place in Astana, Kazakhstan between 22 and 28 August 2011.

== ATP entrants ==
=== Seeds ===
Country	Player	Rank^{1}	Seed
GER	Rainer Schüttler	125	1
RUS	Teymuraz Gabashvili	129	2
RUS	Alexander Kudryavtsev	161	3
RUS	Konstantin Kravchuk	171	4
SVK	Andrej Martin	249	5
RSA	Raven Klaasen	256	6
MDA	Radu Albot	267	7
FRA	Fabrice Martin	289	8

- ^{1} Rankings are as of August 15, 2011.

=== Other entrants ===
The following players received wildcards into the singles main draw:

- (India) Karan Rastogi
- (Kazakhstan) Anton Saranchukov
- (Kazakhstan) Serizhan Yessenbekov
- (Kazakhstan) Denis Yevseyev

The following players received entry from the qualifying draw:

- (Russia) Mikhail Elgin
- (Uzbekistan) Sarvar Ikramov
- (Egypt) Mohamed Safwat
- (United Kingdom) Alexander Ward

== Champions ==
=== Singles ===
(Germany) Rainer Schüttler def. (Russia) Teymuraz Gabashvili, 7–6^{(8–6)}, 4–6, 6–4

=== Doubles ===
(India) Karan Rastogi / (India) Vishnu Vardhan def. (Finland) Harri Heliövaara / (Ukraine) Denys Molchanov, 7–6^{(7–3)}, 2–6, [10–8]
