= 2010 President's Cup – Doubles =

Doubles
- 2010 President's Cup

Final
- Champions: (United Kingdom) Colin Fleming (United Kingdom) Ross Hutchins
- Runners-up: (Russia) Michail Elgin (Russia) Alexandre Kudryavtsev
- Score: 6–3, 7–6(10)

Events
Singles	Doubles
- President's Cup

Michail Elgin and Nikolaus Moser were the defending champions, but they chose to not compete together this time.
Moser played with Alexander Peya. They lost to Andis Juška and Alexey Kedryuk in the quarterfinals.
Elgin partnered with Alexandre Kudryavtsev and they reached the final, but lost 3–6, 6–7(10) to Colin Fleming and Ross Hutchins.

== Seeds ==
1. (United Kingdom) Colin Fleming / (United Kingdom) Ross Hutchins (champions)
2. (Australia) Rameez Junaid / (Germany) Frank Moser (first round)
3. (Austria) Martin Fischer / (Austria) Philipp Oswald (quarterfinals)
4. (Austria) Nikolaus Moser / (Austria) Alexander Peya (quarterfinals)

== Draw ==
Key

- Q = Qualifier
- WC = Wild card
- LL = Lucky loser
- Alt = Alternate
- ITF = ITF entry
- PR = Protected ranking
- SR = Special ranking
- SE = Special exempt
- JE = Junior exempt
- JR = Junior Accelerator Programme entrant
- CO = College Accelerator Programme entrant
- NG = Next Gen Accelerator Program entrant
- w/o = Walkover
- r = Retired
- d = Defaulted

=== Draw ===
First round
1	(United Kingdom) C Fleming (United Kingdom) R Hutchins	6	6
(Kazakhstan) M Kukushkin (Russia) D Matsukevich	2	1
(Spain) G Olaso (Ukraine) I Sergeyev
WC	(Slovakia) Marko Daniš (Kazakhstan) S Yessenbekov	w/o
3	(Austria) M Fischer (Austria) P Oswald	6	4	[12]
(Belarus) U Ignatik (Russia) K Kravchuk	4	6	[10]
(Croatia) I Dodig (Russia) E Kirillov	6	6
WC	(Russia) M Fufygin (Russia) V Reshetnikov	3	4
(Latvia) A Juška (Kazakhstan) A Kedryuk	6	6
WC	(Kazakhstan) D Braun (Russia) D Marfinsky	0	1
(Russia) E Donskoy (Russia) A Kuznetsov	4	6	[6]
4	(Austria) N Moser (Austria) A Peya	6	2	[10]
(Croatia) N Mektić (Croatia) I Zovko	4	2
(Russia) M Elgin (Russia) A Kudryavtsev	6	6
(Russia) I Belyaev (Russia) D Sitak	7	7
2	(Australia) R Junaid (Germany) F Moser	5	6^{4}

Quarterfinals
1	(United Kingdom) C Fleming (United Kingdom) R Hutchins	6	6
WC	(Slovakia) M Daniš (Kazakhstan) S Yessenbekov	3	2
3	(Austria) M Fischer (Austria) P Oswald	5	4
(Croatia) I Dodig (Russia) E Kirillov	7	6
(Latvia) A Juška (Kazakhstan) A Kedryuk	2	6	[11]
4	(Austria) N Moser (Austria) A Peya	6	4	[9]
(Russia) M Elgin (Russia) A Kudryavtsev	7	6
(Russia) I Belyaev (Russia) D Sitak	6^{4}	1

Semifinals
1	(United Kingdom) C Fleming (United Kingdom) R Hutchins	6	6
(Croatia) I Dodig (Russia) E Kirillov	4	4
(Latvia) A Juška (Kazakhstan) A Kedryuk	6	5	[10]
(Russia) M Elgin (Russia) A Kudryavtsev	2	7	[12]

Final
1	(United Kingdom) C Fleming (United Kingdom) R Hutchins	6	7
(Russia) M Elgin (Russia) A Kudryavtsev	3	6^{10}
