= 2013 Košice Open =

- Date: 10–16 June
- Edition: 11th
- Draw: 32S / 16D
- Prize money: €30,000+H
- Surface: Clay
- Location: Košice, Slovakia

Champions

Singles
- (Kazakhstan) Mikhail Kukushkin

Doubles
- (Slovakia) Kamil Čapkovič / (Slovakia) Igor Zelenay
- Košice Open

The 2013 Košice Open is a professional tennis tournament played on clay courts. It is the eleventh edition of the tournament which is part of the 2013 ATP Challenger Tour. It takes place in Košice, Slovakia between 10 and 16 June 2013.

== Singles main draw entrants ==
=== Seeds ===
Country	Player	Rank^{1}	Seed
CZE	Jan Hájek	87	1
ROU	Adrian Ungur	106	2
POR	João Sousa	119	3
RUS	Teymuraz Gabashvili	144	4
TUN	Malek Jaziri	158	5
SVK	Andrej Martin	168	6
UKR	Ivan Sergeyev	176	7
CRO	Antonio Veić	190	8

- ^{1} Rankings are as of May 27, 2013.

=== Other entrants ===
The following players received wildcards into the singles main draw:

- (Slovakia) Marco Daniš
- (Serbia) Djordje Djokovic
- (Slovakia) Miloslav Mečíř Jr.
- (Czech Republic) Adam Pavlásek

The following players received entry from the qualifying draw:

- (Bosnia and Herzegovina) Damir Džumhur
- (Ukraine) Volodymyr Uzhylovskyi
- (Austria) Maximilian Neuchrist
- (Spain) Carlos Gómez-Herrera

== Champions ==
=== Singles ===
- (Kazakhstan) Mikhail Kukushkin def. (Bosnia and Herzegovina) Damir Džumhur, 6–4, 1–6, 6–2

=== Doubles ===
- (Slovakia) Kamil Čapkovič / (Slovakia) Igor Zelenay def. (Germany) Gero Kretschmer / (Germany) Alexander Satschko, 6–4, 7–6^{(7–5)}
