= 2010 President's Cup (tennis) =

- Date: 1–7 November
- Edition: 4th
- Surface: Hard
- Location: Astana, Kazakhstan

Champions

Singles
- (Croatia) Ivan Dodig

Doubles
- (United Kingdom) Colin Fleming / (United Kingdom) Ross Hutchins
← 2009 ·	President's Cup	· 2011 →

The 2010 President's Cup was a professional tennis tournament played on outdoor hard courts. It was the fourth edition of the tournament which was part of the 2010 ATP Challenger Tour. It took place in Astana, Kazakhstan between 1 and 7 November 2010.

== ATP entrants ==
=== Seeds ===
Nationality	Player	Ranking*	Seeding
KAZ	Mikhail Kukushkin	88	1
GER	Björn Phau	89	2
GER	Rainer Schüttler	103	3
RUS	Igor Kunitsyn	106	4
CRO	Ivan Dodig	118	5
AUT	Martin Fischer	122	6
RUS	Konstantin Kravchuk	133	7
RUS	Alexander Kudryavtsev	174	8

- Rankings are as of October 25, 2010.

=== Other entrants ===
The following players received wildcards into the singles main draw:

- (Kazakhstan) Danjil Braun
- (Russia) Evgeny Donskoy
- (Thailand) Danai Udomchoke
- (Kazakhstan) Serizhan Yessenbekov

The following players received entry from the qualifying draw:

- (Russia) Mikhail Ledovskikh
- (Romania) Petru-Alexandru Luncanu
- (Russia) Denis Matsukevich
- (Russia) Vitali Reshetnikov

== Champions ==
=== Singles ===
(Croatia) Ivan Dodig def. (Russia) Igor Kunitsyn, 6–4, 6–3

=== Doubles ===
(United Kingdom) Colin Fleming / (United Kingdom) Ross Hutchins def. (Russia) Mikhail Elgin / (Russia) Alexander Kudryavtsev, 6–3, 7–6(10)
