= Astana Cup =

Tennis tournament held in Kazakhstan

Defunct tennis tournament
- Location: Astana, Kazakhstan
- Category: ATP Challenger Tour
- Surface: Hard / Outdoors
- Draw: 32S/31Q/16D
- Prize money: $50,000+H
- Website: ktf.kz

The Astana Cup was a tennis tournament part of the Association of Tennis Professionals (ATP) Challenger Tour. It was held in Astana, Kazakhstan, in 2010 and 2011.

== Past finals ==
=== Singles ===
Year	Champion	Runner-up	Score
2011	(Germany) Rainer Schüttler	(Russia) Teymuraz Gabashvili	7–6^{(8–6)}, 4–6, 6–4
2010	(Russia) Igor Kunitsyn	(Russia) Konstantin Kravchuk	4–6, 7–6^{(7–5)}, 7–6^{(7–3)}

=== Doubles ===
Year	Champions	Runners-up	Score
2011	(India) Karan Rastogi (India) Vishnu Vardhan	(Finland) Harri Heliövaara (Ukraine) Denys Molchanov	7–6^{(7–3)}, 2–6, [10–8]
2010	(Russia) Michail Elgin (Austria) Nikolaus Moser	(China) Wu Di (China) Zhang Ze	6–0, 6–4
