= Błażej Koniusz =

Polish tennis player (born 1988)

- Country (sports): Poland
- Born: 22 February 1988 (age 37) Świętochłowice, Polish People's Republic
- Turned pro: 2006
- Plays: Right-handed (Double-handed backhand)
- Prize money: $63,829

Singles
- Career record: 0–2 (ATP Tour level, Grand Slam level, and Davis Cup)
- Career titles: 0; 0 Challenger. 1 Futures
- Highest ranking: No. 445 (7 July 2008)

Doubles
- Career record: 0–1 (ATP Tour level, Grand Slam level, and Davis Cup)
- Career titles: 0; 0 Challenger. 18 Futures
- Highest ranking: No. 150 (16 February 2015)
- Last updated on: 13 June 2021.

Błażej Koniusz (Polish pronunciation: [ˈbwaʐɛj ˈkɔɲuʂ]) (born 22 February 1988) is a Polish tennis player.

Koniusz has a career high ATP singles ranking of World No. 445, achieved on 7 July 2008. He also has a career high ATP doubles ranking of World No. 150, achieved on 16 February 2015.

Koniusz began playing at the age of four, and joined his first club at the age of seven. As a junior, he and compatriot Grzegorz Panfil won the 2006 Australian Open boys' doubles championship, defeating Americans Kellen Damico and Nathaniel Schnugg 7–6^{(7–5)}, 6–3 in the final. He began his senior career in 2006.

Koniusz represented Team Poland during Davis Cup play in 2008.

== Junior Grand Slam finals ==
=== Doubles: 1 (1–0) ===
Result	Year	Championship	Surface	Partner	Opponents	Score
Win	2006	Australian Open	Hard	(Poland) Grzegorz Panfil	(United States) Kellen Damico (United States) Nathaniel Schnugg	7–6^{(7–5)}, 6–3

== ATP Challenger and ITF Futures finals ==
=== Singles: 5 (1–4) ===
Legend ATP Challenger (0–0) ITF Futures (1–4)	Finals by surface Hard (0–0) Clay (1–3) Grass (0–0) Carpet (0–1)

Result	W–L	Date	Tournament	Tier	Surface	Opponent	Score
Loss	0–1	Aug 2007	Latvia F3, Jūrmala	Futures	Clay	(Spain) Carles Poch Gradin	4-6, 1-6
Loss	0–2	Jan 2008	Austria F1, Bergheim	Futures	Carpet	(Italy) Massimo Dell'Acqua	6–4, 6–7^{(3–7)}, 4–6
Loss	0–3	May 2009	Poland F2, Kraków	Futures	Clay	(Ukraine) Denys Molchanov	3-6, 2-6
Loss	0–4	May 2010	Poland F1, Katowice	Futures	Clay	(Germany) Alexander Flock	7–6^{(7–5)}, 4–6, 4–6
Win	1–4	Jul 2013	Slovakia F1, Poprad	Futures	Clay	(Czech Republic) Martin Fafl	6-3, 7-5

=== Doubles: 38 (18–20) ===
Legend ATP Challenger (0–5) ITF Futures (18–15)	Finals by surface Hard (0–4) Clay (15–15) Grass (0–0) Carpet (3–1)

Result	W–L	Date	Tournament	Tier	Surface	Partner	Opponents	Score
Loss	0-1	May 2006	Poland F5, Bytom	Futures	Clay	(Poland) Grzegorz Panfil	(Germany) Gero Kretschmer (Australia) Clinton Thomson	6–4, 2–6, 3–6
Win	1–1	Aug 2007	Poland F5, Olsztyn	Futures	Clay	(Poland) Mateusz Kowalczyk	(Poland) Dawid Celt (Poland) Marcin Gawron	6-4, 6-2
Win	2–1	Sep 2007	Poland F8, Opole	Futures	Clay	(Poland) Mateusz Kowalczyk	(Monaco) Benjamin Balleret (France) Clément Morel	6–1, 6–1
Loss	2–2	Sep 2007	Poland F9, Gdynia	Futures	Clay	(Poland) Mateusz Kowalczyk	(Poland) Andrzej Grusiecki (Poland) Lukasz Wodnicki	3-6, 5-7
Win	3–2	Jan 2008	Austria F1, Bergheim	Futures	Carpet	(Poland) Marcin Gawron	(Italy) Massimo Dell'Acqua (Italy) Luca Vanni	6–3, 7–6^{(7–0)}
Loss	3–3	Mar 2008	Switzerland F1, Leuggern	Futures	Hard	(Poland) Grzegorz Panfil	(Jamaica) Dustin Brown (Austria) Armin Sandbichler	3-6, 2-6
Loss	3–4	May 2008	Poland F1, Katowice	Futures	Clay	(Poland) Mateusz Kowalczyk	(Poland) Grzegorz Panfil (Poland) Marcin Gawron	2–6, 6–4, [5–10]
Loss	3–5	Jun 2008	Bytom, Poland	Challenger	Clay	(Australia) Raphael Durek	(Poland) Mateusz Kowalczyk (Poland) Marcin Gawron	4–6, 6–3, [7–10]
Win	4–5	Aug 2009	Poland F4, Olsztyn	Futures	Clay	(Poland) Grzegorz Panfil	(Poland) Mateusz Szmigiel (Poland) Rafal Gozdur	6-1, 6-3
Loss	4–6	Aug 2009	Poland F5, Poznań	Futures	Clay	(Poland) Andriej Kapaś	(Poland) Piotr Gadomski (Serbia) David Savić	1–6, 4–6
Loss	4–7	May 2010	Poland F2, Kraków	Futures	Clay	(Poland) Grzegorz Panfil	(Poland) Marcin Gawron (Poland) Andriej Kapaś	6–3, 0–6, [7–10]
Win	5–7	Jun 2010	Poland F3, Koszalin	Futures	Clay	(Poland) Grzegorz Panfil	(Belarus) Sergey Betov (Hungary) Robert Varga	7–6^{(7–3)}, 6–3
Win	6–7	Jun 2010	Poland F4, Gliwice	Futures	Clay	(Poland) Grzegorz Panfil	(Belarus) Andrei Vasilevski (Belarus) Nikolai Fidirko	6-3, 6-1
Loss	6–8	Aug 2010	Slovakia F1, Piešťany	Futures	Clay	(Poland) Filip Rams	(Slovakia) Michal Pazicky (Slovakia) Adrian Sikora	7–6^{(7–4)}, 4–6, [8–10]
Loss	6–9	Jun 2011	Poland F3, Koszalin	Futures	Clay	(Poland) Andriej Kapaś	(Belarus) Aliaksandr Bury (Belarus) Nikolai Fidirko	6–1, 3–6, [6–10]
Win	7–9	Jun 2011	Poland F4, Bytom	Futures	Clay	(Poland) Andriej Kapaś	(Canada) Érik Chvojka (Czech Republic) Roman Jebavý	7–5, 6–4
Win	8–9	Aug 2011	Poland F6, Olsztyn	Futures	Clay	(Poland) Grzegorz Panfil	(Poland) Arkadiusz Kocyla (Poland) Mikolaj Szmyrgala	6–3, 6–7^{(4–7)}, [10–6]
Win	9–9	Jul 2013	Slovakia F1, Poprad	Futures	Clay	(Germany) Pirmin Haenle	(Czech Republic) Lukas Marsoun (Czech Republic) Dominik Suc	2–6, 6–3, [10–5]
Loss	9–10	Sep 2013	Georgia F1, Telavi	Futures	Clay	(Poland) Arkadiusz Kocyla	(France) Romain Arneodo (Monaco) Benjamin Balleret	6–7^{(5–7)}, 0–6
Loss	9–11	Sep 2013	Georgia F2, Telavi	Futures	Clay	(Poland) Arkadiusz Kocyla	(France) Romain Arneodo (Monaco) Benjamin Balleret	5-7, 2-6
Win	10–11	Oct 2013	Hungary F1, Budapest	Futures	Clay	(Poland) Piotr Gadomski	(Belgium) Niels Desein (Germany) Peter Torebko	6-3, 6-3
Loss	10–12	Oct 2013	Hungary F2, Budapest	Futures	Clay	(Poland) Piotr Gadomski	(Czech Republic) Marek Michalička (Germany) Moritz Baumann	5-7, 3-6
Win	11–12	Nov 2013	Czech Republic F6, Jablonec	Futures	Carpet	(Poland) Maciej Smola	(Latvia) Andis Juška (Czech Republic) Robin Stanek	4–6, 7–6^{(11–9)}, [10–5]
Win	12–12	Dec 2013	Czech Republic F7, Opava	Futures	Carpet	(Poland) Maciej Smola	(Czech Republic) Jan Blecha (Czech Republic) Roman Jebavý	6-3, 6-0
Loss	12–13	Jan 2014	Germany F1, Schwieberdingen	Futures	Carpet	(Poland) Mateusz Kowalczyk	(Sweden) Jacob Adaktusson (Bulgaria) Dimitar Kutrovsky	3–6, 6–1, [6–10]
Win	13–13	Jan 2014	France F1, Bagnoles-de-l'Orne	Futures	Clay	(Poland) Mateusz Kowalczyk	(France) Dorian Descloix (France) Gleb Sakharov	6-2, 6-3
Loss	13–14	Mar 2014	Italy F3, Trento	Futures	Hard	(Italy) Matteo Volante	(Germany) Kevin Krawietz (France) Fabrice Martin	3-6, 1-6
Win	14–14	Apr 2014	Egypt F12, Sharm El Sheikh	Futures	Clay	(Poland) Andriej Kapaś	(Germany) Steven Moneke (Netherlands) Mark Vervoort	6–2, 7–6^{(7–1)}
Win	15–14	Apr 2014	Egypt F13, Sharm El Sheikh	Futures	Clay	(Poland) Andriej Kapaś	(Italy) Francesco Garzelli (Czech Republic) Libor Salaba	6–4, 7–5
Win	16–14	Apr 2014	France F8, Angers	Futures	Clay	(Poland) Andriej Kapaś	(France) Olivier Charroin (France) Julien Obry	6–3, 6–4
Loss	16–15	Jun 2014	Vicenza, Italy	Challenger	Clay	(Poland) Mateusz Kowalczyk	(Slovakia) Andrej Martin (Slovakia) Igor Zelenay	1-6, 5-7
Loss	16–16	Jun 2014	Košice, Slovakia	Challenger	Clay	(Poland) Andriej Kapaś	(Argentina) Facundo Argüello (Uruguay) Ariel Behar	4–6, 6–7^{(4–7)}
Win	17–16	Jul 2014	Germany F7, Kassel	Futures	Clay	(Poland) Andriej Kapaś	(Chile) Nicolas Jarry (Chile) Simon Navarro	6–4, 6–2
Loss	17–17	Aug 2014	Poland F5, Poznań	Futures	Clay	(Poland) Andriej Kapaś	(Czech Republic) Roman Jebavý (Slovakia) Adrian Sikora	6–4, 3–6, [5–10]
Loss	17–18	Aug 2014	Poland F6, Bytom	Futures	Clay	(Poland) Andriej Kapaś	(Poland) Mateusz Kowalczyk (Poland) Piotr Gadomski	6–4, 3–6, [4–10]
Win	18–18	Sep 2014	Poland F7, Piekary Śląskie	Futures	Clay	(Poland) Marcin Gawron	(Poland) Maciej Smola (Poland) Piotr Gadomski	7–6^{(7–4)}, 4–6, [10–3]
Loss	18–19	Nov 2014	Brescia, Italy	Challenger	Hard	(Czech Republic) Roman Jebavý	(Ukraine) Denys Molchanov (Ukraine) Illya Marchenko	6–7^{(4–7)}, 3–6
Loss	18–20	Feb 2015	Bergamo, Italy	Challenger	Hard	(Poland) Mateusz Kowalczyk	(Germany) Martin Emmrich (Sweden) Andreas Siljeström	4–6, 5–7
