= Igor Kunitsyn =

Russian tennis player

Igor Kunitsyn Игорь Куницын
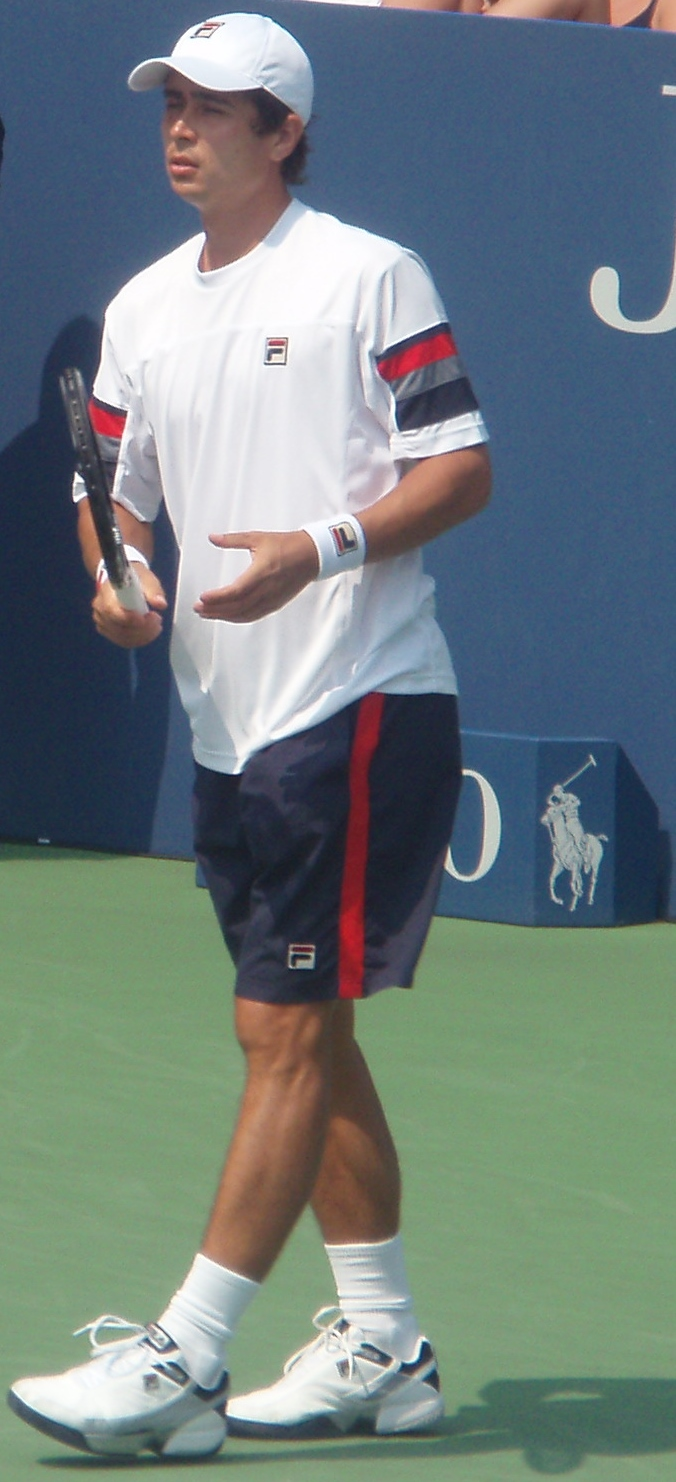
- Country (sports): Russia
- Residence: Vladivostok, Russia
- Born: 30 September 1981 (age 44) Vladivostok, Russian SFSR, Soviet Union
- Height: 1.80 m (5 ft 11 in)
- Turned pro: 1999
- Retired: 2013
- Plays: Right-handed (two-handed backhand)
- Prize money: $2,861,069

Singles
- Career record: 89–152
- Career titles: 1
- Highest ranking: No. 35 (6 July 2009)

Grand Slam singles results
- Australian Open: 2R (2010, 2011)
- French Open: 1R (2007, 2009, 2010, 2011, 2012)
- Wimbledon: 2R (2006, 2009, 2011)
- US Open: 3R (2011)

Doubles
- Career record: 65–87
- Career titles: 1
- Highest ranking: No. 49 (9 June 2008)

Grand Slam doubles results
- Australian Open: 2R (2009)
- French Open: SF (2008)
- Wimbledon: 2R (2007, 2008)
- US Open: 3R (2008)

Grand Slam mixed doubles results
- Wimbledon: 1R (2008)

Team competitions
- Davis Cup: SF (2008)
- Last updated on: 27 May 2022.

Igor Konstantinovich Kunitsyn (Russian: И́горь Константи́нович Куни́цын, IPA: [ˈiɡərʲ kʊˈnʲitsɨn]; born September 30, 1981) is a Russian former professional tennis player. He made it into the top 100 for the first time in 2006, and reached a career-high singles ranking of world No. 35 in July 2009.

== Early life ==
Kunitsyn was raised by his grandparents in Vladivostok, on the eastern coast of Russia when he was young. He started playing tennis at age seven.

== Tennis career ==
Kunitsyn is arguably best known for two matches against compatriot Marat Safin. The first of which was at the 2007 Tennis Channel Open's round-robin stage. Kunitsyn had won the first set, and had an early break in the second before Safin fought back and then got a 5–3 lead. While serving for the match, Kunitsyn broke Safin and then held to get it to 5–5. The set went to a tiebreaker which Safin won. Kunitsyn was still dangerous, as he won the first three games of the third set, before losing the next four. Kunitsyn performed the same as before, and broke Safin again to get the set on equal terms. At 5–5, Kunitsyn suffered a service break and Safin ultimately won the third set 7–5. The pair met again in the final of the Kremlin Cup, an ATP tournament played in Moscow. Kunitsyn defeated the former two-time Grand Slam winner and world No. 1.

In August 2008, he made the semifinals of the Legg Mason Tennis Classic, beating Mischa Zverev, Fabio Fognini, and Somdev Devvarman, before losing Viktor Troicki.

In June 2009, he lost to Israeli Dudi Sela, at 's-Hertogenbosch in the Netherlands in a grass-court tune-up for Wimbledon. In Wimbledon, he defeated Wimbledon debutant wildcard Grigor Dimitrov due to retirement after suffering a knee injury, before he lost to Andy Roddick in the second round in four sets, winning the third set. Following the tournament, he reached his career-high singles ranking of World No. 35 on 6 July 2009.

Heavily favored Russia was hosted by Israel in a Davis Cup quarterfinal tie in July 2009, on indoor hard courts at the Nokia Arena in Tel Aviv. With Israel having won the first two matches, in what proved to be the deciding third match Israelis Andy Ram and Jonathan Erlich beat Kunitsyn and Marat Safin, 6–3, 6–4, 6–7, 4–6, 6–4, in front of a boisterous crowd of over 10,000. Israel defeated Russia 4–1 for the win.

At the 2009 Indianapolis Tennis Championships in July, Kunistyn was beaten in the second round by 23-year-old American Wayne Odesnik.

In 2012 Wimbledon, he lost his first-round match to Go Soeda.

== ATP career finals ==
=== Singles: 1 (1 title) ===
| Legend Grand Slam Tournaments (0–0) ATP World Tour Finals (0–0) ATP Masters 1000 Series (0–0) ATP 500 Series (0–0) ATP 250 Series (1–0) | Finals by surface Hard (1–0) Clay (0–0) Grass (0–0) Carpet (0–0) | Finals by setting Outdoors (0–0) Indoors (1–0) |

| Result | W–L | Date | Tournament | Tier | Surface | Opponent | Score |
|---|---|---|---|---|---|---|---|
| Win | 1–0 | Oct 2008 | Moscow, Russia | International Series | Hard | (Russia) Marat Safin | 7–6^{(8–6)}, 6–7^{(4–7)}, 6–3 |

=== Doubles: 4 (1 title, 3 runner-ups) ===
| Legend Grand Slam Tournaments (0–0) ATP World Tour Finals (0–0) ATP Masters 1000 Series (0–0) ATP 500 Series (0–0) ATP 250 Series (1–3) | Finals by surface Hard (1–1) Clay (0–0) Grass (0–2) Carpet (0–0) | Finals by setting Outdoors (0–2) Indoors (1–1) |

| Result | W–L | Date | Tournament | Tier | Surface | Partner | Opponents | Score |
|---|---|---|---|---|---|---|---|---|
| Loss | 0–1 | Jun 2006 | Nottingham, Great Britain | International Series | Grass | (Russia) Dmitry Tursunov | (Israel) Jonathan Erlich (Israel) Andy Ram | 3–6, 2–6 |
| Loss | 0–2 | Jul 2007 | Newport, United States | International Series | Grass | (Australia) Nathan Healey | (Australia) Jordan Kerr (United States) Jim Thomas | 3–6, 5–7 |
| Loss | 0–3 | Oct 2009 | Kuala Lumpur, Malaysia | 250 Series | Hard | (Czech Republic) Jaroslav Levinský | (Poland) Mariusz Fyrstenberg (Poland) Marcin Matkowski | 2–6, 1–6 |
| Win | 1–3 | Oct 2010 | Moscow, Russia | 250 Series | Hard | (Russia) Dmitry Tursunov | (Serbia) Janko Tipsarević (Serbia) Viktor Troicki | 7–6^{(10–8)}, 6–3 |

== ATP Challenger and ITF Futures finals ==
=== Singles: 26 (14–12) ===
| Legend ATP Challenger (8–8) ITF Futures (6–4) | Finals by surface Hard (11–10) Clay (3–1) Grass (0–0) Carpet (0–1) |

| Result | W–L | Date | Tournament | Tier | Surface | Opponent | Score |
|---|---|---|---|---|---|---|---|
| Loss | 0–1 | Aug 1998 | Belarus F1, Minsk | Futures | Carpet | (Uzbekistan) Dmitriy Tomashevich | 4–6, 6–7 |
| Win | 1–1 | Sep 1998 | Ukraine F2, Gorlovka | Futures | Clay | (Russia) Kirill Ivanov-Smolensky | 7–6, 6–3 |
| Win | 2–1 | Sep 1999 | Russia F3, Tolyatti | Futures | Hard | (Russia) Artem Derepasko | 6–2, 6–4 |
| Loss | 2–2 | May 2000 | Fergana, Uzbekistan | Challenger | Hard | (Belarus) Vladimir Voltchkov | 6–4, 0–6, 4–6 |
| Loss | 2–3 | Aug 2000 | Tolyatti, Russia | Challenger | Hard | (Uzbekistan) Vadim Kutsenko | 4–6, 1–6 |
| Win | 3–3 | Jun 2001 | Italy F7, Turin | Futures | Clay | (France) Éric Prodon | 6–4, 6–1 |
| Win | 4–3 | Jan 2002 | USA F2, Delray Beach | Futures | Hard | (Italy) Giorgio Galimberti | 6–4, 6–2 |
| Loss | 4–4 | Feb 2002 | Croatia F1, Zagreb | Futures | Hard | (Croatia) Lovro Zovko | 6–4, 1–6, 6–7^{(6–8)} |
| Loss | 4–5 | Feb 2002 | Croatia F2, Zagreb | Futures | Hard | (Croatia) Lovro Zovko | 2–6, 6–3, 6–7^{(5–7)} |
| Loss | 4–6 | Apr 2002 | Uzbekistan F1, Karshi | Futures | Hard | (Chinese Taipei) Jimmy Wang | 5–7, 4–6 |
| Win | 5–6 | May 2002 | Uzbekistan F4, Namangan | Futures | Hard | (Finland) Tuomas Ketola | 6–3, 6–3 |
| Loss | 5–7 | Oct 2002 | Seoul, South Korea | Challenger | Hard | (Austria) Werner Eschauer | 2–6, ret. |
| Loss | 5–8 | Feb 2003 | Wrocław, Poland | Challenger | Hard | (Slovakia) Karol Kučera | 2–6, 1–6 |
| Win | 6–8 | Apr 2004 | Uzbekistan F2, Guliston | Futures | Hard | (Croatia) Ivan Cerović | 7–5, 6–2 |
| Win | 7–8 | May 2004 | Fergana, Uzbekistan | Challenger | Hard | (India) Prakash Amritraj | 6–4, 7–5 |
| Win | 8–8 | Jul 2005 | Tolyatti, Russia | Challenger | Hard | (Slovakia) Viktor Bruthans | 6–1, 6–2 |
| Win | 9–8 | Aug 2005 | Saransk, Russia | Challenger | Clay | (Serbia and Montenegro) Boris Pashanski | 7–5, 6–4 |
| Win | 10–8 | Nov 2007 | Shrewsbury, United Kingdom | Challenger | Hard | (Netherlands) Igor Sijsling | 6–2, 6–4 |
| Loss | 10–9 | Apr 2008 | Baton Rouge, United States | Challenger | Hard | (United States) Bobby Reynolds | 3–6, 7–6^{(7–3)}, 5–7 |
| Loss | 10–10 | May 2008 | Bordeaux, France | Challenger | Clay | (Argentina) Eduardo Schwank | 2–6, 2–6 |
| Win | 11–10 | Sep 2008 | Donetsk, Ukraine | Challenger | Hard | (Ukraine) Sergey Bubka | 6–3, 6–3 |
| Win | 12–10 | Sep 2010 | Astana, Kazakhstan | Challenger | Hard | (Russia) Konstantin Kravchuk | 4–6, 7–6^{(7–5)}, 7–6^{(7–3)} |
| Loss | 12–11 | Nov 2010 | Astana, Kazakhstan | Challenger | Hard | (Croatia) Ivan Dodig | 4–6, 3–6 |
| Loss | 12–12 | Mar 2011 | San José, Costa Rica | Challenger | Hard | (Ecuador) Giovanni Lapentti | 5–7, 3–6 |
| Win | 13–12 | May 2011 | Cremona, Italy | Challenger | Hard | (Germany) Rainer Schüttler | 6–2, 7–6^{(7–2)} |
| Win | 14–12 | Aug 2012 | Karshi, Uzbekistan | Challenger | Hard | (Belarus) Dzmitry Zhyrmont | 7–6^{(12–10)}, 6–2 |

=== Doubles: 11 (5–6) ===
| Legend ATP Challenger (4–4) ITF Futures (1–2) | Finals by surface Hard (4–4) Clay (0–2) Grass (0–0) Carpet (1–0) |

| Result | W–L | Date | Tournament | Tier | Surface | Partner | Opponents | Score |
|---|---|---|---|---|---|---|---|---|
| Loss | 0–1 | May 2001 | Uzbekistan F2, Andijan | Futures | Hard | (South Africa) Rik de Voest | (Australia) Jordan Kerr (Finland) Tuomas Ketola | 7–5, 2–6, 1–6 |
| Win | 1–1 | May 2001 | Fergana, Uzbekistan | Challenger | Hard | (South Africa) Rik de Voest | (Canada) Simon Larose (Australia) Michael Tebbutt | 6–1, 6–7^{(4–7)}, 6–3 |
| Loss | 1–2 | Apr 2004 | Uzbekistan F1, Qarshi | Futures | Hard | (Russia) Dmitri Vlasov | (Croatia) Ivan Cerović (North Macedonia) Lazar Magdinchev | 3–6, 6–2, 4–6 |
| Win | 2–2 | Aug 2004 | Segovia, Spain | Challenger | Hard | (Belarus) Vladimir Voltchkov | (Spain) Daniel Muñoz de la Nava (Spain) Iván Navarro | 3–6, 6–3, 6–2 |
| Loss | 2–4 | Aug 2004 | Bronx, United States | Challenger | Hard | (Italy) Uros Vico | (United States) Huntley Montgomery (United States) Tripp Phillips | 6–7^{(6–8)}, 7–6^{(10–8)}, 2–6 |
| Loss | 2–5 | Sep 2004 | Kyiv, Ukraine | Challenger | Clay | (Russia) Yuri Schukin | (Spain) Albert Portas (Argentina) Sergio Roitman | 1–6, 1–6 |
| Win | 3–5 | Sep 2004 | Donetsk, Ukraine | Challenger | Hard | (Italy) Uros Vico | (Switzerland) Marco Chiudinelli (Croatia) Lovro Zovko | 3–6, 6–3, 6–4 |
| Win | 4–5 | Feb 2005 | Belgrade, Serbia | Challenger | Carpet | (Ukraine) Orest Tereshchuk | (Czech Republic) Lukáš Dlouhý (Czech Republic) Jan Vacek | walkover |
| Win | 5–5 | Apr 2005 | Uzbekistan F1, Qarshi | Futures | Hard | (Russia) Sergei Demekhine | (Uzbekistan) Murad Inoyatov (Uzbekistan) Denis Istomin | 6–4, 5–7, 6–4 |
| Loss | 5–6 | Jan 2008 | Heilbronn, Germany | Challenger | Hard | (Pakistan) Aisam Qureshi | (South Africa) Rik de Voest (United States) Bobby Reynolds | 6–7^{(2–7)}, 7–6^{(7–5)}, [4–10] |
| Loss | 5–7 | Jul 2010 | Braunschweig, Germany | Challenger | Clay | (Kazakhstan) Yuri Schukin | (Portugal) Leonardo Tavares (Italy) Simone Vagnozzi | 5–7, 6–7^{(4–7)} |

== Performance timelines ==
Key
| W | F | SF | QF | #R | RR | Q# | DNQ | A | NH |

(W) winner; (F) finalist; (SF) semifinalist; (QF) quarterfinalist; (#R) rounds 4, 3, 2, 1; (RR) round-robin stage; (Q#) qualification round; (DNQ) did not qualify; (A) absent; (NH) not held; (SR) strike rate (events won / competed); (W–L) win–loss record.

=== Singles ===
| Tournament | 2000 | 2001 | 2002 | 2003 | 2004 | 2005 | 2006 | 2007 | 2008 | 2009 | 2010 | 2011 | 2012 | 2013 | SR | W–L | Win% |
|---|---|---|---|---|---|---|---|---|---|---|---|---|---|---|---|---|---|
Grand Slam tournaments
| Australian Open | A | A | A | Q1 | Q1 | Q1 | A | 1R | Q3 | 1R | 2R | 2R | 1R | Q2 | 0 / 5 | 2–5 | 29% |
| French Open | A | A | Q1 | Q2 | A | A | Q2 | 1R | A | 1R | 1R | 1R | 1R | Q1 | 0 / 5 | 0–5 | 0% |
| Wimbledon | A | A | Q2 | 1R | Q2 | Q2 | 2R | 1R | 1R | 2R | 1R | 2R | 1R | Q3 | 0 / 8 | 3–8 | 27% |
| US Open | Q1 | A | 1R | Q2 | Q1 | Q2 | 1R | 2R | 1R | 1R | A | 3R | A | Q2 | 0 / 6 | 3–6 | 33% |
| Win–loss | 0–0 | 0–0 | 0–1 | 0–1 | 0–0 | 0–0 | 1–2 | 1–4 | 0–2 | 1–4 | 1–3 | 4–4 | 0–3 | 0–0 | 0 / 24 | 8–24 | 25% |
ATP World Tour Masters 1000
| Indian Wells | A | A | A | A | A | Q1 | A | 1R | 1R | 2R | A | A | 1R | Q1 | 0 / 4 | 1–4 | 20% |
| Miami | A | A | A | A | A | Q1 | 1R | 1R | 1R | 2R | A | 2R | 2R | A | 0 / 6 | 3–6 | 33% |
| Monte Carlo | A | A | A | A | A | A | A | Q2 | A | 1R | Q2 | A | A | A | 0 / 1 | 0–1 | 0% |
| Rome | A | A | A | Q1 | A | A | Q2 | Q2 | A | 1R | A | A | A | A | 0 / 1 | 0–1 | 0% |
| Hamburg | A | A | A | Q1 | A | A | A | A | A | A | A | A | A | A | 0 / 1 | 0–1 | 0% |
| Madrid | Not Held | | A | A | A | A | A | A | A | 1R | A | Q1 | A | A | 0 / 1 | 0–1 | 0% |
| Canada | A | A | A | A | A | A | A | A | A | 1R | A | A | A | A | 0 / 1 | 0–1 | 0% |
| Cincinnati | A | A | A | Q1 | A | A | A | A | A | 2R | A | A | A | A | 0 / 1 | 1–1 | 50% |
| Shanghai | Not Held | | | | | | | | | 2R | A | A | A | A | 0 / 1 | 1–1 | 50% |
| Paris | A | A | A | A | A | A | A | A | A | A | A | 2R | A | A | 0 / 1 | 0–1 | 0% |
| Win–loss | 0–0 | 0–0 | 0–0 | 0–0 | 0–0 | 0–0 | 0–1 | 0–2 | 0–2 | 4–8 | 0–0 | 1–2 | 1–2 | 0–0 | 0 / 17 | 6–17 | 26% |

=== Doubles ===
| Tournament | 2003 | 2004 | 2005 | 2006 | 2007 | 2008 | 2009 | 2010 | 2011 | 2012 | SR | W–L | Win% |
|---|---|---|---|---|---|---|---|---|---|---|---|---|---|
Grand Slam tournaments
| Australian Open | A | A | A | A | 1R | 1R | 2R | 2R | A | 2R | 0 / 5 | 3–5 | 38% |
| French Open | A | A | A | A | QF | SF | QF | A | 1R | 1R | 0 / 5 | 10–5 | 67% |
| Wimbledon | Q1 | A | A | A | 2R | 2R | 1R | A | A | A | 0 / 3 | 2–3 | 40% |
| US Open | A | A | A | A | 1R | 3R | 1R | A | 1R | A | 0 / 4 | 2–4 | 33% |
| Win–loss | 0–0 | 0–0 | 0–0 | 0–0 | 4–4 | 7–4 | 4–4 | 1–1 | 0–2 | 1–2 | 0 / 17 | 17–17 | 50% |
ATP World Tour Masters 1000
| Indian Wells | A | A | A | A | A | A | 1R | A | A | A | 0 / 1 | 0–1 | 0% |
| Miami | A | A | A | A | A | A | 1R | A | A | A | 0 / 1 | 0–1 | 0% |
| Canada | A | A | A | A | A | A | 1R | A | A | A | 0 / 1 | 0–1 | 0% |
| Cincinnati | A | A | A | A | A | A | 1R | A | A | A | 0 / 1 | 0–1 | 0% |
| Win–loss | 0–0 | 0–0 | 0–0 | 0–0 | 0–0 | 0–0 | 0–4 | 0–0 | 0–0 | 0–0 | 0 / 4 | 0–4 | 0% |
