= Košice Open =

ATP Challenger Tour
- Event name: Košice
- Location: Košice, Slovakia
- Category: ATP Challenger Tour
- Surface: Clay
- Draw: 32S/32Q/16D
- Prize money: €30,000+H
- Website: website

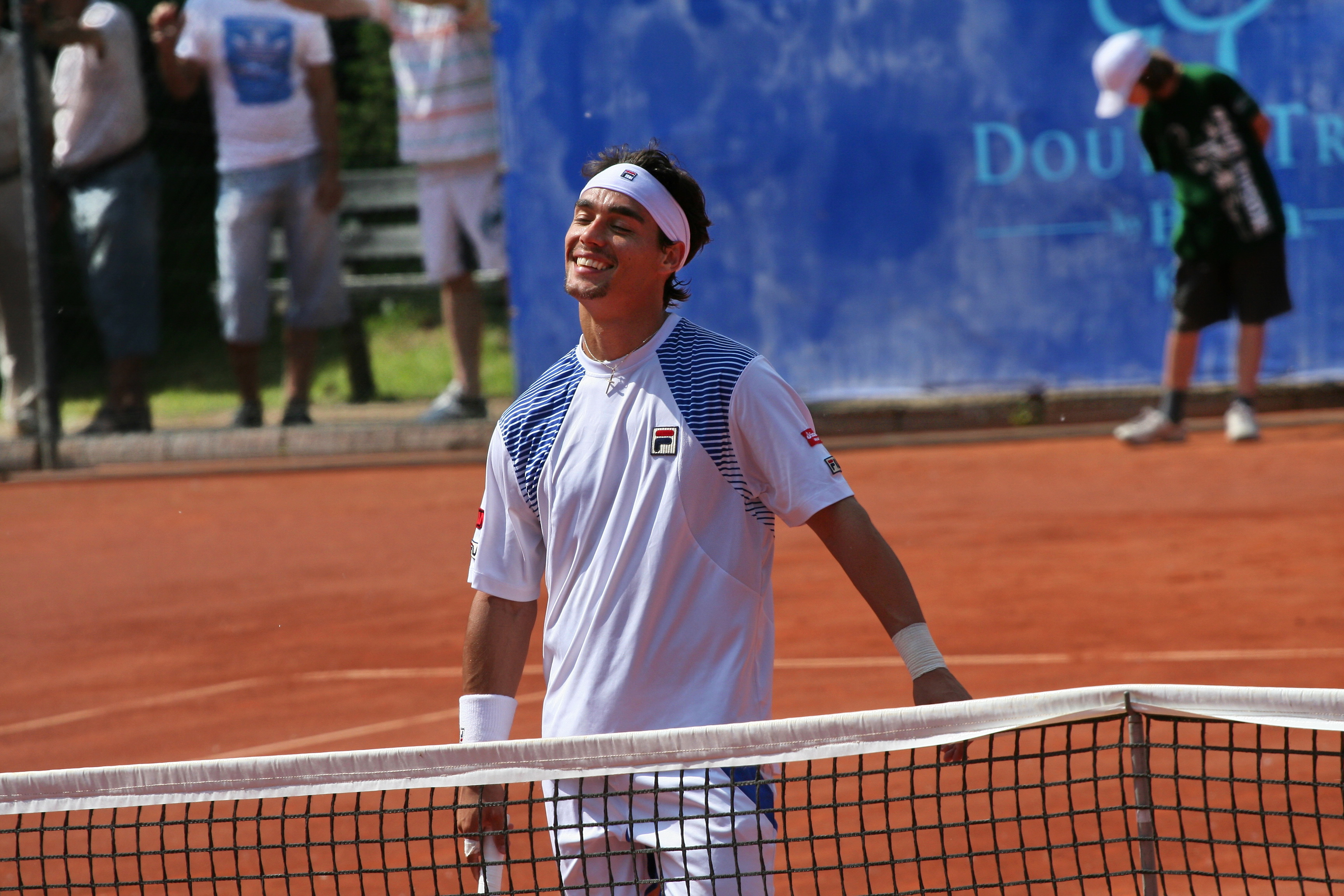
Fabio Fognini at the 2010 Košice Open

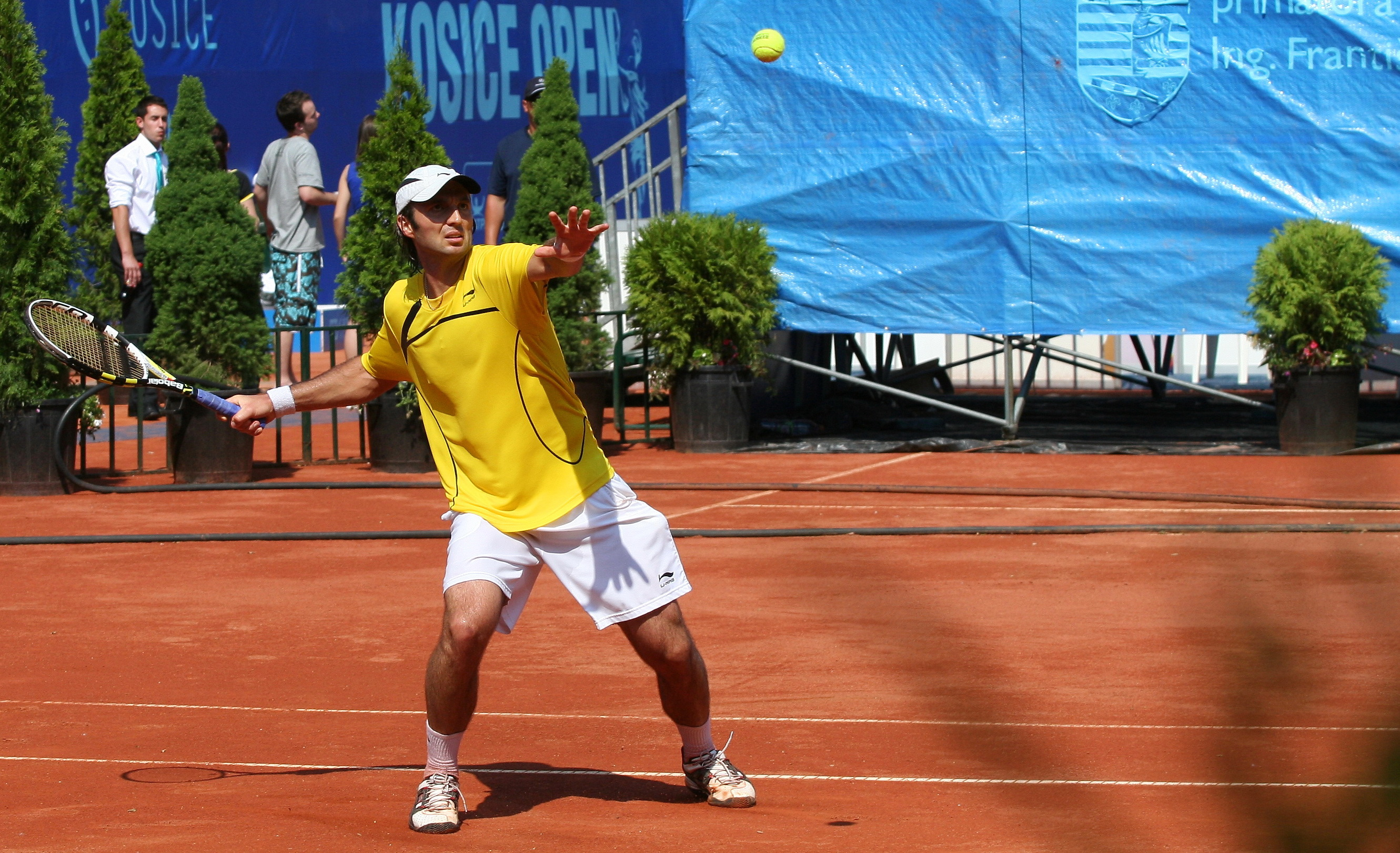
Yuri Schukin at the 2010 Košice Open

The Košice Open is a professional tennis tournament that is part of the ATP Challenger Tour. It takes place annually in Košice, Slovakia. In 2015 it was moved to Poprad as the Poprad-Tatry Challenger, before it returned to the calendar in 2026.

== Past finals ==
=== Singles ===
Year	Champion	Runner-up	Score
2026	(Switzerland) Kilian Feldbausch	(Czech Republic) Martin Krumich	6–0, 4–6, 6–4
2015–2025	Not held		
2014	(Canada) Frank Dancevic	(Slovakia) Norbert Gombos	6–2, 3–6, 6–2
2013	(Kazakhstan) Mikhail Kukushkin	(Bosnia and Herzegovina) Damir Džumhur	6–4, 1–6, 6–2
2012	(Slovenia) Aljaž Bedene	(Germany) Simon Greul	7–6^{(7–1)}, 6–2
2011	(Germany) Simon Greul	(Romania) Victor Crivoi	6–2, 6–1
2010	(Spain) Rubén Ramírez Hidalgo	(Serbia) Filip Krajinović	6–3, 6–2
2009	(France) Stéphane Robert	(Czech Republic) Jiří Vaněk	7–6(5), 7–6(5)
2008	(Czech Republic) Lukáš Rosol	(Spain) Miguel Ángel López Jaén	7–5, 6–1
2007	(France) Jérémy Chardy	(Germany) Denis Gremelmayr	4–6, 7–6(5), 6–4
2006	(France) Nicolas Devilder	(Spain) Gorka Fraile	6–0, 6–1
2005	(Romania) Răzvan Sabău	(Poland) Adam Chadaj	6–1, 6–2
2004	(Australia) Peter Luczak	(Serbia and Montenegro) Janko Tipsarević	7–5, 7–5
2003	(Argentina) Martín Vassallo Argüello	(Chile) Hermes Gamonal	6–3, 6–3

=== Doubles ===
Year	Champions	Runners-up	Score
2026	(Slovakia) Miloš Karol (Croatia) Nino Serdarušić	(Slovakia) Lukáš Pokorný (Czech Republic) David Poljak	5–7, 7–6^{(7–4)}, [10–5]
2015–2025	not held		
2014	(Argentina) Facundo Argüello (Uruguay) Ariel Behar	(Poland) Andriej Kapaś (Poland) Błażej Koniusz	6–4, 7–6^{(7–4)}
2013	(Slovakia) Kamil Čapkovič (Slovakia) Igor Zelenay	(Germany) Gero Kretschmer (Germany) Alexander Satschko	6–4, 7–6^{(7–5)}
2012	(Poland) Tomasz Bednarek (Poland) Mateusz Kowalczyk	(Belarus) Uladzimir Ignatik (Belarus) Andrei Vasilevski	2–6, 7–5, [14–12]
2011	(Germany) Simon Greul (Germany) Bastian Knittel	(Argentina) Facundo Bagnis (Argentina) Eduardo Schwank	2–6, 6–3, [11–9]
2010	(Slovakia) Miloslav Mečíř Jr. (Slovakia) Marek Semjan	(Brazil) Ricardo Hocevar (Brazil) Caio Zampieri	3–6, 6–1, [13–11]
2009	(Spain) Rubén Ramírez Hidalgo (Spain) Santiago Ventura	(Slovakia) Dominik Hrbatý (Slovakia) Martin Kližan	6–2, 7–6(5)
2008	(Poland) Tomasz Bednarek (Slovakia) Igor Zelenay	(Spain) Miguel Ángel López Jaén (Spain) Carles Poch-Gradin	6–1, 4–6, 13–11
2007	(Slovakia) Filip Polášek (Czech Republic) Lukáš Rosol	(Italy) Leonardo Azzaro (Italy) Flavio Cipolla	6–1, 7–6(5)
2006	(Slovakia) Viktor Bruthans (Czech Republic) Pavel Šnobel	(Slovakia) Kamil Čapkovič (Slovakia) Lukáš Lacko	7–5, 5–7, 10–4
2005	(Czech Republic) Petr Luxa (Slovakia) Igor Zelenay	(Sweden) Johan Landsberg (Israel) Harel Levy	6–4, 6–2
2004	(United States) Devin Bowen (Australia) Peter Luczak	(Czech Republic) Jan Hernych (Czech Republic) Petr Kralert	6–2, 7–6(6)
2003	(Australia) Stephen Huss (South Africa) Myles Wakefield	(Spain) Álex López Morón (Argentina) Andrés Schneiter	6–4, 6–3
