= Marek Semjan =

Slovak tennis player

- Country (sports): Slovakia
- Residence: Slovakia
- Born: 7 November 1987 (age 38) Czechoslovakia (now Slovakia)
- Plays: Right-handed
- Prize money: US$196,745

Singles
- Career record: 0–0
- Career titles: 0
- Highest ranking: No. 218 (30 August 2010)

Grand Slam singles results
- Australian Open: Q1 (2011)
- French Open: Q1 (2011)

Doubles
- Career record: 0–0
- Career titles: 0
- Highest ranking: No. 270 (31 August 2009)
- Last updated on: 24 February 2020.

Marek Semjan (Slovak pronunciation: [ˈmarek ˈsemjan]; born 7 November 1987) is a Slovak tennis player playing on the ATP Challenger Tour. On 30 August 2010, he reached his highest ATP singles ranking of 218.

== Career ==
He won over top seed Fernando Verdasco at the 2012 UniCredit Czech Open in Prostějov in three sets 6–4, 6–7 (5–7), 6–4.

== Challenger finals ==
Legend
ATP Challenger Tour (2–2)

=== Singles: 2 (0–2) ===
Outcome	No.	Date (Final)	Tournament	Surface	Opponent in the final	Score
Runner-up	1.	1 August 2010	Saransk, Russia	Clay	(Ukraine) Ivan Sergeyev	6–7^{(2–7)}, 1–6
Runner-up	2.	14 August 2010	Samarkand, Uzbekistan	Clay	(Slovakia) Andrej Martin	4–6, 5–7

=== Doubles: 2 (2–0) ===
Outcome	No.	Date	Tournament	Surface	Partner	Opponents in the final	Score
Winners	1.	23 November 2008	Yokohama, Japan	Hard	(Czech Republic) Tomáš Cakl	(United States) Brendan Evans (Austria) Martin Slanar	6–3, 7–6^{(7–1)}
Winners	2.	12 June 2010	Košice, Slovakia	Clay	(Slovakia) Miloslav Mečíř Jr.	(Brazil) Ricardo Hocevar (Brazil) Caio Zampieri	3–6, 6–1, [13–11]
