= Miloslav Mečíř Jr. =

Slovak tennis player

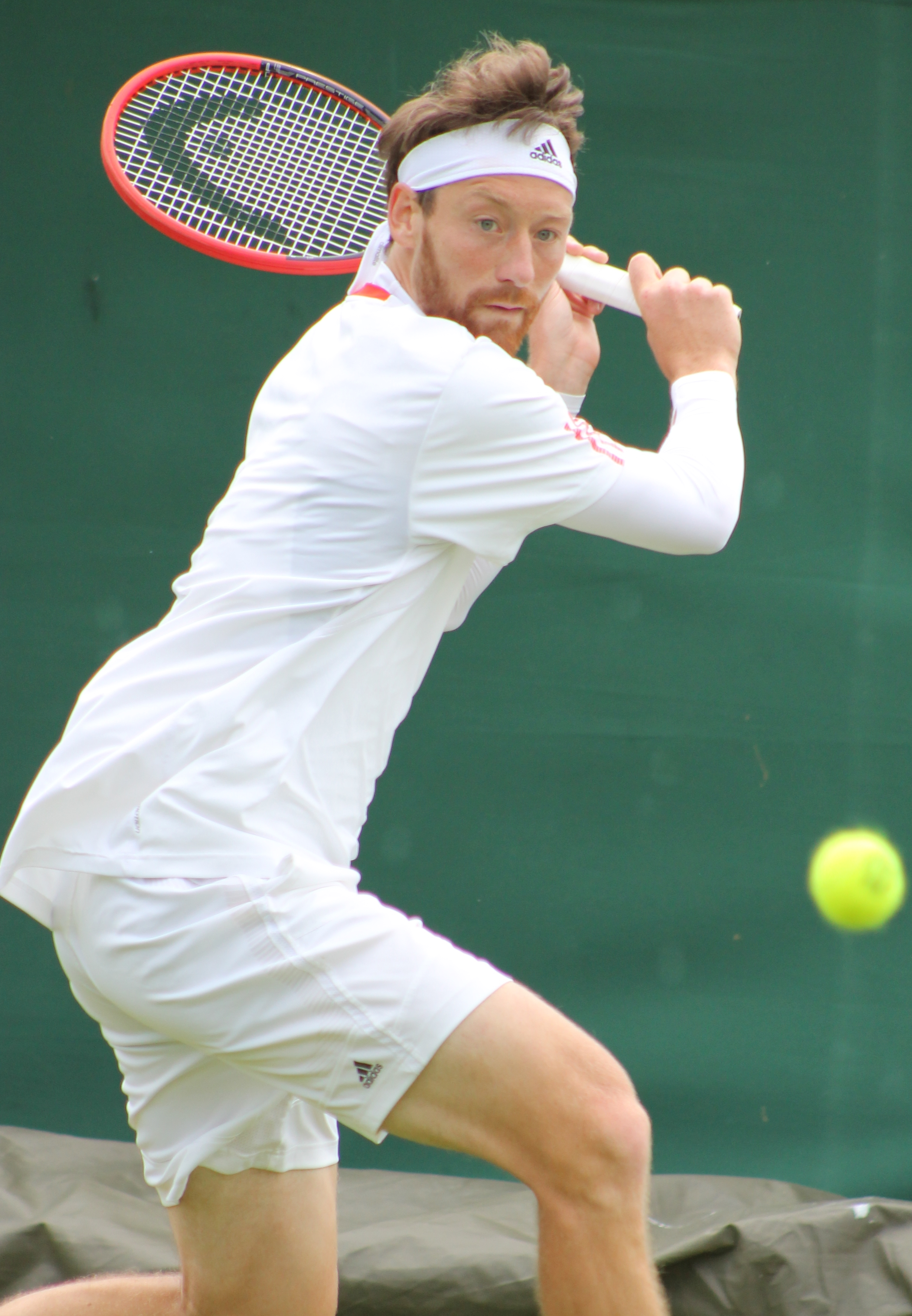
- Country (sports): Slovakia
- Residence: Bratislava, Slovakia
- Born: 20 January 1988 (age 37); Prague, Czech Republic
- Height: 1.96 m (6 ft 5 in)
- Plays: Right-handed (two handed backhand)
- Prize money: US$228,362

Singles
- Career record: 1–3
- Career titles: 0
- Highest ranking: No. 169 (11 August 2014)

Grand Slam singles results
- Australian Open: Q1 (2014, 2015)
- French Open: 1R (2014)
- Wimbledon: Q3 (2014)
- US Open: Q2 (2013, 2014)

Doubles
- Career record: 0–0
- Career titles: 0
- Highest ranking: No. 282 (8 November 2010)
- Last updated on: 14 July 2017.

Miloslav Mečíř Jr. (Slovak pronunciation: [ˈmilɔslaw ˈmetʂiːr]; born 20 January 1988) is a Slovak former tennis player. He is the son of Slovak tennis player and Olympic Gold medalist, Miloslav Mečíř. He qualified for his first Grand Slam at the 2014 French Open, but exited at the first round. On 11 August 2014, he reached his highest ATP singles ranking of 169 whilst his highest doubles ranking was 282 on 8 November 2010.

== Career finals ==
=== Singles finals ===
Legend
ATP Challenger Tour (0–1)
Futures Tour (6–8)

=== Doubles finals ===
Legend
ATP Challenger Tour (1–0)
Futures Tour (1–2)

=== Singles: 15 (6–9) ===
Outcome	No.	Date	Tournament	Surface	Opponent in the final	Score
Runner-up	1.	3 December 2007	Czech Republic F5 Futures, Frydland Nad Ostravici	Carpet	(Russia) Konstantin Kravchuk	7–6^{(7–5)}, 4–6, 6–7^{(3–7)}
Winner	1.	26 January 2009	Austria F3 Futures, Bergheim by Salzburg	Carpet	(Austria) Nicolas Reissig	6–3, 6–4
Runner-up	2.	16 March 2009	Switzerland F3 Futures, Vaduz	Carpet	(Germany) Dustin Brown	6–3, 4–6, 6–7^{(6–8)}
Runner-up	3.	31 August 2009	Israel F5 Futures, Ramat Hasharon	Hard	(Israel) Noam Okun	3–6, 2–6
Winner	2.	8 February 2010	Israel F3 Futures, Eilat	Hard	(Italy) Thomas Fabbiano	6–4, 7–6^{(8–6)}
Winner	3.	26 July 2010	Great Britain F11 Futures, Chiswick	Hard	(United Kingdom) Joshua Milton	6–2, 6–4
Runner-up	4.	27 June 2011	Spain F22 Futures, Palma de Rio	Hard	(Spain) Arnau Brugués-Davi	1–6, 3–6
Runner-up	5.	9 April 2012	Turkey F14 Futures, Antalya-Belconti	Hard	(Czech Republic) Jan Minář	6–4, 6–7^{(5–7)}, 3–6
Runner-up	6.	30 July 2012	Slovakia F1 Futures, Piešťany	Clay	(Slovakia) Andrej Martin	6–1, 6–7^{(5–7)}, 1–6
Runner-up	7.	27 August 2012	Austria F8 Futures, St. Pölten	Clay	(Italy) Riccardo Bellotti	4–6, 3–6
Winner	4.	12 November 2012	Czech Republic F9 Futures, Jablonec nad Nisou	Carpet	(Czech Republic) Marek Michalicka	6–4, 3–6, 7–6^{(7–3)}
Winner	5.	21 January 2013	Germany F3 Futures, Kaarst	Carpet	(Netherlands) Matwé Middelkoop	6–2, 7–6^{(7–3)}
Winner	6.	18 March 2013	Croatia F5 Futures, Rovinj	Clay	(Austria) Dominic Thiem	5–5, retired
Runner-up	8.	20 January 2014	Germany F3 Futures, Kaarst	Carpet	(Georgia (country)) Nikoloz Basilashvili	6–2, 5–7, 3–6
Runner-up	9.	28 April 2014	Prosperita Open, Ostrava	Clay	(Russia) Andrey Kuznetsov	6–2, 3–6, 0–6

=== Doubles: 4 (2–2) ===
Outcome	No.	Date	Tournament	Surface	Partner	Opponents in the final	Score
Runners-up	1.	31 August 2009	Israel F5 Futures, Ramat Hasharon	Hard	(New Zealand) Marcus Daniell	(United States) John Paul Fruttero (New Zealand) G. D. Jones	6–3, 2–6, [4–10]
Winners	1.	25 January 2010	Israel F1 Futures, Eilat	Hard	(Slovakia) Andrej Martin	(China) Wu Di (China) Zhang Ze	6–2, 6–3
Runners-up	2.	1 February 2010	Israel F2 Futures, Eilat	Hard	(Slovakia) Andrej Martin	(United States) Cory Parr (United States) Todd Paul	6–3, 3–6, [5–10]
Winners	2.	12 June 2010	Košice, Slovakia	Clay	(Slovakia) Marek Semjan	(Brazil) Ricardo Hocevar (Brazil) Caio Zampieri	3–6, 6–1, [13–11]

== Singles performance timeline ==
Key
W	F	SF	QF	#R	RR	Q#	DNQ	A	NH

(W) winner; (F) finalist; (SF) semifinalist; (QF) quarterfinalist; (#R) rounds 4, 3, 2, 1; (RR) round-robin stage; (Q#) qualification round; (DNQ) did not qualify; (A) absent; (NH) not held; (SR) strike rate (events won / competed); (W–L) win–loss record.

Tournament	2013	2014	2015	W–L
Grand Slam tournaments
Australian Open	A	Q1	Q1	0–0
French Open	A	1R	A	0–1
Wimbledon	A	Q3	A	0–0
US Open	Q2	Q2	A	0–0
Win–loss	0–0	0–1	0–0	0–1
Career statistics
Titles–Finals	0–0	0–0	0–0	0–0
Year-end ranking	223	197	993	

== See also ==
- Miloslav Mečíř
