= 2012 Penza Cup – Doubles =

Doubles
- 2012 Penza Cup

Final
- Champions: (Russia) Konstantin Kravchuk (Austria) Nikolaus Moser
- Runners-up: (India) Yuki Bhambri (India) Divij Sharan
- Score: 6–7^{(5–7)}, 6–3, [10–7]

Events
Singles	Doubles
← 2011 ·	Penza Cup	· 2013 →

Arnau Brugués-Davi and Malek Jaziri were the defending champions but decided not to participate.
Konstantin Kravchuk and Nikolaus Moser won the title, defeating Yuki Bhambri and Divij Sharan 6–7^{(5–7)}, 6–3, [10–7] in the final.

== Seeds ==
1. (India) Yuki Bhambri / (India) Divij Sharan (final)
2. (Russia) Konstantin Kravchuk / (Austria) Nikolaus Moser (champions)
3. (Russia) Mikhail Fufygin / (Russia) Vitali Reshetnikov (quarterfinals)
4. (Russia) Evgeny Donskoy / (Russia) Evgeny Kirillov (semifinals)

== Draw ==
=== Key ===
- Q = Qualifier
- WC = Wild card
- LL = Lucky loser
- Alt = Alternate
- SE = Special exempt
- PR = Protected ranking
- ITF = ITF entry
- JE = Junior exempt
- w/o = Walkover
- r = Retired
- d = Defaulted
- SR = Special ranking

=== Draw ===
First round
1	(India) Y Bhambri (India) D Sharan	6	3	[10]
(Russia) V Baluda (Ukraine) O Nedovyesov	3	6	[8]
WC	(Russia) Ervand Gasparyan (Russia) E Karlovskiy	2	2
(Russia) A Karatsev (Russia) R Muzaev	6	6
4	(Russia) E Donskoy (Russia) E Kirillov	6	6
(Russia) Ilya Chkoniya (Russia) Mikhail Vasiliev	2	4
(Ukraine) I Marchenko (Ukraine) D Molchanov	6	5	[10]
(Slovakia) K Čapkovič (Belgium) N Desein	3	7	[8]
(Russia) I Nedelko (Russia) S Vovk	4	4
(Russia) Sergei Krotiouk (Russia) A Kumantsov	6	6
WC	(Russia) Timur Alshin (Russia) Alexey Tumakov	3	3
3	(Russia) Mikhail Fufygin (Russia) Vitali Reshetnikov	6	6
Q	(Russia) Vladimir Geller (Russia) A Zaitsev	6	6
(Ukraine) Stanislav Poplavskyy (Russia) Ilia Shatskiy	4	4
WC	(Russia) Mikhail Biryugov (Russia) A Manegin	4	3
2	(Russia) K Kravchuk (Austria) N Moser	6	6

Quarterfinals
1	(India) Y Bhambri (India) D Sharan	7^{7}	6
(Russia) A Karatsev (Russia) R Muzaev	6^{2}	2
4	(Russia) E Donskoy (Russia) E Kirillov	6	6
(Ukraine) I Marchenko (Ukraine) D Molchanov	2	4
(Russia) Sergei Krotiouk (Russia) A Kumantsov	6	2	[10]
3	(Russia) Mikhail Fufygin (Russia) Vitali Reshetnikov	4	6	[3]
Q	(Russia) Vladimir Geller (Russia) A Zaitsev	6^{2}	3
2	(Russia) K Kravchuk (Austria) N Moser	7^{7}	6

Semifinals
1	(India) Y Bhambri (India) D Sharan	6	6^{5}	[10]
4	(Russia) E Donskoy (Russia) E Kirillov	3	7^{7}	[8]
(Russia) Sergei Krotiouk (Russia) A Kumantsov	4	4
2	(Russia) K Kravchuk (Austria) N Moser	6	6

Final
1	(India) Y Bhambri (India) D Sharan	7^{7}	3	[7]
2	(Russia) K Kravchuk (Austria) N Moser	6^{5}	6	[10]
