= 2012 Penza Cup – Singles =

Singles
- 2012 Penza Cup

Final
- Champion: (Ukraine) Illya Marchenko
- Runner-up: (Russia) Evgeny Donskoy
- Score: 7–5, 6–3

Events
Singles	Doubles
← 2011 ·	Penza Cup	· 2013 →

Arnau Brugués-Davi was the defending champion but decided not to participate.
Illya Marchenko won the tournament by defeating Evgeny Donskoy 7–5, 6–3 in the final.

== Seeds ==
1. (Russia) Alexander Kudryavtsev (first round, retired because of a right elbow injury)
2. (Russia) Evgeny Donskoy (semifinals)
3. (Russia) Konstantin Kravchuk (semifinals)
4. (India) Yuki Bhambri (quarterfinals)
5. (Slovakia) Kamil Čapkovič (quarterfinals)
6. (Ukraine) Denys Molchanov (quarterfinals)
7. (Russia) Evgeny Kirillov (semifinals)
8. (Russia) Andrey Kumantsov (second round)

== Draw ==
=== Key ===
- Q = Qualifier
- WC = Wild card
- LL = Lucky loser
- Alt = Alternate
- SE = Special exempt
- PR = Protected ranking
- ITF = ITF entry
- JE = Junior exempt
- w/o = Walkover
- r = Retired
- d = Defaulted
- SR = Special ranking

=== Finals ===
Semifinals
(Ukraine) Illya Marchenko	6^{7}	6	6
3	(Russia) Konstantin Kravchuk	7	4	2
7	(Russia) Evgeny Kirillov	2	6^{4}
2	(Russia) Evgeny Donskoy	6	7

Final
(Ukraine) Illya Marchenko	7	6
2	(Russia) Evgeny Donskoy	5	3

=== Top half ===
First round
1	(Russia) A Kudryavtsev	0^{r}
Q	(Russia) M Biryukov	2
(France) L Recouderc	6	4	6
WC	(Russia) Alexey Tumakov	4	6	3
(Ukraine) O Nedovyesov	2	6	6^{4}
(Ukraine) I Marchenko	6	1	7^{7}
Q	(Russia) R Muzaev	5	3
8	(Russia) A Kumantsov	7	6
3	(Russia) K Kravchuk	2	7^{13}	6
(Belgium) N Desein	6	6^{11}	4
Q	(Russia) E Karlovskiy	3	2
(Russia) I Nedelko	6	6
WC	(Russia) A Manegin	3	4
(Russia) Sergei Krotiouk	6	6
(Russia) Ervand Gasparyan	5	0
6	(Ukraine) D Molchanov	7	6

Second round
Q	(Russia) M Biryukov	5	0
(France) L Recouderc	7	6
(Ukraine) I Marchenko	6	6
8	(Russia) A Kumantsov	4	3
3	(Russia) K Kravchuk	6	6
(Russia) I Nedelko	2	1
(Russia) Sergei Krotiouk	3	4
6	(Ukraine) D Molchanov	6	6

Quarterfinals
(France) L Recouderc	6	6^{6}	5
(Ukraine) I Marchenko	4	7^{8}	7
3	(Russia) K Kravchuk	6	7
6	(Ukraine) D Molchanov	3	5

Semifinals
(Ukraine) I Marchenko	6^{7}	6	6
3	(Russia) K Kravchuk	7	4	2

=== Bottom half ===
First round
7	(Russia) E Kirillov	3
(Russia) V Rudnev	0^{r}
(Russia) S Vovk	2	6	7
Q	(Russia) A Zaitsev	6	2	5
(Republic of Ireland) J McGee	6	6
WC	(Russia) Ilya Chkoniya	3	1
(India) D Sharan	2	3
4	(India) Y Bhambri	6	6
5	(Slovakia) K Čapkovič	5	6	6
(Austria) N Moser	7	4	0
(Ukraine) Stanislav Poplavskyy	7^{7}	6
Alt	(Russia) Mikhail Fufygin	6^{5}	3
(Russia) Mikhail Vasiliev	3	1
Alt	(Russia) V Baluda	6	6
WC	(Russia) A Karatsev	3	4
2	(Russia) E Donskoy	6	6

Second round
7	(Russia) E Kirillov	6	6
(Russia) S Vovk	3	3
(Republic of Ireland) J McGee	2	1
4	(India) Y Bhambri	6	6
5	(Slovakia) K Čapkovič	7	6
(Ukraine) Stanislav Poplavskyy	5	0
Alt	(Russia) V Baluda	5	4
2	(Russia) E Donskoy	7	6

Quarterfinals
7	(Russia) E Kirillov	3	6	6
4	(India) Y Bhambri	6	1	3
5	(Slovakia) K Čapkovič	3	1
2	(Russia) E Donskoy	6	6

Semifinals
7	(Russia) E Kirillov	2	6^{4}
2	(Russia) E Donskoy	6	7
