= 2009 Penza Cup – Doubles =

Doubles
- 2009 Penza Cup

Final
- Champions: (Russia) Michail Elgin (Russia) Alexandre Kudryavtsev
- Runners-up: (Kazakhstan) Alexey Kedryuk (Russia) Denis Matsukevich
- Score: 4–6, 6–3, [10–6]

Events
Singles	Doubles
← 2008 ·	Penza Cup	· 2010 →

Denis Istomin and Evgeny Kirillov were the defending champions, but only Kirillov started in this tournament. He teamed up with Sergei Bubka, however they lost to Andis Juška and Deniss Pavlovs in the quarterfinal.
Michail Elgin and Alexandre Kudryavtsev defeated Alexey Kedryuk and Denis Matsukevich 4–6, 6–3, [10–6] in the final.

== Seeds ==
1. (Russia) Michail Elgin / (Russia) Alexandre Kudryavtsev (champions)
2. (Ukraine) Sergei Bubka / (Russia) Evgeny Kirillov (quarterfinals)
3. (Netherlands) Matwé Middelkoop / (Ukraine) Denys Molchanov (quarterfinals)
4. (Kazakhstan) Alexey Kedryuk / (Russia) Denis Matsukevich (final)

== Draw ==
=== Key ===
- Q = Qualifier
- WC = Wild card
- LL = Lucky loser
- Alt = Alternate
- SE = Special exempt
- PR = Protected ranking
- ITF = ITF entry
- JE = Junior exempt
- w/o = Walkover
- r = Retired
- d = Defaulted
- SR = Special ranking

=== Draw ===
First round
1	(Russia) M Elgin (Russia) A Kudryavtsev	6	6
Q	(Russia) I Karpov (Russia) A Vasin	3	4
(Russia) P Chekhov (Russia) V Rudnev	2	4
WC	(Russia) S Krotiouk (Russia) A Manegin	6	6
3	(Netherlands) M Middelkoop (Ukraine) D Molchanov	6	6
(Russia) I Belyaev (Spain) I Cervantes-Huegun	3	4
(Russia) E Donskoy (Russia) K Kravchuk	6	6
(Russia) D Arsenov (Russia) A Kumantsov	4	4
(Japan) J Mitsuhashi (Poland) G Panfil	6	1	[10]
(Kazakhstan) M Kukushkin (Russia) V Reshetnikov	2	6	[6]
WC	(Russia) V Dubinsky (Russia) M Ledovskikh	2	0
4	(Kazakhstan) A Kedryuk (Russia) D Matsukevich	6	6
(Latvia) A Juška (Latvia) D Pavlovs	6	6
WC	(Georgia (country)) N Basilashvili (Russia) E Gasparyan	2	2
(United Kingdom) C Eaton (Ukraine) I Marchenko	5	4
2	(Ukraine) S Bubka (Russia) E Kirillov	7	6

Quarterfinals
1	(Russia) M Elgin (Russia) A Kudryavtsev	6	6
WC	(Russia) S Krotiouk (Russia) A Manegin	0	2
3	(Netherlands) M Middelkoop (Ukraine) D Molchanov	2	2
(Russia) E Donskoy (Russia) K Kravchuk	6	6
(Japan) J Mitsuhashi (Poland) G Panfil	3	3
4	(Kazakhstan) A Kedryuk (Russia) D Matsukevich	6	6
(Latvia) A Juška (Latvia) D Pavlovs	3	7	[10]
2	(Ukraine) S Bubka (Russia) E Kirillov	6	5	[6]

Semifinals
1	(Russia) M Elgin (Russia) A Kudryavtsev	6	7
(Russia) E Donskoy (Russia) K Kravchuk	1	6^{4}
4	(Kazakhstan) A Kedryuk (Russia) D Matsukevich	7	6^{5}	[10]
(Latvia) A Juška (Latvia) D Pavlovs	5	7	[7]

Finals
1	(Russia) M Elgin (Russia) A Kudryavtsev	4	6	[10]
4	(Kazakhstan) A Kedryuk (Russia) D Matsukevich	6	3	[6]
