= 2011 Penza Cup – Singles =

Singles
- 2011 Penza Cup

Final
- Champion: (Spain) Arnau Brugués-Davi
- Runner-up: (Kazakhstan) Mikhail Kukushkin
- Score: 4–6, 6–3, 6–2

Events
Singles	Doubles
- Penza Cup

Mikhail Kukushkin was the defending champion and reached the final. Arnau Brugués-Davi defeated him 4–6, 6–3, 6–2 to win the title.

== Seeds ==
1. (Kazakhstan) Mikhail Kukushkin (final)
2. (Russia) Alexandre Kudryavtsev (first round)
3. (Slovakia) Lukáš Lacko (second round)
4. (Russia) Konstantin Kravchuk (first round)
5. (Republic of Ireland) Conor Niland (first round, retired due to right hip injury)
6. (Switzerland) Marco Chiudinelli (semifinals)
7. (Israel) Amir Weintraub (semifinals)
8. (Spain) Arnau Brugués-Davi (champion)

== Draw ==
Key

- Q = Qualifier
- WC = Wild card
- LL = Lucky loser
- Alt = Alternate
- ITF = ITF entry
- PR = Protected ranking
- SR = Special ranking
- SE = Special exempt
- JE = Junior exempt
- JR = Junior Accelerator Programme entrant
- CO = College Accelerator Programme entrant
- NG = Next Gen Accelerator Program entrant
- w/o = Walkover
- r = Retired
- d = Defaulted

=== Finals ===
Semifinals
1	(Kazakhstan) Mikhail Kukushkin	6	6
6	(Switzerland) Marco Chiudinelli	3	3
7	(Israel) Amir Weintraub	2	6	1
8	(Spain) Arnau Brugués-Davi	6	3	6

Final
1	(Kazakhstan) Mikhail Kukushkin	6	3	2
8	(Spain) Arnau Brugués-Davi	4	6	6

=== Top half ===
First round
1	(Kazakhstan) M Kukushkin	6	6
Q	(Russia) Anton Zaytsev	2	1
(Tunisia) M Jaziri	7^{8}	6
Q	(Russia) D Sitak	6^{6}	3
(Russia) V Rudnev	6	6^{1}	6
(Slovakia) M Semjan	3	7^{7}	1
(Croatia) N Mektić	6
5	(Republic of Ireland) C Niland	1^{r}
3	(Slovakia) L Lacko	6	6
(Russia) Alexander Lobkov	2	2
Q	(Russia) Vitaly Kachanovskiy	3	1
(Ukraine) S Bubka	6	6
(France) G Rufin	6	6
WC	(Russia) Vitali Reshetnikov	2	1
WC	(Russia) A Manegin	1	4
6	(Switzerland) M Chiudinelli	6	6

Second round
1	(Kazakhstan) M Kukushkin	6	5	6
(Tunisia) M Jaziri	4	7	1
(Russia) V Rudnev	7^{7}	4	2
(Croatia) N Mektić	6^{3}	6	6
3	(Slovakia) L Lacko	1	7^{7}	2
(Ukraine) S Bubka	6	6^{4}	6
(France) G Rufin	4	3
6	(Switzerland) M Chiudinelli	6	6

Quarterfinals
1	(Kazakhstan) M Kukushkin	6	7^{7}
(Croatia) N Mektić	2	6^{0}
(Ukraine) S Bubka	7	4	5
6	(Switzerland) M Chiudinelli	5	6	7

Semifinals
1	(Kazakhstan) M Kukushkin	6	6
6	(Switzerland) M Chiudinelli	3	3

=== Bottom half ===
First round
7	(Israel) A Weintraub	6	6
Q	(Russia) V Baluda	3	1
(Russia) M Elgin	6	3	3
(Russia) Mikhail Vasiliev	3	6	6
(Russia) Ervand Gasparyan	6	6
WC	(Russia) Timur Alshin	1	0
(Spain) A Menéndez	7^{7}	6
4	(Russia) K Kravchuk	6^{1}	2
8	(Spain) A Brugués-Davi	6	6
(Russia) D Matsukevich	3	4
WC	(Russia) Illia Chkonia	1	3
(Russia) E Kirillov	6	6
(Russia) A Kumantsov	6^{3}	3
(Sweden) M Ryderstedt	7^{7}	6
(Russia) M Ledovskikh	6	6
2	(Russia) A Kudryavtsev	4	1

Second round
7	(Israel) A Weintraub	3	6	6
(Russia) Mikhail Vasiliev	6	3	4
(Russia) Ervand Gasparyan	7^{7}	6
(Spain) A Menéndez	6^{4}	2
8	(Spain) A Brugués-Davi
(Russia) E Kirillov	w/o
(Sweden) M Ryderstedt	6^{6}	2
(Russia) M Ledovskikh	7^{8}	6

Quarterfinals
7	(Israel) A Weintraub	6	6
(Russia) Ervand Gasparyan	4	1
8	(Spain) A Brugués-Davi	6	6
(Russia) M Ledovskikh	3	4

Semifinals
7	(Israel) A Weintraub	2	6	1
8	(Spain) A Brugués-Davi	6	3	6
