= 2009 Penza Cup – Singles =

Singles
- 2009 Penza Cup

Final
- Champion: (Kazakhstan) Mikhail Kukushkin
- Runner-up: (Ukraine) Illya Marchenko
- Score: 6–4, 6–2

Events
Singles	Doubles
← 2008 ·	Penza Cup	· 2010 →

Benedikt Dorsch was the defending champion, but he chose to not start this year.
Mikhail Kukushkin defeated Illya Marchenko 6–4, 6–2 in the final.

== Seeds ==
1. (Russia) Michail Elgin (quarterfinals)
2. (Kazakhstan) Mikhail Kukushkin (champion)
3. (Ukraine) Sergei Bubka (first round)
4. (Russia) Alexandre Kudryavtsev (quarterfinals)
5. (Ukraine) Illya Marchenko (final)
6. (Latvia) Deniss Pavlovs (first round)
7. (Spain) Iñigo Cervantes-Huegun (semifinals)
8. (Netherlands) Matwé Middelkoop (quarterfinals)

== Draw ==
=== Key ===
- Q = Qualifier
- WC = Wild card
- LL = Lucky loser
- Alt = Alternate
- SE = Special exempt
- PR = Protected ranking
- ITF = ITF entry
- JE = Junior exempt
- w/o = Walkover
- r = Retired
- d = Defaulted
- SR = Special ranking

=== Final four ===
Semifinals
5	(Ukraine) Illya Marchenko	6	6
(Australia) Greg Jones	4	1
7	(Spain) Iñigo Cervantes-Huegun	5	0
2	(Kazakhstan) Mikhail Kukushkin	7	6

Final
5	(Ukraine) Illya Marchenko	4	2
2	(Kazakhstan) Mikhail Kukushkin	6	6

=== Top half ===
First round
1	(Russia) M Elgin	3	6	6
(Russia) E Kirillov	6	3	2
(Russia) D Arsenov	4	4
(Slovakia) I Klec	6	6
(Russia) P Chekhov	7	4	5
(Kazakhstan) A Kedryuk	6^{4}	6	7
(Ukraine) D Molchanov	6	5	3
5	(Ukraine) I Marchenko	1	7	6
3	(Ukraine) S Bubka	4	5
(Poland) G Panfil	6	7
(Australia) G Jones	6	7
(Russia) D Matsukevich	3	5
Q	(Russia) M Ledovskikh	6	6
WC	(Georgia (country)) N Basilashvili	3	4
(Japan) J Mitsuhashi	6	7
6	(Latvia) D Pavlovs	1	5

Second round
1	(Russia) M Elgin	6	7
(Slovakia) I Klec	4	5
(Kazakhstan) A Kedryuk	5	0
5	(Ukraine) I Marchenko	7	6
(Poland) G Panfil	3	6	3
(Australia) G Jones	6	3	6
Q	(Russia) M Ledovskikh	6	6
(Japan) J Mitsuhashi	4	4

Quarterfinals
1	(Russia) M Elgin	6^{4}	4
5	(Ukraine) I Marchenko	7	6
(Australia) G Jones	6	6
Q	(Russia) M Ledovskikh	4	3

Semifinals
5	(Ukraine) I Marchenko	6	6
(Australia) G Jones	4	1

=== Bottom half ===
First round
7	(Spain) I Cervantes-Huegun	6	7
Q	(Russia) M Fufygin	4	5
(Russia) V Rudnev	5	0
(Russia) I Belyaev	7	6
Q	(Russia) A Vasin	6	3	0
(Latvia) A Juška	1	6	6
Q	(Russia) S Krotiouk	2	3
4	(Russia) A Kudryavtsev	6	6
8	(Netherlands) M Middelkoop	6	6
WC	(Russia) V Dubinsky	4	3
(Russia) K Kravchuk	4
WC	(Russia) M Biryukov	1	r
WC	(Russia) A Manegin	1	3
(United Kingdom) C Eaton	6	6
(Russia) E Donskoy	3	7	4
2	(Kazakhstan) M Kukushkin	6	6^{5}	6

Second round
7	(Spain) I Cervantes-Huegun	6	6
(Russia) I Belyaev	3	3
(Latvia) A Juška	1	6^{5}
4	(Russia) A Kudryavtsev	6	7
8	(Netherlands) M Middelkoop	6	6
(Russia) K Kravchuk	2	3
(United Kingdom) C Eaton	4	0
2	(Kazakhstan) M Kukushkin	6	6

Quarterfinals
7	(Spain) I Cervantes-Huegun	2	6	6
4	(Russia) A Kudryavtsev	6	4	3
8	(Netherlands) M Middelkoop	0	6^{6}
2	(Kazakhstan) M Kukushkin	6	7

Semifinals
7	(Spain) I Cervantes-Huegun	5	0
2	(Kazakhstan) M Kukushkin	7	6
