= 2010 Penza Cup – Singles =

Singles
- 2010 Penza Cup

Final
- Champion: (Kazakhstan) Mikhail Kukushkin
- Runner-up: (Russia) Konstantin Kravchuk
- Score: 6–3, 6–7(3), 6–3

Events
Singles	Doubles
- Penza Cup

Mikhail Kukushkin successfully defended his title, defeating Konstantin Kravchuk in the final 6–3, 6–7(3), 6–3.

== Seeds ==
1. (Kazakhstan) Mikhail Kukushkin (champion)
2. (Republic of Ireland) Conor Niland (quarterfinals)
3. (Ukraine) Ivan Sergeyev (first round)
4. (Russia) Konstantin Kravchuk (final)
5. (Belarus) Uladzimir Ignatik (semifinals)
6. (Russia) Alexandre Kudryavtsev (quarterfinals)
7. (Russia) Evgeny Kirillov (second round)
8. (Spain) Iñigo Cervantes-Huegun (quarterfinals)

== Draw ==
Key

- Q = Qualifier
- WC = Wild card
- LL = Lucky loser
- Alt = Alternate
- ITF = ITF entry
- PR = Protected ranking
- SR = Special ranking
- SE = Special exempt
- JE = Junior exempt
- JR = Junior Accelerator Programme entrant
- CO = College Accelerator Programme entrant
- NG = Next Gen Accelerator Program entrant
- w/o = Walkover
- r = Retired
- d = Defaulted

=== Finals ===
Semifinals
1	(Kazakhstan) Mikhail Kukushkin	6	6
(Russia) Valery Rudnev	1	2
4	(Russia) Konstantin Kravchuk	6	7
5	(Belarus) Uladzimir Ignatik	3	6^{9}

Final
1	(Kazakhstan) Mikhail Kukushkin	6	6^{3}	6
4	(Russia) Konstantin Kravchuk	3	7	3

=== Top half ===
First round
1	(Kazakhstan) M Kukushkin	6	6
(Russia) I Belyaev	4	1
WC	(Russia) V Baluda	7	2	6^{8}
(Russia) M Ledovskikh	6^{9}	6	7
Q	(Russia) D Matsukevich	6	7
(Serbia) B Pašanski	2	6^{4}
(France) W Ludovic	5	1
6	(Russia) A Kudryavtsev	7	6
3	(Ukraine) I Sergeyev	3	6	2
(France) L Recouderc	6	3	6
(Russia) A Kumantsov	6	6
WC	(Russia) A Manegin	2	1
(Russia) V Rudnev	6^{5}	6	6
Q	(Austria) N Moser	7	4	0
(Slovakia) M Semjan	6^{8}	6	3
7	(Russia) E Kirillov	7	4	6

Second round
1	(Kazakhstan) M Kukushkin	6	6
(Russia) M Ledovskikh	2	2
Q	(Russia) D Matsukevich	3	6^{6}
6	(Russia) A Kudryavtsev	6	7
(France) L Recouderc	6	3	2
(Russia) A Kumantsov	3	6	6
(Russia) V Rudnev	7	4	6
7	(Russia) E Kirillov	6^{5}	6	3

Quarterfinals
1	(Kazakhstan) M Kukushkin	6	7
6	(Russia) A Kudryavtsev	3	6^{4}
(Russia) A Kumantsov	3	6	4
(Russia) V Rudnev	6	3	6

Semifinals
1	(Kazakhstan) M Kukushkin	6	6
(Russia) V Rudnev	1	2

=== Bottom half ===
First round
8	(Spain) I Cervantes-Huegun	6	3	6
(Romania) C Gârd	1	6	2
LL	(Russia) I Starkov	6	5	6^{3}
(Spain) A Boje-Ordóñez	4	7	7
(Serbia) D Savić	6^{3}	2
Q	(Belarus) A Bury	7	6
(Russia) M Elgin	3	6^{3}
4	(Russia) K Kravchuk	6	7
5	(Belarus) U Ignatik	6	6
WC	(Russia) I Kovalev	0	0
(Spain) G Olaso	4	4
(Ukraine) D Molchanov	6	6
(Romania) P-A Luncanu	6	5	4
Q	(Ukraine) A Smirnov	4	7	6
(Kazakhstan) A Kedryuk	5	2
2	(Republic of Ireland) C Niland	7	6

Second round
8	(Spain) I Cervantes-Huegun	6	6
(Spain) A Boje-Ordóñez	2	1
Q	(Belarus) A Bury	3	6	3
4	(Russia) K Kravchuk	6	3	6
5	(Belarus) U Ignatik	6	6
(Ukraine) D Molchanov	3	4
Q	(Ukraine) A Smirnov	4	4
2	(Republic of Ireland) C Niland	6	6

Quarterfinals
8	(Spain) I Cervantes-Huegun	5	2
4	(Russia) K Kravchuk	7	6
5	(Belarus) U Ignatik	7	6
2	(Republic of Ireland) C Niland	6^{3}	4

Semifinals
4	(Russia) K Kravchuk	6	7
5	(Belarus) U Ignatik	3	6^{9}
