= 2010 Penza Cup – Doubles =

Doubles
- 2010 Penza Cup

Final
- Champions: (Russia) Michail Elgin (Austria) Nikolaus Moser
- Runners-up: (Belarus) Alexander Bury (Belarus) Kiryl Harbatsiuk
- Score: 6–4, 6–4

Events
Singles	Doubles
- Penza Cup

Michail Elgin and Alexandre Kudryavtsev were the defending champions, but they didn't compete together.
Kudryavtsev chose to play with Evgeny Kirillov, but they lost to Uladzimir Ignatik and Konstantin Kravchuk in the quarterfinal.
Elgin partnered up with Nikolaus Moser, and together won the championship by defeating Alexander Bury and Kiryl Harbatsiuk 6–4, 6–4.

== Seeds ==
1. (Russia) Evgeny Kirillov / (Russia) Alexandre Kudryavtsev (quarterfinals)
2. (Russia) Michail Elgin / (Austria) Nikolaus Moser (champions)
3. (Ukraine) Denys Molchanov / (Ukraine) Artem Smirnov (semifinals)
4. (Russia) Andrey Kumantsov / (Serbia) David Savić (first round)

== Draw ==
Key

- Q = Qualifier
- WC = Wild card
- LL = Lucky loser
- Alt = Alternate
- ITF = ITF entry
- PR = Protected ranking
- SR = Special ranking
- SE = Special exempt
- JE = Junior exempt
- JR = Junior Accelerator Programme entrant
- CO = College Accelerator Programme entrant
- NG = Next Gen Accelerator Program entrant
- w/o = Walkover
- r = Retired
- d = Defaulted

=== Draw ===
First round
1	(Russia) E Kirillov (Russia) A Kudryavtsev	6	6
WC	(Russia) V Baluda (Russia) A Zhurbin	2	2
(Belarus) U Ignatik (Russia) K Kravchuk	6	6
(Republic of Ireland) C Niland (Ukraine) I Sergeyev	4	2
4	(Russia) A Kumantsov (Serbia) D Savić	3	4
Q	(Belarus) A Bury (Belarus) K Harbatsiuk	6	6
(Kazakhstan) M Kukushkin (Russia) V Reshetnikov	7	7
(Russia) M Ledovskikh (Serbia) B Pašanski	6^{4}	5
WC	(Russia) I Kovalev (Russia) I Shatskiy	2	2
WC	(Russia) A Manegin (Russia) V Rudnev	6	6
(Romania) C Gârd (Romania) P-A Luncanu	4	3
3	(Ukraine) D Molchanov (Ukraine) A Smirnov	6	6
(Spain) I Cervantes-Huegun (Spain) G Olaso	6^{1}	6	[14]
(Spain) A Boje-Ordóñez (France) L Recouderc	7	2	[12]
(Russia) I Belyaev (Russia) D Matsukevich	7	1	[5]
2	(Russia) M Elgin (Austria) N Moser	5	6	[10]

Quarterfinals
1	(Russia) E Kirillov (Russia) A Kudryavtsev	6^{4}	6	[4]
(Belarus) U Ignatik (Russia) K Kravchuk	7	4	[10]
Q	(Belarus) A Bury (Belarus) K Harbatsiuk	6	6
(Kazakhstan) M Kukushkin (Russia) V Reshetnikov	0	3
WC	(Russia) A Manegin (Russia) V Rudnev	3	0
3	(Ukraine) D Molchanov (Ukraine) A Smirnov	6	6
(Spain) I Cervantes-Huegun (Spain) G Olaso	3	4
2	(Russia) M Elgin (Austria) N Moser	6	6

Semifinals
(Belarus) U Ignatik (Russia) K Kravchuk	4	6	[6]
Q	(Belarus) A Bury (Belarus) K Harbatsiuk	6	3	[10]
3	(Ukraine) D Molchanov (Ukraine) A Smirnov	2	3
2	(Russia) M Elgin (Austria) N Moser	6	6

Finals
Q	(Belarus) A Bury (Belarus) K Harbatsiuk	4	4
2	(Russia) M Elgin (Austria) N Moser	6	6
