= 2012 Penza Cup =

Tennis tournament in Penza, Russia (2012)

- Date: 16–22 July
- Edition: 7th
- Surface: Hard
- Location: Penza, Russia

Champions

Singles
- (Ukraine) Illya Marchenko

Doubles
- (Russia) Konstantin Kravchuk / (Austria) Nikolaus Moser
← 2011 ·	Penza Cup	· 2013 →

The 2012 Penza Cup was a professional tennis tournament played on hard courts. It was the seventh edition of the tournament which was part of the 2012 ATP Challenger Tour. It took place in Penza, Russia between 16 and 22 July 2012.

== Singles main-draw entrants ==
=== Seeds ===
Country	Player	Rank^{1}	Seed
RUS	Alexander Kudryavtsev	168	1
RUS	Evgeny Donskoy	190	2
RUS	Konstantin Kravchuk	207	3
IND	Yuki Bhambri	220	4
SVK	Kamil Čapkovič	225	5
UKR	Denys Molchanov	268	6
RUS	Evgeny Kirillov	281	7
RUS	Andrey Kumantsov	326	8

- ^{1} Rankings are as of July 9, 2012.

=== Other entrants ===
The following players received wildcards into the singles main draw:

- (Russia) Ilya Chkoniya
- (Russia) Aslan Karatsev
- (Russia) Anton Manegin
- (Russia) Alexey Tumakov

The following players received entry as an alternate into the singles main draw:

- (Russia) Victor Baluda
- (Russia) Mikhail Fufygin

The following players received entry from the qualifying draw:

- (Russia) Mikhail Biryukov
- (Russia) Evgeny Karlovskiy
- (Russia) Richard Muzaev
- (Russia) Anton Zaitsev

== Champions ==
=== Singles ===
- (Ukraine) Illya Marchenko def. (Russia) Evgeny Donskoy, 7–5, 6–3

=== Doubles ===
- (Russia) Konstantin Kravchuk / (Austria) Nikolaus Moser def. (India) Yuki Bhambri / (India) Divij Sharan, 6–7^{(5–7)}, 6–3, [10–7]
