= 2011 Penza Cup – Doubles =

Doubles
- 2011 Penza Cup

Final
- Champions: (Spain) Arnau Brugués Davi (Tunisia) Malek Jaziri
- Runners-up: (Ukraine) Sergey Bubka (Spain) Adrián Menéndez
- Score: 6–7^{(6–8)}, 6–2, [10–8]

Events
Singles	Doubles
- Penza Cup

Mikhail Elgin and Nikolaus Moser were the defending champions, but Moser decided not to participate.
As a result, Elgin partners up with Alexander Kudryavtsev, but they withdrew prior to the tournament beginning.

Arnau Brugués Davi and Malek Jaziri won the title, defeating Sergey Bubka and Adrián Menéndez 6–7^{(6–8)}, 6–2, [10–8] in the final.

== Seeds ==
1. (Russia) Mikhail Elgin / (Russia) Alexander Kudryavtsev (withdrew)
2. (Ukraine) Sergey Bubka / (Spain) Adrián Menéndez (final)
3. (Russia) Mikhail Vasiliev / (Israel) Amir Weintraub (semifinals)
4. (Russia) Konstantin Kravchuk / (Slovakia) Lukáš Lacko (first round)

== Draw ==
Key

- Q = Qualifier
- WC = Wild card
- LL = Lucky loser
- Alt = Alternate
- ITF = ITF entry
- PR = Protected ranking
- SR = Special ranking
- SE = Special exempt
- JE = Junior exempt
- JR = Junior Accelerator Programme entrant
- CO = College Accelerator Programme entrant
- NG = Next Gen Accelerator Program entrant
- w/o = Walkover
- r = Retired
- d = Defaulted

=== Draw ===
First round
LL	(Croatia) N Mektić (Croatia) Marin Milan	7	6
(Russia) A Kumantsov (Sweden) M Ryderstedt	5	2
WC	(Russia) Illia Chkonia (Russia) Vadim Kutsenko	6	6
WC	(Russia) Timur Alshin (Russia) Alexey Tumakov	2	3
4	(Russia) K Kravchuk (Slovakia) L Lacko	2	5
(Spain) A Brugués Davi (Tunisia) M Jaziri	6	7
Q	(Russia) V Baluda (Russia) Pavel Chekhov	5	6	[6]
LL	(Russia) Vitaly Kachanovskiy (Russia) S Strelkov	7	2	[10]
(Russia) Ervand Gasparyan (Russia) Vitali Reshetnikov	1	2
(Switzerland) M Chiudinelli (Russia) D Sitak	6	6
(Belarus) Nikolai Fidirko (Russia) Sergei Krotiouk	4	2
3	(Russia) Mikhail Vasiliev (Israel) A Weintraub	6	6
WC	(Russia) Victor Komlev (Russia) Anton Zaytsev	4	7^{7}	[8]
(Russia) M Ledovskikh (Russia) Aleksandr Lobkov	6	6^{5}	[10]
(Russia) D Matsukevich (Slovakia) M Semjan	6	6^{5}	[8]
2	(Ukraine) S Bubka (Spain) A Menéndez	4	7^{7}	[10]

Quarterfinals
LL	(Croatia) N Mektić (Croatia) Marin Milan	6	6^{1}	[10]
WC	(Russia) Illia Chkonia (Russia) Vadim Kutsenko	3	7^{7}	[2]
(Spain) A Brugués Davi (Tunisia) M Jaziri	6	6
LL	(Russia) Vitaly Kachanovskiy (Russia) S Strelkov	2	3
(Switzerland) M Chiudinelli (Russia) D Sitak	2	6	[7]
3	(Russia) Mikhail Vasiliev (Israel) A Weintraub	6	3	[10]
(Russia) M Ledovskikh (Russia) Aleksandr Lobkov	0	3
2	(Ukraine) S Bubka (Spain) A Menéndez	6	6

Semifinals
LL	(Croatia) N Mektić (Croatia) Marin Milan	3	4
(Spain) A Brugués Davi (Tunisia) M Jaziri	6	6
3	(Russia) Mikhail Vasiliev (Israel) A Weintraub	6^{3}	1
2	(Ukraine) S Bubka (Spain) A Menéndez	7^{7}	6

Final
(Spain) A Brugués Davi (Tunisia) M Jaziri	6^{6}	6	[10]
2	(Ukraine) S Bubka (Spain) A Menéndez	7^{8}	2	[8]
