= 2009 Penza Cup =

- Date: July 20 – July 26
- Edition: 4th
- Location: Penza, Russia

Champions

Singles
- (Kazakhstan) Mikhail Kukushkin

Doubles
- (Russia) Mikhail Elgin / (Russia) Alexander Kudryavtsev
← 2008 ·	Penza Cup	· 2010 →

The 2009 Penza Cup was a professional tennis tournament played on Hard court. This was the fourth edition of the tournament which was part of the 2009 ATP Challenger Tour. It took place in Penza, Russia between 20 July and 26 July 2009.

== Singles entrants ==
=== Seeds ===
Nationality	Player	Ranking*	Seeding
RUS	Mikhail Elgin	132	1
KAZ	Mikhail Kukushkin	174	2
UKR	Sergei Bubka	197	3
RUS	Alexander Kudryavtsev	202	4
UKR	Illya Marchenko	242	5
LAT	Deniss Pavlovs	271	6
ESP	Iñigo Cervantes-Huegun	275	7
NED	Matwé Middelkoop	279	8

- Rankings are as of July 13, 2009.

=== Other entrants ===
The following players received wildcards into the singles main draw:

- (Georgia (country)) Nikoloz Basilashvili
- (Russia) Mikhail Biryukov
- (Russia) Vladislav Dubinsky
- (Russia) Anton Manegin

The following players received entry from the qualifying draw:

- (Russia) Mikhail Fufygin
- (Russia) Sergei Krotiouk
- (Russia) Mikhail Ledovskikh
- (Russia) Aleksander Vasin

== Champions ==
=== Singles ===
(Kazakhstan) Mikhail Kukushkin def. (Ukraine) Illya Marchenko, 6–4, 6–2

=== Doubles ===
(Russia) Mikhail Elgin / (Russia) Alexander Kudryavtsev def. (Kazakhstan) Alexey Kedryuk / (Russia) Denis Matsukevich, 4–6, 6–3, [10–6]
