= 2011 Kremlin Cup – Men's singles qualifying =

This article displays the qualifying draw of the 2011 Kremlin Cup.

== Players ==
=== Seeds ===
1. (Uzbekistan) Denis Istomin (qualifying competition)
2. (Germany) Michael Berrer (qualified)
3. (France) Jérémy Chardy (qualified)
4. (Ukraine) Illya Marchenko (second round)
5. (Croatia) Antonio Veić (qualifying competition)
6. (Russia) Konstantin Kravchuk (qualified)
7. (Germany) Mischa Zverev (qualifying competition)
8. (Serbia) Dušan Lajović (qualified)

=== Qualifiers ===
1. (Serbia) Dušan Lajović
2. (Germany) Michael Berrer
3. (France) Jérémy Chardy
4. (Russia) Konstantin Kravchuk

== Qualifying draw ==
=== First qualifier ===
First round
1	(Uzbekistan) Denis Istomin	7	7^{7}
(Russia) Evgeny Kirillov	5	6^{4}
(Russia) Ervand Gasparyan	5	7	3
(Moldova) Radu Albot	7	5	6
(Ukraine) Denys Molchanov	6	6
WC	(Russia) Ashot Khacharyan	3	3
(Netherlands) Matwé Middelkoop	5	2
8	(Serbia) Dušan Lajović	7	6

Second round
1	(Uzbekistan) Denis Istomin	4	6	6
(Moldova) Radu Albot	6	3	2
(Ukraine) Denys Molchanov	1	6^{8}
8	(Serbia) Dušan Lajović	6	7^{10}

Qualifying competition
1	(Uzbekistan) Denis Istomin	2	6	5
8	(Serbia) Dušan Lajović	6	3	7

=== Second qualifier ===
First round
2	(Germany) Michael Berrer	6	2	6
(Russia) Michail Elgin	2	6	4
(Belarus) Sergey Betov	7	6
(Uzbekistan) Murad Inoyatov	5	3
(Belarus) Alexander Bury	4	5
(Russia) Mikhail Fufygin	6	7
(Ukraine) Stanislav Poplavskyy	0	3
5	(Croatia) Antonio Veić	6	6

Second round
2	(Germany) Michael Berrer	4	6	6
(Belarus) Sergey Betov	6	2	3
(Russia) Mikhail Fufygin	2	0
5	(Croatia) Antonio Veić	6	6

Qualifying competition
2	(Germany) Michael Berrer	6	4	7^{10}
5	(Croatia) Antonio Veić	0	6	6^{8}

=== Third qualifier ===
First round
3	(France) Jérémy Chardy	6	6
WC	(Russia) Shalva Dzhanashia	3	3
WC	(Russia) Richard Muzaev	6	6
(Russia) Victor Baluda	3	1
WC	(Russia) Ilia Shatskiy	6	6
(Russia) Vitali Reshetnikov	1	2
(Russia) Denis Matsukevich	0	1
7	(Germany) Mischa Zverev	6	6

Second round
3	(France) Jérémy Chardy	6	6
WC	(Russia) Richard Muzaev	3	4
WC	(Russia) Ilia Shatskiy	1	0
7	(Germany) Mischa Zverev	6	6

Qualifying competition
3	(France) Jérémy Chardy	7	6
7	(Germany) Mischa Zverev	5	3

=== Fourth qualifier ===
First round
4	(Ukraine) Illya Marchenko	7	6
(Russia) Andrey Kumantsov	5	3
(Russia) Ilya Belyaev	5	6^{6}
(Russia) Mikhail Ledovskikh	7	7^{8}
(Ukraine) Ivan Sergeyev	4	6	3
(Russia) Alexander Rumyantsev	6	4	6
(Russia) Stanislav Vovk	4	4
6	(Russia) Konstantin Kravchuk	6	6

Second round
4	(Ukraine) Illya Marchenko	6^{5}	3
(Russia) Mikhail Ledovskikh	7^{7}	6
(Russia) Alexander Rumyantsev	0	6	2
6	(Russia) Konstantin Kravchuk	6	4	6

Qualifying competition
(Russia) Mikhail Ledovskikh	7^{7}	1	5
6	(Russia) Konstantin Kravchuk	6^{4}	6	7
