= 2010 Penza Cup =

- Date: July 19 – July 24
- Edition: 5th
- Location: Penza, Russia

Champions

Singles
- (Kazakhstan) Mikhail Kukushkin

Doubles
- (Russia) Mikhail Elgin / (Austria) Nikolaus Moser
- Penza Cup

The 2010 Penza Cup was a professional tennis tournament played on Hard court. This was the fifth edition of the tournament which is part of the 2010 ATP Challenger Tour. It took place in Penza, Russia between 19 July and 24 July 2010.

== ATP entrants ==
=== Seeds ===
Nationality	Player	Ranking*	Seeding
KAZ	Mikhail Kukushkin	96	1
IRE	Conor Niland	161	2
UKR	Ivan Sergeyev	173	3
RUS	Konstantin Kravchuk	184	4
BLR	Uladzimir Ignatik	190	5
RUS	Alexander Kudryavtsev	206	6
RUS	Evgeny Kirillov	211	7
ESP	Iñigo Cervantes-Huegun	217	8

- Rankings are as of July 12, 2010.

=== Other entrants ===
The following players received wildcards into the singles main draw:

- (Russia) Victor Baluda
- (Russia) Igor Karpov
- (Russia) Ilya Kovalev
- (Russia) Anton Manegin

The following players received entry from the qualifying draw:

- (Belarus) Aliaksandr Bury
- (Russia) Denis Matsukevich
- (Austria) Nikolaus Moser
- (Ukraine) Artem Smirnov

== Champions ==
=== Singles ===
(Kazakhstan) Mikhail Kukushkin def. (Russia) Konstantin Kravchuk, 6–3, 6–7(3), 6–3

=== Doubles ===
(Russia) Mikhail Elgin / (Austria) Nikolaus Moser def. (Belarus) Aliaksandr Bury / (Belarus) Kiryl Harbatsiuk, 6–4, 6–4
