= 2011 Penza Cup =

Tennis tournament

- Date: 18–24 July
- Edition: 6th
- Location: Penza, Russia

Champions

Singles
- (Spain) Arnau Brugués Davi

Doubles
- (Spain) Arnau Brugués Davi / (Tunisia) Malek Jaziri
- Penza Cup

The 2011 Penza Cup was a professional tennis tournament played on hard courts. It was the sixth edition of the tournament which was part of the 2011 ATP Challenger Tour. It took place in Penza, Russia between 18 and 24 July 2011.

== ATP entrants ==
=== Seeds ===
Country	Player	Rank^{1}	Seed
KAZ	Mikhail Kukushkin	67	1
RUS	Alexander Kudryavtsev	145	2
SVK	Lukáš Lacko	146	3
RUS	Konstantin Kravchuk	148	4
IRL	Conor Niland	173	5
SUI	Marco Chiudinelli	208	6
ISR	Amir Weintraub	211	7
ESP	Arnau Brugués Davi	214	8

- ^{1} Rankings are as of July 11, 2011.

=== Other entrants ===
The following players received wildcards into the singles main draw:

- (Russia) Timur Alshin
- (Russia) Illia Chkonia
- (Russia) Anton Manegin
- (Russia) Vitali Reshetnikov

The following players received entry from the qualifying draw:

- (Russia) Victor Baluda
- (Russia) Vitaly Kachanovskiy
- (Russia) Dmitri Sitak
- (Russia) Anton Zaytsev

== Champions ==
=== Singles ===
(Spain) Arnau Brugués Davi def. (Kazakhstan) Mikhail Kukushkin 4–6, 6–3, 6–2

=== Doubles ===
(Spain) Arnau Brugués Davi / (Tunisia) Malek Jaziri def. (Ukraine) Sergei Bubka / (Spain) Adrián Menéndez 6–7^{(6–8)}, 6–2, [10–8]
