= Timokhovo Landfill =

Solid waste disposal

Coordinates: 55°45′22″N 38°17′17″E

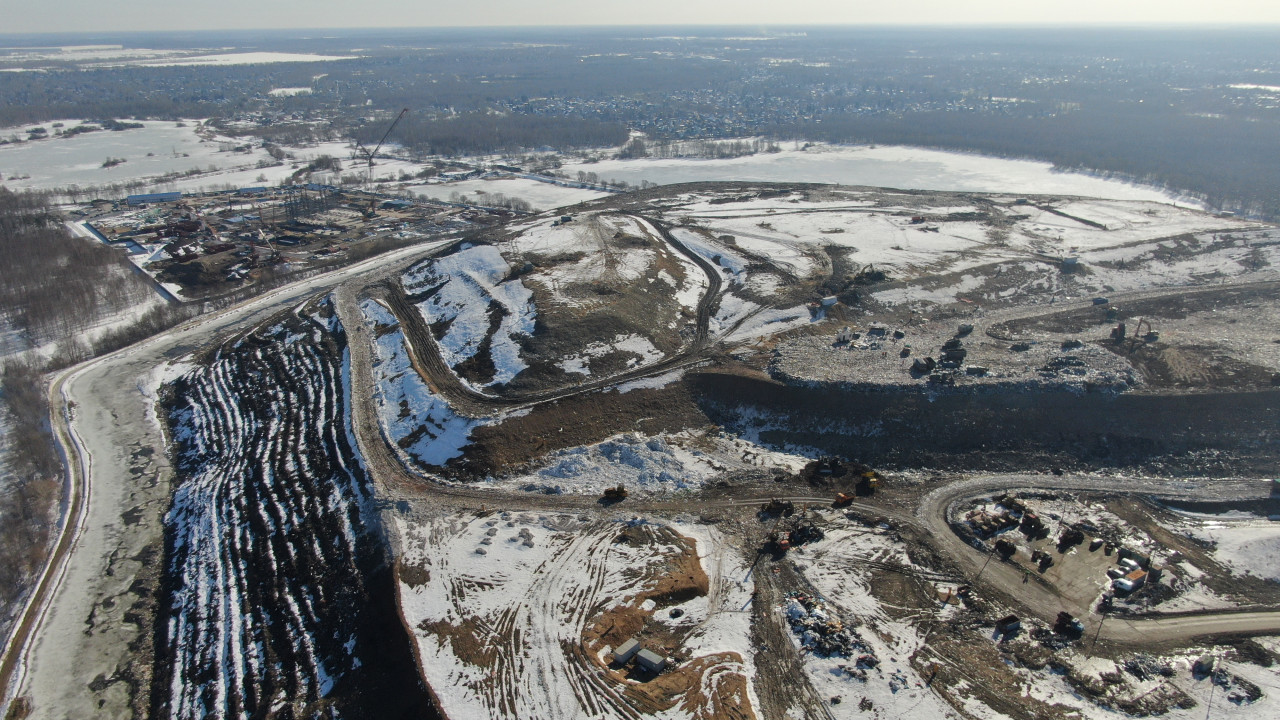
View of the landfill

Timokhovo solid waste landfill (Russian: Полигон ТБО «Тимохово») is a solid municipal waste landfill in the Bogorodsky District of the Moscow Oblast, near the village of Timokhovo. It occupies almost 114 hectares and is the largest landfill in Europe. The operating organization is OAO Poligon Timokhovo.

== History ==
The Timokhovo solid waste landfill is located in the Bogorodsky urban district of the Moscow region, 1 km south of the village of Timokhovo. It was founded in the late 1980s on the site of abandoned clay quarries and served 22 (out of 32) districts of Moscow.

The maximum capacity of the landfill is 450,000 tons per year. According to some sources, it accepts up to 1,500,000 tons per year. One of the main waste suppliers is the regional operator "Khartia" (owned by Igor Chaika).

The landfill is equipped with a radiation monitoring system, strain gauge scales, a filtrate collection and neutralization system, and a biogas collection and neutralization system.

The landfill is headed by Konstantin Sergeevich Manegin Timokhovo since 1996. In November 2017, he was arrested on charges of illegal entrepreneurship and sentenced to detention in a pretrial detention facility, then house arrest. The case under Article 171, Part 2, paragraph "b" of the Criminal Code of the Russian Federation was opened after an inspection by the Economic Crimes Department and the seizure of documents. The charges were dropped several months later.

In 2013, residents of Noginsk, Elektrostal and Elektrougli began to complain about an unpleasant smell in the air, however, the Moscow Oblast Ministry of Ecology refused to connect this with the landfill's activities. Nevertheless, Federal Service for Supervision of Natural Resources fined Timokhovo 90 thousand rubles.

In the Bizyaevka stream (Shalovka basin), flowing out of one of the ponds near the landfill, an increased content of various materials: ammonium ion by 24 times; iron by 19 times; manganese by 42 times and copper by 40 times. The Timokhovo administration admitted its guilt and stated that violations of water use rules during wastewater discharge had been eliminated. However, when an independent assessment of water intake from Bizyaevka was conducted in 2017, it turned out that the amount of ammonium ion was exceeded by 56 times, iron - by 26 times; manganese and zinc - by 17 times; copper - by 32 times.

In 2022, the Prosecutor General's Office filed a lawsuit against the Timokhovo landfill for 42 million rubles for environmental damage caused to the Bizyaevka River.

== Investigations into activities ==
On January 26, 2018, the Daily Storm publication released an investigation into the activities of the Timokhovo landfill. According to it, until 2010, the Timokhovo landfill was serviced by the Ecotrans S company. In 2007, its co-owner was Konstantin Manegin himself, in 2008 — Vladimir Blaznenkov, and by the beginning of 2009, the company was transferred to Konstantin Manegin's son — Anton Manegin. During this period, the revenue of the company "Ecotrans S" exceeded 380 million rubles per year. In 2010, the landfill began to be serviced by the company "Max", also owned by Anton Manegin. In February 2010, "Max" received a license for the disposal and placement of waste of I-IV hazard classes and began working with "Timokhovo". Every year, OOO "Max" received contracts from "Timokhovo" from 300 million rubles. From 2012 to 2014, the contract amounted to more than 1 billion rubles.

In 2014, 5 days before the tax audit of OOO "Max", a new company OOO "Ekostroy" was registered in the name of Anton Manegin. 36 of 41 employees of OOO Max transferred to it, and 26 work vehicles were also re-registered to the new company. 40 million rubles were withdrawn from the accounts of OOO Max with the note "for bonuses". By the end of 2015, when taxes should have been accrued on the activities of OOO Max, its accounts were empty. Since then, Timokhovo has been serviced by OOO Ekostroy.

The sorting shop at Timokhovo is rented by OOO Eko-Vtor. According to some sources, its founder is Konstantin Manegin's son-in-law Evgeny Yablokov.

On August 5, 2014, an agreement was signed with the company Ekokom to carry out degassing work in Timokhovo. It was decided to purchase German equipment for 30 gas collection wells, laying pipes between them, installing a power plant for processing gas and a flare for burning it. The contract value was 2.9 million euros.

In May 2016, the Moscow City Property Department decided to privatize Timokhovo; 26% of the company's shares were put up for auction, worth 91.8 million rubles. The entire landfill was thus valued at 353 million rubles, which is almost the cost of the German equipment purchased in 2014. There were only two participants in the auction: Anton Manegin and OOO Tako, owned by Manegin Sr. There was no competition, and Anton Manegin ultimately bought the shares for the minimum price of 91.8 million rubles.
