= Alexandre Krasnoroutskiy =

Russian tennis player

- Full name: Alexandre Krasnoroutskiy
- Country (sports): Russia
- Born: 17 June 1987 (age 38) Kerch, Ukraine
- Plays: Right-handed
- Prize money: $36,904

Singles
- Highest ranking: No. 705 (10 July 2006)

Doubles
- Highest ranking: No. 156 (1 October 2007)
Medal record
Summer Universiade
Tennis
Silver medal – second place	2007 Bangkok	Men's Doubles
Silver medal – second place	2007 Bangkok	Mixed Doubles

Alexandre Krasnoroutskiy (born 17 June 1987) is a former professional tennis player from Russia.

== Biography ==
Krasnoroutskiy was born in the Crimean city of Kerch, the younger brother of Lina Krasnoroutskaya, who played professionally on the women's circuit. He was coached by his father Vladimir. As a junior he was ranked in the world's top 100 and made the round of 16 in the boys' singles at the 2005 French Open.

While at college he represented Russia at the 2007 Summer Universiade in Bangkok, where he won silver medals in both the men's and mixed doubles events, with Pavel Chekhov and Alisa Kleybanova respectively.

His professional career was mostly as a doubles player, he was ranked as high as 156 in the format and won a total of five doubles titles on the Challenger tour.

Krasnoroutskiy has worked as the hitting partner for several Russian players including Svetlana Kuznetsova and Ekaterina Makarova. He has also been involved as a coach with Russia's Olga Doroshina.

== Challenger titles ==
=== Doubles: (5) ===
No.	Year	Tournament	Surface	Partner	Opponents	Score
1.	2007	Penza, Russia	Hard	(Russia) Alexander Kudryavtsev	(Uzbekistan) Murad Inoyatov (Uzbekistan) Denis Istomin	6–1, 4–6, 10–4
2.	2007	Ljubljana, Slovenia	Clay	(Russia) Alexander Kudryavtsev	(Bosnia and Herzegovina) Ivan Dodig (Croatia) Lovro Zovko	7–6^{(11–9)}, 1–6, 10–6
3.	2007	Banja Luka, Bosnia & Herzegovina	Clay	(Russia) Alexander Kudryavtsev	(Argentina) Diego Junqueira (Serbia) Vladimir Obradović	6–2, 6–4
4.	2008	Almaty, Kazakhstan	Clay	(Ukraine) Denys Molchanov	(Kazakhstan) Syrym Abdukhalikov (United States) Alex Bogomolov Jr.	3–6, 6–3, 10–2
5.	2008	Cherkasy, Ukraine	Clay	(Russia) Mikhail Elgin	(Ukraine) Sergei Bubka (Ukraine) Sergiy Stakhovsky	6–4, 7–5
