= Arnau Brugués Davi =

Spanish tennis player (born 1985)

- Country (sports): Spain
- Residence: Spain
- Born: 5 March 1985 (age 40) Vic, Barcelona, Spain
- Height: 6 ft 0 in (183 cm)
- Turned pro: 2009
- Plays: Left-handed (two-handed backhand)
- College: Tulsa
- Prize money: $222,854

Singles
- Career record: 1–3
- Career titles: 0
- Highest ranking: No. 135 (7 November 2011)

Grand Slam singles results
- Australian Open: 1R (2013)
- French Open: Q1 (2010, 2012, 2013)
- Wimbledon: Q2 (2012)
- US Open: Q1 (2011, 2012)

Doubles
- Career record: 0–0
- Career titles: 0
- Highest ranking: No. 238 (16 July 2012)
- Last updated on: 29 December 2021.

Arnau Brugués Davi (born 5 March 1985, in Spain) is a retired professional tennis player from Spain.

He graduated from the University of Tulsa in 2009. A four-time All-American and four-time Conference USA player of the year. Won the 2006 Polo Ralph Lauren All-American Tennis Championship, marking the first national championship won by a Tulsa tennis player or a Conference USA tennis athlete, he defeated John Isner in the finals 7/6 6/4. He was ranked as high as No. 1 in singles and No. 3 in doubles. Inducted into the Conference USA hall of fame in July 2019, and the University of Tulsa hall of fame in April 2023.

He won seventeen ITF Futures tournaments on hard courts in his career, however his best achievements are singles and doubles titles in 2011 Penza Cup (ATP Challenger Tour). Then he defeated Mikhail Kukushkin and Sergey Bubka / Adrián Menéndez in the finals. In May 2012 he set a new record in ITF Pro Circuit action for most consecutive singles main draw victories, a total of 44 wins in a row. With the victory in the final of the Turkey F17 tournament held in Antalya-Belconti, Brugués moved onto 40 match wins, surpassing Eduardo Schwank's record of 39 wins.

== ATP Challenger and ITF Futures Finals ==
=== Singles: 23 (17–6) ===
Legend ATP Challenger (1–1) ITF Futures (16–5)	Finals by surface Hard (17–5) Clay (0–1) Grass (0–0) Carpet (0–0)

Result	W–L	Date	Tournament	Tier	Surface	Opponent	Score
Win	1–0	Jul 2008	USA F19, Godfrey	Futures	Hard	(Norway) Erling Tveit	6–1, ret.
Loss	1–1	Jun 2009	Malaysia F1, Kuala Lumpur	Futures	Hard	(Italy) Luigi D'Agord	3–6, 5–7
Loss	1–2	Jul 2009	USA F18, Joplin	Futures	Hard	(United States) Blake Strode	1–6, 3–6
Win	2–2	Aug 2009	USA F20, Decatur	Futures	Hard	(Australia) Matt Reid	7–5, 6–2
Loss	2–3	Sep 2009	Bolivia F2, Cochabamba	Futures	Clay	(Argentina) Guido Pella	2–6, 7–6^{(7–3)}, 6–7^{(5–7)}
Win	3–3	Sep 2009	Mexico F9, León	Futures	Hard	(Mexico) Juan Manuel Elizondo	7–5, 6–2
Win	4–3	Oct 2009	USA F26, Mansfield	Futures	Hard	(Mexico) Bruno Rodríguez	6–0, 6–3
Win	5–3	Feb 2010	Mexico F1, Mexico City	Futures	Hard	(Mexico) Miguel Gallardo Valles	6–2, 6–4
Win	6–3	Feb 2010	USA F6, Harlingen	Futures	Hard	(Russia) Andrey Kumantsov	7–6^{(7–2)}, 6–3
Win	7–3	Feb 2011	France F2, Feucherolles	Futures	Hard	(France) Fabrice Martin	2–6, 6–3, 7–5
Loss	7–4	Feb 2011	France F3, Bressuire	Futures	Hard	(Belgium) Maxime Authom	4–6, 4–6
Win	8–4	Apr 2011	USA F8, Oklahoma City	Futures	Hard	(Bulgaria) Dimitar Kutrovsky	7–5, 6–1
Win	9–4	Apr 2011	USA F9, Little Rock	Futures	Hard	(United Kingdom) Alex Bogdanovic	6–3, 6–1
Win	10–4	Apr 2011	Turkey F14, Antalya	Futures	Hard	(Slovakia) Jozef Kovalík	7–5, 6–2
Win	11–4	May 2011	Turkey F15, Antalya	Futures	Hard	(Germany) Stefan Seifert	6–3, 6–1
Win	12–4	Jun 2011	Spain F18, Madrid	Futures	Hard	(Republic of Ireland) James McGee	7–5, 6–7^{(3–7)}, 7–6^{(7–0)}
Win	13–4	Jun 2011	Spain F20, Martos	Futures	Hard	(Spain) Andrés Artuñedo	6–2, 6–3
Win	14–4	Jul 2011	Spain F22, Palma del Río	Futures	Hard	(Slovakia) Miloslav Mečíř	6–1, 6–3
Win	15–4	Jul 2011	Penza, Russia	Challenger	Hard	(Kazakhstan) Mikhail Kukushkin	4–6, 6–3, 6–2
Win	16–4	May 2012	Turkey F17, Antalya	Futures	Hard	(Australia) Brydan Klein	6–2, 6–4
Loss	16–5	May 2012	Turkey F18, Antalya	Futures	Hard	(Germany) Robin Kern	3–6, 6–7^{(4–7)}
Win	17–5	Jul 2012	Spain F18, Palma del Río	Futures	Hard	(United Kingdom) Joshua Milton	6–1, 6–1
Loss	17–6	Aug 2012	Pozoblanco, Spain	Challenger	Hard	(Spain) Roberto Bautista Agut	3–6, 4–6

=== Doubles: 8 (5–3) ===
Legend ATP Challenger (2–1) ITF Futures (3–2)	Finals by surface Hard (4–2) Clay (1–1) Grass (0–0) Carpet (0–0)

Result	W–L	Date	Tournament	Tier	Surface	Partner	Opponents	Score
Win	1–0\	Jun 2009	Malaysia F1, Kuala Lumpur	Futures	Hard	(Italy) Luigi D'Agord	(Chinese Taipei) Lee Hsin-han (Chinese Taipei) Yang Tsung-hua	7–6^{(4–7)}, 6–4
Win	2–0\	Jun 2009	Malaysia F2, Petaling Jaya	Futures	Hard	(Italy) Luigi D'Agord	(Chinese Taipei) Chen Ti (United States) Phillip King	6–2, 6–3
Loss	2–1	Jan 2010	USA F2, Hollywood	Futures	Clay	(Dominican Republic) Víctor Estrella Burgos	(Italy) Stefano Ianni (Italy) Matteo Viola	7–6^{(7–1)}, 1–6, [7–10]
Win	3–1	Feb 2010	USA F5, Brownsville	Futures	Hard	(Dominican Republic) Víctor Estrella Burgos	(United States) Brett Joelson (United States) Christopher Klingemann	7–6^{(7–2)}, 6–3
Loss	3–2	Jun 2011	Spain F18, Madrid	Futures	Hard	(Spain) Israel Vior-Diaz	(China) Xiao Qi (China) Yingzheng Wang	3–6, 4–6
Win	4–2	Jul 2011	Penza, Russia	Challenger	Hard	(Tunisia) Malek Jaziri	(Ukraine) Sergey Bubka (Spain) Adrián Menéndez Maceiras	6–7^{(6–8)}, 6–2, [10–8]
Loss	4–3	Jul 2011	Astana, Kazakhstan	Challenger	Hard	(Tunisia) Malek Jaziri	(Russia) Konstantin Kravchuk (Ukraine) Denys Molchanov	6–7^{(4–7)}, 7–6^{(7–1)}, [3–10]
Win	5–3	Jun 2012	Furth, Germany	Challenger	Clay	(Portugal) João Sousa	(Australia) Rameez Junaid (India) Purav Raja	7–5, 6–7^{(4–7)}, [11–9]

== Performance timeline ==
Key
W	F	SF	QF	#R	RR	Q#	DNQ	A	NH

(W) winner; (F) finalist; (SF) semifinalist; (QF) quarterfinalist; (#R) rounds 4, 3, 2, 1; (RR) round-robin stage; (Q#) qualification round; (DNQ) did not qualify; (A) absent; (NH) not held; (SR) strike rate (events won / competed); (W–L) win–loss record.

=== Singles ===
Tournament	2010	2011	2012	2013	SR	W–L	Win %
Grand Slam tournaments
Australian Open	A	Q3	Q2	1R	0 / 1	0–1	0%
French Open	Q1	A	Q1	Q1	0 / 0	0–0	–
Wimbledon	Q1	A	Q2	Q1	0 / 0	0–0	–
US Open	A	Q1	Q1	A	0 / 0	0–0	–
Win–loss	0–0	0–0	0–0	0–1	0 / 1	0–1	0%
ATP World Tour Masters 1000
Indian Wells Masters	A	A	Q1	A	0 / 0	0–0	–
Miami Open	A	A	Q1	A	0 / 0	0–0	–
Monte Carlo Masters	A	A	Q1	A	0 / 0	0–0	–
Madrid Open	Q1	A	A	Q1	0 / 0	0–0	–
Win–loss	0–0	0–0	0–0	0–0	0 / 0	0–0	–
