= Illya Marchenko =

Ukrainian tennis player (born 1987)

Illya Marchenko Ілля Марченко
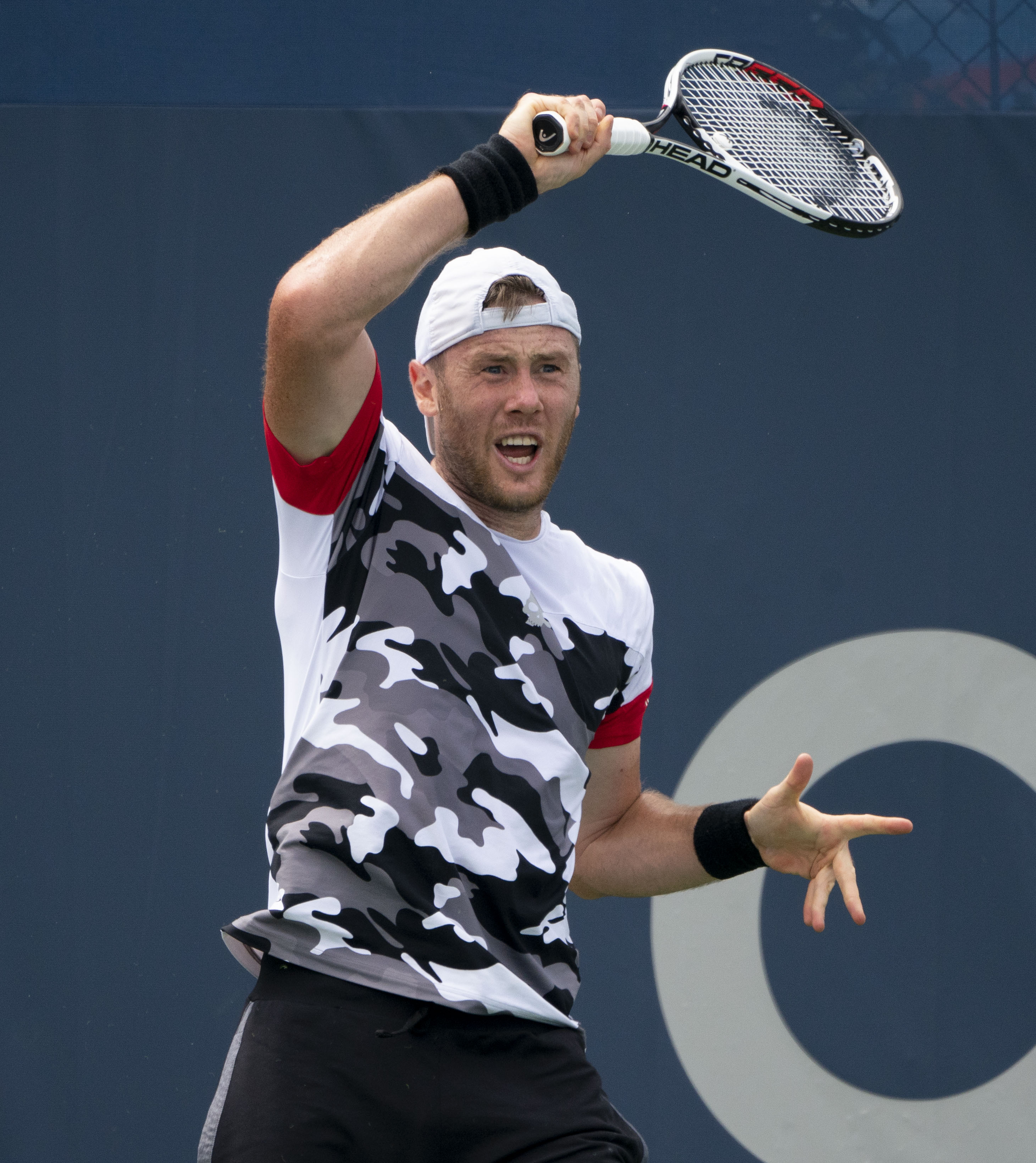
- Marchenko in 2018
- Country (sports): Ukraine
- Residence: Bratislava, Slovakia
- Born: 8 September 1987 (age 39) Dniprodzerzhynsk, Ukrainian SSR, Soviet Union
- Height: 1.85 m (6 ft 1 in)
- Turned pro: 2006
- Plays: Right-handed (two-handed backhand)
- Coach: Orest Tereschuk (2009–2014); Tibor Toth (2014–2021); Filip Havaj (2021–)
- Prize money: US $2,490,282

Singles
- Career record: 68–96
- Career titles: 0
- Highest ranking: No. 49 (26 September 2016)

Grand Slam singles results
- Australian Open: 2R (2010, 2011)
- French Open: 1R (2010, 2013, 2015, 2016)
- Wimbledon: 2R (2010)
- US Open: 4R (2016)

Doubles
- Career record: 6–14
- Career titles: 0
- Highest ranking: No. 268 (25 August 2014)
- Last updated on: 1 October 2025.

Illya Vasylovych Marchenko (Ukrainian: Ілля Васильович Марченко; born 8 September 1987) is a Ukrainian tennis player. He has a career high in singles of World No. 49 achieved on 26 September 2016 and of No. 268 in doubles achieved on 25 August 2014. On the ATP Tour, Marchenko reached the semifinals of Moscow in 2009, the 2010 St. Petersburg Open and Doha in 2016.

He is noted for his backhand, which he cites as his best shot. His favorite surface is hardcourts.

Founder of a coaching performance team IM Tennis

== Personal life ==
Illya began playing tennis at age seven. His father Vassili and mother Anna are both engineers. Has one older brother, Igor Marchenko, a manager and former ice skater who took part in the 1998 Winter Olympics. Growing up, he admired Lleyton Hewitt and Roger Federer. He has played doubles on the Futures level with fellow Ukrainian Artem Smirnov. He was coached by Orest Tereschuk from July 2009 till 2014 and by Tibor Toth from 2014. Marchenko also has a YouTube channel with close to 3,000 subscribers and 150,000 views where he posts tennis-related content.

== Professional career ==
=== 2005–2008 ===
Marchenko turned professional in 2005 and played mostly on the ITF Futures circuit and Challengers level from 2005 to 2008.

In 2006, he reached his first Futures final (Nigeria F5) and won his first futures title a week later (Nigeria F6). He then attempted to qualify for his first ATP World Tour event in Marseille, but lost in the first round of qualification to Jérémy Chardy.

In 2007, Marchenko reached his third Futures final (Belarus F2) before losing to Russian Mikhail Elgin. Again, attempting to qualify for the main draw of an ATP World Tour event, Marchenko lost in the second round of the Kremlin Cup qualifiers in Moscow, and the final round of the St. Petersburg Open qualifier a week later.

In 2008, Marchenko reached his fourth Futures final (Russia F2) before bowing out to Pavel Chekhov in the final. In May, Marchenko reached the semi-final of the Türk Telecom İzmir Cup Challenger in Turkey before losing to eventual champion Gilles Müller. This was his best Challenger performance to date.

In August 2008, however, Marchenko topped out his previous Challenger performances by reaching the final of the Bukhara Challenger in Uzbekistan before losing to hometown favorite Denis Istomin in 3 sets. Marchenko then closed out his year with solid performances in two Ukrainian Challengers, reaching the Quarterfinals and Semifinals in each, respectively. Marchenko played his first Davis Cup tie in 2008, winning his only rubber.

=== 2009 ===
In March, Marchenko played his first live rubber in Davis Cup after being selected as second singles man for the Ukrainian team in the tie versus Great Britain. Marchenko defeated Josh Goodall, Britain's first singles man in the absence of Andy Murray in straight sets. Ukraine went on to win the tie after claiming victory in the doubles rubber (contested by Sergiy Stakhovsky and Sergei Bubka for Ukraine and Ross Hutchins and Colin Fleming for Great Britain). Marchenko played the fifth dead rubber against Chris Eaton and lost.

Marchenko played his first ATP World Tour match in Marseille after winning 3 rounds of qualification. However, he lost to Mischa Zverev in 3 sets, despite winning the first set. In May, Marchenko reached the semifinal of the Fergana Challenger in Uzbekistan, before reaching the final of the Penza Cup Challenger in Russia (losing to Mikhail Kukushkin in the final).

In August, Marchenko won the Istanbul Challenger in Turkey, beating 4 players ranked inside the Top 200 best of the world, including Karol Beck (ranked #100 at the time). Marchenko beat Florian Mayer to win the title, the first Challenger title of his entire career (singles or doubles).

Marchenko attempted to qualify for the first time into the main draw of a Grand Slam at the 2009 US Open, but lost to Marco Chiudinelli in the final round of qualification.

In October, Marchenko won 6 matches in a row before losing to countryman Sergiy Stakhovsky in the semi-final of the Mons Challenger in Belgium. He followed his good form at the Kremlin Cup event in Moscow, Russia. After winning three rounds of qualification matches, Marchenko reached his second ever ATP World Tour main draw. He then beat Denis Istomin in his first match, Andrey Golubev in his second match, and Evgeny Korolev in his quarterfinal match to reach his first ATP World Tour semifinal. This run in Moscow was Marchenko's best ATP result thus far. However, he lost to Serbia's Janko Tipsarević. He then played at the 2009 St. Petersburg Open, where he won his first round match against 56th ranked Fabio Fognini. He lost to second seeded Victor Hănescu in the Round of 16.

In November, Marchenko reached his fourth ATP Challenger Tour final. At the 2009 edition of the Presidents Cup in Astana, Kazakhstan, after defeating Björn Phau in the semifinals of the indoor hardcourt tournament, Marchenko bowed out to Andrey Golubev.

=== 2010 ===
Marchenko started 2010 by qualifying for the 2010 Australian Open. In the first round he beat former world No. 1 Carlos Moyá, before falling to World No. 6 Nikolay Davydenko in the second round. Marchenko then travelled to Zagreb in February 2010 and made it to the quarterfinals after defeating Simone Bolelli and Ivan Dodig before losing to Jürgen Melzer. The same month he also travelled to Marseille and qualified. After beating Ruben Bemelmans and Olivier Rochus he faced top-10 seed Jo-Wilfried Tsonga in the quarterfinals. He subsequently lost the match.

In March 2010 he qualified for the ATP World Tour Masters 1000 in Miami. He beat Paul-Henri Mathieu in the first round but was defeated by Tommy Robredo in the second round. Much of the year was pretty much the same for Marchenko, just missing out in qualifying or bowing out in the first or second rounds of tournaments. In October he earned 90 ATP ranking points at the 2010 St. Petersburg Open after reaching the semifinals, losing to eventual champion Mikhail Kukushkin.

=== 2011 ===
Marchenko started the year 2011 ranked No. 81. He qualified for the 2011 Australian Open. He beat Rubén Ramírez Hidalgo in the first round, but was beaten in straight sets by World No. 5 Andy Murray in the second round.

=== 2013 ===
In Bogota at the 2013 Claro Open Colombia, Marchenko played a first round hard court match against Matteo Viola and lost 3–6, 6–2, 0–6. He had a total of 12 double faults. In the 2nd and 3rd sets, he had 13 second serves and double faulted on 9 of them. In the deciding set alone, he double faulted 6 out of 9 times when faced with a second serve.

=== 2016: First top-10 win, US Open fourth round, Top 50 debut ===
Early 2016 marked a real boost in Marchenko's career. At the 2016 Qatar ExxonMobil Open he managed to defeat three top 50 players, including a first round win against the defending champion David Ferrer, much against all expectations. This also marked the first victory against a top-10 player of his career. He lost to second seed Rafael Nadal in the semifinals.

He lost in the first round of the 2016 Australian Open to Australian wildcard Omar Jasika, ranked No. 310. Marchenko beat Ivan Dodig in the first round of the 2016 US Open in four sets. Marchenko then beat Damir Džumhur in straight sets. Marchenko was leading opponent and 14th seed Nick Kyrgios 4–6, 6–1, 6–4 when Kyrgios retired with a hip injury. Marchenko then lost in four sets to third seed Stan Wawrinka in the fourth round, his best showing at a Grand Slam in his career. As a result he made his top 50 debut on 12 September 2016.

=== 2020–2021: Eight Challenger title ===
After struggling for the entirety of 2020, which included in the beginning of the season a cancelled Challenger final due to COVID-19 concerns in Bergamo, Italy Marchenko was able to once again find success at the 2021 Biella Challenger Indoor, also in Italy a year later. He defeated the fifth seed and former World No. 24 Martin Kližan in straight sets in the first round. In the quarterfinals he won a tight three-setter against fourth seed Lorenzo Giustino. In the semifinals he defeated the second seed Federico Gaio 7–5, 6–1. In the final, Marchenko upset the top seed and former World No. 1 Andy Murray 6–2, 6–4 to win his first ATP Challenger-level title since 2019.

=== 2022–2024: Tenth Challenger title ===
At the 2023 Hamburg Ladies & Gents Cup Marchenko defeated top seed Dennis Novak to lift his tenth Challenger title.

=== Davis Cup ===
Marchenko made his Davis Cup debut in 2008 at the age of 21. During his time with the Ukrainian Davis Cup team, he posted a win–loss record of 17–13 in singles, 1–0 in doubles, and 18–13 overall.

=== 2024 ===
In 2024, Marchenko was nominated as the captain of the Ukraine BJK Cup Team..

=== 2025 ===
In 2025 Illya stopped playing professional tournaments and is more focused on coaching. Working as a private coach with Katarina Zavatska and Nadiia Kichenok.

At the beginning of 2026 Illya Marchenko has founded a professional team of independent tennis and fitness coaches IM Tennis. His team of coaches based mostly in Bratislava and includes strong former players like Ivan Sergeyev and Kristína Kučová.

== Challenger and Futures finals ==
=== Singles: 25 (12 titles, 12 runner-ups, 1 not contested) ===
Legend (singles) ATP Challenger Tour (10–9) ITF Futures Tour (2–3)	Titles by surface Hard (12–11) Clay (0–0) Grass (0–0) Carpet (0–1)

Result	W–L	Date	Tournament	Tier	Surface	Opponent	Score
Loss	0–1	Oct 2006	Nigeria F5, Lagos	Futures	Hard	(Bosnia and Herzegovina) Ivan Dodig	3–6, 4–6
Win	1–1	Oct 2006	Nigeria F6, Lagos	Futures	Hard	(Togo) Komlavi Loglo	7–5, 6–3
Loss	1–2	May 2007	Belarus F2, Minsk	Futures	Hard	(Russia) Mikhail Elgin	3–6, 2–6
Loss	1–3	Apr 2008	Russia F2, Tyumen	Futures	Carpet (i)	(Russia) Pavel Chekhov	6–7^{(4–7)}, 4–6
Loss	1–4	Aug 2008	Bukhara, Uzbekistan	Challenger	Hard	(Uzbekistan) Denis Istomin	6–4, 1–6, 4–6
Loss	1–5	Jul 2009	Penza, Russia	Challenger	Hard	(Kazakhstan) Mikhail Kukushkin	4–6, 2–6
Win	2–5	Aug 2009	Istanbul, Turkey	Challenger	Hard	(Germany) Florian Mayer	6–4, 6–4
Loss	2–6	Nov 2009	Astana, Kazakhstan	Challenger	Hard (i)	(Kazakhstan) Andrey Golubev	3–6, 3–6
Win	3–6	Jul 2012	Kazakhstan F6, Almaty	Futures	Hard	(Belarus) Egor Gerasimov	6–4, 6–2
Win	4–6	Jul 2012	Penza, Russia	Challenger	Hard	(Russia) Evgeny Donskoy	7–5, 6–3
Loss	4–7	Sep 2012	İzmir, Turkey	Challenger	Hard	(Russia) Dmitry Tursunov	6–7^{(4–7)}, 7–6^{(7–5)}, 3–6
Loss	4–8	Oct 2012	Rennes, France	Challenger	Hard	(France) Kenny de Schepper	6–7^{(4–7)}, 2–6
Loss	4–9	Nov 2012	Tyumen, Russia	Challenger	Hard	(Russia) Evgeny Donskoy	7–6^{(8–6)}, 3–6, 2–6
Loss	4–10	Sep 2013	Istanbul, Turkey	Challenger	Hard	(Kazakhstan) Mikhail Kukushkin	3–6, 3–6
Win	5–10	Nov 2014	Brescia, Italy	Challenger	Hard (i)	(Uzbekistan) Farrukh Dustov	6–4, 5–7, 6–2
Win	6–10	Oct 2015	Mons, Belgium	Challenger	Hard (i)	(Germany) Benjamin Becker	6–2, 6–7^{(8–10)}, 6–4
Win	7–10	Jul 2016	Recanati, Italy	Challenger	Hard	(Belarus) Ilya Ivashka	6–4, 6–4
Loss	7–11	Jul 2016	Segovia, Spain	Challenger	Hard	(Italy) Luca Vanni	4–6, 6–3, 3–6
Win	8–11	Sep 2017	İzmir, Turkey	Challenger	Hard	(France) Stéphane Robert	7–6^{(7–2)}, 6–0
Win	9–11	Oct 2019	Nur-Sultan, Kazakhstan	Challenger	Hard (i)	(Germany) Yannick Maden	4–6, 6–3, 6–4
NC	9–11	Feb 2020	Bergamo, Italy	Challenger	Hard	(France) Enzo Couacaud	Final cancelled (Note: Final cancelled due to COVID-19 pandemic.)
Win	10–11	Feb 2021	Biella, Italy	Challenger	Hard (i)	(United Kingdom) Andy Murray	6–2, 6–4
Win	11–11	Jul 2023	Salinas, Ecuador	Challenger	Hard	(Croatia) Matija Pecotić	6–4, 6–4
Win	12-11	Oct 2023	Hamburg, Germany	Challenger	Hard	(Austria) Dennis Novak	6–2, 6–3
Loss	12-12	May 2024	Taipei, Taiwan	Challenger	Hard	(Australia) Adam Walton	6–3, 2–6, 6–7^{(3–7)}

=== Doubles: 5 (3–2) ===
Legend
ATP Challenger Tour (3–2)

Outcome	W–L	Date	Tournament	Surface	Partner	Opponents	Score
Runner-up	0–1	12 May 2008	New Delhi, India	Hard	(Kuwait) Mohammad Al-Ghareeb	(Australia) Colin Ebelthite (Australia) Sam Groth	6–2, 6–7^{(5–7)}, 8–10
Runner-up	0–2	4 July 2011	Pozoblanco, Spain	Hard	(Ukraine) Denys Molchanov	(Russia) Mikhail Elgin (Russia) Alexander Kudryavtsev	W/O
Winner	1–2	23 September 2013	Orléans, France	Hard(i)	(Ukraine) Sergiy Stakhovsky	(Lithuania) Ričardas Berankis (Croatia) Franko Škugor	7–5, 6–3
Winner	2–2	10 November 2014	Brescia, Italy	Carpet(i)	(Ukraine) Denys Molchanov	(Czech Republic) Roman Jebavý (Poland) Błażej Koniusz	7–6^{(7–4)}, 6–3
Winner	3-2	5 October 2019	Nur-Sultan, Kazakhstan	Hard(i)	(Finland) Harri Heliövaara	(Poland) Karol Drzewiecki (Poland) Szymon Walków	6–4, 6–4

== Grand Slam performance timeline ==
Key
W	F	SF	QF	#R	RR	Q#	DNQ	A	NH

(W) winner; (F) finalist; (SF) semifinalist; (QF) quarterfinalist; (#R) rounds 4, 3, 2, 1; (RR) round-robin stage; (Q#) qualification round; (DNQ) did not qualify; (A) absent; (NH) not held; (SR) strike rate (events won / competed); (W–L) win–loss record.
To avoid confusion and double counting, these charts are updated at the conclusion of a tournament or when the player's participation has ended.

Current through the 2024 Australian Open.

Tournament	2009	2010	2011	2012	2013	2014	2015	2016	2017	2018	2019	2020	2021	2022	2023	2024	W–L
Grand Slam tournaments
Australian Open	Q1	2R	2R	1R	A	Q3	1R	1R	1R	A	A	A	Q1	Q1		Q1	2–6
French Open	A	1R	Q2	A	1R	Q1	1R	1R	A	Q1	Q1	Q1	Q3	A		A	0–4
Wimbledon	A	2R^{[a]}	1R	Q1	Q2	Q1	A	1R	1R	Q1	Q2	NH	Q2	Q2		Q1	1–3
US Open	Q3	1R	A	Q1	Q2	2R	2R	4R	Q1	Q1	A	A	Q1	A		A	5–4
Win–loss	0–0	2–3	1–2	0–1	0–1	1–1	1–3	3–4	0–2	0–0	0–0	0–0	0–0	0–0	0–0	0–0	8–17

^{a} 2010 Wimbledon counts as 1 win, 0 loss. Gilles Simon received a walkover in round 2, after Marchenko withdrew because of a shoulder injury. This does not count as a Marchenko loss, nor a Simon win.

== Top 10 wins ==
Season	2016	Total
Wins	1	1

#	Player	Rank	Event	Surface	Rd	Score	IMR
2016
1.	(Spain) David Ferrer	7	Doha, Qatar	Hard	1R	6–7^{(8–10)}, 6–3, 6–2	94
