= Penza Cup =

- 2012 Penza Cup

Defunct tennis tournament
- Event name: Penza
- Location: Penza, Russia
- Category: ATP Challenger Tour
- Surface: Hard
- Draw: 32S/20Q/16D
- Prize money: $35,000+H

The Penza Cup was a professional tennis tournament played on outdoor hard courts. It was part of the ATP Challenger Tour, with the tournament being held annually in Penza, Russia, from 2006 to 2012.

== Past finals ==
=== Singles ===
Year	Champion	Runner-up	Score
2012	(Ukraine) Illya Marchenko	(Russia) Evgeny Donskoy	7–5, 6–3
2011	(Spain) Arnau Brugués Davi	(Kazakhstan) Mikhail Kukushkin	4–6, 6–3, 6–2
2010	(Kazakhstan) Mikhail Kukushkin	(Russia) Konstantin Kravchuk	6–3, 6–7(3), 6–3
2009	(Kazakhstan) Mikhail Kukushkin	(Ukraine) Illya Marchenko	6–4, 6–2
2008	(Germany) Benedikt Dorsch	(Ukraine) Sergiy Stakhovsky	1–6, 6–4, 7–6(6)
2007	(Germany) Benedikt Dorsch	(Russia) Mikhail Ledovskikh	7–5, 5–7, 6–1
2006	(Uzbekistan) Farrukh Dustov	(Chinese Taipei) Chen Ti	5–7, 6–2, 6–4

=== Doubles ===
Year	Champions	Runners-up	Score
2012	(Russia) Konstantin Kravchuk (Austria) Nikolaus Moser	(India) Yuki Bhambri (India) Divij Sharan	6–7^{(5–7)}, 6–3, [10–7]
2011	(Spain) Arnau Brugués Davi (Tunisia) Malek Jaziri	(Ukraine) Sergei Bubka (Spain) Adrián Menéndez	6–7(8), 6–2, [10–8]
2010	(Russia) Mikhail Elgin (Austria) Nikolaus Moser	(Belarus) Aliaksandr Bury (Belarus) Kiryl Harbatsiuk	6–4, 6–4
2009	(Russia) Mikhail Elgin (Russia) Alexander Kudryavtsev	(Kazakhstan) Alexey Kedryuk (Russia) Denis Matsukevich	4–6, 6–3, [10–6]
2008	(Uzbekistan) Denis Istomin (Russia) Evgeny Kirillov	(Brazil) André Ghem (Netherlands) Boy Westerhof	6–2, 3–6, 10–6
2007	(Russia) Alexandre Krasnoroutskiy (Russia) Alexander Kudryavtsev	(Uzbekistan) Murad Inoyatov (Uzbekistan) Denis Istomin	6–1, 4–6, 10–4
2006	(Uzbekistan) Murad Inoyatov (Uzbekistan) Denis Istomin	(Russia) Denis Matsukevich (Russia) Artem Sitak	6–1, 6–3
