= Nikolaus Moser =

Austrian tennis player (born 1990)

- Country (sports): Austria
- Residence: Vienna, Austria
- Born: 21 March 1990 (age 36) Vienna, Austria
- Plays: Right-handed (two-handed backhand)
- Prize money: US$73,570

Singles
- Career record: 0–0
- Career titles: 0; 0 Challenger, 4 Futures
- Highest ranking: No. 401 (4 October 2010)

Doubles
- Career record: 0–2
- Career titles: 0; 3 Challenger, 12 Futures
- Highest ranking: No. 183 (8 November 2010)
- Last updated on: 15 July 2021.

Nikolaus Moser (German pronunciation: [ˈnɪkolaʊ̯s ˈmoːzɐ, ˈniː-]; born 21 March 1990) is a former Austrian tennis player.

Along with Cedrik-Marcel Stebe he won the 2008 US Open – Boys' doubles title.

== ATP Challenger and ITF Futures finals ==
=== Singles: 8 (4–4) ===
Legend ATP Challenger (0–0) ITF Futures (4–4)	Finals by surface Hard (3–4) Clay (1–0) Grass (0–0) Carpet (0–0)

Result	W–L	Date	Tournament	Tier	Surface	Opponent	Score
Win	1–0	Nov 2008	Dominican Republic F1, Santo Domingo	Futures	Hard	(Belgium) David Goffin	6–4, 6–3
Win	2–0	Jul 2009	Venezuela F5, Caracas	Futures	Hard	(Venezuela) Daniel Vallverdú	7–6^{(7–2)}, ret.
Win	3–0	May 2010	South Africa F2, Durban	Futures	Hard	(Switzerland) Adrien Bossel	6–3, 5–7, 6–2
Loss	3–1	Sep 2010	Canada F4, Toronto	Futures	Hard	(United States) Nicholas Monroe	3–6, 6–3, 4–6
Loss	3–2	May 2011	South Africa F1, Durban	Futures	Hard	(South Africa) Ruan Roelofse	4–6, 5–7
Loss	3–3	Feb 2012	Turkey F4, Antalya	Futures	Hard	(Bosnia and Herzegovina) Damir Džumhur	4–6, 6–7^{(4–7)}
Loss	3–4	Sep 2012	Turkey F35, Antalya	Futures	Hard	(Zimbabwe) Takanyi Garanganga	0–3 ret.
Win	4–4	Sep 2013	Austria F10, St. Pölten	Futures	Clay	(Germany) Kevin Krawietz	6–1, 4–6, 6–1

=== Doubles: 24 (15–9) ===
Legend ATP Challenger (3–1) ITF Futures (12–8)	Finals by surface Hard (13–5) Clay (2–3) Grass (0–0) Carpet (0–1)

Result	W–L	Date	Tournament	Tier	Surface	Partner	Opponents	Score
Loss	0–1	Feb 2009	Mexico F1, Tuxtla Gutiérrez	Futures	Hard	(Italy) Adriano Biasella	(Italy) Claudio Grassi (United States) Matthew Roberts	4–6, 5–7
Win	1–1	Jul 2009	Venezuela F4, Puerto Ordaz	Futures	Hard	(Venezuela) Luis David Martínez	(Argentina) Guillermo Durán (Argentina) Kevin Konfederak	6–1, 6–1
Win	2–1	Jul 2009	Venezuela F5, Caracas	Futures	Hard	(Venezuela) Luis David Martínez	(Venezuela) Juan de Armas (Venezuela) Daniel Vallverdú	walkover
Win	3–1	Aug 2009	Thailand F1, Nonthaburi	Futures	Hard	(Canada) Milos Raonic	(Japan) Satoshi Iwabuchi (Japan) Gouichi Motomura	0–6, 7–6^{(7–2)}, [10–3]
Win	4–1	Nov 2009	Dominican Republic F1, Santo Domingo	Futures	Hard	(United States) Adam El Mihdawy	(Croatia) Marin Draganja (Croatia) Dino Marcan	7–5, 6–4
Loss	4–2	Dec 2009	Dominican Republic F3, Santo Domingo	Futures	Hard	(Venezuela) Luis David Martínez	(Austria) Maximilian Neuchrist (Austria) Tristan-Samuel Weissborn	6–0, 6–7^{(4–7)}, [8–10]
Win	5–2	Mar 2010	Italy F1, Trento	Futures	Hard	(Belarus) Nikolai Fidirko	(Italy) Federico Gaio (Italy) Alessandro Giannessi	6–4, 6–4
Win	6–2	Apr 2010	Korea F3, Changwon	Futures	Hard	(Austria) Max Raditschnigg	(China) Gong Maoxin (China) Zhe Li	6–2, 2–6, [10–5]
Win	7–2	May 2010	South Africa F1, Durban	Futures	Hard	(Austria) Max Raditschnigg	(Russia) Sergei Krotiouk (Russia) Vitali Reshetnikov	7–5, 6–1
Loss	7–3	May 2010	South Africa F2, Durban	Futures	Hard	(Austria) Max Raditschnigg	(South Africa) Raven Klaasen (Austria) Richard Ruckelshausen	4–6, 7–5, [8–10]
Win	8–3	Jul 2010	Penza, Russia	Challenger	Hard	(Russia) Mikhail Elgin	(Belarus) Aliaksandr Bury (Belarus) Kiryl Harbatsiuk	6–4, 6–4
Win	9–3	Aug 2010	Astana, Kazakhstan	Challenger	Hard	(Russia) Mikhail Elgin	(China) Wu Di (China) Zhang Ze	6–0, 6–4
Win	10–3	May 2011	South Africa F2, Durban	Futures	Hard	(Austria) Richard Ruckelshausen	(Namibia) Jean Erasmus (United States) Edward Louies Oueilhe	6–2, 7–5
Win	11–3	Jul 2011	Italy F18, Modena	Futures	Clay	(Austria) Max Raditschnigg	(Italy) Federico Torresi (Italy) Stefano Travaglia	6–3, 6–4
Win	12–3	Sep 2011	Italy F27, Porto Torres	Futures	Hard	(Austria) Philipp Oswald	(Italy) Claudio Grassi (Italy) Erik Crepaldi	6–4, 6–1
Loss	12–4	Sep 2011	Croatia F9, Umag	Futures	Clay	(Austria) Max Raditschnigg	(Germany) Kevin Krawietz (Germany) Marcel Zimmermann	6–7^{(10–12)}, 2–6
Loss	12–5	Nov 2011	Chinese Taipei F3, Tainan	Futures	Clay	(Bulgaria) Aleksandar Lazov	(Chinese Taipei) Huang Liang-chi (Chinese Taipei) Yi Chu-Huan	3–6, 4–6
Win	13–5	Apr 2012	Turkey F14, Antalya	Futures	Hard	(Germany) Richard Becker	(Germany) Gero Kretschmer (United Kingdom) Alexander Slabinsky	6–4, 6–1
Win	14–5	Jul 2012	Penza, Russia	Challenger	Hard	(Russia) Konstantin Kravchuk	(India) Yuki Bhambri (India) Divij Sharan	6–7^{(5–7)}, 6–3, [10–7]
Loss	14–6	Aug 2012	Segovia, Spain	Challenger	Hard	(Russia) Konstantin Kravchuk	(Italy) Stefano Ianni (Romania) Florin Mergea	2–6, 3–6
Loss	14–7	Sep 2012	Turkey F35, Antalya	Futures	Hard	(Turkey) Tuna Altuna	(Russia) Kirill Dmitriev (Switzerland) Luca Margaroli	4–6, 0–6
Loss	14–8	Mar 2013	Croatia F5, Rovinj	Futures	Clay	(Austria) Tristan-Samuel Weissborn	(Bosnia and Herzegovina) Tomislav Brkić (Canada) Steven Diez	2–6, 2–6
Win	15–8	Sep 2013	Austria F9, Vogau	Futures	Clay	(Austria) Pascal Brunner	(Slovakia) Michal Pazicky (Slovakia) Adrian Sikora	6–3, 6–2
Loss	15–9	Oct 2013	Germany F17, Hambach	Futures	Carpet	(United Kingdom) Neil Pauffley	(Germany) Andreas Mies (Germany) Oscar Otte	5–7, 4–4 ret.

== Junior Grand Slam finals ==
=== Doubles: 1 (1 title) ===
Result	Year	Tournament	Surface	Partner	Opponents	Score
Win	2008	US Open	Hard	(Germany) Cedrik-Marcel Stebe	(Indonesia) Christopher Rungkat (Finland) Henri Kontinen	7–6^{(7–5)}, 3–6, [10–8]
