= Mikhail Ledovskikh =

Russian tennis player

- Country (sports): Russia
- Residence: Sochi, Russia
- Born: August 8, 1986 (age 38); Almaty, Kazakhstan
- Height: 1.88 m (6 ft 2 in)
- Plays: Right-handed (two-handed backhand)
- Prize money: $267,854

Singles
- Career record: 4–13
- Career titles: 0
- Highest ranking: No. 151 (14 April 2008)

Grand Slam singles results
- Australian Open: Q3 (2008)
- French Open: Q1 (2008)
- Wimbledon: Q1 (2008)
- US Open: Q1 (2008)

Doubles
- Career record: 0–0
- Career titles: 0
- Highest ranking: No. 787 (14 May 2007)
- Last updated on: 31 July 2022.

Mikhail Ledovskikh (born August 8, 1986) is a professional tennis player. He began playing tennis when he was seven. Currently residing in Sochi, Russia, he is coached by Alec Baranov.

== ATP Challenger and ITF Futures finals ==
=== Singles: 5 (1–4) ===
Legend ATP Challenger (1–2) ITF Futures (0–2)	Finals by surface Hard (1–4) Clay (0–0) Grass (0–0) Carpet (0–0)

Result	W–L	Date	Tournament	Tier	Surface	Opponent	Score
Win	1–0	Jun 2007	Astana, Kazakhstan	Challenger	Hard	(Germany) Bjorn Phau	7–6^{(7–2)}, 6–3
Loss	1–1	Jul 2007	Togliati, Russia	Challenger	Hard	(Israel) Dudi Sela	6–7^{(4–7)}, 3–6
Loss	1–2	Jul 2007	Penza, Russia	Challenger	Hard	(Germany) Benedikt Dorsch	5–7, 7–5, 1–6
Loss	1–3	Feb 2010	Azerbaijan F2, Baku	Futures	Hard	(Poland) Jerzy Janowicz	4–6, 6–7^{(6–8)}
Loss	1–4	Mar 2011	Russia F2, Tyumen	Futures	Hard	(Russia) Valery Rudnev	7–5, 2–6, 4–6
