= Andrey Kumantsov =

Former Russian tennis player

- Full name: Andrey Kumantsov
- Country (sports): Russia
- Born: 4 August 1986 (age 38)
- Plays: Right-handed
- Prize money: $103,856

Singles
- Career record: 0–2
- Highest ranking: No. 261 (13 September 2010)

Doubles
- Highest ranking: No. 237 (30 August 2010)

Andrey Kumantsov (born 4 August 1986) is a former professional tennis player from Russia.

== Biography ==
=== Career ===
Kumantsov, who won a total of 16 Futures titles, made the main draw of two ATP Tour tournaments, both times as a qualifier. At the 2011 Open 13 in Marseille he was beaten in the first round by Nicolas Mahut, then at the 2012 St. Petersburg Open he retired hurt in his opening round match against Jürgen Zopp, when only one game away from losing, citing dizziness.

=== Life ban ===
In 2014 he received a life ban from tennis following an investigation by the Tennis Integrity Unit. He was found guilty of 12 charges under the tennis anti-corruption code, for a series of incidents between 2010 and 2013, all relating to betting and match fixing. The ban means that Kumantsov is not eligible to participate in or attend any events that are organised or sanctioned by the governing bodies of professional tennis.
