= Victor Baluda =

Russian tennis player

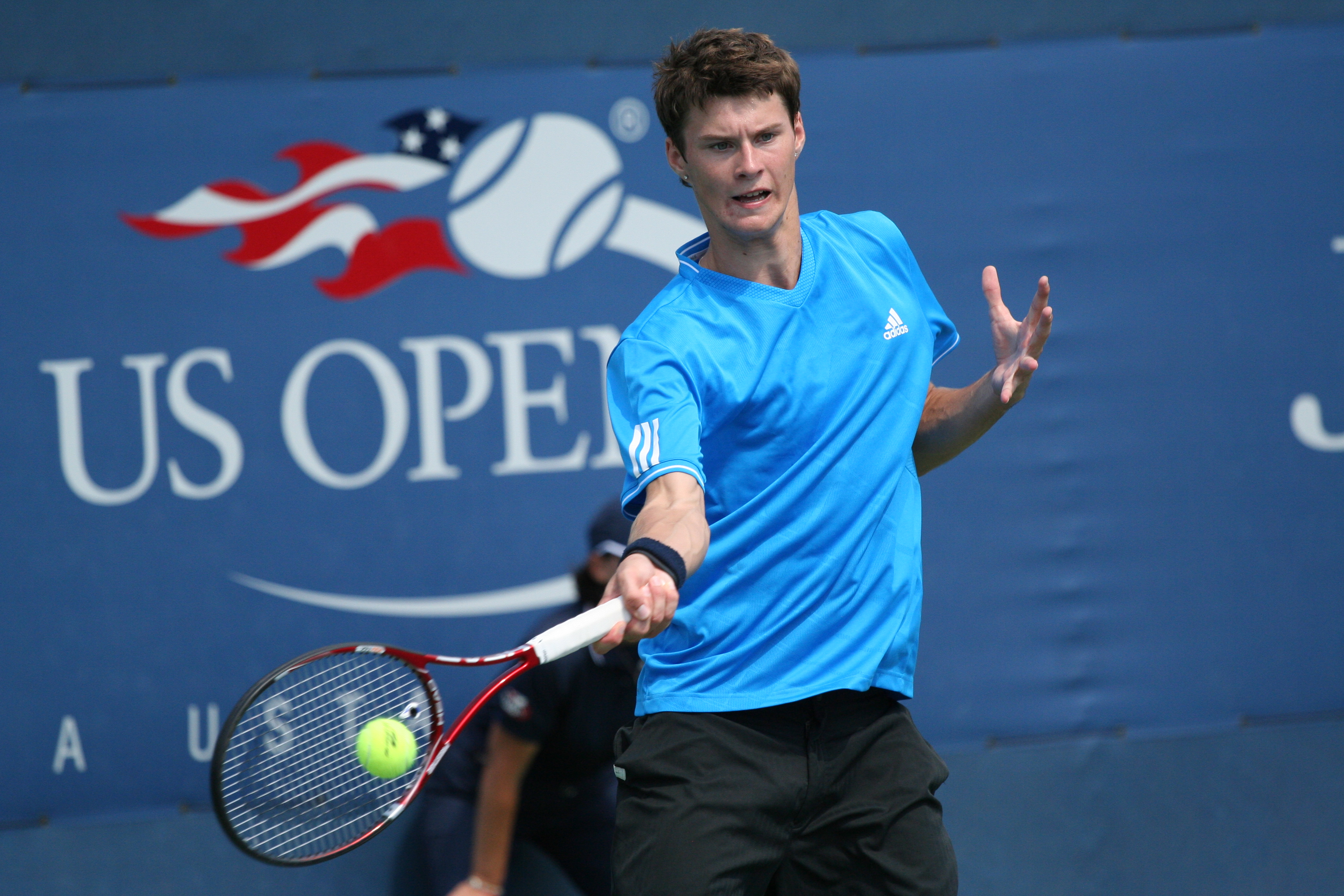
- Country (sports): Russia
- Born: 30 September 1992 (age 33) Moscow, Russia
- Plays: Right-handed (two-handed backhand)
- Prize money: $115,565

Singles
- Career record: 0–1
- Career titles: 0
- Highest ranking: No. 290 (23 September 2013)

Doubles
- Career record: 3–5
- Career titles: 0
- Highest ranking: No. 115 (4 August 2014)

Victor Mikhaylovich Baluda (Russian: Виктор Михайлович Балуда; born 30 September 1992) is a Russian tennis player playing on the ATP Challenger Tour. In September 2013, he reached his highest ATP singles ranking of World No. 290 and achieved his highest doubles ranking of No. 115 in August 2014.

== Future and Challenger finals ==
=== Singles: 12 (6–6) ===
Legend
Challengers (0–0)
Futures (6–6)

Outcome	No.	Date	Tournament	Surface	Opponent	Score
Runner-up	1.	3 July 2011	Middelburg, Netherlands	Clay	(Belgium) Yannick Mertens	4–6, 4–6
Winner	2.	11 November 2011	Tainan, Chinese Taipei	Clay	(Spain) Dario Perez	6–3, 6–3
Winner	3.	20 November 2011	Tainan, Chinese Taipei	Clay	(Chinese Taipei) Ti Chen	6–3, 6–3
Winner	4.	8 December 2012	Hong Kong, China	Hard	(Australia) Alex Bolt	6–4, 6–2
Runner-up	5.	15 December 2012	Hong Kong, China	Hard	(Australia) Alex Bolt	3–6, 5–7
Runner-up	6.	1 June 2013	Moscow, Russia	Clay	(Russia) Aslan Karatsev	6–4, 2–6, 2–6
Runner-up	7.	3 August 2013	Balashikha, Russia	Clay	(Russia) Valery Rudnev	3–6, 3–6
Winner	8.	16 August 2014	Kazan, Russia	Hard	(Israel) Tal Goldengoren	6–2, 6–1
Winner	9.	16 August 2014	Moscow, Russia	Clay	(Russia) Philip Davydenko	6–3, 6–4
Runner-up	10.	24 October 2014	Minsk, Belarus	Hard (i)	(Russia) Evgeny Tyurnev	6–2, 5–7, 6–7^{(4–7)}
Runner-up	11.	30 May 2015	Pantiani, Georgia	Clay	(Poland) Grzegorz Panfil	1–6, 6–7^{(0–7)}
Winner	12.	7 February 2016	Baku, Azerbaijan	Carpet (i)	(Czech Republic) Michail Konecny	7–5, 7–6^{(7–2)}

=== Doubles 18 (9–9) ===
Legend
Challengers 5 (3–2)
Futures 13 (6–7)

Outcome	No.	Date	Tournament	Surface	Partner	Opponents	Score
Runner-up	1.	5 March 2011	Cherkasy, Ukraine	Hard (i)	(Russia) Alexander Rumyantsev	(Czech Republic) Mihail Konecny (Czech Republic) Mihal Schmid	6–4, 4–6, [11–13]
Winner	2.	4 August 2011	Moscow, Russia	Clay	(Russia) Alexander Rumyantsev	(Russia) Mikhail Fufygin (Russia) Sergei Krotiouk	6–4, 6–2
Runner-up	3.	4 November 2011	Phuket, Thailand	Hard (i)	(Chinese Taipei) Jimmy Wang	(Thailand) Sanchai Ratiwatana (Thailand) Sonchat Ratiwatana	6–4, 6–2
Winner	4.	6 September 2012	Wierden, Netherlands	Clay	(Netherlands) Yannick Ebbinghaus	(Netherlands) Sander Arends (Netherlands) Elroy Middendorp	6–3, 6–2
Winner	5.	26 October 2012	Astana, Kazakhstan	Hard (i)	(Russia) Sergei Krotiouk	(Belgium) Julien Cagnina (Russia) Mikhail Vaks	6–7,^{(7–9)}, 6–4, [10–7]
Runner-up	6.	7 December 2012	Hong Kong, China	Hard	(Russia) Evgeny Karlovskiy	(United States) Jason Jung (United States) Ryan Thacher	1–6, 1–6
Runner-up	7.	22 February 2013	Aktobe, Kazakhstan	Hard (i)	(Croatia) Mate Pavic	(Russia) Alexander Kudryavtsev (Kazakhstan) Yuriy Schukin	6–7,^{(6–8)}, 2–6
Winner	8.	1 March 2013	Aktobe, Kazakhstan	Hard (i)	(Croatia) Mate Pavic	(China) Mao-Xin Gong (China) Ze Zhang	6–2, 6–3
Winner	9.	5 March 2013	An-Ning, China	Clay	(Croatia) Dino Marcan	(Australia) Samuel Groth (Australia) John-Patrick Smith	6–7 ^{(5–7)}, 6–4, [10–7]
Runner-up	10.	2 August 2013	Balashikha, Russia	Clay	(Russia) Alexander Rumyantsev	(Russia) Alexandre Krasnoroutskiy (Russia) Anton Manegin	3–6, 4–6
Winner	11.	18 August 2013	Kazan, Russia	Hard	(Russia) Konstantin Kravchuk	(Slovakia) Ivo Klec (Estonia) Jürgen Zopp	6–3, 6–4
Runner-up	12.	16 March 2014	Kazan, Russia	Hard (i)	(Russia) Konstantin Kravchuk	(Italy) Flavio Cipolla (Serbia) Goran Tosic	6–3, 5–7, [10–12]
Runner-up	13.	6 April 2014	Saint Brieuc, France	Hard (i)	(Germany) Philipp Marx	(Germany) Dominik Meffert (Germany) Tim Pütz	4–6, 3–6
Runner-up	14.	18 April 2014	Chengdu, China	Hard	(Belarus) Ilya Ivashka	(China) Mao-Xin Gong (China) Zhe Li	1–0, ret.
Winner	15.	3 August 2014	Segovia, Spain	Hard	(Russia) Alexander Kudryavtsev	(United Kingdom) Brydan Klein (Croatia) Nikola Mektic	6–2, 4–6, [10–3]
Winner	16.	15 August 2014	Kazan, Russia	Hard	(Russia) Evgeny Karlovskiy	(Russia) Andrey Saveliev (Russia) Mikhail Vaks	7–6,^{(8–6)}, 6–3
Runner-up	17.	30 May 2015	Pantiani, Georgia	Clay	(Russia) Ivan Kalinin	(Italy) Marco Bortolotti (Brazil) Thiago Monteiro	6–7,^{(7–9)}, 5–7
Winner	18.	6 June 2015	Pantiani, Georgia	Clay	(Russia) Ivan Kalinin	(Georgia (country)) Giorgi Javakhisvili (Georgia (country)) Aleksandre Metreveli	7–5, 6–1
