= Alexander Kudryavtsev =

Russian tennis player

Alexander Kudryavtsev Александр Кудрявцев
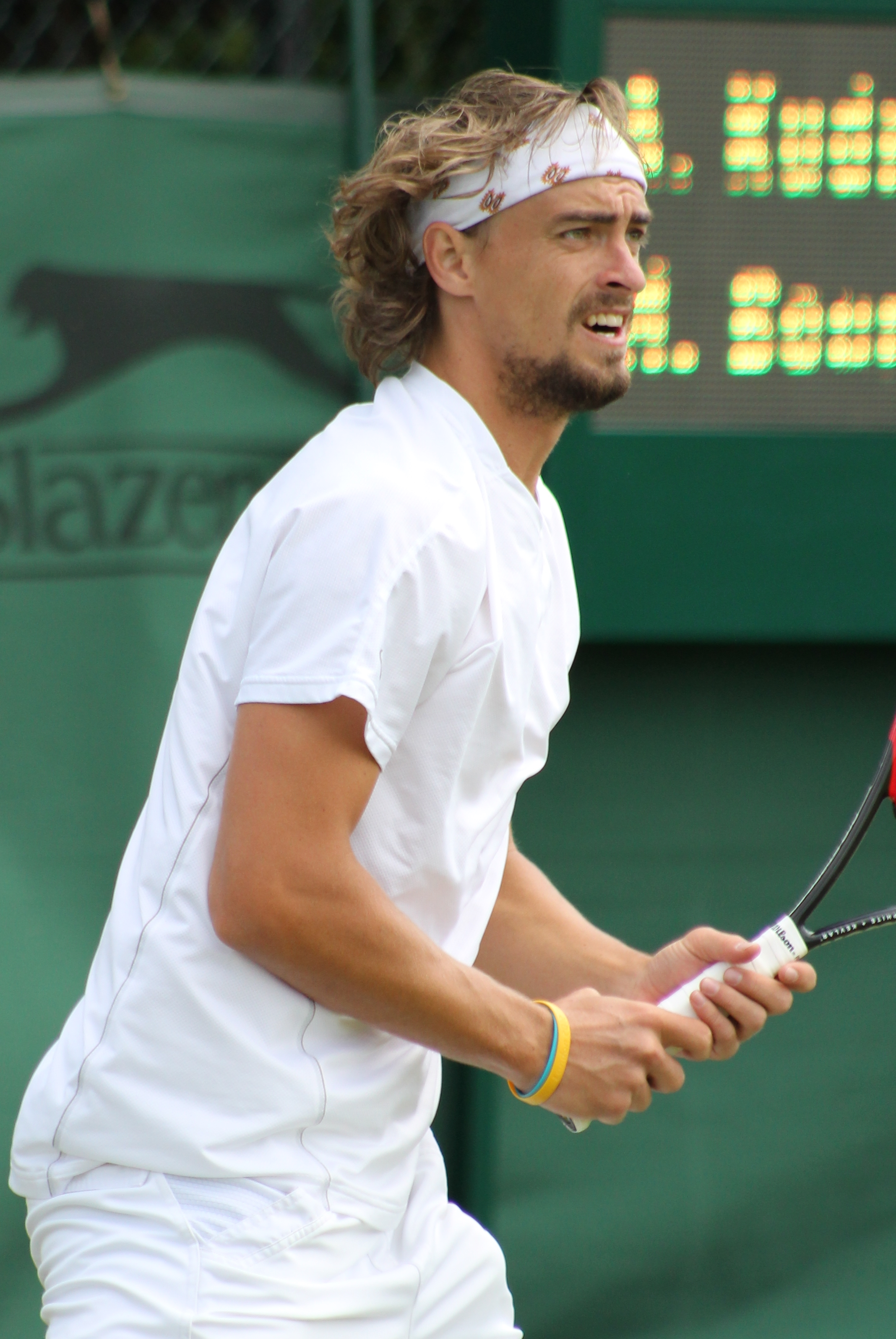
- Kudryavtsev at 2015 Wimbledon Qualifying
- Country (sports): Russia
- Born: 26 October 1985 (age 39) Ekaterinburg, USSR
- Height: 1.83 m (6 ft 0 in)
- Turned pro: 2003
- Retired: 2017
- Plays: Right-handed (two-handed backhand)
- Coach: Vadim Davletshin
- Prize money: $ 909,894

Singles
- Career record: 5–15
- Career titles: 0
- Highest ranking: No. 117 (2 February 2015)

Grand Slam singles results
- Australian Open: 1R (2012, 2015)
- French Open: Q2 (2015)
- Wimbledon: 1R (2016)
- US Open: 2R (2014)

Doubles
- Career record: 9–11
- Career titles: 0
- Highest ranking: No. 70 (7 November 2011)

Grand Slam doubles results
- Australian Open: 2R (2012)
- Wimbledon: 1R (2008)
- Last updated on: 23 November 2017.

Alexander Mikhailovich Kudryavtsev (Russian: Алекса́ндр Миха́йлович Кудря́вцев; born 26 October 1985) is a retired Russian professional tennis player who has played professionally since 2003. He made his breakthrough in 2008, playing in his first top-level international tournaments on the ATP tour, having spent time playing at the ATP Challenger Tour and Futures events. He reached his career-high singles ranking of 117 on 2 February 2015 and career-high doubles ranking of 70 on 7 November 2011.

== Professional career ==
=== Early career ===
Kudryavtsev reached the quarter-finals in a futures event in Bucharest in 2003. In 2004 he advanced to the second round in three futures events, and won a doubles challenger title. In 2005 he was a semi-finalist in a Beijing futures tournament, and reached the quarterfinals in Korolev (Russia) and Minsk (Belarus). In 2006 he became a finalist for the first time in Uzbekistan, as well as reaching the semi-finals once and the quarter-finals twice in other events.

In 2007 he started by winning his first Futures title in India and followed it up by winning a second in Belarus in May. In the second half of the season he was a quarter- or semi-finalist in six Challenger events with a 15–11 win–loss record. He also reached 9 finals (5 wins with three different partners) in doubles competitions and finished the year ranked No. 96 in doubles.

=== 2008 ===
Kudryavtsev began the year positively by reaching the second round of his maiden top-level tournament. After coming through qualifying he beat Prakash Amritraj of India. In the second round he faced former World No. 1 Carlos Moyá and lost in a hard-fought game 3–6, 7–6^{(4)}, 2–6. His next international event was at Estoril in Portugal in April where he lost in the first round to France's Thierry Ascione (ranked #82).

He competed in his first Masters Series event at Toronto in Canada in July. In the first round he upset No. 33 ranked Philipp Kohlschreiber of Germany 6–2, 7–6^{(7)} but he could not repeat this in the second round as he lost to Frenchman Richard Gasquet (ranked #12).

=== 2012 ===
Kudryavtsev began the year by qualifying for the Australian Open main draw. He met No. 3 seed Roger Federer in the opening round and lost in three sets.

== Singles performance timeline ==
Key
W	F	SF	QF	#R	RR	Q#	DNQ	A	NH

(W) winner; (F) finalist; (SF) semifinalist; (QF) quarterfinalist; (#R) rounds 4, 3, 2, 1; (RR) round-robin stage; (Q#) qualification round; (DNQ) did not qualify; (A) absent; (NH) not held; (SR) strike rate (events won / competed); (W–L) win–loss record.

This table is current through the 2016 US Open.

Tournament	2008	2009	2010	2011	2012	2013	2014	2015	2016	SR	W–L
Australian Open	Q3	Q3	A	Q1	1R	A	Q1	1R	Q3	0 / 2	0–2
French Open	A	A	A	Q1	A	A	A	Q2	Q1	0 / 0	0–0
Wimbledon	Q3	Q2	Q2	Q2	Q1	A	A	Q1	1R	0 / 1	0–1
US Open	Q2	Q1	Q2	A	A	A	2R	Q2	Q1	0 / 1	1–1
Win–loss	0–0	0–0	0–0	0–0	0–1	0–0	1–1	0–1	0–1	0 / 4	1–4
Year End Ranking	208	205	159	158	275	268	119	164	193		

== Personal life ==
Kudryavtsev began playing tennis at the age of six while living in Saint Petersburg in Russia. He admired tennis players Andre Agassi and countryman Marat Safin while growing up and strove to be as good as them. As a professional he enjoys playing on most surfaces except grass and does not have a favorite shot. He's coached by Vadim Davletshin. He married his wife Rushana on 16 March 2007 and they had a son named Egor (born 6 August 2007)

== Career finals ==
=== ATP career finals ===
==== Doubles: 1 (1 runner-up) ====
Legend Grand Slam (0–0) Tennis Masters Cup (0–0) ATP Tour Masters 1000 (0–0) ATP Tour 500 series (0–0) ATP Tour 250 series (0–1)	Titles by surface Hard (0–1) Clay (0–0) Grass (0–0) Carpet (0–0)

Outcome	No.	Date	Tournament	Surface	Partner	Opponents	Score
Runner-up	1.	30 October 2011	St. Petersburg, Russia	Hard (i)	(Russia) Mikhail Elgin	(United Kingdom) Colin Fleming (United Kingdom) Ross Hutchins	3–6, 7–6^{(7–5)}, [8–10]

== Challengers and Futures finals ==
=== Singles: 17 (6 titles, 11 runners-up) ===
Legend
Challengers (0–10)
Futures (6–1)

Result	No.	Date	Tournament	Surface	Opponent	Score
Loss	1.	22 April 2006	Guliston, Uzbekistan	Hard	(Romania) Teodor-Dacian Crăciun	0–6, 6–4, 6–7^{(5–7)}
Win	2.	3 February 2007	Delhi, India	Hard	(Bulgaria) Todor Enev	6–4, 6–2
Win	3.	19 May 2007	Minsk, Belarus	Hard	(Croatia) Ivan Cerović	6–2, 6–4
Loss	4.	8 February 2009	Wrocław, Poland	Hard (i)	(Germany) Michael Berrer	3–6, 4–6
Win	5.	20 March 2010	Astana, Kazakhstan	Hard (i)	(Russia) Evgeny Donskoy	6–4, 6–3
Win	6.	1 May 2010	Namangan, Uzbekistan	Hard	(Ukraine) Denys Molchanov	6–4, 6–4
Loss	7.	25 September 2010	Bangkok, Thailand	Hard	(Bulgaria) Grigor Dimitrov	4–6, 1–6
Loss	8.	19 March 2011	Guangzhou, China	Hard	(Belarus) Uladzimir Ignatik	4–6, 4–6
Loss	9.	11 September 2011	Shanghai, China	Hard	(Germany) Cedrik-Marcel Stebe	4–6, 6–4, 5–7
Loss	10.	19 February 2012	Bergamo, Italy	Hard (i)	(Germany) Björn Phau	4–6, 4–6
Win	11.	15 June 2013	Herzliya, Israel	Hard	(France) Albano Olivetti	5–7, 6–4, 6–4
Win	12.	22 June 2013	Herzliya, Israel	Hard	(United Kingdom) Ashley Hewitt	6–3, 6–4, 6–3
Loss	13.	8 February 2014	Chennai, India	Hard	(India) Yuki Bhambri	6–4, 3–6, 5–7
Loss	14.	15 June 2014	Fergana, Uzbekistan	Hard	(Slovenia) Blaž Kavčič	4–6, 6–7^{(8–10)}
Loss	15.	22 June 2014	Tianjin, China	Hard	(Slovenia) Blaž Kavčič	2–6, 6–3, 5–7
Loss	16.	21 June 2015	Fergana, Uzbekistan	Hard	(Russia) Teymuraz Gabashvili	2–6, 0–1 ret.
Loss	17.	29 November 2015	Toyota, Japan	Carpet (i)	(Japan) Yoshihito Nishioka	3–6, 4–6

=== Doubles: 55 (33 titles, 22 runners-up) ===
Legend
ATP Challengers (21–15)
ITF Futures (12–7)

Result	No.	Date	Tournament	Surface	Partner	Opponent	Score
Win	1.	9 July 2004	Oberstaufen, Germany	Clay	(Russia) Vadim Davletshin	(Germany) Valentino Pest (Germany) Alexander Waske	4–6, 6–3, 7–6
Loss	2.	5 August 2005	Saransk, Russia	Clay	(Russia) Konstantin Kravchuk	(Germany) Simon Stadler (Italy) Flavio Cipolla	6–7^{(2–7)}, 6–4, 6–7^{(3–7)}
Loss	3.	13 August 2005	Sergiyev Posad, Russia	Clay	(Kazakhstan) Alexey Kedryuk	(Russia) Mikhail Elgin (Ukraine) Mikhail Filima	2–6, 4–6
Loss	4.	22 April 2006	Guliston, Uzbekistan	Hard	(Russia) Konstantin Kravchuk	(Russia) Mikhail Elgin (Kazakhstan) Alexey Kedryuk	7–5, 4–6, 4–6
Win	5.	27 May 2006	Kyiv, Ukraine	Clay	(Russia) Alexandre Krasnoroutskiy	(Russia) Andrei Stoliarov (Ukraine) Aleksandr Yarmola	6–3, 3–6, 6–2
Win	6.	4 June 2006	Cherkasy, Ukraine	Clay	(Russia) Alexandre Krasnoroutskiy	(Ukraine) Sergei Bubka (Ukraine) Aleksandr Nedovesov	6–3, 4–6, 6–2
Win	7.	25 June 2006	Minsk, Belarus	Hard	(Russia) Alexandre Krasnoroutskiy	(Belarus) Alexander Bury (Belarus) Kyril Harbatsiuk	7–5, 6–3
Loss	8.	20 August 2006	Wrocław, Poland	Clay	(Russia) Alexandre Krasnoroutskiy	(Czech Republic) David Novak (Czech Republic) Martin Vacek	6–4, 5–7, 2–6
Win	9.	27 August 2006	Poznań, Poland	Clay	(Russia) Alexandre Krasnoroutskiy	(Poland) Tomasz Bednarek (Poland) Maciej Diłaj	2–6, 7–5, 6–1
Loss	10.	19 November 2006	Sergiyev Posad, Russia	Hard (i)	(Russia) Alexandre Krasnoroutskiy	(Germany) David Klier (Slovakia) Filip Polášek	6–7^{(6–8)}, 6–7^{(5–7)}
Win	11.	26 November 2006	Mosrentgen, Russia	Hard (i)	(Russia) Alexandre Krasnoroutskiy	(Uzbekistan) Sarvar Ikramov (Russia) Alexey Tikhonov	6–1, 6–1
Win	12.	2 February 2007	New Delhi, India	Hard	(Kazakhstan) Alexey Kedryuk	(India) Sandeep Kirtane (India) Purav Raja	6–4, 6–2
Loss	13.	23 February 2007	Brownsville, Texas, United States	Hard	(Romania) Horia Tecău	(United States) Nicholas Monroe (South Africa) Izak van der Merwe	5–7, 6–7^{(5–7)}
Loss	14.	4 May 2007	Ostrava, Czech Republic	Clay	(Russia) Alexandre Krasnoroutskiy	(Germany) Bastian Knittel (Czech Republic) Lukáš Rosol	6–2, 5–7, [9–11]
Win	15.	25 May 2007	Minsk, Belarus	Hard	(Russia) Alexandre Krasnoroutskiy	(France) Olivier Charroin (Canada) Pierre-Ludovic Duclos	2–6, 6–3, 6–2
Loss	16.	22 June 2007	Almaty, Kazakhstan	Clay	(Kazakhstan) Alexey Kedryuk	(Slovakia) Kamil Čapkovič (Bosnia and Herzegovina) Ivan Dodig	4–6, 6–3, [7–10]
Loss	17.	29 June 2007	Almaty, Kazakhstan	Clay	(Kazakhstan) Alexey Kedryuk	(Romania) Teodor-Dacian Crăciun (Romania) Florin Mergea	2–6, 1–6
Win	18.	27 July 2007	Penza, Russia	Hard	(Russia) Alexandre Krasnoroutskiy	(Uzbekistan) Murad Inoyatov (Uzbekistan) Denis Istomin	6–1, 4–6, [10–4]
Win	19.	17 August 2007	Bukhara, Uzbekistan	Hard	(Russia) Evgeny Kirillov	(Russia) Danila Arsenov (Uzbekistan) Vaja Uzakov	6–3, 6–1
Loss	20.	31 August 2007	Cherkasy, Ukraine	Clay	(Ukraine) Sergei Bubka	(Spain) Daniel Muñoz de la Nava (Spain) Santiago Ventura	2–6, 6–7^{(4–7)}
Win	21.	15 September 2007	Ljubljana, Slovenia	Clay	(Russia) Alexandre Krasnoroutskiy	(Bosnia and Herzegovina) Ivan Dodig (Croatia) Lovro Zovko	7–6^{(11–9)}, 1–6, [10–6]
Win	22.	22 September 2007	Banja Luka, Bosnia & Herzegovina	Clay	(Russia) Alexandre Krasnoroutskiy	(Argentina) Diego Junqueira (Serbia) Vladimir Obradović	6–2, 6–4
Win	23.	16 November 2007	Helsinki, Finland	Hard (i)	(Russia) Mikhail Elgin	(Finland) Harri Heliövaara (Finland) Henri Kontinen	4–6, 7–5, [13–11]
Loss	24.	17 October 2008	Tashkent, Uzbekistan	Hard	(Russia) Mikhail Elgin	(Italy) Flavio Cipolla (Czech Republic) Pavel Šnobel	3–6, 4–6
Win	25.	7 November 2008	Astana, Kazakhstan	Hard (i)	(Russia) Mikhail Elgin	(Switzerland) George Bastl (Switzerland) Marco Chiudinelli	6–4, 6–7^{(8–10)}, [10–8]
Loss	26.	1 March 2009	Wolfsburg, Germany	Carpet (i)	(Ukraine) Sergei Bubka	(United States) Travis Rettenmaier (United Kingdom) Ken Skupski	3–6, 4–6
Loss	27.	20 March 2009	Bangkok, Thailand	Hard	(Russia) Mikhail Elgin	(United Kingdom) Josh Goodall (Australia) Joseph Sirianni	3–6, 1–6
Loss	28.	19 April 2009	Johannesburg, South Africa	Hard	(Russia) Mikhail Elgin	(Switzerland) George Bastl (Australia) Chris Guccione	2–6, 6–4, [9–11]
Win	29.	24 July 2009	Penza, Russia	Hard	(Russia) Mikhail Elgin	(Kazakhstan) Alexey Kedryuk (Russia) Denis Matsukevitch	4–6, 6–3, [10–6]
Loss	30.	18 September 2009	Mulhouse, France	Hard (i)	(Russia) Konstantin Kravchuk	(Belgium) Ruben Bemelmans (Belgium) Yannick Mertens	3–6, 6–7^{(6–8)}
Win	31.	28 November 2009	Toyota, Japan	Carpet (i)	(Latvia) Andis Juška	(Kazakhstan) Alexey Kedryuk (Japan) Junn Mitsuhashi	6–4, 7–6^{(8–6)}
Win	32.	19 March 2010	Astana, Kazakhstan	Hard (i)	(Russia) Evgeny Kirillov	(Austria) Alexander Peya (United Kingdom) Alexander Slabinsky	6–3, 6–4
Win	33.	26 March 2010	Almaty, Kazakhstan	Hard (i)	(Russia) Evgeny Kirillov	(Kazakhstan) Alexey Kedryuk (Ukraine) Denys Molchanov	7–5, 6–4
Win	34.	23 April 2010	Andijan, Uzbekistan	Hard	(Ukraine) Denys Molchanov	(Russia) Mikhail Elgin (Kazakhstan) Alexey Kedryuk	6–2, 6–1
Win	35.	2 July 2010	Palma del Río, Spain	Hard	(Russia) Evgeny Kirillov	(Spain) Marc Fornell Mestres (Spain) Pablo Martin Adalia	6–4, 6–2
Loss	36.	6 November 2010	Astana, Kazakhstan	Hard (i)	(Russia) Mikhail Elgin	(United Kingdom) Colin Fleming (United Kingdom) Ross Hutchins	3–6, 6–7^{(10–12)}
Win	37.	13 November 2010	Ortisei, Italy	Carpet (i)	(Russia) Mikhail Elgin	(Poland) Tomasz Bednarek (Poland) Michał Przysiężny	3–6, 6–3, [10–3]
Loss	38.	5 February 2011	Kazan, Russia	Hard (i)	(Russia) Mikhail Elgin	(Switzerland) Yves Allegro (Germany) Andreas Beck	4–6, 4–6
Loss	39.	12 February 2011	Bergamo, Italy	Hard (i)	(Russia) Mikhail Elgin	(Denmark) Frederik Nielsen (United Kingdom) Ken Skupski	w/o
Win	40.	19 March 2011	Guangzhou, China	Hard	(Russia) Mikhail Elgin	(Thailand) Sanchai Ratiwatana (Thailand) Sonchat Ratiwatana	7–6^{(7–3)}, 6–3
Win	41.	26 March 2011	Pingguo, China	Hard	(Russia) Mikhail Elgin	(Finland) Harri Heliövaara (New Zealand) Jose Statham	6–3, 6–2
Loss	42.	30 April 2011	Ostrava, Czech Republic	Clay	(Latvia) Andis Juška	(France) Olivier Charroin (France) Stéphane Robert	4–6, 3–6
Win	43.	12 August 2011	Samarkand, Uzbekistan	Clay	(Russia) Mikhail Elgin	(Moldova) Radu Albot (Russia) Andrey Kuznetsov	7–6^{(7–4)}, 2–6, [10–7]
Win	44.	19 August 2011	Qarshi, Uzbekistan	Hard	(Russia) Mikhail Elgin	(Russia) Konstantin Kravchuk (Ukraine) Denys Molchanov	3–6, 6–3, [11–9]
Win	45.	6 November 2011	Eckental, Germany	Carpet (i)	(Germany) Andre Begemann	(United States) James Cerretani (Canada) Adil Shamasdin	6–3, 3–6, [11–9]
Win	46.	21 February 2013	Aktobe, Kazakhstan	Hard (i)	(Kazakhstan) Yuri Schukin	(Russia) Victor Baluda (Croatia) Mate Pavić	7–6^{(8–6)}, 6–2
Loss	47.	29 March 2013	Novokuznetsk, Russia	Hard (i)	(Russia) Mikhail Elgin	(Belarus) Sergey Betov (Russia) Mikhail Biryukov	1–6, 6–7^{(3–7)}
Win	48.	1 August 2014	Segovia, Spain	Hard	(Russia) Victor Baluda	(United Kingdom) Brydan Klein (Croatia) Nikola Mektić	6–2, 4–6, [10–3]
Loss	49.	15 September 2014	İzmir, Turkey	Hard	(Tunisia) Malek Jaziri	(United Kingdom) Ken Skupski (United Kingdom) Neal Skupski	1–6, 4–6
Win	50.	22 February 2015	New Delhi, India	Hard	(Belarus) Egor Gerasimov	(Italy) Riccardo Ghedin (Japan) Toshihide Matsui	6–7^{(5–7)}, 6–4, [10–6]
Win	51.	8 August 2015	Segovia, Spain	Hard	(Ukraine) Denys Molchanov	(Belarus) Alexander Bury (Sweden) Andreas Siljeström	6–2, 6–4
Win	52.	20 March 2016	Guangzhou, China	Hard	(Ukraine) Denys Molchanov	(Thailand) Sanchai Ratiwatana (Thailand) Sonchat Ratiwatana	6–2, 6–2
Loss	53.	30 July 2016	Astana, Kazakhstan	Hard	(Russia) Mikhail Elgin	(Belarus) Yaraslav Shyla (Belarus) Andrei Vasilevski	4–6, 4–6
Win	54.	29 October 2016	Suzhou, China	Hard	(Russia) Mikhail Elgin	(Italy) Andrea Arnaboldi (France) Jonathan Eysseric	4–6, 6–1, [10–7]
Win	55.	19 November 2016	Brescia, Italy	Carpet (i)	(Russia) Mikhail Elgin	(Netherlands) Wesley Koolhof (Netherlands) Matwé Middelkoop	7–6^{(7–4)}, 6–3
