= Anton Manegin =

Russian tennis player

- Full name: Anton Konstantinovich Manegin
- Country (sports): Russia
- Born: 12 March 1990 (age 35)
- Plays: Right-handed
- Prize money: $36,695

Singles
- Highest ranking: No. 825 (13 Sep 2010)

Doubles
- Career record: 0–1
- Highest ranking: No. 472 (9 Dec 2013)

Anton Konstantinovich Manegin (born 12 March 1990) is a Russian former professional tennis player.

Manegin made his only ATP Tour main draw appearance at the 2009 Kremlin Cup, as a wildcard pairing with Teymuraz Gabashvili in the doubles event. In 2011 he represented Russia at the Summer Universiade in Shenzhen, China. During his career he won five doubles titles on the ITF Futures circuit.

His family runs the Timokhovo Landfill, east of Moscow, which is considered one of the largest in Europe.

== ITF Futures titles ==
=== Doubles: (5) ===
No.	Date	Tournament	Surface	Partner	Opponents	Score
1.	Dec 2012	Turkey F50, Istanbul	Hard	(Russia) Alexandre Krasnoroutskiy	(Bulgaria) Tihomir Grozdanov (Bulgaria) Dinko Halachev	7–6^{(2)}, 6–3
2.	May 2013	Russia F5, Vsevolozhsk	Carpet	(Russia) Alexandre Krasnoroutskiy	(Russia) Vladimir Polyakov (Russia) Mikhail Vaks	2–6, 6–3, [10–7]
3.	Aug 2013	Russia F9, Balashikha	Clay	(Russia) Alexandre Krasnoroutskiy	(Russia) Victor Baluda (Russia) Alexander Rumyantsev	6–3, 6–4
4.	Aug 2013	Russia F11, Moscow	Clay	(Russia) Alexandre Krasnoroutskiy	(Russia) Andrey Saveliev (Russia) Mikhail Vaks	6–2, 1–6, [10–5]
5.	Jun 2014	Kazakhstan F7, Astana	Hard	(Russia) Alexander Vasilenko	(Russia) Evgeny Elistratov (Russia) Vladimir Polyakov	6–4, 4–6, [10–5]
