= Sergei Bubka (tennis) =

Ukrainian professional tennis player

Sergei Bubka Сергей Бубка
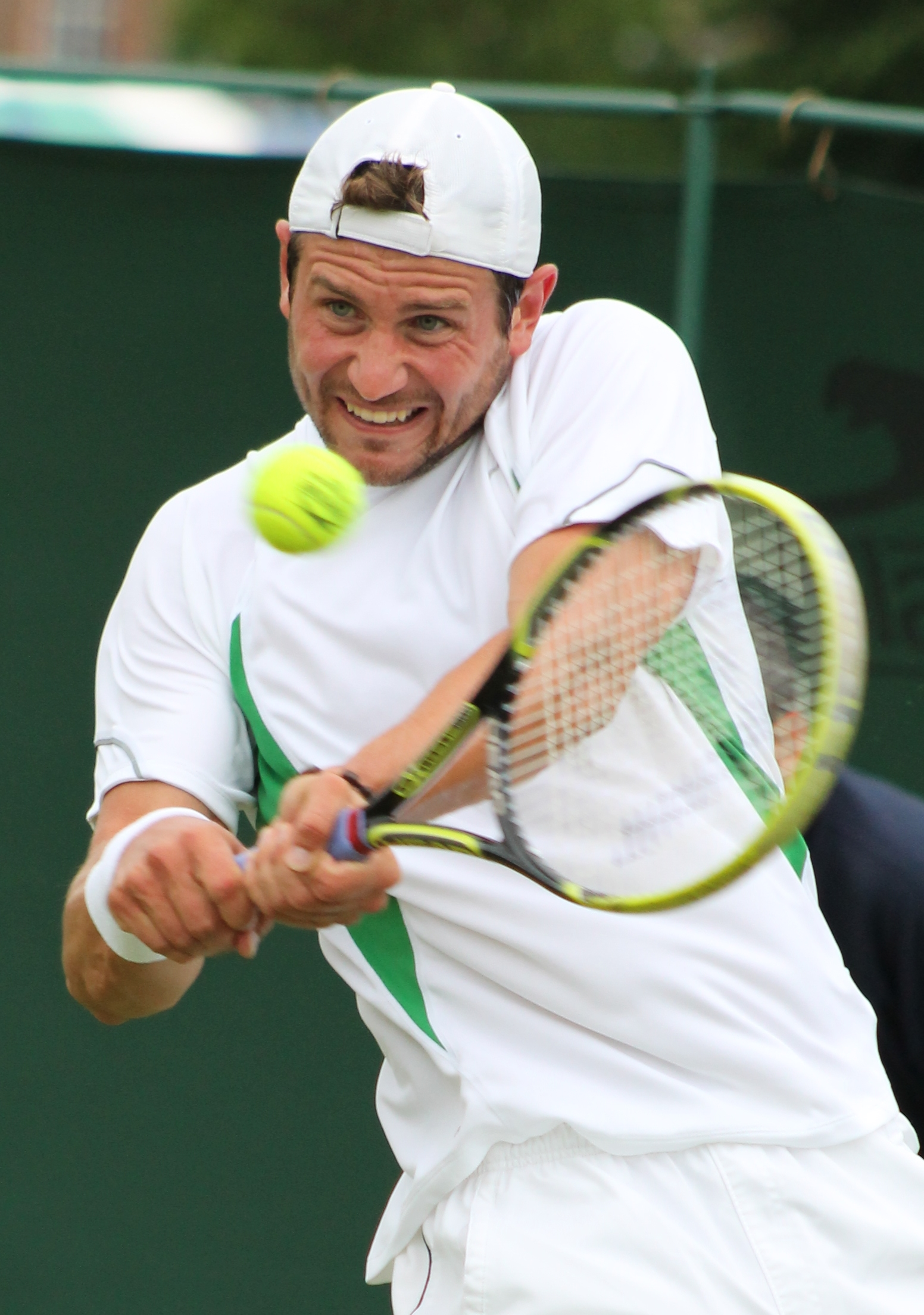
- Country (sports): Ukraine
- Residence: Monte Carlo, Monaco
- Born: 10 February 1987 (age 39) Donetsk, Ukraine, USSR
- Height: 1.88 m (6 ft 2 in)
- Turned pro: 2005
- Retired: 2016
- Plays: Right-handed
- Coach: Tibor Toth
- Prize money: US$ 465,186

Singles
- Career record: 15–16
- Career titles: 0
- Highest ranking: No. 145 (November 14, 2011)

Grand Slam singles results
- Australian Open: Q3 (2012)
- French Open: Q1 (2012, 2014)
- Wimbledon: Q2 (2012)
- US Open: 2R (2011)

Doubles
- Career record: 7–12
- Career titles: 0
- Highest ranking: No. 134 (May 26, 2008)

Sergei Sergeevich Bubka (Ukrainian: Сергій Сергійович Бубка, romanized: Serhiy Serhiyovych Bubka; born 10 February 1987) is a Ukrainian former professional tennis player.

== Biography ==
Bubka is the son of pole vaulter Sergey Bubka. The younger Bubka was a member of the Ukraine Davis Cup team and was coached by Tibor Toth, who is also the former coach of Sergiy Stakhovsky.

Sergei's biggest success in his career was beating the 5th-seeded Ivan Ljubičić in the first round of the 2011 Dubai Tennis Championships. He also hit a 157 MPH serve during qualifying for the 2011 US Open, which would have tied for the fastest ever recorded had the serve not been out.

On 1 November 2012, Sergei Bubka was seriously injured in a fall from the third floor of an apartment building in Paris. He returned to play tennis in February 2014. He retired in 2016.

== ATP Challenger and ITF Futures titles ==
=== Singles: 2 ===
Legend
ATP Challenger (1)
ITF Futures (1)

No.	Date	Tournament	Tier	Surface	Opponent	Score
1.	Mar 2009	Kyoto, Japan	Challenger	Carpet	(Japan) Takao Suzuki	7–6^{(8–6)}, 6–4
2.	Jan 2010	Germany F3, Kaarst	Futures	Carpet	(Netherlands) Jesse Huta Galung	6–1, 6–4

=== Doubles: 7 ===
Legend
ATP Challenger (4)
ITF Futures (3)

No.	Date	Tournament	Tier	Surface	Partner	Opponents	Score
1.	Oct 2005	Ukraine F3, Illyichovsk	Futures	Clay	(Ukraine) Mikhail Filima	(Ukraine) Nikolai Dyachok (Ukraine) Oleksandr Nedovyesov	6–1, 6–3
2.	Jun 2007	Busan, South Korea	Challenger	Hard	(United States) John-Paul Fruttero	(Australia) Nathan Healey (Czech Republic) Jan Mertl	4–6, 7–6^{(7–5)}, [10–6]
3.	Aug 2007	Samarkand, Uzbekistan	Challenger	Clay	(Russia) Evgeny Kirillov	(Czech Republic) Jaroslav Pospíšil (Czech Republic) Adam Vejmělka	6–3, 6–2
4.	Jul 2011	Prostějov, Czech Republic	Challenger	Clay	(Spain) Adrián Menéndez Maceiras	(Spain) David Marrero (Spain) Rubén Ramírez Hidalgo	7–5, 6–2
5.	Mar 2014	Turkey F2, Antalya-Kaya Belek	Futures	Hard	(Germany) Sami Reinwein	(United States) Sean Berman (South Africa) Tucker Vorster	1–6, 7–6^{(7–5)}, [10–7]
6.	Jun 2014	Ukraine F9, Petrovske	Futures	Hard	(Ukraine) Denys Molchanov	(Ukraine) Olexiy Kolisnyk (Ukraine) Alexander Lebedyn	6–3, 6–2
7.	Jul 2014	Astana, Kazakhstan	Challenger	Hard	(Switzerland) Marco Chiudinelli	(Chinese Taipei) Chen Ti (Chinese Taipei) Huang Liang-chi	6–3, 6–4
