= Evgeny Kirillov =

Russian tennis player

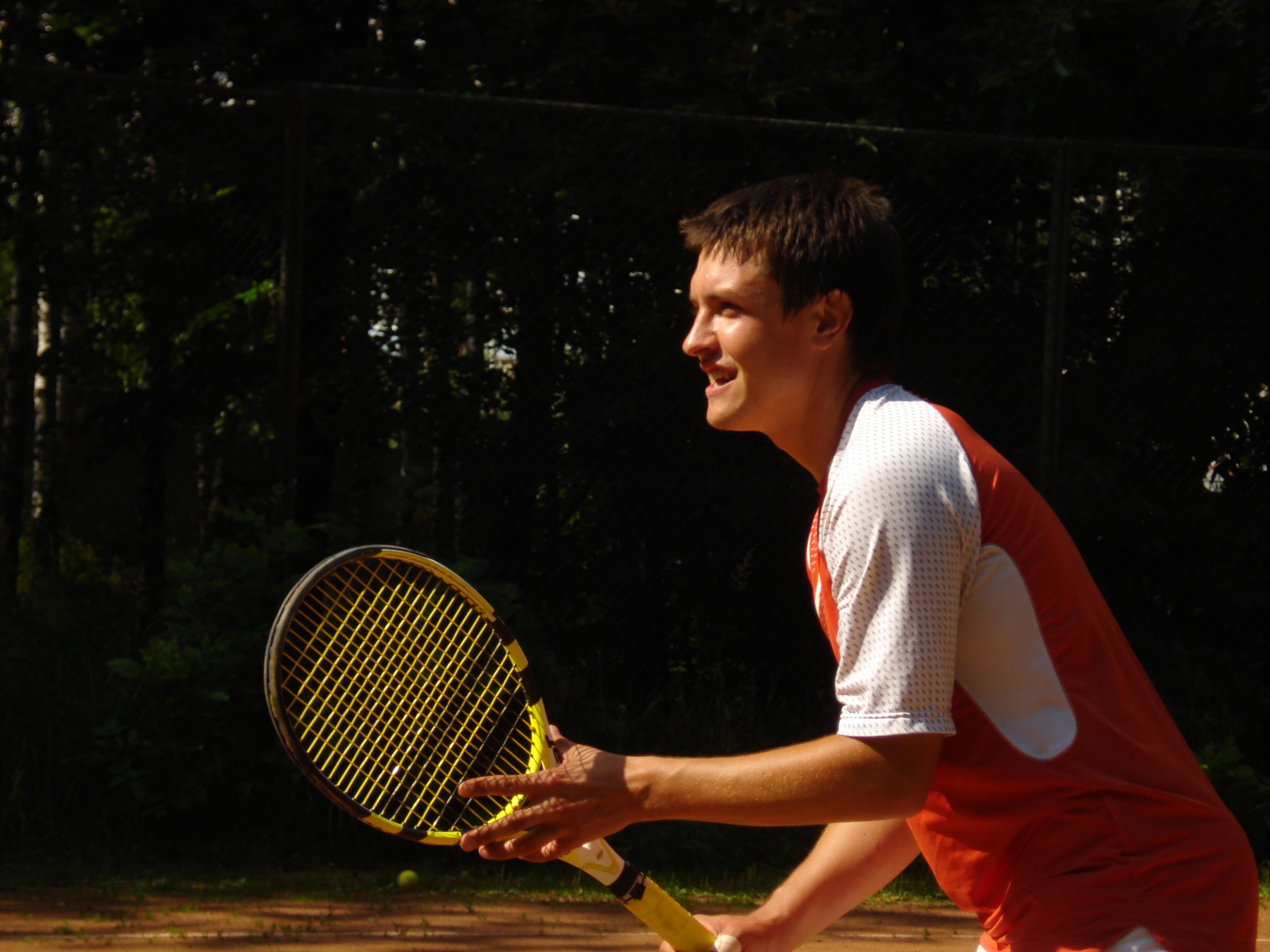
- Country (sports): Russia
- Residence: Moscow, Russia
- Born: 14 July 1987 (age 38) Mytishchi, Russian SFSR, Soviet Union
- Height: 1.83 m (6 ft 0 in)
- Turned pro: 2003
- Plays: Right-handed (two-handed backhand)
- Prize money: $179,027

Singles
- Career record: 0–1
- Career titles: 0
- Highest ranking: No. 205 (2 August 2010)

Grand Slam singles results
- Australian Open: –
- French Open: –
- Wimbledon: Q3 (2010)
- US Open: –

Doubles
- Career record: 0–1
- Career titles: 0
- Highest ranking: No. 195 (8 August 2008)
Medal record
Men's tennis
Representing Russia
Summer Universiade
| Silver medal – second place | 2005 Izmir | Singles |

Evgeny Kirillov (born 14 July 1987) is a Russian professional tennis player. Kirillov has a career high ATP singles ranking of No. 205 achieved on 2 August 2010 and a career high ATP doubles ranking of No. 195 achieved on 8 August 2008.

== ATP tournaments finals ==
=== Titles (7) ===
Legend
Challengers (1)
ITF Futures Series (6)

| No. | Date | Tournament | Surface | Opponent | Score |
|---|---|---|---|---|---|
| 1. | 20.11.2006 | Russia F2, Russia | Hard | (Kazakhstan) Mikhail Kukushkin | 6–3, 1–6, 6–3 |
| 2. | 08.09.2008 | Russia F7, Russia | Clay | (Russia) Ilya Belyaev | 6–2, 6–4 |
| 3. | 31.08.2009 | Russia F7, Russia | Clay | (Russia) Artem Sitak | 6–3, 6–0 |
| 4. | 07.09.2009 | Russia F8, Russia | Hard | (Uzbekistan) Vaja Uzakov | 6–0, 6–0 |
| 5. | 17.05.2010 | (Uzbekistan) Fergana | Hard | (China) Zhang Ze | 6–3, 2–6, 6–2 |
| 6. | 15.08.2011 | Russia F6, Russia | Clay | (Russia) Ivan Nedelko | 7–5, 7–5 |
| 7. | 13.02.2012 | Russia F5, Russia | Hard | (Serbia) Nikola Cacic | 7–6^{(7–3)}, 7–6^{(7–3)} |
