= 2015 Kazan Kremlin Cup – Doubles =

Doubles
- 2015 Kazan Kremlin Cup

Final
- Champions: (Russia) Mikhail Elgin (Slovakia) Igor Zelenay
- Runners-up: (Italy) Andrea Arnaboldi (Italy) Matteo Viola
- Score: 6–3, 6–3

Events
Singles	Doubles
← 2014 ·	Kazan Kremlin Cup	· 2016 →

Flavio Cipolla and Goran Tošić are the defending champions, but did not participate.

Mikhail Elgin and Igor Zelenay won the title, defeating Andrea Arnaboldi and Matteo Viola in the final, 6–3, 6–3.

== Seeds ==
1. (Belarus) Sergey Betov / (Belarus) Alexander Bury (first round)
2. (Poland) Mateusz Kowalczyk / (Poland) Michał Przysiężny (first round)
3. (Republic of Ireland) James Cluskey / (Lithuania) Laurynas Grigelis (quarterfinals)
4. (Russia) Konstantin Kravchuk / (Russia) Andrey Kuznetsov (semifinals)

== Draw ==
=== Key ===
- Q = Qualifier
- WC = Wild card
- LL = Lucky loser
- Alt = Alternate
- SE = Special exempt
- PR = Protected ranking
- ITF = ITF entry
- JE = Junior exempt
- w/o = Walkover
- r = Retired
- d = Defaulted
- SR = Special ranking

First round
1	(Belarus) S Betov (Belarus) A Bury	4	6	[6]
(France) A Michon (France) V Millot	6	3	[10]
(Bosnia and Herzegovina) M Bašić (Bosnia and Herzegovina) T Brkić	3	2
(Russia) M Elgin (Slovakia) I Zelenay	6	6
3	(Republic of Ireland) J Cluskey (Lithuania) L Grigelis	6^{5}	7	[10]
(Russia) E Donskoy (Russia) K Khachanov	7^{7}	5	[1]
WC	(Russia) Timur Kiuamov (Russia) R Muzaev	2	4
(Russia) A Karatsev (Russia) D Matsukevich	6	6
WC	(Russia) A Bublik (Russia) Vitaly Kozyukov	2	6^{6}
(Slovakia) M Mečíř Jr. (Slovakia) Adrian Sikora	6	7^{8}
WC	(Russia) M Ledovskikh (Russia) Pavel Selivanovsky	4	0
4	(Russia) K Kravchuk (Russia) A Kuznetsov	6	6
(Belarus) Y Shyla (Belarus) A Vasilevski	2	7	[10]
(Belarus) E Gerasimov (Belarus) D Zhyrmont	6	5	[6]
(Italy) A Arnaboldi (Italy) M Viola	6	7^{7}
2	(Poland) M Kowalczyk (Poland) M Przysiężny	3	6^{2}

Quarterfinals
(France) A Michon (France) V Millot	1	6	[7]
(Russia) M Elgin (Slovakia) I Zelenay	6	4	[10]
3	(Republic of Ireland) J Cluskey (Lithuania) L Grigelis	4	6	[5]
(Russia) A Karatsev (Russia) D Matsukevich	6	2	[10]
(Slovakia) M Mečíř Jr. (Slovakia) A Sikora	1	1
4	(Russia) K Kravchuk (Russia) A Kuznetsov	6	6
(Belarus) Y Shyla (Belarus) A Vasilevski	6	3	[6]
(Italy) A Arnaboldi (Italy) M Viola	4	6	[10]

Semifinals
(Russia) M Elgin (Slovakia) I Zelenay	6	6
(Russia) A Karatsev (Russia) D Matsukevich	4	2
4	(Russia) K Kravchuk (Russia) A Kuznetsov	7^{7}	4	[4]
(Italy) A Arnaboldi (Italy) M Viola	6^{5}	6	[10]

Final
(Russia) M Elgin (Slovakia) I Zelenay	6	6
(Italy) A Arnaboldi (Italy) M Viola	3	3
