= 2011 Kazan Kremlin Cup – Doubles =

Doubles
- 2011 Kazan Kremlin Cup

Final
- Champions: (Switzerland) Yves Allegro (Germany) Andreas Beck
- Runners-up: (Russia) Mikhail Elgin (Russia) Alexander Kudryavtsev
- Score: 6–4, 6–4

Events
Singles	Doubles
← 2010 ·	Kazan Kremlin Cup	· 2012 →

Jan Mertl and Yuri Schukin were the defending champions, but chose to not participate this year.
Yves Allegro and Andreas Beck won the final against Mikhail Elgin and Alexander Kudryavtsev 6–4, 6–4.

== Seeds ==
1. (Russia) Mikhail Elgin / (Russia) Alexander Kudryavtsev (final)
2. (Switzerland) Yves Allegro / (Germany) Andreas Beck (champions)
3. (Belarus) Uladzimir Ignatik / (Latvia) Deniss Pavlovs (first round)
4. (Germany) Dominik Meffert / (Germany) Simon Stadler (first round)

== Draw ==
=== Key ===
- Q = Qualifier
- WC = Wild card
- LL = Lucky loser
- Alt = Alternate
- SE = Special exempt
- PR = Protected ranking
- ITF = ITF entry
- JE = Junior exempt
- w/o = Walkover
- r = Retired
- d = Defaulted
- SR = Special ranking

=== Draw ===
First round
1	(Russia) M Elgin (Russia) A Kudryavtsev	6	6
(Italy) Andrea Arnaboldi (Spain) A Menéndez	3	4
WC	(Russia) V Baluda (Russia) Alexander Rumyantsev	3	0
(Romania) M Copil (Russia) D Matsukevich	6	6
4	(Germany) D Meffert (Germany) S Stadler	6	2	[8]
(Russia) I Belyaev (Russia) E Donskoy	2	6	[10]
(Russia) Mikhail Vasiliev (Estonia) J Zopp	6	6
WC	(Russia) Aleksandr Lobkov (Russia) Daniyal Zagidullin	1	1
WC	(Russia) A Manegin (Russia) Vitali Reshetnikov	6	7
(Russia) M Ledovskikh (Russia) V Rudnev	3	6^{4}
(Russia) E Kirillov (Russia) K Kravchuk	6	1	[10]
3	(Belarus) U Ignatik (Latvia) D Pavlovs	2	6	[4]
(Ukraine) S Bubka (Slovakia) M Semjan	1	6	[7]
(Belarus) Nikolai Fidirko (Israel) A Weintraub	6	4	[10]
(Republic of Ireland) James Cluskey (Slovakia) M Mečíř Jr.	6^{2}	4
2	(Switzerland) Y Allegro (Germany) A Beck	7	6

Quarterfinals
1	(Russia) M Elgin (Russia) A Kudryavtsev	6	6
(Romania) M Copil (Russia) D Matsukevich	3	2
(Russia) I Belyaev (Russia) E Donskoy	6^{4}	7	[7]
(Russia) Mikhail Vasiliev (Estonia) J Zopp	7	5	[10]
WC	(Russia) A Manegin (Russia) Vitali Reshetnikov	4	1
(Russia) E Kirillov (Russia) K Kravchuk	6	6
(Belarus) Nikolai Fidirko (Israel) A Weintraub	3	4
2	(Switzerland) Y Allegro (Germany) A Beck	6	6

Semifinals
1	(Russia) M Elgin (Russia) A Kudryavtsev	6	6
(Russia) Mikhail Vasiliev (Estonia) J Zopp	3	3
(Russia) E Kirillov (Russia) K Kravchuk	1	2
2	(Switzerland) Y Allegro (Germany) A Beck	6	6

Final
1	(Russia) M Elgin (Russia) A Kudryavtsev	4	4
2	(Switzerland) Y Allegro (Germany) A Beck	6	6
