= 2012 Kazan Kremlin Cup – Doubles =

Doubles
- 2012 Kazan Kremlin Cup

Final
- Champions: (Thailand) Sanchai Ratiwatana (Thailand) Sonchat Ratiwatana
- Runners-up: (Belarus) Alexander Bury (Poland) Mateusz Kowalczyk
- Score: 6–3, 6–1

Events
Singles	Doubles
← 2011 ·	Kazan Kremlin Cup	· 2013 →

Yves Allegro and Andreas Beck were the defending champions, but both players chose not to participate. Sanchai Ratiwatana and Sonchat Ratiwatana won the final 6–3, 6–1 against Alexander Bury and Mateusz Kowalczyk.

== Seeds ==
1. (Thailand) Sanchai Ratiwatana / (Thailand) Sonchat Ratiwatana (champions)
2. (Spain) Adrián Menéndez / (Spain) Daniel Muñoz-de la Nava (first round)
3. (Russia) Konstantin Kravchuk / (Russia) Alexander Kudryavtsev (first round)
4. (Russia) Evgeny Donskoy / (Russia) Teymuraz Gabashvili (quarterfinals)

== Draw ==
=== Key ===
- Q = Qualifier
- WC = Wild card
- LL = Lucky loser
- Alt = Alternate
- SE = Special exempt
- PR = Protected ranking
- ITF = ITF entry
- JE = Junior exempt
- w/o = Walkover
- r = Retired
- d = Defaulted
- SR = Special ranking

=== Draw ===
First round
1	(Thailand) Sa Ratiwatana (Thailand) So Ratiwatana	6	6
(Spain) A Brugués-Davi (Portugal) J Sousa	3	4
(Tunisia) M Jaziri (Russia) D Matsukevich	5	7	[4]
(Finland) H Heliövaara (Estonia) J Zopp	7	5	[10]
3	(Russia) K Kravchuk (Russia) A Kudryavtsev	4	5
WC	(Russia) Aslan Karatsev (Russia) Richard Muzaev	6	7
(Ukraine) S Bubka (Russia) E Kirillov	3	6	[10]
(Belgium) R Bemelmans (Belarus) U Ignatik	6	4	[4]
(Czech Republic) J Hájek (Czech Republic) I Minář	6	6
WC	(Romania) M Copil (Russia) Daniyal Zagidullin	1	0
WC	(Russia) I Belyaev (Russia) A Manegin	2	1
4	(Russia) E Donskoy (Russia) T Gabashvili	6	6
(Belarus) A Bury (Poland) M Kowalczyk	7	7^{7}
(Czech Republic) J Mertl (Czech Republic) J Pospíšil	5	6^{5}
(Czech Republic) D Lojda (Spain) J Martí	6	7^{10}
2	(Spain) A Menéndez (Spain) D Muñoz-de la Nava	4	6^{8}

Quarterfinals
1	(Thailand) Sa Ratiwatana (Thailand) So Ratiwatana	7^{7}	6
(Finland) H Heliövaara (Estonia) J Zopp	6^{5}	3
WC	(Russia) A Karatsev (Russia) R Muzaev	4	5
(Ukraine) S Bubka (Russia) E Kirillov	6	7
(Czech Republic) J Hájek (Czech Republic) I Minář	4	4
4	(Russia) E Donskoy (Russia) T Gabashvili	6	6
(Belarus) A Bury (Poland) M Kowalczyk	6	6
(Czech Republic) D Lojda (Spain) J Martí	4	3

Semifinals
1	(Thailand) Sa Ratiwatana (Thailand) So Ratiwatana	3	6	[11]
(Ukraine) S Bubka (Russia) E Kirillov	6	4	[9]
(Russia) E Donskoy (Russia) T Gabashvili
(Belarus) A Bury (Poland) M Kowalczyk	w/o

Final
1	(Thailand) Sa Ratiwatana (Thailand) So Ratiwatana	6	6
(Belarus) A Bury (Poland) M Kowalczyk	3	1
