= 2014 Kazan Kremlin Cup – Doubles =

Doubles
- 2014 Kazan Kremlin Cup

Final
- Champion: (Italy) Flavio Cipolla (Serbia) Goran Tošić
- Runner-up: (Russia) Victor Baluda (Russia) Konstantin Kravchuk
- Score: 3–6, 7–5, [12–10]

Events
Singles	Doubles
← 2013 ·	Kazan Kremlin Cup	· 2015 →

Radu Albot and Farrukh Dustov were the defending champions, but they decided not to play together. Dustov played alongside Alessandro Motti, and Radu Albot was absent from the tournament.

Flavio Cipolla and Goran Tošić won the title, defeating Victor Baluda and Konstantin Kravchuk in the final, 3–6, 7–5, [12–10].

== Seeds ==
1. (Australia) Rameez Junaid / (Germany) Philipp Marx (quarterfinals)
2. (Finland) Henri Kontinen / (Slovakia) Michal Mertiňák (semifinals)
3. (Russia) Victor Baluda / (Russia) Konstantin Kravchuk (final)
4. (Germany) Dominik Meffert / (Germany) Tim Puetz (quarterfinals)

== Draw ==
=== Key ===
- Q = Qualifier
- WC = Wild card
- LL = Lucky loser
- Alt = Alternate
- SE = Special exempt
- PR = Protected ranking
- ITF = ITF entry
- JE = Junior exempt
- w/o = Walkover
- r = Retired
- d = Defaulted
- SR = Special ranking

=== Draw ===
First round
1	(Australia) R Junaid (Germany) P Marx	7^{7}	7^{7}
(Poland) P Gadomski (Poland) M Kowalczyk	6^{5}	6^{3}
PR	(United Kingdom) J Delgado (Luxembourg) G Müller	6	6
WC	(Russia) S Strelkov (Russia) Philipp Tarpischev	1	3
4	(Germany) D Meffert (Germany) T Puetz	7^{7}	3	[10]
WC	(Russia) D Matsukevich (Russia) A Rublev	6^{3}	6	[6]
(Italy) F Cipolla (Serbia) G Tošić	7^{7}	4	6
PR	(France) A Michon (Estonia) J Zopp	6^{4}	6	[6]
(Republic of Ireland) J Cluskey (France) A Olivetti	6	6
(Germany) G Kretschmer (Germany) B Phau	4	3
PR	(Russia) A Kudryavtsev (Croatia) L Zovko	1	4
3	(Russia) V Baluda (Russia) K Kravchuk	6	6
(Uzbekistan) F Dustov (Italy) A Motti	2	6^{5}
(Belarus) S Betov (Russia) A Kuznetsov	6	7^{7}
WC	(Russia) Timur Kiuamov (Russia) Anton Schepelev	2	2
2	(Finland) H Kontinen (Slovakia) M Mertiňák	6	6

Quarterfinals
1	(Australia) R Junaid (Germany) P Marx	3	4
PR	(United Kingdom) J Delgado (Luxembourg) G Müller	6	6
4	(Germany) D Meffert (Germany) T Puetz	5	7	[8]
(Italy) F Cipolla (Serbia) G Tošić	7	5	[10]
(Republic of Ireland) J Cluskey (France) A Olivetti	7	6^{4}	6
3	(Russia) V Baluda (Russia) K Kravchuk	5	7^{7}	10
(Belarus) S Betov (Russia) A Kuznetsov	3	4
2	(Finland) H Kontinen (Slovakia) M Mertiňák	6	6

Semifinals
PR	(United Kingdom) J Delgado (Luxembourg) G Müller	7	2^{r}
(Italy) F Cipolla (Serbia) G Tošić	5	4
3	(Russia) V Baluda (Russia) K Kravchuk	6	6
2	(Finland) H Kontinen (Slovakia) M Mertiňák	4	2

Final
(Italy) F Cipolla (Serbia) G Tošić	3	7	[12]
3	(Russia) V Baluda (Russia) K Kravchuk	6	5	[10]
