= 2011 Kazan Kremlin Cup – Singles =

Singles
- 2011 Kazan Kremlin Cup

Final
- Champion: (Romania) Marius Copil
- Runner-up: (Germany) Andreas Beck
- Score: 6–4, 6–4

Events
Singles	Doubles
← 2010 ·	Kazan Kremlin Cup	· 2012 →

Michał Przysiężny was the defending champion, but decided not to participate.
Marius Copil won this tournament, by defeating 4th seed Andreas Beck 6–4, 6–4 in the final.

== Seeds ==
1. (Republic of Ireland) Conor Niland (first round, retired)
2. (Russia) Konstantin Kravchuk (second round)
3. (Russia) Alexandre Kudryavtsev (first round)
4. (Germany) Andreas Beck (final)
5. (Spain) Roberto Bautista-Agut (second round)
6. (Belarus) Uladzimir Ignatik (second round)
7. (Estonia) Jürgen Zopp (Quarterfinal)
8. (Slovakia) Marek Semjan (first round)

== Draw ==
Key

- Q = Qualifier
- WC = Wild card
- LL = Lucky loser
- Alt = Alternate
- ITF = ITF entry
- PR = Protected ranking
- SR = Special ranking
- SE = Special exempt
- JE = Junior exempt
- JR = Junior Accelerator Programme entrant
- CO = College Accelerator Programme entrant
- NG = Next Gen Accelerator Program entrant
- w/o = Walkover
- r = Retired
- d = Defaulted

=== Finals ===
Semifinals
PR	(Germany) Dominik Meffert	2	6	3
(Romania) Marius Copil	6	3	6
4	(Germany) Andreas Beck	7	6
(Russia) Evgeny Kirillov	6^{6}	4

Final
(Romania) Marius Copil	6	6
4	(Germany) Andreas Beck	4	4

=== Top half ===
First round
1	(Republic of Ireland) C Niland	1	r
(Russia) I Belyaev	4
WC	(Russia) A Manegin	0	2
(Russia) Alexander Lobkov	6	6
Q	(Russia) Alexander Rumyantsev	6	3	5
PR	(Germany) D Meffert	2	6	7
(Israel) A Weintraub	1	2
6	(Belarus) U Ignatik	6	6
3	(Russia) A Kudryavtsev	3	6^{3}
(Romania) M Copil	6	7
Q	(Latvia) D Pavlovs	6	2	6^{1}
(Spain) A Menéndez	2	6	7
(Germany) S Stadler	6	6
(Russia) Mikhail Vasiliev	1	2
Q	(Belarus) A Bury	2	6	6
8	(Slovakia) M Semjan	6	3	3

Second round
(Russia) I Belyaev	6	6
(Russia) Alexander Lobkov	4	1
PR	(Germany) D Meffert	6	6
6	(Belarus) U Ignatik	2	3
(Romania) M Copil	6	6
(Spain) A Menéndez	3	4
(Germany) S Stadler	6	6
Q	(Belarus) A Bury	4	1

Quarterfinals
(Russia) I Belyaev	6	1	4
PR	(Germany) D Meffert	4	6	6
(Romania) M Copil	6	6
(Germany) S Stadler	4	4

Semifinals
PR	(Germany) D Meffert	2	6	3
(Romania) M Copil	6	3	6

=== Bottom half ===
First round
7	(Estonia) J Zopp	6	7
(Finland) H Kontinen	3	5
(Italy) Andrea Arnaboldi	7	6
(Russia) M Elgin	5	4
LL	(Russia) V Rudnev	2	1
(Russia) E Donskoy	6	6
(Slovakia) M Mečíř Jr.	4	1
4	(Germany) A Beck	6	6
5	(Spain) R Bautista-Agut	6	6
(Russia) D Matsukevich	2	3
Q	(Russia) M Ledovskikh	6	0	6^{6}
(Russia) E Kirillov	3	6	7
WC	(Russia) V Baluda	2	4
(Ukraine) S Bubka	6	6
(Russia) Daniyal Zagidullin	3	0
2	(Russia) K Kravchuk	6	6

Second round
7	(Estonia) J Zopp	7	6
(Italy) Andrea Arnaboldi	5	3
(Russia) E Donskoy	4	4
4	(Germany) A Beck	6	6
5	(Spain) R Bautista-Agut	4	4
(Russia) E Kirillov	6	6
(Ukraine) S Bubka	6	6
2	(Russia) K Kravchuk	3	2

Quarterfinals
7	(Estonia) J Zopp	3	6^{0}
4	(Germany) A Beck	6	7
(Russia) E Kirillov	6	6
(Ukraine) S Bubka	4	3

Semifinals
4	(Germany) A Beck	7	6
(Russia) E Kirillov	6^{6}	4
