= 2012 Kazan Kremlin Cup – Singles =

Tennis contest held in Kazan

Singles
- 2012 Kazan Kremlin Cup

Final
- Champion: (Estonia) Jürgen Zopp
- Runner-up: (Romania) Marius Copil
- Score: 7–6^{(7–4)}, 7–6^{(7–4)}

Events
Singles	Doubles
← 2011 ·	Kazan Kremlin Cup	· 2013 →

Marius Copil was the defending champion but lost the final to Jürgen Zopp, 7–6^{(7–4)}, 7–6^{(7–4)}.

== Seeds ==
1. (Tunisia) Malek Jaziri (second round)
2. (Austria) Andreas Haider-Maurer (second round)
3. (Spain) Arnau Brugués-Davi (first round)
4. (Spain) Daniel Muñoz-de la Nava (first round)
5. (Czech Republic) Jan Hájek (second round)
6. (Russia) Teymuraz Gabashvili (semifinals, withdrew due to left knee injury)
7. (Russia) Evgeny Donskoy (second round)
8. (Estonia) Jürgen Zopp (champion)

== Draw ==
=== Key ===
- Q = Qualifier
- WC = Wild card
- LL = Lucky loser
- Alt = Alternate
- ITF = ITF entry
- PR = Protected ranking
- SR = Special ranking
- SE = Special exempt
- JE = Junior exempt
- JR = Junior Accelerator Programme entrant
- CO = College Accelerator Programme entrant
- NG = Next Gen Accelerator Program entrant
- w/o = Walkover
- r = Retired
- d = Defaulted

=== Finals ===
Semifinals
6	(Russia) Teymuraz Gabashvili
8	(Estonia) Jürgen Zopp	w/o
(Czech Republic) Ivo Minář	3	4
(Romania) Marius Copil	6	6

Final
8	(Estonia) Jürgen Zopp	7^{7}	7^{7}
(Romania) Marius Copil	6^{4}	6^{4}

=== Top half ===
First round
1	(Tunisia) M Jaziri	6	6
(Russia) K Kravchuk	4	2
(Spain) J Martí	6	6
WC	(Russia) Aydin Akhmetshin	1	0
(Czech Republic) D Lojda	6	6
WC	(Russia) S Vovk	3	1
Q	(Moldova) R Albot	1	2
6	(Russia) T Gabashvili	6	6
4	(Spain) D Muñoz-de la Nava	4	6^{5}
(Spain) A Menéndez	6	7^{7}
(Belgium) R Bemelmans	6	5	6
LL	(Russia) D Matsukevich	4	7	1
(Ukraine) S Bubka	4	4
(Finland) H Heliövaara	6	6
Q	(Italy) T Fabbiano	6^{6}	2
8	(Estonia) J Zopp	7^{8}	6

Second round
1	(Tunisia) M Jaziri	3	6	4
(Spain) J Martí	6	2	6
(Czech Republic) D Lojda	2	3
6	(Russia) T Gabashvili	6	6
(Spain) A Menéndez	3	7	6^{5}
(Belgium) R Bemelmans	6	5	7^{7}
(Finland) H Heliövaara	3	2
8	(Estonia) J Zopp	6	6

Quarterfinals
(Spain) J Martí	6^{4}	6	4
6	(Russia) T Gabashvili	7^{7}	3	6
(Belgium) R Bemelmans	2	0
8	(Estonia) J Zopp	6	6

Semifinals
6	(Russia) T Gabashvili
8	(Estonia) Jürgen Zopp	w/o

=== Bottom half ===
First round
5	(Czech Republic) J Hájek	6	6
(Portugal) J Sousa	3	4
Q	(Russia) M Ledovskikh	7	5	6
Q	(Russia) E Kirillov	5	7	3
LL	(Ukraine) I Marchenko	7^{7}	2	1
(Czech Republic) I Minář	6^{5}	6	6
(Czech Republic) J Pospíšil	6	6
3	(Spain) A Brugués-Davi	3	1
7	(Russia) E Donskoy	6	6
WC	(Russia) A Manegin	0	2
WC	(Russia) Daniyal Zagidullin	1	2
(Russia) A Kudryavtsev	6	6
(Israel) A Weintraub	2	1
(Romania) M Copil	6	6
(Belarus) U Ignatik	2	4
2	(Austria) A Haider-Maurer	6	6

Second round
5	(Czech Republic) J Hájek	6	6^{6}	4
Q	(Russia) M Ledovskikh	4	7^{8}	6
(Czech Republic) I Minář	6	4	6
(Czech Republic) J Pospíšil	2	6	3
7	(Russia) E Donskoy	6^{3}	1
(Russia) A Kudryavtsev	7^{7}	6
(Romania) M Copil	6	6
2	(Austria) A Haider-Maurer	4	4

Quarterfinals
Q	(Russia) M Ledovskikh	1	2
(Czech Republic) I Minář	6	6
(Russia) A Kudryavtsev	6	3	4
(Romania) M Copil	4	6	6

Semifinals
(Czech Republic) I Minář	3	4
(Romania) M Copil	6	6
