= 2010 Kazan Kremlin Cup – Singles =

Singles
- 2010 Kazan Kremlin Cup

Final
- Champion: (Poland) Michał Przysiężny
- Runner-up: (Germany) Julian Reister
- Score: 7–6(5), 6–4

Events
Singles	Doubles
- Kazan Kremlin Cup

Michał Przysiężny won in the final 7–6(5), 6–4 against Julian Reister.

== Seeds ==
1. (Germany) Julian Reister (final)
2. (Poland) Michał Przysiężny (champion)
3. (Kazakhstan) Yuri Schukin (quarterfinals)
4. (Russia) Alexandre Kudryavtsev (first round)
5. (Ukraine) Ivan Sergeyev (second round, retired)
6. (Spain) Adrián Menéndez-Maceiras (second round)
7. (Russia) Konstantin Kravchuk (quarterfinals, retired)
8. (Slovakia) Pavol Červenák (quarterfinals)

== Draw ==
Key

- Q = Qualifier
- WC = Wild card
- LL = Lucky loser
- Alt = Alternate
- ITF = ITF entry
- PR = Protected ranking
- SR = Special ranking
- SE = Special exempt
- JE = Junior exempt
- JR = Junior Accelerator Programme entrant
- CO = College Accelerator Programme entrant
- NG = Next Gen Accelerator Program entrant
- w/o = Walkover
- r = Retired
- d = Defaulted

=== Finals ===
Semifinals
1	(Germany) Julian Reister	6^{10}	6	6
(Republic of Ireland) Conor Niland	7	4	4
(Germany) Tobias Kamke	3	4
2	(Poland) Michał Przysiężny	6	6

Final
1	(Germany) Julian Reister	6^{5}	4
2	(Poland) Michał Przysiężny	7	6

=== Top half ===
First round
1	(Germany) J Reister	6	6
WC	(Russia) D Zagidullin	0	0
Q	(Russia) A Lobkov	6	1	5
Q	(Russia) D Matsukevich	3	6	7
(Republic of Ireland) L Sorensen	2	4
Q	(Russia) E Donskoy	6	6
(Belgium) D Goffin	2	2
8	(Slovakia) P Červenák	6	6
4	(Russia) A Kudryavtsev	2	6	1
(Ukraine) S Bubka	6	4	6
WC	(Russia) A Manegin	3	2
(Republic of Ireland) C Niland	6	6
(Spain) R Bautista-Agut	6	7
(Morocco) R El Amrani	3	6^{3}
WC	(Russia) M Gilmanov	3	2
7	(Russia) K Kravchuk	6	6

Second round
1	(Germany) J Reister	7	6
Q	(Russia) D Matsukevich	5	1
Q	(Russia) E Donskoy	6^{6}	3
8	(Slovakia) P Červenák	7	6
(Ukraine) S Bubka	3	3
(Republic of Ireland) C Niland	6	6
(Spain) R Bautista-Agut	7	4	6^{0}
7	(Russia) K Kravchuk	6^{5}	6	7

Quarterfinals
1	(Germany) J Reister	6	6
8	(Slovakia) P Červenák	3	2
(Republic of Ireland) C Niland	6	1
7	(Russia) K Kravchuk	2	0	r

Semifinals
1	(Germany) J Reister	6^{10}	6	6
(Republic of Ireland) C Niland	7	4	4

=== Bottom half ===
First round
6	(Spain) A Menéndez-Maceiras	6	6
WC	(Russia) V Gorshenin	2	3
(Germany) T Kamke	6	2
(Germany) N Langer	1	0	r
(Kazakhstan) A Kedryuk	6	2
(Slovakia) K Čapkovič	3	0	r
PR	(Czech Republic) J Mertl	3	6^{4}
3	(Kazakhstan) Y Schukin	6	7
5	(Ukraine) I Sergeyev	7	6
(Russia) V Rudnev	6^{3}	4
(Montenegro) G Tošić	6	3	7
Q	(Russia) M Ledovskikh	4	6	6^{5}
(Germany) G Kretschmer	3	0
(Russia) E Kirillov	6	6
(Russia) A Kuznetsov	4	3
2	(Poland) M Przysiężny	6	6

Second round
6	(Spain) A Menéndez-Maceiras	4	5
(Germany) T Kamke	6	7
(Kazakhstan) A Kedryuk	6	3	3
3	(Kazakhstan) Y Schukin	3	6	6
5	(Ukraine) I Sergeyev	1	1	r
(Montenegro) G Tošić	6	2
(Russia) E Kirillov	6	2	6^{5}
2	(Poland) M Przysiężny	3	6	7

Quarterfinals
(Germany) T Kamke	6	6
3	(Kazakhstan) Y Schukin	1	4
(Montenegro) G Tošić	3	2
2	(Poland) M Przysiężny	6	6

Semifinals
(Germany) T Kamke	3	4
2	(Poland) M Przysiężny	6	6
