= 2011 Kazan Kremlin Cup =

- Date: 31 January – 6 February
- Edition: 2nd
- Location: Kazan, Russia

Champions

Singles
- (Romania) Marius Copil

Doubles
- (Switzerland) Yves Allegro / (Germany) Andreas Beck
| ← 2010 · | Kazan Kremlin Cup | · 2012 → |

The 2011 Kazan Kremlin Cup was a professional tennis tournament played on indoor hard courts. It was the second edition of the tournament which was part of the 2011 ATP Challenger Tour and the Tretorn SERIE+ series. It took place in Kazan, Russia between 31 January and 6 February 2011.

== ATP entrants ==
=== Seeds ===
| Country | Player | Rank^{1} | Seed |
|---|---|---|---|
| IRL | Conor Niland | 130 | 1 |
| RUS | Konstantin Kravchuk | 143 | 2 |
| RUS | Alexander Kudryavtsev | 147 | 3 |
| GER | Andreas Beck | 155 | 4 |
| ESP | Roberto Bautista Agut | 171 | 5 |
| BLR | Uladzimir Ignatik | 201 | 6 |
| EST | Jürgen Zopp | 219 | 7 |
| SVK | Marek Semjan | 226 | 8 |

- Rankings are as of January 17, 2011.

=== Other entrants ===
The following players received wildcards into the singles main draw:

- (Russia) Victor Baluda
- (Russia) Anton Manegin
- (Uzbekistan) Vaja Uzakov
- (Russia) Daniyal Zagidullin

The following players received entry from the qualifying draw:

- (Belarus) Aliaksandr Bury
- (Russia) Mikhail Ledovskikh
- (Latvia) Deniss Pavlovs
- (Russia) Alexander Rumyantsev

== Champions ==
=== Singles ===
(Romania) Marius Copil def. (Germany) Andreas Beck, 6–4, 6–4

=== Doubles ===
(Switzerland) Yves Allegro / (Germany) Andreas Beck def. (Russia) Mikhail Elgin / (Russia) Alexander Kudryavtsev, 6–4, 6–4
