= 2014 Kazan Kremlin Cup – Singles =

Tennis contest held in Kazan

Singles
- 2014 Kazan Kremlin Cup

Final
- Champion: (Turkey) Marsel İlhan
- Runner-up: (Germany) Michael Berrer
- Score: 7–6^{(8–6)}, 6–3

Events
Singles	Doubles
← 2013 ·	Kazan Kremlin Cup	· 2015 →

Oleksandr Nedovyesov was the defending champion, but decided not to compete.

Marsel İlhan won the title, defeating Michael Berrer in the final, 7–6^{(8–6)}, 6–3.

== Seeds ==
1. (Germany) Michael Berrer (final)
2. (Russia) Andrey Kuznetsov (semifinals)
3. (Lithuania) Ričardas Berankis (quarterfinals)
4. (Slovakia) Norbert Gomboš (quarterfinals)
5. (Turkey) Marsel İlhan (champion)
6. (Uzbekistan) Farrukh Dustov (semifinals)
7. (Serbia) Ilija Bozoljac (second round, retired)
8. (France) Albano Olivetti (quarterfinals)

== Draw ==
=== Key ===
- Q = Qualifier
- WC = Wild card
- LL = Lucky loser
- Alt = Alternate
- ITF = ITF entry
- PR = Protected ranking
- SR = Special ranking
- SE = Special exempt
- JE = Junior exempt
- JR = Junior Accelerator Programme entrant
- CO = College Accelerator Programme entrant
- NG = Next Gen Accelerator Program entrant
- w/o = Walkover
- r = Retired
- d = Defaulted

=== Finals ===
Semifinals
1	(Germany) Michael Berrer	6	3	6
6	(Uzbekistan) Farrukh Dustov	4	6	3
5	(Turkey) Marsel İlhan	0	6	7
2	(Russia) Andrey Kuznetsov	6	3	5

Final
1	(Germany) Michael Berrer	6^{6}	3
5	(Turkey) Marsel İlhan	7^{8}	6

=== Top half ===
First round
1	(Germany) M Berrer	6	6
(Germany) B Phau	3	2
(France) A Michon	6	6
(Russia) V Rudnev	1	2
(Czech Republic) J Mertl	3	2
(Italy) F Cipolla	6	6
LL	(Croatia) N Mektić	6	2	4
8	(France) A Olivetti	4	6	6
3	(Lithuania) R Berankis	6	6
WC	(Turkey) B Erguden	0	0
(Russia) A Kudryavtsev	6	6
WC	(Russia) Timur Kiuamov	4	2
(Slovakia) M Mečíř	6	6
WC	(Russia) Vaja Uzakov	2	4
(Bosnia and Herzegovina) M Bašić	6	2	2
6	(Uzbekistan) F Dustov	2	6	6

Second round
1	(Germany) M Berrer	7^{7}	6
(France) A Michon	6^{4}	3
(Italy) F Cipolla	6	4	3
8	(France) A Olivetti	4	6	6
3	(Lithuania) R Berankis	6	6
(Russia) A Kudryavtsev	0	3
(Slovakia) M Mečíř	5	2
6	(Uzbekistan) F Dustov	7	6

Quarterfinals
1	(Germany) M Berrer	6	3	7^{7}
8	(France) A Olivetti	4	6	6^{4}
3	(Lithuania) R Berankis	0	3
6	(Uzbekistan) F Dustov	6	6

Semifinals
1	(Germany) M Berrer	6	3	6
6	(Uzbekistan) F Dustov	4	6	3

=== Bottom half ===
First round
5	(Turkey) M İlhan	6	6
PR	(Ukraine) S Bubka	2	4
(Lithuania) L Grigelis	6	6
(France) M Teixeira	2	1
Q	(Russia) D Matsukevich	4	6	6
(Russia) K Kravchuk	6	3	3
(Italy) M Viola	4	0
4	(Slovakia) Gomboš	6	6
7	(Serbia) I Bozoljac	6	6
WC	(Russia) A Rublev	2	4
(Germany) T Puetz	3	4
Q	(Luxembourg) G Müller	6	6
(Czech Republic) J Pospíšil	6	6^{6}	6
Q	(Germany) D Meffert	1	7^{8}	4
(Belarus) E Gerasimov	4	7	6^{7}
2	(Russia) A Kuznetsov	6	5	7^{9}

Second round
5	(Turkey) M İlhan	6	6
(Lithuania) L Grigelis	4	3
Q	(Russia) D Matsukevich	4	1
4	(Slovakia) N Gomboš	6	6
7	(Serbia) I Bozoljac	2^{r}
Q	(Luxembourg) G Müller	4
(Czech Republic) J Pospíšil	2	4
2	(Russia) A Kuznetsov	6	6

Quarterfinals
5	(Turkey) M İlhan	7	6
4	(Slovakia) N Gomboš	5	2
Q	(Luxembourg) G Müller	4	4
2	(Russia) A Kuznetsov	6	6

Semifinals
5	(Turkey) M İlhan	0	6	7
2	(Russia) A Kuznetsov	6	3	5
