= 2015 Kazan Kremlin Cup – Singles =

Tennis contest held in Kazan

Singles
- 2015 Kazan Kremlin Cup

Final
- Champion: (Russia) Aslan Karatsev
- Runner-up: (Russia) Konstantin Kravchuk
- Score: 6–4, 4–6, 6–3

Events
Singles	Doubles
← 2014 ·	Kazan Kremlin Cup	· 2016 →

Marsel İlhan was the defending champion, but he lost in quarterfinals to Konstantin Kravchuk.

Aslan Karatsev won the title, defeating Konstantin Kravchuk in the final, 6–4, 4–6, 6–3.

== Seeds ==
1. (Turkey) Marsel İlhan (quarterfinals)
2. (Russia) Andrey Kuznetsov (second round)
3. (Ukraine) Illya Marchenko (first round)
4. (Poland) Michał Przysiężny (quarterfinals)
5. (Russia) Evgeny Donskoy (quarterfinals)
6. (Estonia) Jürgen Zopp (second round)
7. (Russia) Konstantin Kravchuk (final)
8. (Italy) Andrea Arnaboldi (quarterfinals)

== Draw ==
=== Key ===
- Q = Qualifier
- WC = Wild card
- LL = Lucky loser
- Alt = Alternate
- ITF = ITF entry
- PR = Protected ranking
- SR = Special ranking
- SE = Special exempt
- JE = Junior exempt
- JR = Junior Accelerator Programme entrant
- CO = College Accelerator Programme entrant
- NG = Next Gen Accelerator Program entrant
- w/o = Walkover
- r = Retired
- d = Defaulted

=== Finals ===
Semifinals
7	(Russia) Konstantin Kravchuk	2	6	6
Q	(Slovakia) Adrian Sikora	6	4	4
(India) Yuki Bhambri	6	0	4
(Russia) Aslan Karatsev	4	6	6

Final
7	(Russia) Konstantin Kravchuk	4	6	3
(Russia) Aslan Karatsev	6	4	6

=== Top half ===
First round
1	(Turkey) M İlhan	7^{7}	6
(Italy) M Viola	6^{5}	3
(Belarus) D Zhyrmont	6	5	6
(France) L Lokoli	2	7	2
(France) V Millot	1	5
(Belarus) E Gerasimov	6	7
(France) A Michon	7^{7}	2	5
7	(Russia) K Kravchuk	6^{3}	6	7
4	(Poland) M Przysiężny	7	6
Q	(Belarus) S Betov	5	3
(Slovakia) F Horanský	2	1
(Slovakia) M Mečíř Jr.	6	6
(Bosnia and Herzegovina) T Brkić	2	7	3
Q	(Slovakia) Adrian Sikora	6	5	6
Q	(Russia) M Elgin	4	3
6	(Estonia) J Zopp	6	6

Second round
1	(Turkey) M İlhan	6	7
(Belarus) D Zhyrmont	3	5
(Belarus) E Gerasimov	6^{1}	3
7	(Russia) K Kravchuk	7^{7}	6
4	(Poland) M Przysiężny	6^{3}	7^{7}	6
(Slovakia) M Mečíř Jr.	7^{7}	6^{3}	3
Q	(Slovakia) A Sikora	6	6
6	(Estonia) J Zopp	4	4

Quarterfinals
1	(Turkey) M İlhan	4	6^{5}
7	(Russia) K Kravchuk	6	7^{7}
4	(Poland) M Przysiężny	7^{7}	2	6^{4}
Q	(Slovakia) A Sikora	6^{4}	6	7^{7}

Semifinals
7	(Russia) K Kravchuk	2	6	6
Q	(Slovakia) A Sikora	6	4	4

=== Bottom half ===
First round
8	(Italy) A Arnaboldi	6	6
(France) E Couacaud	3	2
WC	(Russia) Vitaly Kozyukov	2	4
Q	(Lithuania) L Grigelis	6	6
WC	(Russia) Timur Kiuamov	0	2
WC	(Russia) K Khachanov	6	6
(India) Y Bhambri	4	7^{9}	6
3	(Ukraine) I Marchenko	6	6^{7}	2
5	(Russia) E Donskoy	7	6
(Bosnia and Herzegovina) M Bašić	5	2
(Spain) Jaime Pulgar-García	4	3
WC	(Russia) Evgeny Elistratov	6	6
(Slovakia) I Klec	6^{3}	3
(Russia) A Karatsev	7^{7}	6
(Russia) A Zaitcev	2	5
2	(Russia) A Kuznetsov	6	7

Second round
8	(Italy) A Arnaboldi	3	6	7^{12}
Q	(Lithuania) L Grigelis	6	4	6^{10}
WC	(Russia) K Khachanov	6	4	2
(India) Y Bhambri	4	6	6
5	(Russia) E Donskoy	6	6
WC	(Russia) E Elistratov	0	4
(Russia) A Karatsev	7	6
2	(Russia) A Kuznetsov	5	2

Quarterfinals
8	(Italy) A Arnaboldi	4	1
(India) Y Bhambri	6	6
5	(Russia) E Donskoy	4	1
(Russia) A Karatsev	6	6

Semifinals
(India) Y Bhambri	6	0	4
(Russia) A Karatsev	4	6	6
