= 2016 Kazan Kremlin Cup – Singles =

Tennis contest held in Kazan

Singles
- 2016 Kazan Kremlin Cup

Final
- Champion: (Germany) Tobias Kamke
- Runner-up: (Russia) Aslan Karatsev
- Score: 6–4, 6–2

Events
Singles	Doubles
- Kazan Kremlin Cup

Aslan Karatsev was the defending champion, but was defeated in the final by Tobias Kamke 6–4, 6–2.

== Seeds ==
1. (Lithuania) Ričardas Berankis (first round)
2. (Portugal) Gastão Elias (first round)
3. (Russia) Konstantin Kravchuk (semifinals)
4. (Moldova) Radu Albot (second round)
5. (Russia) Karen Khachanov (quarterfinals)
6. (Slovakia) Norbert Gombos (second round)
7. (Belarus) Egor Gerasimov (first round)
8. (Estonia) Jürgen Zopp (withdrew)

== Draw ==
Key

- Q = Qualifier
- WC = Wild card
- LL = Lucky loser
- Alt = Alternate
- ITF = ITF entry
- PR = Protected ranking
- SR = Special ranking
- SE = Special exempt
- JE = Junior exempt
- JR = Junior Accelerator Programme entrant
- CO = College Accelerator Programme entrant
- NG = Next Gen Accelerator Program entrant
- w/o = Walkover
- r = Retired
- d = Defaulted

=== Finals ===
Semifinals
WC	(Russia) Daniil Medvedev	4	1
(Russia) Aslan Karatsev	6	6
3	(Russia) Konstantin Kravchuk	3	1
(Germany) Tobias Kamke	6	6

Final
(Russia) Aslan Karatsev	4	2
(Germany) Tobias Kamke	6	6

=== Top half ===
First round
1	(Lithuania) R Berankis	4	6	4
WC	(Russia) D Medvedev	6	3	6
(Bosnia and Herzegovina) A Šetkić	6	5	4
WC	(Russia) A Bublik	4	7	6
Q	(Belarus) I Ivashka	6	7
Q	(Russia) M Kalovelonis	0	5
(Uzbekistan) F Dustov	6	2	6
7	(Belarus) E Gerasimov	3	6	3
4	(Moldova) R Albot	6	7
(Belarus) U Ignatik	3	5
(Russia) A Karatsev	6^{2}	6	7^{12}
(France) G Barrère	7^{7}	1	6^{10}
(France) D Guez	4	1
(Spain) D Pérez Sanz	6	6
(Kazakhstan) D Popko	2	2
5	(Russia) K Khachanov	6	6

Second round
WC	(Russia) D Medvedev	6	7^{7}
WC	(Russia) A Bublik	2	6^{3}
Q	(Belarus) I Ivashka	6	6
(Uzbekistan) F Dustov	3	1
4	(Moldova) R Albot	7^{7}	2	6^{2}
(Russia) A Karatsev	6^{3}	6	7^{7}
(Spain) D Pérez Sanz	2	6^{5}
5	(Russia) K Khachanov	6	7^{7}

Quarterfinals
WC	(Russia) D Medvedev	4	6	6
Q	(Belarus) I Ivashka	6	4	1
(Russia) A Karatsev	6	6
5	(Russia) K Khachanov	3	3

Semifinals
WC	(Russia) D Medvedev	4	1
(Russia) A Karatsev	6	6

=== Bottom half ===
First round
6	(Slovakia) N Gombos	6	7^{7}
WC	(Russia) Alexander Boborykin	4	6^{3}
Q	(France) A Sidorenko	6	6
LL	(Belarus) M Dubarenco	4	3
(Russia) D Matsukevich	2	6	2
Q	(Belarus) D Zhyrmont	6	2	6
(Italy) M Viola	6^{1}	6^{5}
3	(Russia) K Kravchuk	7^{7}	7^{7}
LL	(Russia) A Vatutin	6	6
(Serbia) M Janković	4	2
(Kazakhstan) A Nedovyesov	6	6
(Italy) F Cipolla	4	3
(Germany) T Kamke	7^{7}	6
PR	(France) A Olivetti	6^{4}	2
(France) T Lamasine	6	7^{7}
2	(Portugal) G Elias	3	6^{3}

Second round
6	(Slovakia) N Gombos	3	5
Q	(France) A Sidorenko	6	7
Q	(Belarus) D Zhyrmont	4	4
3	(Russia) K Kravchuk	6	6
LL	(Russia) A Vatutin	7^{7}	6^{4}	1
(Kazakhstan) A Nedovyesov	6^{3}	7^{7}	6
(Germany) T Kamke	6	6
(France) T Lamasine	3	4

Quarterfinals
Q	(France) A Sidorenko	3	0^{r}
3	(Russia) K Kravchuk	6	0
(Kazakhstan) A Nedovyesov	2	5
(Germany) T Kamke	6	7

Semifinals
3	(Russia) K Kravchuk	3	1
(Germany) T Kamke	6	6
