= 2010 Kazan Kremlin Cup – Doubles =

Doubles
- 2010 Kazan Kremlin Cup

Final
- Champions: (Czech Republic) Jan Mertl (Kazakhstan) Yuri Schukin
- Runners-up: (Germany) Tobias Kamke (Germany) Julian Reister
- Score: 6–2, 6–4

Events
Singles	Doubles
- Kazan Kremlin Cup

Jan Mertl and Yuri Schukin won in the final 6–2, 6–4, against Tobias Kamke and Julian Reister.

== Seeds ==
1. (Russia) Michail Elgin / (Russia) Alexandre Kudryavtsev (second round)
2. (Kazakhstan) Alexey Kedryuk / (Russia) Denis Matsukevich (second round)
3. (Russia) Evgeny Kirillov / (Russia) Konstantin Kravchuk (first round)
4. (Ukraine) Ivan Anikanov / (Russia) Andrey Kumantsov (second round)

== Draw ==
Key

- Q = Qualifier
- WC = Wild card
- LL = Lucky loser
- Alt = Alternate
- ITF = ITF entry
- PR = Protected ranking
- SR = Special ranking
- SE = Special exempt
- JE = Junior exempt
- JR = Junior Accelerator Programme entrant
- CO = College Accelerator Programme entrant
- NG = Next Gen Accelerator Program entrant
- w/o = Walkover
- r = Retired
- d = Defaulted

=== Draw ===
First round
1	(Russia) M Elgin (Russia) A Kudryavtsev	6	6
(Slovakia) K Čapkovič (Slovakia) P Červenák	1	1
(Czech Republic) J Mertl (Kazakhstan) Y Schukin	6	6
WC	(Russia) M Gilmanov (Russia) D Zagidullin	1	2
4	(Ukraine) I Anikanov (Russia) A Kumantsov	6	5	[13]
(Russia) I Belyaev (Russia) E Donskoy	2	7	[11]
WC	(Russia) S Krotiouk (Russia) A Manegin	7	1	[10]
WC	(Russia) V Gorshenin (Russia) A Yakovlev	5	6	[7]
(Germany) G Kretschmer (Republic of Ireland) C Niland	4	6	[2]
(Germany) T Kamke (Germany) J Reister	6	4	[10]
(Ukraine) S Bubka Jr. (Ukraine) I Sergeyev	7	6
3	(Russia) E Kirillov (Russia) K Kravchuk	6^{6}	2
(Serbia) N Ćirić (Montenegro) G Tošić	6	6^{0}	[10]
(Spain) R Bautista-Agut (Spain) A Menéndez-Maceiras	3	7	[3]
(Poland) M Przysiężny (Russia) D Sitak	2	3
2	(Kazakhstan) A Kedryuk (Russia) D Matsukevich	6	6

Quarterfinals
1	(Russia) M Elgin (Russia) A Kudryavtsev	1	5
(Czech Republic) J Mertl (Kazakhstan) Y Schukin	6	7
4	(Ukraine) I Anikanov (Russia) A Kumantsov	3	5
WC	(Russia) S Krotiouk (Russia) A Manegin	6	7
(Germany) T Kamke (Germany) J Reister	2	6	[10]
(Ukraine) S Bubka Jr. (Ukraine) I Sergeyev	6	1	[7]
(Serbia) N Ćirić (Montenegro) G Tošić	6	6
2	(Kazakhstan) A Kedryuk (Russia) D Matsukevich	4	2

Semifinals
(Czech Republic) J Mertl (Kazakhstan) Y Schukin	6	6
WC	(Russia) S Krotiouk (Russia) A Manegin	2	1
(Germany) T Kamke (Germany) J Reister	0	7	[10]
(Serbia) N Ćirić (Montenegro) G Tošić	6	5	[8]

Final
(Czech Republic) J Mertl (Kazakhstan) Y Schukin	6	6
(Germany) T Kamke (Germany) J Reister	2	4
