= 2016 Kazan Kremlin Cup – Doubles =

Doubles
- 2016 Kazan Kremlin Cup

Final
- Champions: (Belarus) Aliaksandr Bury (Slovakia) Igor Zelenay
- Runners-up: (Russia) Konstantin Kravchuk (Austria) Philipp Oswald
- Score: 6–2, 4–6, [10–6]

Events
| Singles | Doubles |
- Kazan Kremlin Cup

Mikhail Elgin and Igor Zelenay were the defending champions but they returned with different partners.

Elgin played with Egor Gerasimov while Zelenay played with Aliaksandr Bury.

Aliaksandr Bury and Igor Zelenay won the title by defeating Konstantin Kravchuk and Philipp Oswald 6–2, 4–6, [10–6] in the final.

== Seeds ==
1. (Belarus) Aliaksandr Bury / (Slovakia) Igor Zelenay (champions)
2. (Russia) Konstantin Kravchuk / (Austria) Philipp Oswald (final)
3. (Belarus) Yaraslav Shyla / (Belarus) Andrei Vasilevski (quarterfinals)
4. (Italy) Flavio Cipolla / (Italy) Matteo Viola (quarterfinals)

== Draw ==
Key

- Q = Qualifier
- WC = Wild card
- LL = Lucky loser
- Alt = Alternate
- ITF = ITF entry
- PR = Protected ranking
- SR = Special ranking
- SE = Special exempt
- JE = Junior exempt
- JR = Junior Accelerator Programme entrant
- CO = College Accelerator Programme entrant
- NG = Next Gen Accelerator Program entrant
- w/o = Walkover
- r = Retired
- d = Defaulted

=== Draw ===
First round
1 | (Belarus) A Bury (Slovakia) I Zelenay | 6 | 6
WC | (Russia) Pavel Selivanovsky (Russia) Alexander Vasilenko | 1 | 2
WC | (Russia) Alexander Boborykin (Russia) Timor Kiuamov | 7^{7} | 2 | [10]
(France) D Guez (France) A Sidorenko | 6^{5} | 6 | [2]
4 | (Italy) F Cipolla (Italy) M Viola | w/o
(Kazakhstan) A Nedovyesov (Estonia) J Zopp
WC | (Russia) M Kalovelonis (Russia) A Vatutin | 1 | 4
(Belarus) U Ignatik (Russia) D Medvedev | 6 | 6
(France) T Lamasine (France) A Olivetti | 5 | 7 | [4]
(Russia) M Elgin (Belarus) E Gerasimov | 7 | 5 | [10]
(Moldova) R Albot (Uzbekistan) F Dustov | 4 | 4
3 | (Belarus) Y Shyla (Belarus) A Vasilevski | 6 | 6
(Bosnia and Herzegovina) T Brkić (Bosnia and Herzegovina) A Šetkić | 0^{r}
(Serbia) M Janković (Serbia) Ilija Vučić | 1
PR | (Russia) A Karatsev (Russia) D Matsukevich | 3 | 3
2 | (Russia) K Kravchuk (Austria) P Oswald | 6 | 6

Quarterfinals
1 | (Belarus) A Bury (Slovakia) I Zelenay | 6 | 6
WC | (Russia) A Boborykin (Russia) T Kiuamov | 3 | 4
4 | (Italy) F Cipolla (Italy) M Viola | 1 | 1
(Belarus) U Ignatik (Russia) D Medvedev | 6 | 6
(Russia) M Elgin (Belarus) E Gerasimov | 6 | 2 | [10]
3 | (Belarus) Y Shyla (Belarus) A Vasilevski | 3 | 6 | [8]
(Serbia) M Janković (Serbia) I Vučić | 2 | 5
2 | (Russia) K Kravchuk (Austria) P Oswald | 6 | 7

Semifinals
1 | (Belarus) A Bury (Slovakia) I Zelenay | 7^{10} | 6
(Belarus) U Ignatik (Russia) D Medvedev | 6^{8} | 0
(Russia) M Elgin (Belarus) E Gerasimov
2 | (Russia) K Kravchuk (Austria) P Oswald | w/o

Final
1 | (Belarus) A Bury (Slovakia) I Zelenay | 6 | 4 | [10]
2 | (Russia) K Kravchuk (Austria) P Oswald | 2 | 6 | [6]
