= 2013 Kazan Kremlin Cup – Singles =

Singles
- 2013 Kazan Kremlin Cup

Final
- Champion: (Ukraine) Oleksandr Nedovyesov
- Runner-up: (Kazakhstan) Andrey Golubev
- Score: 6–4, 6–1

Events
Singles	Doubles
← 2012 ·	Kazan Kremlin Cup	· 2014 →

Jürgen Zopp was the defending champion but chose not to compete.

In the final, Oleksandr Nedovyesov defeated Andrey Golubev 6–4, 6–1.

== Seeds ==
1. (Russia) Evgeny Donskoy (second round)
2. (Russia) Teymuraz Gabashvili (first round)
3. (Ukraine) Oleksandr Nedovyesov (champion)
4. (Kazakhstan) Andrey Golubev (final)
5. (Italy) Matteo Viola (quarterfinals)
6. (Serbia) Dušan Lajović (quarterfinals)
7. (Germany) Matthias Bachinger (second round)
8. (Moldova) Radu Albot (second round)

== Draw ==
=== Key ===
- Q = Qualifier
- WC = Wild card
- LL = Lucky loser
- Alt = Alternate
- SE = Special exempt
- PR = Protected ranking
- ITF = ITF entry
- JE = Junior exempt
- w/o = Walkover
- r = Retired
- d = Defaulted
- SR = Special ranking

=== Finals ===
Semifinals
(France) Lucas Pouille	2	1
4	(Kazakhstan) Andrey Golubev	6	6
3	(Ukraine) Oleksandr Nedovyesov	7	6
(Uzbekistan) Farrukh Dustov	5	2

Final
4	(Kazakhstan) Andrey Golubev	4	1
(Ukraine) Oleksandr Nedovyesov	6	6

=== Top half ===
First round
1	(Russia) E Donskoy	4	7^{7}	7
(Belarus) U Ignatik	6	6^{2}	5
LL	(Russia) Alexander Rumyantsev	6^{3}	4
(France) L Pouille	7^{7}	6
WC	(Russia) Timur Kiuamov	1	5
WC	(Russia) A Karatsev	6	7
WC	(Turkey) B Ergüden	3	4
8	(Moldova) R Albot	6	6
4	(Kazakhstan) A Golubev	7^{9}	6
Q	(Russia) R Muzaev	6^{7}	4
(Belarus) D Zhyrmont	1	4
Q	(Netherlands) A van der Duim	6	6
(Turkey) M İlhan	6	6^{5}	6
WC	(Russia) A Rublev	4	7^{7}	4
(Germany) D Meffert	6	2	4^{r}
6	(Serbia) D Lajović	1	6	3

Second round
1	(Russia) E Donskoy	4	5
(France) L Pouille	6	7
WC	(Russia) A Karatsev	7^{7}	3	7
8	(Moldova) R Albot	6^{5}	6	5
4	(Kazakhstan) A Golubev	3	6	6
Q	(Netherlands) A van der Duim	6	1	0
(Turkey) M İlhan	2	6	4
6	(Serbia) D Lajović	6	2	6

Quarterfinals
(France) L Pouille	6	6
WC	(Russia) A Karatsev	1	0
4	(Kazakhstan) A Golubev	2	6	7^{8}
6	(Serbia) D Lajović	6	1	6^{6}

Semifinals
(France) L Pouille	2	1
4	(Kazakhstan) A Golubev	6	6

=== Bottom half ===
First round
5	(Italy) M Viola	6	6
(Netherlands) B Westerhof	3	0
(Serbia) B Pašanski	5	6	6
(Spain) A Menéndez-Maceiras	7	4	4
(Belarus) E Gerasimov	6	4	6
(Russia) M Biryukov	3	6	2
(Russia) V Baluda	1	6	2
3	(Ukraine) O Nedovyesov	6	2	6
7	(Germany) M Bachinger	6	6
Q	(Moldova) M Dubarenco	3	2
(Uzbekistan) F Dustov	6	6
(Russia) A Kudryavtsev	3	0
(Netherlands) T Schoorel	6	3	1
(Russia) A Lobkov	2	6	6
(Germany) T Pütz	7	6
2	(Russia) T Gabashvili	5	4

Second round
5	(Italy) M Viola	7^{7}	4
(Serbia) B Pašanski	6^{5}	0^{4}
(Belarus) E Gerasimov	1	6	4
3	(Ukraine) O Nedovyesov	6	3	6
7	(Germany) M Bachinger	3	1
(Uzbekistan) F Dustov	6	6
(Russia) A Lobkov	1	6	6
(Germany) T Pütz	6	3	4

Quarterfinals
5	(Italy) M Viola	4	4
3	(Ukraine) O Nedovyesov	6	6
(Uzbekistan) F Dustov	7^{7}	6
(Russia) A Lobkov	6^{1}	3

Semifinals
3	(Ukraine) O Nedovyesov	7	6
(Uzbekistan) F Dustov	5	2
