= 2013 Kazan Kremlin Cup – Doubles =

Doubles
- 2013 Kazan Kremlin Cup

Final
- Champions: (Moldova) Radu Albot (Uzbekistan) Farrukh Dustov
- Runners-up: (Belarus) Egor Gerasimov (Belarus) Dzmitry Zhyrmont
- Score: 6–2, 6–7^{(3–7)}, [10–7]

Events
Singles	Doubles
← 2012 ·	Kazan Kremlin Cup	· 2014 →

Sanchai Ratiwatana and Sonchat Ratiwatana were the defending champions, but both players chose not to participate.
Radu Albot and Farrukh Dustov won the title defeating Egor Gerasimov and Dzmitry Zhyrmont 6–2, 6–7^{(3–7)}, [10–7].

== Seeds ==
1. (Germany) Dominik Meffert / (Austria) Philipp Oswald (first round, withdrew)
2. (Australia) Rameez Junaid / (Germany) Frank Moser (quarterfinals)
3. (United States) James Cerretani / (Canada) Adil Shamasdin (first round)
4. (Russia) Mikhail Elgin / (Russia) Teymuraz Gabashvili (quarterfinals)

== Draw ==
=== Key ===
- Q = Qualifier
- WC = Wild card
- LL = Lucky loser
- Alt = Alternate
- SE = Special exempt
- PR = Protected ranking
- ITF = ITF entry
- JE = Junior exempt
- w/o = Walkover
- r = Retired
- d = Defaulted
- SR = Special ranking

=== Draw ===
First round
1	(Germany) D Meffert (Austria) P Oswald
(Spain) A Menéndez-Maceiras (Germany) T Pütz	w/o
WC	(Russia) A Rublev (Netherlands) T Schoorel	3	2
(Moldova) M Dubarenco (Belarus) U Ignatik	6	6
4	(Russia) M Elgin (Russia) T Gabashvili	6	2	[10]
(Russia) A Lobkov (Russia) D Matsukevich	1	6	[7]
WC	(Russia) Alexander Boborykin (Russia) Timur Kiuamov	0	7^{9}	[9]
(Belarus) E Gerasimov (Belarus) D Zhyrmont	6	6^{7}	[11]
WC	(Russia) R Muzaev (Russia) Vladimir Polyakov	4	6^{5}
(Moldova) R Albot (Uzbekistan) F Dustov	6	7^{7}
(Netherlands) A van der Duim (Netherlands) B Westerhof	6^{6}	6	[10]
3	(United States) J Cerretani (Canada) A Shamasdin	7^{8}	4	[1]
(Russia) E Donskoy (Russia) Alexander Rumyantsev	0	4
(Kazakhstan) A Golubev (Ukraine) O Nedovyesov	6	6
(Russia) V Baluda (Russia) A Karatsev	6	4	[3]
2	(Australia) R Junaid (Germany) F Moser	2	6	[10]

Quarterfinals
(Spain) A Menéndez-Maceiras (Germany) T Pütz	6	6
(Moldova) M Dubarenco (Belarus) U Ignatik	2	4
4	(Russia) M Elgin (Russia) T Gabashvili	6	3	[7]
(Belarus) E Gerasimov (Belarus) D Zhyrmont	3	6	[10]
(Moldova) R Albot (Uzbekistan) F Dustov	3	6	[10]
(Netherlands) A van der Duim (Netherlands) B Westerhof	6	4	[6]
(Kazakhstan) A Golubev (Ukraine) O Nedovyesov	6	1	[10]
2	(Australia) R Junaid (Germany) F Moser	2	6	[6]

Semifinals
(Spain) A Menéndez-Maceiras (Germany) T Pütz	6^{3}	6	[6]
(Belarus) E Gerasimov (Belarus) D Zhyrmont	7^{7}	3	[10]
(Moldova) R Albot (Uzbekistan) F Dustov	6	6
(Kazakhstan) A Golubev (Ukraine) O Nedovyesov	3	4

Final
(Belarus) E Gerasimov (Belarus) D Zhyrmont	2	7^{7}	[7]
(Moldova) R Albot (Uzbekistan) F Dustov	6	6^{3}	[10]
