= 2012 Kazan Kremlin Cup =

- Date: 30 January – 5 February
- Edition: 3rd
- Location: Kazan, Russia

Champions

Singles
- (Estonia) Jürgen Zopp

Doubles
- (Thailand) Sanchai Ratiwatana / (Thailand) Sonchat Ratiwatana
← 2011 ·	Kazan Kremlin Cup	· 2013 →

The 2012 Kazan Kremlin Cup was a professional tennis tournament played on indoor hard courts. It was the third edition of the tournament which was part of the 2012 ATP Challenger Tour. It took place in Kazan, Russia between 30 January and 5 February 2012.

== Singles main-draw entrants ==
=== Seeds ===
Country	Player	Rank^{1}	Seed
TUN	Malek Jaziri	123	1
AUT	Andreas Haider-Maurer	127	2
ESP	Arnau Brugués Davi	138	3
ESP	Daniel Muñoz de la Nava	139	4
CZE	Jan Hájek	140	5
RUS	Teymuraz Gabashvili	141	6
RUS	Evgeny Donskoy	144	7
EST	Jürgen Zopp	148	8

- Rankings are as of January 24, 2012.

=== Other entrants ===
The following players received wildcards into the singles main draw:

- (Russia) Aydin Akhmetshin
- (Russia) Anton Manegin
- (Russia) Stanislav Vovk
- (Russia) Daniyal Zagidullin

The following players received entry from the qualifying draw:

- (Moldova) Radu Albot
- (Italy) Thomas Fabbiano
- (Russia) Evgeny Kirillov
- (Russia) Mikhail Ledovskikh

The following players received entry as lucky losers:

- (Ukraine) Illya Marchenko
- (Russia) Denis Matsukevich

== Champions ==
=== Singles ===
(Estonia) Jürgen Zopp def. (Romania) Marius Copil, 7–6^{(7–4)}, 7–6^{(7–4)}

=== Doubles ===
(Thailand) Sanchai Ratiwatana / (Thailand) Sonchat Ratiwatana def. (Belarus) Aliaksandr Bury / (Poland) Mateusz Kowalczyk, 6–3, 6–1
