= 2014 Kazan Kremlin Cup =

- Date: 10–16 March
- Edition: 5th
- Location: Kazan, Russia

Champions

Singles
- (Turkey) Marsel İlhan

Doubles
- (Italy) Flavio Cipolla / (Serbia) Goran Tošić
- Kazan Kremlin Cup

The 2014 Kazan Kremlin Cup was a professional tennis tournament played on indoor hard courts. It was the fifth edition of the tournament which was part of the 2014 ATP Challenger Tour. It took place in Kazan, Russia between 10 and 16 March 2014.

== Singles main-draw entrants ==
=== Seeds ===
Country	Player	Rank^{1}	Seed
GER	Michael Berrer	132	1
RUS	Andrey Kuznetsov	149	2
LTU	Ričardas Berankis	151	3
SVK	Norbert Gomboš	166	4
TUR	Marsel İlhan	174	5
UZB	Farrukh Dustov	175	6
SRB	Ilija Bozoljac	178	7
FRA	Albano Olivetti	179	8

- Rankings are as of October 14, 2013.

=== Other entrants ===
The following players received wildcards into the singles main draw:

- (Turkey) Baris Erguden
- (Russia) Timur Kiuamov
- (Russia) Andrey Rublev
- (Russia) Vaja Uzakov

The following players used Protected Ranking to gain entry into the main draw:

- (Ukraine) Sergei Bubka

The following players received entry from the qualifying draw:

- (Germany) Dominik Meffert
- (Russia) Denis Matsukevich
- (Estonia) Jürgen Zopp
- (Luxembourg) Gilles Müller

== Champions ==
=== Singles ===
- (Turkey) Marsel İlhan def. (Germany) Michael Berrer, 7–6^{(8–6)}, 6–3

=== Doubles ===
- (Italy) Flavio Cipolla / (Serbia) Goran Tošić def. (Russia) Victor Baluda / (Russia) Konstantin Kravchuk, 3–6, 7–5, [12–10]
