= 2016 Kazan Kremlin Cup =

- Date: 14–20 March
- Edition: 7th
- Draw: 32S / 16D
- Prize money: $40,000+H
- Surface: Hard (indoor)
- Location: Kazan, Russia

Champions

Singles
- (Germany) Tobias Kamke

Doubles
- (Belarus) Aliaksandr Bury / (Slovakia) Igor Zelenay
- Kazan Kremlin Cup

The 2016 Kazan Kremlin Cup was a professional tennis tournament played on hard courts. It was the seventh edition of the tournament which was part of the 2016 ATP Challenger Tour. It took place in Kazan, Russia between 14 and 20 March 2016.

== Singles main-draw entrants ==
=== Seeds ===
Country	Player	Rank^{1}	Seed
LTU	Ričardas Berankis	85	1
POR	Gastão Elias	121	2
RUS	Konstantin Kravchuk	128	3
MDA	Radu Albot	143	4
RUS	Karen Khachanov	146	5
SVK	Norbert Gombos	162	6
BLR	Egor Gerasimov	172	7
EST	Jürgen Zopp	174	8

- ^{1} Rankings are as of March 7, 2016

=== Other entrants ===
The following players received wildcards into the singles main draw:

- (Russia) Alexander Boborykin
- (Russia) Alexander Bublik
- (Russia) Daniil Medvedev

The following player entered into the singles main draw with a protected ranking:

- (France) Albano Olivetti

The following players received entry from the qualifying draw:

- (Belarus) Ilya Ivashka
- (Russia) Markos Kalovelonis
- (France) Alexandre Sidorenko
- (Belarus) Dzmitry Zhyrmont

The following players entered the singles main draw as lucky losers:

- (Belarus) Maxim Dubarenco
- (Russia) Denis Matsukevich
- (Russia) Alexey Vatutin

== Champions ==
=== Singles ===
- (Germany) Tobias Kamke def. (Russia) Aslan Karatsev, 6–4, 6–2

=== Doubles ===
- (Belarus) Aliaksandr Bury / (Slovakia) Igor Zelenay def. (Russia) Konstantin Kravchuk / (Austria) Philipp Oswald, 6–2, 4–6, [10–6]
