= 2015 Kazan Kremlin Cup =

- Date: 16 – 22 March
- Edition: 6th
- Draw: 32S / 16D
- Prize money: $40,000+H
- Surface: Hard (indoor)
- Location: Kazan, Russia

Champions

Singles
- (Russia) Aslan Karatsev

Doubles
- (Russia) Mikhail Elgin / (Slovakia) Igor Zelenay
- Kazan Kremlin Cup

The 2015 Kazan Kremlin Cup was a professional tennis tournament played on hard courts. It was the sixth edition of the tournament which was part of the 2015 ATP Challenger Tour. It took place in Kazan, Russia between 16 and 22 March 2015.

== Singles main draw entrants ==
=== Seeds ===
Country	Player	Rank^{1}	Seed
TUR	Marsel İlhan	77	1
RUS	Andrey Kuznetsov	82	2
UKR	Illya Marchenko	123	3
POL	Michał Przysiężny	149	4
RUS	Evgeny Donskoy	156	5
EST	Jürgen Zopp	158	6
RUS	Konstantin Kravchuk	185	7
ITA	Andrea Arnaboldi	191	8

- ^{1} Rankings are as of March 9, 2015

=== Other entrants ===
The following players received wildcards into the singles main draw:

- (Russia) Vitaly Kozyukov
- (Russia) Timur Kiuamov
- (Russia) Karen Khachanov
- (Russia) Evgeny Elistratov

The following players received entry from the qualifying draw:

- (Lithuania) Laurynas Grigelis
- (Slovakia) Adrian Sikora
- (Belarus) Sergey Betov
- (Russia) Mikhail Elgin

== Champions ==
=== Singles ===
- (Russia) Aslan Karatsev def. (Russia) Konstantin Kravchuk, 6–4, 4–6, 6–3

=== Doubles ===
- (Russia) Mikhail Elgin / (Slovakia) Igor Zelenay def. (Italy) Andrea Arnaboldi / (Italy) Matteo Viola, 6–3, 6–3
