= 2010 Kazan Kremlin Cup =

- Date: February 1–7, 2010
- Edition: 1st
- Location: Kazan, Russia

Champions

Singles
- (Poland) Michał Przysiężny

Doubles
- (Czech Republic) Jan Mertl / (Kazakhstan) Yuri Schukin
- Kazan Kremlin Cup

The 2010 Kazan Kremlin Cup was a professional tennis tournament played on indoor hard courts. It was part of the 2010 ATP Challenger Tour. It took place in Kazan, Russia, between 1 and 7 February 2010.

== ATP entrants ==
=== Seeds ===
| Country | Player | Rank^{1} | Seed |
|---|---|---|---|
| GER | Julian Reister | 172 | 1 |
| POL | Michał Przysiężny | 192 | 2 |
| KAZ | Yuri Schukin | 205 | 3 |
| RUS | Alexander Kudryavtsev | 206 | 4 |
| UKR | Ivan Sergeyev | 209 | 5 |
| ESP | Adrián Menéndez Maceiras | 222 | 6 |
| RUS | Konstantin Kravchuk | 244 | 7 |
| SVK | Pavol Červenák | 252 | 8 |

- Rankings are as of January 18, 2010

=== Other entrants ===
The following players received wildcards into the singles main draw:

- (Russia) Marat Gilmanov
- (Russia) Vladislav Gorshenin
- (Russia) Anton Manegin
- (Russia) Daniyal Zagidullin

The following players received entry from the qualifying draw:

- (Russia) Evgeny Donskoy
- (Russia) Mikhail Ledovskikh
- (Russia) Alexander Lobkov
- (Russia) Denis Matsukevich

== Champions ==
=== Singles ===
(Poland) Michał Przysiężny def. (Germany) Julian Reister, 7–6(5), 6–4

=== Doubles ===
(Czech Republic) Jan Mertl / (Kazakhstan) Yuri Schukin def. (Germany) Tobias Kamke / (Germany) Julian Reister, 6–2, 6–4.
