= 2013 Kazan Kremlin Cup =

- Date: 21–27 October
- Edition: 4th
- Location: Kazan, Russia

Champions

Singles
- (Ukraine) Oleksandr Nedovyesov

Doubles
- (Moldova) Radu Albot / (Uzbekistan) Farrukh Dustov
- Kazan Kremlin Cup

The 2013 Kazan Kremlin Cup was a professional tennis tournament played on indoor hard courts. It was the fourth edition of the tournament which was part of the 2013 ATP Challenger Tour. It took place in Kazan, Russia between 21 and 27 October 2013.

== Singles main-draw entrants ==
=== Seeds ===
Country	Player	Rank^{1}	Seed
RUS	Evgeny Donskoy	84	1
RUS	Teymuraz Gabashvili	105	2
UKR	Oleksandr Nedovyesov	124	3
KAZ	Andrey Golubev	131	4
ITA	Matteo Viola	132	5
SRB	Dušan Lajović	138	6
GER	Matthias Bachinger	146	7
MDA	Radu Albot	172	8

- Rankings are as of October 14, 2013.

=== Other entrants ===
The following players received wildcards into the singles main draw:

- (Turkey) Barış Ergüden
- (Russia) Aslan Karatsev
- (Russia) Timur Kiuamov
- (Russia) Andrey Rublev

The following players received entry from the qualifying draw:

- (Moldova) Maxim Dubarenco
- (Russia) Richard Muzaev
- (Netherlands) Antal van der Duim
- (Russia) Alexey Vatutin

The following players received entry as a lucky loser:

- (Russia) Alexander Rumyantsev

== Champions ==
=== Singles ===
- (Ukraine) Oleksandr Nedovyesov def. (Kazakhstan) Andrey Golubev 6–4, 6–1

=== Doubles ===
- (Moldova) Radu Albot / (Uzbekistan) Farrukh Dustov def. (Belarus) Egor Gerasimov / (Belarus) Dzmitry Zhyrmont 6–2, 6–7^{(3–7)}, [10–7]
