= Andreas Beck (tennis) =

German tennis player (born 1986)

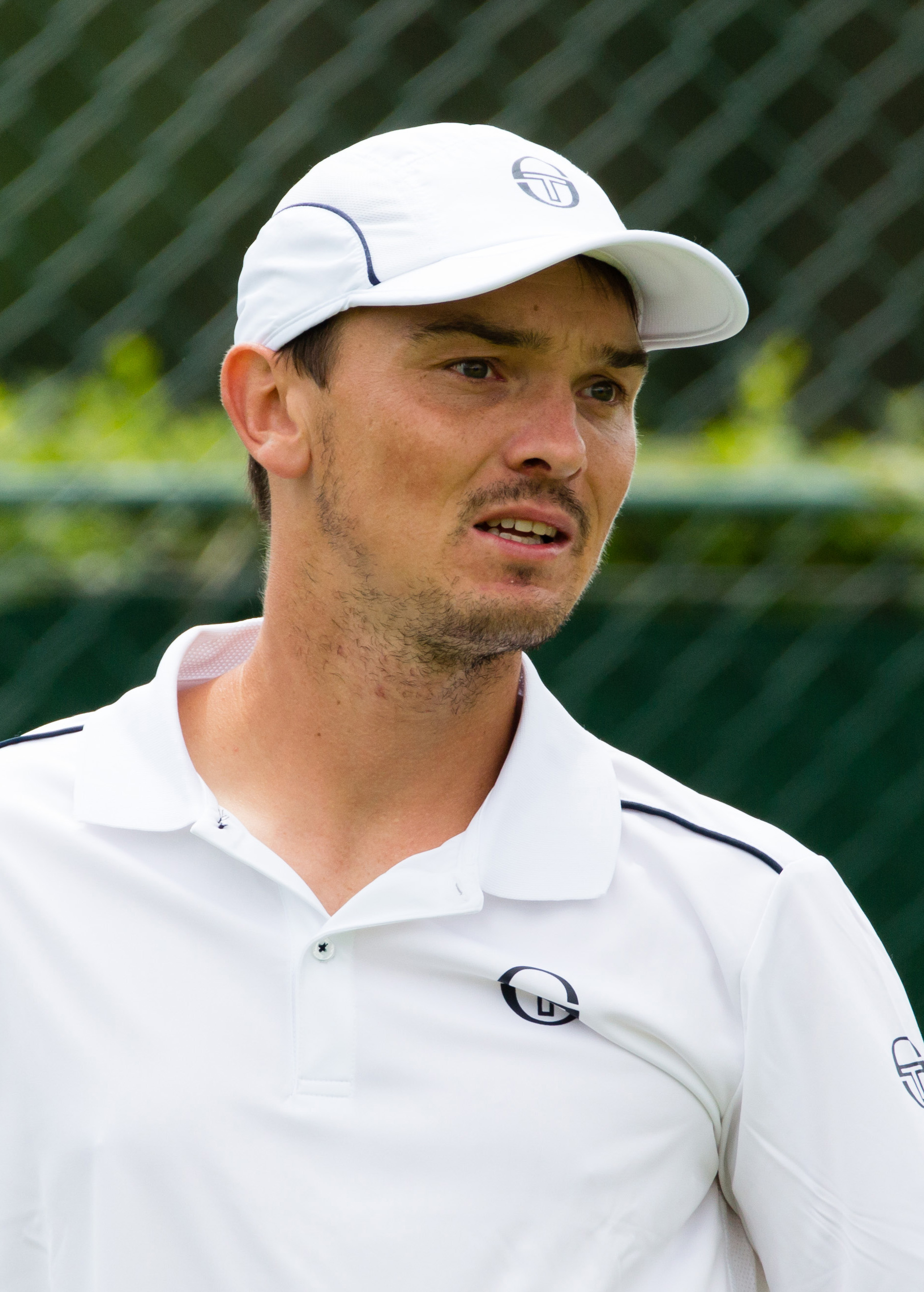
- Country (sports): Germany
- Born: 5 February 1986 (age 40) Weingarten, Germany
- Height: 1.91 m (6 ft 3 in)
- Turned pro: 2003
- Retired: 2016
- Plays: Left-handed (two-handed backhand)
- Prize money: $ 1,564,600

Singles
- Career record: 41–65
- Career titles: 0
- Highest ranking: No. 33 (2 November 2009)

Grand Slam singles results
- Australian Open: 2R (2009, 2012)
- French Open: 2R (2009, 2010)
- Wimbledon: 2R (2010)
- US Open: 2R (2008, 2009, 2010)

Doubles
- Career record: 22–27
- Career titles: 0
- Highest ranking: No. 116 (30 January 2012)

Grand Slam doubles results
- French Open: 2R (2010)
- US Open: 1R (2009)
- Last updated on: 28 August 2021.

Andreas Beck (German pronunciation: [anˈdʁeːas ˈbɛk]; born 5 February 1986) is a German former professional tennis player. He achieved a career-high singles ranking of world No. 33 in November 2009. As a qualifier, Beck reached the quarterfinals of the 2009 Monte Carlo Masters.

== Professional career ==
=== 2008 ===
In June, Beck qualified for the 2008 Wimbledon Championships, beating No. 218 Paolo Lorenzi, No. 194 Brendan Evans, and No. 280 Jaroslav Pospíšil. In his first round match he played World No. 2 Rafael Nadal on Centre Court, losing in straight sets.

=== 2009 ===
In the Monte-Carlo Masters, Beck entered as a qualifier and reached the quarterfinals, defeating sixth seed Gilles Simon and Juan Mónaco along the way. He was defeated by Stanislas Wawrinka in straight sets, the Swiss having beaten countryman and World No. 2 Roger Federer in the previous round. As a result of his performance in this tournament, Beck's ranking climbed 29 places in the ATP rankings to No. 60, while he reached his career-high of World No. 33 later in the year.

Beck reached his first ATP final at the Allianz Suisse Open Gstaad. He was defeated by qualifier Thomaz Bellucci.

== ATP career finals ==
=== Singles: 1 (1 runner-up) ===
| Legend Grand Slam tournaments (0–0) ATP World Tour Finals (0–0) ATP World Tour Masters 1000 (0–0) ATP World Tour 500 Series (0–0) ATP World Tour 250 Series (0–1) | Titles by surface Hard (0–0) Clay (0–1) Grass (0–0) Carpet (0–0) | Titles by setting Outdoor (0–1) Indoor (0–0) |

| Result | W–L | Date | Tournament | Tier | Surface | Opponent | Score |
|---|---|---|---|---|---|---|---|
| Loss | 0–1 | Aug 2009 | Gstaad, Switzerland | 250 Series | Clay | (Brazil) Thomaz Bellucci | 4–6, 6–7^{(2–7)} |

=== Doubles: 2 (2 runner-ups) ===
| Legend Grand Slam tournaments (0–0) ATP World Tour Finals (0–0) ATP World Tour Masters 1000 (0–0) ATP World Tour 500 Series (0–0) ATP World Tour 250 Series (0–2) | Titles by surface Hard (0–0) Clay (0–1) Grass (0–1) Carpet (0–0) | Titles by setting Outdoor (0–2) Indoor (0–0) |

| Result | W–L | Date | Tournament | Tier | Surface | Partner | Opponenta | Score |
| Loss | 0–1 | Jul 2009 | Halle, Germany | 250 Series | Grass | (Switzerland) Marco Chiudinelli | (Germany) Christopher Kas (Germany) Philipp Kohlschreiber | 3–6, 4–6 |
| Loss | 0–2 | May 2011 | Munich, Germany | 250 Series | Clay | (Germany) Christopher Kas | (Argentina) Horacio Zeballos (Italy) Simone Bolelli | 6–7^{(3–7)}, 4–6 |

== ATP Challenger and ITF Futures finals ==
=== Singles: 30 (14–16) ===
| Legend ATP Challenger (5–10) ITF Futures (9–6) | Finals by surface Hard (6–6) Clay (6–7) Grass (0–0) Carpet (2–3) |

| Result | W–L | Date | Tournament | Tier | Surface | Opponent | Score |
|---|---|---|---|---|---|---|---|
| Loss | 0–1 | May 2004 | Germany F6, Neheim-Husten | Futures | Clay | (Latvia) Andis Juška | 4–6, 1–6 |
| Win | 1–1 | Aug 2004 | Netherlands F4, Alphen aan den Rijn | Futures | Clay | (Belgium) Stefan Wauters | 7–6^{(7–1)}, 6–2 |
| Loss | 1–2 | Jan 2005 | Germany F3, Oberhaching | Futures | Hard | (Czech Republic) Robin Vik | 6–7^{(3–7)}, 6–4, 1–6 |
| Win | 2–2 | Jul 2005 | Germany F6, Trier | Futures | Clay | (France) Trystan Meniane | 6–1, 6–2 |
| Win | 3–2 | Jan 2006 | Germany F1, Nussloch | Futures | Carpet | (Germany) Tobias Summerer | 7–6^{(8–6)}, 7–6^{(7–5)} |
| Loss | 3–3 | Jan 2006 | Germany F3, Oberhaching | Futures | Hard | (Germany) Tobias Summerer | 4–6, 3–6 |
| Win | 4–3 | Mar 2006 | Sarajevo, Bosnia & Herzegovina | Challenger | Hard | (Sweden) Andreas Vinciguerra | 2–6, 7–6^{(7–1)}, 7–6^{(8–6)} |
| Win | 5–3 | Apr 2007 | Great Britain F8, Bath | Futures | Hard | (France) Thomas Oger | 7–5, 6–4 |
| Win | 6–3 | Jul 2007 | Germany F7, Trier | Futures | Clay | (Czech Republic) Ladislav Chramosta | 6–2, 6–4 |
| Win | 7–3 | Aug 2007 | Austria F7, Altenstadt | Futures | Clay | (Croatia) Antonio Veić | 6–4, 6–4 |
| Win | 8–3 | Aug 2007 | Germany F14, Wahlstedt | Futures | Clay | (Germany) Julian Reister | 5–7, 6–2, 6–2 |
| Loss | 8–4 | Nov 2007 | Aachen, Germany | Challenger | Carpet | (Russia) Evgeny Korolev | 4–6, 4–6 |
| Loss | 8–5 | Feb 2008 | Germany F4, Mettmann | Futures | Carpet | (Germany) Simon Greul | 2–6, 6–3, 2–6 |
| Win | 9–5 | Mar 2008 | Sarajevo, Bosnia & Herzegovina | Challenger | Hard | (Austria) Alexander Peya | 6–3, 7–6^{(10–8)} |
| Win | 10–5 | May 2008 | Dresden, Germany | Challenger | Clay | (South Korea) Jun Woong-sun | 2–6, 6–3, 7–5 |
| Loss | 10–6 | Sep 2008 | Düsseldorf, Germany | Challenger | Clay | (Belgium) Kristof Vliegen | 0–6, 3–6 |
| Loss | 10–7 | Nov 2008 | Jersey, United Kingdom | Challenger | Hard | (France) Adrian Mannarino | 6–7^{(4–7)}, 6–7^{(4–7)} |
| Loss | 10–8 | Mar 2009 | Besançon, France | Challenger | Hard | (Belgium) Kristof Vliegen | 2–6, 7–6^{(10–8)}, 3–6 |
| Win | 11–8 | Mar 2009 | Khorat, Thailand | Challenger | Hard | (Sweden) Filip Prpic | 7–5, 6–3 |
| Loss | 11–9 | Feb 2011 | Kazan, Russia | Challenger | Hard | (Romania) Marius Copil | 4–6, 4–6 |
| Loss | 11–10 | Mar 2011 | Bath, United Kingdom | Challenger | Hard | (Russia) Dmitry Tursunov | 4–6, 4–6 |
| Loss | 11–11 | Jul 2011 | Oberstaufen, Germany | Challenger | Clay | (Germany) Daniel Brands | 4–6, 6–7^{(3–7)} |
| Loss | 11–12 | Sep 2011 | Como, Italy | Challenger | Clay | (Spain) Pablo Carreño Busta | 4–6, 6–7^{(4–7)} |
| Win | 12–12 | Mar 2014 | Switzerland F2, Trimbach | Futures | Carpet | (France) Albano Olivetti | 7–6^{(7–5)}, 6–4 |
| Win | 13–12 | Apr 2014 | Saint Brieuc, France | Challenger | Hard | (France) Grégoire Burquier | 7–5, 6–3 |
| Loss | 13–13 | May 2014 | Aix En Provence, France | Challenger | Clay | (Argentina) Diego Schwartzman | 7–6^{(7–4)}, 3–6, 2–6 |
| Loss | 13–14 | Jul 2014 | Scheveningen, Netherlands | Challenger | Clay | (Belgium) David Goffin | 3–6, 2–6 |
| Loss | 13–15 | Jan 2016 | Germany F1, Schwieberdingen | Futures | Carpet | (Germany) Daniel Masur | 6–7^{(10–12)}, 7–6^{(13–11)}, 6–7^{(5–7)} |
| Win | 14–15 | Mar 2016 | France F6, Poitiers | Futures | Hard | (Belgium) Maxime Authom | 7–6^{(10–8)}, 6–4 |
| Loss | 14–16 | May 2016 | France F9, Grasse | Futures | Clay | (Germany) Maxime Janvier | 6–4, 5–7, 6–7^{(6–8)} |

=== Doubles: 15 (8–7) ===
| Legend ATP Challenger (4–6) ITF Futures (4–1) | Finals by surface Hard (3–3) Clay (5–3) Grass (0–0) Carpet (0–1) |

| Result | W–L | Date | Tournament | Tier | Surface | Partner | Opponents | Score |
|---|---|---|---|---|---|---|---|---|
| Win | 1–0 | Aug 2003 | Croatia F3, Našice | Futures | Clay | (France) Josselin Ouanna | (Croatia) Ivan Cerović (Croatia) Albert Loncaric | 6–4, 7–5 |
| Loss | 1–1 | Apr 2004 | Germany F4, Riemerling | Futures | Clay | (Germany) Torsten Popp | (Netherlands) Edwin Kempes (Netherlands) Melvyn op der Heijde | 5–7, 4–6 |
| Win | 2–1 | Jul 2007 | Germany F7, Trier | Futures | Clay | (Germany) Marcel Zimmermann | (Germany) Benjamin Ebrahimzadeh (Germany) Philipp Petzschner | walkover |
| Loss | 2–2 | Aug 2008 | Bronx, United States | Challenger | Hard | (Austria) Martin Fischer | (Czech Republic) Lukáš Dlouhý (Czech Republic) Tomáš Zíb | 6–3, 4–6, [9–11] |
| Win | 3–2 | Feb 2011 | Kazan, Russia | Challenger | Hard | (Switzerland) Yves Allegro | (Russia) Mikhail Elgin (Russia) Alexander Kudryavtsev | 6–4, 6–4 |
| Loss | 3–3 | Mar 2011 | Sarajevo, Bosnia & Herzegovina | Challenger | Hard | (Switzerland) Yves Allegro | (United Kingdom) Jamie Delgado (United Kingdom) Jonathan Marray | 6–7^{(4–7)}, 2–6 |
| Loss | 3–4 | Mar 2011 | Bath, United Kingdom | Challenger | Hard | (Switzerland) Yves Allegro | (United Kingdom) Jamie Delgado (United Kingdom) Jonathan Marray | 3–6, 4–6 |
| Win | 4–4 | Apr 2013 | Mersin, Turkey | Challenger | Clay | (Germany) Dominik Meffert | (Moldova) Radu Albot (Ukraine) Oleksandr Nedovyesov | 5–7, 6–3, [10–8] |
| Win | 5–4 | Apr 2013 | Rome, Italy | Challenger | Clay | (Austria) Martin Fischer | (Germany) Martin Emmrich (Australia) Rameez Junaid | 7–6^{(7–2)}, 6–0 |
| Loss | 5–5 | May 2014 | Aix En Provence, France | Challenger | Clay | (Austria) Martin Fischer | (Argentina) Diego Schwartzman (Argentina) Horacio Zeballos | 4–6, 6–3, [5–10] |
| Loss | 5–6 | Nov 2014 | Eckental, Germany | Challenger | Carpet | (Germany) Philipp Petzschner | (Belgium) Ruben Bemelmans (Belgium) Niels Desein | 3–6, 6–4, [8–10] |
| Win | 6–6 | Mar 2015 | Cherbourg, France | Challenger | Hard | (Czech Republic) Jan Mertl | (Australia) Rameez Junaid (Canada) Adil Shamasdin | 6–2, 3–6, [10–3] |
| Loss | 6–7 | Jul 2015 | Todi, Italy | Challenger | Clay | (Germany) Peter Gojowczyk | (Italy) Flavio Cipolla (Argentina) Máximo González | 4–6, 1–6 |
| Win | 7–7 | May 2016 | France F9, Grasse | Futures | Clay | (Belgium) Maxime Authom | (Spain) Marc Fornell Mestres (Portugal) Gonçalo Oliveira | 6–4, 6–3 |
| Win | 8–7 | Sep 2016 | France F18, Mulhouse | Futures | Hard | (France) Grégoire Jacq | (Belgium) Maxime Authom (France) Hugo Nys | 6–4, 6–3 |

== Junior Grand Slam finals ==
=== Doubles: 1 (1 runner-up) ===
| Result | Year | Championship | Surface | Partner | Opponents | Score |
|---|---|---|---|---|---|---|
| Loss | 2004 | US Open | Hard | (Germany) Sebastian Rieschick | (United States) Brendan Evans (United States) Scott Oudsema | 6–4, 1–6, 2–6 |

== Performance timeline ==
Key
| W | F | SF | QF | #R | RR | Q# | DNQ | A | NH |

(W) winner; (F) finalist; (SF) semifinalist; (QF) quarterfinalist; (#R) rounds 4, 3, 2, 1; (RR) round-robin stage; (Q#) qualification round; (DNQ) did not qualify; (A) absent; (NH) not held; (SR) strike rate (events won / competed); (W–L) win–loss record.
To avoid confusion and double counting, these charts are updated at the conclusion of a tournament or when the player's participation has ended.

=== Singles ===
| Tournament | 2006 | 2007 | 2008 | 2009 | 2010 | 2011 | 2012 | 2013 | 2014 | 2015 | SR | W–L | Win % |
|---|---|---|---|---|---|---|---|---|---|---|---|---|---|
Grand Slam tournaments
| Australian Open | A | A | A | 2R | A | A | 2R | A | Q1 | Q3 | 0 / 2 | 2–2 | 50% |
| French Open | Q3 | A | Q1 | 2R | 2R | 1R | A | 1R | 1R | Q1 | 0 / 5 | 2–5 | 29% |
| Wimbledon | Q1 | A | 1R | 1R | 2R | 1R | A | A | Q2 | Q3 | 0 / 4 | 1–4 | 20% |
| US Open | Q1 | A | 2R | 2R | 2R | Q2 | A | Q1 | Q2 | Q1 | 0 / 3 | 3–3 | 50% |
| Win–loss | 0–0 | 0–0 | 1–2 | 3–4 | 3–3 | 0–2 | 1–1 | 0–1 | 0–1 | 0–0 | 0 / 14 | 8–14 | 36% |
ATP World Tour Masters 1000
| Indian Wells | A | A | A | A | 1R | A | A | A | A | A | 0 / 1 | 0–1 | 0% |
| Miami | A | A | A | A | 1R | A | A | A | A | Q1 | 0 / 1 | 0–1 | 0% |
| Monte Carlo | A | A | A | QF | 1R | A | A | A | A | A | 0 / 2 | 3–2 | 60% |
| Rome | A | A | A | Q2 | 1R | A | A | A | A | A | 0 / 1 | 0–1 | 0% |
| Cincinnati | A | A | A | A | Q1 | A | A | A | A | A | 0 / 0 | 0–0 | – |
| Shanghai | A | A | A | 2R | A | A | A | A | A | A | 0 / 1 | 1–1 | 50% |
| Paris | A | A | A | 1R | A | A | A | A | A | A | 0 / 1 | 0–1 | 0% |
| Win–loss | 0–0 | 0–0 | 0–0 | 4–3 | 0–4 | 0–0 | 0–0 | 0–0 | 0–0 | 0–0 | 0 / 7 | 4–7 | 36% |

^{a} 2012 Australian Open counts as 1 win, 0 loss. (Round 2 Roger Federer walkover after Beck withdrew because of lower back injury does not count as a Beck loss, nor a Federer win.)
