= Dzmitry Zhyrmont =

Belarusian tennis player and coach

Dzmitry Zhyrmont Дмитрий Жирмонт
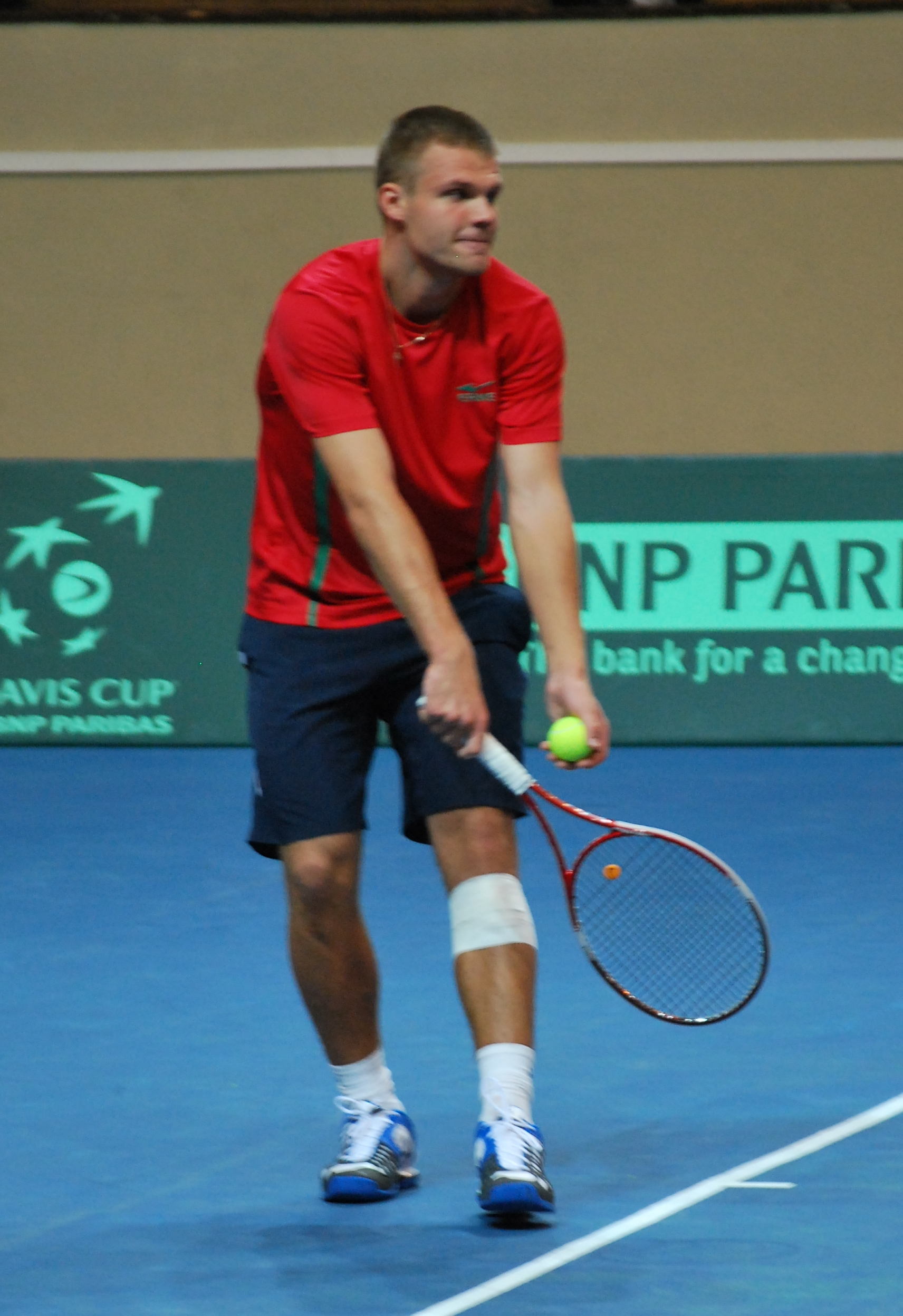
- Zhyrmont at the 2012 Davis Cup
- Full name: Dzmitry Zhyrmont
- Country (sports): Belarus
- Residence: Minsk, Belarus
- Born: 1 March 1989 (age 36); Minsk, Belarusian SSR, Soviet Union
- Height: 1.90 m (6 ft 3 in)
- Plays: Right-handed (two handed-backhand)
- Coach: Belarus tennis center
- Prize money: $201,327

Singles
- Career record: 6–10 (at ATP Tour level, Grand Slam level, and in Davis Cup)
- Career titles: 0
- Highest ranking: No. 201 (22 July 2013)

Grand Slam singles results
- Wimbledon: Q3 (2013)
- US Open: Q1 (2013, 2015)

Doubles
- Career record: 0-0
- Career titles: 0
- Highest ranking: No. 281 (11 November 2013)
- Last updated on: 28 May 2022.

Dzmitry Vasilyevich Zhyrmont (Belarusian: Дзмі́трый Васі́льевіч Жырмо́нт; Дми́трий Васи́льевич Жирмо́нт [ʐɨrˈmont]; born 1 March 1989, in Minsk) is a Belarusian tennis player and tennis coach.

Zhyrmont has a career high ATP singles ranking of 201 achieved on 22 July 2013. He also has a career high ATP doubles ranking of 281 achieved on 11 November 2013.

Zhyrmont has represented Belarus at the Davis Cup where he has a W/L record of 3–6.

At the 2013 Wimbledon Championships, Zhyrmont contested the qualifying event where he reached the last round of qualifying defeating Radu Albot and Paul Capdeville in the previous rounds. In the final round, he faced Stéphane Robert, where he lost 4–6, 6–1, 6–3, 4–6, 4–6.

== ATP Challenger and ITF Futures finals ==
=== Singles: 27 (14–13) ===
Legend ATP Challenger (0–1) ITF Futures (14–12)	Finals by surface Hard (13–12) Clay (0–1) Grass (0–0) Carpet (1–0)

Result	W–L	Date	Tournament	Tier	Surface	Opponent	Score
Loss	0–1	Aug 2008	Belarus F3, Pinsk	Futures	Clay	(Czech Republic) Jan Mertl	4–6, 2–6
Loss	0–2	Nov 2011	Kazakhstan F7, Almaty	Futures	Hard	(Switzerland) Adrien Bossel	2–6, 6–7^{(6–8)}
Loss	0–3	Dec 2011	Kazakhstan F8, Astana	Futures	Hard	(Switzerland) Adrien Bossel	6–7^{(3–7)}, 2–6
Win	1–3	Jul 2012	Kazakhstan F7, Astana	Futures	Hard	(Chinese Taipei) Ti Chen	6–1, 6–4
Loss	1–4	Aug 2012	Karshi, Uzbekistan	Challenger	Hard	(Russia) Igor Kunitsyn	6–7^{(10–12)}, 2–6
Win	2–4	Apr 2013	Uzbekistan F2, Andijan	Futures	Hard	(Slovakia) Marek Semjan	6–3, 7–6^{(8–6)}
Win	3–4	Jul 2013	Turkey F26, Kayseri	Futures	Hard	(Australia) David Sofaer	6–3, 6–1
Loss	3–5	Apr 2014	China F5, Chengdu	Futures	Hard	(China) Ze Zhang	6–3, 3–6, 2–6
Win	4–5	Aug 2014	Belarus F1, Minsk	Futures	Hard	(Australia) Dane Propoggia	7–6^{(7–4)}, 1–6, 6–0
Win	5–5	Aug 2014	Belarus F2, Minsk	Futures	Hard	(Australia) Dane Propoggia	6–1, 6–4
Win	6–5	Oct 2014	Belarus F3, Minsk	Futures	Hard	(Moldova) Maxim Dubarenco	6–2, 3–6, 7–6^{(7–5)}
Win	7–5	Nov 2014	Estonia F3, Tartu	Futures	Carpet	(Russia) Andrey Rublev	6–4, 6–2
Loss	7–6	Feb 2015	Kazakhstan F2, Astana	Futures	Hard	(Russia) Mikhail Elgin	6–3, 4–6, 6–7^{(5–7)}
Loss	7–7	Apr 2015	Uzbekistan F1, Qarshi	Futures	Hard	(India) Yuki Bhambri	2–6, 4–6
Loss	7–8	Apr 2015	Uzbekistan F2, Bukhara	Futures	Hard	(Russia) Karen Khachanov	5–7, 6–4, 3–6
Win	8–8	Oct 2015	Belarus F3, Minsk	Futures	Hard	(United States) Stefan Kozlov	6–1, 6–4
Loss	8–9	Oct 2015	Belarus F4, Minsk	Futures	Hard	(United States) Stefan Kozlov	1–6, 6–7^{(1–7)}
Win	9–9	Nov 2015	Estonia F3, Tallinn	Futures	Hard	(Belgium) Clement Geens	4–6, 6–4, 6–0
Loss	9–10	Aug 2016	Belarus F1, Minsk	Futures	Hard	(Belarus) Yaraslav Shyla	4–6, 1–6
Loss	9–11	Aug 2016	Belarus F2, Minsk	Futures	Hard	(Belarus) Yaraslav Shyla	4–6, 5–7
Win	10–11	Aug 2016	Belarus F3, Minsk	Futures	Hard	(Turkey) Anil Yuksel	6–4, 6–2
Win	11–11	Oct 2016	Sweden F4, Stockholm	Futures	Hard	(United Kingdom) Edward Corrie	7–6^{(7–5)}, 6–1
Win	12–11	Jun 2017	Uzbekistan F4, Namangan	Futures	Hard	(Russia) Mikhail Fufygin	7–6^{(8–6)}, 6–3
Loss	12–12	Aug 2017	Belarus F2, Minsk	Futures	Hard	(Turkey) Marsel İlhan	3–6, 3–6
Win	13–12	Aug 2017	Belarus F3, Minsk	Futures	Hard	(France) Hugo Grenier	7–6^{(7–4)}, 6–2
Loss	13–13	Oct 2017	Sweden F3, Jönköping	Futures	Hard	(Netherlands) Tallon Griekspoor	6–7^{(5–7)}, 4–6
Win	14–13	Mar 2018	Russia F2, Almetievsk	Futures	Hard	(Russia) Evgenii Tiurnev	6–1, 3–0 ret.

=== Doubles: 24 (14–10) ===
Legend ATP Challenger (0–1) ITF Futures (14–9)	Finals by surface Hard (10–5) Clay (2–5) Grass (0–0) Carpet (2–0)

Result	W–L	Date	Tournament	Tier	Surface	Partner	Opponents	Score
Win	1–0	Aug 2008	Belarus F3, Pinsk	Futures	Clay	(Belarus) Sergey Betov	(Ukraine) Vladyslav Klymenko (Latvia) Deniss Pavlovs	6–3, 5–7, [10–6]
Loss	1–1	Feb 2009	Israel F3, Eilat	Futures	Hard	(Belarus) Sergey Betov	(Israel) Idan Mark (Israel) Saar Steele	6–7^{(5–7)}, 6–7^{(4–7)}
Win	2–1	Apr 2009	Uzbekistan F1, Andijan	Futures	Hard	(Russia) Andrei Karatchenia	(Ukraine) Ivan Anikanov (Uzbekistan) Murad Inoyatov	6–7^{(3–7)}, 6–4, [10–4]
Loss	2–2	Aug 2009	Lithuania F1, Vilnius	Futures	Clay	(Belarus) Sergey Betov	(France) Grégoire Burquier (France) Thomas Cazes-Carrère	3–6, 4–6
Win	3–2	Nov 2009	Malaysia F4, Kuala Lumpur	Futures	Hard	(Belarus) Sergey Betov	(Thailand) Kirati Siributwong (United States) Nathan Thompson	6–2, 7–6^{(7–2)}
Win	4–2	Nov 2009	Malaysia F5, Kuala Lumpur	Futures	Hard	(Belarus) Sergey Betov	(India) Rohan Gajjar (Republic of Ireland) Colin O'Brien	6–4, 6–3
Loss	4–3	Dec 2009	Malaysia F6, Kuala Lumpur	Futures	Hard	(Belarus) Sergey Betov	(Netherlands) Jesse Huta Galung (Netherlands) Miliaan Niesten	2–6, 6–4, [6–10]
Loss	4–4	Sep 2010	Russia F8, Vsevolozhsk	Futures	Clay	(Belarus) Nikolai Fidirko	(Russia) Ervand Gasparyan (Russia) Vadim Kutsenko	4–6, 2–6
Win	5–4	Oct 2010	Belarus F3, Minsk	Futures	Hard	(Belarus) Sergey Betov	(Belarus) Aliaksandr Bury (Belarus) Nikolai Fidirko	7–6^{(7–2)}, 3–6, [10–7]
Win	6–4	Oct 2010	Belarus F4, Minsk	Futures	Hard	(Belarus) Sergey Betov	(Belarus) Vitali Reshetnikov (Belarus) Andrei Vasilevski	6–2, 6–3
Loss	6–5	Jul 2011	Estonia F1, Tallinn	Futures	Clay	(Belarus) Pavel Filin	(Belarus) Aliaksandr Bury (Belarus) Andrei Vasilevski	6–4, 6–7^{(5–7)}, [6–10]
Loss	6–6	Jun 2012	Poland F2, Koszalin	Futures	Clay	(Belarus) Egor Gerasimov	(Chile) Guillermo Hormazábal (Poland) Grzegorz Panfil	2–6, 7–6^{(7–4)}, [5–10]
Loss	6–7	Apr 2013	Uzbekistan F1, Namangan	Futures	Hard	(Belarus) Sergey Betov	(Chinese Taipei) Ti Chen (Slovakia) Marek Semjan	2–6, 6–7^{(3–7)}
Win	7–7	Apr 2013	Uzbekistan F2, Andijan	Futures	Hard	(Belarus) Sergey Betov	(Belarus) Aliaksandr Bury (Russia) Mikhail Fufygin	6–2, 7–6^{(7–3)}
Loss	7–8	Oct 2013	Kazan, Russia	Challenger	Hard	(Belarus) Egor Gerasimov	(Moldova) Radu Albot (Uzbekistan) Farrukh Dustov	2–6, 7–6^{(7–3)}, [7–10]
Win	8–8	Mar 2014	Croatia F5, Umag	Futures	Clay	(Belarus) Egor Gerasimov	(Croatia) Dino Marcan (Croatia) Antonio Šančić	6–4, 4–6, [10–6]
Win	9–8	Oct 2015	Belarus F3, Minsk	Futures	Hard	(Belarus) Andrei Vasilevski	(Ukraine) Danylo Kalenichenko (Slovakia) Adrian Sikora	6–2, 6–4
Win	10–8	Oct 2015	Belarus F4, Minsk	Futures	Hard	(Belarus) Andrei Vasilevski	(Belarus) Maxim Dubarenco (Belarus) Evgenii Tiurnev	6–3, 6–3
Win	11–8	Nov 2015	Estonia F2, Tartu	Futures	Carpet	(Latvia) Miķelis Lībietis	(Slovakia) Filip Horansky (Czech Republic) Petr Michnev	7–6^{(7–2)}, 3–6, [10–4]
Win	12–8	Aug 2016	Belarus F1, Minsk	Futures	Hard	(Belarus) Yaraslav Shyla	(Belarus) Markos Kalovelonis (Bulgaria) Vasko Mladenov	7–6^{(10–8)}, 6–3
Win	13–8	Aug 2016	Belarus F2, Minsk	Futures	Hard	(Belarus) Yaraslav Shyla	(United Kingdom) Scott Clayton (United Kingdom) Jonny O'mara	7–5, 7–6^{(7–1)}
Win	14–8	Oct 2016	Estonia F2, Tartu	Futures	Carpet	(Belarus) Aleksandr Vasilenko	(Estonia) Vladimir Ivanov (Estonia) Kenneth Raisma	7–5, 6–2
Loss	14–9	Mar 2017	Greece F3, Heraklion	Futures	Hard	(Belarus) Yaraslav Shyla	(Chile) Marcelo Tomas Barrios Vera (France) Benjamin Bonzi	6–4, 6–7^{(5–7)}, [7–10]
Loss	14–10	Apr 2018	Kazakhstan F3, Shymkent	Futures	Clay	(Kazakhstan) Timur Khabibulin	(South Korea) Seol Jae-Min (South Korea) Song Minkyu	5–7, 3–6
