= Goran Tošić =

Tennis coach and player

- Country (sports): Yugoslavia (1998–2003) / Serbia and Montenegro (2003–2006); Montenegro (2007–2013); Serbia (2013–2014)
- Residence: Podgorica, Montenegro
- Born: 7 October 1982 (age 43) Pančevo, SR Serbia, SFR Yugoslavia
- Turned pro: 1998
- Retired: 2014
- Plays: Right-handed (two-handed backhand)
- Coach: Aleksandar Bolić
- Prize money: US$ 143,659

Singles
- Career record: 1–3
- Career titles: 8 Futures
- Highest ranking: No. 263 (7 June 2010)

Grand Slam singles results
- Australian Open: Q2 (2010)

Doubles
- Career record: 1–3
- Career titles: 7 Challengers, 27 Futures
- Highest ranking: No. 116 (14 April 2014)

Team competitions
- Davis Cup: 17–10 (singles 12–7)

Goran Tošić (Note: Serbian Cyrillic: Горан Тошић, pronounced [ɡǒran tôʃitɕ, - tǒː-]) (born 7 October 1982) is a tennis coach and a former professional player, who represented FR Yugoslavia, Serbia and Montenegro, Montenegro, and later Serbia.

== Coaching career ==
He is currently the coach of Wang Xinyu. He was the coach of Zheng Saisai until 2025.

== ATP Challenger & ITF Futures ==
=== Singles titles (8) ===
Legend
ITF Futures Series (8)

No.	Date	Tournament	Surface	Opponent	Score
1.	2007	Serbia F1, Serbia	Clay	(Serbia) Darko Mađarovski	6–1, 6–3
2.	2009	Serbia F2, Serbia	Clay	(Serbia) Aleksander Slović	6–1, 6–3
3.	2009	Serbia F3, Serbia	Clay	(Bosnia and Herzegovina) Aldin Šetkić	1–6, 6–3, 7–5
4.	2009	Italy F22, Italy	Clay	(Italy) Daniele Giorgini	6–1, 4–6, 7–6^{(7–4)}
5.	2009	Italy F32, Italy	Clay	(Italy) Matteo Viola	6–0, 7–6^{(7–3)}
6.	2010	Brčko F5, Bosnia & Herzegovina	Clay	(Austria) Michael Linzer	7–5, 6–3
7.	2011	Kikinda F4, Serbia	Clay	(France) Gleb Sakharov	6–3, 6–1
8.	2011	Sombor F5, Serbia	Clay	(Serbia) Vladimir Obradović	6–3, 6–2
