= Kazan Kremlin Cup =

- 2016 Kazan Kremlin Cup

Defunct tennis tournament
- Event name: Kazan
- Location: Kazan, Russia
- Venue: Kazan Tennis Academy
- Surface: Hard (indoor)
- Website: Official website
ATP Tour
- Category: ATP Challenger Tour
- Draw: 32S / 32Q / 16D
- Prize money: $40,000+H

The Kazan Kremlin Cup is a professional tennis tournament played on indoor hard courts. The event is part of the ATP Challenger Tour.

== Past finals ==
=== Men's singles ===
Year	Champion	Runner-up	Score
2016	(Germany) Tobias Kamke	(Russia) Aslan Karatsev	6–4, 6–2
2015	(Russia) Aslan Karatsev	(Russia) Konstantin Kravchuk	6–4, 4–6, 6–3
2014	(Turkey) Marsel İlhan	(Germany) Michael Berrer	7–6^{(8–6)}, 6–3
2013	(Ukraine) Oleksandr Nedovyesov	(Kazakhstan) Andrey Golubev	6–4, 6–1
2012	(Estonia) Jürgen Zopp	(Romania) Marius Copil	7–6^{(7–4)}, 7–6^{(7–4)}
2011	(Romania) Marius Copil	(Germany) Andreas Beck	6–4, 6–4
2010	(Poland) Michał Przysiężny	(Germany) Julian Reister	7–6^{(7–5)}, 6–4

=== Men's doubles ===
Year	Champions	Runners-up	Score
2016	(Belarus) Aliaksandr Bury (Slovakia) Igor Zelenay	(Russia) Konstantin Kravchuk (Austria) Philipp Oswald	6–2, 4–6, [10–6]
2015	(Russia) Mikhail Elgin (Slovakia) Igor Zelenay	(Italy) Andrea Arnaboldi (Italy) Matteo Viola	6–3, 6–3
2014	(Italy) Flavio Cipolla (Serbia) Goran Tošić	(Russia) Victor Baluda (Russia) Konstantin Kravchuk	3–6, 7–5, [12–10]
2013	(Moldova) Radu Albot (Uzbekistan) Farrukh Dustov	(Belarus) Egor Gerasimov (Belarus) Dzmitry Zhyrmont	6–2, 6–7^{(3–7)}, [10–7]
2012	(Thailand) Sanchai Ratiwatana (Thailand) Sonchat Ratiwatana	(Belarus) Aliaksandr Bury (Poland) Mateusz Kowalczyk	6–3, 6–1
2011	(Switzerland) Yves Allegro (Germany) Andreas Beck	(Russia) Mikhail Elgin (Russia) Alexander Kudryavtsev	6–4, 6–4
2010	(Czech Republic) Jan Mertl (Kazakhstan) Yuri Schukin	(Germany) Tobias Kamke (Germany) Julian Reister	6–2, 6–4.
