= Konstantin Kravchuk =

Russian tennis player

Konstantin Kravchuk Константин Кравчук
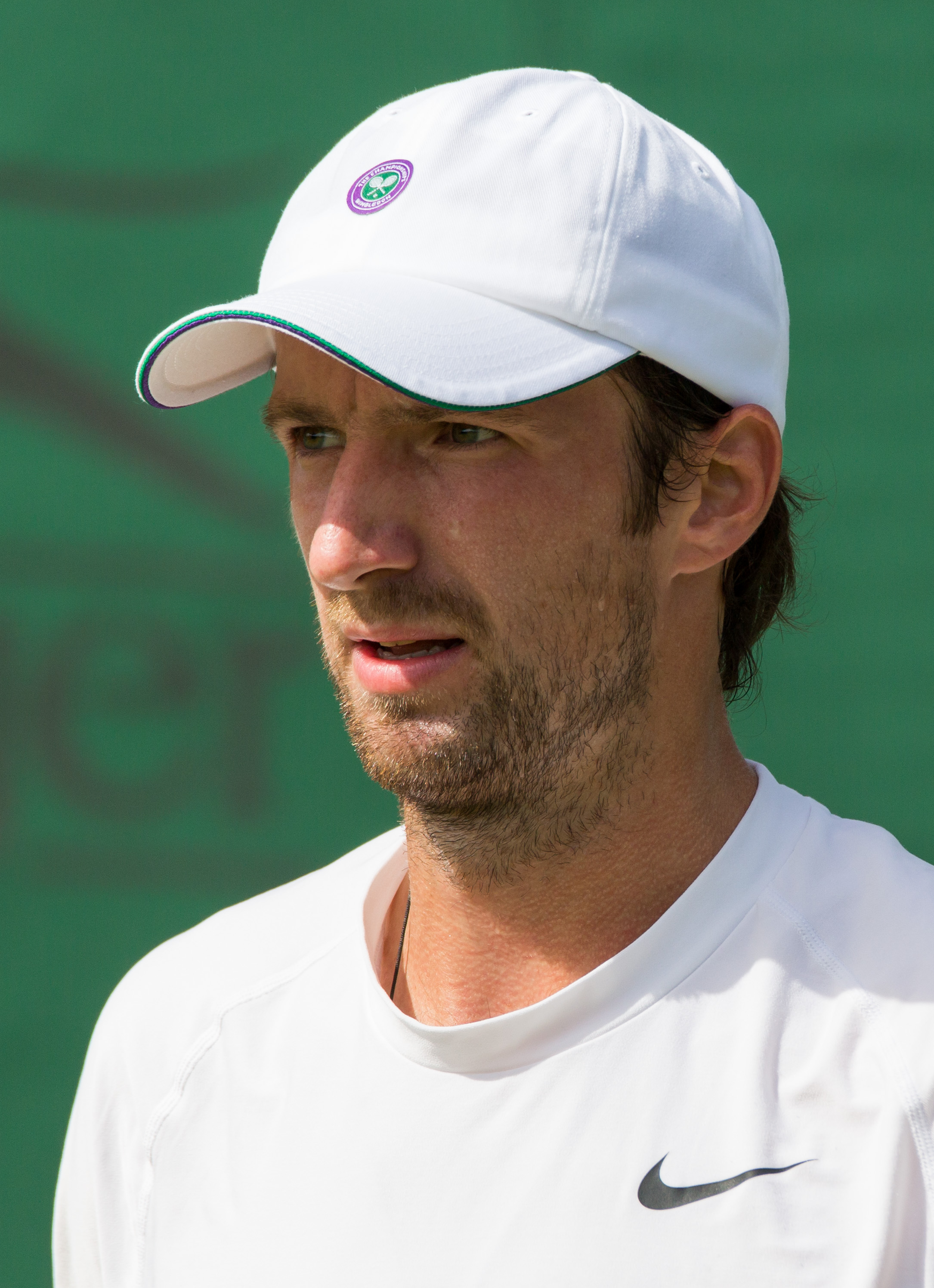
- Country (sports): Russia
- Residence: Moscow, Russia
- Born: February 23, 1985 (age 41) Moscow, USSR
- Height: 1.91 m (6 ft 3 in)
- Turned pro: 2004
- Retired: 2022
- Plays: Right-handed (two-handed backhand)
- Prize money: US $1,187,840

Singles
- Career record: 10–28
- Career titles: 0
- Highest ranking: No. 78 (7 November 2016)

Grand Slam singles results
- Australian Open: 1R (2017)
- French Open: 2R (2017)
- Wimbledon: 1R (2014)
- US Open: 1R (2015)

Doubles
- Career record: 20–23
- Career titles: 0
- Highest ranking: No. 100 (17 March 2014)

Grand Slam doubles results
- Wimbledon: 2R (2016)

Medal record

Representing Russia

Tennis

Universiade
Silver medal – second place	2013 Kazan	Doubles
Bronze medal – third place	2013 Kazan	Singles
Bronze medal – third place	2013 Kazan	Team

Konstantin Vladimirovich Kravchuk (Russian: Константи́н Влади́мирович Кравчу́к, IPA: [kənstɐnʲˈtʲin krɐfˈtɕuk]; born 23 February 1985) is a Russian former professional tennis player. He is known for his strong serve and good skills on fast and indoor courts.

== Personal life ==
Kravchuk was born in Moscow to Vladimir, a chief of security, and Irina, a psychologist. He started playing tennis at age five. His mother played amateur tennis and it was her dream that the son become a professional tennis player.

Kravchuk married Veronika, a fashion model, on 12 February 2011; the couple have a daughter, Eva.

== Career ==
In 2013 at age 28 Kravchuk made his debut at the Davis Cup in the 2013 Davis Cup Europe/Africa Zone Group I second round play-off match against South Africa. In the third rubber, he partnered with Andrey Kuznetsov and defeated Raven Klaasen and Tucker Vorster in four sets. Kravchuk also took part in the fifth dead rubber against Jacob Coenraad de Klerk, who retired during the first set of the match.

After his debut Kravchuk took part in all matches in the Davis Cup until the 2017 season. He played all the doubles matches partnering with five different teammates.

== Challenger and Futures/World Tennis Tour finals ==
=== Singles: 29 (12–17) ===
Legend (singles) ATP Challenger Tour (3–8) ITF Futures/World Tennis Tour (9–9)	Titles by surface Hard (12–12) Clay (0–3) Grass (0–0) Carpet (0–2)

Result	W–L	Date	Tournament	Tier	Surface	Opponent	Score
Loss	0–1>	Aug 2004	Russia F2, Krasnoarmeysk	Futures	Hard	(Russia) Philipp Mukhometov	6–2, 3–6, 2–6
Win	1–1	Nov 2006	Russia F1, Sergiyev Posad	Futures	Hard (i)	(Kazakhstan) Alexey Kedryuk	6–1, 5–7, 7–6^{(8–6)}
Win	2–1	Dec 2007	Czech Republic F5, Frýdlant nad Ostravicí	Futures	Hard (i)	(Slovakia) Miloslav Mečíř Jr.	6–7^{(5–7)}, 6–4, 7–6^{(7–3)}
Win	3–1	May 2008	Uzbekistan F1, Andijan	Futures	Hard	(United States) Ryan Young	6–3, 6–3
Win	4–1	Dec 2009	Khanty-Mansiysk, Russia	Challenger	Hard (i)	(Spain) Marcel Granollers	1–6, 6–3, 6–2
Loss	4–2	Jul 2010	Penza, Russia	Challenger	Hard	(Kazakhstan) Mikhail Kukushkin	3–6, 7–6^{(7–3)}, 3–6
Loss	4–3	Aug 2010	Astana, Kazakhstan	Challenger	Hard	(Russia) Igor Kunitsyn	6–4, 6–7^{(5–7)}, 6–7^{(3–7)}
Loss	4–4	Sep 2010	Bangkok, Thailand	Challenger	Hard	(Bulgaria) Grigor Dimitrov	1–6, 4–6
Win	5–4	Feb 2013	Russia F1, Moscow	Futures	Hard (i)	(Latvia) Andis Juška	6–4, 5–7, 6–4
Loss	5–5	March 2013	Russia F2, Yoshkar-Ola	Futures	Hard (i)	(Netherlands) Boy Westerhof	6–1, 2–6, 4–6
Win	6–5	March 2013	Russia F3, Tyumen	Futures	Hard (i)	(Russia) Alexey Vatutin	6–3, 4–6, 6–4
Win	7–5	March 2013	Russia F4, Novokuznetsk	Futures	Hard (i)	(Belarus) Sergey Betov	6–4, 6–1
Win	8–5	Jun 2014	Russia F4, Moscow	Futures	Clay	(Russia) Philipp Davydenko	6–4, 7–6^{(7–2)}
Loss	8–6	Mar 2015	Kazan, Russia	Challenger	Hard (i)	(Russia) Aslan Karatsev	4–6, 6–4, 3–6
Loss	8–7	May 2015	Taipei, Taiwan	Challenger	Carpet (i)	(Australia) Sam Groth	7–6^{(7–5)}, 4–6, 6–7^{(3–7)}
Loss	8–8	May 2016	Taipei, Taiwan	Challenger	Carpet (i)	(United Kingdom) Daniel Evans	6–3, 4–6, 4–6
Win	9–8	May 2016	Busan, South Korea	Challenger	Hard	(United Kingdom) Daniel Evans	6–4, 6–4
Loss	9–9	Jun 2016	Fergana, Uzbekistan	Challenger	Hard	(Moldova) Radu Albot	4–6, 2–6
Loss	9–10	Jul 2016	Astana, Kazakhstan	Challenger	Hard	(Russia) Evgeny Donskoy	3–6, 3–6
Win	10–10	Oct 2016	Tashkent, Uzbekistan	Challenger	Hard	(Uzbekistan) Denis Istomin	7–5, 6–4
Loss	10–11	Aug 2018	Russia F6, Moscow,	Futures	Clay	(Russia) Andrey Chepelev	2–6, 4–6
Loss	10–12	Aug 2018	Russia F7, Moscow	Futures	Clay	(Russia) Alexander Zhurbin	3–6, 5–7
Loss	10–13	Sep 2018	Russia F8, Moscow	Futures	Clay	(Russia) Evgenii Tiurnev	1–6, 1–6
Win	11–13	Nov 2018	Thailand F7, Nonthaburi	Futures	Hard	(South Korea) Song Min-kyu	6–3, 6–3
Win	12–13	Nov 2018	Thailand F9, Nonthaburi	Futures	Hard	(Chinese Taipei) Lee Kuan-yi	7–5, 6–2
Loss	12–14	Apr 2019	M25, Andijan, Uzbekistan	World Tennis Tour	Hard	(Netherlands) Tim van Rijthoven	3–6, 7–6^{(7–5)}, 3–6
Loss	12–15	Aug 2019	M25, Pozoblanco, Spain	World Tennis Tour	Hard	(France) Rayane Roumane	4–6, 5–7
Loss	12–16	Sep 2019	M25, Ust-Kamenogorsk, Kazakhstan	World Tennis Tour	Hard	(Israel) Edan Leshem	2–2 ret.
Loss	12–17	Feb 2022	M25, Nur-Sultan, Kazakhstan	World Tennis Tour	Hard 8i)	(Czech Republic) David Poljak	6–5 Ret.

==== Doubles: 48 (24 titles, 24 runners-up) ====
Legend
Challengers (13–13)
Futures (11–11)

Outcome	No.	Date	Tournament	Surface	Partner	Opponents	Score
Runner-up	1.	18 February 2005	Zagreb, Croatia	Hard (i)	(Russia) Alexander Pavlioutchenkov	(Czech Republic) Jakub Hašek (Czech Republic) Robin Vik	6–2, 6–7^{(2–7)}, 6–7^{(5–7)}
Winner	2.	7 May 2005	Namangan, Uzbekistan	Hard	(South Africa) Raven Klaasen	(Russia) Sergei Demekhine (Russia) Andrei Stoliarov	6–2, 6–7^{(5–7)}, 7–6^{(7–4)}
Runner-up	3.	19 June 2005	Istanbul, Turkey	Hard (i)	(Russia) Alexander Pavlioutchenkov	(Germany) Frank Moser (Germany) Bernard Parun	6–4, 6–7^{(2–7)}, 4–6
Runner-up	4.	5 August 2005	Saransk, Russia	Clay	(Russia) Alexander Kudryavtsev	(Italy) Flavio Cipolla (Germany) Simon Stadler	6–7^{(2–7)}, 6–4, 6–7^{(3–7)}
Runner-up	5.	19 August 2005	Noginsk, Russia	Carpet	(Russia) Alexander Pavlioutchenkov	(Russia) Mikhail Elgin (Ukraine) Mikhail Filima	2–6, 2–6
Runner-up	6.	10 September 2005	Minsk, Belarus	Hard	(Russia) Denis Matsukevich	(Russia) Sergei Demekhine (Russia) Alexandre Krasnoroutskiy	6–7^{(8–10)}, 6–7^{(5–7)}
Runner-up	7.	18 September 2005	Minsk, Belarus	Clay	(Russia) Denis Matsukevich	(Russia) Sergei Demekhine (Russia) Alexandre Krasnoroutskiy	2–6, 6–4, 1–6
Runner-up	8.	22 April 2006	Guliston, Uzbekistan	Hard	(Russia) Alexander Kudryavtsev	(Russia) Mikhail Elgin (Kazakhstan) Alexey Kedryuk	7–5, 4–6, 4–6
Runner-up	9.	18 June 2006	Minsk, Belarus	Clay	(Russia) Denis Matsukevich	(Ukraine) Alexandr Dolgopolov (Belarus) Serguei Tarasevitch	6–7^{(4–7)}, 6–4, 3–6
Runner-up	10.	14 April 2007	Moscow, Russia	Hard (i)	(Russia) Evgeny Kirillov	(Belarus) Sergey Betov (Belarus) Vladimir Voltchkov	6–7^{(5–7)}, 3–6
Winner	11.	21 April 2007	Tyumen, Russia	Hard (i)	(Russia) Evgeny Kirillov	(Russia) Artem Sitak (Russia) Dmitri Sitak	7–6^{(7–5)}, 6–4
Winner	12.	12 April 2008	Moscow, Russia	Hard (i)	(Russia) Sergei Demekhine	(United Kingdom) Chris Eaton (United Kingdom) Alexander Slabinsky	6–1, 6–2
Winner	13.	23 May 2008	Fergana, Uzbekistan	Hard	(Poland) Łukasz Kubot	(Russia) Alexandre Krasnoroutskiy (Uzbekistan) Vaja Uzakov	6–4, 6–1
Runner-up	14.	14 December 2008	Frýdlant nad Ostravicí, Czech Republic	Hard (i)	(Latvia) Andis Juška	(United Kingdom) Colin Fleming (United Kingdom) Jonathan Marray	3–6, 2–3 RET
Winner	15.	16 January 2009	Stuttgart, Germany	Hard (i)	(Germany) Bastian Knittel	(Germany) David Klier (Germany) Philipp Marx	1–6, 7–6^{(7–1)}, [10–4]
Winner	16.	28 March 2009	Sarajevo, Bosnia and Herzegovina	Hard (i)	(Poland) Dawid Olejniczak	(United Kingdom) James Auckland (Netherlands) Rogier Wassen	6–2, 3–6, [10–7]
Winner	17.	10 April 2009	Moscow, Russia	Carpet (i)	(Slovakia) Lukáš Lacko	(Russia) Pavel Chekhov (Russia) Valery Rudnev	6–2, 6–4
Runner-up	18.	17 April 2009	Tyumen, Russia	Carpet (i)	(Russia) Evgeny Donskoy	(Kazakhstan) Alexey Kedryuk (Russia) Denis Matsukevich	3–6, 7–6^{(9–7)}, [13–15]
Runner-up	19.	18 September 2009	Mulhouse, France	Hard (i)	(Russia) Alexander Kudryavtsev	(Belgium) Ruben Bemelmans (Belgium) Yannick Mertens	6–3, 7–6^{(8–6)}
Runner-up	20.	19 June 2010	Bytom, Poland	Clay	(Ukraine) Ivan Sergeyev	(Slovakia) Ivo Klec (Ukraine) Artem Smirnov	6–1, 3–6, [3–10]
Winner	21.	30 July 2011	Astana, Kazakhstan	Hard	(Ukraine) Denys Molchanov	(Spain) Arnau Brugués-Davi (Tunisia) Malek Jaziri	7–6^{(7–4)}, 6–7^{(1–7)}, [10–3]
Runner-up	22.	19 August 2011	Karshi, Uzbekistan	Hard	(Ukraine) Denys Molchanov	(Russia) Mikhail Elgin (Russia) Alexander Kudryavtsev	6–3, 3–6, [9–11]
Winner	23.	20 July 2012	Penza, Russia	Hard	(Austria) Nikolaus Moser	(India) Yuki Bhambri (India) Divij Sharan	6–7^{(5–7)}, 6–3, [10–7]
Winner	24.	29 July 2012	Astana, Kazakhstan	Hard	(Ukraine) Denys Molchanov	(Slovakia) Karol Beck (Slovakia) Kamil Čapkovič	6–4, 6–3
Winner	25.	11 August 2012	Pozoblanco, Spain	Hard	(Ukraine) Denys Molchanov	(France) Adrian Mannarino (France) Maxime Teixeira	6–3, 6–3
Runner-up	26.	25 August 2012	Segovia, Spain	Hard	(Austria) Nikolaus Moser	(Italy) Stefano Ianni (Romania) Florin Mergea	2–6, 3–6
Winner	27.	30 September 2012	Lermontov, Russia	Clay	(Ukraine) Denys Molchanov	(Kazakhstan) Andrey Golubev (Kazakhstan) Yuri Schukin	6–3, 6–4
Runner-up	28.	24 November 2012	Tyumen, Russia	Hard (i)	(Ukraine) Denys Molchanov	(Slovakia) Ivo Klec (Sweden) Andreas Siljeström	3–6, 2–6
Winner	29.	23 February 2013	Moscow, Russia	Hard (i)	(Latvia) Andis Juška	(Belarus) Alexander Bury (Belarus) Nikolai Fidirko	6–4, 3–6, [10–6]
Runner-up	30.	7 April 2013	Saint-Brieuc, France	Hard (i)	(Netherlands) Jesse Huta Galung	(Poland) Tomasz Bednarek (Sweden) Andreas Siljeström	3–6, 6–4, [7–10]
Runner-up	31.	10 May 2013	Karshi, Uzbekistan	Hard	(Australia) Jordan Kerr	(Chinese Taipei) Chen Ti (Spain) Guillermo Olaso	6–7^{(5–7)}, 5–7
Winner	32.	17 August 2013	Kazan, Russia	Hard	(Russia) Victor Baluda	(Slovakia) Ivo Klec (Estonia) Jürgen Zopp	6–3, 6–4
Runner-up	33.	15 February 2014	Bergamo, Italy	Hard (i)	(Ukraine) Denys Molchanov	(Slovakia) Karol Beck (Slovakia) Michal Mertiňák	6–4, 5–7, [6–10]
Winner	34.	2 March 2014	Cherbourg, France	Hard	(Finland) Henri Kontinen	(France) Pierre-Hugues Herbert (France) Albano Olivetti	6–4, 6–7^{(3–7)}, [10–7]
Runner-up	35.	15 March 2014	Kazan, Russia	Hard (i)	(Russia) Victor Baluda	(Italy) Flavio Cipolla (Serbia) Goran Tošić	6–3, 5–7, [10–12]
Winner	36.	6 September 2014	Saint-Rémy-de-Provence, France	Hard	(France) Pierre-Hugues Herbert	(France) David Guez (France) Martin Vaïsse	6–1, 7–6^{(7–3)}
Winner	37.	1 August 2015	Astana, Kazakhstan	Hard	(Ukraine) Denys Molchanov	(South Korea) Chung Yun-seong (Uzbekistan) Jurabek Karimov	6–2, 6–2
Winner	38.	4 October 2015	Ağrı, Turkey	Hard	(Ukraine) Denys Molchanov	(Russia) Alexander Igoshin (Belarus) Yaraslav Shyla	6–3, 7–6^{(7–4)}
Runner-up	39.	19 March 2016	Kazan, Russia	Hard (i)	(Austria) Philipp Oswald	(Belarus) Alexander Bury (Slovakia) Igor Zelenay	2–6, 6–4, [6–10]
Winner	40.	2 April 2016	Ra'anana, Israel	Hard	(Ukraine) Denys Molchanov	(Israel) Jonathan Erlich (Austria) Philipp Oswald	4–6, 7–6^{(7–1)}, [10–4]
Winner	41.	28 April 2018	Karshi, Uzbekistan	Hard	(Russia) Roman Safiullin	(India) Saketh Myneni (India) Vijay Sundar Prashanth	3–6, 7–5, [10–7]
Runner-up	42.	2 June 2018	Andijan, Uzbekistan	Hard	(Russia) Roman Safiullin	(Belarus) Sergey Betov (Belarus) Yaraslav Shyla	4–6, 6–7^{(2–7)}
Runner-up	43.	9 June 2018	Namangan, Uzbekistan	Hard	(Russia) Roman Safiullin	(Uzbekistan) Sanjar Fayziev (Uzbekistan) Khumoyun Sultanov	6–7^{(6–8)}, 7–5, [8–10]
Winner	44.	1 September 2018	Moscow, Russia	Clay	(Russia) Alexander Pavlioutchenkov	(Russia) Bogdan Bobrov (Russia) Maxim Ratniuk	6–2, 4–6, [10–6]
Winner	45.	16 March 2019	Kazan, Russia	Hard (i)	(Russia) Alexander Pavlioutchenkov	(Germany) Jeremy Jahn (Germany) Julian Lenz	w/o
Winner	46.	13 July 2019	Almaty, Kazakhstan	Hard	(Kazakhstan) Andrey Golubev	(United States) Sebastian Korda (Kazakhstan) Denis Yevseyev	6–3, 6–2
Winner	47.	31 August 2019	Ust-Kamenogorsk, Kazakhstan	Hard	(Russia) Alexander Pavlioutchenkov	(United States) Sagadat Ayap (Kazakhstan) Grigoriy Lomakin	7–5, 6–3
Runner-up	48.	13 March 2021	Saint Petersburg, Russia	Hard (i)	(Kazakhstan) Denis Yevseyev	(Netherlands) Jesper de Jong (Netherlands) Sem Verbeek	1–6, 6–3, [5–10]

== National representation ==
=== Davis Cup (10–7) ===
Group membership World Group (0–2) WG Play-off (1–3) Group I (9–2) Group II (0–0) Group III (0–0) Group IV (0–0)	Matches by surface Hard (10–6) Clay (0–1) Grass (0–0) Carpet (0–0)	Matches by type Singles (3–3) Doubles (7–4)

- ▲ ▼ indicates the outcome of the Davis Cup match followed by the score, date, place of event, the zonal classification and its phase, and the court surface.

Rubber outcome	No.	Rubber	Match type (partner if any)	Opponent nation	Opponent player(s)	Score
▲5–0; 25–27 October 2013; Olympic Stadium, Moscow, Russia; Europe/Africa Second round play-off; Hard(i) surface
Victory	1	III	Doubles (with Andrey Kuznetsov)	South Africa	Raven Klaasen / Tucker Vorster	2–6, 6–3, 7–6^{(7–4)}, 6–2
Victory	2	V	Singles (dead rubber)	South Africa	Jacob Coenraad de Klerk	4–1, ret.
▼2–3; 31 January – 2 February 2014; Olympic Stadium, Moscow, Russia; Europe/Africa First round; Hard(i) surface
Defeat	3	III	Doubles (with Karen Khachanov)	Poland	Mariusz Fyrstenberg / Marcin Matkowski	6–2, 4–6, 1–6, 0–6
▲4–1; 12–14 September 2014; Olympic Stadium, Moscow, Russia; Europe/Africa Second round play-off; Hard(i) surface
Victory	4	III	Doubles (with Andrey Rublev)	Portugal	Gastão Elias / João Sousa	6–3, 6–4, 6–4
Defeat	5	IV	Singles (dead rubber)	Portugal	Rui Machado	7–6^{(7–4)}, 4–6, 1–6
▲4–1; 6–8 March 2015; Sport Complex Gazprom Dobycha Yamburg, Novy Urengoy, Russia; Europe/Africa First round; Hard(i) surface
Victory	6	III	Doubles (with Andrey Rublev)	Denmark	Thomas Kromann / Frederik Nielsen	6–1, 3–6, 6–3, 6–4
▲3–2; 17–19 July 2015; Fetisov Arena, Vladivostok, Russia; Europe/Africa Second round; Hard(i) surface
Victory	7	III	Doubles (with Evgeny Donskoy)	Spain	Marc López / David Marrero	4–6, 7–6^{(7–3)}, 5–7, 7–5, 6–4
▼1–4; 18–20 September 2015; Baikal-Arena, Irkutsk, Russia; World Group play-offs; Hard(i) surface
Defeat	8	III	Doubles (with Evgeny Donskoy)	Italy	Simone Bolelli / Fabio Fognini	5–7, 6–2, 6–7^{(5–7)}, 6–7^{(2–7)}
Defeat	9	V	Singles (dead rubber)	Italy	Paolo Lorenzi	4–6, 6–7^{(3–7)}
▲5–0; 4–6 March 2016; Kazan Tennis Academy, Kazan, Russia; Europe/Africa First round; Hard(i) surface
Victory	10	III	Doubles (with Evgeny Donskoy)	Sweden	Johan Brunström / Robert Lindstedt	6–3, 7–6^{(7–5)}, 6–2
Victory	11	V	Singles (dead rubber)	Sweden	Daniel Windahl	6–2, 6–2
▲4–1; 15–17 July 2016; National Tennis Centre, Moscow, Russia; Europe/Africa Second round; Hard surface
Victory	12	III	Doubles (with Andrey Rublev)	Netherlands	Robin Haase / Matwé Middelkoop	6–3, 6–4, 7–5
Victory	13	IV	Singles (dead rubber)	Netherlands	Robin Haase	6–4, 7–6^{(7–5)}
▲3–1; 17–18 September 2016; National Tennis Center, Moscow, Russia; World Group play-offs; Hard surface
Victory	14	III	Doubles (with Andrey Rublev)	Kazakhstan	Andrey Golubev / Aleksandr Nedovyesov	6–3, 6–7^{(3–7)}, 6–2, 7–5
▼1–4; 3–5 February 2017; Čair Sports Center, Niš, Serbia; World Group; Hard(i) surface
Defeat	15	III	Doubles (with Andrey Kuznetsov)	Serbia	Viktor Troicki / Nenad Zimonjić	3–6, 6–7^{(3–7)}, 7–6^{(7–5)}, 4–6
Defeat	16	IV	Singles (dead rubber)	Serbia	Dušan Lajović	3–6, 6–4, 3–6
▼1–3; 15–17 September 2017; Kopaszi Dam, Budapest, Hungary; World Group play-offs; Clay surface
Defeat	17	III	Doubles (with Daniil Medvedev)	(Hungary) Serbia	Attila Balázs / Márton Fucsovics	6–7^{(4–7)}, 4–6, 6–7^{(4–7)}

=== ATP Cup (2–1) ===
Matches by surface
Hard (2–1)
Clay (0–0)
Grass (0–0)

Matches by type
Singles (0–0)
Doubles (2–1)

Rubber outcome	No.	Rubber	Match type (partner if any)	Opponent nation	Opponent player(s)	Score
▲8–1; 3–7 January 2020; Perth Arena, Perth, Australia; Group stage; Hard surface
Victory	1	III	Doubles (with Teymuraz Gabashvili)	Norway	Viktor Durasovic / Casper Ruud	7–6^{(7–4)}, 6–4
3–3; 10–12 January 2020; Ken Rosewall Arena, Sydney, Australia; Knockout stage; Hard surface
Victory	2	III	Doubles (with Teymuraz Gabashvili)	Argentina	Máximo González / Andrés Molteni	7–6^{(7–5)}, 6–4
Defeat	3	III	Doubles (with Teymuraz Gabashvili)	Serbia	Nikola Čačić / Viktor Troicki	4–6, 6–7^{(7–9)}
