= Denis Matsukevich =

Russian tennis player

- Country (sports): Russia
- Residence: Kaliningrad, Russia
- Born: 28 March 1986 (age 38); Minsk, Belarus
- Height: 1.90 m (6 ft 3 in)
- Plays: Right-handed (double-handed forehand)
- Prize money: $154,236

Singles
- Career record: 1–3
- Career titles: 0
- Highest ranking: No. 244 (4 July 2011)

Doubles
- Career record: 0–0
- Highest ranking: No. 155 (27 July 2009)
- Last updated on: 13 July 2011.

Denis Sergeyevich Matsukevich (Дени́с Серге́евич Мацуке́вич; born 28 March 1986) is a professional tennis player from Russia.

He swept five singles Futures titles in his career. His coach is Valeriy Skhliar. He often struggled at higher levels. His only match win at ATP Tour level came in 2007, when he defeated Igor Kunitsyn in St. Petersburg. At ATP Challenger Tour level he reached seven quarter-finals; Samarkand 2008 (l. Denis Istomin), Astana 2010 (l. Konstantin Kravchuk), Fergana 2011 (l. Yūichi Sugita), Tashkent 2011 (l. Konstantin Kravchuk), Karshi 2013 (l. Prakash Amritraj), Eckental 2014 (l. Mirza Bašić) and Brescia 2014 (l. Farrukh Dustov).

== Career titles ==
Legend (singles)
Challengers (0)
Futures (5)

No.	Date	Tournament	Surface	Opponent in the final	Score
1.	22 May 2006	Bytom, Poland	Clay	(Germany) Gero Kretschmer	6–3, 6–2
2.	27 September 2010	Hambach, Germany	Carpet	(Latvia) Kārlis Lejnieks	6–4, 6–4
3.	7 March 2011	Cherkasy, Ukraine	Hard	(Ukraine) Artem Smirnov	7–6^{(7–3)}, 4–6, 6–3
4.	14 March 2011	Moscow, Russia	Hard	(Belarus) Sergey Betov	7–5, 6–2
5.	25 April 2011	Almaty Kazakhstan	Hard	(Russia) Ervand Gasparyan	6–1, 6–2
