= 2014 Open de la Réunion – Singles =

Singles
- 2014 Open de la Réunion

Final
- Champion: (Netherlands) Robin Haase
- Runner-up: (France) Florent Serra
- Score: 3–6, 6–1, 7–5

Events
Singles	Doubles
← 2013 ·	Open de la Réunion	· 2015 →

Robin Haase won the tournament, defeating Florent Serra in the final.

== Seeds ==
1. (Netherlands) Robin Haase (champion)
2. (Lithuania) Ričardas Berankis (semifinals)
3. (United Kingdom) James Ward (semifinals)
4. (Spain) Pere Riba (quarterfinals)
5. (United States) Austin Krajicek (quarterfinals)
6. (Spain) Enrique López-Pérez (first round)
7. (India) Ramkumar Ramanathan (second round)
8. (France) Tristan Lamasine (second round)

== Draw ==
=== Key ===
- Q = Qualifier
- WC = Wild card
- LL = Lucky loser
- Alt = Alternate
- SE = Special exempt
- PR = Protected ranking
- ITF = ITF entry
- JE = Junior exempt
- w/o = Walkover
- r = Retired
- d = Defaulted
- SR = Special ranking

=== Finals ===
Semifinals
1	(Netherlands) Robin Haase	6	7^{7}
3	(United Kingdom) James Ward	3	6^{2}
(France) Florent Serra	6	6^{1}	6
2	(Lithuania) Ričardas Berankis	1	7^{7}	4

Final
1	(Netherlands) Robin Haase	3	6	7
(France) Florent Serra	6	1	5

=== Top half ===
First round
1	(Netherlands) R Haase	3	6	6
(France) F Martin	6	4	3
(Croatia) M Pavić	7^{7}	6
Q	(Luxembourg) U Nastasi	6^{4}	3
(France) Julien Obry	5	3
(Belgium) J Cagnina	7	6
(Croatia) Stefan Merunka	3	0
8	(France) T Lamasine	6	6
3	(United Kingdom) J Ward	6	6
WC	(France) M Teixeira	1	1
(Netherlands) B Westerhof	6	3	7^{7}
(South Africa) N Scholtz	3	6	6^{1}
(Netherlands) A van der Duim	2	6^{5}
(France) J Eysseric	6	7^{7}
Q	(Germany) G Kretschmer	4	4
5	(United States) A Krajicek	6	6

Second round
1	(Netherlands) R Haase	7^{7}	6
(Croatia) M Pavić	6^{5}	2
(Belgium) J Cagnina	6	6
8	(France) T Lamasine	2	3
3	(United Kingdom) J Ward
(Netherlands) B Westerhof	wo.
(France) J Eysseric	4	4
5	(United States) A Krajicek	6	6

Quarterfinals
1	(Netherlands) R Haase	6	6
(Belgium) J Cagnina	4	2
3	(United Kingdom) J Ward	6	6
5	(United States) A Krajicek	1	4

Semifinals
1	(Netherlands) R Haase	6	7^{7}
3	(United Kingdom) J Ward	3	6^{2}

=== Bottom half ===
First round
6	(Spain) E López-Pérez	5	4
(France) F Serra	7	6
(France) H Nys	6	2	4
(Slovakia) F Horanský	4	6	6
(South Africa) R Roelofse	3	7^{9}	3
WC	(France) Élie Rousset	6	6^{7}	6
(Portugal) F Gil	6	4	6^{6}
4/WC	(Spain) P Riba	4	6	7^{8}
7	(India) R Ramanathan	7	6
Q	(Switzerland) L Margaroli	5	3
(France) A Musialek	3	6	4
WC	(France) G Barrère	6	2	6
(India) J Nedunchezhiyan	3	3
(Russia) K Khachanov	6	6
Q	(France) Lionel Mansour	0	2
2	(Lithuania) R Berankis	6	6

Second round
(France) F Serra	7	6
(Slovakia) F Horanský	5	0
WC	(France) É Rousset	1	4
4/WC	(Spain) P Riba	6	6
7	(India) R Ramanathan	4	7^{7}	6^{1}
WC	(France) G Barrère	6	6^{4}	7^{7}
(Russia) K Khachanov	5	4
2	(Lithuania) R Berankis	7	6

Quarterfinals
(France) F Serra	6	6^{2}	6
4/WC	(Spain) P Riba	4	7^{7}	4
WC	(France) G Barrère	2	3
2	(Lithuania) R Berankis	6	6

Semifinals
(France) F Serra	6	6^{1}	6
2	(Lithuania) R Berankis	1	7^{7}	4
