= 2014 Open de la Réunion – Doubles =

Doubles
- 2014 Open de la Réunion

Final
- Champions: (Netherlands) Robin Haase (Croatia) Mate Pavić
- Runners-up: (France) Jonathan Eysseric (France) Fabrice Martin
- Score: 7–5 4–6 [10–7]

Events
Singles	Doubles
← 2013 ·	Open de la Réunion	· 2015 →

Robin Haase and Mate Pavić won the tournament, defeating French couple Jonathan Eysseric and Fabrice Martin in the final. Robin Haase won the singles competition, too.

== Seeds ==
1. (Netherlands) Robin Haase / (Croatia) Mate Pavić (champions)
2. (Republic of Ireland) James Cluskey / (Germany) Gero Kretschmer (quarterfinals)
3. (Netherlands) Antal van der Duim / (Netherlands) Boy Westerhof (quarterfinals)
4. (Spain) Enrique López-Pérez / (India) Jeevan Nedunchezhiyan (quarterfinals)

== Draw ==
=== Key ===
- Q = Qualifier
- WC = Wild card
- LL = Lucky loser
- Alt = Alternate
- SE = Special exempt
- PR = Protected ranking
- ITF = ITF entry
- JE = Junior exempt
- w/o = Walkover
- r = Retired
- d = Defaulted
- SR = Special ranking

First round
1	(Netherlands) R Haase (Croatia) M Pavić	7	7^{7}
(Spain) P Riba (United Kingdom) J Ward	5	6^{5}
WC	(Slovakia) F Horanský (Croatia) Stefan Merunka	2	5
(Portugal) F Gil (India) R Ramanathan	6	7
3	(Netherlands) A van der Duim (Netherlands) B Westerhof	7^{7}	0	[10]
(France) A Musialek (France) Élie Rousset	6^{5}	6	[4]
(South Africa) R Roelofse (United States) M Seeberger	2	3
(France) G Barrère (France) F Serra	6	6
(Argentina) Matías Castro (France) M Teixeira	3	6^{0}
(France) J Eysseric (France) F Martin	6	7^{7}
WC	(France) F Jessin (France) Valentin Poterlot	1	1
4	(Spain) E López-Pérez (India) J Nedunchezhiyan	6	6
(France) Maxime Forcin (Luxembourg) U Nastasi	3	0
(France) T Lamasine (Switzerland) L Margaroli	6	6
(Belgium) J Cagnina (France) H Nys	6^{6}	1
2	(Republic of Ireland) J Cluskey (Germany) G Kretschmer	7^{8}	6

Quarterfinals
1	(Netherlands) R Haase (Croatia) M Pavić	6	6
(Portugal) F Gil (India) R Ramanathan	3	2
3	(Netherlands) A van der Duim (Netherlands) B Westerhof	0^{r}
(France) G Barrère (France) F Serra	2
(France) J Eysseric (France) F Martin	4	6	[10]
4	(Spain) E López-Pérez (India) J Nedunchezhiyan	6	4	[5]
(France) T Lamasine (Switzerland) L Margaroli	2	6	[11]
2	(Republic of Ireland) J Cluskey (Germany) G Kretschmer	6	2	[9]

Semifinals
1	(Netherlands) R Haase (Croatia) M Pavić	6	6
(France) G Barrère (France) F Serra	1	4
(France) J Eysseric (France) F Martin	7^{7}	6
(France) T Lamasine (Switzerland) L Margaroli	6^{5}	4

Final
1	(Netherlands) R Haase (Croatia) M Pavić	7	4	[10]
(France) J Eysseric (France) F Martin	5	6	[7]
