= 2013 PTT Cup – Singles =

Singles
- 2013 PTT Cup

Final
- Champion: (Germany) Benjamin Becker
- Runner-up: (Israel) Dudi Sela
- Score: 6–1, 2–6, 3–2 ret.

Events
Singles	Doubles
PTT Cup

This was the first edition of the tournament.

Benjamin Becker won the title after Dudi Sela retired at 6–1, 2–6, 3–2 in the final.

== Seeds ==
1. (Belgium) David Goffin (quarterfinals)
2. (Israel) Dudi Sela (final)
3. (Germany) Benjamin Becker (champion)
4. (Russia) Teymuraz Gabashvili (semifinals)
5. (Switzerland) Marco Chiudinelli (first round)
6. (Belarus) Uladzimir Ignatik (first round, retired because of a left thigh injury)
7. (Turkey) Marsel İlhan (first round)
8. (Kazakhstan) Mikhail Kukushkin (quarterfinals, withdrew because of a right shoulder injury)

== Draw ==
=== Key ===
- Q = Qualifier
- WC = Wild card
- LL = Lucky loser
- Alt = Alternate
- SE = Special exempt
- PR = Protected ranking
- ITF = ITF entry
- JE = Junior exempt
- w/o = Walkover
- r = Retired
- d = Defaulted
- SR = Special ranking

=== Finals ===
Semifinals
(Spain) Adrián Menéndez Maceiras	7	1	4
3	(Germany) Benjamin Becker	5	6	6
4	(Russia) Teymuraz Gabashvili	0	2
2	(Israel) Dudi Sela	6	6

Final
3	(Germany) Benjamin Becker	6	2	3
2	(Israel) Dudi Sela	1	6	2^{r}

=== Top half ===
First round
1	(Belgium) D Goffin	6	6
(Spain) G Granollers	1	4
Alt	(Austria) M Neuchrist	6	7
LL	(Russia) M Biryukov	4	5
(Spain) A Menéndez Maceiras	6	7
(Italy) R Ghedin	3	5
Alt	(Croatia) M Pavić	7^{7}	6
5	(Switzerland) M Chiudinelli	6^{4}	1
3	(Germany) B Becker	6	6
WC	(Turkey) Durukan Durmuş	2	0
(United Kingdom) B Klein	7	6
WC	(Turkey) A Yüksel	5	1
(Egypt) M Safwat	2	6	6
Q	(Croatia) F Veger	6	4	4
(Belarus) D Zhyrmont	7^{7}	1
6	(Belarus) U Ignatik	6^{3}	0^{r}

Second round
1	(Belgium) D Goffin	6	6
Alt	(Austria) M Neuchrist	3	2
(Spain) A Menéndez Maceiras	6	6
Alt	(Croatia) M Pavić	4	2
3	(Germany) B Becker	6	6
(United Kingdom) B Klein	4	3
(Egypt) M Safwat	6	3	6
(Belarus) D Zhyrmont	4	6	2

Quarterfinals
1	(Belgium) D Goffin	7	6^{5}	0
(Spain) A Menéndez Maceiras	5	7^{7}	6
3	(Germany) B Becker	6	6
(Egypt) M Safwat	1	4

Semifinals
(Spain) A Menéndez Maceiras	7	1	4
3	(Germany) B Becker	5	6	6

=== Bottom half ===
First round
7	(Turkey) M İlhan	2	1
(Slovakia) K Beck	6	6
(Chinese Taipei) T Chen	6	6
WC	(Turkey) T Altuna	3	1
WC	(Turkey) B Ergüden	3	7	6
(France) F Martin	6	5	4
(Croatia) N Mektić	2	2
4	(Russia) T Gabashvili	6	6
8	(Kazakhstan) M Kukushkin	6	3	6
Q	(United Kingdom) D Rice	3	6	1
(Hungary) M Fucsovics	6	7
(Georgia (country)) N Basilashvili	1	5
Alt	(United Kingdom) E Corrie	3	6^{4}
Q	(Russia) M Ledovskikh	6	7^{7}
Q	(Russia) A Kudryavtsev	1	2
2	(Israel) D Sela	6	6

Second round
(Slovakia) K Beck	6	6
(Chinese Taipei) T Chen	3	3
WC	(Turkey) B Ergüden	4	3
4	(Russia) T Gabashvili	6	6
8	(Kazakhstan) M Kukushkin	6	7^{7}
(Hungary) M Fucsovics	3	6^{3}
Q	(Russia) M Ledovskikh	0	3
2	(Israel) D Sela	6	6

Quarterfinals
(Slovakia) K Beck	6^{2}	7^{7}	4
4	(Russia) T Gabashvili	7^{7}	6^{5}	6
8	(Kazakhstan) M Kukushkin
2	(Israel) D Sela	w/o

Semifinals
4	(Russia) T Gabashvili	0	2
2	(Israel) D Sela	6	6
