= 2013 Guimarães Open =

- Date: 22–28 July
- Edition: 1st
- Surface: Hard
- Location: Guimarães, Portugal

Champions

Singles
- (Portugal) João Sousa

Doubles
- (Republic of Ireland) James Cluskey / (Austria) Maximilian Neuchrist
Guimarães Open

The 2013 Guimarães Open was a professional tennis tournament played on hard courts. It was the first edition of the tournament which was part of the 2013 ATP Challenger Tour. It took place in Guimarães, Portugal between 22 and 28 July 2013.

== Singles main-draw entrants ==
=== Seeds ===
Country	Player	Rank^{1}	Seed
POR	João Sousa	93	1
GER	Benjamin Becker	99	2
JPN	Go Soeda	109	3
ROU	Marius Copil	136	4
ESP	Daniel Muñoz de la Nava	145	5
ITA	Matteo Viola	147	6
ITA	Flavio Cipolla	150	7
FRA	Josselin Ouanna	160	8

- ^{1} Rankings are as of July 15, 2013.

=== Other entrants ===
The following players received wildcards into the singles main draw:

- (Portugal) João Domingues
- (Portugal) Gonçalo Pereira
- (Portugal) Frederico Ferreira Silva
- (Portugal) Rui Pedro Silva

The following players received entry from the qualifying draw:

- (Spain) Iván Arenas-Gualda
- (Spain) Andrés Artuñedo
- (Italy) Matteo Donati
- (Spain) Jaime Pulgar-García

== Champions ==
=== Singles ===
- (Portugal) João Sousa def. (Romania) Marius Copil 6–3, 6–0

=== Doubles ===
- (Republic of Ireland) James Cluskey / (Austria) Maximilian Neuchrist vs. (Spain) Roberto Ortega-Olmedo / (Spain) Ricardo Villacorta-Alonso 6–7^{(5–7)}, 6–2, [10–8]
