= 2018 Open Castilla y León – Men's singles =

Men's singles
- 2018 Open Castilla y León

Final
- Champion: (France) Ugo Humbert
- Runner-up: (Spain) Adrián Menéndez Maceiras
- Score: 6–3, 6–4

Events
| Singles | men | women |
| Doubles | men | women |
- Open Castilla y León

Jaume Munar was the defending champion but chose not to defend his title.

Ugo Humbert won the title after defeating Adrián Menéndez Maceiras 6–3, 6–4 in the final.

== Seeds ==
1. (Ukraine) Sergiy Stakhovsky (first round)
2. (Spain) Adrián Menéndez Maceiras (final)
3. (Italy) Luca Vanni (semifinals)
4. (Italy) Andrea Arnaboldi (semifinals)
5. (Netherlands) Scott Griekspoor (first round)
6. (Germany) Daniel Brands (quarterfinals)
7. (France) Ugo Humbert (champion)
8. (Netherlands) Tallon Griekspoor (withdrew)

== Draw ==
Key

- Q = Qualifier
- WC = Wild card
- LL = Lucky loser
- Alt = Alternate
- ITF = ITF entry
- PR = Protected ranking
- SR = Special ranking
- SE = Special exempt
- JE = Junior exempt
- JR = Junior Accelerator Programme entrant
- CO = College Accelerator Programme entrant
- NG = Next Gen Accelerator Program entrant
- w/o = Walkover
- r = Retired
- d = Defaulted

=== Finals ===
Semifinals
7 | (France) Ugo Humbert | 7^{7} | 6
3 | (Italy) Luca Vanni | 6^{5} | 4
4 | (Italy) Andrea Arnaboldi | 6^{6} | 6^{5}
2 | (Spain) Adrián Menéndez Maceiras | 7^{8} | 7^{7}

Final
7 | (France) Ugo Humbert | 6 | 6
2 | (Spain) Adrián Menéndez Maceiras | 3 | 4

=== Top half ===
First round
1 | (Ukraine) S Stakhovsky | 3 | 6 | 6^{5}
(Italy) M Viola | 6 | 2 | 7^{7}
(Ecuador) R Quiroz | 4 | 6 | 6
(Spain) Carlos Boluda-Purkiss | 6 | 4 | 4
(Belgium) Christopher Heyman | 4 | 4
(Portugal) João Monteiro | 6 | 6
(Spain) R Ortega Olmedo | 6 | 3 | 2
7 | (France) U Humbert | 4 | 6 | 6
3 | (Italy) L Vanni | 6 | 4 | 6
WC | (Spain) A Davidovich Fokina | 1 | 6 | 4
(Spain) C Gómez-Herrera | 6^{6} | 6^{3}
(Italy) F Baldi | 7^{8} | 7^{7}
(Italy) GM Moroni | 6 | 6
(France) D Guez | 3 | 2
(Russia) I Nedelko | 6 | 6
Q | (Egypt) K-M Maamoun | 3 | 4

Second round
(Italy) M Viola | 5 | 5
(Ecuador) R Quiroz | 7 | 7
(Portugal) J Monteiro | 1 | 3
7 | (France) U Humbert | 6 | 6
3 | (Italy) L Vanni | 6 | 3 | 6
(Italy) F Baldi | 4 | 6 | 4
(Italy) GM Moroni | 6 | 6^{1} | 6
(Russia) I Nedelko | 4 | 7^{7} | 3

Quarterfinals
(Ecuador) R Quiroz | 2 | 7 | 6^{7}
7 | (France) U Humbert | 6 | 5 | 7^{9}
3 | (Italy) L Vanni | 6 | 6
(Italy) GM Moroni | 1 | 4

Semifinals
7 | (France) U Humbert | 7^{7} | 6
3 | (Italy) L Vanni | 6^{5} | 4

=== Bottom half ===
First round
6 | (Germany) D Brands | 6 | 6
Q | (Spain) A Romero de Ávila Senise | 4 | 2
Q | (Vietnam) HN Lý | 6 | 6
LL | (France) S Doumbia | 2 | 1
(Bosnia and Herzegovina) T Brkić | 5 | 3
(Bosnia and Herzegovina) A Šetkić | 7 | 6
WC | (Spain) Miguel Semmler | 6 | 5 | 5
4 | (Italy) A Arnaboldi | 4 | 7 | 7
5 | (Netherlands) S Griekspoor | 6 | 1 | 6^{3}
WC | (Spain) A Artuñedo | 3 | 6 | 7^{7}
(Austria) M Neuchrist | 6 | 7^{7}
(Croatia) A Pavić | 3 | 6^{4}
(Turkey) C İlkel | 6 | 6
WC | (Spain) Jorge Hernando Ruano | 4 | 3
Q | (France) Y Jankovits | 4 | 2
2 | (Spain) A Menéndez Maceiras | 6 | 6

Second round
6 | (Germany) D Brands | 6 | 6
Q | (Vietnam) HN Lý | 2 | 4
(Bosnia and Herzegovina) A Šetkić | 3 | 3
4 | (Italy) A Arnaboldi | 6 | 6
WC | (Spain) A Artuñedo | 6 | 5
(Austria) M Neuchrist | 1 | 2^{r}
(Turkey) C İlkel | 0 | 2
2 | (Spain) A Menéndez Maceiras | 6 | 6

Quarterfinals
6 | (Germany) D Brands | 6 | 3 | 6^{5}
4 | (Italy) A Arnaboldi | 4 | 6 | 7^{7}
WC | (Spain) A Artuñedo | 6^{3} | 6^{6}
2 | (Spain) A Menéndez Maceiras | 7^{7} | 7^{8}

Semifinals
4 | (Italy) A Arnaboldi | 6^{6} | 6^{5}
2 | (Spain) A Menéndez Maceiras | 7^{8} | 7^{7}
