= 2013 PTT Cup =

- Date: 8–14 July
- Edition: 1st
- Surface: Hard
- Location: Istanbul, Turkey

Champions

Singles
- (Germany) Benjamin Becker

Doubles
- (Republic of Ireland) James Cluskey / (France) Fabrice Martin
PTT Cup

The 2013 PTT Cup is a professional tennis tournament played on hard courts. It is the 1st edition of the tournament which is part of the 2013 ATP Challenger Tour. It took place in Istanbul, Turkey between 8 and 14 July 2013.

== Singles main-draw entrants ==
=== Seeds ===
Country	Player	Rank^{1}	Seed
BEL	David Goffin	83	1
ISR	Dudi Sela	88	2
GER	Benjamin Becker	92	3
RUS	Teymuraz Gabashvili	137	4
SUI	Marco Chiudinelli	159	5
BLR	Uladzimir Ignatik	162	6
TUR	Marsel İlhan	180	7
KAZ	Mikhail Kukushkin	191	8

- ^{1} Rankings are as of June 24, 2013.

=== Other entrants ===
The following players received wildcards into the singles main draw:

- (Turkey) Tuna Altuna
- (Turkey) Durukan Durmuş
- (Turkey) Barış Ergüden
- (Turkey) Anıl Yüksel

The following players received entry as alternates into the singles main draw:

- (United Kingdom) Edward Corrie
- (Austria) Maximilian Neuchrist
- (Croatia) Mate Pavić

The following players received entry from the qualifying draw:

- (Russia) Alexander Kudryavtsev
- (Russia) Mikhail Ledovskikh
- (United Kingdom) David Rice
- (Croatia) Filip Veger

The following player received entry as a lucky loser:

- (Russia) Mikhail Biryukov

== Champions ==
=== Singles ===
- (Germany) Benjamin Becker def. (Israel) Dudi Sela 6–1, 2–6, 3–2 ret.

=== Doubles ===
- (Republic of Ireland) James Cluskey / (France) Fabrice Martin def. (United Kingdom) Brydan Klein / (South Africa) Ruan Roelofse 3–6, 6–3, [10–5]
