= 2013 Guimarães Open – Singles =

Singles
- 2013 Guimarães Open

Final
- Champion: (Portugal) João Sousa
- Runner-up: (Romania) Marius Copil
- Score: 6–3, 6–0

Events
Singles	Doubles
Guimarães Open

This was the first edition of the event.
João Sousa won the title, defeating Marius Copil 6–3, 6–0 in the final.

== Seeds ==
1. (Portugal) João Sousa (champion)
2. (Germany) Benjamin Becker (second round)
3. (Japan) Go Soeda (first round)
4. (Romania) Marius Copil (final)
5. (Spain) Daniel Muñoz de la Nava (quarterfinals, retired)
6. (Italy) Matteo Viola (quarterfinals)
7. (Italy) Flavio Cipolla (semifinals)
8. (France) Josselin Ouanna (second round)

== Draw ==
=== Key ===
- Q = Qualifier
- WC = Wild card
- LL = Lucky loser
- Alt = Alternate
- ITF = ITF entry
- PR = Protected ranking
- SR = Special ranking
- SE = Special exempt
- JE = Junior exempt
- JR = Junior Accelerator Programme entrant
- CO = College Accelerator Programme entrant
- NG = Next Gen Accelerator Program entrant
- w/o = Walkover
- r = Retired
- d = Defaulted

=== Finals ===
Semifinals
1	(Portugal) João Sousa	6	6
7	(Italy) Flavio Cipolla	3	4
4	(Romania) Marius Copil	6	2	6
Q	(Spain) Andrés Artuñedo	2	6	4

Final
1	(Portugal) João Sousa	6	6
4	(Romania) Marius Copil	3	0

=== Top half ===
First round
1	(Portugal) J Sousa	3	7^{10}	6
(France) Antoine Benneteau	6	6^{8}	4
(Spain) R Ortega Olmedo	6	6
WC	(Portugal) Rui Pedro Silva	0	0
Q	(Spain) Jaime Pulgar-García	3	4
(Switzerland) A Bossel	6	6
(Slovakia) I Klec	6	3	4
6	(Italy) M Viola	0	6	6
3	(Japan) G Soeda	4	2
(France) Jules Marie	6	6
Q	(Italy) M Donati	4	7^{7}	4
(Austria) M Neuchrist	6	6^{4}	6
WC	(Portugal) FF Silva	3	3
(Spain) A Menéndez Maceiras	6	6
WC	(Portugal) Gonçalo Pereira	1	5
7	(Italy) F Cipolla	6	7

Second round
1	(Portugal) J Sousa	6	6
(Spain) R Ortega Olmedo	2	0
(Switzerland) A Bossel	2	2
6	(Italy) M Viola	6	6
(France) J Marie	4	3
(Austria) M Neuchrist	6	6
(Spain) A Menéndez Maceiras	1	0^{r}
7	(Italy) F Cipolla	6	3

Quarterfinals
1	(Portugal) J Sousa	2	6	6
6	(Italy) M Viola	6	4	0
(Austria) M Neuchrist	3	2
7	(Italy) F Cipolla	6	6

Semifinals
1	(Portugal) J Sousa	6	6
7	(Italy) F Cipolla	3	4

=== Bottom half ===
First round
8	(France) J Ouanna	3	6	7
(United Kingdom) A Ward	6	3	5
(Japan) T Daniel	6	6
(Belarus) U Ignatik	4	0
WC	(Portugal) J Domingues	4	6	6
(Lithuania) L Grigelis	6	0	3
(Italy) W Trusendi	4	3
4	(Romania) M Copil	6	6
5	(Spain) D Muñoz de la Nava	6	3	6
(Czech Republic) Michal Konečný	4	6	2
Q	(Spain) Iván Arenas-Gualda	6	6
(Italy) Edoardo Eremin	4	2
(France) G Burquier	2	6^{3}
Q	(Spain) A Artuñedo	6	7^{7}
(Italy) A Bega	3	2
2	(Germany) B Becker	6	6

Second round
8	(France) J Ouanna	6	3	3
(Japan) T Daniel	2	6	6
WC	(Portugal) J Domingues	3	2
4	(Romania) M Copil	6	6
5	(Spain) D Muñoz de la Nava	6	6
Q	(Spain) I Arenas-Gualda	0	3
Q	(Spain) A Artuñedo	6	7
2	(Germany) B Becker	3	5

Quarterfinals
(Japan) T Daniel	6	3	4
4	(Romania) M Copil	4	6	6
5	(Spain) D Muñoz de la Nava	5	1^{r}
Q	(Spain) A Artuñedo	7	4

Semifinals
4	(Romania) M Copil	6	2	6
Q	(Spain) A Artuñedo	2	6	4
