= 2013 PTT Cup – Doubles =

Doubles
- 2013 PTT Cup

Final
- Champions: (Republic of Ireland) James Cluskey (France) Fabrice Martin
- Runners-up: (United Kingdom) Brydan Klein (South Africa) Ruan Roelofse
- Score: 3–6, 6–3, [10–5]

Events
Singles	Doubles
- PTT Cup

This was the first edition of the tournament.

James Cluskey and Fabrice Martin won the final 3–6, 6–3, [10–5] against Brydan Klein and Ruan Roelofse.

== Seeds ==
1. (Thailand) Sanchai Ratiwatana / (Thailand) Sonchat Ratiwatana (first round)
2. (Croatia) Marin Draganja / (Croatia) Mate Pavić (first round)
3. (United Kingdom) Brydan Klein / (South Africa) Ruan Roelofse (final)
4. (United Kingdom) David Rice / (United Kingdom) Sean Thornley (first round)

== Draw ==
Key

- Q = Qualifier
- WC = Wild card
- LL = Lucky loser
- Alt = Alternate
- ITF = ITF entry
- PR = Protected ranking
- SR = Special ranking
- SE = Special exempt
- JE = Junior exempt
- JR = Junior Accelerator Programme entrant
- CO = College Accelerator Programme entrant
- NG = Next Gen Accelerator Program entrant
- w/o = Walkover
- r = Retired
- d = Defaulted

=== Draw ===
First round
1	(Thailand) Sa Ratiwatana (Thailand) So Ratiwatana	0^{r}
(Republic of Ireland) J Cluskey (France) F Martin	3
(Russia) T Gabashvili (Belgium) D Goffin	6	6
(Turkey) T Altuna (Georgia (country)) N Basilashvili	3	3
4	(United Kingdom) D Rice (United Kingdom) S Thornley	6^{3}	6	[9]
(Spain) G Granollers (Spain) A Menéndez-Maceiras	7^{7}	2	[11]
WC	(Turkey) Haluk Akkoyen (Turkey) B Ergüden	2	6	[6]
(Chinese Taipei) T Chen (Belarus) D Zhyrmont	6	3	[10]
(Slovakia) K Beck (Belarus) U Ignatik	6	3	[10]
(Switzerland) M Chiudinelli (Israel) D Sela	2	6	[6]
WC	(Germany) B Becker (Turkey) Durukan Durmuş	4	7^{7}	[7]
3	(United Kingdom) B Klein (South Africa) R Roelofse	6	6^{3}	[10]
WC	(Turkey) C İlkel (Turkey) Efe Yurtaçan	5	2
(Croatia) N Mektić (Croatia) F Veger	7	6
(Italy) R Ghedin (Austria) M Neuchrist	6	7^{7}
2	(Croatia) M Draganja (Croatia) M Pavić	3	6^{2}

Quarterfinals
(Republic of Ireland) J Cluskey (France) F Martin	7^{7}	6
(Russia) T Gabashvili (Belgium) D Goffin	6^{2}	4
(Spain) G Granollers (Spain) A Menéndez-Maceiras	6	7
(Chinese Taipei) T Chen (Belarus) D Zhyrmont	2	5
(Slovakia) K Beck (Belarus) U Ignatik	6^{5}	2
3	(United Kingdom) B Klein (South Africa) R Roelofse	7^{7}	6
(Croatia) N Mektić (Croatia) F Veger	1	6^{10}
(Italy) R Ghedin (Austria) M Neuchrist	6	7^{12}

Semifinals
(Republic of Ireland) J Cluskey (France) F Martin	4	6	[10]
(Spain) G Granollers (Spain) A Menéndez-Maceiras	6	3	[8]
3	(United Kingdom) B Klein (South Africa) R Roelofse	6	1	[10]
(Italy) R Ghedin (Austria) M Neuchrist	1	6	[8]

Final
(Republic of Ireland) J Cluskey (France) F Martin	3	6	[10]
3	(United Kingdom) B Klein (South Africa) R Roelofse	6	3	[5]
