= 2018 Open Castilla y León =

- Date: 30 July – 5 August
- Edition: 33rd (men); 4th (women)
- Category: ATP Challenger Tour; ITF Women's Circuit
- Surface: Hard
- Location: Segovia, Spain

Champions

Men's singles
- (France) Ugo Humbert

Women's singles
- (Russia) Liudmila Samsonova

Men's doubles
- (Spain) Andrés Artuñedo / (Spain) David Pérez Sanz

Women's doubles
- (Spain) Marina Bassols Ribera / (Spain) Olga Parres Azcoitia
- Open Castilla y León

The 2018 Open Castilla y León Villa De El Espinar was a professional tennis tournament played on outdoor hard courts. It was the 33rd edition, for men, and 4th edition, for women, of the tournament and part of the 2018 ATP Challenger Tour and the 2018 ITF Women's Circuit. It took place in El Espinar, Segovia, Spain, between 30 July – 5 August 2018.

== Men's singles main draw entrants ==
=== Seeds ===
Country	Player	Rank^{1}	Seed
UKR	Sergiy Stakhovsky	120	1
ESP	Adrián Menéndez Maceiras	149	2
ITA	Luca Vanni	191	3
ITA	Andrea Arnaboldi	200	4
NED	Scott Griekspoor	210	5
GER	Daniel Brands	217	6
FRA	Ugo Humbert	219	7
~~NED~~	~~Tallon Griekspoor~~	~~223~~	~~8~~

- ^{1} Rankings as of 23 July 2018.

=== Other entrants ===
The following players received wildcards into the singles main draw:

- (Spain) Andrés Artuñedo
- (Spain) Alejandro Davidovich Fokina
- (Spain) Jorge Hernando Ruano
- (Spain) Miguel Semmler

The following players received entry from the qualifying draw:

- (France) Yannick Jankovits
- (Vietnam) Lý Hoàng Nam
- (Egypt) Karim-Mohamed Maamoun
- (Spain) Alberto Romero de Ávila Senise

The following player received entry as a lucky loser:

- (France) Sadio Doumbia

== Women's singles main draw entrants ==
=== Seeds ===
Country	Player	Rank^{1}	Seed
ESP	Paula Badosa Gibert	172	1
ESP	Olga Sáez Larra	263	2
TUR	Başak Eraydın	270	3
FRA	Chloé Paquet	293	4
FRA	Manon Arcangioli	297	5
FRA	Tessah Andrianjafitrimo	337	6
RUS	Liudmila Samsonova	346	7
PAR	Montserrat González	349	8

- ^{1} Rankings as of 23 July 2018.

=== Other entrants ===
The following players received wildcards into the singles main draw:

- (Spain) Ainhoa Atucha Gómez
- (Spain) Lucía Cortez Llorca
- (Spain) Ángela Díez Plágaro
- (Spain) María Gutiérrez Carrasco

The following players received entry by special exempts:

- (Spain) Cristina Bucșa
- (Argentina) Paula Ormaechea

The following players received entry from the qualifying draw:

- (Germany) Irina Cantos Siemers
- (Spain) Alba Carrillo Marín
- (Serbia) Tamara Čurović
- (Croatia) Mariana Dražić
- (Finland) Mia Eklund
- (Spain) Andrea Lázaro García
- (Bulgaria) Aleksandrina Naydenova
- (Spain) Olga Parres Azcoitia

== Champions ==
=== Men's singles ===
- (France) Ugo Humbert def. (Spain) Adrián Menéndez Maceiras 6–3, 6–4.

=== Women's singles ===
- (Russia) Liudmila Samsonova def. (Turkey) Başak Eraydın, 6–2, 6–0

=== Men's doubles ===
- (Spain) Andrés Artuñedo / (Spain) David Pérez Sanz def. (Argentina) Matías Franco Descotte / (Portugal) João Monteiro 6–7^{(3–7)}, 6–3, [10–6].

=== Women's doubles ===
- (Spain) Marina Bassols Ribera / (Spain) Olga Parres Azcoitia def. (Serbia) Tamara Čurović / (Turkey) Başak Eraydın, 7–5, 6–4
