= 2018 Open Castilla y León – Men's doubles =

Men's doubles
- 2018 Open Castilla y León

Final
- Champions: (Spain) Andrés Artuñedo (Spain) David Pérez Sanz
- Runners-up: (Argentina) Matías Franco Descotte (Portugal) João Monteiro
- Score: 6–7^{(3–7)}, 6–3, [10–6]

Events
Singles	men	women
Doubles	men	women
- Open Castilla y León

Adrián Menéndez Maceiras and Sergiy Stakhovsky were the defending champions but withdrew before their quarterfinal match.

Andrés Artuñedo and David Pérez Sanz won the title after defeating Matías Franco Descotte and João Monteiro 6–7^{(3–7)}, 6–3, [10–6] in the final.

== Seeds ==
1. (India) Sriram Balaji / (India) Vishnu Vardhan (quarterfinals)
2. (Bosnia and Herzegovina) Tomislav Brkić / (Croatia) Ante Pavić (semifinals)
3. (Spain) Adrián Menéndez Maceiras / (Ukraine) Sergiy Stakhovsky (quarterfinals, withdrew)
4. (Italy) Filippo Baldi / (Italy) Andrea Pellegrino (first round)

== Draw ==
Key

- Q = Qualifier
- WC = Wild card
- LL = Lucky loser
- Alt = Alternate
- ITF = ITF entry
- PR = Protected ranking
- SR = Special ranking
- SE = Special exempt
- JE = Junior exempt
- JR = Junior Accelerator Programme entrant
- CO = College Accelerator Programme entrant
- NG = Next Gen Accelerator Program entrant
- w/o = Walkover
- r = Retired
- d = Defaulted

First round
1	(India) S Balaji (India) V Vardhan	6	6
(Russia) I Nedelko (Bosnia and Herzegovina) A Šetkić	0	3
(Ecuador) D Hidalgo (Ecuador) R Quiroz	7	4	[6]
WC	(Spain) Carlos Boluda-Purkiss (Spain) Miguel Semmler	5	6	[10]
3	(Spain) A Menéndez Maceiras (Ukraine) S Stakhovsky	3	6	[10]
(Bolivia) B Arias (Bolivia) F Zeballos	6	3	[5]
(France) Mick Lescure (France) A Olivetti	5	4
WC	(Argentina) MF Descotte (Portugal) João Monteiro	7	6
(France) D Guez (France) Y Jankovits	6	6
(Spain) S Martos Gornés (Spain) R Ortega Olmedo	3	3
(Spain) A Artuñedo (Spain) D Pérez Sanz	7^{9}	6^{6}	[10]
4	(Italy) F Baldi (Italy) A Pellegrino	6^{7}	7^{8}	[5]
(Turkey) T Altuna (Turkey) C İlkel	7^{7}	4	[10]
WC	(Venezuela) J Muñoz Abreu (Spain) Alberto Romero de Ávila Senise	6^{3}	6	[7]
(Italy) GM Moroni (Italy) L Vanni	3	5
2	(Bosnia and Herzegovina) T Brkić (Croatia) A Pavić	6	7

Quarterfinals
1	(India) S Balaji (India) V Vardhan	6^{5}	6^{5}
WC	(Spain) C Boluda-Purkiss (Spain) M Semmler	7^{7}	7^{7}
3	(Spain) A Menéndez Maceiras (Ukraine) S Stakhovsky
WC	(Argentina) MF Descotte (Portugal) J Monteiro	w/o
(France) D Guez (France) Y Jankovits	1	6	[8]
(Spain) A Artuñedo (Spain) D Pérez Sanz	6	3	[10]
(Turkey) T Altuna (Turkey) C İlkel	2	3
2	(Bosnia and Herzegovina) T Brkić (Croatia) A Pavić	6	6

Semifinals
WC	(Spain) C Boluda-Purkiss (Spain) M Semmler	5	6	[4]
WC	(Argentina) MF Descotte (Portugal) J Monteiro	7	2	[10]
(Spain) A Artuñedo (Spain) D Pérez Sanz	6^{3}	6	[10]
2	(Bosnia and Herzegovina) T Brkić (Croatia) A Pavić	7^{7}	3	[7]

Final
WC	(Argentina) MF Descotte (Portugal) J Monteiro	7^{7}	3	[6]
(Spain) A Artuñedo (Spain) D Pérez Sanz	6^{3}	6	[10]
