= 2011 Open de la Réunion – Singles =

Singles
- 2011 Open de la Réunion

Events
Singles	Doubles
← 2010 ·	Open de la Réunion	· 2012 →

It was the first edition of the tournament. All quarterfinal matches were cancelled by the supervisor, due to heavy rain and flooding.

== Seeds ==
The top two seeds received a by into the second round.

1. (France) Florent Serra (quarterfinals)
2. (Poland) Michał Przysiężny (quarterfinals)
3. (Austria) Andreas Haider-Maurer (second round, retired)
4. (France) Stéphane Robert (quarterfinals)
5. (France) Édouard Roger-Vasselin (second round, withdrew)
6. (Kazakhstan) Yuri Schukin (quarterfinals)
7. (France) Vincent Millot (first round)
8. (France) David Guez (second round)

== Draw ==
=== Key ===
- Q = Qualifier
- WC = Wild card
- LL = Lucky loser
- Alt = Alternate
- SE = Special exempt
- PR = Protected ranking
- ITF = ITF entry
- JE = Junior exempt
- w/o = Walkover
- r = Retired
- d = Defaulted
- SR = Special ranking

=== Top half ===
First round
(Italy) D Giorgini	7	6
(Belgium) N Desein	5	4
(France) A Gensse	6	6
(Austria) P Oswald	2	2
(Italy) T Fabbiano	7	3	1
5	(France) É Roger-Vasselin	6^{1}	6	6
4	(France) S Robert	6	6
WC	(France) Quentin Robert	1	2
(Austria) M Slanar	6	6
(Curaçao) M van Haasteren	3	4
Q	(France) Philippe Vadel	7	3	3
Q	(France) Mark Sibilla	5	6	6
(Switzerland) A Sadecky	7	6
7	(France) V Millot	5	2

Second round
1/WC	(France) F Serra	6	7
(Italy) D Giorgini	0	6^{6}
(France) A Gensse
5	(France) É Roger-Vasselin	w/o
4	(France) S Robert	6	6
(Austria) M Slanar	2	4
Q	(France) Mark Sibilla	3	2
(Switzerland) A Sadecky	6	6

Quarterfinals
1/WC	(France) F Serra
(France) A Gensse
4	(France) S Robert
(Switzerland) A Sadecky

Semifinals
(France)

=== Bottom half ===
First round
8	(France) D Guez	6	6
Q	(France) Olivier Duberville	2	2
(Netherlands) M Middelkoop	0	2
(France) M Rodrigues	6	6
Q	(France) Yann Drieux	2	1
(France) N Renavand	6	6
(South Africa) F Wolmarans	6^{4}	6^{14}
3	(Austria) A Haider-Maurer	7	7
6	(Kazakhstan) Y Schukin	7	6
(Austria) A Peya	5	0
(Finland) H Heliövaara	3	6	6
(Canada) P-L Duclos	6	1	1
(Japan) Yu Takahashi	0	2
WC	(Belgium) Clément Maas	6	6

Second round
8	(France) D Guez	7	0	0
(France) M Rodrigues	5	6	6
(France) N Renavand	6^{1}	3
3	(Austria) A Haider-Maurer	7	0	r
6	(Kazakhstan) Y Schukin	6	4	6
(Finland) H Heliövaara	4	6	3
WC	(Belgium) Clément Maas	2	7	1
2	(Poland) M Przysiężny	6	5	6

Quarterfinals
(France) M Rodrigues
(France) N Renavand
6	(Kazakhstan) Y Schukin
2	(Poland) M Przysiężny

Semifinals
(France)
