= 2011 Open de la Réunion – Doubles =

Doubles
- 2011 Open de la Réunion

Events
| Singles | Doubles |
- Open de la Réunion

The 2011 Open de la Réunion was the first edition of the tournament. All semifinal matches were cancelled by the supervisor, due to heavy rain and flooding.

== Seeds ==
All seeds received a bye into the second round.

1. (Austria) Alexander Peya / (Austria) Martin Slanar (semifinals)
2. (Canada) Pierre-Ludovic Duclos / (Austria) Philipp Oswald (quarterfinals, withdrew)
3. (Italy) Thomas Fabbiano / (Italy) Daniele Giorgini (quarterfinals, withdrew)
4. (Poland) Michał Przysiężny / (Kazakhstan) Yuri Schukin (semifinals)

== Draw ==
Key

- Q = Qualifier
- WC = Wild card
- LL = Lucky loser
- Alt = Alternate
- ITF = ITF entry
- PR = Protected ranking
- SR = Special ranking
- SE = Special exempt
- JE = Junior exempt
- JR = Junior Accelerator Programme entrant
- CO = College Accelerator Programme entrant
- NG = Next Gen Accelerator Program entrant
- w/o = Walkover
- r = Retired
- d = Defaulted

=== Draw ===
First round
(France) D Guez (France) É Roger-Vasselin | 6 | 7
(Netherlands) M Middelkoop (Curaçao) M van Haasteren | 3 | 5
WC | (France) Quentin Robert (France) Benjamin Simonet | 0 | 2
(France) A Gensse (France) N Renavand | 6 | 6
(France) Mark Sibilla (Japan) Yu Takahashi | 2 | 1
(Belgium) N Desein (France) S Robert | 6 | 6
(Finland) H Heliövaara (France) Mathieu Rodrigues | 6 | 6
(France) Fabrice de Fondaumière (France) Nicolas Dubau | 0 | 1

Quarterfinals
1 | (Austria) A Peya (Austria) M Slanar | 6 | 7
(France) D Guez (France) É Roger-Vasselin | 2 | 6^{2}
4 | (Poland) M Przysiężny (Kazakhstan) Y Schukin | 7 | 6
(France) A Gensse (France) N Renavand | 6^{4} | 4
(Belgium) N Desein (France) S Robert
3 | (Italy) T Fabbiano (Italy) D Giorgini | w/o
(Finland) H Heliövaara (France) M Rodrigues
2 | (Canada) P-L Duclos (Austria) P Oswald | w/o

Semifinals
1 | (Austria) A Peya (Austria) M Slanar
4 | (Poland) M Przysiężny (Kazakhstan) Y Schukin
(Belgium) N Desein (France) S Robert
(Finland) H Heliövaara (France) M Rodrigues

Final
(France)
