= 2011 Open de la Réunion =

- Date: 24–30 January
- Edition: 1st
- Surface: Hard
- Location: Saint-Denis, Réunion

Champions

Singles
- No championship awarded

Doubles
- No championship awarded
- Open de la Réunion

The 2011 Open de la Réunion was a professional tennis tournament played on hard courts. It was the first edition of the tournament which was part of the 2011 ATP Challenger Tour. It took place in Réunion and was originally scheduled to last between 24 and 30 January 2011. The tournament has not been finished, as all singles quarterfinal and doubles semifinal matches has been cancelled by the supervisor, due to heavy rain and flooding.

== Singles entrants ==
=== Seeds ===
Country	Player	Rank^{1}	Seed
FRA	Florent Serra	69	1
POL	Michał Przysiężny	84	2
AUT	Andreas Haider-Maurer	117	3
FRA	Stéphane Robert	124	4
FRA	Édouard Roger-Vasselin	125	5
KAZ	Yuri Schukin	127	6
FRA	Vincent Millot	160	7
FRA	David Guez	183	8

- Rankings are as of January 17, 2011.

=== Other entrants ===
The following players received wildcards into the singles main draw:

- (France) Florent Serra
- (France) Quentin Robert
- (Belgium) Clement Maas

The following players received entry from the qualifying draw:

- (France) Yann Drieux
- (France) Olivier Duberville
- (France) Mark Sibilla
- (France) Philippe Vadel

== Events ==
=== Singles ===
Singles event has not been completed due to flooding. No championship has been awarded.

=== Doubles ===
Doubles event has not been completed due to flooding. No championship has been awarded.
