= 2013 Guimarães Open – Doubles =

Doubles
- 2013 Guimarães Open

Final
- Champions: (Republic of Ireland) James Cluskey (Austria) Maximilian Neuchrist
- Runners-up: (Spain) Roberto Ortega-Olmedo (Spain) Ricardo Villacorta-Alonso
- Score: 6–7^{(5–7)}, 6–2, [10–8]

Events
Singles	Doubles
Guimarães Open

James Cluskey and Maximilian Neuchrist won the title, defeating Roberto Ortega-Olmedo and Ricardo Villacorta-Alonso 6–7^{(5–7)}, 6–2, [10–8] in the final.

== Seeds ==
1. (Italy) Flavio Cipolla / (Spain) Daniel Muñoz de la Nava (semifinals)
2. (Republic of Ireland) James Cluskey / (Austria) Maximilian Neuchrist (champion)
3. (Uruguay) Ariel Behar / (Spain) Carlos Poch-Gradin (semifinals)
4. (France) Josselin Ouanna / (France) Élie Rousset (quarterfinals)

== Draw ==
=== Key ===
- Q = Qualifier
- WC = Wild card
- LL = Lucky loser
- Alt = Alternate
- SE = Special exempt
- PR = Protected ranking
- ITF = ITF entry
- JE = Junior exempt
- w/o = Walkover
- r = Retired
- d = Defaulted
- SR = Special ranking

=== Draw ===
First round
1	(Italy) F Cipolla (Spain) D Muñoz de la Nava	6	6
(Spain) A Menéndez-Maceiras (Germany) Eric Scherer	2	4
(Italy) M Donati (Italy) Edoardo Eremin	2	6^{3}
(Spain) Iván Arenas-Gualda (Spain) Jaime Pulgar-García	6	7^{7}
4	(France) J Ouanna (France) Élie Rousset	7	6
WC	(Portugal) J Domingues (Portugal) Henrique Sousa	5	2
(Italy) W Trusendi (Italy) M Viola	1	4
(Spain) R Ortega-Olmedo (Spain) Ricardo Villacorta-Alonso	6	6
(Italy) A Bega (Italy) Erik Crepaldi	6	3	[5]
(Lithuania) L Grigelis (Belarus) U Ignatik	3	6	[10]
WC	(Portugal) José Ricardo Núñez (Portugal) Gonçalo Pereira	2	2
3	(Uruguay) A Behar (Spain) C Poch-Gradin	6	6
(Japan) T Daniel (United Kingdom) A Ward	6	6
(Portugal) Gonçalo Falcão (Portugal) FF Silva	4	4
WC	(Portugal) Vitor Silva (Portugal) Rui Pedro Silva	5	2
2	(Republic of Ireland) J Cluskey (Austria) M Neuchrist	7	6

Quarterfinals
1	(Italy) F Cipolla (Spain) D Muñoz de la Nava	7^{8}	6
(Spain) I Arenas-Gualda (Spain) J Pulgar-García	6^{6}	3
4	(France) J Ouanna (France) É Rousset	3	4
(Spain) R Ortega-Olmedo (Spain) R Villacorta-Alonso	6	6
(Lithuania) L Grigelis (Belarus) U Ignatik	2	4
3	(Uruguay) A Behar (Spain) C Poch-Gradin	6	6
(Japan) T Daniel (United Kingdom) A Ward	4	6^{6}
2	(Republic of Ireland) J Cluskey (Austria) M Neuchrist	6	7^{8}

Semifinals
1	(Italy) F Cipolla (Spain) D Muñoz de la Nava
(Spain) R Ortega-Olmedo (Spain) R Villacorta-Alonso	w/o
3	(Uruguay) A Behar (Spain) C Poch-Gradin	3	7^{8}	[8]
2	(Republic of Ireland) J Cluskey (Austria) M Neuchrist	6	6^{6}	[10]

Final
(Spain) R Ortega-Olmedo (Spain) R Villacorta-Alonso	7^{7}	2	[8]
2	(Republic of Ireland) J Cluskey (Austria) M Neuchrist	6^{5}	6	[10]
