= 2014 Open de la Réunion =

- Date: 25 October – 2 November
- Edition: 2nd
- Surface: Hard
- Location: Saint-Denis, Réunion
- Open de la Réunion

The 2014 Open de la Réunion was a professional tennis tournament played on hard courts. It was the second edition of the tournament which is part of the 2014 ATP Challenger Tour. It will take place in Saint-Denis, Réunion between 25 October and 2 November 2014.

Robin Haase won the tournament both in singles and in doubles.

== Singles entrants ==
=== Seeds ===
Country	Player	Rank^{1}	Seed
NED	Robin Haase	92	1
LTU	Ričardas Berankis	103	2
GBR	James Ward	111	3
ESP	Pere Riba	116	4
USA	Austin Krajicek	167	5
ESP	Enrique López Pérez	215	6
IND	Ramkumar Ramanathan	226	7
FRA	Tristan Lamasine	233	8

^{1} Rankings are as of October 20, 2014

=== Other entrants ===
The following players received wildcards into the singles main draw:

- (France) Maxime Teixeira
- (France) Elie Rousset
- (Belgium) Pere Riba
- (France) Grégoire Barrère

The following players received entry from the qualifying draw:

- (Luxembourg) Ugo Nastasi
- (Germany) Gero Kretschmer
- (Italy) Luca Margaroli
- (France) Lionel Mansour

== Champions ==
=== Singles ===
- (Netherlands) Robin Haase def. (France) Florent Serra, 3–6, 6–1, 7–5

=== Doubles ===
- (Netherlands) Robin Haase / (Croatia) Mate Pavić def. (France) Jonathan Eysseric / (France) Fabrice Martin, 7–5, 4–6, [10–7]
