= PTT İstanbul Cup =

- 2013 PTT Cup

Defunct tennis tournament
- Event name: Istanbul
- Location: Istanbul, Turkey
- Category: ATP Challenger Tour
- Surface: Hard
- Draw: 32S/17Q/16D
- Prize money: €42,500
- Website: Website

The PTT Cup was a professional tennis tournament played on hardcourts. It was part of the ATP Challenger Tour. It was held in Istanbul, Turkey in 2013.

== Past finals ==
=== Singles ===
Year	Champion	Runner-up	Score	Ref.
2013	(Germany) Benjamin Becker	(Israel) Dudi Sela	6–1, 2–6, 3–2 ret.	

=== Doubles ===
Year	Champions	Runners-up	Score
2013	(Republic of Ireland) James Cluskey (France) Fabrice Martin	(United Kingdom) Brydan Klein (South Africa) Ruan Roelofse	3–6, 6–3, [10–5]
