= Cividino =

Coordinates: 45°36′37″N 9°53′30″E

Cividino (Siidì in bergamasque) is a frazione that is part of the Castelli Calepio community, in the Province of Bergamo. It has nearly 4000 inhabitants.
