= Roberto Ortega Olmedo =

Spanish tennis player (born 1991)

- Country (sports): Spain
- Born: 30 April 1991 (age 34)
- Prize money: $294,538

Singles
- Career record: 0-1 (in ATP World Tour and Grand Slam main draw matches, and in Davis Cup),
- Career titles: 0
- Highest ranking: No. 232 (18 November 2019)

Grand Slam singles results
- Australian Open: Q1 (2020)

Doubles
- Career record: 0-0 (in ATP World Tour and Grand Slam main draw matches, and in Davis Cup)
- Career titles: 0
- Highest ranking: No. 226 (19 March 2018)

Roberto Ortega Olmedo (Spanish pronunciation: [roˈβeɾto oɾˈteɣa olˈmeðo]; born 30 April 1991) is a Spanish professional tennis player.

He advanced through the qualifiers of the 2016 Geneva Open to make the main draw defeating Michael Linzer and wild card Johan Nikles. In the main draw he was defeated in straight set by Lukáš Rosol.

== Challenger and Futures finals ==
=== Singles: 28 (15–13) ===
Legend (singles) ATP Challenger Tour (0–1) ITF Futures Tour (15–12)	Titles by surface Hard (13–12) Clay (0–0) Grass (0–0) Carpet (2–1)

Result	W–L	Date	Tournament	Tier	Surface	Opponent	Score
Loss	0–1	Jun 2011	Spain F21, Melilla	Futures	Hard	(Australia) Benjamin Mitchell	3–6, 1–6
Win	1–1	Apr 2013	Spain F9, Villajoyosa	Futures	Carpet	(Spain) Gerard Granollers Pujol	6–0, 5–7, 6–3
Loss	1–2	Nov 2010	Spain F38, Puerto de la Cruz	Futures	Carpet	(Belgium) Yannick Mertens	2–6, 3–6
Win	2–2	Nov 2010	Spain F40, Puerto de la Cruz	Futures	Carpet	(Spain) José Checa Calvo	7–5, 7–5
Win	3–2	Apr 2014	Malaysia F1, Kuching	Futures	Hard	(Spain) Carlos Boluda-Purkiss	6–0, 6–2
Win	4–2	Jun 2014	Spain F11, Sta. Margarida de Montbui	Futures	Hard	(Colombia) Juan Sebastián Gómez	7–5, 6–1
Win	5–2	Aug 2014	Spain F22, Ourense	Futures	Hard	(France) Antoine Escoffier	6–3, 6–2
Loss	5–3	Oct 2014	Spain F31, Madrid	Futures	Hard	(Spain) Oriol Roca Batalla	5–7, 4–6
Loss	5–4	Nov 2014	Kuwait F2, Meshref	Futures	Hard	(Germany) Daniel Masur	6–7^{(5–7)}, 5–7
Loss	5–5	Jun 2015	Spain F18, Palma del Río	Futures	Hard	(France) Tom Jomby	2–6, 4–6
Win	6–5	Oct 2015	Tunisia F26, El Kantaoui	Futures	Hard	(Netherlands) Tallon Griekspoor	6–1, 6–2
Win	7–5	Oct 2015	Spain F33, Madrid	Futures	Hard	(Spain) Carlos Gómez-Herrera	5–7, 7–5, 6–2
Loss	7–6	Oct 2015	Spain F34, Melilla	Futures	Hard	(United Kingdom) Alexander Ward	6–7^{(4–7)}, 7–5, 2–6
Loss	7–7	Dec 2015	Tunisia F34, El Kantaoui	Futures	Hard	(United Kingdom) Lloyd Glasspool	3–6, 4–6
Loss	7–8	Feb 2016	Portugal F1, Vale do Lobo	Futures	Hard	(Netherlands) Jesse Huta Galung	4–6, 7–5, 2–6
Loss	7–9	Apr 2016	Spain F8, Madrid	Futures	Hard	(Spain) Pablo Vivero González	5–7, 1–6
Win	8–9	Nov 2016	Spain F36, Cuevas del Almanzora	Futures	Hard	(Spain) Jaume Munar	6–0, 7–6^{(7–4)}
Loss	8–10	Dec 2016	Spain F39, Cuevas del Almanzora	Futures	Hard	(Japan) Akira Santillan	1–6, 1–6
Win	9–10	Feb 2017	Spain F6, Cornellà	Futures	Hard	(Spain) Oriol Roca Batalla	6–4, 6–3
Win	10–10	Mar 2017	Portugal F3, Loulé	Futures	Hard	(Portugal) João Domingues	6–2, 6–4
Win	11–10	Jul 2017	Spain F19, Bakio	Futures	Hard	(Spain) Alejandro Davidovich Fokina	0–6, 6–2, 6–1
Win	12–10	Jul 2017	Portugal F10, Torres Vedras	Futures	Hard	(Portugal) Frederico Ferreira Silva	6–3, 6–2
Win	13–10	Dec 2017	Qatar F4, Doha	Futures	Hard	(Sweden) Markus Eriksson	4–6, 6–3, 6–1
Loss	13–11	Mar 2018	Portugal F4, Quinta do Lago	Futures	Hard	(Spain) Alejandro Davidovich Fokina	5–7, 6–4, 1–6
Loss	13–12	Mar 2018	Portugal F5, Vilamoura	Futures	Hard	(South Africa) Lloyd Harris	6–4, 1–6, 0–6
Win	14–12	Jul 2018	Spain F17, Bakio	Futures	Hard	(France) Hugo Grenier	6–2, 3–0 ret.
Win	15–12	Nov 2018	USA F33, Columbus	Futures	Hard (i)	(United Kingdom) Jack Findel-Hawkins	3–6, 6–2, 6–2
Loss	15–13	Jan 2019	Koblenz, Germany	Challenger	Hard (i)	(Italy) Gianluca Mager	6–2, 6–7^{(6–8)}, 2–6

=== Doubles: 43 (22–21) ===
Legend (doubles) ATP Challenger Tour (0–3) ITF Futures Tour (22–18)	Titles by surface Hard (17–17) Clay (3–3) Grass (0–0) Carpet (2–1)

Result	W–L	Date	Tournament	Tier	Surface	Partner	Opponents	Score
Loss	0–1	Jun 2010	Spain F20, Puerto de la Cruz	Futures	Carpet	(Spain) Carlos Gómez-Herrera	(Spain) Georgi Rumenov Payakov (Portugal) João Sousa	6–7^{(2–7)}, 2–6
Win	1–1	Aug 2010	Spain F30, Vigo	Futures	Clay	(Spain) Abraham González-Jiménez	(Spain) Eduardo Nicolás Espin (Spain) Germán Puentes Alcañiz	1–6, 6–3, [10–5]
Win	2–1	May 2013	Portugal F5, Castelo Branco	Futures	Hard	(Spain) Ricardo Villacorta-Alonso	(Portugal) João Domingues (Portugal) André Gaspar Murta	6–1, 6–4
Loss	2–2	May 2013	Portugal F7, Coimbra	Futures	Hard	(Spain) Carlos Boluda-Purkiss	(Portugal) Gonçalo Falcão (Portugal) Fred Gil	6–7^{(4–7)}, 6–7^{(7–9)}
Win	3–2	Jun 2013	Portugal F8, Guimarães	Futures	Hard	(Spain) Carlos Boluda-Purkiss	(Italy) Riccardo Ghedin (Republic of Ireland) Daniel Glancy	6–2, 6–3
Loss	3–3	Jun 2013	Spain F17, Martos	Futures	Hard	(Spain) Ricardo Villacorta-Alonso	(India) Ramkumar Ramanathan (India) Ashwin Vijayragavan	3–6, 7–5, [9–11]
Loss	3–4	Jun 2013	Spain F19, Palma del Río	Futures	Hard	(Spain) Ricardo Villacorta-Alonso	(Spain) Juan-Samuel Arauzo-Martínez (Spain) Jaime Pulgar-García	5–7, 6–3, [6–10]
Loss	3–5	Jul 2013	Guimarães, Portugal	Challenger	Hard	(Spain) Ricardo Villacorta-Alonso	(Republic of Ireland) James Cluskey (Austria) Maximilian Neuchrist	7–6^{(7–5)}, 2–6, [8–10]
Loss	3–6	Sep 2013	Spain F31, Getafe	Futures	Hard	(Spain) Oriol Roca Batalla	(Spain) David Pérez Sanz (Spain) Jaime Pulgar-García	7–5, 4–6, [8–10]
Win	4–6	Oct 2013	Portugal F11, Guimarães	Futures	Hard	(Spain) Carlos Boluda-Purkiss	(Spain) Adam Anjurjo Hermida (Spain) Miguel Semmler	6–3, 6–4
Win	5–6	Nov 2013	Spain F38, Puerto de la Cruz	Futures	Carpet	(Spain) José Checa Calvo	(Spain) Jaume Pla Malfeito (United States) Dennis Uspensky	7–6^{(7–5)}, 6–4
Win	6–6	Nov 2013	Spain F39, Puerto de la Cruz	Futures	Carpet	(Spain) Carlos Boluda-Purkiss	(Spain) David Pérez Sanz (Spain) David Vega Hernández	6–1, 6–3
Win	7–6	Feb 2014	Turkey F1, Antalya	Futures	Hard	(Spain) Carlos Boluda-Purkiss	(Israel) Dekel Bar (Serbia) Marko Tepavac	6–1, 6–2
Loss	7–7	Feb 2014	Turkey F2, Antalya	Futures	Hard	(Spain) Carlos Boluda-Purkiss	(Turkey) Cem İlkel (Turkey) Anıl Yüksel	0–6, 6–7^{(3–7)}
Loss	7–8	Mar 2014	France F5, Balma	Futures	Hard (i)	(Spain) Carlos Boluda-Purkiss	(France) Antoine Benneteau (France) Alexis Musialek	3–6, 2–6
Loss	7–9	Jun 2014	Spain F11, Sta. Margarida de Montbui	Futures	Hard	(Spain) Óscar Burrieza López	(Spain) Sergio Martos Gornés (Spain) Pol Toledo Bagué	5–7, 6–2, [6–10]
Win	8–9	Oct 2014	Spain F31, Madrid	Futures	Hard	(Belgium) Yannick Mertens	(France) Antoine Escoffier (France) Matthieu Roy	6–2, 6–4
Win	9–9	Apr 2015	Spain F7, Alcalá de Henares	Futures	Hard	(Spain) Iván Arenas-Gualda	(Spain) Juan-Samuel Arauzo-Martínez (Spain) Jaime Pulgar-García	3–6, 6–4, [10–6]
Loss	9–10	Apr 2015	Spain F8, Madrid	Futures	Hard	(Spain) Carlos Boluda-Purkiss	(Spain) Juan-Samuel Arauzo-Martínez (Spain) Iván Arenas-Gualda	7–6^{(8–6)}, 4–6, [4–10]
Loss	9–11	May 2015	Portugal F7, Idanha-a-Nova	Futures	Hard	(Spain) Carlos Boluda-Purkiss	(Portugal) Nuno Deus (Portugal) João Domingues	5–7, 7–5, [7–10]
Loss	9–12	Oct 2015	Tunisia F26, El Kantaoui	Futures	Hard	(Lithuania) Lukas Mugevičius	(France) Benjamin Bonzi (France) Fabien Reboul	6–4, 4–6, [8–10]
Win	10–12	Oct 2015	Spain F34, Melilla	Futures	Hard	(Spain) Iván Arenas-Gualda	(Spain) Jorge Hernando Ruano (Spain) Ricardo Villacorta-Alonso	w/o
Win	11–12	Nov 2015	Tunisia F29, El Kantaoui	Futures	Hard	(France) Benjamin Bonzi	(Tunisia) Anis Ghorbel (Italy) Francesco Vilardo	6–0, 6–3
Win	12–12	Feb 2016	Portugal F1, Vale do Lobo	Futures	Hard	(Spain) Iván Arenas-Gualda	(Spain) Carlos Boluda-Purkiss (Spain) David Vega Hernández	4–6, 7–6^{(7–4)}, [10–6]
Win	13–12	Apr 2016	Spain F10, Majadahonda	Futures	Clay	(Spain) Georgi Rumenov Payakov	(Spain) Andrés Artuñedo Martínavarro (Spain) Ricardo Ojeda Lara	6–0, 6–1
Loss	13–13	Jun 2016	Tunisia F21, Hammamet	Futures	Clay	(Egypt) Karim-Mohamed Maamoun	(Colombia) Cristian Rodríguez (Italy) Walter Trusendi	3–6, 6–2, [7–10]
Loss	13–14	Nov 2016	Spain F36, Cuevas del Almanzora	Futures	Hard	(Spain) David Vega Hernández	(Spain) Javier Barranco Cosano (Italy) Raúl Brancaccio	3–6, 0–6
Loss	13–15	Nov 2016	Spain F37, Cuevas del Almanzora	Futures	Hard	(Spain) David Vega Hernández	(Spain) Jaume Pla Malfeito (Spain) Mario Vilella Martínez	6–7^{(4–7)}, 6–2, [5–10]
Loss	13–16	Dec 2016	Spain F39, Cuevas del Almanzora	Futures	Hard	(Spain) David Vega Hernández	(Republic of Ireland) Peter Bothwell (Japan) Akira Santillan	2–6, 7–5, [2–10]
Win	14–16	Mar 2017	Portugal F3, Loulé	Futures	Hard	(Spain) David Vega Hernández	(Spain) Carlos Gómez-Herrera (United Kingdom) Nikki Roenn	6–4, 7–5
Win	15–16	Apr 2017	Spain F10, Madrid	Futures	Hard	(Spain) Carlos Boluda-Purkiss	(Spain) Carlos Gómez-Herrera (Spain) Juan Lizariturry	7–6^{(8–6)}, 6–3
Loss	15–17	Apr 2017	Portugal F6, Porto	Futures	Clay	(Spain) David Vega Hernández	(Portugal) João Monteiro (Brazil) Bruno Sant'Anna	6–4, 3–6, [8–10]
Win	16–17	May 2017	Bulgaria F1, Sozopol	Futures	Hard	(Czech Republic) Michal Konečný	(Romania) Victor-Mugurel Anagnastopol (Romania) Victor Vlad Cornea	4–6, 7–5, [11–9]
Win	17–17	Jul 2017	Spain F19, Bakio	Futures	Hard	(Spain) David Vega Hernández	(Spain) Carlos Gómez-Herrera (Spain) Juan Lizariturry	6–3, 6–2
Win	18–17	Jul 2017	Portugal F11, Póvoa de Varzim	Futures	Hard	(Australia) Alex de Minaur	(Australia) Edward Bourchier (Australia) Daniel Nolan	6–2, 6–1
Loss	18–18	Aug 2017	Segovia, Spain	Challenger	Hard	(Spain) David Vega Hernández	(Spain) Adrián Menéndez Maceiras (Ukraine) Sergiy Stakhovsky	6–4, 3–6, [7–10]
Win	19–18	Nov 2017	Egypt F34, Sharm El Sheikh	Futures	Hard	(Ukraine) Vladyslav Manafov	(Turkey) Tuna Altuna (Turkey) Cem İlkel	6–3, 6–4
Win	20–18	Mar 2018	Portugal F3, Loulé	Futures	Hard	(Spain) David Vega Hernández	(Austria) Maximilian Neuchrist (Austria) David Pichler	4–6, 6–4, [10–3]
Win	21–18	Sep 2019	M25 Tavira, Portugal	World Tennis Tour	Hard	(Spain) Alberto Barroso Campos	(Portugal) Francisco Cabral (United Kingdom) Luke Johnson	6–4, 6–4
Loss	21–19	Jul 2021	M25 Bakio, Spain	World Tennis Tour	Hard	(Spain) Adrián Menéndez Maceiras	(Spain) Iñaki Montes de la Torre (Spain) Antonio Prat	2–6, 6–4, [6−10]
Loss	21–20	Jul 2021	Iași, Romania	Challenger	Clay	(Argentina) Hernán Casanova	(Brazil) Orlando Luz (Brazil) Felipe Meligeni Rodrigues Alves	3–6, 4–6
Win	22–20	Sep 2021	M25 Madrid, Spain	World Tennis Tour	Clay	(Spain) Carlos Sánchez Jover	(Argentina) Juan Ignacio Galarza (Argentina) Mariano Kestelboim	6–4, 6–2
Loss	22–21	Oct 2021	M25 Quinta do Lago, Portugal	World Tennis Tour	Hard	(Spain) Alberto Barroso Campos	(United Kingdom) Evan Hoyt (Tunisia) Skander Mansouri	6–4, 3–6, [5−10]
