= Fabrice Martin =

French tennis player (born 1986)

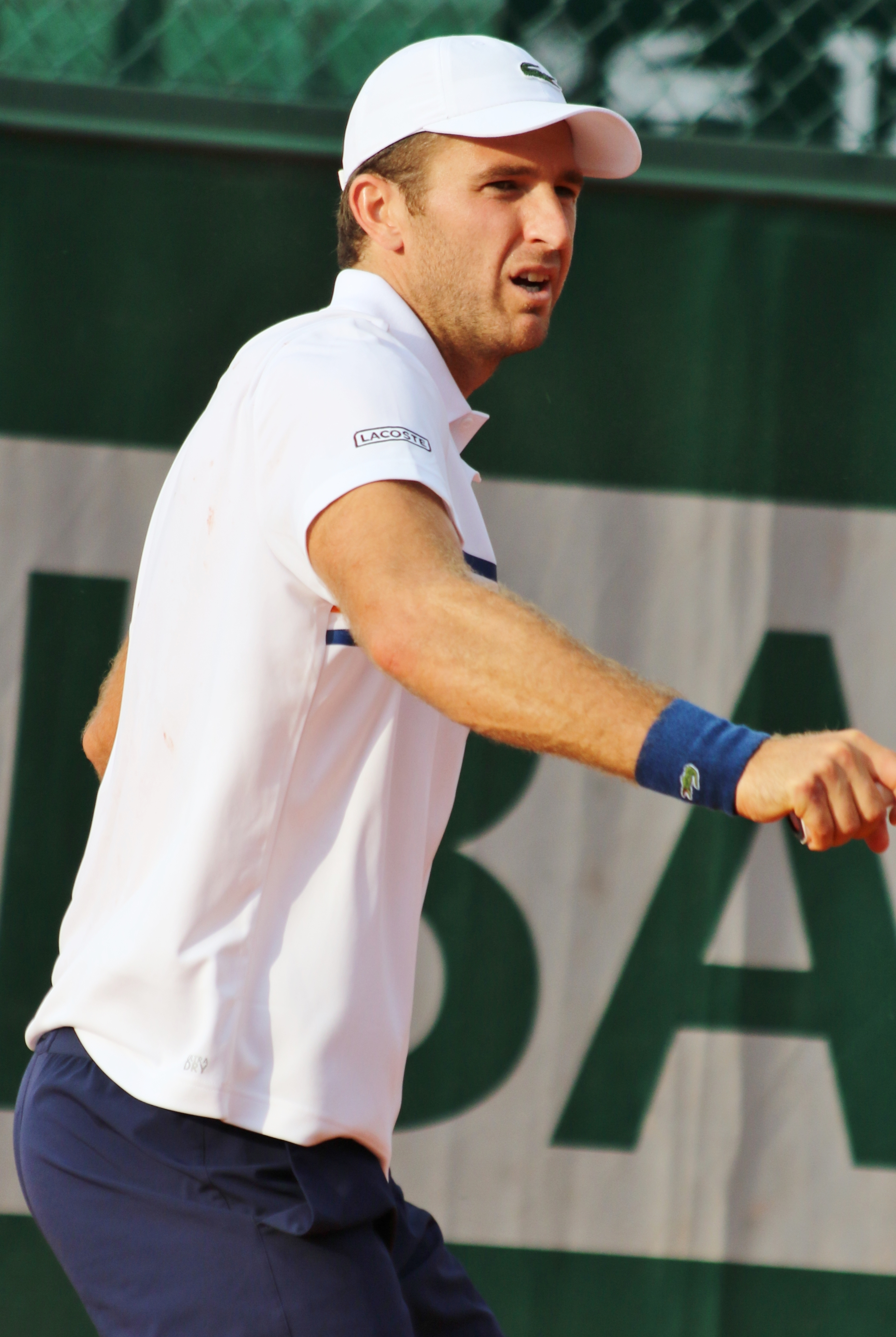
- Fabrice Martin at the 2018 French Open
- Country (sports): France
- Residence: Bradenton, Florida, United States
- Born: 11 September 1986 (age 39) Bayonne, France
- Height: 1.98 m (6 ft 6 in)
- Turned pro: 2006
- Retired: 2026
- Plays: Right-handed (one-handed backhand)
- Coach: Paul Forsyth
- Prize money: US $2,511,085

Singles
- Career record: 0–2
- Career titles: 0
- Highest ranking: No. 228 (23 July 2012)

Grand Slam singles results
- Australian Open: Q1 (2012)
- French Open: Q1 (2012)

Doubles
- Career record: 238–234
- Career titles: 8
- Highest ranking: No. 19 (24 April 2023)

Grand Slam doubles results
- Australian Open: SF (2023)
- French Open: F (2019)
- Wimbledon: 3R (2016, 2021)
- US Open: 3R (2017, 2018, 2019)

Mixed doubles
- Career record: 1–3
- Career titles: 0

Grand Slam mixed doubles results
- Australian Open: 2R (2017)
- French Open: QF (2023)
- Wimbledon: 2R (2019, 2021, 2024)
- US Open: QF (2019, 2021)

Fabrice Martin (French pronunciation: [fabʁis maʁtɛ̃]; born 11 September 1986) is a French former professional tennis player and coach. He reached a career-high ATP singles ranking of world No. 228 on 23 July 2012, and his highest ATP doubles ranking of world No. 19 on 24 April 2023.

== Career ==
=== 2019: French Open doubles finalist ===
He reached the final of his home Major of the 2019 French Open – Men's doubles with Jeremy Chardy but lost to German duo Andreas Mies and Kevin Krawietz. Martin and Chardy were the fourth all-French team to reach the French Open men's doubles final, in seven years, since 2013. None of the four finalists had previously contested a major men's doubles final, and neither team was seeded for the tournament.

=== 2020: Top 25 debut, Italian Open finalist ===
Martin and Chardy reached the final of the 2020 Italian Open – Men's doubles but lost to Marcel Granollers and Horacio Zeballos.

=== 2021: Second Paris Masters quarterfinal ===
He reached his second quarterfinal at his home 2021 Rolex Paris Masters with Andreas Mies having reached that stage of this tournament in 2019 with Jeremy Chardy.

=== 2022: Third ATP 500 doubles final ===
At the 2022 Astana Open he reached the doubles final with compatriot Adrian Mannarino defeating top seeds Tim Pütz/Michael Venus, and Polish duo Hubert Hurkacz/Jan Zielinski in the semifinals. They lost to Croatian duo and second seeds Nikola Mektic/Mate Pavic in the final.

=== 2023: Australian Open semifinal, ATP 500 title, top 20 ===
At the start of the year he reached the semifinals of the Australian Open partnering Jérémy Chardy. Martin also won his first ATP 500 doubles title in Dubai with Maxime Cressy defeating third seeds Harri Heliövaara and Lloyd Glasspool.

=== 2024-2026: Hiatus, coaching, retirement ===
Following a hiatus due to injury, Martin started coaching compatriot Ugo Humbert in December 2024. They split at the end of August 2025.

Martin made his comeback on the professional tour at the 2026 Australian Open in doubles, but was defeated in the first round. He announced his retirement from professional tennis in May 2026, with his final appearance at the 2026 French Open partnering Adrian Mannarino.

== Grand Slam finals ==
=== Doubles: 1 (1 runner-up) ===
Result	Year	Championship	Surface	Partner	Opponents	Score
Loss	2019	French Open	Clay	(France) Jérémy Chardy	(Germany) Kevin Krawietz (Germany) Andreas Mies	2–6, 6–7^{(3–7)}

== Masters 1000 finals ==
=== Doubles: 1 (1 runner-up) ===
Result	Year	Tournament	Surface	Partner	Opponents	Score
Loss	2020	Italian Open	Clay	(France) Jérémy Chardy	(Spain) Marcel Granollers (Argentina) Horacio Zeballos	4–6, 7–5, [8–10]

== ATP Tour finals ==
=== Doubles: 22 (8 titles, 14 runner-ups) ===
Legend Grand Slam tournaments (0–1) ATP World Tour Finals (0–0) ATP World Tour Masters 1000 (0–1) ATP World Tour 500 Series (1–3) ATP World Tour 250 Series (7–9)	Titles by surface Hard (7–9) Clay (1–4) Grass (0–1)	Titles by setting Outdoor (5–8) Indoor (2–6)

Result	W–L	Date	Tournament	Tier	Surface	Partner	Opponents	Score
Loss	0–1	Feb 2015	Zagreb Indoors, Croatia	250 Series	Hard (i)	(India) Purav Raja	(Croatia) Marin Draganja (Finland) Henri Kontinen	4–6, 4–6
Win	1–1	Jan 2016	Chennai Open, India	250 Series	Hard	(Austria) Oliver Marach	(United States) Austin Krajicek (France) Benoît Paire	6–3, 7–5
Win	2–1	Feb 2016	Delray Beach Open, United States	250 Series	Hard	(Austria) Oliver Marach	(United States) Bob Bryan (United States) Mike Bryan	3–6, 7–6^{(9–7)}, [13–11]
Loss	2–2	Jun 2016	MercedesCup, Germany	250 Series	Grass	(Austria) Oliver Marach	(New Zealand) Marcus Daniell (New Zealand) Artem Sitak	7–6^{(7–4)}, 4–6, [8–10]
Loss	2–3	Oct 2016	Shenzhen Open, China	250 Series	Hard	(Austria) Oliver Marach	(Italy) Fabio Fognini (Sweden) Robert Lindstedt	6–7^{(4–7)}, 3–6
Loss	2–4	Oct 2016	Vienna Open, Austria	500 Series	Hard (i)	(Austria) Oliver Marach	(Poland) Łukasz Kubot (Brazil) Marcelo Melo	6–4, 3–6, [11–13]
Win	3–4	Jan 2017	Qatar Open, Qatar	250 Series	Hard	(France) Jérémy Chardy	(Canada) Vasek Pospisil (Czech Republic) Radek Štěpánek	6–4, 7–6^{(7–3)}
Loss	3–5	Feb 2017	Open Sud de France, France	250 Series	Hard (i)	(Canada) Daniel Nestor	(Germany) Alexander Zverev (Germany) Mischa Zverev	4–6, 7–6^{(7–3)}, [7–10]
Loss	3–6	May 2017	Bavarian Championships, Germany	250 Series	Clay	(France) Jérémy Chardy	(Colombia) Juan Sebastián Cabal (Colombia) Robert Farah	3–6, 3–6
Loss	3–7	Oct 2017	Swiss Indoors, Switzerland	500 Series	Hard (i)	(France) Édouard Roger-Vasselin	(Croatia) Ivan Dodig (Spain) Marcel Granollers	5–7, 6–7^{(6–8)}
Win	4–7	Feb 2019	Open 13, France	250 Series	Hard (i)	(France) Jérémy Chardy	(Japan) Ben McLachlan (Netherlands) Matwé Middelkoop	6–3, 6–7^{(4–7)}, [10–3]
Win	5–7	May 2019	Estoril Open, Portugal	250 Series	Clay	(France) Jérémy Chardy	(United Kingdom) Luke Bambridge (United Kingdom) Jonny O'Mara	7–5, 7–6^{(7–3)}
Loss	5–8	Jun 2019	French Open, France	Grand Slam	Clay	(France) Jérémy Chardy	(Germany) Kevin Krawietz (Germany) Andreas Mies	2–6, 6–7^{(3–7)}
Loss	5–9	Oct 2019	Chengdu Open, China	250 Series	Hard	(Israel) Jonathan Erlich	(Serbia) Nikola Čačić (Serbia) Dušan Lajović	6–7^{(9–11)}, 6–3, [3–10]
Win	6–9	Jan 2020	Adelaide International, Australia	250 Series	Hard	(Argentina) Máximo González	(Croatia) Ivan Dodig (Slovakia) Filip Polášek	7–6^{(14–12)}, 6–3
Loss	6–10	Sep 2020	Italian Open, Italy	Masters 1000	Clay	(France) Jérémy Chardy	(Spain) Marcel Granollers (Argentina) Horacio Zeballos	4–6, 7–5, [8–10]
Loss	6–11	Feb 2021	Murray River Open, Australia	250 Series	Hard	(France) Jérémy Chardy	(Croatia) Nikola Mektić (Croatia) Mate Pavić	6–7^{(2–7)}, 3–6
Win	7–11	Oct 2021	European Open, Belgium	250 Series	Hard (i)	(France) Nicolas Mahut	(Netherlands) Wesley Koolhof (Netherlands) Jean-Julien Rojer	6–0, 6–1
Loss	7–12	Oct 2022	Astana Open, Kazakhstan	500 Series	Hard (i)	(France) Adrian Mannarino	(Croatia) Nikola Mektić (Croatia) Mate Pavić	4–6, 2–6
Loss	7–13	Feb 2023	Open 13, France	250 Series	Hard (i)	(France) Nicolas Mahut	(Mexico) Santiago González (France) Édouard Roger-Vasselin	6–4, 6–7^{(4–7)}, [7–10]
Win	8–13	Feb 2023	Dubai Tennis Championships, UAE	500 Series	Hard	(United States) Maxime Cressy	(United Kingdom) Lloyd Glasspool (Finland) Harri Heliövaara	7–6^{(7–2)}, 6–4
Loss	8–14	Jul 2024	Swiss Open Gstaad, Switzerland	250 Series	Clay	(France) Ugo Humbert	(India) Yuki Bhambri (France) Albano Olivetti	6–3, 3–6, [6–10]

== ATP Challenger and ITF Tour finals ==
=== Singles: 15 (6–9) ===
Legend (singles) ATP Challenger Tour (1–2) ITF Futures Tour (5–7)	Titles by surface Hard (5–6) Clay (0–0) Grass (0–0) Carpet (1–3)

Result	W–L	Date	Tournament	Tier	Surface	Opponent	Score
Win	1–0	Aug 2008	Venezuela F6, Valencia	Futures	Hard	(Venezuela) Roberto Maytín	7–5, 6–4
Loss	1–1	Oct 2008	Mexico F13, Ciudad Obregón	Futures	Hard	(Mexico) César Ramírez	2–6, 4–6
Loss	1–2	Mar 2010	China F1, Kaiyuan	Futures	Hard	(Italy) Riccardo Ghedin	3–6, 4–6
Loss	1–3	Jul 2010	Norway F2, Gausdal	Futures	Hard	(Switzerland) Alexander Sadecky	5–7, 3–6
Win	2–3	Jul 2010	Spain F24, Bakio	Futures	Hard	(Israel) Amir Weintraub	6–3, 6–4
Loss	2–4	Feb 2011	France F2, Feucherolles	Futures	Hard (i)	(Spain) Arnau Brugués Davi	6–2, 3–6, 5–7
Loss	2–5	Mar 2011	Switzerland F2, Vaduz	Futures	Carpet (i)	(Austria) Johannes Ager	6–3, 3–6, 6–7^{(5–7)}
Win	3–5	Jul 2011	Recanati, Italy	Challenger	Hard	(France) Kenny de Schepper	6–1, 6–7^{(5–7)}, 7–6^{(7–3)}
Loss	3–6	Jul 2012	Recanati, Italy	Challenger	Hard	(Italy) Simone Bolelli	3–6, 2–6
Win	4–6	Oct 2012	France F2, Rodez	Futures	Hard (i)	(Belgium) Maxime Authom	6–3, 6–2
Loss	4–7	Jan 2013	Germany F1, Schwieberdingen	Futures	Carpet (i)	(Latvia) Andis Juška	4–6, 4–6
Win	5–7	Mar 2013	France F6, Saint-Raphaël	Futures	Hard (i)	(France) David Guez	6–3, 6–2
Win	6–7	Jan 2014	Germany F1, Schwieberdingen	Futures	Carpet (i)	(Germany) Bastian Knittel	4–6, 7–5, 6–3
Loss	6–8	May 2014	Portugal F4, Termas de Monfortinho	Futures	Carpet	(Spain) David Vega Hernández	7–5, 6–7^{(2–7)}, 3–6
Loss	6–9	Jul 2014	Granby, Canada	Challenger	Hard	(Japan) Hiroki Moriya	5–7, 7–6^{(7–5)}, 3–6

=== Doubles: 54 (31–23) ===
Legend (doubles) ATP Challenger Tour (7–9) ITF Futures Tour (24–14)	Titles by surface Hard (24–18) Clay (4–3) Grass (1–1) Carpet (2–1)

Result	W–L	Date	Tournament	Tier	Surface	Partner	Opponents	Score
Loss	0–1	Aug 2007	Great Britain F13, Ilkley	Futures	Grass	(New Zealand) Daniel King-Turner	(United Kingdom) Ian Flanagan (Australia) Brydan Klein	3–6, 1–6
Win	1–1	Jun 2008	Norway F1, Gausdal	Futures	Hard	(United States) Lance Vodicka	(Denmark) Thomas Kromann (Brazil) Renato Silveira	1–6, 6–3, [10–7]
Win	2–1	Jun 2008	Norway F3, Oslo	Futures	Clay	(United States) Lance Vodicka	(Italy) Fabio Colangelo (Italy) Luca Vanni	w/o
Win	3–1	Aug 2008	Ecuador F2, Guayaquil	Futures	Hard	(United States) Shane La Porte	(Venezuela) Luis David Martínez (Venezuela) Roberto Maytín	7–6^{(10–8)}, 3–6, [10–7]
Win	4–1	Oct 2008	Mexico F12, Mazatlán	Futures	Hard	(Canada) Adil Shamasdin	(Mexico) Luis Díaz Barriga (Mexico) Daniel Garza	w/o
Win	5–1	Oct 2008	Mexico F13, Ciudad Obregón	Futures	Hard	(Canada) Adil Shamasdin	(United States) Christopher Klingemann (Canada) Milan Pokrajac	3–6, 6–4, [10–7]
Loss	5–2	Jun 2009	Norway F1, Svingvoll	Futures	Hard	(United States) Michael McClune	(Finland) Henri Kontinen (Finland) Timo Nieminen	3–6, 3–6
Loss	5–3	Jul 2009	France F11, Bourg-en-Bresse	Futures	Clay	(Canada) Adil Shamasdin	(Austria) Andreas Haider-Maurer (Germany) Bastian Knittel	6–3, 5–7, [4–10]
Win	6–3	Jul 2009	France F12, Saint-Gervais	Futures	Clay	(Canada) Adil Shamasdin	(France) Baptiste Dupuy (France) Pierrick Ysern	6–2, 6–4
Loss	6–4	Sep 2009	France F13, Bagnères-de-Bigorre	Futures	Hard	(Canada) Adil Shamasdin	(China) Gong Maoxin (China) Zhang Ze	4–6, 4–6
Loss	6–5	Oct 2009	France F19, La Roche-sur-Yon	Futures	Hard (i)	(Canada) Adil Shamasdin	(Belgium) Niels Desein (Canada) Pierre-Ludovic Duclos	6–7^{(6–8)}, 6–1, [5–10]
Loss	6–6	Oct 2009	France F20, Rodez	Futures	Hard (i)	(Canada) Adil Shamasdin	(France) Jérémy Blandin (France) Vincent Stouff	7–6^{(7–4)}, 6–7^{(5–7)}, [3–10]
Win	7–6	Jan 2010	Spain F3, Murcia	Futures	Hard	(France) Jérémy Blandin	(Spain) Agustín Boje-Ordóñez (Spain) Ignacio Coll Riudavets	6–2, 4–6, [10–8]
Win	8–6	Feb 2010	France F3, Bressuire	Futures	Hard (i)	(France) Jérémy Blandin	(France) Marc Auradou (France) Antoine Tassart	4–6, 6–2, [10–3]
Loss	8–7	Jun 2010	Norway F1, Gausdal	Futures	Hard	(Italy) Riccardo Ghedin	(Finland) Harri Heliövaara (Finland) Juho Paukku	6–2, 4–6, [5–10]
Win	9–7	Sep 2010	USA F24, Costa Mesa	Futures	Hard	(Mexico) Daniel Garza	(Philippines) Ruben Gonzales (United States) Robbye Poole	6–4, 6–2
Win	10–7	Oct 2010	France F18, Saint-Dizier	Futures	Hard (i)	(France) Julien Maes	(France) Kenny de Schepper (France) Albano Olivetti	2–6, 6–4, [10–4]
Win	11–7	Nov 2010	Israel F5, Tel Aviv	Futures	Hard	(France) Rudy Coco	(Germany) Kevin Krawietz (Russia) Sergei Krotiouk	6–3, 6–4
Win	12–7	Feb 2011	France F2, Feucherolles	Futures	Hard (i)	(Italy) Riccardo Ghedin	(France) Gleb Sakharov (France) Vincent Stouff	6–3, 6–2
Win	13–7	Mar 2011	France F5, Poitiers	Futures	Hard (i)	(France) Romain Jouan	(France) Kenny de Schepper (France) Julien Obry	7–6^{(7–5)}, 6–4
Win	14–7	Mar 2011	Switzerland F2, Vaduz	Futures	Carpet (i)	(Republic of Ireland) James Cluskey	(Poland) Piotr Gadomski (Netherlands) Tim van Terheijden	7–6^{(7–2)}, 6–4
Win	15–7	Jun 2011	France F9, Toulon	Futures	Clay	(France) Jonathan Eysseric	(France) Julien Obry (France) Adrien Puget	6–3, 7–6^{(7–2)}
Loss	15–8	Jul 2011	France F10, Montauban	Futures	Clay	(France) Alexandre Sidorenko	(France) Pierre-Hugues Herbert (France) Nicolas Renavand	4–6, 4–6
Win	16–8	Jul 2011	Great Britain F10, Frinton	Futures	Grass	(France) Julien Maes	(United Kingdom) Chris Eaton (United Kingdom) Josh Goodall	7–5, 7–6^{(7–2)}
Loss	16–9	Sep 2011	France F14, Mulhouse	Futures	Hard (i)	(Republic of Ireland) James Cluskey	(France) Pierre-Hugues Herbert (France) Albano Olivetti	3–6, 4–6
Win	17–9	Mar 2012	France F4, Lille	Futures	Hard (i)	(France) Romain Jouan	(Germany) Nils Langer (Austria) Philipp Oswald	6–2, 6–2
Win	18–9	Jun 2012	Spain F18, Palma del Río	Futures	Hard	(Republic of Ireland) James Cluskey	(Spain) Gerard Granollers-Pujol (Spain) Andoni Vivanco-Guzmán	6–3, 6–4
Win	19–9	Jul 2012	Spain F19, Bakio	Futures	Hard	(Australia) Brydan Klein	(Spain) Juan-Samuel Arauzo-Martínez (Spain) Íñigo Santos-Fernández	7–5, 6–1
Win	20–9	Sep 2012	France F15, Bagnères-de-Bigorre	Futures	Hard	(Republic of Ireland) James Cluskey	(France) Charles-Antoine Brézac (France) Simon Cauvard	6–7^{(4–7)}, 7–5, [11–9]
Win	21–9	Jul 2013	Istanbul, Turkey	Challenger	Hard	(Republic of Ireland) James Cluskey	(United Kingdom) Brydan Klein (South Africa) Ruan Roelofse	3–6, 6–3, [10–5]
Loss	21–10	Aug 2013	Belarus F1, Minsk	Futures	Hard	(France) Jules Marie	(Belarus) Yaraslav Shyla (Belarus) Andrei Vasilevski	4–6, 6–7^{(2–7)}
Win	22–10	Aug 2013	Belarus F2, Minsk	Futures	Hard	(Republic of Ireland) James Cluskey	(Moldova) Andrei Ciumac (Ukraine) Volodymyr Uzhylovskyi	6–3, 6–4
Win	23–10	Oct 2013	Mouilleron-le-Captif, France	Challenger	Hard (i)	(France) Hugo Nys	(Finland) Henri Kontinen (Spain) Adrián Menéndez Maceiras	3–6, 6–3, [10–8]
Loss	23–11	Oct 2013	France F21, Rodez	Futures	Hard (i)	(France) Antoine Benneteau	(Germany) Gero Kretschmer (Germany) Alexander Satschko	4–6, 6–7^{(4–7)}
Loss	23–12	Dec 2013	Turkey F49, Antalya	Futures	Hard	(France) Julien Obry	(Russia) Andrei Plotniy (Ukraine) Artem Smirnov	3–6, 4–6
Loss	23–13	Feb 2014	Italy F2, Rovereto	Futures	Carpet (i)	(France) Hugo Nys	(Italy) Marco Crugnola (Italy) Luca Vanni	4–6, 4–6
Win	24–13	Mar 2014	Italy F3, Trento	Futures	Hard (i)	(Germany) Kevin Krawietz	(Poland) Błażej Koniusz (Italy) Matteo Volante	6–3, 6–1
Loss	24–14	Mar 2014	France F7, Saint-Raphaël	Futures	Hard (i)	(France) Hugo Nys	(Monaco) Romain Arneodo (Monaco) Benjamin Balleret	2–6, 6–7^{(2–7)}
Win	25–14	May 2014	Portugal F4, Termas de Monfortinho	Futures	Carpet	(Australia) Jordan Kerr	(Portugal) Romain Barbosa (Portugal) Frederico Ferreira Silva	6–2, 6–7^{(3–7)}, [10–4]
Loss	25–15	Jun 2014	Nanchang, China, P.R.	Challenger	Hard	(Australia) Jordan Kerr	(Chinese Taipei) Chen Ti (Chinese Taipei) Peng Hsien-yin	2–6, 6–3, [10–12]
Loss	25–16	Jul 2014	Granby, Canada	Challenger	Hard	(Australia) Jordan Kerr	(New Zealand) Marcus Daniell (New Zealand) Artem Sitak	6–7^{(5–7)}, 7–5, [5–10]
Loss	25–17	Sep 2014	Istanbul, Turkey	Challenger	Hard	(Australia) Jordan Kerr	(United Kingdom) Colin Fleming (United Kingdom) Jonathan Marray	4–6, 6–2, [8–10]
Loss	25–18	Nov 2014	Reunion Island, Reunion	Challenger	Hard	(France) Jonathan Eysseric	(Netherlands) Robin Haase (Croatia) Mate Pavić	5–7, 6–4, [7–10]
Win	26–18	Jan 2015	France F2, Bressuire	Futures	Hard (i)	(India) Purav Raja	(United States) Kevin King (United Kingdom) David Rice	6–3, 6–2
Loss	26–19	Mar 2015	Guangzhou, China, P.R.	Challenger	Hard	(India) Purav Raja	(Spain) Daniel Muñoz de la Nava (Kazakhstan) Aleksandr Nedovyesov	2–6, 5–7
Win	27–19	Aug 2015	Portorož, Slovenia	Challenger	Hard	(India) Purav Raja	(Belarus) Aliaksandr Bury (Sweden) Andreas Siljeström	7–6^{(7–5)}, 4–6, [18–16]
Win	28–19	Sep 2015	Szczecin, Poland	Challenger	Clay	(France) Tristan Lamasine	(Italy) Alessandro Giannessi (Italy) Federico Gaio	6–3, 7–6^{(7–4)}
Win	29–19	Oct 2015	Orléans, France	Challenger	Hard (i)	(France) Tristan Lamasine	(United Kingdom) Ken Skupski (United Kingdom) Neal Skupski	6–4, 7–6^{(7–2)}
Loss	29–20	Mar 2017	Irving, USA	Challenger	Hard	(Austria) Oliver Marach	(New Zealand) Marcus Daniell (Brazil) Marcelo Demoliner	3–6, 4–6
Loss	29–21	Sep 2018	Cary, USA	Challenger	Hard	(France) Hugo Nys	(United States) Evan King (United States) Hunter Reese	4–6, 6–7^{(6–8)}
Win	30–21	Feb 2019	Quimper, France	Challenger	Hard (i)	(France) Hugo Nys	(Netherlands) David Pel (Croatia) Antonio Šančić	6–4, 6–2
Loss	30–22	Mar 2019	Lille, France	Challenger	Hard	(Israel) Jonathan Erlich	(Monaco) Romain Arneodo (France) Hugo Nys	5–7, 7–5, [8–10]
Win	31–22	Mar 2019	Saint Brieuc, France	Challenger	Hard (i)	(Israel) Jonathan Erlich	(France) Jonathan Eysseric (Croatia) Antonio Šančić	7–6^{(7–2)}, 7–6^{(7–2)}
Loss	31–23	May 2019	Heilbronn, Germany	Challenger	Clay	(Germany) Andre Begemann	(Germany) Andreas Mies (Germany) Kevin Krawietz	2–6, 4–6

== World TeamTennis ==
Martin has played four seasons with World TeamTennis, making his debut with the Philadelphia Freedoms in 2016. Martin was named 2016 WTT Male Rookie of the Year playing for the Philadelphia Freedoms. He was tied for first in the league with teammate Naomi Broady in winning percentage in mixed doubles and was also fourth in men's doubles. He played for the Freedoms 2016–2019, and it has been announced that he will be joining the Philadelphia Freedoms during the 2020 WTT season set to begin 12 July.

Martin paired up with Taylor Townsend for mixed doubles and the combination of Taylor Fritz and Donald Young in men's doubles. The Freedoms earned the No. 1 seed in WTT Playoffs, but would ultimately fall to the New York Empire, who went on to win the Championship, in the semifinals.

== Performance timelines ==
Key
W	F	SF	QF	#R	RR	Q#	DNQ	A	NH

(W) winner; (F) finalist; (SF) semifinalist; (QF) quarterfinalist; (#R) rounds 4, 3, 2, 1; (RR) round-robin stage; (Q#) qualification round; (DNQ) did not qualify; (A) absent; (NH) not held; (SR) strike rate (events won / competed); (W–L) win–loss record.
To avoid confusion and double counting, these charts are updated at the conclusion of a tournament or when the player's participation has ended.

=== Doubles ===
Tournament	2013	2014	2015	2016	2017	2018	2019	2020	2021	2022	2023	2024	…	2026	SR	W–L	Win%
Grand Slam tournaments
Australian Open	A	A	A	2R	2R	3R	2R	2R	1R	1R	SF	A		1R	0 / 9	10–9	53%
French Open	1R	1R	A	2R	1R	1R	F	3R	2R	2R	1R	1R			0 / 11	10–11	48%
Wimbledon	A	A	1R	3R	2R	1R	2R	NH	3R	2R	2R	2R			0 / 9	9–9	50%
US Open	A	A	2R	2R	3R	3R	3R	1R	2R	1R	1R	2R			0 / 10	10–10	50%
Win–loss	0–1	0–1	1–2	5–4	4–4	4–4	9–4	3–3	4–4	2–4	5–4	2–3		0–1	0 / 39	39–39	50%

=== Mixed doubles ===
Tournament	2016	2017	2018	2019	2020	2021	2022	SR	W–L	Win%
Grand Slam tournaments
Australian Open	A	2R	1R	A	1R	1R	1R	0 / 5	1–5	17%
French Open	2R	1R	A	1R	NH	A	1R	0 / 4	1–4	20%
Wimbledon	1R	2R	2R	2R	NH	2R	A	0 / 5	3–5	38%
US Open	1R	2R	A	QF	NH	QF	A	0 / 4	5–4	56%
Win–loss	1–3	3–4	1–2	3–3	0–1	2–3	0–2	0 / 18	10–18	36%
