= Andrés Artuñedo =

Spanish tennis player (born 1993)

- Full name: Andrés Artuñedo Martínavarro
- Country (sports): Spain
- Born: 14 September 1993 (age 32) Castellón de la Plana, Spain
- Height: 6'0 (183 cm)
- Turned pro: 2010
- Plays: Right-handed (two-handed backhand)
- Coach: Alex Bragado / Joaquín Monso
- Prize money: $119,091

Singles
- Career record: 0-1 (ATP Tour level, Grand Slam level, and Davis Cup)
- Career titles: 0; 0 Challenger, 14 Futures
- Highest ranking: No. 293 (3 March 2014)

Doubles
- Career record: 0-0 (ATP Tour level, Grand Slam level, and Davis Cup)
- Career titles: 0; 1 Challenger, 8 Futures
- Highest ranking: No. 267 (24 June 2019)

Andrés Artuñedo Martínavarro (born 14 September 1993), known as Andrés Artuñedo (Spanish pronunciation: [anˈdɾes aɾtuˈɲeðo]), is a tennis player from Spain.

Artuñedo has reached a career high ATP singles ranking of World No. 293 achieved on 3 March 2014. He has also reached a career high ATP doubles ranking of World No. 267 achieved on 24 June 2019.

Artuñedo, with partner Roberto Carballés won the Boys' Doubles event on the 2011 French Open. They defeated Mitchell Krueger and Shane Vinsant 5–7, 7–6, [10–5] in the final. He was the top climber of 2011 ATP rankings starting in number 1182 and finishing 486th.

Artuñedo made his ATP Tour singles debut at the 2014 Open Sud de France on hard courts in Montpellier. Granted acceptance into the qualifying draw, he defeated Alessandro Bega 6–3 6–7^{(7–4)}, followed by Niels Desein 6–4, 3–6, 7–6^{(7–4)} and lastly Vincent Millot 3–6, 7–6^{(7–1)}, 6–3 to earn a main draw birth. In the first round, he faced French wild card Pierre-Hugues Herbert and was defeated in straight sets 4–6, 3–6.

Artuñedo had reached 23 career singles finals with a record of 14 wins and 9 losses all appearing on hard courts on the ITF Futures Tour. Additionally, he has reached 17 career doubles finals with a record of 9 wins and 8 losses, with includes a 1–0 record in ATP Challenger Tour finals which represents his title victory at the 2018 Segovia Challenger in Spain where alongside David Pérez Sanz they defeated Matías Franco Descotte and Joao Monteiro 6–7^{(3–7)}, 6–3, [10–6] to capture the championship.

== ATP Challenger and ITF Futures finals ==
=== Singles: 23 (14–9) ===
Legend ATP Challenger (0–0) ITF Futures (14–9)	Finals by surface Hard (14–9) Clay (0–0) Grass (0–0) Carpet (0–0)

Result	W–L	Date	Tournament	Tier	Surface	Opponent	Score
Loss	0–1	Jun 2011	Spain F7, Martos	Futures	Hard	(Spain) Arnau Brugués Davi	2–6, 3–6
Win	1–1	Sep 2011	Spain F33, Madrid	Futures	Hard	(Spain) José Checa Calvo	6–2, 1–0 ret.
Win	2–1	Sep 2011	Spain F34, Madrid	Futures	Hard	(Russia) Aleksandr Lobkov	3–6, 6–1, 3–0 ret.
Loss	2–2	Sep 2012	Spain F29, Madrid	Futures	Hard	(Italy) Roberto Marcora	3–6, 6–7^{(3–7)}
Win	3–2	Apr 2013	Greece F2, Heraklion	Futures	Hard	(Spain) Carlos Gómez-Herrera	6–3, 7–6^{(7–2)}
Loss	3–3	Aug 2013	Spain F25, Bejar	Futures	Hard	(Spain) José Checa Calvo	0–4 ret.
Win	4–3	Sep 2013	Spain F28, Pozoblanco	Futures	Hard	(Spain) David Pérez Sanz	6–7^{(6–8)}, 6–0, 6–1
Win	5–3	Feb 2014	Portugal F3, Faro	Futures	Hard	(France) Tristan Lamasine	6–4, 6–2
Win	6–3	Sep 2015	Spain F29, Madrid	Futures	Hard	(Spain) Jaime Pulgar-Garcia	6–0, 2–0 ret.
Win	7–3	Aug 2016	Spain F24, Bejar	Futures	Hard	(Belgium) Yannick Mertens	6–2, 7–6^{(7–4)}
Win	8–3	Aug 2016	Spain F25, Ourense	Futures	Hard	(Norway) Viktor Durasovic	6–3, 6–2
Loss	8–4	Oct 2016	Spain F33, Madrid	Futures	Hard	(Spain) Carlos Gómez-Herrera	4–6, 3–6
Loss	8–5	Apr 2017	Greece F4, Heraklion	Futures	Hard	(Austria) Lenny Hampel	2–6, 2–6
Loss	8–6	Jul 2017	Portugal F13, Idanha-a-Nova	Futures	Hard	(Portugal) Nuno Borges	6–7^{(4–7)}, 4–6
Win	9–6	Nov 2017	Greece F7, Heraklion	Futures	Hard	(Austria) Matthias Haim	6–2, 6–3
Win	10–6	Apr 2018	Egypt F13, Sharm El Sheikh	Futures	Hard	(Austria) Lucas Miedler	0–6, 7–6^{(9–7)}, 6–3
Win	11–6	May 2018	Tunisia F17, Jerba	Futures	Hard	(France) Maxime Tchoutakian	2–6, 7–5, 6–3
Loss	11–7	May 2018	Tunisia F18, Jerba	Futures	Hard	(France) David Guez	1–6, 1–6
Win	12–7	Sep 2018	France F17, Mulhouse	Futures	Hard	(France) Grégoire Jacq	7–6^{(8–6)}, 7–5
Win	13–7	Dec 2018	Czech Republic F12, Prague	Futures	Hard	(Czech Republic) Michal Konecny	6–1, 7–6^{(7–1)}
Loss	13–8	Mar 2019	M15 Sharm El Sheikh, Egypt	World Tennis Tour	Hard	(Egypt) Youssef Hossam	5–7, 3–6
Loss	13–9	Apr 2019	M25 Sunderland, Great Britain	World Tennis Tour	Hard	(Finland) Emil Ruusuvuori	2–6, 5–7
Win	14–9	Jun 2019	M25+H Palma del Rio, Spain	World Tennis Tour	Hard	(France) Arthur Rinderknech	6–7^{(2–7)}, 6–1, 6–4

=== Doubles: 17 (9–8) ===
Legend ATP Challenger (1–0) ITF Futures (8–8)	Finals by surface Hard (9–4) Clay (0–4) Grass (0–0) Carpet (0–0)

Result	W–L	Date	Tournament	Tier	Surface	Partner	Opponents	Score
Loss	0–1	Aug 2012	Finland F4, Vierumäki	Futures	Clay	(Spain) Juan Lizariturry	(Finland) Jesper Saami (Finland) Sami Huurinainen	6–7^{(4–7)}, 5–7
Loss	0–2	Jul 2013	Bulgaria F5, Stara Zagora	Futures	Clay	(Chile) Laslo Urrutia Fuentes	(Ukraine) Gleb Alekseenko (Russia) Alexander Igoshin	4–6, 6–4, [7–10]
Win	1–2	Aug 2015	Spain F25, Bejar	Futures	Hard	(Spain) Ricardo Ojeda Lara	(Spain) Ivan Arenas-Gualda (Spain) Jorge Hernando-Ruano	6–7^{(4–7)}, 6–3, [10–5]
Loss	1–3	Oct 2015	Spain F32, Sant Cugat del Vallès	Futures	Clay	(Canada) Steven Diez	(Spain) Sergio Martos (Spain) Pol Toledo Bagué	2–6, 3–6
Loss	1–4	Nov 2015	Cyprus F2, Limassol	Futures	Hard	(Canada) Steven Diez	(Cyprus) Petros Chrysochos (Croatia) Nino Serdarušić	6–1, 4–6, [3–10]
Loss	1–5	Dec 2015	Cyprus F3, Larnaca	Futures	Hard	(Canada) Steven Diez	(Greece) Konstantinos Economidis (Russia) Markos Kalovelonis	6–4, 3–6, [5–10]
Loss	1–6	Apr 2016	Spain F10, Majadahonda	Futures	Clay	(Spain) Ricardo Ojeda Lara	(Spain) Roberto Ortega Olmedo (Spain) Georgi Rumenov Payakov	0–6, 1–6
Win	2–6	May 2016	Spain F11, Móstoles	Futures	Hard	(Spain) Ricardo Ojeda Lara	(France) Elie Rousset (France) Joan Soler	6–4, 5–7, [10–4]
Win	3–6	Aug 2018	Segovia, Spain	Challenger	Hard	(Spain) David Pérez Sanz	(Argentina) Matías Franco Descotte (Portugal) Joao Monteiro	6–7^{(3–7)}, 6–3, [10–6]
Win	4–6	Aug 2018	Spain F22, Pozoblanco	Futures	Hard	(France) Mick Lescure	(United Kingdom) Evan Hoyt (Serbia) Darko Jandric	6–7^{(3–7)}, 6–4, [10–6]
Loss	4–7	Sep 2018	France F17, Mulhouse	Futures	Hard	(Colombia) Jose Daniel Bendeck	(Sweden) Christian Samuelsson (Sweden) Linus Frost	2–6, 1–6
Win	5–7	Oct 2018	France F22, Rodez	Futures	Hard	(Spain) Sergio Martos	(France) Pierre Faivre (France) Joffrey De Schepper	6–1, 6–4
Win	6–7	Mar 2019	M15 Sharm El Sheikh, Egypt	World Tennis Tour	Hard	(Spain) Pablo Vivero Gonzalez	(Czech Republic) David Poljak (Poland) Daniel Michalski	6–4, 6–4
Win	7–7	Mar 2019	M15 Sharm El Sheikh, Egypt	World Tennis Tour	Hard	(Spain) Pablo Vivero Gonzalez	(Ukraine) Vitaliy Sachko (Ukraine) Georgii Kravchenko	7–5, 5–7, [11–9]
Loss	7–8	May 2019	M15 Heraklion, Greece	World Tennis Tour	Hard	(Spain) Pablo Vivero Gonzalez	(Republic of Ireland) Peter Bothwell (United States) Henry Craig	6–4, 6–7^{(4–7)}, [4–10]
Win	8–8	Jun 2019	M15 Heraklion, Greece	World Tennis Tour	Hard	(Spain) Pablo Vivero Gonzalez	(Australia) Thomas Fancutt (Australia) Calum Puttergill	6–2, 6–2
Win	9–8	Aug 2019	M25+H Pozoblanco, Spain	World Tennis Tour	Hard	(Spain) Sergio Martos	(Colombia) Eduardo Struvay (France) Mick Lescure	7–6^{(7–4)}, 7–5

== Junior Grand Slam finals ==
=== Doubles: 1 (1 title) ===
Result	Year	Championship	Surface	Partner	Opponents	Score
Win	2011	French Open	Clay	(Spain) Roberto Carballés Baena	(United States) Mitchell Krueger (United States) Shane Vinsant	5–7, 7–6, [10–5]
