= Open de la Réunion =

- 2014 Open de la Réunion

Defunct tennis tournament
- Location: La Possession; Réunion
- Venue: Tennis Club Moulin Joli
- Category: ATP Challenger Tour
- Surface: Hard
- Draw: 32S/32Q/16D
- Prize money: €35,000+H
- Website: official website

The Open de la Réunion was a tennis tournament nominally held in Réunion in 2011 and in 2014.

== Past finals ==
=== Singles ===
Year	Champion	Runner-up	Score
2014	(Netherlands) Robin Haase	(France) Florent Serra	3-6, 6-1, 7-5
Not held 2012 and 2013
2011	Play cancelled due to heavy rain and flooding		

=== Doubles ===
Year	Champions	Runners-up	Score
2014	(Netherlands) Robin Haase (Croatia) Mate Pavić	(France) Jonathan Eysseric (France) Fabrice Martin	7-5, 4-6, [10-7]
Not held 2012 and 2013
2011	Play cancelled due to heavy rain and flooding		
