= James Cluskey =

Irish tennis player

- Country (sports): Ireland
- Residence: Dublin, Ireland
- Born: 18 August 1986 (age 39) Dublin, Ireland
- Height: 1.98 m (6 ft 6 in)
- Turned pro: 2009
- Plays: Right-handed (two-handed backhand)
- Prize money: $61,491

Singles
- Career record: 0–0
- Career titles: 0
- Highest ranking: No. 801 (5 November 2007)

Doubles
- Career record: 1–7
- Career titles: 0 ATP
- Highest ranking: No. 145 (9 September 2013)

James Cluskey (born 18 August 1986) is a retired Irish professional tennis player, mainly playing doubles. He was born in Dublin, Ireland and attended Belvedere College along with fellow Irish tennis player James McGee. Cluskey was, for some time, the highest ranked Irish doubles player. Cluskey retired from professional tennis in November 2015.

== Career ==
=== Early career ===
In 2004, Cluskey won the Irish under-18 singles championship. He also reached the final of the men's doubles and won the mixed doubles at the national championships. He then took the decision in 2005 to move to the United States, where he played college tennis for Louisiana State University. He had a successful four years there where he achieved a national doubles ranking of 3 with partner Ken Skupski. In total he won 82 doubles and 57 singles matches in college tennis.

Cluskey played his first futures event in Limerick in June 2006. He reached the quarter-finals of the doubles with university teammate Ken Skupski and also qualified for the main draw of the singles, reaching the second round. His form earned him a call up to the Irish Davis Cup team for their match against Slovenia where he narrowly lost a tense five set match in the doubles rubber. He continued playing futures during the summer months when he was not attending university. He won his first ever Challenger level match in 2008 at the Shelbourne Irish Open, partnering Colin O'Brien.

=== 2010 ===
In 2010 Cluskey started to make his first breakthroughs at futures level. He won his first doubles tournament in Eilat partnering Michael Venus, who he had played with at university. He then went on to win a further three futures events that year, in Edinburgh, Dublin and Jūrmala, partnering compatriot Colin O'Brien.

=== 2011 ===
Cluskey's ranking enabled him to enter a couple of Challenger tournaments at the start of 2011. After a couple of disappointing results he won his first doubles title of 2011 in March in a futures event in Vaduz and followed that up with another title the following week in Taverne. He went from strength to strength in 2011 and won a further two futures titles, along with reaching six finals. His best run came in October where he reached five consecutive finals at futures events, all of which were in France. He partnered Jean Andersen in three of these finals although they only won one of them. Cluskey was also runner-up in the other two. This form saw Cluskey again enter a couple of Challengers at the end of the year, in Loughborough and Salzburg but again his form was poor, going out in the first round of both.

=== 2012 ===
2012 again saw a slow start to the year for Cluskey, but he managed to turn his fortunes around and take another doubles title in a futures event in Cividino. In May, he then went on to finally have some success at Challenger level, reaching the semi-finals of the Status Athens Open with Frenchman Fabrice Martin. Cluskey and Martin went on to have further success that year, winning futures events in Palma del Río and Bagnères-de-Bigorre, as well as making the quarter-finals of the Guzzini Challenger and the semi-finals of the President's Cup. Cluskey also had some success with other partners, reaching the semi-finals of the Türk Telecom İzmir Cup with Matwé Middelkoop. Cluskey's form this year also some him break into the top 200 of the ATP doubles rankings for the first time in his career in mid-September.

=== 2013 ===
Cluskey started 2013 in the same excellent form he had finished 2012 in. By now he was focusing solely on doubles and he reached four consecutive futures finals in his first four tournaments of the year, although he only won one of them. This form saw him mainly playing on the Challenger Tour by April instead of the futures tournaments he was used to playing. His form at this level was poor though and he regularly exited in the first round of tournaments. As costs began to mount up he was beginning to consider quitting tennis until he spectacularly turned his from round by teaming up with old partner Fabrice Martin to win the PTT Cup. It was the first time either of them had won a title at challenger level. Cluskey then followed up this success only two weeks later, this time winning the Guimarães Open with Maximillian Neuchrist. These two tournament wins gave Cluskey a newfound belief that he could go on to have a successful career in tennis as he rose to a new career high ranking. His good form continued into the next couple of months as he won two more futures events and reached the final of the American Express – TED Open.

=== 2014 ===
Cluskey's form saw him recalled to the Irish Davis Cup team for the first time since 2011. He teamed up with David O'Hare and they nearly pulled off a shock result against Aliaksandr Bury and former world number one doubles player Max Mirnyi, losing in five sets after having had match points in the fourth. Cluskey then went on to reach the final of a futures event in Nottingham with Liam Broady. In April, Cluskey won his first ever Davis Cup rubber, as Ireland overcame Egypt for a 3-2 victory. Clsukey continued to play with a variety of partners and his form began to improve in late May, having struggled earlier in the year, where he reached the semifinals of Karshi Challenger. He then also reached the semifinals of the Prague Open. In July, partnering Mikhail Kukushkin, he made the cut for his first ever ATP World Tour event – the Swedish Open. They were defeated in their opening match by fourth seeds Brunström and Monroe. Cluskey then reached the final of the Guzzini Challenger with Lithuanian Laurynas Grigelis but they were defeated in the final set match tie-break. He failed to continue this form in the following week as he lost in the quarter-finals of the Tampere Open with partner Darren Walsh. After back-to-back first-round exits in Segovia and Prague, Cluskey recovered to reach the semi-finals of the Maserati Challenger with Miguel Ángel Reyes-Varela.

=== Davis Cup ===
Cluskey has represented the Irish Davis Cup team on eight occasions since his first appearance in 2006. He has only competed in doubles for his country and so far has only won one rubber, holding a 1–7 record. His last appearance was in 2014.

== Doubles titles ==
Legend (doubles)
Grand Slam (0)
ATP World Tour Masters 1000 (0)
ATP World Tour 500 (0)
ATP World Tour 250 (0)
ATP Challenger Tour (2)
ITF Futures (14)

Wins (16)

No.	Date	Tournament	Surface	Partner	Opponent in the final	Score
1.	13 February 2010	Eilat, F3	Hard	(New Zealand) Michael Venus	(Belarus) Aliaksandr Bury (Belarus) Pavel Katliarov	6–7(3), 6–3, [15–13]
2.	9 May 2010	Edinburgh, F6	Clay	(Republic of Ireland) Colin O'Brien	(Republic of Ireland) Barry King (United Kingdom) Marcus Willis	6–3, 6–3
3.	24 July 2010	Dublin, F1	Carpet	(Republic of Ireland) Colin O'Brien	(Australia) Colin Ebelthite (Republic of Ireland) Barry King	6–2, 7–6(1)
4.	21 August 2010	Jūrmala, F1	Clay	(Republic of Ireland) Colin O'Brien	(Czech Republic) Jakub Lustyk (Czech Republic) David Novak	2–6, 6–3, [14–12]
5.	26 March 2011	Vaduz, F2	Carpet	(France) Fabrice Martin	(Poland) Piotr Gadomski (Netherlands) Tim Van Terheijden	7–6(2), 6–4
6.	2 April 2011	Taverne, F3	Carpet	(Italy) Claudio Grassi	(Italy) Erik Crepaldi (Poland) Piotr Gadomski	6–2, 6–1
7.	4 June 2011	Ashkelon, F6	Hard	(United States) John Paul Fruttero	(Israel) Noam Behr (Israel) Igor Smilansky	6–3, 6–0
8.	2 October 2011	Forbach, F16	Carpet	(South Africa) Jean Andersen	(France) Michael Bois (France) Kevin Botti	5–7, 6–1, [10–3]
9.	30 March 2012	Cividino, F2	Hard	(India) Purav Raja	(Italy) Andrea Agazzi (Italy) Enrico Iannuzzi	6–7(10), 6–4, [10–2]
10.	30 June 2012	Palma del Río, F18	Hard	(France) Fabrice Martin	(Spain) Gerard Granollers (Spain) Andoni Vivanco-Guzmán	6–3, 6–4
11.	8 September 2012	Bagnères-de-Bigorre, F15	Hard	(France) Fabrice Martin	(France) Charles-Antoine Brézac (France) Simon Cauvard	6–7(4), 7–5, [11–9]
12.	12 January 2013	Schwieberdingen, F1	Hard	(Germany) Alexander Satschko	(Germany) Dominique Maden (Germany) Yannick Maden	6–0, 6–1
13.	14 July 2013	Istanbul	Hard	(France) Fabrice Martin	(United Kingdom) Brydan Klein (South Africa) Ruan Roelofse	3–6, 6–3, [10–5]
14.	28 July 2013	Guimarães	Hard	(Austria) Maximilian Neuchrist	(Spain) Roberto Ortega Olmedo (Spain) Ricardo Villacorta-Alonso	6–7(5), 6–2, [10–8]
15.	23 August 2013	Minsk, F2	Hard	(France) Fabrice Martin	(Moldova) Andrei Ciumac (Ukraine) Volodymyr Uzhylovskyi	6–3, 6–4
16.	31 August 2013	Pozoblanco, F28	Hard	(Austria) Maximilian Neuchrist	(Spain) Ivan Arenas-Gualda (Spain) José Checa Calvo	6–3, 6–2

Runner-up (15)

No.	Date	Tournament	Surface	Partner	Opponent in the final	Score
1.	18 June 2010	Kelibia, F3	Hard	(Republic of Ireland) Colin O'Brien	(France) Laurent Rochette (Russia) Mikhail Vasiliev	3–6, 6–1, [6–10]
2.	23 July 2011	Dublin, F1	Carpet	(Republic of Ireland) James McGee	(France) Albano Olivetti (United Kingdom) Neal Skupski	6–7(4), 3–6
3.	18 September 2011	Mulhouse, F14	Hard	(France) Fabrice Martin	(France) Pierre-Hugues Herbert (France) Albano Olivetti	3–6, 4–6
4.	9 October 2011	Nevers, F17	Hard	(France) Alexandre Sidorenko	(France) Kevin Botti (France) Laurent Rochette	6–7(3), 3–6
5.	14 October 2011	Saint-Dizier, F18	Hard	(Republic of Ireland) Sam Barry	(Germany) Holger Fischer (Czech Republic) Jan Mertl	4–6, 5–7
6.	23 October 2011	La Roche-sur-Yon, F19	Hard	(South Africa) Jean Andersen	(France) Jeremy Blandin (France) Gleb Sakharov	6–7(2), 6–3, [7–10]
7.	29 October 2011	Rodez, F20	Hard	(South Africa) Jean Andersen	(France) Pierre-Hugues Herbert (France) Albano Olivetti	4–6, 3–6
8.	16 June 2012	Martos, F16	Hard	(Republic of Ireland) Sam Barry	(Spain) Iván Arenas-Gualda (Spain) Jaime Pulgar-García	6–7(4), 6–7(7)
9.	11 October 2012	Saint-Dizier, F20	Hard	(France) Alexandre Sidorenko	(France) Antoine Benneteau (France) Nicolas Renavand	5–7, 4–6
10.	19 January 2013	Stuttgart-Stammheim, F2	Hard	(Germany) Alexander Satschko	(Germany) Philipp Marx (Romania) Florin Mergea	2–6, 2–6
11.	27 January 2013	Bressuire, F2	Hard	(Montenegro) Goran Tošić	(France) Pierre-Hugues Herbert (France) Nicolas Renavand	2–6, 6–7(7)
12.	8 February 2013	Wirral, F4	Hard	(United Kingdom) Sean Thornley	(United Kingdom) Lewis Burton (United Kingdom) Neal Skupski	6–7(5), 6–2, [7–10]
13.	9 March 2013	Lille, F4	Hard	(United Kingdom) Lewis Burton	(France) Jonathan Eysseric (France) Nicolas Renavand	7–6(3), 6–7(5), [5–10]
14.	15 September 2013	Istanbul-2	Hard	(Spain) Adrián Menéndez Maceiras	(United Kingdom) Jamie Delgado (Australia) Jordan Kerr	3–6, 2–6
15.	21 February 2014	Nottingham, F5	Hard	(United Kingdom) Liam Broady	(France) Rémi Boutillier (France) Quentin Halys	2–6, 6–0, [8–10]
16.	19 July 2014	Recanati	Hard	(Lithuania) Laurynas Grigelis	(Serbia) Ilija Bozoljac (Serbia) Goran Tošić	7–5, 4–6, [5–10]
