= Maximilian Neuchrist =

Austrian tennis player (born 1991)

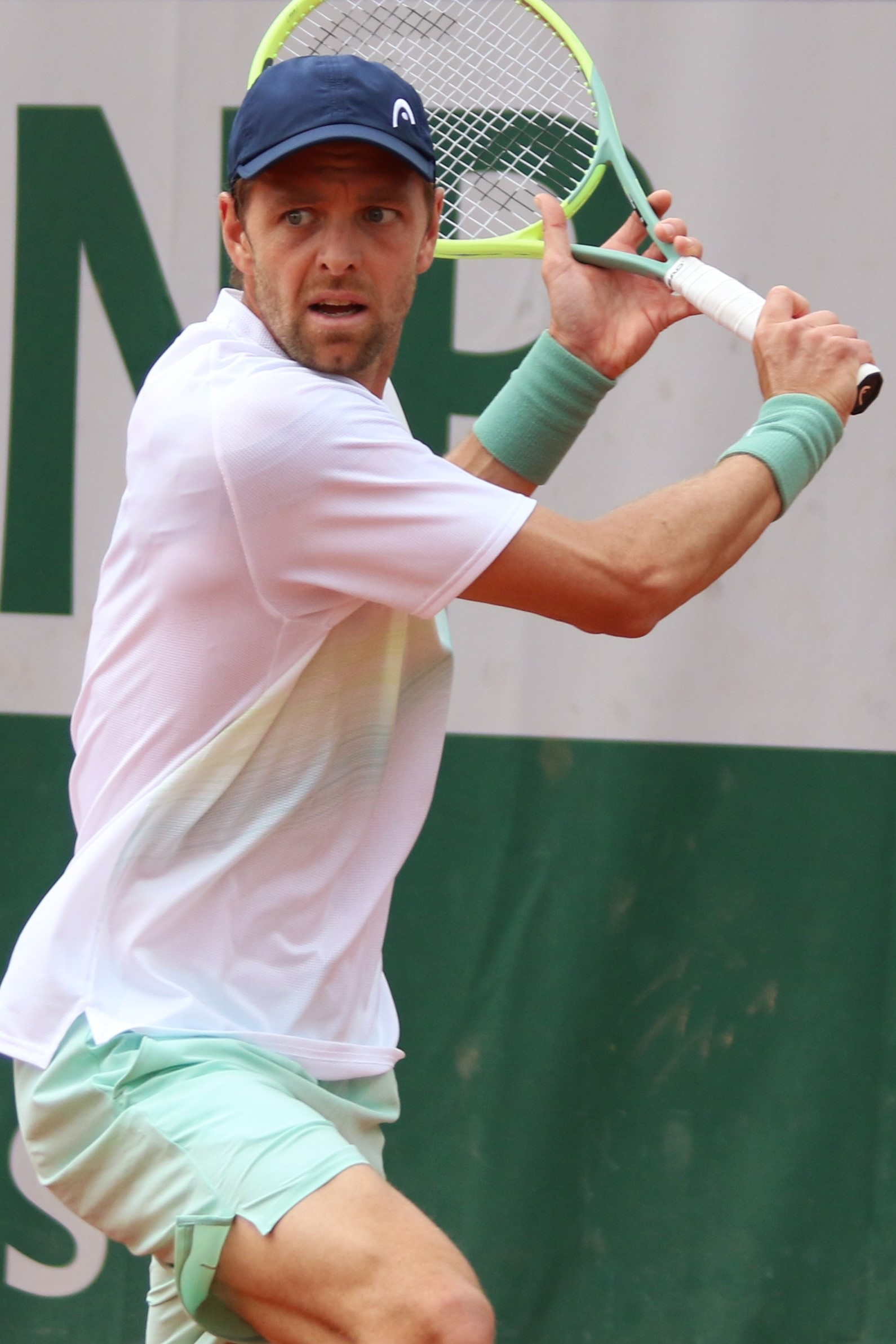
- Neuchrist at the 2023 French Open
- Country (sports): Austria
- Born: 22 July 1991 (age 35) Vienna, Austria
- Plays: Right Handed (Double Handed Backhand)
- Prize money: $ 424,021

Singles
- Career record: 0–0
- Career titles: 0
- Highest ranking: No. 182 (17 April 2023)
- Current ranking: No. 821 (20 July 2026)

Grand Slam singles results
- French Open: Q1 (2023)
- Wimbledon: Q1 (2023)
- US Open: Q1 (2018, 2023)

Doubles
- Career record: 2–3
- Career titles: 0
- Highest ranking: No. 135 (3 March 2014)
- Current ranking: No. 296 (20 July 2026)
- Last updated on: 20 July 2026.

Maximilian Neuchrist (born 22 July 1991) is an Austrian professional tennis player who competes on the ATP Challenger and ITF Futures tour level. Neuchrist has a career high ATP singles ranking of world No. 182 achieved on 17 April 2023 and a career high doubles ranking of world No. 135 achieved on 3 March 2014.

== Career ==
Neuchrist has reached 27 career singles finals with a record of 13 wins and 14 losses, one at the ATP Challenger and the rest at the ITF Futures level. Additionally, he has reached 60 career doubles finals posting a record of 37 wins and 23 losses, which includes a 2–3 record in ATP Challenger finals.

Neuchrist made his ATP Tour debut at the 2012 Vienna Open where he was granted a wildcard entry into the main doubles draw alongside compatriot Andreas Haider-Maurer. They were defeated in the first round by Aljaž Bedene and Grega Žemlja 7–6^{(7–5)}, 3–6, [8–10].

He reached his maiden final at the 2022 Maia Challenger where he lost to Luca Van Assche.

On 10 April 2023, he reached the top 200 at world No. 192, following a semifinal showing at the 2023 Mexico City Open as a qualifier and a quarterfinal at the 2023 San Luis Open Challenger losing both matches to Dominik Koepfer.

== ATP Challenger and ITF Futures finals ==
=== Singles: 30 (15–15) ===
Legend ATP Challenger (0–1) ITF Futures/World Tennis Tour (15–14)	Finals by surface Hard (11–8) Clay (4–6) Grass (0–0) Carpet (0–1)

Result	W–L	Date	Tournament	Tier	Surface	Opponent	Score
Loss	0–1	Jul 2012	Serbia F3, Belgrade	Futures	Clay	(Serbia) Danilo Petrović	3–6, 0–6
Loss	0–2	Oct 2012	Israel F11, Ashkelon	Futures	Hard	(Netherlands) Wesley Koolhof	1–6, 2–6
Win	1–2	Nov 2012	Israel F12, Netanya	Futures	Hard	(France) Axel Michon	6–4, 6–4
Win	2–2	Nov 2012	Cambodia F1, Phnom Penh	Futures	Hard	(France) Axel Michon	1–6, 6–1, 6–4
Loss	2–3	Mar 2013	Israel F6, Netanya	Futures	Hard	(Chinese Taipei) Ti Chen	4–6, 3–6
Win	3–3	May 2013	Turkey F19, Antalya	Futures	Hard	(United Kingdom) Jack Carpenter	6–2, 7–5
Loss	3–4	Dec 2013	Senegal F1, Dakar	Futures	Hard	(Croatia) Ante Pavić	0–5 ret.
Win	4–4	Dec 2013	Senegal F2, Dakar	Futures	Hard	(Bosnia and Herzegovina) Aldin Šetkić	4–6, 7–6^{(7–5)}, 6–2
Loss	4–5	Apr 2014	Turkey F11, Antalya	Futures	Hard	(Austria) Bastian Trinker	7–6^{(7–1)}, 4–6, 4–6
Loss	4–6	Apr 2014	Korea F1, Seoul	Futures	Hard	(South Korea) Lim Yong-kyu	6–7^{(4–7)}, 3–6
Win	5–6	Apr 2015	Turkey F14, Antalya	Futures	Hard	(Italy) Claudio Fortuna	4–6, 6–1, 6–1
Loss	5–7	Jul 2015	Czech Republic F5, Ústí nad Orlicí	Futures	Clay	(Czech Republic) Marek Michalička	2–6, 4–6
Win	6–7	Jul 2015	Germany F8, Trier	Futures	Clay	(Germany) Jan Choinski	6–7^{(5–7)}, 6–4, 6–3
Win	7–7	Nov 2016	Kuwait F1, Meshref	Futures	Hard	(Uzbekistan) Sanjar Fayziev	6–3, 6–4
Win	8–7	Dec 2016	Cyprus F3, Larnaca	Futures	Hard	(Austria) Lucas Miedler	7–6^{(7–3)}, 6–3
Win	9–7	Jul 2017	Macedonia F1, Skopje	Futures	Clay	(Croatia) Nino Serdarušić	6–3, 7–5
Win	10–7	Nov 2017	Kuwait F1, Meshref	Futures	Hard	(Italy) Alessandro Bega	7–6^{(7–4)}, 6–3
Win	11–7	Nov 2017	Kuwait F2, Meshref	Futures	Hard	(Russia) Kristian Lozan	7–6^{(7–5)}, 6–1
Win	12–7	Nov 2017	Kuwait F3, Meshref	Futures	Hard	(France) Baptiste Crepatte	7–5, 6–4
Loss	12–8	Feb 2018	Great Britain F3, Shrewsbury	Futures	Hard	(France) Fabien Reboul	4–6, 6–3, 6–7^{(3–7)}
Loss	12–9	Mar 2018	Italy F1, Trento	Futures	Carpet	(Lithuania) Laurynas Grigelis	4–6, 4–6
Win	13–9	Apr 2018	Nigeria F2, Abuja	Futures	Hard	(Brazil) João Menezes	6–3, 6–7^{(5–7)}, 6–2
Loss	13–10	Nov 2021	M25 Villers-les-Nancy, France	World Tour	Hard	(France) Antoine Escoffier	4–6, 4–6
Loss	13–11	Apr 2022	M15 Monastir, Tunesia	World Tour	Hard	(Italy) Mattia Bellucci	6–7^{(4−7)}, 3–6
Loss	13–12	May 2022	M25 Most, Czech Republic	World Tour	Clay	(Czech Republic) Andrew Paulson	3–6, 3–6
Loss	13–13	Sep 2022	M25 Sierre, Switzerland	World Tour	Clay	(Switzerland) Rémy Bertola	7–6^{(7−2)}, 6–7^{(7−9)}, 4–6
Loss	13–14	Dec 2022	Maia, Portugal	Challenger	Clay (i)	(France) Luca Van Assche	6–3, 4–6, 0–6
Win	14–14	Sep 2024	M25 Kigali, Rwanda	World Tour	Clay	(France) Corentin Denolly	6–4, 7–5
Loss	14–15	Oct 2024	M25 Kampala, Uganda	World Tour	Clay	(France) Corentin Denolly	3–6, 4–6
Win	15–15	Oct 2024	M15 Kampala, Uganda	World Tour	Clay	(Germany) Maik Steiner	6–3, 6–2

=== Doubles: 75 (44–31) ===
Legend ATP Challenger (6–9) ITF Futures/World Tennis Tour (38–22)	Finals by surface Hard (23–12) Clay (19–18) Grass (0–0) Carpet (2–1)

Result	W–L	Date	Tournament	Tier	Surface	Partner	Opponents	Score
Win	1–0	Dec 2009	Dominican Republic F3, Santo Domingo	Futures	Hard	(Austria) Tristan-Samuel Weissborn	(Venezuela) Luis David Martinez (Austria) Nikolaus Moser	0–6, 7–6^{(7–4)}, [10–8]
Loss	1–1	Jul 2010	Austria F2, Kramsach	Futures	Clay	(Austria) Tristan-Samuel Weissborn	(Czech Republic) Petr Kovačka (Czech Republic) Marek Michalička	1–6, 3–6
Loss	1–2	May 2011	Bulgaria F3, Sofia	Futures	Clay	(Germany) Dominik Schulz	(Germany) Steven Moneke (Germany) Matthias Kolbe	1–6, 2–6
Win	2–2	Jul 2011	Austria F2, Kramsach	Futures	Clay	(Austria) Tristan-Samuel Weissborn	(Czech Republic) Roman Vögeli (Czech Republic) Roman Jebavý	6–3, 6–3
Win	3–2	Sep 2011	Austria F8, St. Poelten	Futures	Clay	(Austria) Tristan-Samuel Weissborn	(Slovakia) Michal Pazicky (Czech Republic) Roman Jebavý	7–5, 5–7, [11–9]
Win	4–2	Apr 2012	Greece F3, Heraklion	Futures	Carpet	(Croatia) Mate Pavić	(Italy) Erik Crepaldi (Chile) Laslo Urrutia Fuentes	7–6^{(7–3)}, 7–6^{(7–2)}
Loss	4–3	May 2012	Turkey F19, Mersin	Futures	Clay	(Croatia) Mate Pavić	(New Zealand) Sebastian Lavie (Australia) Maverick Banes	4–6, 6–3, [7–10]
Loss	4–4	Jul 2012	Serbia F3, Belgrade	Futures	Clay	(Austria) Nicolas Reissig	(Serbia) Ivan Bjelica (Croatia) Matej Sabanov	4–6, 1–6
Win	5–4	Jul 2012	Austria F3, Bad Waltersdorf	Futures	Clay	(Croatia) Mate Pavić	(United Kingdom) Daniel Smethurst (United Kingdom) James Marsalek	6–4, 6–3
Loss	5–5	Aug 2012	Austria F4, Fieberbrunn	Futures	Clay	(Croatia) Mate Pavić	(Australia) Dane Propoggia (New Zealand) José Statham	7–6^{(8–6)}, 5–7, [6–10]
Win	6–5	Aug 2012	Austria F6, Innsbruck	Futures	Clay	(Croatia) Mate Pavić	(Austria) Tristan-Samuel Weissborn (Austria) Lukas Jastraunig	6–4, 6–3
Loss	6–6	Aug 2012	Austria F7, Pörtschach	Futures	Clay	(Croatia) Mate Pavić	(Austria) Tristan-Samuel Weissborn (Austria) Lukas Jastraunig	6–7^{(5–7)}, 3–6
Win	7–6	Mar 2013	Israel F6, Netanya	Futures	Hard	(Chinese Taipei) Ti Chen	(France) Alexis Musialek (France) Jérôme Inzerillo	7–5, 6–3
Loss	7–7	May 2013	Turkey F19, Antalya	Futures	Hard	(Italy) Erik Crepaldi	(Italy) Claudio Fortuna (Italy) Matteo Marfia	1–6, 1–6
Loss	7–8	Jun 2013	Tanger, Morocco	Challenger	Clay	(Croatia) Mate Pavić	(Serbia) Nikola Ćirić (Serbia) Goran Tošić	3–6, 7–6^{(7–5)}, [8–10]
Win	8–8	Jul 2013	Guimarães, Portugal	Challenger	Hard	(Republic of Ireland) James Cluskey	(Spain) Roberto Ortega Olmedo (Spain) Ricardo Villacorta Alonso	6–7 ^{(5–7)}, 6–2, [10–8]
Win	9–8	Sep 2013	Spain F28, Pozoblanco	Futures	Hard	(Republic of Ireland) James Cluskey	(Spain) Ivan Arenas-Gualda (Spain) José Checa Calvo	6–3, 6–2
Win	10–8	Dec 2013	Senegal F1, Dakar	Futures	Hard	(Bosnia and Herzegovina) Aldin Šetkić	(Italy) Francesco Garzelli (Venezuela) Jordi Muñoz Abreu	6–1, 6–4
Win	11–8	Apr 2014	Turkey F10, Antalya	Futures	Hard	(Slovakia) Karol Beck	(Germany) Andreas Mies (United Kingdom) George Coupland	6–2, 6–3
Loss	11–9	Nov 2014	Kuwait F3, Meshref	Futures	Hard	(Austria) Dominik Wirlend	(Belgium) Jeroen Vanneste (France) Calvin Hemery	1–6, 3–6
Loss	11–10	Dec 2014	Qatar F4, Doha	Futures	Hard	(Republic of Ireland) Sam Barry	(United Kingdom) Scott Clayton (United Kingdom) Richard Gabb	4–6, 7–6^{(7–5)}, [6–10]
Loss	11–11	Dec 2014	Qatar F5, Doha	Futures	Hard	(Republic of Ireland) Sam Barry	(India) Ramkumar Ramanathan (India) N.Sriram Balaji	3–6, 4–6
Win	12–11	Jan 2015	Turkey F3, Antalya	Futures	Hard	(Austria) Lucas Miedler	(China) Zhe Li (South Africa) Ruan Roelofse	6–4, 6–4
Loss	12–12	Feb 2015	Egypt F6, Sharm El Sheikh	Futures	Hard	(Austria) Lucas Miedler	(Turkey) Cem İlkel (Turkey) Anil Yuksel	7–6^{(7–1)}, 3–6, [7–10]
Win	13–12	Mar 2015	Egypt F7, Sharm El Sheikh	Futures	Hard	(Austria) Lucas Miedler	(Ukraine) Dmytro Badanov (Russia) Dmitry Surchenko	6–1, 6–2
Win	14–12	Apr 2015	Turkey F14, Antalya	Futures	Hard	(United Kingdom) Richard Gabb	(France) Antoine Escoffier (Réunion) Cesar Testoni	6–2, 6–4
Win	15–12	Apr 2015	Turkey F15, Antalya	Futures	Hard	(United Kingdom) Richard Gabb	(Italy) Riccardo Belotti (Austria) Pascal Brunner	6–2, 6–3
Win	16–12	May 2015	Turkey F17, Antalya	Futures	Hard	(Austria) Lucas Miedler	(Switzerland) Antoine Bellier (France) Hugo Nys	4–6, 6–3, [10–7]
Win	17–12	May 2015	Turkey F18, Antalya	Futures	Hard	(Austria) Lucas Miedler	(France) Benjamin Bonzi (France) Fabien Reboul	6–2, 6–3
Loss	17–13	Jun 2015	Slovenia F2, Ljubljana	Futures	Clay	(Austria) Lucas Miedler	(Ukraine) Danylo Kalenichenko (Portugal) Gonçalo Oliveira	5–7, 6–7^{(3–7)}
Win	18–13	Jul 2015	Czech Republic F5, Ústí nad Orlicí	Futures	Clay	(Austria) Lucas Miedler	(Poland) Adam Majchrowicz (Poland) Pawel Cias	7–6^{(7–3)}, 6–4
Win	19–13	Jul 2015	Austria F4, Kramsach	Futures	Clay	(Austria) Lucas Miedler	(Argentina) Federico Coria (Chile) Cristóbal Saavedra Corvalán	4–6, 6–2, [10–8]
Win	20–13	Jul 2015	Germany F8, Trier	Futures	Clay	(Germany) George Von Massow	(Luxembourg) Ugo Nastasi (Luxembourg) Mike Scheidweiler	6–4, 5–7, [10–8]
Win	21–13	Aug 2015	Italy F22, Appiano	Futures	Clay	(Austria) Tristan-Samuel Weissborn	(Brazil) Wilson Leite (Brazil) Bruno Sant'Anna	7–5, 4–6, [10–3]
Win	22–13	Aug 2015	Italy F23, Este	Futures	Clay	(Austria) Tristan-Samuel Weissborn	(Brazil) Rafael Matos (Brazil) Marcelo Zormann	2–6, 6–3, [10–8]
Loss	22–14	Nov 2015	Pune, India	Challenger	Hard	(India) Divij Sharan	(Spain) Gerard Granollers (Spain) Adrián Menéndez Maceiras	6–1, 3–6, [6–10]
Win	23–14	Nov 2015	Ortisei, Italy	Challenger	Hard	(Austria) Tristan-Samuel Weissborn	(Croatia) Nikola Mektić (Croatia) Antonio Šančić	7–6^{(9–7)}, 6–3
Win	24–14	Jul 2016	Austria F2, Kramsach	Futures	Clay	(Netherlands) David Pel	(Austria) Sebastian Bader (Austria) Matthias Haim	6–3, 5–7, [10–4]
Win	25–14	Jul 2016	Germany F8, Kassel	Futures	Clay	(Netherlands) David Pel	(Czech Republic) Petr Nouza (Czech Republic) David Škoch	6–2, 7–6^{(7–5)}
Win	26–14	Aug 2016	Poland F5, Bydgoszcz	Futures	Clay	(Netherlands) David Pel	(Poland) Grzegorz Panfil (Poland) Michal Dembek	6–1, 7–5
Loss	26–15	Sep 2016	Banja Luka, Bosnia & Herzegovina	Challenger	Clay	(Italy) Andrea Arnaboldi	(Czech Republic) Roman Jebavý (Czech Republic) Jan Šátral	6–7^{(3–7)}, 6–4, [7–10]
Win	27–15	Dec 2016	Cyprus F3, Larnaca	Futures	Hard	(Austria) Lucas Miedler	(Russia) Markos Kalovelonis (France) Alexandre Müller	6–3, 1–6, [10–5]
Win	28–15	Dec 2016	Israel F17, Tel Aviv	Futures	Hard	(Austria) David Pichler	(France) David Guez (France) Mick Lescure	6–0, 6–3
Loss	28–16	Feb 2017	Switzerland F2, Bellevue	Futures	Carpet	(Netherlands) David Pel	(Germany) Daniel Altmaier (Germany) Marvin Netuschil	5–7, 6–1, [9–11]
Win	29–16	Jun 2017	Tunisia F23, Hammamet	Futures	Clay	(Austria) Lucas Miedler	(France) Arthur Rinderknech (France) Florian Lakat	7–6^{(7–2)}, 5–7, [14–12]
Loss	29–17	Jun 2017	Hungary F5, Budapest	Futures	Clay	(Austria) David Pichler	(Croatia) Ivan Sabanov (Croatia) Matej Sabanov	4–6, 6–7^{(2–7)}
Win	30–17	Jul 2017	Austria F2, Kramsach	Futures	Clay	(Austria) Pascal Brunner	(Switzerland) Adrian Bodmer (Germany) Jakob Sude	6–2, 2–6, [10–5]
Loss	30–18	Jul 2017	Germany F8, Kassel	Futures	Clay	(Austria) David Pichler	(Germany) Tom Schonenberg (Germany) Mats Moraing	6–7^{(4–7)}, 6–2, [2–10]
Win	31–18	Jul 2017	Macedonia F1, Skopje	Futures	Clay	(Austria) David Pichler	(Chinese Taipei) Yang Tsung-hua (Australia) Dane Propoggia	7–6^{(7–1)}, 6–3
Win	32–18	Mar 2018	Italy F1, Trento	Futures	Carpet	(France) Sadio Doumbia	(France) Rémi Boutillier (Belgium) Romain Barbosa	7–5, 2–6, [10–6]
Loss	32–19	Mar 2018	Portugal F3, Loulé	Futures	Hard	(Austria) David Pichler	(Spain) David Vega Hernández (Spain) Roberto Ortega Olmedo	6–4, 4–6, [3–10]
Win	33–19	Apr 2018	Nigeria F1, Abuja	Futures	Hard	(Sweden) Markus Eriksson	(France) Rémi Boutillier (France) Tom Jomby	6–3, 4–6, [15–13]
Loss	33–20	Jun 2019	M25 Palma del Rio, Spain	World Tour	Hard	(France) Albano Olivetti	(France) Mick Lescure (France) Tom Jomby	6–7^{(5–7)}, 4–6
Win	34–20	Apr 2021	M25 Biel, Switzerland	World Tour	Hard	(Austria) Alexander Erler	(Switzerland) Yannik Steinegger (Switzerland) Jakub Paul	6–3, 4–6, [10–2]
Loss	34–21	May 2021	M15 Brčko, Bosnia and Herzegovina	World Tour	Clay	(Switzerland) Rémy Bertola	(Brazil) Gilbert Klier Junior (Brazil) João Lucas Reis da Silva	w/o
Win	35–21	Oct 2021	M25 Portimão, Portugal	World Tour	Hard	(Germany) Sebastian Fanselow	(Poland) Pawel Cias (Portugal) Goncalo Falcao	w/o
Loss	35–22	Nov 2021	Manama, Bahrain	Challenger	Hard	(Greece) Michail Pervolarakis	(Portugal) Nuno Borges (Portugal) Francisco Cabral	5−7, 7−6^{(7−5)}, [8−10]
Win	36–22	Mar 2022	M25 Faro, Portugal	World Tour	Hard	(Germany) Kai Wehnelt	(Japan) Makoto Ochi (Japan) Yuta Shimizu	6−4, 6−4
Loss	36–23	Mar 2022	M25 Portimão, Portugal	World Tour	Hard	(Germany) Kai Wehnelt	(Chinese Taipei) Yu Hsiou Hsu (Austria) Neil Oberleitner	3−6, 6−3, [7−10]
Win	37–23	Nov 2022	Calgary, Canada	Challenger	Hard (i)	(Greece) Michail Pervolarakis	(Italy) Julian Ocleppo (Germany) Kai Wehnelt	6–4, 6–4
Loss	37–24	Apr 2023	León, Mexico	Challenger	Hard	(Greece) Michail Pervolarakis	(Tunisia) Aziz Dougaz (France) Antoine Escoffier	6–7^{(5–7)}, 6–3, [5–10]
Loss	37–25	Oct 2023	Ortisei, Italy	Challenger	Hard (i)	(Switzerland) Jakub Paul	(Czech Republic) Andrew Paulson (Czech Republic) Patrik Rikl	6–4, 6–7^{(7–9)}, [9–11]
Win	38–25	Sep 2024	M25 Kigali, Rwanda	World Tour	Clay	(Switzerland) Arthur Laborde	(Zimbabwe) Benjamin Lock (Zimbabwe) Courtney John Lock	6–4, 3–6, [10–4]
Win	39–25	May 2025	M15 Villach, Austria	World Tour	Clay	(Switzerland) Arthur Laborde	(Germany) Jeremy Schifris (Italy) Leonardo Taddia	6–7^{(1–7)}, 6–3, [10–2]
Loss	39–26	Jun 2025	M15 Klagenfurt, Austria	World Tour	Clay	(Switzerland) Arthur Laborde	(Czech Republic) Dominik Reček (Czech Republic) Daniel Siniakov	6–7^{(2–7)}, 6–7^{(5–7)}
Loss	39–27	Jun 2025	M25 Klosters, Switzerland	World Tour	Clay	(France) Corentin Denolly	(Bulgaria) Petr Nesterov (Switzerland) Timofey Stepanov	6–7^{(4–7)}, 4–6
Loss	39–28	Jun 2025	M25 Marburg, Germany	World Tour	Clay	(Germany) Kai Wehnelt	(France) Max Westphal (United States) Theodore Winegar	6–7^{(7–9)}, 2–6
Win	40–28	Apr 2026	M25 Monastir, Tunisia	World Tennis Tour	Hard	(Tunisia) Skander Mansouri	(Italy) Federico Iannaccone (Ukraine) Georgii Kravchenko	7–6^{(7–4)}, 7–5
Win	41–28	Apr 2026	M25 Monastir, Tunisia	World Tennis Tour	Hard	(Tunisia) Skander Mansouri	(France) César Bouchelaghem (Slovenia) Filip Jeff Planinšek	7–5, 6–2
Loss	41–29	Jun 2026	Lyon, France	Challenger	Clay	(Tunisia) Skander Mansouri	(Thailand) Pruchya Isaro (India) Niki Kaliyanda Poonacha	0–6, 1–6
Win	42–29	Jun 2026	Brașov, România	Challenger	Clay	(Czech Republic) Michael Vrbenský	(Spain) Iñigo Cervantes (Ukraine) Denys Molchanov	6–3, 3–6, [10–4]
Loss	42–30	Jul 2026	Liberec, Czech Republic	Challenger	Clay	(Czech Republic) David Poljak	(Spain) Iñigo Cervantes (Ukraine) Denys Molchanov	6–7^{(7–9)}, 3–6
Win	43–30	Aug 2026	Sion, Switzerland	Challenger	Clay	(Czech Republic) David Poljak	(Bolivia) Murkel Dellien (Argentina) Facundo Mena	6–4, 6–4
Loss	43–31	Sep 2026	Tulln an der Donau, Austria	Challenger	Clay	(Romania) Victor Vlad Cornea	(Slovakia) Miloš Karol (Czech Republic) Andrew Paulson	3–6, 6–3, [7–10]
Win	44–31	Nov 2026	Taranto, Italy	Challenger	Hard	(Tunisia) Skander Mansouri	(Spain) Ignasi Forcano (Spain) Rafael Izquierdo Luque	6–4, 7–5
