= 2018 Guzzini Challenger – Singles =

Singles
- 2018 Guzzini Challenger

Final
- Champion: (Germany) Daniel Brands
- Runner-up: (Spain) Adrián Menéndez Maceiras
- Score: 7–5, 6–3

Events
Singles	Doubles
← 2017 ·	Guzzini Challenger	· 2019 →

Viktor Galović was the defending champion but lost in the semifinals to Adrián Menéndez Maceiras.

Daniel Brands won the title after defeating Menéndez Maceiras 7–5, 6–3 in the final.

== Seeds ==
1. (India) Ramkumar Ramanathan (first round)
2. (Belarus) Ilya Ivashka (quarterfinals)
3. (France) Quentin Halys (first round)
4. (Kazakhstan) Alexander Bublik (first round)
5. (Spain) Adrián Menéndez Maceiras (final)
6. (Croatia) Viktor Galović (semifinals)
7. (Italy) Salvatore Caruso (quarterfinals)
8. (Japan) Hiroki Moriya (quarterfinals)

== Draw ==
=== Key ===
- Q = Qualifier
- WC = Wild card
- LL = Lucky loser
- Alt = Alternate
- SE = Special exempt
- PR = Protected ranking
- ITF = ITF entry
- JE = Junior exempt
- w/o = Walkover
- r = Retired
- d = Defaulted
- SR = Special ranking

=== Finals ===
Semifinals
PR	(Germany) Daniel Brands	6	6
(Ecuador) Roberto Quiroz	0	3
5	(Spain) Adrián Menéndez Maceiras	6	6
6	(Croatia) Viktor Galović	1	2

Final
PR	(Germany) Daniel Brands	7	6
5	(Spain) Adrián Menéndez Maceiras	5	3

=== Top half ===
First round
1	(India) R Ramanathan	6^{5}	6^{8}
PR	(Germany) D Brands	7^{7}	7^{10}
WC	(Italy) E Dalla Valle	4	4
(Spain) B Zapata Miralles	6	6
(Argentina) F Argüello	6	3	6
WC	(Italy) R Brancaccio	1	6	3
(China) Ze Zhang	4	6	5
7	(Italy) S Caruso	6	3	7
3	(France) Q Halys	6	6^{5}	4
WC	(Italy) A Vavassori	1	7^{7}	6
(Serbia) D Petrović	2	6	2
(Ecuador) R Quiroz	6	3	6
(Colombia) DE Galán	2	4
(Czech Republic) L Rosol	6	6
(Italy) A Arnaboldi	6^{6}	6	3
8	(Japan) H Moriya	7^{8}	4	6

Second round
PR	(Germany) D Brands	6	7
(Spain) B Zapata Miralles	4	5
(Argentina) F Argüello	4	2
7	(Italy) S Caruso	6	6
WC	(Italy) A Vavassori	4	3
(Ecuador) R Quiroz	6	6
(Czech Republic) L Rosol	6	4	2
8	(Japan) H Moriya	4	6	6

Quarterfinals
PR	(Germany) D Brands	6	7^{9}
7	(Italy) S Caruso	4	6^{7}
(Ecuador) R Quiroz	6	6
8	(Japan) H Moriya	4	2

Semifinals
PR	(Germany) D Brands	6	6
(Ecuador) R Quiroz	0	3

=== Bottom half ===
First round
5	(Spain) A Menéndez Maceiras	6	6
WC	(Italy) Giacomo Miccini	2	1
Q	(Bosnia and Herzegovina) A Šetkić	4	6	6
Q	(Chile) MT Barrios Vera	6	3	4
(Italy) L Giustino	4	6	6
Q	(Italy) A Basso	6	4	4
(France) A Hoang	7	6
4	(Kazakhstan) A Bublik	5	1
6	(Croatia) V Galović	6^{5}	6	7^{7}
Q	(Spain) A Artuñedo	7^{7}	1	6^{4}
(Dominican Republic) R Cid Subervi	6	6^{6}	2
(France) D Guez	4	7^{8}	6
(Spain) P Martínez	4	4
(Belarus) E Gerasimov	6	6
(Ukraine) I Marchenko	3	3
2	(Belarus) I Ivashka	6	6

Second round
5	(Spain) A Menéndez Maceiras	6	4	6
Q	(Bosnia and Herzegovina) A Šetkić	2	6	4
(Italy) L Giustino	6	6^{2}	6
(France) A Hoang	3	7^{7}	0
6	(Croatia) V Galović	6	6
(France) D Guez	3	4
(Belarus) E Gerasimov	5	4
2	(Belarus) I Ivashka	7	6

Quarterfinals
5	(Spain) A Menéndez Maceiras	6	6
(Italy) L Giustino	4	2
6	(Croatia) V Galović	7	6
2	(Belarus) I Ivashka	5	4

Semifinals
5	(Spain) A Menéndez Maceiras	6	6
6	(Croatia) V Galović	1	2
