= 2016 Guzzini Challenger – Singles =

Singles
- 2016 Guzzini Challenger

Final
- Champion: (Ukraine) Illya Marchenko
- Runner-up: (Belarus) Ilya Ivashka
- Score: 6–4, 6–4

Events
| Singles | Doubles |
| ← 2015 · | Guzzini Challenger | · 2017 → |

Mirza Bašić was the defending champion but chose not to participate.

Illya Marchenko won the title after defeating Ilya Ivashka 6–4, 6–4 in the final.

== Seeds ==
1. (Russia) Evgeny Donskoy (semifinals)
2. (Ukraine) Illya Marchenko (champion)
3. (Hungary) Márton Fucsovics (semifinals)
4. (Colombia) Eduardo Struvay (first round)
5. (Belgium) Ruben Bemelmans (quarterfinals)
6. (Italy) Luca Vanni (quarterfinals)
7. (Russia) Andrey Rublev (second round)
8. (Bosnia and Herzegovina) Aldin Šetkić (second round)

== Draw ==
=== Key ===
- Q = Qualifier
- WC = Wild card
- LL = Lucky loser
- Alt = Alternate
- SE = Special exempt
- PR = Protected ranking
- ITF = ITF entry
- JE = Junior exempt
- w/o = Walkover
- r = Retired
- d = Defaulted
- SR = Special ranking

=== Finals ===
Semifinals
1 | (Russia) Evgeny Donskoy | 7 | 6^{8} | 2
(Belarus) Ilya Ivashka | 5 | 7^{10} | 6
3 | (Hungary) Márton Fucsovics | 3 | 2
2 | (Ukraine) Illya Marchenko | 6 | 6

Final
(Belarus) Ilya Ivashka | 4 | 4
2 | (Ukraine) Illya Marchenko | 6 | 6

=== Top half ===
First round
1 | (Russia) E Donskoy | 6 | 6
(Italy) F Gaio | 3 | 2
PR | (France) A Olivetti | 6 | 6
WC | (Italy) R Bonadio | 4 | 4
LL | (Belarus) D Zhyrmont | 6^{5} | 6 | 7^{7}
WC | (Italy) A Vavassori | 7^{7} | 3 | 6^{5}
(Poland) M Przysiężny | 7^{7} | 3 | 5
6 | (Italy) L Vanni | 6^{5} | 6 | 7
4 | (Colombia) E Struvay | 3 | 3
(Italy) Edoardo Eremin | 6 | 6
(Spain) A Menéndez Maceiras | 6 | 6
(Belgium) Y Mertens | 1 | 2
(Italy) M Viola | 3 | 1
(Belarus) I Ivashka | 6 | 6
Q | (Croatia) V Galović | 3 | 6^{3}
8 | (Bosnia and Herzegovina) A Šetkić | 6 | 7^{7}

Second round
1 | (Russia) E Donskoy | 6^{5} | 7^{7} | 7^{7}
PR | (France) A Olivetti | 7^{7} | 6^{5} | 6^{5}
LL | (Belarus) D Zhyrmont | 1 | 7^{7} | 3
6 | (Italy) L Vanni | 6 | 6^{2} | 6
(Italy) E Eremin | 6^{4} | 6^{3}
(Spain) A Menéndez Maceiras | 7^{7} | 7^{7}
(Belarus) I Ivashka | 6 | 5 | 6
8 | (Bosnia and Herzegovina) A Šetkić | 4 | 7 | 3

Quarterfinals
1 | (Russia) E Donskoy | 3 | 6 | 6
6 | (Italy) L Vanni | 6 | 3 | 0
(Spain) A Menéndez Maceiras | 6^{2} | 6 | 4
(Belarus) I Ivashka | 7^{7} | 2 | 6

Semifinals
1 | (Russia) E Donskoy | 7 | 6^{8} | 2
(Belarus) I Ivashka | 5 | 7^{10} | 6

=== Bottom half ===
First round
5 | (Belgium) R Bemelmans | 7 | 2 | 7^{7}
LL | (France) R Boutillier | 5 | 6 | 6^{3}
(France) A Sidorenko | 6^{1} | 6 | 3
Q | (Russia) A Bublik | 7^{7} | 3 | 6
SE | (Italy) G Mager | 6^{5} | 6 | 6^{5}
Q | (Croatia) M Delić | 7^{7} | 3 | 7^{7}
Q | (Croatia) F Veger | 2 | 7 | 3
3 | (Hungary) M Fucsovics | 6 | 5 | 6
7/WC | (Russia) A Rublev | 6 | 6
(Spain) R Ortega Olmedo | 2 | 4
(Italy) A Bega | 7 | 6
(Georgia (country)) A Metreveli | 5 | 3
(Uzbekistan) F Dustov | 6 | 6
WC | (Italy) Antonio Massara | 3 | 3
(France) M Janvier | 1 | 7^{8} | 6^{4}
2 | (Ukraine) I Marchenko | 6 | 6^{6} | 7^{7}

Second round
5 | (Belgium) R Bemelmans | 7^{7} | 7
Q | (Russia) A Bublik | 6^{3} | 5
Q | (Croatia) M Delić | 1 | 5
3 | (Hungary) M Fucsovics | 6 | 7
7/WC | (Russia) A Rublev | 4 | 5
(Italy) A Bega | 6 | 7
(Uzbekistan) F Dustov | 0^{r}
2 | (Ukraine) I Marchenko | 2

Quarterfinals
5 | (Belgium) R Bemelmans | 6^{12} | 6 | 6^{2}
3 | (Hungary) M Fucsovics | 7^{14} | 4 | 7^{7}
(Italy) A Bega | 1 | 3
2 | (Ukraine) I Marchenko | 6 | 6

Semifinals
3 | (Hungary) M Fucsovics | 3 | 2
2 | (Ukraine) I Marchenko | 6 | 6
