= 2016 Guzzini Challenger – Doubles =

Doubles
- 2016 Guzzini Challenger

Final
- Champions: (Germany) Kevin Krawietz (France) Albano Olivetti
- Runners-up: (Belgium) Ruben Bemelmans (Spain) Adrián Menéndez-Maceiras
- Score: 6–3, 7–6^{(7–4)}

Events
Singles	Doubles
← 2015 ·	Guzzini Challenger	· 2017 →

Divij Sharan and Ken Skupski were the defending champions but chose not to defend their title.

Kevin Krawietz and Albano Olivetti won the title after defeating Ruben Bemelmans and Adrián Menéndez-Maceiras 6–3, 7–6^{(7–4)} in the final.

== Seeds ==
1. (Germany) Kevin Krawietz / (France) Albano Olivetti (champions)
2. (Belgium) Ruben Bemelmans / (Spain) Adrián Menéndez-Maceiras (final)
3. (Croatia) Ivan Sabanov / (Croatia) Matej Sabanov (semifinals)
4. (Russia) Alexandr Igoshin / (Russia) Yan Sabanin (semifinals)

== Draw ==
=== Key ===
- Q = Qualifier
- WC = Wild card
- LL = Lucky loser
- Alt = Alternate
- SE = Special exempt
- PR = Protected ranking
- ITF = ITF entry
- JE = Junior exempt
- w/o = Walkover
- r = Retired
- d = Defaulted
- SR = Special ranking

First round
(Italy) Lorenzo Frigerio (Italy) Francesco Vilardo	2	6	[10]
(Croatia) V Galović (Italy) Antonio Massara	6	1	[12]
4	(Russia) Alexandr Igoshin (Russia) Yan Sabanin	6	6
WC	(Italy) Edoardo Lamberti (Italy) Paride Mangiaterra	1	1
(Georgia (country)) A Metreveli (Belarus) D Zhyrmont	6	6
WC	(United States) Sam Barnett (United States) J Witten	1	4
(Italy) A Bega (France) M Janvier	4	4
(Italy) F Gaio (Italy) A Vavassori	6	6
(Italy) Riccardo Bonario (Italy) G Mager	0	6^{4}
3	(Croatia) I Sabanov (Croatia) M Sabanov	6	7^{7}
(Croatia) M Delić (Croatia) F Veger	3	6	[6]
(France) R Boutillier (France) A Sidorenko	6	3	[10]
(Bosnia and Herzegovina) A Šetkić (Serbia) Ilija Vučić	6^{3}	3
2	(Belgium) R Bemelmans (Spain) A Menéndez-Maceiras	7^{7}	6

Quarterfinals
1	(Germany) K Krawietz (France) A Olivetti	7	6
(Croatia) V Galović (Italy) A Massara	5	2
4	(Russia) A Igoshin (Russia) Y Sabanin	w/o
(Georgia (country)) A Metreveli (Belarus) D Zhyrmont
(Italy) F Gaio (Italy) A Vavassori	6^{10}	7	[5]
3	(Croatia) I Sabanov (Croatia) M Sabanov	7^{12}	5	[10]
(France) R Boutillier (France) A Sidorenko
2	(Belgium) R Bemelmans (Spain) A Menéndez-Maceiras	w/o

Semifinals
1	(Germany) K Krawietz (France) A Olivetti	7^{7}	3	[11]
4	(Russia) A Igoshin (Russia) Y Sabanin	6^{3}	6	[9]
3	(Croatia) I Sabanov (Croatia) M Sabanov	4	3
2	(Belgium) R Bemelmans (Spain) A Menéndez-Maceiras	6	6

Final
1	(Germany) K Krawietz (France) A Olivetti	6	7^{7}
2	(Belgium) R Bemelmans (Spain) A Menéndez-Maceiras	3	6^{4}
