= 2009 Guzzini Challenger =

- Date: July 20 – July 26
- Edition: 6th
- Location: Recanati, Italy

Champions

Singles
- (Switzerland) Stéphane Bohli

Doubles
- (Denmark) Frederik Nielsen / (Australia) Joseph Sirianni
← 2008 ·	Guzzini Challenger	· 2010 →

The 2009 Guzzini Challenger was a professional tennis tournament played on Hard courts. This was the sixth edition of the tournament which is part of the 2009 ATP Challenger Tour. It took place in Recanati, Italy between 20 July and 26 July 2009.

== ATP entrants ==
=== Seeds ===
Nationality	Player	Ranking*	Seeding
KAZ	Andrey Golubev	71	1
UKR	Sergiy Stakhovsky	84	2
SVK	Karol Beck	101	3
BRA	Thomaz Bellucci	141	4
ITA	Paolo Lorenzi	147	5
ITA	Tomas Tenconi	158	6
SUI	Stéphane Bohli	169	7
SVK	Lukáš Lacko	171	8

- Rankings are as of July 13, 2009.

=== Other entrants ===
The following players received wildcards into the singles main draw:

- (Italy) Daniele Bracciali
- (Italy) Giacomo Miccini
- (Italy) Federico Torresi

The following player received special exempt into the main draw:

- (Brazil) Thomaz Bellucci
- (Netherlands) Igor Sijsling

The following players received entry from the qualifying draw:

- (Switzerland) George Bastl (as a Lucky Loser)
- (Morocco) Rabie Chaki
- (Argentina) Federico del Bonis (as a Lucky Loser)
- (France) Jean-Noel Insausti
- (Italy) Gianluca Naso
- (Republic of Ireland) Louk Sorensen

== Champions ==
=== Singles ===
(Switzerland) Stéphane Bohli def. (Kazakhstan) Andrey Golubev, 6–4, 7–6(4)

=== Doubles ===
(Denmark) Frederik Nielsen / (Australia) Joseph Sirianni def. (Italy) Adriano Biasella / (Kazakhstan) Andrey Golubev, 6–4, 3–6, [10–6]
