= 2017 Guzzini Challenger =

- Date: 3–9 July
- Edition: 15th
- Surface: Hard
- Location: Recanati, Italy

Champions

Singles
- (Croatia) Viktor Galović

Doubles
- (France) Jonathan Eysseric / (France) Quentin Halys
← 2016 ·	Guzzini Challenger	· 2018 →

The 2017 Guzzini Challenger was a professional tennis tournament played on hard courts. It was the fifteenth edition of the tournament which was part of the 2017 ATP Challenger Tour. It took place in Recanati, Italy between 3 and 9 July 2017.

== Singles main-draw entrants ==
=== Seeds ===
Country	Player	Rank^{1}	Seed
ITA	Luca Vanni	121	1
FRA	Quentin Halys	139	2
ESP	Adrián Menéndez Maceiras	145	3
FRA	Kenny de Schepper	151	4
BIH	Mirza Bašić	163	5
BLR	Egor Gerasimov	166	6
ITA	Salvatore Caruso	198	7
BIH	Aldin Šetkić	199	8

- ^{1} Rankings are as of 26 June 2017.

=== Other entrants ===
The following players received wildcards into the singles main draw:

- (Italy) Edoardo Eremin
- (Italy) Gianluca Mager
- (Italy) Julian Ocleppo
- (Italy) Andrea Vavassori

The following players received entry from the qualifying draw:

- (Turkey) Altuğ Çelikbilek
- (Croatia) Viktor Galović
- (Russia) Evgeny Karlovskiy
- (Denmark) Frederik Nielsen

== Champions ==
=== Singles ===
- (Croatia) Viktor Galović def. (Bosnia and Herzegovina) Mirza Bašić 7–6^{(7–3)}, 6–4.

=== Doubles ===
- (France) Jonathan Eysseric / (France) Quentin Halys def. (Italy) Julian Ocleppo / (Italy) Andrea Vavassori 6–7^{(3–7)}, 6–4, [12–10].
