= 2019 Guzzini Challenger – Doubles =

Doubles
- 2019 Guzzini Challenger

Final
- Champions: (Portugal) Gonçalo Oliveira (India) Ramkumar Ramanathan
- Runners-up: (Italy) Andrea Vavassori (Spain) David Vega Hernández
- Score: 6–2, 6–4

Events
Singles	Doubles
- Guzzini Challenger

Gong Maoxin and Zhang Ze were the defending champions but chose not to defend their title.

Gonçalo Oliveira and Ramkumar Ramanathan won the title after defeating Andrea Vavassori and David Vega Hernández 6–2, 6–4 in the final.

== Seeds ==
1. (Chile) Hans Podlipnik Castillo / (Austria) Tristan-Samuel Weissborn (semifinals)
2. (Italy) Andrea Vavassori / (Spain) David Vega Hernández (final)
3. (Serbia) Nikola Čačić / (Switzerland) Luca Margaroli (first round)
4. (Portugal) Gonçalo Oliveira / (India) Ramkumar Ramanathan (champions)

== Draw ==
Key

- Q = Qualifier
- WC = Wild card
- LL = Lucky loser
- Alt = Alternate
- ITF = ITF entry
- PR = Protected ranking
- SR = Special ranking
- SE = Special exempt
- JE = Junior exempt
- JR = Junior Accelerator Programme entrant
- CO = College Accelerator Programme entrant
- NG = Next Gen Accelerator Program entrant
- w/o = Walkover
- r = Retired
- d = Defaulted

First round
1	(Chile) H Podlipnik Castillo (Austria) T-S Weissborn	w/o
(Croatia) V Galović (Italy) R Marcora
Alt	(Ukraine) I Marchenko (Austria) J Rodionov	7^{7}	7
(Belarus) E Gerasimov (Belarus) I Ivashka	6^{3}	5
4	(Portugal) G Oliveira (India) R Ramanathan	7^{8}	6
WC	(Italy) A Bega (Norway) V Durasovic	6^{6}	3
(Spain) E López Pérez (Spain) A Menéndez Maceiras	6	4	[11]
(Switzerland) M-A Hüsler (Venezuela) LD Martínez	2	6	[9]
ITF	(Italy) M Bortolotti (Peru) JP Varillas	7^{7}	7^{10}
ITF	(Italy) R Brancaccio (Spain) S Martos Gornés	6^{3}	6^{8}
(Ecuador) E Gómez (Ecuador) R Quiroz	7^{7}	6
3	(Serbia) N Čačić (Switzerland) L Margaroli	6^{2}	4
WC	(Italy) Emiliano Maggioli (Italy) Samuele Ramazzotti	4	6	[6]
WC	(Italy) E Dalla Valle (Italy) G Fonio	6	3	[10]
(France) K de Schepper (France) G Sakharov	2	4
2	(Italy) A Vavassori (Spain) D Vega Hernández	6	6

Quarterfinals
1	(Chile) H Podlipnik Castillo (Austria) T-S Weissborn	6	6
Alt	(Ukraine) I Marchenko (Austria) J Rodionov	2	4
4	(Portugal) G Oliveira (India) R Ramanathan	1	7^{8}	[10]
(Spain) E López Pérez (Spain) A Menéndez Maceiras	6	6^{6}	[8]
ITF	(Italy) M Bortolotti (Peru) JP Varillas	6	6
(Ecuador) E Gómez (Ecuador) R Quiroz	4	4
WC	(Italy) E Dalla Valle (Italy) G Fonio	4	4
2	(Italy) A Vavassori (Spain) D Vega Hernández	6	6

Semifinals
1	(Chile) H Podlipnik Castillo (Austria) T-S Weissborn	6^{5}	6	[8]
4	(Portugal) G Oliveira (India) R Ramanathan	7^{7}	4	[10]
ITF	(Italy) M Bortolotti (Peru) JP Varillas	3	2
2	(Italy) A Vavassori (Spain) D Vega Hernández	6	6

Final
4	(Portugal) G Oliveira (India) R Ramanathan	6	6
2	(Italy) A Vavassori (Spain) D Vega Hernández	2	4
