= 2017 Guzzini Challenger – Doubles =

Doubles
- 2017 Guzzini Challenger

Final
- Champions: (France) Jonathan Eysseric (France) Quentin Halys
- Runners-up: (Italy) Julian Ocleppo (Italy) Andrea Vavassori
- Score: 6–7^{(3–7)}, 6–4, [12–10]

Events
Singles	Doubles
← 2016 ·	Guzzini Challenger	· 2018 →

Kevin Krawietz and Albano Olivetti were the defending champions but chose not to defend their title.

Jonathan Eysseric and Quentin Halys won the title after defeating Julian Ocleppo and Andrea Vavassori 6–7^{(3–7)}, 6–4, [12–10] in the final.

== Seeds ==
1. (France) Jonathan Eysseric / (France) Quentin Halys (champions)
2. (Australia) Steven de Waard / (Japan) Ben McLachlan (semifinals)
3. (Croatia) Marin Draganja / (Croatia) Tomislav Draganja (semifinals)
4. (Poland) Tomasz Bednarek / (Netherlands) David Pel (first round)

== Draw ==
=== Key ===
- Q = Qualifier
- WC = Wild card
- LL = Lucky loser
- Alt = Alternate
- SE = Special exempt
- PR = Protected ranking
- ITF = ITF entry
- JE = Junior exempt
- w/o = Walkover
- r = Retired
- d = Defaulted
- SR = Special ranking

First round
1	(France) J Eysseric (France) Q Halys	6	5	[10]
(France) K de Schepper (Russia) A Kudryavtsev	3	7	[5]
WC	(Italy) S Caruso (Italy) W Trusendi	6	6
WC	(Italy) Edoardo Lamberti (Italy) Giorgio Portaluri	2	2
3	(Croatia) M Draganja (Croatia) T Draganja	6	2	[11]
(India) R Ramanathan (Bosnia and Herzegovina) A Šetkić	4	6	[9]
(Italy) A Arnaboldi (Denmark) F Nielsen	2	4
(Mexico) H Hach Verdugo (Spain) A Menéndez-Maceiras	6	6
Alt	(Turkey) A Çelikbilek (United States) John Lamble	w/o
(Belarus) E Gerasimov (Czech Republic) Petr Michnev
WC	(Italy) J Ocleppo (Italy) A Vavassori	6	6
4	(Poland) T Bednarek (Netherlands) D Pel	3	4
(Serbia) P Krstin (United States) A Lawson	1	6^{4}
PR	(Serbia) M Janković (Kazakhstan) D Popko	6	7^{7}
(Bosnia and Herzegovina) M Bašić (Belgium) Y Mertens	2	3
2	(Australia) S de Waard (Japan) B McLachlan	6	6

Quarterfinals
1	(France) J Eysseric (France) Q Halys	6	0	[11]
WC	(Italy) S Caruso (Italy) W Trusendi	1	6	[9]
3	(Croatia) M Draganja (Croatia) T Draganja	6	6
(Mexico) H Hach Verdugo (Spain) A Menéndez-Maceiras	2	3
Alt	(Turkey) A Çelikbilek (United States) J Lamble	6	4	[8]
WC	(Italy) J Ocleppo (Italy) A Vavassori	3	6	[10]
PR	(Serbia) M Janković (Kazakhstan) D Popko
2	(Australia) S de Waard (Japan) B McLachlan	w/o

Semifinals
1	(France) J Eysseric (France) Q Halys	7^{7}	7^{7}
3	(Croatia) M Draganja (Croatia) T Draganja	6^{5}	6^{5}
WC	(Italy) J Ocleppo (Italy) A Vavassori	7^{7}	6
2	(Australia) S de Waard (Japan) B McLachlan	6^{4}	3

Final
1	(France) J Eysseric (France) Q Halys	6^{3}	6	[12]
WC	(Italy) J Ocleppo (Italy) A Vavassori	7^{7}	4	[10]
