= 2015 Guzzini Challenger – Singles =

Singles
- 2015 Guzzini Challenger

Final
- Champion: (Bosnia and Herzegovina) Mirza Bašić
- Runner-up: (Lithuania) Ričardas Berankis
- Score: 6–4, 3–6, 7–6^{(7–4)}

Events
Singles	Doubles
← 2014 ·	Guzzini Challenger	· 2016 →

Gilles Müller was the defending champion, but he did not participate in 2015.

Mirza Bašić won the title defeating Ričardas Berankis in the final, 6–4, 3–6, 7–6^{(7–4)}.

== Seeds ==
1. (Lithuania) Ričardas Berankis (final)
2. (Belgium) Ruben Bemelmans (quarterfinals)
3. (Poland) Michał Przysiężny (semifinals)
4. (Russia) Alexander Kudryavtsev (first round)
5. (Germany) Peter Gojowczyk (second round)
6. (Japan) Hiroki Moriya (first round)
7. (Belgium) Niels Desein (first round, retired)
8. (Hungary) Márton Fucsovics (semifinals)

== Draw ==
=== Key ===
- Q = Qualifier
- WC = Wild card
- LL = Lucky loser
- Alt = Alternate
- SE = Special exempt
- PR = Protected ranking
- ITF = ITF entry
- JE = Junior exempt
- w/o = Walkover
- r = Retired
- d = Defaulted
- SR = Special ranking

=== Finals ===
Semifinals
1	(Lithuania) Ričardas Berankis	6	6
8	(Hungary) Márton Fucsovics	4	3
3	(Poland) Michał Przysiężny	4	6	1
(Bosnia and Herzegovina) Mirza Bašić	6	3	6

Final
1	(Lithuania) Ričardas Berankis	4	6	6^{4}
(Bosnia and Herzegovina) Mirza Bašić	6	3	7^{7}

=== Top half ===
First round
1	(Lithuania) R Berankis	5	6	6
Q	(France) Sébastien Boltz	7	2	2
WC	(Italy) S Napolitano	0	4
(France) D Guez	6	6
(Egypt) M Safwat	1	6	6^{7}
Q	(Serbia) I Bozoljac	6	3	7^{9}
SE	(Italy) S Caruso	2	6	2
7	(Belgium) N Desein	6	0	0^{r}
4	(Russia) A Kudryavtsev	3	5
(Bulgaria) A Lazov	6	7
(China) D Wu	6	5	3
(Belgium) Y Mertens	2	7	6
WC	(Italy) M Berrettini	4	3
Q	(Italy) F Cipolla	6	6
(United States) Connor Smith	2	2
8	(Hungary) M Fucsovics	6	6

Second round
1	(Lithuania) R Berankis	6	6
(France) D Guez	4	3
Q	(Serbia) I Bozoljac	3	2
SE	(Italy) S Caruso	6	6
(Bulgaria) A Lazov	0	3
(Belgium) Y Mertens	6	6
Q	(Italy) F Cipolla	6	4	5
8	(Hungary) M Fucsovics	2	6	7

Quarterfinals
1	(Lithuania) R Berankis	6	6
SE	(Italy) S Caruso	1	3
(Belgium) Y Mertens	4	4
8	(Hungary) M Fucsovics	6	6

Semifinals
1	(Lithuania) R Berankis	6	6
8	(Hungary) M Fucsovics	4	3

=== Bottom half ===
First round
6	(Japan) H Moriya	5	6	6^{7}
(United Kingdom) J Milton	7	2	7^{9}
WC	(Italy) Edoardo Eremin	6	6
Q	(United States) J Witten	3	1
(France) R Boutillier	6^{0}	3
(Brazil) Henrique Cunha	7^{7}	6
LL	(China) C Wang	0	7	3
3	(Poland) M Przysiężny	6	5	6
5	(Germany) P Gojowczyk	7	6
Alt	(France) Q Halys	5	2
(Bosnia and Herzegovina) M Bašić	6	6
(Serbia) M Zekić	4	2
(Belarus) D Zhyrmont	6	6
WC	(Italy) Giacomo Miccini	2	2
(Spain) D Pérez Sanz	2	2
2	(Belgium) R Bemelmans	6	6

Second round
(United Kingdom) J Milton	3	6	6
WC	(Italy) E Eremin	6	1	3
(Brazil) H Cunha	1	4
3	(Poland) M Przysiężny	6	6
5	(Germany) P Gojowczyk	6^{6}	3
(Bosnia and Herzegovina) M Bašić	7^{8}	6
(Belarus) D Zhyrmont	2	4
2	(Belgium) R Bemelmans	6	6

Quarterfinals
(United Kingdom) J Milton	3	6^{3}
3	(Poland) M Przysiężny	6	7^{7}
(Bosnia and Herzegovina) M Bašić	4	6	6
2	(Belgium) R Bemelmans	6	3	2

Semifinals
3	(Poland) M Przysiężny	4	6	1
(Bosnia and Herzegovina) M Bašić	6	3	6
