= 2011 Guzzini Challenger – Doubles =

Doubles
- 2011 Guzzini Challenger

Final
- Champions: (Denmark) Frederik Nielsen (United Kingdom) Ken Skupski
- Runners-up: (Italy) Federico Gaio (India) Purav Raja
- Score: 6–4, 7–5

Events
Singles	Doubles
← 2010 ·	Guzzini Challenger	· 2012 →

Jamie Delgado and Lovro Zovko were the defending champions, but decided not to participate.
Frederik Nielsen and Ken Skupski won the title, defeating Federico Gaio and Purav Raja 6–4, 7–5 in the final.

== Seeds ==
1. (Denmark) Frederik Nielsen / (United Kingdom) Ken Skupski (champions)
2. (Argentina) Federico Delbonis / (Spain) Gerard Granollers (first round)
3. (France) Kenny de Schepper / (France) Fabrice Martin (semifinals)
4. (Belgium) Ruben Bemelmans / (Netherlands) Igor Sijsling (semifinals)

== Draw ==
=== Key ===
- Q = Qualifier
- WC = Wild card
- LL = Lucky loser
- Alt = Alternate
- SE = Special exempt
- PR = Protected ranking
- ITF = ITF entry
- JE = Junior exempt
- w/o = Walkover
- r = Retired
- d = Defaulted
- SR = Special ranking

=== Draw ===
First round
1	(Denmark) F Nielsen (United Kingdom) K Skupski	6	6
(Moldova) R Albot (Ukraine) A Smirnov	2	4
(Republic of Ireland) J Cluskey (Slovakia) M Mečíř Jr.	3	4
(Australia) B Klein (Australia) J Lemke	6	6
4	(Belgium) R Bemelmans (Netherlands) I Sijsling	6	7^{7}
(Netherlands) M Middelkoop (Australia) J Sirianni	4	6^{5}
(France) G Burquier (Czech Republic) J Minář	6	3	[9]
(Slovenia) David Lenar (Slovenia) G Žemlja	3	6	[11]
(Italy) G Di Meo (Italy) S Ianni	1	4
(Canada) Pavel Krainik (Mexico) M Sánchez	6	6
(Croatia) N Mektić (Croatia) Marin Milan	1	2
3	(France) K de Schepper (France) F Martin	6	6
(Spain) Carlos Gómez-Herrera (Spain) Pablo Martín-Adalia	6	6
(Italy) Enrico Becuzzi (Italy) P Lorenzi	2	1
(Italy) Federico Gaio (India) P Raja	2	6	[10]
2	(Argentina) F Delbonis (Spain) G Granollers	6	4	[6]

Quarterfinals
1	(Denmark) F Nielsen (United Kingdom) K Skupski	6	6
(Australia) B Klein (Australia) J Lemke	3	4
4	(Belgium) R Bemelmans (Netherlands) I Sijsling	6	7^{7}
(Slovenia) D Lenar (Slovenia) G Žemlja	4	6^{5}
(Canada) P Krainik (Mexico) M Sánchez	3	3
3	(France) K de Schepper (France) F Martin	6	6
(Spain) C Gómez-Herrera (Spain) P Martín-Adalia	3	2
(Italy) F Gaio (India) P Raja	6	6

Semifinals
1	(Denmark) F Nielsen (United Kingdom) K Skupski	7^{7}	6
4	(Belgium) R Bemelmans (Netherlands) I Sijsling	6^{5}	4
3	(France) K de Schepper (France) F Martin	4	5
(Italy) F Gaio (India) P Raja	6	7

Final
1	(Denmark) F Nielsen (United Kingdom) K Skupski	6	7
(Italy) F Gaio (India) P Raja	4	5
