= 2016 Guzzini Challenger =

- Date: 18–24 July
- Edition: 14th
- Surface: Hard
- Location: Recanati, Italy

Champions

Singles
- (Ukraine) Illya Marchenko

Doubles
- (Germany) Kevin Krawietz / (France) Albano Olivetti
| ← 2015 · | Guzzini Challenger | · 2017 → |

The 2016 Guzzini Challenger was a professional tennis tournament played on hard courts. It was the fourteenth edition of the tournament which was part of the 2016 ATP Challenger Tour. It took place in Recanati, Italy between 18 and 24 July 2016.

== Singles main-draw entrants ==
=== Seeds ===
| Country | Player | Rank^{1} | Seed |
|---|---|---|---|
| RUS | Evgeny Donskoy | 79 | 1 |
| UKR | Illya Marchenko | 84 | 2 |
| HUN | Márton Fucsovics | 165 | 3 |
| COL | Eduardo Struvay | 168 | 4 |
| BEL | Ruben Bemelmans | 177 | 5 |
| ITA | Luca Vanni | 178 | 6 |
| RUS | Andrey Rublev | 193 | 7 |
| BIH | Aldin Šetkić | 207 | 8 |

- ^{1} Rankings are as of July 11, 2016.

=== Other entrants ===
The following players received wildcards into the singles main draw:

- (Italy) Riccardo Bonadio
- (Italy) Andrea Vavassori
- (Russia) Andrey Rublev
- (Italy) Antonio Massara

The following players entered the singles main draw with a protected ranking:

- (France) Albano Olivetti

The following player entered the singles main draw as a special exempt:

- (Italy) Gianluca Mager

The following players received entry from the qualifying draw:

- (Croatia) Viktor Galović
- (Russia) Alexander Bublik
- (Croatia) Mate Delić
- (Croatia) Filip Veger

The following player entered as a lucky losers:

- (Belarus) Dzmitry Zhyrmont
- (France) Rémi Boutillier

== Doubles main-draw entrants ==
=== Seeds ===
| Country | Player | Country | Player | Rank^{1} | Seed |
|---|---|---|---|---|---|
| GER | Kevin Krawietz | FRA | Albano Olivetti | 411 | 1 |
| BEL | Ruben Bemelmans | ESP | Adrián Menéndez Maceiras | 453 | 2 |
| CRO | Ivan Sabanov | CRO | Matej Sabanov | 454 | 3 |
| RUS | Alexandr Igoshin | RUS | Yan Sabanin | 608 | 4 |

- ^{1} Rankings are as of July 11, 2016.

=== Other entrants ===
The following pairs received entry as wildcards:

- (Italy) Edoardo Lamberti / (Italy) Panide Mangiaterra
- (United States) Sam Barnett / (United States) Jesse Witten

== Champions ==
=== Singles ===
- (Ukraine) Illya Marchenko def. (Belarus) Ilya Ivashka, 6–4, 6–4

=== Doubles ===
- (Germany) Kevin Krawietz / (France) Albano Olivetti def. (Belgium) Ruben Bemelmans / (Spain) Adrián Menéndez Maceiras, 6–3, 7–6^{(7–4)}
