= 2015 Guzzini Challenger – Doubles =

Doubles
- 2015 Guzzini Challenger

Final
- Champions: (India) Divij Sharan (United Kingdom) Ken Skupski
- Runners-up: (Serbia) Ilija Bozoljac (Italy) Flavio Cipolla
- Score: 4–6, 7–6^{(7–3)}, [10–6]

Events
Singles	Doubles
← 2014 ·	Guzzini Challenger	· 2016 →

Ilija Bozoljac and Goran Tošić was the defending champion, but Tošić did not participate this year. Bozoljac played alongside Flavio Cipolla, but lost the final against Divij Sharan and Ken Skupski, 6–4, 6–7^{(3–7)}, [6–10].

== Seeds ==
1. (Mexico) César Ramírez / (Mexico) Miguel Ángel Reyes-Varela (first round)
2. (India) Divij Sharan / (United Kingdom) Ken Skupski (champions)
3. (Thailand) Sanchai Ratiwatana / (Thailand) Sonchat Ratiwatana (quarterfinals)
4. (Serbia) Ilija Bozoljac / (Italy) Flavio Cipolla (final)

== Draw ==
=== Key ===
- Q = Qualifier
- WC = Wild card
- LL = Lucky loser
- Alt = Alternate
- SE = Special exempt
- PR = Protected ranking
- ITF = ITF entry
- JE = Junior exempt
- w/o = Walkover
- r = Retired
- d = Defaulted
- SR = Special ranking

First round
1	(Mexico) C Ramírez (Mexico) MÁ Reyes-Varela	7^{7}	2	[10]
(Belgium) R Bemelmans (Belgium) Y Mertens	6^{4}	6	[12]
(Russia) A Kudryavtsev (Belarus) D Zhyrmont	6	6
(Romania) Alexandru-Daniel Carpen (Serbia) Ilija Vučić	2	4
4	(Serbia) I Bozoljac (Italy) F Cipolla	6	6
(France) R Boutillier (France) D Guez	4	3
(France) Q Halys (Italy) Matteo Volante	4	6^{1}
(Brazil) Henrique Cunha (United States) Connor Smith	6	7^{7}
WC	(Italy) M Berrettini (Italy) Edoardo Eremin	7	7^{10}
(United Kingdom) J Milton (China) D Wu	5	6^{8}
WC	(United States) Sam Barnett (United States) J Witten	2	1
3	(Thailand) Sa Ratiwatana (Thailand) So Ratiwatana	6	6
WC	(Italy) S Caruso (Italy) S Napolitano	7	2
(Italy) R Ghedin (Japan) H Moriya	5	2
(Egypt) M Safwat (Austria) T-S Weissborn	3	4
2	(India) D Sharan (United Kingdom) K Skupski	6	6

Quarterfinals
(Belgium) R Bemelmans (Belgium) Y Mertens	w/o
(Russia) A Kudryavtsev (Belarus) D Zhyrmont
4	(Serbia) I Bozoljac (Italy) F Cipolla	7^{7}	2	[10]
(Brazil) H Cunha (United States) C Smith	6^{5}	6	[6]
WC	(Italy) M Berrettini (Italy) E Eremin	4	7	[10]
3	(Thailand) Sa Ratiwatana (Thailand) So Ratiwatana	6	5	[7]
WC	(Italy) S Caruso (Italy) S Napolitano	6^{4}	2
2	(India) D Sharan (United Kingdom) K Skupski	7^{7}	6

Semifinals
(Belgium) R Bemelmans (Belgium) Y Mertens	2	4
4	(Serbia) I Bozoljac (Italy) F Cipolla	6	6
WC	(Italy) M Berrettini (Italy) E Eremin	2	4
2	(India) D Sharan (United Kingdom) K Skupski	6	6

Final
4	(Serbia) I Bozoljac (Italy) F Cipolla	6	6^{3}	[6]
2	(India) D Sharan (United Kingdom) K Skupski	4	7^{7}	[10]
