= 2014 Guzzini Challenger – Doubles =

Professional tennis tournament

Doubles
- 2014 Guzzini Challenger

Final
- Champions: (Serbia) Ilija Bozoljac (Serbia) Goran Tošić
- Runners-up: (Republic of Ireland) James Cluskey (Lithuania) Laurynas Grigelis
- Score: 5–7, 6–4, [10–5]

Events
Singles	Doubles
← 2013 ·	Guzzini Challenger	· 2015 →

The 2014 Guzzini Challenger Doubles was a professional tennis tournament. Ken Skupski and Neal Skupski were the defending champions but decided not to participate.

Ilija Bozoljac and Goran Tošić won the final, beating James Cluskey and Laurynas Grigelis 5–7, 6–4, [10–5]

== Seeds ==
1. (Argentina) Guillermo Durán / (Argentina) Máximo González (first round)
2. (Uruguay) Ariel Behar / (Italy) Alessandro Motti (quarterfinals)
3. (United Kingdom) Jamie Delgado / (Luxembourg) Gilles Müller (quarterfinals)
4. (Russia) Victor Baluda / (Peru) Sergio Galdós (semifinals)

== Draw ==
=== Key ===
- Q = Qualifier
- WC = Wild card
- LL = Lucky loser
- Alt = Alternate
- SE = Special exempt
- PR = Protected ranking
- ITF = ITF entry
- JE = Junior exempt
- w/o = Walkover
- r = Retired
- d = Defaulted
- SR = Special ranking

=== Draw ===
First round
1	(Argentina) G Durán (Argentina) E Schwank	6	4	[7]
(Belarus) E Gerasimov (Russia) A Lobkov	3	6	[10]
WC	(Italy) S Caruso (Italy) S Napolitano	1	2
(Serbia) I Bozoljac (Serbia) G Tošić	6	6
4	(Russia) V Baluda (Peru) S Galdós	6	6
(Peru) D Beretta (Hungary) M Fucsovics	4	3
WC	(Italy) Edoardo Castagna (Italy) Paride Mangiaterra	3	1
PR	(Lithuania) R Berankis (Ukraine) S Bubka	6	6
Alt	(Spain) D Muñoz de la Nava (Spain) R Ortega-Olmedo	1	5
WC	(Italy) Lorenzo Frigerio (Italy) M Trevisan	6	7
(Austria) S Bader (United States) V Mirzadeh	2	5
3	(United Kingdom) J Delgado (Luxembourg) G Müller	6	7
(Republic of Ireland) J Cluskey (Lithuania) L Grigelis	7	7
(Italy) F Cipolla (Spain) A Menéndez-Maceiras	5	5
(Italy) Francesco Borgo (Australia) D Propoggia	6^{9}	7	[4]
2	(Uruguay) A Behar (Italy) A Motti	7^{11}	5	[10]

Quarterfinals
(Belarus) E Gerasimov (Russia) A Lobkov	4	4
(Serbia) I Bozoljac (Serbia) G Tošić	6	6
4	(Russia) V Baluda (Peru) S Galdós	6	2	[10]
PR	(Lithuania) R Berankis (Ukraine) S Bubka	2	6	[5]
WC	(Italy) L Frigerio (Italy) M Trevisan	6^{5}	6	[10]
3	(United Kingdom) J Delgado (Luxembourg) G Müller	7^{7}	3	[7]
(Republic of Ireland) J Cluskey (Lithuania) L Grigelis	6	1	[10]
2	(Uruguay) A Behar (Italy) A Motti	3	6	[7]

Semifinals
(Serbia) I Bozoljac (Serbia) G Tošić	7^{8}	6
4	(Russia) V Baluda (Peru) S Galdós	6^{6}	3
WC	(Italy) L Frigerio (Italy) M Trevisan	6^{4}	6^{5}
(Republic of Ireland) J Cluskey (Lithuania) L Grigelis	7^{7}	7^{7}

Final
(Serbia) I Bozoljac (Serbia) G Tošić	5	6	[10]
(Republic of Ireland) J Cluskey (Lithuania) L Grigelis	7	4	[5]
