= 2014 Guzzini Challenger – Singles =

Singles
- 2014 Guzzini Challenger

Final
- Champion: (Luxembourg) Gilles Müller
- Runner-up: (Serbia) Ilija Bozoljac
- Score: 6–1, 6–2

Events
| Singles | Doubles |
| ← 2013 · | Guzzini Challenger | · 2015 → |

Thomas Fabbiano was the defending champion, but chose not to compete.

Gilles Müller won the title, defeating Ilija Bozoljac 6–1, 6–2 in the final.

== Seeds ==
1. (Luxembourg) Gilles Müller (champion)
2. (Lithuania) Ričardas Berankis (first round)
3. (Slovakia) Andrej Martin (withdrew)
4. (Hungary) Márton Fucsovics (semifinals)
5. (Spain) Adrián Menéndez Maceiras (quarterfinals)
6. (France) David Guez (first round)
7. (Russia) Konstantin Kravchuk (semifinals)
8. (Serbia) Ilija Bozoljac (final)
9. (Georgia (country)) Nikoloz Basilashvili (first round)

== Draw ==
=== Key ===
- Q = Qualifier
- WC = Wild card
- LL = Lucky loser
- Alt = Alternate
- SE = Special exempt
- PR = Protected ranking
- ITF = ITF entry
- JE = Junior exempt
- w/o = Walkover
- r = Retired
- d = Defaulted
- SR = Special ranking

=== Finals ===
Semifinals
1 | (Luxembourg) Gilles Müller | 7 | 7^{7}
7 | (Russia) Konstantin Kravchuk | 5 | 6^{5}
4 | (Hungary) Márton Fucsovics | 6^{4} | 3
8 | (Serbia) Ilija Bozoljac | 7^{7} | 6

Final
1 | (Luxembourg) Gilles Müller | 6 | 6
8 | (Serbia) Ilija Bozoljac | 1 | 2

=== Top half ===
First round
1 | (Luxembourg) G Müller | 6 | 6
(Lithuania) L Grigelis | 3 | 3
WC | (Italy) Antonio Massara | 4 | 1
Q | (Croatia) F Veger | 6 | 6
(Belgium) Y Mertens | 3 | 6 | 4
WC | (Italy) S Caruso | 6 | 2 | 6
Q | (Peru) D Beretta | 6 | 7
6 | (France) D Guez | 4 | 5
9 | (Georgia (country)) N Basilashvili | 3 | 7^{7} | 2
(Croatia) M Pavić | 6 | 6^{2} | 6
WC | (Italy) S Napolitano | 7 | 6
Q | (Argentina) G Durán | 5 | 4
(Czech Republic) Michal Konečný | 6 | 6^{2} | 1^{r}
(Spain) R Ortega Olmedo | 3 | 7^{7} | 3
WC | (Italy) Giacomo Miccini | 3 | 2
7 | (Russia) K Kravchuk | 6 | 6

Second round
1 | (Luxembourg) G Müller | 6 | 6
Q | (Croatia) F Veger | 3 | 4
WC | (Italy) S Caruso | 6 | 6
Q | (Peru) D Beretta | 0 | 2
(Croatia) M Pavić | 4 | 7 | 4
WC | (Italy) S Napolitano | 6 | 5 | 6
(Spain) R Ortega Olmedo | 4 | 4
7 | (Russia) K Kravchuk | 6 | 6

Quarterfinals
1 | (Luxembourg) G Müller | 6 | 7^{7}
WC | (Italy) S Caruso | 1 | 6^{3}
WC | (Italy) S Napolitano | 6^{3} | 3
7 | (Russia) K Kravchuk | 7^{7} | 6

Semifinals
1 | (Luxembourg) G Müller | 7 | 7^{7}
7 | (Russia) K Kravchuk | 5 | 6^{5}

=== Bottom half ===
First round
5 | (Spain) A Menéndez Maceiras | 6 | 6
(Croatia) N Mektić | 4 | 2
Q | (Russia) V Baluda | 6 | 6
(Argentina) E Schwank | 2 | 4
(Italy) F Cipolla | 6 | 6
PR | (Ukraine) S Bubka | 2 | 0
(Italy) M Trevisan | 1 | 6^{5}
4 | (Hungary) M Fucsovics | 6 | 7^{7}
8 | (Serbia) I Bozoljac | 6 | 6
(Belarus) E Gerasimov | 4 | 2
(United Kingdom) K Edmund | 6 | 6
(Italy) Marc Giner | 1 | 4
LL | (Bosnia and Herzegovina) T Brkić | 6 | 5 | 2
(Russia) A Lobkov | 4 | 7 | 6
(Spain) D Muñoz de la Nava | 7 | 7^{7}
2 | (Lithuania) R Berankis | 5 | 6^{3}

Second round
5 | (Spain) A Menéndez Maceiras | 6 | 6
Q | (Russia) V Baluda | 3 | 0
(Italy) F Cipolla | 1 | 6 | 6^{5}
4 | (Hungary) M Fucsovics | 6 | 4 | 7^{7}
8 | (Serbia) I Bozoljac | 6 | 6
(United Kingdom) K Edmund | 3 | 3
(Russia) A Lobkov | 2 | 2
(Spain) D Muñoz de la Nava | 6 | 6

Quarterfinals
5 | (Spain) A Menéndez Maceiras | 4 | 2
4 | (Hungary) M Fucsovics | 6 | 6
8 | (Serbia) I Bozoljac | 6 | 6
(Spain) D Muñoz de la Nava | 4 | 3

Semifinals
4 | (Hungary) M Fucsovics | 6^{4} | 3
8 | (Serbia) I Bozoljac | 7^{7} | 6
