= 2010 Guzzini Challenger – Singles =

Singles
- 2010 Guzzini Challenger

Final
- Champion: (Switzerland) Stéphane Bohli
- Runner-up: (France) Adrian Mannarino
- Score: 6–0, 3–6, 7–6(5)

Events
Singles	Doubles
← 2009 ·	Guzzini Challenger	· 2011 →

Stéphane Bohli successfully defended his title, beating Adrian Mannarino in the final 6–0, 3–6, 7–6(5).

== Seeds ==
1. (France) David Guez (quarterfinals)
2. (Switzerland) Stéphane Bohli (champion)
3. (Czech Republic) Jan Hernych (second round)
4. (France) Josselin Ouanna (semifinals)
5. (Netherlands) Igor Sijsling (first round)
6. (Belgium) Niels Desein (first round)
7. (Belgium) Ruben Bemelmans (first round)
8. (Spain) Guillermo Alcaide (first round)

== Draw ==
=== Key ===
- Q = Qualifier
- WC = Wild card
- LL = Lucky loser
- Alt = Alternate
- SE = Special exempt
- PR = Protected ranking
- ITF = ITF entry
- JE = Junior exempt
- w/o = Walkover
- r = Retired
- d = Defaulted
- SR = Special ranking

=== Finals ===
Semifinals
(France) Adrian Mannarino	6	6
(France) Charles-Antoine Brézac	4	3
4	(France) Josselin Ouanna	4	2
2	(Switzerland) Stéphane Bohli	6	6

Final
(France) Adrian Mannarino	0	6	6^{5}
2	(Switzerland) Stéphane Bohli	6	3	7

=== Top half ===
First round
1	(France) D Guez	6	0	6
(Croatia) R Karanušić	2	6	0
(Italy) S Galvani	4	6	5
WC	(Italy) F Torresi	6	4	7
(France) A Mannarino	6	6
WC	(Italy) A Giannessi	3	3
(Switzerland) M Lammer	6	7
6	(Belgium) N Desein	1	6^{5}
3	(Czech Republic) J Hernych	6	6
(New Zealand) D King-Turner	0	4
Q	(France) A Renard	2	7	4
(Italy) R Ghedin	6	6^{10}	6
(Spain) P Clar-Rosselló	4	4
(France) C-A Brézac	6	6
Q	(Lithuania) L Grigelis	2	6	6
5	(Netherlands) I Sijsling	6	3	1

Second round
1	(France) D Guez	7	6
WC	(Italy) F Torresi	6^{2}	2
(France) A Mannarino	6	6
(Switzerland) M Lammer	1	4
3	(Czech Republic) J Hernych	3	5
(Italy) R Ghedin	6	7
(France) C-A Brézac	6	6
Q	(Lithuania) L Grigelis	3	3

Quarterfinals
1	(France) D Guez	4	2
(France) A Mannarino	6	6
(Italy) R Ghedin	6^{3}	3
(France) C-A Brézac	7	6

Semifinals
(France) A Mannarino	6	6
(France) C-A Brézac	4	3

=== Bottom half ===
First round
8	(Spain) G Alcaide	5	4
(Montenegro) G Tošić	7	6
WC	(Italy) G Miccini	5	3
(Slovakia) I Klec	7	6
WC	(Italy) A Stoppini	6	6
(Romania) M Copil	2	2
(Belgium) Y Mertens	7	4	6^{5}
4	(France) J Ouanna	6^{1}	6	7
7	(Belgium) R Bemelmans	6^{5}	6	2
(Portugal) J Sousa	7	3	6
Q	(France) O Charroin	6	6^{5}	3
(Portugal) L Tavares	4	7	6
(Spain) S Gutiérrez-Ferrol	4	6^{2}
(Italy) D Giorgini	6	7
Q	(Switzerland) G Bastl	6^{2}	3
2	(Switzerland) S Bohli	7	6

Second round
(Montenegro) G Tošić	6	1	6^{7}
(Slovakia) I Klec	4	6	7
WC	(Italy) A Stoppini	3	3
4	(France) J Ouanna	6	6
(Portugal) J Sousa	6^{5}	4
(Portugal) L Tavares	7	6
(Italy) D Giorgini	4	1
2	(Switzerland) S Bohli	6	6

Quarterfinals
(Slovakia) I Klec	6^{5}	6	4
4	(France) J Ouanna	7	4	6
(Portugal) L Tavares	6	2	3
2	(Switzerland) S Bohli	4	6	6

Semifinals
4	(France) J Ouanna	4	2
2	(Switzerland) S Bohli	6	6
