= 2012 Guzzini Challenger – Singles =

Singles
- 2012 Guzzini Challenger

Final
- Champion: (Italy) Simone Bolelli
- Runner-up: (France) Fabrice Martin
- Score: 6–3, 6–2

Events
Singles	Doubles
← 2011 ·	Guzzini Challenger	· 2013 →

Fabrice Martin was the defending champion, but was defeated by Simone Bolelli 6–3, 6–2 in the final.

== Seeds ==
1. (Tunisia) Malek Jaziri (second round)
2. (Slovakia) Karol Beck (first round)
3. (France) Florent Serra (quarterfinals)
4. (Italy) Simone Bolelli (champion)
5. (Canada) Peter Polansky (second round)
6. (Spain) Adrián Menéndez (quarterfinals)
7. (France) Kenny de Schepper (semifinals)
8. (Italy) Gianluca Naso (first round)

== Draw ==
=== Key ===
- Q = Qualifier
- WC = Wild card
- LL = Lucky loser
- Alt = Alternate
- SE = Special exempt
- PR = Protected ranking
- ITF = ITF entry
- JE = Junior exempt
- w/o = Walkover
- r = Retired
- d = Defaulted
- SR = Special ranking

=== Finals ===
Semifinals
WC	(Kazakhstan) Evgeny Korolev	3	6	2
4	(Italy) Simone Bolelli	6	3	6
7	(France) Kenny de Schepper	4	5
(France) Fabrice Martin	6	7

Final
4	(Italy) Simone Bolelli	6	6
(France) Fabrice Martin	3	2

=== Top half ===
First round
1	(Tunisia) M Jaziri	6	6
Q	(United Kingdom) D Cox	2	3
WC	(Kazakhstan) E Korolev	4	6	6
(Croatia) D Marcan	6	2	0
(Italy) D Giorgini	4	6^{4}
(Czech Republic) J Pospíšil	6	7^{7}
WC	(Italy) Giacomo Miccini	3	3
6	(Spain) A Menéndez	6	6
4	(Italy) S Bolelli	7^{9}	7
(Czech Republic) J Minář	6^{7}	5
(France) Julien Obry	2	6	6
(Australia) J Lemke	6	2	3
Q	(Australia) D Propoggia	6	6
WC	(Italy) Marco Cecchinato	4	3
Q	(Croatia) M Draganja	7^{8}	7^{8}
8	(Italy) G Naso	6^{6}	6^{6}

Second round
1	(Tunisia) M Jaziri	4	2
WC	(Kazakhstan) E Korolev	6	6
(Czech Republic) J Pospíšil	4	6^{4}
6	(Spain) A Menéndez	6	7^{7}
4	(Italy) S Bolelli	6	6
(France) Julien Obry	3	2
Q	(Australia) D Propoggia	6	7^{7}
Q	(Croatia) M Draganja	4	6^{3}

Quarterfinals
WC	(Kazakhstan) E Korolev	7^{7}	4	6
6	(Spain) A Menéndez	6^{4}	6	3
4	(Italy) S Bolelli	6	6
Q	(Australia) D Propoggia	4	4

Semifinals
WC	(Kazakhstan) E Korolev	3	6	2
4	(Italy) S Bolelli	6	3	6

=== Bottom half ===
First round
7	(France) K de Schepper	6	6
WC	(Italy) Federico Torresi	2	3
(United States) D Zivkovic	5	6^{4}
Q	(Australia) Chris Letcher	7	7^{7}
(Croatia) N Mektić	6	6
(Italy) L Vanni	2	4
(Italy) Claudio Grassi	2	3
3	(France) F Serra	6	6
5	(Canada) P Polansky	4	6	6
(Australia) B Klein	6	3	3
(Serbia) B Pašanski	1	2
(France) A Olivetti	6	6
(Austria) G Melzer	3	1
(Italy) S Galvani	6	6
(France) F Martin	6	6
2	(Slovakia) K Beck	3	1

Second round
7	(France) K de Schepper	6	6
Q	(Australia) Chris Letcher	3	2
(Croatia) N Mektić	3	4
3	(France) F Serra	6	6
5	(Canada) P Polansky	6	2	6^{3}
(France) A Olivetti	4	6	7^{7}
(Italy) S Galvani	6	6^{4}	3
(France) F Martin	3	7^{7}	6

Quarterfinals
7	(France) K de Schepper	4	6	6
3	(France) F Serra	6	3	4
(France) A Olivetti	4	6^{1}
(France) F Martin	6	7^{7}

Semifinals
7	(France) K de Schepper	4	5
(France) F Martin	6	7
