= 2019 Guzzini Challenger – Singles =

Singles
- 2019 Guzzini Challenger

Final
- Champion: (Belarus) Egor Gerasimov
- Runner-up: (Italy) Roberto Marcora
- Score: 6–2, 7–5

Events
Singles	Doubles
- Guzzini Challenger

Daniel Brands was the defending champion but chose not to defend his title.

Egor Gerasimov won the title after defeating Roberto Marcora 6–2, 7–5 in the final.

== Seeds ==
All seeds receive a bye into the second round.

1. (Germany) Matthias Bachinger (third round)
2. (Russia) Evgeny Donskoy (second round)
3. (Italy) Lorenzo Giustino (second round)
4. (Ukraine) Sergiy Stakhovsky (third round)
5. (Belarus) Ilya Ivashka (second round)
6. (Slovakia) Lukáš Lacko (semifinals)
7. (Spain) Adrián Menéndez Maceiras (second round)
8. (Italy) Filippo Baldi (second round)
9. (India) Ramkumar Ramanathan (quarterfinals)
10. (Belarus) Egor Gerasimov (champion)
11. (Italy) Stefano Napolitano (second round)
12. (Ecuador) Emilio Gómez (third round)
13. (Croatia) Viktor Galović (quarterfinals)
14. (Bosnia and Herzegovina) Mirza Bašić (second round)
15. (Germany) Mats Moraing (semifinals)
16. (Spain) Enrique López Pérez (second round)

== Draw ==
Key

- Q = Qualifier
- WC = Wild card
- LL = Lucky loser
- Alt = Alternate
- ITF = ITF entry
- PR = Protected ranking
- SR = Special ranking
- SE = Special exempt
- JE = Junior exempt
- JR = Junior Accelerator Programme entrant
- CO = College Accelerator Programme entrant
- NG = Next Gen Accelerator Program entrant
- w/o = Walkover
- r = Retired
- d = Defaulted

=== Finals ===
Quarterfinals
(Italy) Roberto Marcora	7	6^{5}	7^{8}
(Austria) Jurij Rodionov	5	7^{7}	6^{6}
15	(Germany) Mats Moraing	6	6
9	(India) Ramkumar Ramanathan	4	1
6	(Slovakia) Lukáš Lacko	7	6
13	(Croatia) Viktor Galović	5	3
10	(Belarus) Egor Gerasimov	6	6
(France) Kenny de Schepper	4	3

Semifinals
(Italy) Roberto Marcora	4	7	7^{9}
15	(Germany) Mats Moraing	6	5	6^{7}
6	(Slovakia) Lukáš Lacko	3	6	3
10	(Belarus) Egor Gerasimov	6	1	6

Final
(Italy) Roberto Marcora	2	5
10	(Belarus) Egor Gerasimov	6	7

=== Top half ===
==== Section 1 ====
First round
WC	(Italy) G Fonio	1	2
(China) Zh Zhang	6	6
(Ecuador) R Quiroz	1	6	5
(Italy) R Marcora	6	4	7
ITF	(Russia) E Tiurnev	3	3
(Austria) J Rodionov	6	6
(Portugal) G Oliveira	3	4
ITF	(Italy) R Brancaccio	6	6

Second round
1/WC	(Germany) M Bachinger	6	6
(China) Zh Zhang	1	4
(Italy) R Marcora	6	6
14	(Bosnia and Herzegovina) M Bašić	3	4
11	(Italy) S Napolitano	4	3
(Austria) J Rodionov	6	6
ITF	(Italy) R Brancaccio	4	6	6
7	(Spain) A Menéndez Maceiras	6	3	3

Third round
1/WC	(Germany) M Bachinger	7^{7}	3	4
(Italy) R Marcora	6^{5}	6	6
(Austria) J Rodionov	3	7^{7}	6
ITF	(Italy) R Brancaccio	6	6^{4}	1

Quarterfinals
(Italy) R Marcora	7	6^{5}	7^{8}
(Austria) J Rodionov	5	7^{7}	6^{6}

==== Section 2 ====
First round
(Italy) A Bega	2	7	6
WC	(Italy) E Dalla Valle	6	5	2
Q	(Italy) Samuele Ramazzotti	7	7^{7}
(Norway) V Durasovic	5	6^{3}
ITF	(France) A Rinderknech	4	3
Q	(Serbia) N Čačić	6	6
(Italy) M Viola	6	7^{7}
WC	(Italy) Emiliano Maggioli	3	6^{4}

Second round
3	(Italy) L Giustino	6^{4}	2
(Italy) A Bega	7^{7}	6
Q	(Italy) S Ramazzotti	4	4
15	(Germany) M Moraing	6	6
9	(India) R Ramanathan	6	6
Q	(Serbia) N Čačić	3	3
(Italy) M Viola	6	5	6
5	(Belarus) I Ivashka	4	7	4

Third round
(Italy) A Bega	3	2
15	(Germany) M Moraing	6	6
9	(India) R Ramanathan	6	6
(Italy) M Viola	4	1

Quarterfinals
15	(Germany) M Moraing	6	6
9	(India) R Ramanathan	4	1

=== Bottom half ===
==== Section 3 ====
First round
(Italy) L Vanni	6^{4}	4
(Russia) A Avidzba	7^{7}	6
ITF	(Russia) A Karatsev	2	5
(Brazil) T Seyboth Wild	6	7
(Russia) P Kotov	6	1	6
(Peru) JP Varillas	4	6	4
(Ukraine) I Marchenko	2	7^{7}	6
(Japan) K Uchida	6	6^{5}	4

Second round
6	(Slovakia) L Lacko	6	6
(Russia) A Avidzba	2	4
(Brazil) T Seyboth Wild	4	4^{r}
12	(Ecuador) E Gómez	6	3
13	(Croatia) V Galović	7^{7}	6
(Russia) P Kotov	6^{4}	4
(Ukraine) I Marchenko	6^{4}	6	5
4	(Ukraine) S Stakhovsky	7^{7}	3	7

Third round
6	(Slovakia) L Lacko	7^{8}	4	6
12	(Ecuador) E Gómez	6^{6}	6	3
13	(Croatia) V Galović	5	6	6
4	(Ukraine) S Stakhovsky	7	3	3

Quarterfinals
6	(Slovakia) L Lacko	7	6
13	(Croatia) V Galović	5	3

==== Section 4 ====
First round
(Italy) A Vavassori	6	7
Alt	(Italy) M Bortolotti	4	5
(France) G Sakharov	3	6^{5}
(Switzerland) M-A Hüsler	6	7^{7}
(Japan) Yo Watanuki	6	6
WC	(Italy) L Musetti	0	2
(Bosnia and Herzegovina) A Šetkić	5	3
(France) K de Schepper	7	6

Second round
8	(Italy) F Baldi	3	7^{8}	2
(Italy) A Vavassori	6	6^{6}	6
(Switzerland) M-A Hüsler	5	6^{5}
10	(Belarus) E Gerasimov	7	7^{7}
16	(Spain) E López Pérez	2	4
(Japan) Yo Watanuki	6	6
(France) K de Schepper	6	6
2	(Russia) E Donskoy	3	4

Third round
(Italy) A Vavassori	1	6	3
10	(Belarus) E Gerasimov	6	3	6
(Japan) Yo Watanuki	0	2
(France) K de Schepper	6	6

Quarterfinals
10	(Belarus) E Gerasimov	6	6
(France) K de Schepper	4	3
