= 2013 Guzzini Challenger – Singles =

Singles
- 2013 Guzzini Challenger

Final
- Champion: (Italy) Thomas Fabbiano
- Runner-up: (France) David Guez
- Score: 6–0, 6–3

Events
Singles	Doubles
← 2012 ·	Guzzini Challenger	· 2014 →

Simone Bolelli was the defending champion, but chose not to compete.
Italian Thomas Fabbiano won the title over David Guez 6–0, 6–3

== Seeds ==
1. (Japan) Go Soeda (second round)
2. (Romania) Marius Copil (second round)
3. (Italy) Flavio Cipolla (quarterfinals)
4. (France) Josselin Ouanna (quarterfinals)
5. (France) David Guez (final)
6. (Argentina) Facundo Bagnis (first round)
7. (Chile) Jorge Aguilar (first round)
8. (Argentina) Renzo Olivo (first round)

== Draw ==
=== Key ===
- Q = Qualifier
- WC = Wild card
- LL = Lucky loser
- Alt = Alternate
- SE = Special exempt
- PR = Protected ranking
- ITF = ITF entry
- JE = Junior exempt
- w/o = Walkover
- r = Retired
- d = Defaulted
- SR = Special ranking

=== Finals ===
Semifinals
(Italy) Thomas Fabbiano	3	7^{7}	7
(France) Albano Olivetti	6	6^{5}	5
5	(France) David Guez	6	7
(Spain) Adrián Menéndez Maceiras	3	5

Final
(Italy) Thomas Fabbiano	6	6
5	(France) David Guez	0	3

=== Top half ===
First round
1	(Japan) G Soeda	6	6
(Italy) A Giannessi	3	2
(Spain) J Checa Calvo	2	0
(Italy) T Fabbiano	6	6
(Croatia) N Mektić	3	2
WC	(Italy) S Caruso	6	6
(Netherlands) M Middelkoop	7^{7}	6
7	(Chile) J Aguilar	6^{5}	3
3/WC	(Italy) F Cipolla	7^{7}	6
(Czech Republic) Michal Konečný	6^{4}	2
PR	(Italy) S Travaglia	2	7^{8}	4
WC	(Italy) G Quinzi	6	6^{6}	6
(Australia) D Propoggia	7	6
Q	(Italy) A Virgili	5	2
(France) A Olivetti	6	7^{8}
8	(Argentina) R Olivo	3	6^{6}

Second round
1	(Japan) G Soeda	3	1
(Italy) T Fabbiano	6	6
WC	(Italy) S Caruso	6^{4}	6	6
(Netherlands) M Middelkoop	7^{7}	3	4
3/WC	(Italy) F Cipolla	6	4	6
WC	(Italy) G Quinzi	4	6	4
(Australia) D Propoggia	6^{3}	3
(France) A Olivetti	7^{7}	6

Quarterfinals
(Italy) T Fabbiano	4	7^{7}	7
WC	(Italy) S Caruso	6	6^{5}	5
3/WC	(Italy) F Cipolla	7^{7}	3	6^{6}
(France) A Olivetti	6	6	7^{8}

Semifinals
(Italy) T Fabbiano	3	7^{7}	7
(France) A Olivetti	6	6^{5}	5

=== Bottom half ===
First round
5	(France) D Guez	7	6
(France) F Martin	5	3
(Italy) A Arnaboldi	7^{7}	6
(Spain) G Granollers	6^{3}	2
(France) P-H Herbert	6	7^{7}
Q	(Italy) A Bega	4	6^{1}
(Japan) T Daniel	4	2
4	(France) J Ouanna	6	6
6/WC	(Argentina) F Bagnis	3	6^{4}
(Spain) A Menéndez Maceiras	6	7^{7}
Q	(Italy) L Vanni	6^{8}	1
(France) G Burquier	7^{10}	6
(Switzerland) M Lammer	3	7	6
(Russia) A Karatsev	6	5	4
(Bosnia and Herzegovina) A Šetkić	6	6^{5}	2
2	(Romania) M Copil	3	7^{7}	6

Second round
5	(France) D Guez	6	6
(Italy) A Arnaboldi	4	1
(France) P-H Herbert	6^{5}	7^{7}	1
4	(France) J Ouanna	7	6^{1}	6
(Spain) A Menéndez Maceiras	6	5	6
(France) G Burquier	2	7	4
(Switzerland) M Lammer	5	6	6
2	(Romania) M Copil	7	4	4

Quarterfinals
5	(France) D Guez	6	6
4	(France) J Ouanna	3	4
(Spain) A Menéndez Maceiras	6	6
(Switzerland) M Lammer	1	3

Semifinals
5	(France) D Guez	6	7
(Spain) A Menéndez Maceiras	3	5
