= 2009 Guzzini Challenger – Doubles =

Doubles
- 2009 Guzzini Challenger

Final
- Champions: (Denmark) Frederik Nielsen (Australia) Joseph Sirianni
- Runners-up: (Italy) Adriano Biasella (Kazakhstan) Andrey Golubev
- Score: 6–4, 3–6, [10–6]

Events
Singles	Doubles
← 2008 ·	Guzzini Challenger	· 2010 →

Benedikt Dorsch and Björn Phau were the defending champions, but chose to not participate this year.
Frederik Nielsen and Joseph Sirianni won in the final 6–4, 3–6, [10–6], against Adriano Biasella and Andrey Golubev.

== Seeds ==
1. (Switzerland) George Bastl / (Ukraine) Sergiy Stakhovsky (quarterfinals)
2. (Brazil) Rogério Dutra da Silva / (Brazil) Franco Ferreiro (quarterfinals)
3. (Denmark) Frederik Nielsen / (Australia) Joseph Sirianni (champions)
4. (Italy) Thomas Fabbiano / (Italy) Gianluca Naso (first round)

== Draw ==
=== Key ===
- Q = Qualifier
- WC = Wild card
- LL = Lucky loser
- Alt = Alternate
- SE = Special exempt
- PR = Protected ranking
- ITF = ITF entry
- JE = Junior exempt
- w/o = Walkover
- r = Retired
- d = Defaulted
- SR = Special ranking

=== Draw ===
First round
1	(Switzerland) G Bastl (Ukraine) S Stakhovsky	6^{4}	2
(Australia) S Kadir (India) P Raja	7	6
(Italy) E Iannuzzi (France) J-N Insausti	3	3
(Italy) R Ghedin (United Kingdom) J Marray	6	6
3	(Denmark) F Nielsen (Australia) J Sirianni	6	6
(Spain) R Bautista-Agut (Spain) P Martín-Adalia	4	3
WC	(Greece) N Karagiannis (Slovenia) G Žemlja	6^{2}	7	[14]
(Croatia) N Mektić (Italy) F Torresi	7	6^{6}	[16]
(Argentina) F del Bonis (Argentina) N Pastor	6^{5}	6	[4]
(Italy) S Galvani (Bosnia and Herzegovina) I Gorčić	7	3	[10]
(Italy) D Bracciali (Italy) U Vico	6	6
4	(Italy) T Fabbiano (Italy) G Naso	3	2
WC	(Italy) G Miccini (Italy) M Trevisan	w/o
(Italy) A Biasella (Kazakhstan) A Golubev
WC	(Italy) G Portaluri (Italy) L Zoppi	6^{7}	4
2	(Brazil) R Dutra da Silva (Brazil) F Ferreiro	7	6

Quarterfinals
1	(Switzerland) G Bastl (Ukraine) S Stakhovsky	3	6	[5]
(Italy) R Ghedin (United Kingdom) J Marray	6	3	[10]
3	(Denmark) F Nielsen (Australia) J Sirianni	6	6
(Croatia) N Mektić (Italy) F Torresi	4	2
(Italy) S Galvani (Bosnia and Herzegovina) I Gorčić	2	4
(Italy) D Bracciali (Italy) U Vico	6	6
(Italy) A Biasella (Kazakhstan) A Golubev	6	6
2	(Brazil) R Dutra da Silva (Brazil) F Ferreiro	4	3

Semifinals
(Italy) R Ghedin (United Kingdom) J Marray	6^{1}	1
3	(Denmark) F Nielsen (Australia) J Sirianni	7	6
(Italy) D Bracciali (Italy) U Vico	4	6	[6]
(Italy) A Biasella (Kazakhstan) A Golubev	6	3	[10]

Finals
3	(Denmark) F Nielsen (Australia) J Sirianni	6	3	[10]
(Italy) A Biasella (Kazakhstan) A Golubev	4	6	[6]
