= 2011 Guzzini Challenger – Singles =

Singles
- 2011 Guzzini Challenger

Final
- Champion: (France) Fabrice Martin
- Runner-up: (France) Kenny de Schepper
- Score: 6–1, 6–7^{(6–8)}, 7–6^{(7–3)}

Events
Singles	Doubles
← 2010 ·	Guzzini Challenger	· 2012 →

Stéphane Bohli was the defending champion, but decided not to participate.

Unseeded Fabrice Martin won the title, beating 4th seed Kenny de Schepper 6–1, 6–7^{(6–8)}, 7–6^{(7–3)} in the final.

== Seeds ==
1. (Germany) Rainer Schüttler (second round)
2. (Slovenia) Grega Žemlja (semifinals)
3. (Italy) Paolo Lorenzi (first round)
4. (France) Kenny de Schepper (final)
5. (Belgium) Ruben Bemelmans (first round)
6. (France) Arnaud Clément (first round)
7. (Romania) Adrian Ungur (second round)
8. (Netherlands) Igor Sijsling (second round)

== Draw ==
=== Key ===
- Q = Qualifier
- WC = Wild card
- LL = Lucky loser
- Alt = Alternate
- SE = Special exempt
- PR = Protected ranking
- ITF = ITF entry
- JE = Junior exempt
- w/o = Walkover
- r = Retired
- d = Defaulted
- SR = Special ranking

=== Finals ===
Semifinals
(Italy) Stefano Galvani	5	3
4	(France) Kenny de Schepper	7	6
Q	(France) Fabrice Martin	6	6^{2}	6
2	(Slovenia) Grega Žemlja	4	7^{7}	4

Final
4	(France) Kenny de Schepper	1	7^{8}	6^{3}
Q	(France) Fabrice Martin	6	6^{6}	7^{7}

=== Top half ===
First round
1	(Germany) R Schüttler	6	6
(Croatia) N Mektić	3	3
(Ukraine) A Smirnov	2	0
(Italy) S Galvani	6	6
(Slovakia) M Mečíř Jr.	4	4
(France) Charles-Antoine Brézac	6	6
(Denmark) F Nielsen	6	7^{7}
5	(Belgium) R Bemelmans	3	6^{4}
4	(France) K de Schepper	7	4
Q	(Netherlands) M Middelkoop	5	2^{r}
(Spain) G Granollers	6	6
Q	(Italy) Andrea Agazzi	2	1
(Czech Republic) J Minář	6	6
(Australia) J Lemke	4	4
Q	(Italy) F Cipolla	7	6
6	(France) A Clément	5	1

Second round
1	(Germany) R Schüttler	6^{2}	4
(Italy) S Galvani	7^{7}	6
(France) Charles-Antoine Brézac	6	5	1
(Denmark) F Nielsen	4	7	6
4	(France) K de Schepper	7	6
(Spain) G Granollers	5	1
(Czech Republic) J Minář	0	1
Q	(Italy) F Cipolla	6	6

Quarterfinals
(Italy) S Galvani	6	6
(Denmark) F Nielsen	2	3
4	(France) K de Schepper	6	3	6
Q	(Italy) F Cipolla	3	6	4

Semifinals
(Italy) S Galvani	5	3
4	(France) K de Schepper	7	6

=== Bottom half ===
First round
8	(Netherlands) I Sijsling	6	6
(Moldova) R Albot	4	2
(Argentina) F Delbonis	3	4
Q	(France) F Martin	6	6
WC	(Italy) Giacomo Miccini	6	3	6
(Australia) B Klein	4	6	3
WC	(Italy) Federico Gaio	5	6	6
3/WC	(Italy) P Lorenzi	7	4	4
7	(Romania) A Ungur	3	6	6
(Italy) R Ghedin	6	4	2
(Spain) R Bautista Agut	6	7^{7}
(France) L Walter	1	6^{5}
(France) Grégoire Burquier	7	6
(United Kingdom) D Cox	5	0
WC	(Italy) Federico Torresi	3	2
2	(Slovenia) G Žemlja	6	6

Second round
8	(Netherlands) I Sijsling	6	6^{6}	4
Q	(France) F Martin	4	7^{8}	6
WC	(Italy) Giacomo Miccini	3	3
WC	(Italy) Federico Gaio	6	6
7	(Romania) A Ungur	4	7^{7}	4
(Spain) R Bautista Agut	6	6^{4}	6
(France) Grégoire Burquier	2	3
2	(Slovenia) G Žemlja	6	6

Quarterfinals
Q	(France) F Martin	6	7^{7}
WC	(Italy) Federico Gaio	3	6^{4}
(Spain) R Bautista Agut	6^{4}	6^{4}
2	(Slovenia) G Žemlja	7^{7}	7^{7}

Semifinals
Q	(France) F Martin	6	6^{2}	6
2	(Slovenia) G Žemlja	4	7^{7}	4
