= 2010 Guzzini Challenger – Doubles =

Doubles
- 2010 Guzzini Challenger

Final
- Champions: (United Kingdom) Jamie Delgado (Croatia) Lovro Zovko
- Runners-up: (France) Charles-Antoine Brézac (France) Vincent Stouff
- Score: 7–6(6), 6–1

Events
Singles	Doubles
← 2009 ·	Guzzini Challenger	· 2011 →

Frederik Nielsen and Joseph Sirianni were the defenders of championship title.
Jamie Delgado and Lovro Zovko became the new champions, after their won 7–6(6), 6–1, against Charles-Antoine Brézac and Vincent Stouff.

== Seeds ==
1. (United Kingdom) Jamie Delgado / (Croatia) Lovro Zovko (champions)
2. (Germany) Martin Emmrich / (Sweden) Andreas Siljeström (semifinals)
3. (France) Olivier Charroin / (France) Alexandre Renard (quarterfinals)
4. (Portugal) João Sousa / (Portugal) Leonardo Tavares (quarterfinals)

== Draw ==
=== Key ===
- Q = Qualifier
- WC = Wild card
- LL = Lucky loser
- Alt = Alternate
- SE = Special exempt
- PR = Protected ranking
- ITF = ITF entry
- JE = Junior exempt
- w/o = Walkover
- r = Retired
- d = Defaulted
- SR = Special ranking

=== Draw ===
First round
1	(United Kingdom) J Delgado (Croatia) L Zovko	6	6
(Croatia) R Karanušić (Montenegro) G Tošić	1	3
(Lithuania) L Grigelis (Italy) A Stoppini	6^{5}	6	[11]
(Italy) S Galvani (Italy) R Ghedin	7	3	[9]
4	(Portugal) J Sousa (Portugal) L Tavares	6	7
WC	(Italy) M Dell'acqua (Italy) G Miccini	3	6^{5}
(Romania) M Copil (Slovakia) I Klec	6^{5}	5
(United States) A Kumar (India) P Raja	7	7
(Belgium) R Bemelmans (Belgium) Y Mertens	4	6	[6]
(France) C-A Brézac (France) V Stouff	6	2	[10]
(Spain) S Gutiérrez-Ferrol (Netherlands) B Westerhof	6	2	[7]
3	(France) O Charroin (France) A Renard	1	6	[10]
(Italy) A Giannessi (Italy) D Giorgini	3	4
WC	(Switzerland) G Bastl (Italy) F Torresi	6	6
WC	(Italy) T Costagna (Italy) L Zoppi	1	0
2	(Germany) M Emmrich (Sweden) A Siljeström	6	6

Quarterfinals
1	(United Kingdom) J Delgado (Croatia) L Zovko	6	6
(Lithuania) L Grigelis (Italy) A Stoppini	4	1
4	(Portugal) J Sousa (Portugal) L Tavares	6	5	[7]
(United States) A Kumar (India) P Raja	4	7	[10]
(France) C-A Brézac (France) V Stouff	6	6
3	(France) O Charroin (France) A Renard	2	4
WC	(Switzerland) G Bastl (Italy) F Torresi	2	4
2	(Germany) M Emmrich (Sweden) A Siljeström	6	6

Semifinals
1	(United Kingdom) J Delgado (Croatia) L Zovko	6	6
(United States) A Kumar (India) P Raja	4	4
(France) C-A Brézac (France) V Stouff	6	7
2	(Germany) M Emmrich (Sweden) A Siljeström	3	6^{5}

Finals
1	(United Kingdom) J Delgado (Croatia) L Zovko	7	6
(France) C-A Brézac (France) V Stouff	6^{6}	1
