= 2011 Guzzini Challenger =

- Date: 25–31 July
- Edition: 9th
- Surface: Hard
- Location: Recanati, Italy

Champions

Singles
- (France) Fabrice Martin

Doubles
- (Denmark) Frederik Nielsen / (United Kingdom) Ken Skupski
← 2010 ·	Guzzini Challenger	· 2012 →

The 2011 Guzzini Challenger was a professional tennis tournament played on hard courts. It was the ninth edition of the tournament which was part of the 2011 ATP Challenger Tour. It took place in Recanati, Italy between 25 and 31 July 2011.

== ATP entrants ==
=== Seeds ===
Country	Player	Rank^{1}	Seed
GER	Rainer Schüttler	111	1
SVN	Grega Žemlja	137	2
ITA	Paolo Lorenzi	141	3
FRA	Kenny de Schepper	145	4
BEL	Ruben Bemelmans	146	5
FRA	Arnaud Clément	150	6
ROU	Adrian Ungur	158	7
NED	Igor Sijsling	177	8

- ^{1} Rankings are as of July 18, 2011.

=== Other entrants ===
The following players received wildcards into the singles main draw:

- (Italy) Federico Gaio
- (Italy) Paolo Lorenzi
- (Italy) Giacomo Miccini
- (Italy) Federico Torresi

The following players received entry from the qualifying draw:

- (Italy) Andrea Agazzi
- (Italy) Flavio Cipolla
- (France) Fabrice Martin
- (Netherlands) Matwé Middelkoop

== Champions ==
=== Singles ===
(France) Fabrice Martin def. (France) Kenny de Schepper, 6–1, 6–7^{(6–8)}, 7–6^{(7–3)}

=== Doubles ===
(Denmark) Frederik Nielsen / (United Kingdom) Ken Skupski def. (Italy) Federico Gaio / (India) Purav Raja, 6–4, 7–5
