= 2019 Guzzini Challenger =

- Date: 1–7 July
- Edition: 17th
- Surface: Hard
- Location: Recanati, Italy

Champions

Singles
- (Belarus) Egor Gerasimov

Doubles
- (Portugal) Gonçalo Oliveira / (India) Ramkumar Ramanathan
- Guzzini Challenger

The 2019 Guzzini Challenger was a professional tennis tournament played on hard courts. It was the seventeenth edition of the tournament which was part of the 2019 ATP Challenger Tour. It took place in Recanati, Italy between 1 and 7 July 2019.

== Singles main-draw entrants ==
=== Seeds ===
| Country | Player | Rank^{1} | Seed |
|---|---|---|---|
| GER | Matthias Bachinger | 121 | 1 |
| RUS | Evgeny Donskoy | 129 | 2 |
| ITA | Lorenzo Giustino | 134 | 3 |
| UKR | Sergiy Stakhovsky | 139 | 4 |
| BLR | Ilya Ivashka | 140 | 5 |
| SVK | Lukáš Lacko | 144 | 6 |
| ESP | Adrián Menéndez Maceiras | 148 | 7 |
| ITA | Filippo Baldi | 151 | 8 |
| IND | Ramkumar Ramanathan | 154 | 9 |
| BLR | Egor Gerasimov | 170 | 10 |
| ITA | Stefano Napolitano | 179 | 11 |
| ECU | Emilio Gómez | 185 | 12 |
| CRO | Viktor Galović | 199 | 13 |
| BIH | Mirza Bašić | 203 | 14 |
| GER | Mats Moraing | 208 | 15 |
| ESP | Enrique López Pérez | 211 | 16 |

- ^{1} Rankings are as of 24 June 2019.

=== Other entrants ===
The following players received wildcards into the singles main draw:

- (Germany) Matthias Bachinger
- (Italy) Enrico Dalla Valle
- (Italy) Giovanni Fonio
- (Italy) Emiliano Maggioli
- (Italy) Lorenzo Musetti

The following player received entry into the singles main draw as an alternate:

- (Italy) Marco Bortolotti

The following players received entry into the singles main draw using their ITF World Tennis Ranking:

- (Italy) Raúl Brancaccio
- (Russia) Aslan Karatsev
- (Belgium) ~~Yannick Mertens~~
- (France) Arthur Rinderknech
- (Russia) Evgenii Tiurnev

The following players received entry from the qualifying draw:

- (Serbia) Nikola Ćaćić
- (Italy) Samuele Ramazzotti

== Champions ==
=== Singles ===
- (Belarus) Egor Gerasimov def. (Italy) Roberto Marcora 6–2, 7–5.

=== Doubles ===
- (Portugal) Gonçalo Oliveira / (India) Ramkumar Ramanathan def. (Italy) Andrea Vavassori / (Spain) David Vega Hernández 6–2, 6–4.
