= 2013 Guzzini Challenger – Doubles =

Doubles
- 2013 Guzzini Challenger

Final
- Champions: (United Kingdom) Ken Skupski (United Kingdom) Neal Skupski
- Runners-up: (Italy) Gianluigi Quinzi (Italy) Adelchi Virgili
- Score: 6–4, 6–2

Events
Singles	Doubles
← 2012 ·	Guzzini Challenger	· 2014 →

Brydan Klein and Dane Propoggia were the defending champions but Klein decided not to participate, Propoggia chose to play with Stefano Ianni and lost in the semifinals to Gianluigi Quinzi and Adelchi Virgili. Quinzi and Virgili lost in the final to Ken Skupski and Neal Skupski 6–4, 6–2.

== Seeds ==
1. (Italy) Stefano Ianni / (Australia) Dane Propoggia (semifinals)
2. (United States) Vahid Mirzadeh / (United States) Denis Zivkovic (semifinals)
3. (Italy) Alessandro Motti / (Italy) Matteo Volante (first round)
4. (United Kingdom) Ken Skupski / (United Kingdom) Neal Skupski (champion)

== Draw ==
=== Key ===
- Q = Qualifier
- WC = Wild card
- LL = Lucky loser
- Alt = Alternate
- SE = Special exempt
- PR = Protected ranking
- ITF = ITF entry
- JE = Junior exempt
- w/o = Walkover
- r = Retired
- d = Defaulted
- SR = Special ranking

=== Draw ===
First round
1	(Italy) S Ianni (Australia) D Propoggia	6	6
(Romania) M Copil (United Kingdom) J Delgado	2	4
(Uruguay) A Behar (Argentina) G Durán	7^{7}	6
(Croatia) N Mektić (Bosnia and Herzegovina) A Šetkić	6^{0}	1
3	(Italy) A Motti (Italy) Matteo Volante	6^{5}	6^{4}
WC	(Italy) G Quinzi (Italy) A Virgili	7^{7}	7^{7}
(Australia) R Agar (Austria) S Bader	6	3	[2]
WC	(Italy) Matteo Civarolo (Italy) Edoardo Eremin	4	6	[10]
(Italy) S Caruso (Italy) S Travaglia	1	2
(France) Julien Maes (France) F Martin	6	6
(France) P-H Herbert (France) A Olivetti	5	7^{7}	[10]
4	(United Kingdom) K Skupski (United Kingdom) N Skupski	7	6^{4}	'[12]
WC	(Italy) D Sanguinetti (Japan) G Soeda	6	6
(United States) Erik Elliott (Italy) F Gaio	3	2
(Spain) J Checa-Calvo (Algeria) L Ouahab	1	1
2	(United States) V Mirzadeh (United States) D Zivkovic	6	6

Quarterfinals
1	(Italy) S Ianni (Australia) D Propoggia	6	6
(Uruguay) A Behar (Argentina) G Durán	0	1
WC	(Italy) G Quinzi (Italy) A Virgili	6	6
WC	(Italy) M Civarolo (Italy) E Eremin	4	4
(France) J Maes (France) F Martin	3	2
4	(United Kingdom) K Skupski (United Kingdom) N Skupski	6	6
(Italy) D Sanguinetti (Japan) G Soeda	6	3	[3]
2	(United States) V Mirzadeh (United States) D Zivkovic	4	6	[10]

Semifinals
1	(Italy) S Ianni (Australia) D Propoggia	3	6	[8]
WC	(Italy) G Quinzi (Italy) A Virgili	6	3	[10]
4	(United Kingdom) K Skupski (United Kingdom) N Skupski	6	6
2	(United States) V Mirzadeh (United States) D Zivkovic	3	4

Final
WC	(Italy) G Quinzi (Italy) A Virgili	4	2
4	(United Kingdom) K Skupski (United Kingdom) N Skupski	6	6
