= 2017 Guzzini Challenger – Singles =

Singles
- 2017 Guzzini Challenger

Final
- Champion: (Croatia) Viktor Galović
- Runner-up: (Bosnia and Herzegovina) Mirza Bašić
- Score: 7–6^{(7–3)}, 6–4

Events
| Singles | Doubles |
| ← 2016 · | Guzzini Challenger | · 2018 → |

Illya Marchenko was the defending champion but chose not to defend his title.

Viktor Galović won the title after defeating Mirza Bašić 7–6^{(7–3)}, 6–4 in the final.

== Seeds ==
1. (Italy) Luca Vanni (semifinals)
2. (France) Quentin Halys (quarterfinals)
3. (Spain) Adrián Menéndez Maceiras (quarterfinals)
4. (France) Kenny de Schepper (second round)
5. (Bosnia and Herzegovina) Mirza Bašić (final)
6. (Belarus) Egor Gerasimov (second round)
7. (Italy) Salvatore Caruso (semifinals)
8. (Bosnia and Herzegovina) Aldin Šetkić (first round)

== Draw ==
=== Key ===
- Q = Qualifier
- WC = Wild card
- LL = Lucky loser
- Alt = Alternate
- ITF = ITF entry
- PR = Protected ranking
- SR = Special ranking
- SE = Special exempt
- JE = Junior exempt
- JR = Junior Accelerator Programme entrant
- CO = College Accelerator Programme entrant
- NG = Next Gen Accelerator Program entrant
- w/o = Walkover
- r = Retired
- d = Defaulted

=== Finals ===
Semifinals
1 | (Italy) Luca Vanni | 7^{7} | 6^{4} | 6^{2}
5 | (Bosnia and Herzegovina) Mirza Bašić | 6^{3} | 7^{7} | 7^{7}
7 | (Italy) Salvatore Caruso | 3 | 3
Q | (Croatia) Viktor Galović | 6 | 6

Final
5 | (Bosnia and Herzegovina) Mirza Bašić | 6^{3} | 4
Q | (Croatia) Viktor Galović | 7^{7} | 6

=== Top half ===
First round
1 | (Italy) L Vanni | 3 | 6 | 6
(Egypt) M Safwat | 6 | 3 | 4
Q | (Denmark) F Nielsen | 4 | 7^{7} | 6
(Argentina) A Velotti | 6 | 6^{3} | 3
(Serbia) D Petrović | 1 | 6^{2}
(Germany) M Moraing | 6 | 7^{7}
WC | (Italy) G Mager | 6^{3} | 4
6 | (Belarus) E Gerasimov | 7^{7} | 6
3 | (Spain) A Menéndez Maceiras | 6 | 7^{7}
Q | (Russia) E Karlovskiy | 2 | 6^{4}
(Italy) A Bega | 7 | 6
(Israel) E Leshem | 5 | 2
(France) M Hamou | 6 | 6^{3} | 7^{8}
(Serbia) P Krstin | 2 | 7^{7} | 6^{6}
WC | (Italy) J Ocleppo | 6 | 3 | 1
5 | (Bosnia and Herzegovina) M Bašić | 3 | 6 | 6

Second round
1 | (Italy) L Vanni | 6 | 2 | 6
Q | (Denmark) F Nielsen | 2 | 6 | 2
(Germany) M Moraing | 3 | 7^{7} | 7^{9}
6 | (Belarus) E Gerasimov | 6 | 6^{3} | 6^{7}
3 | (Spain) A Menéndez Maceiras | 5 | 7 | 6
(Italy) A Bega | 7 | 5 | 4
(France) M Hamou | 4 | 2
5 | (Bosnia and Herzegovina) M Bašić | 6 | 6

Quarterfinals
1 | (Italy) L Vanni | 7^{7} | 6
(Germany) M Moraing | 6^{3} | 3
3 | (Spain) A Menéndez Maceiras | 6 | 3 | 3
5 | (Bosnia and Herzegovina) M Bašić | 3 | 6 | 6

Semifinals
1 | (Italy) L Vanni | 7^{7} | 6^{4} | 6^{2}
5 | (Bosnia and Herzegovina) M Bašić | 6^{3} | 7^{7} | 7^{7}

=== Bottom half ===
First round
7 | (Italy) S Caruso | 7^{7} | 6
(Czech Republic) Petr Michnev | 6^{5} | 2
(Russia) A Kudryavtsev | 6 | 2 | 3
(India) R Ramanathan | 4 | 6 | 6
(Italy) A Arnaboldi | 7^{7} | 6
(Turkey) M İlhan | 6^{4} | 2
(France) J Eysseric | 3 | 6 | 1
4 | (France) K de Schepper | 6 | 3 | 6
8 | (Bosnia and Herzegovina) A Šetkić | 3 | 6^{1}
WC | (Italy) A Vavassori | 6 | 7^{7}
WC | (Italy) Edoardo Eremin | 7^{9} | 3 | 2
Q | (Croatia) V Galović | 6^{7} | 6 | 6
(Belgium) Y Mertens | 3 | 6 | 7^{7}
(Kazakhstan) D Popko | 6 | 3 | 6^{0}
Q | (Turkey) A Çelikbilek | 1 | 6^{2}
2 | (France) Q Halys | 6 | 7^{7}

Second round
7 | (Italy) S Caruso | 6^{5} | 6 | 7
(India) R Ramanathan | 7^{7} | 3 | 5
(Italy) A Arnaboldi | 7^{7} | 6
4 | (France) K de Schepper | 6^{5} | 4
WC | (Italy) A Vavassori | 1 | 3
Q | (Croatia) V Galović | 6 | 6
(Belgium) Y Mertens | 1 | 4
2 | (France) Q Halys | 6 | 6

Quarterfinals
7 | (Italy) S Caruso | 6 | 6
(Italy) A Arnaboldi | 3 | 1
Q | (Croatia) V Galović | 6^{5} | 7 | 6
2 | (France) Q Halys | 7^{7} | 5 | 4

Semifinals
7 | (Italy) S Caruso | 3 | 3
Q | (Croatia) V Galović | 6 | 6
