= 2012 Guzzini Challenger – Doubles =

Doubles
- 2012 Guzzini Challenger

Final
- Champions: (Australia) Brydan Klein (Australia) Dane Propoggia
- Runners-up: (Croatia) Marin Draganja (Croatia) Dino Marcan
- Score: 7–5, 2–6, [14–12]

Events
Singles	Doubles
← 2011 ·	Guzzini Challenger	· 2013 →

Frederik Nielsen and Ken Skupski were the defending champions but decided not to participate.
Brydan Klein and Dane Propoggia won the final 7–5, 2–6, [14–12] against Marin Draganja and Dino Marcan.

== Seeds ==
1. (Croatia) Marin Draganja / (Croatia) Dino Marcan (final)
2. (Italy) Claudio Grassi / (Italy) Stefano Ianni (semifinals)
3. (Italy) Alessandro Motti / (United States) Denis Zivkovic (quarterfinals)
4. (Australia) Brydan Klein / (Australia) Dane Propoggia (champions)

== Draw ==
=== Key ===
- Q = Qualifier
- WC = Wild card
- LL = Lucky loser
- Alt = Alternate
- SE = Special exempt
- PR = Protected ranking
- ITF = ITF entry
- JE = Junior exempt
- w/o = Walkover
- r = Retired
- d = Defaulted
- SR = Special ranking

=== Draw ===
First round
(Italy) Lorenzo Giustino (France) Julien Obry	6	6
WC	(Romania) Paul Rareș Andriuc (Romania) Angel Ștefan Rașcu	1	2
(Australia) J Lemke (Australia) Chris Letcher	6	2	[11]
(Canada) P Polansky (Italy) Federico Torresi	2	6	[9]
(Republic of Ireland) James Cluskey (France) F Martin	6	7
(Italy) Marco Cecchinato (Italy) S Galvani	3	5
(Italy) Marco Stancati (Italy) L Vanni	6	3	[13]
(Italy) Matteo Marfia (Italy) Giacomo Miccini	3	6	[11]

Quarterfinals
1	(Croatia) M Draganja (Croatia) D Marcan	7	6
(Italy) Lorenzo Giustino (France) Julien Obry	5	2
3	(Italy) A Motti (United States) D Zivkovic	4	7^{7}	[12]
(Australia) J Lemke (Australia) Chris Letcher	6	6^{0}	[14]
(Republic of Ireland) James Cluskey (France) F Martin	7^{7}	4	[7]
4	(Australia) B Klein (Australia) D Propoggia	6^{3}	6	[10]
(Italy) Marco Stancati (Italy) L Vanni	4	2
2	(Italy) Claudio Grassi (Italy) S Ianni	6	6

Semifinals
1	(Croatia) M Draganja (Croatia) D Marcan	6	6
(Australia) J Lemke (Australia) Chris Letcher	3	3
4	(Australia) B Klein (Australia) D Propoggia	6^{3}	6	[11]
2	(Italy) Claudio Grassi (Italy) S Ianni	7^{7}	1	[9]

Final
1	(Croatia) M Draganja (Croatia) D Marcan	5	6	[12]
4	(Australia) B Klein (Australia) D Propoggia	7	2	[14]
