= 2009 Guzzini Challenger – Singles =

Singles
- 2009 Guzzini Challenger

Final
- Champion: (Switzerland) Stéphane Bohli
- Runner-up: (Kazakhstan) Andrey Golubev
- Score: 6–4, 7–6(4)

Events
Singles	Doubles
← 2008 ·	Guzzini Challenger	· 2010 →

The 2009 Guzzini Challenger was a professional tennis tournament played on Hard courts. This was the sixth edition of the tournament which is part of the 2009 ATP Challenger Tour. It took place in Recanati, Italy between 20 July and 26 July 2009. In the singles competition, Horacio Zeballos chose to not defend his 2008 title. Stéphane Bohli defeated Andrey Golubev in the final 6–4, 7–6(4).

== Seeds ==
1. (Kazakhstan) Andrey Golubev (final)
2. (Ukraine) Sergiy Stakhovsky (quarterfinals)
3. (Slovakia) Karol Beck (second round)
4. (Brazil) Thomaz Bellucci (first round)
5. (Italy) Paolo Lorenzi (quarterfinals)
6. (Italy) Tomas Tenconi (first round)
7. (Switzerland) Stéphane Bohli (champion)
8. (Slovakia) Lukáš Lacko (semifinals)

== Draw ==
=== Key ===
- Q = Qualifier
- WC = Wild card
- LL = Lucky loser
- Alt = Alternate
- SE = Special exempt
- PR = Protected ranking
- ITF = ITF entry
- JE = Junior exempt
- w/o = Walkover
- r = Retired
- d = Defaulted
- SR = Special ranking

=== Final four ===
Semifinals
1	(Kazakhstan) Andrey Golubev	6	6
WC	(Italy) Daniele Bracciali	3	2
8	(Slovakia) Lukáš Lacko	6^{5}	6^{6}
7	(Switzerland) Stéphane Bohli	7	7

Final
1	(Kazakhstan) Andrey Golubev	4	6^{4}
7	(Switzerland) Stéphane Bohli	6	7

=== Top half ===
First round
1	(Kazakhstan) A Golubev	6	6
(Switzerland) M Lammer	3	4
(Belgium) R Bemelmans	7	6
(Italy) G Petrazzuolo	6^{5}	4
LL	(Switzerland) G Bastl	4	4
(Turkey) M İlhan	6	6
Q	(Morocco) R Chaki	3	1
5	(Italy) P Lorenzi	6	6
3	(Slovakia) K Beck	7	6
WC	(Italy) F Torresi	6^{8}	4
WC	(Italy) D Bracciali	3	6	6
Q	(France) J-N Insausti	6	3	4
LL	(Argentina) F Delbonis	7	4	6
Q	(Italy) G Naso	6^{3}	6	3
(Denmark) F Nielsen	6	6
6	(Italy) T Tenconi	4	3

Second round
1	(Kazakhstan) A Golubev	7	6
(Belgium) R Bemelmans	5	3
(Turkey) M İlhan	4	6	4
5	(Italy) P Lorenzi	6	3	6
3	(Slovakia) K Beck	6	1	5
WC	(Italy) D Bracciali	3	6	7
LL	(Argentina) F Delbonis	6	0	4
(Denmark) F Nielsen	2	6	6

Quarterfinals
1	(Kazakhstan) A Golubev	6	6
5	(Italy) P Lorenzi	4	0
WC	(Italy) D Bracciali	6	6
(Denmark) F Nielsen	4	4

Semifinals
1	(Kazakhstan) A Golubev	6	6
WC	(Italy) D Bracciali	3	2

=== Bottom half ===
First round
8	(Slovakia) L Lacko	6	6
(Slovenia) G Žemlja	4	3
(Germany) M Bachinger	5	6	7
Q	(Republic of Ireland) L Sorensen	7	3	5
SE	(Netherlands) I Sijsling	6^{5}	6	7
(Brazil) F Ferreiro	7	3	6^{7}
(Austria) M Fischer	7	6^{4}	6
4/SE	(Brazil) T Bellucci	6^{5}	7	2
7	(Switzerland) S Bohli	4	7	6
(Spain) R Bautista Agut	6	6^{4}	4
WC	(Italy) G Miccini	3	2
(Brazil) R Dutra da Silva	6	6
(Italy) R Ghedin	6	6
(Australia) J Sirianni	4	3
(Italy) S Galvani	6	1	4
2	(Ukraine) S Stakhovsky	4	6	6

Second round
8	(Slovakia) L Lacko	6	6^{4}	6
(Germany) M Bachinger	1	7	1
SE	(Netherlands) I Sijsling	6	3	3
(Austria) M Fischer	4	6	6
7	(Switzerland) S Bohli	6	6
(Brazil) R Dutra da Silva	3	1
(Italy) R Ghedin	6	4	3
2	(Ukraine) S Stakhovsky	4	6	6

Quarterfinals
8	(Slovakia) L Lacko	6	7
(Austria) M Fischer	4	6^{9}
7	(Switzerland) S Bohli	6	7
2	(Ukraine) S Stakhovsky	2	6^{9}

Semifinals
8	(Slovakia) L Lacko	6^{5}	6^{6}
7	(Switzerland) S Bohli	7	7
