= Bo Hodge =

American tennis player (born 1981)

- Full name: James Boukedes Hodge
- Country (sports): United States
- Born: December 13, 1981 (age 44) Athens, Georgia, U.S.
- Height: 6 ft 4 in (193 cm)
- Prize money: $31,130

Singles
- Highest ranking: No. 497 (August 12, 2002)

Grand Slam singles results
- US Open: Q1 (2002)

Doubles
- Career record: 0–2
- Highest ranking: No. 439 (November 26, 2001)

Grand Slam doubles results
- US Open: 1R (2003)

James Boukedes "Bo" Hodge (born December 13, 1981) is an American former professional tennis player.

Hodge, a native of Athens, Georgia, won a high school state title at Athens Academy and later studied at Boca Prep in Florida, where he had Andy Roddick and Mardy Fish as teammates.

A four-time All-American for the University of Georgia, Hodge was a member of the 2001 NCAA championship winning team and was an NCAA doubles finalist with John Isner in 2004. He was ranked as high as two in the national collegiate rankings. His father Mark had played tight end for the University of Georgia's football team during the 1970s.

On the professional tour, Hodge attained a best singles world ranking of 497 and won one ITF Futures title. He competed in the doubles main draw of the 2003 US Open as a wildcard pairing with Mardy Fish, who he later coached on tour.

Hodge served as associate head coach for the University of Georgia men's team from 2015 to 2017, until being suspended while he was under police investigation for possessing Adderall without a prescription. It was revealed that he had been borrowing pills off Georgia players and also once bought some off the son of head coach Manny Diaz. He received three years of probation on the possession charge and lost his coaching job.

== ITF Futures titles ==
=== Singles: (1) ===
No.	Date	Tournament	Surface	Opponent	Score
1.	Jun 2002	Jamaica F7, Montego Bay	Hard	(United States) Andrew Colombo	6–4, 6–3

=== Doubles: (4) ===
No.	Date	Tournament	Surface	Partner	Opponents	Score
1.	Jul 2001	USA F17A, Quogue	Clay	(United States) Michael Sell	(United States) Evan Austin (United States) Andrew Colombo	6–4, 6–4
2.	Jul 2001	USA F17B, Pittsburgh	Clay	(United States) Andrew Colombo	(Italy) Adriano Biasella (United States) Scott Lipsky	6–1, 6–7^{(6)}, 6–4
3.	Sep 2001	Mexico F6, Guadalajara	Clay	(Argentina) Matías Boeker	(India) Vikrant Chadha (United States) Eric Nunez	6–2, 6–3
4.	Sep 2001	Mexico F7, Puerto Vallarta	Hard	(Argentina) Matías Boeker	(Ecuador) Luis Fernando Manrique (United States) Kiantki Thomas	6–4, 7–6^{(3)}
