= 2013 Guzzini Challenger =

- Date: 15–21 July
- Edition: 11th
- Surface: Hard
- Location: Recanati, Italy

Champions

Singles
- (Italy) Thomas Fabbiano

Doubles
- (United Kingdom) Ken Skupski / (United Kingdom) Neal Skupski
← 2012 ·	Guzzini Challenger	· 2014 →

The 2013 Guzzini Challenger was a professional tennis tournament played on hard courts. It was the eleventh edition of the tournament which was part of the 2013 ATP Challenger Tour. It took place in Recanati, Italy between 15 and 21 July 2013.

== Singles main-draw entrants ==
=== Seeds ===
Country	Player	Rank^{1}	Seed
JPN	Go Soeda	124	1
ROU	Marius Copil	132	2
ITA	Flavio Cipolla	147	3
FRA	Josselin Ouanna	161	4
FRA	David Guez	170	5
ARG	Facundo Bagnis	186	6
CHI	Jorge Aguilar	190	7
ARG	Renzo Olivo	206	8

- ^{1} Rankings are as of July 9, 2013.

=== Other entrants ===
The following players received wildcards into the singles main draw:

- (Argentina) Facundo Bagnis
- (Italy) Salvatore Caruso
- (Italy) Flavio Cipolla
- (Italy) Gianluigi Quinzi

The following players got into the singles main draw via protected ranking:

- (Italy) Stefano Travaglia

The following players received entry from the qualifying draw:

- (Italy) Alessandro Bega
- (Russia) Aslan Karatsev
- (Italy) Luca Vanni
- (Italy) Adelchi Virgili

== Champions ==
=== Singles ===
- (Italy) Thomas Fabbiano def. (France) David Guez 6–0, 6–3

=== Doubles ===
- (United Kingdom) Ken Skupski / (United Kingdom) Neal Skupski def. (Italy) Gianluigi Quinzi / (Italy) Adelchi Virgili 6–4, 6–3
