= 2018 Guzzini Challenger =

- Date: 2–8 July
- Edition: 16th
- Surface: Hard
- Location: Recanati, Italy

Champions

Singles
- (Germany) Daniel Brands

Doubles
- (China) Gong Maoxin / (China) Zhang Ze
- Guzzini Challenger

The 2018 Guzzini Challenger was a professional tennis tournament played on hard courts. It was the sixteenth edition of the tournament which was part of the 2018 ATP Challenger Tour. It took place in Recanati, Italy between 2 and 8 July 2018.

== Singles main-draw entrants ==
=== Seeds ===
| Country | Player | Rank^{1} | Seed |
|---|---|---|---|
| IND | Ramkumar Ramanathan | 125 | 1 |
| BLR | Ilya Ivashka | 126 | 2 |
| FRA | Quentin Halys | 133 | 3 |
| KAZ | Alexander Bublik | 141 | 4 |
| ESP | Adrián Menéndez Maceiras | 146 | 5 |
| CRO | Viktor Galović | 183 | 6 |
| ITA | Salvatore Caruso | 195 | 7 |
| JPN | Hiroki Moriya | 214 | 8 |

- ^{1} Rankings are as of 25 June 2018.

=== Other entrants ===
The following players received wildcards into the singles main draw:

- (Italy) Raúl Brancaccio
- (Italy) Enrico Dalla Valle
- (Italy) Giacomo Miccini
- (Italy) Andrea Vavassori

The following player received entry into the singles main draw using a protected ranking:

- (Germany) Daniel Brands

The following players received entry from the qualifying draw:

- (Spain) Andrés Artuñedo
- (Chile) Marcelo Tomás Barrios Vera
- (Italy) Andrea Basso
- (Bosnia and Herzegovina) Aldin Šetkić

== Champions ==
=== Singles ===
- (Germany) Daniel Brands def. (Spain) Adrián Menéndez Maceiras 7–5, 6–3.

=== Doubles ===
- (China) Gong Maoxin / (China) Zhang Ze def. (Ecuador) Gonzalo Escobar / (Brazil) Fernando Romboli 2–6, 7–6^{(7–5)}, [10–8].
