= Andrew Colombo =

American tennis player

- Country (sports): United States
- Born: July 11, 1980 (age 44); Rochester, New York
- Height: 6 ft 5 in (196 cm)
- Plays: Right-handed

Singles
- Highest ranking: No. 751 (March 31, 2003)

Doubles
- Highest ranking: No. 574 (July 28, 2003)

Andrew Colombo (born July 11, 1980) is an American former professional tennis player.

A native of Rochester, New York, Colombo had a game built around his powerful serve. He received a full athletic scholarship to Auburn University and in 2002 partnered with Mark Kovacs to win the NCAA Division I doubles championship. The unseeded pairing had only been Auburn's No. 2 doubles team that season and held a national ranking of 27th. He finished his collegiate career at Arizona State University, after which he competed on the professional tour. During his time on tour he won two ITF Futures doubles titles.

== ITF Futures titles ==
=== Doubles: (2) ===
No.	Date	Tournament	Surface	Partner	Opponents	Score
1.	Jul 2001	USA F17B, Pittsburgh	Clay	(United States) Bo Hodge	(Italy) Adriano Biasella (United States) Scott Lipsky	6–1, 6–7^{(6)}, 6–4
2.	Jul 2002	USA F18, Pittsburgh	Clay	(Egypt) Tamer El-Sawy	(South Africa) Justin Bower (United States) Jeff Laski	7–6^{(2)}, 3–6, 7–6^{(1)}
