= 2018 Guzzini Challenger – Doubles =

Doubles
- 2018 Guzzini Challenger

Final
- Champions: (China) Gong Maoxin (China) Zhang Ze
- Runners-up: (Ecuador) Gonzalo Escobar (Brazil) Fernando Romboli
- Score: 2–6, 7–6^{(7–5)}, [10–8]

Events
Singles	Doubles
- Guzzini Challenger

Jonathan Eysseric and Quentin Halys were the defending champions but only Halys chose to defend his title, partnering Albano Olivetti. Halys lost in the semifinals to Gong Maoxin and Zhang Ze.

Gong and Zhang won the title after defeating Gonzalo Escobar and Fernando Romboli 2–6, 7–6^{(7–5)}, [10–8] in the final.

== Seeds ==
1. (Ecuador) Roberto Quiroz / (Australia) Matt Reid (first round)
2. (China) Gong Maoxin / (China) Zhang Ze (champions)
3. (Italy) Alessandro Motti / (Ukraine) Volodymyr Uzhylovskyi (first round)
4. (Philippines) Ruben Gonzales / (United States) Nathaniel Lammons (first round)

== Draw ==
Key

- Q = Qualifier
- WC = Wild card
- LL = Lucky loser
- Alt = Alternate
- ITF = ITF entry
- PR = Protected ranking
- SR = Special ranking
- SE = Special exempt
- JE = Junior exempt
- JR = Junior Accelerator Programme entrant
- CO = College Accelerator Programme entrant
- NG = Next Gen Accelerator Program entrant
- w/o = Walkover
- r = Retired
- d = Defaulted

First round
1	(Ecuador) R Quiroz (Australia) M Reid	6	6^{4}	[6]
WC	(Italy) R Brancaccio (Italy) E Dalla Valle	2	7^{7}	[10]
WC	(Italy) A Bega (Italy) Giacomo Miccini	1	6	[7]
WC	(Italy) S Caruso (Italy) W Trusendi	6	2	[10]
4	(Philippines) R Gonzales (United States) N Lammons	6	3	[7]
(Ecuador) G Escobar (Brazil) F Romboli	1	6	[10]
(Japan) H Moriya (India) R Ramanathan	5	5
(Spain) S Martos Gornés (Spain) A Menéndez Maceiras	7	7
(Italy) J Ocleppo (Italy) A Vavassori	6	6
(Kazakhstan) A Bublik (Russia) A Pavlioutchenkov	3	4
(France) Q Halys (France) A Olivetti	7	6
3	(Italy) A Motti (Ukraine) V Uzhylovskyi	5	2
(Serbia) N Čačić (Croatia) M Sabanov	4	4
(Dominican Republic) R Cid Subervi (Colombia) DE Galán	6	6
(Spain) P Martínez (Spain) B Zapata Miralles	6	3	[3]
2	(China) M Gong (China) Ze Zhang	3	6	[10]

Quarterfinals
WC	(Italy) R Brancaccio (Italy) E Dalla Valle	3	4
WC	(Italy) S Caruso (Italy) W Trusendi	6	6
(Ecuador) G Escobar (Brazil) F Romboli	6	4	[10]
(Spain) S Martos Gornés (Spain) A Menéndez Maceiras	3	6	[7]
(Italy) J Ocleppo (Italy) A Vavassori	3	4
(France) Q Halys (France) A Olivetti	6	6
(Dominican Republic) R Cid Subervi (Colombia) DE Galán	4	6^{4}
2	(China) M Gong (China) Ze Zhang	6	7^{7}

Semifinals
WC	(Italy) S Caruso (Italy) W Trusendi	6	4	[5]
(Ecuador) G Escobar (Brazil) F Romboli	4	6	[10]
(France) Q Halys (France) A Olivetti	7^{7}	1	[6]
2	(China) M Gong (China) Ze Zhang	6^{5}	6	[10]

Final
(Ecuador) G Escobar (Brazil) F Romboli	6	6^{5}	[8]
2	(China) M Gong (China) Ze Zhang	2	7^{7}	[10]
