= 2015 Guzzini Challenger =

- Date: 20–26 July
- Edition: 13th
- Surface: Hard
- Location: Recanati, Italy

Champions

Singles
- (Bosnia and Herzegovina) Mirza Bašić

Doubles
- (India) Divij Sharan / (United Kingdom) Ken Skupski
← 2014 ·	Guzzini Challenger	· 2016 →

The 2015 Guzzini Challenger was a professional tennis tournament played on hard courts. It was the thirteenth edition of the tournament which was part of the 2015 ATP Challenger Tour. It took place in Recanati, Italy between 20 and 26 July 2015.

== Singles main-draw entrants ==
=== Seeds ===
Country	Player	Rank^{1}	Seed
LTU	Ričardas Berankis	83	1
BEL	Ruben Bemelmans	95	2
POL	Michał Przysiężny	140	3
RUS	Alexander Kudryavtsev	146	4
GER	Peter Gojowczyk	157	5
JPN	Hiroki Moriya	164	6
BEL	Niels Desein	170	7
HUN	Márton Fucsovics	185	8

- ^{1} Rankings are as of July 13, 2015.

=== Other entrants ===
The following players received wildcards into the singles main draw:

- (Italy) Matteo Berrettini
- (Italy) Edoardo Eremin
- (Italy) Giacomo Miccini
- (Italy) Stefano Napolitano

The following player received entry into the singles main draw as a special exempt:

- (Italy) Salvatore Caruso

The following player received entry the singles main draw as an alternate:

- (France) Quentin Halys

The following players received entry from the qualifying draw:

- (France) Sébastien Boltz
- (Serbia) Ilija Bozoljac
- (Italy) Flavio Cipolla
- (United States) Jesse Witten

The following player received entry as a lucky loser:

- (China) Wang Chuhan

=== Singles ===
- (Bosnia and Herzegovina) Mirza Bašić def. (Lithuania) Ričardas Berankis 6–4, 3–6, 7–6^{(7–4)}

=== Doubles ===
- (India) Divij Sharan / (United Kingdom) Ken Skupski def. (Serbia) Ilija Bozoljac / (Italy) Flavio Cipolla 4–6, 7–6^{(7–3)}, [10–6]
