= 2012 Guzzini Challenger =

- Date: 16–22 July
- Edition: 10th
- Surface: Hard
- Location: Recanati, Italy

Champions

Singles
- (Italy) Simone Bolelli

Doubles
- (Australia) Brydan Klein / (Australia) Dane Propoggia
← 2011 ·	Guzzini Challenger	· 2013 →

The 2012 Guzzini Challenger was a professional tennis tournament played on hard courts. It was the tenth edition of the tournament which was part of the 2012 ATP Challenger Tour. It took place in Recanati, Italy between 16 and 22 July 2012.

== Singles main-draw entrants ==
=== Seeds ===
Country	Player	Rank^{1}	Seed
TUN	Malek Jaziri	70	1
SVK	Karol Beck	117	2
FRA	Florent Serra	119	3
ITA	Simone Bolelli	128	4
CAN	Peter Polansky	157	5
ESP	Adrián Menéndez	189	6
FRA	Kenny de Schepper	208	7
ITA	Gianluca Naso	223	8

- ^{1} Rankings are as of July 9, 2012.

=== Other entrants ===
The following players received wildcards into the singles main draw:

- (Italy) Marco Cecchinato
- (Kazakhstan) Evgeny Korolev
- (Italy) Giacomo Miccini
- (Italy) Federico Torresi

The following players received entry from the qualifying draw:

- (United Kingdom) Daniel Cox
- (Croatia) Marin Draganja
- (Australia) Chris Letcher
- (Australia) Dane Propoggia

== Champions ==
=== Singles ===
- (Italy) Simone Bolelli def. (France) Fabrice Martin, 6–3, 6–2

=== Doubles ===
- (Australia) Brydan Klein / (Australia) Dane Propoggia def. (Croatia) Marin Draganja / (Croatia) Dino Marcan, 7–5, 2–6, [14–12]
