= 2014 Guzzini Challenger =

- Date: 14–20 July
- Edition: 12th
- Surface: Hard
- Location: Recanati, Italy

Champions

Singles
- (Luxembourg) Gilles Müller

Doubles
- (Serbia) Ilija Bozoljac / (Serbia) Goran Tošić
| ← 2013 · | Guzzini Challenger | · 2015 → |

The 2014 Guzzini Challenger was a professional tennis tournament played on hard courts. It was the twelfth edition of the tournament which was part of the 2014 ATP Challenger Tour. It took place in Recanati, Italy between 14 and 20 July 2014.

== Singles main-draw entrants ==
=== Seeds ===
| Country | Player | Rank^{1} | Seed |
|---|---|---|---|
| LUX | Gilles Müller | 84 | 1 |
| LTU | Ričardas Berankis | 141 | 2 |
| SVK | Andrej Martin | 166 | 3 |
| HUN | Márton Fucsovics | 167 | 4 |
| ESP | Adrián Menéndez Maceiras | 175 | 5 |
| FRA | David Guez | 182 | 6 |
| RUS | Konstantin Kravchuk | 193 | 7 |
| SRB | Ilija Bozoljac | 197 | 8 |

- ^{1} Rankings are as of July 7, 2014.

=== Other entrants ===
The following players received wildcards into the singles main draw:

- (Italy) Salvatore Caruso
- (Italy) Antonio Massara
- (Italy) Giacomo Miccini
- (Italy) Stefano Napolitano

The following player received a special exemption into the singles main draw:

- (United Kingdom) Kyle Edmund

The following player got into the singles main draw via protected ranking:

- (Ukraine) Sergei Bubka

The following players received entry from the qualifying draw:

- (Russia) Victor Baluda
- (Peru) Duilio Beretta
- (Argentina) Guillermo Durán
- (Croatia) Filip Veger

== Doubles main-draw entrants ==
=== Seeds ===
| Country | Player | Country | Player | Rank^{1} | Seed |
|---|---|---|---|---|---|
| ARG | Guillermo Durán | ARG | Máximo González | 223 | 1 |
| URU | Ariel Behar | ITA | Alessandro Motti | 305 | 2 |
| GBR | Jamie Delgado | LUX | Gilles Müller | 356 | 3 |
| RUS | Victor Baluda | PER | Sergio Galdós | 383 | 4 |

- ^{1} Rankings as of July 7, 2014.

=== Other entrants ===
The following pairs received wildcards into the doubles main draw:

- (Italy) Salvatore Caruso / (Italy) Stefano Napolitano
- (Italy) Edoardo Castagna / (Italy) Paride Mangiaterra
- (Italy) Lorenzo Frigerio / (Italy) Matteo Trevisan

The following pair got into the singles main draw via protected ranking:

- (Lithuania) Ričardas Berankis / (Ukraine) Sergei Bubka

== Champions ==
=== Singles ===
- (Luxembourg) Gilles Müller def. (Serbia) Ilija Bozoljac 6–1, 6–2

=== Doubles ===
- (Serbia) Ilija Bozoljac / (Serbia) Goran Tošić def. (Republic of Ireland) James Cluskey / (Lithuania) Laurynas Grigelis 5–7, 6–4, [10–5]
