= Adriano Biasella =

Italian tennis player

- Country (sports): Italy
- Born: 1 September 1980 (age 44)
- Plays: Right-Handed
- Prize money: $41,862

Singles
- Career record: 0–0
- Career titles: 0
- Highest ranking: No. 389 (19 November 2007)

Doubles
- Career record: 0–0
- Career titles: 0
- Highest ranking: No. 342 (23 July 2007)
- Last updated on: 12 March 2018.

Adriano Biasella (born 1 September 1980) is a retired Italian tennis player.

Biasella has a career high ATP singles ranking of 389 achieved on 19 November 2007. He also has a career high doubles ranking of 342 achieved on 23 July 2007.

He won his only ATP Challenger Tour title at the 2006 AON Open Challenger doubles competition in Genoa.

== ATP Challenger and ITF Futures finals ==
=== Singles: 7 (1–6) ===
ATP Challenger (0–0)
ITF Futures (1–6)

Result	W–L	Date	Tournament	Tier	Surface	Opponent	Score
Loss	0–1	Mar 2006	Chetumal, Mexico	Futures	Hard	(Uruguay) Marcel Felder	3–6, 3–6
Win	1–1	Mar 2007	Gatineau, Canada	Futures	Hard (i)	(Canada) Frédéric Niemeyer	3–6, 7–6^{(9–7)}, 6–4
Loss	1–2	May 2007	Orange Park, United States	Futures	Clay	(Italy) Stefano Ianni	3–6, 6–1, 4–6
Loss	1–3	Jun 2007	Sofia, Bulgaria	Futures	Clay	(Monaco) Jean-René Lisnard	5–7, 7–6^{(8–6)}, 4–6
Loss	1–4	Aug 2007	Valencia, Venezuela	Futures	Hard	(Mexico) Santiago González	4–6, 3–6
Loss	1–5	Sep 2008	Claremont, United States	Futures	Hard	(Armenia) Tigran Martirosyan	3–6, 4–6
Loss	1–6	Feb 2009	Naucalpan, Mexico	Futures	Hard	(Mexico) Víctor Romero	7–6^{(7–2)}, 2–6, 1–6

=== Doubles: 9 (4–5) ===
ATP Challenger (1–2)
ITF Futures (3–3)

Result	W–L	Date	Tournament	Tier	Surface	Partner	Opponents	Score
Loss	0–1	Jul 2001	Pittsburgh, United States	Futures	Clay	(United States) Scott Lipsky	(United States) Andrew Colombo (United States) Bo Hodge	1–6, 7–6^{(8–6)}, 4–6
Win	1–1	Sep 2005	Sassari, Italy	Futures	Hard	(Russia) Andrey Golubev	(Uzbekistan) Farrukh Dustov (Italy) Manuel Gasbarri	7–6^{(8–6)}, 6–1
Win	2–1	Oct 2005	Arzachena, Italy	Futures	Hard	(Italy) Alessandro Accardo	(Austria) Andreas Fasching (Austria) Konstantin Gruber	6–3, 6–3
Win	1–0	Sep 2006	Genoa, Italy	Challenger	Clay	(Argentina) Marcelo Charpentier	(United Kingdom) Jamie Delgado (United Kingdom) Jamie Murray	6–4, 4–6, [13–11]
Win	3–1	May 2007	Orange Park, United States	Futures	Clay	(Italy) Stefano Ianni	(Australia) Colin Ebelthite (Australia) Clinton Thomson	4–6, 6–3, 7–6^{(7–5)}
Loss	3–2	Jul 2007	Toulon, France	Futures	Clay	(Uruguay) Marcel Felder	(France) Augustin Gensse (Spain) David Marrero	6–2, 3–6, 6–7^{(5–7)}
Loss	1–1	Jul 2007	Montauban, France	Challenger	Clay	(Monaco) Jean-René Lisnard	(Spain) Marc Fornell Mestres (Spain) Gabriel Trujillo Soler	3–6, 5–7
Loss	3–3	Feb 2009	Tuxtla Gutiérrez, Mexico	Futures	Hard	(Austria) Nikolaus Moser	(Italy) Claudio Grassi (United States) Matthew Roberts	4–6, 5–7
Loss	1–2	Jul 2009	Recanati, Italy	Challenger	Clay	(Kazakhstan) Andrey Golubev	(Denmark) Frederik Nielsen (Australia) Joseph Sirianni	4–6, 6–3, [6–10]
