= 2010 Guzzini Challenger =

- Date: July 19 – July 25
- Edition: 7th
- Surface: Hard
- Location: Recanati, Italy

Champions

Singles
- (Switzerland) Stéphane Bohli

Doubles
- (United Kingdom) Jamie Delgado / (Croatia) Lovro Zovko
- Guzzini Challenger

The 2010 Guzzini Challenger was a professional tennis tournament played on hard courts. This was the seventh edition of the tournament which is part of the 2010 ATP Challenger Tour. It took place in Recanati, Italy between 19 July and 25 July 2010.

== ATP entrants ==
=== Seeds ===
Nationality	Player	Ranking*	Seeding
FRA	David Guez	117	1
SUI	Stéphane Bohli	130	2
CZE	Jan Hernych	136	3
FRA	Josselin Ouanna	145	4
NED	Igor Sijsling	149	5
BEL	Niels Desein	164	6
BEL	Ruben Bemelmans	194	7
ESP	Guillermo Alcaide	212	8

- Rankings are as of July 12, 2010.

=== Other entrants ===
The following players received wildcards into the singles main draw:

- (Italy) Alessandro Giannessi
- (Italy) Giacomo Miccini
- (Italy) Andrea Stoppini
- (Italy) Federico Torresi

The following players received entry from the qualifying draw:

- (Switzerland) George Bastl
- (France) Olivier Charroin
- (Lithuania) Laurynas Grigelis
- (Italy) Francesco Piccari (as a Lucky Loser)
- (France) Alexandre Renard

== Champions ==
=== Singles ===
(Switzerland) Stéphane Bohli def. (France) Adrian Mannarino, 6–0, 3–6, 7–6(5)

=== Doubles ===
(United Kingdom) Jamie Delgado / (Croatia) Lovro Zovko def. (France) Charles-Antoine Brézac / (France) Vincent Stouff, 7–6(6), 6–1
