= Viktor Galović =

Croatian tennis player

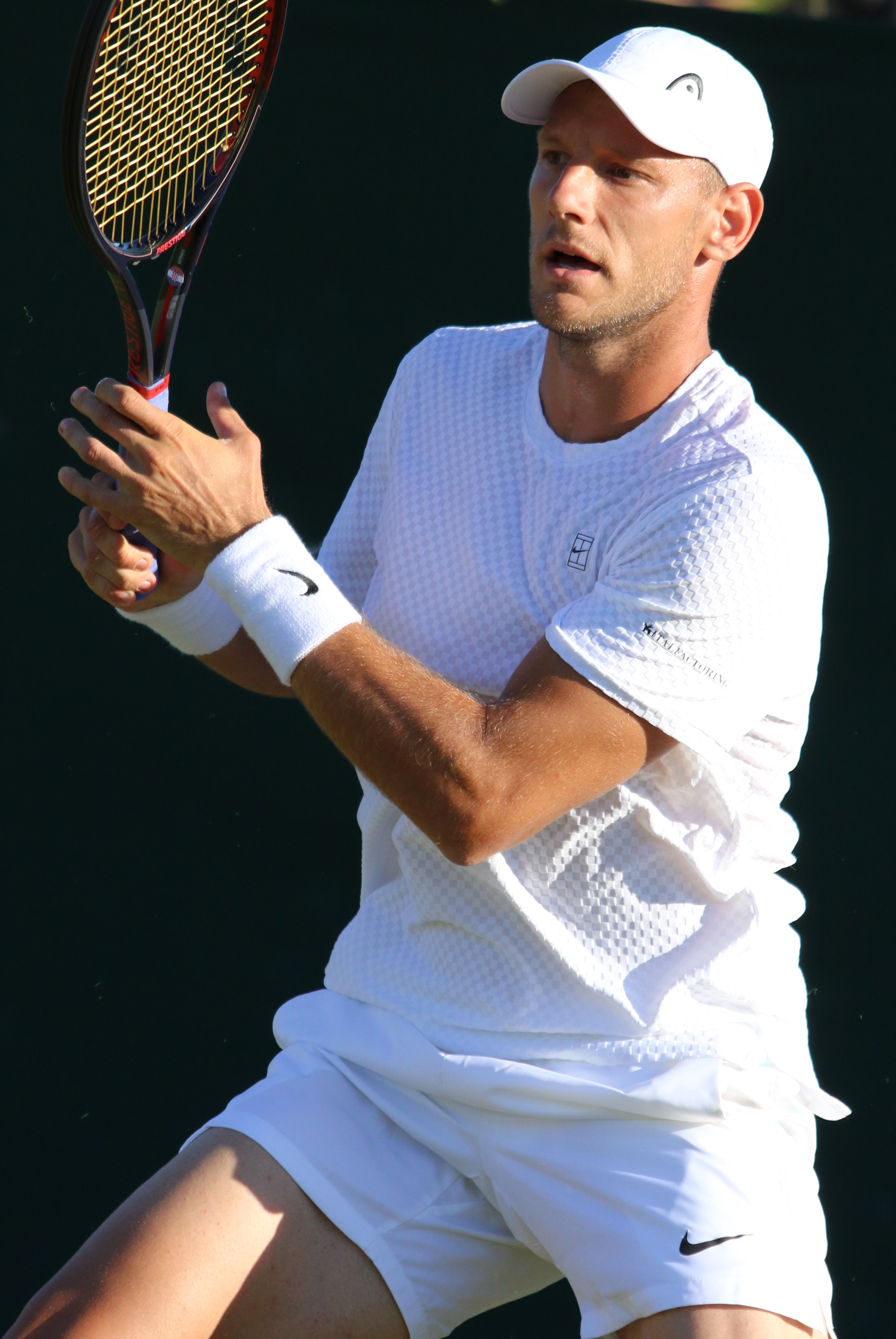
- Galović at the 2018 Wimbledon Championships
- Full name: Viktor Galović
- Country (sports): Italy (2008–2014); Croatia (2014–present)
- Residence: Verona, Italy
- Born: 19 September 1990 (age 35) Nova Gradiška, SR Croatia, SFR Yugoslavia
- Height: 1.92 m (6 ft 4 in)
- Turned pro: 2011
- Retired: 2021
- Plays: Right-handed (two–handed backhand)
- Coach: Daniel Panajotti
- Prize money: $384,965

Singles
- Career record: 3–6 (at ATP Tour level, Grand Slam level, and in Davis Cup)
- Career titles: 0
- Highest ranking: No. 173 (14 May 2018)

Grand Slam singles results
- Australian Open: Q2 (2018, 2020)
- French Open: Q2 (2018)
- Wimbledon: Q3 (2019)
- US Open: Q2 (2019)

Doubles
- Career record: 0–0
- Career titles: 0
- Highest ranking: No. 490 (19 March 2018)
- Last updated on: 10 June 2021.

Viktor Galović (Croatian pronunciation: [ʋîktor ɡâːloʋitɕ]; born 19 September 1990) is a Croatian former tennis player. Galović has a career high ATP singles ranking of 173, achieved on 14 May 2018. Galović had previously represented Italy where he was raised but in 2014 switched back to his home country of Croatia.

== Career ==
Galović made his ATP main draw singles debut at the 2014 Bet-at-home Cup Kitzbühel where he qualified for the main draw, defeating Philipp Davydenko, Lukáš Dlouhý and Antonio Veić en route. In the main draw he lost to Albert Ramos Viñolas in three sets in the first round.

Galović had his grass debut in Stuttgart where he lost in the second round of qualifications to Denis Kudla. But he was lucky and he received an entry as a lucky loser. In the first round of the ATP tournament in Stuttgart he lost to Maximilian Marterer 6:3,4:6,1:6.

Galović retired in July 2021 due to continuous back and hip injuries.

== Davis Cup ==
Galović had three team nominations for Croatia in the Davis Cup, playing two matches. His debut was on 17 September 2017 in Bogotá, Colombia in the 2017 Davis Cup World Group play-offs. He defeated Alejandro González in a best of three sets, dead rubber (6–4, 2–6, 6–2).

His second match was played in Osijek, Croatia in the First Round of 2018 Davis Cup World Group against Canada. He played against Denis Shapovalov on 2 February 2018 and lost 4–6, 4–6, 2–6.

Galović was on the list of the Croatian players in the quarter-final of 2018 Davis Cup against Kazakhstan but was unused by captain Željko Krajan.

=== Statistics ===
Year	Nom's	Ties	Match	Sets	S %	Games	G %
2017	1	1	1–0	2–1	66.67%	14–12	53.85%
2018	2	1	0–1	0–3	0%	10–18	35.71%
Total	3	2	1–1	2–4	33%	24–30	44%

Source: www.daviscup.com

== Performance timeline ==
Key
W	F	SF	QF	#R	RR	Q#	DNQ	A	NH

(W) winner; (F) finalist; (SF) semifinalist; (QF) quarterfinalist; (#R) rounds 4, 3, 2, 1; (RR) round-robin stage; (Q#) qualification round; (DNQ) did not qualify; (A) absent; (NH) not held; (SR) strike rate (events won / competed); (W–L) win–loss record.
To avoid confusion and double counting, these charts are updated at the conclusion of a tournament or when the player's participation has ended.

=== Singles ===
Tournament	2017	2018	2019	2020	2021	SR	W–L	Win %
Grand Slam tournaments
Australian Open	A	Q2	Q1	Q2	A	0 / 0	0–0	–
French Open	A	Q2	Q1	A	A	0 / 0	0–0	–
Wimbledon	A	Q2	Q3	NH	A	0 / 0	0–0	–
US Open	Q1	Q1	Q2	A	A	0 / 0	0–0	–
Win–loss	0–0	0–0	0–0	0–0	0–0	0 / 0	0–0	–

== ATP Challenger and ITF Futures finals ==
=== Singles: 11 (4–7) ===
Legend ATP Challenger (1–1) ITF Futures (3–6)	Finals by surface Hard (1–2) Clay (2–5) Grass (0–0) Carpet (1–0)

Result	W–L	Date	Tournament	Tier	Surface	Opponent	Score
Loss	0-1	Mar 2012	Ukraine F3, Cherkassy	Futures	Hard	(Ukraine) Oleksandr Nedovyesov	2-6, 3-6
Win	1-1	Jul 2012	Italy F18, Modena	Futures	Clay	(Italy) Enrico Fioravante	4–6, 6–4, 7–6^{(7–4)}
Win	2-1	Nov 2012	Greece F5, Heraklion	Futures	Carpet	(Germany) Robin Kern	2–6, 7–6^{(7–4)}, 7-5
Win	3-1	Apr 2014	Italy F8, Santa Margherita Di Pula	Futures	Clay	(Italy) Alberto Brizzi	7–6^{(7–5)}, 4–6, 6-3
Loss	3-2	Apr 2015	Italy F6, Santa Margherita Di Pula	Futures	Clay	(Norway) Viktor Durasovic	3-6, 2-6
Loss	3-3	Jun 2015	Italy F14, Naples	Futures	Clay	(Italy) Daniele Giorgini	2-6, 3-6
Loss	3-4	Mar 2017	Italy F3, Basiglio	Futures	Hard	(Italy) Alessandro Bega	6–3, 3–6, 4–6
Loss	3-5	May 2017	Italy F14, Frascati	Futures	Clay	(Ecuador) Gonzalo Escobar	1-6, 2-6
Loss	3-6	Jun 2017	Italy F17, Bergamo	Futures	Clay	(Argentina) Andrea Collarini	2-6, 4-6
Win	4-6	Jul 2017	Recanati, Italy	Challenger	Hard	(Bosnia and Herzegovina) Mirza Bašić	7–6^{(7–3)}, 6-4
Loss	4-7	Jul 2017	Braunschweig, Germany	Challenger	Clay	(Spain) Nicola Kuhn	6–2, 5–7, 2–4 ret.

=== Doubles: 8 (4–4) ===
Legend ATP Challenger (0–0) ITF Futures (4–4)	Finals by surface Hard (1–0) Clay (3–3) Grass (0–0) Carpet (0–1)

Result	W–L	Date	Tournament	Tier	Surface	Partner	Opponents	Score
Win	1-0	Oct 2011	Turkey F29, Antalya	Futures	Hard	(Romania) Andrei Mlendea	(Italy) Massimo Capone (Italy) Alessandro Colella	7–6^{(7–1)}, 6-4
Win	2-0	Apr 2012	Italy F6, Vicenza	Futures	Clay	(Italy) Federico Torresi	(Italy) Marco Speronello (Italy) Andrea Fava	3–6, 6–3, [10–8]
Loss	2-1	May 2012	Italy F7, Sanremo	Futures	Clay	(Italy) Matteo Donati	(Italy) Claudio Grassi (Latvia) Andis Juška	5–7, 7–6^{(7–2)}, [12–14]
Loss	2-2	Sep 2013	Italy F27, Santa Margherita Di Pula	Futures	Clay	(Italy) Matteo Rigamonti	(Italy) Pietro Rondoni (Italy) Riccardo Sinicropi	5-7, 5-7
Loss	2-3	Mar 2015	Italy F2, Trento	Futures	Carpet	(Republic of Ireland) Sam Barry	(Netherlands) Sander Arends (Netherlands) Niels Lootsma	6–7^{(2–7)}, 4–6
Loss	2-4	Apr 2015	Italy F6, Santa Margherita Di Pula	Futures	Clay	(Italy) Antonio Massara	(Italy) Marco Bartolotti (Italy) Davide Della Tommasina	4-6, 4-6
Win	3-4	Mar 2017	Italy F5, Santa Margherita Di Pula	Futures	Clay	(Italy) Andrea Basso	(Argentina) Juan Pablo Paz (Romania) Dragos Dima	6-4, 6-4
Win	4-4	Apr 2017	Italy F9, Santa Margherita Di Pula	Futures	Clay	(Italy) Lorenzo Frigerio	(Poland) Mateusz Kowalczyk (Poland) Grzegorz Panfil	6–3, 3–6, [10–7]
