= Guzzini Challenger =

- 2019 Guzzini Challenger

Defunct tennis tournament
- Event name: Recanati
- Location: Recanati, Italy
- Venue: Circolo Tennis Francesco; Guzzini
- Category: ATP Challenger Tour
- Surface: Hard
- Draw: 32S/24Q/16D
- Prize money: €42,500+H
- Website: Website

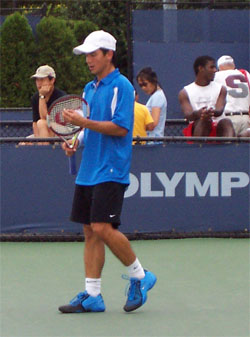
Germany's Björn Phau won the doubles in 2008 with Benedikt Dorsch

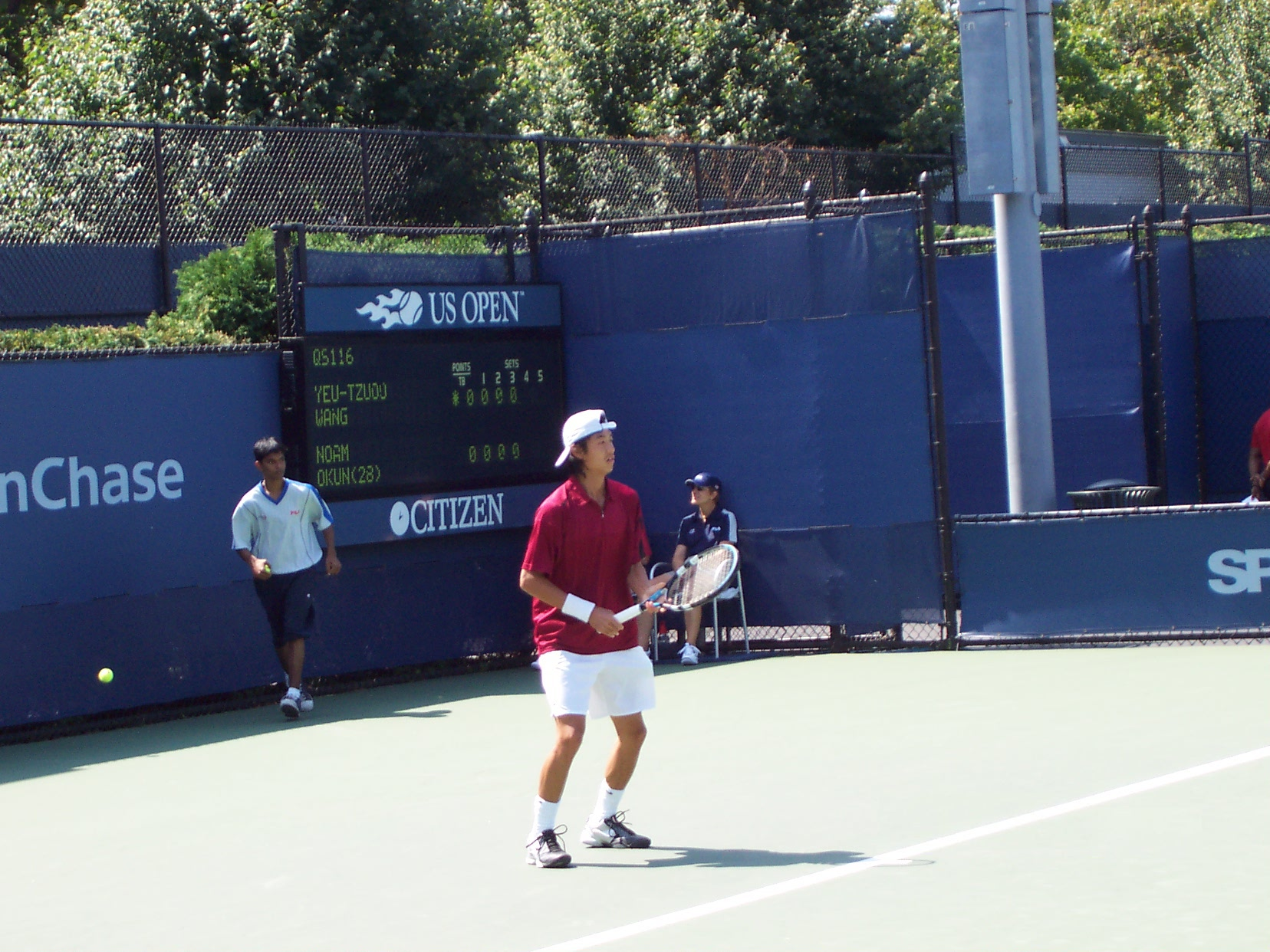
Chinese Taipei player Yeu-tzuoo Wang took the singles title in 2007 over Andrey Golubev

The Guzzini Challenger was a professional tennis tournament played on outdoor hardcourts. It was part of the ATP Challenger Tour. It was held annually at the Circolo Tennis Francesco Guzzini in Recanati, Italy, from 2003 until 2019.

== Past finals ==
=== Singles ===
Year	Champion	Runner-up	Score
2019	(Belarus) Egor Gerasimov	(Italy) Roberto Marcora	6–2, 7–5
2018	(Germany) Daniel Brands	(Spain) Adrián Menéndez Maceiras	7–5, 6–3
2017	(Croatia) Viktor Galović	(Bosnia and Herzegovina) Mirza Bašić	7–6^{(7–3)}, 6–4
2016	(Ukraine) Illya Marchenko	(Belarus) Ilya Ivashka	6–4, 6–4
2015	(Bosnia and Herzegovina) Mirza Bašić	(Lithuania) Ričardas Berankis	6–4, 3–6, 7–6^{(7–4)}
2014	(Luxembourg) Gilles Müller	(Serbia) Ilija Bozoljac	6–1, 6–2
2013	(Italy) Thomas Fabbiano	(France) David Guez	6–0, 6–3
2012	(Italy) Simone Bolelli	(France) Fabrice Martin	6–3, 6–2
2011	(France) Fabrice Martin	(France) Kenny de Schepper	6–1, 6–7^{(6–8)}, 7–6^{(7–3)}
2010	(Switzerland) Stéphane Bohli	(France) Adrian Mannarino	6–0, 3–6, 7–6^{(7–5)}
2009	(Switzerland) Stéphane Bohli	(Kazakhstan) Andrey Golubev	6–4, 7–6^{(7–4)}
2008	(Argentina) Horacio Zeballos	(Slovenia) Grega Žemlja	6–3, 6–4
2007	(Chinese Taipei) Wang Yeu-tzuoo	(Russia) Andrey Golubev	6–3, 3–6, 6–4
2006	(Italy) Davide Sanguinetti	(Italy) Simone Bolelli	6–4, 3–0 retired
2005	(Italy) Davide Sanguinetti	(Italy) Daniele Bracciali	6–4, 4–6, 6–3
2004	(Italy) Uros Vico	(Italy) Andrea Stoppini	6–7^{(5–7)}, 6–4, 6–4
2003	(Italy) Daniele Bracciali	(Italy) Massimo Dell'Acqua	7–6^{(7–0)}, 6–3

=== Doubles ===
Year	Champions	Runners-up	Score
2019	(Portugal) Gonçalo Oliveira (India) Ramkumar Ramanathan	(Italy) Andrea Vavassori (Spain) David Vega Hernández	6–2, 6–4
2018	(China) Gong Maoxin (China) Zhang Ze	(Ecuador) Gonzalo Escobar (Brazil) Fernando Romboli	2–6, 7–6^{(7–5)}, [10–8]
2017	(France) Jonathan Eysseric (France) Quentin Halys	(Italy) Julian Ocleppo (Italy) Andrea Vavassori	6–7^{(3–7)}, 6–4, [12–10]
2016	(Germany) Kevin Krawietz (France) Albano Olivetti	(Belgium) Ruben Bemelmans (Spain) Adrián Menéndez Maceiras	6–3, 7–6^{(7–4)}
2015	(India) Divij Sharan (United Kingdom) Ken Skupski	(Serbia) Ilija Bozoljac (Italy) Flavio Cipolla	4–6, 7–6^{(7–3)}, [10–6]
2014	(Serbia) Ilija Bozoljac (Serbia) Goran Tošić	(Republic of Ireland) James Cluskey (Lithuania) Laurynas Grigelis	5–7, 6–4, [10–5]
2013	(United Kingdom) Ken Skupski (United Kingdom) Neal Skupski	(Italy) Gianluigi Quinzi (Italy) Adelchi Virgili	6–4, 6–3
2012	(Australia) Brydan Klein (Australia) Dane Propoggia	(Croatia) Marin Draganja (Croatia) Dino Marcan	7–5, 2–6, [14–12]
2011	(Denmark) Frederik Nielsen (United Kingdom) Ken Skupski	(Italy) Federico Gaio (India) Purav Raja	6–4, 7–5
2010	(United Kingdom) Jamie Delgado (Croatia) Lovro Zovko	(France) Charles-Antoine Brézac (France) Vincent Stouff	7–6^{(8–6)}, 6–1
2009	(Denmark) Frederik Nielsen (Australia) Joseph Sirianni	(Italy) Adriano Biasella (Kazakhstan) Andrey Golubev	6–4, 3–6, [10–6]
2008	(Germany) Benedikt Dorsch (Germany) Björn Phau	(China) Yu Xin-yuan (China) Zeng Shao-Xuan	6–3, 7–5
2007	(Italy) Fabio Colangelo (Ukraine) Sergiy Stakhovsky	(China) Yu Xin-yuan (China) Zeng Shao-Xuan	1–6, 7–6^{(7–3)}, [10–7]
2006	(Italy) Simone Bolelli (Italy) Davide Sanguinetti	(Germany) Sebastian Rieschick (Serbia and Montenegro) Viktor Troicki	6–1, 3–6, [10–4]
2005	(Italy) Uros Vico (Croatia) Lovro Zovko	(Uzbekistan) Farrukh Dustov (Russia) Evgeny Korolev	7–6^{(7–2)}, 4–3 retired
2004	(Italy) Massimo Dell'Acqua (Italy) Uros Vico	(Italy) Daniele Giorgini (Italy) Federico Torresi	6–1, 6–4
2003	(Italy) Manuel Jorquera (Germany) Frank Moser	(France) Rodolphe Cadart (Israel) Dudi Sela	6–4, 7–5
