= 2016 Open Castilla y León – Men's doubles =

Men's doubles
- 2016 Open Castilla y León

Final
- Champions: (India) Purav Raja (India) Divij Sharan
- Runners-up: (Spain) Quino Muñoz (Japan) Akira Santillan
- Score: 6–3, 4–6, [10–8]

Events
Singles	men	women
Doubles	men	women
← 2015 ·	Open Castilla y León	· 2017 →

Alexander Kudryavtsev and Denys Molchanov were the defending champions but chose not to defend their title.

Purav Raja and Divij Sharan won the title after defeating Quino Muñoz and Akira Santillan 6–3, 4–6, [10–8] in the final.

== Seeds ==
1. (New Zealand) Marcus Daniell / (New Zealand) Michael Venus (quarterfinals)
2. (Sweden) Johan Brunström / (Sweden) Andreas Siljeström (semifinals)
3. (India) Purav Raja / (India) Divij Sharan (champions)
4. (France) Kenny de Schepper / (France) Albano Olivetti (first round)

== Draw ==
=== Key ===
- Q = Qualifier
- WC = Wild card
- LL = Lucky loser
- Alt = Alternate
- SE = Special exempt
- PR = Protected ranking
- ITF = ITF entry
- JE = Junior exempt
- w/o = Walkover
- r = Retired
- d = Defaulted
- SR = Special ranking

First round
(Norway) V Durasovic (Spain) Jaume Pla Malfeito	4	2
(France) R Boutillier (France) M Janvier	6	6
4	(France) K de Schepper (France) A Olivetti	4	4
WC	(Spain) J Muñoz (Japan) A Santillan	6	6
(France) D Guez (France) A Sidorenko	1	7	[10]
WC	(Spain) Jorge Hernando Ruano (Spain) Ricardo Villacorta-Alonso	6	5	[6]
WC	(Spain) Pablo Irigaray Guarné (Spain) Oscar Manciñeiras Cornella	w/o
(Russia) Alexandr Igoshin (Spain) Javier Pulgar-García
(Australia) A De Minaur (Spain) R Ortega Olmedo	3	6^{7}
3	(India) P Raja (India) D Sharan	6	7^{9}
(Slovakia) F Horanský (Czech Republic) Michal Konečný	3	6^{6}
(Switzerland) M Chiudinelli (Bosnia and Herzegovina) A Šetkić	6	7^{8}
(Belgium) R Bemelmans (Belgium) Y Mertens	4	3
2	(Sweden) J Brunström (Sweden) A Siljeström	6	6

Quarterfinals
1	(New Zealand) M Daniell (New Zealand) M Venus	6	6^{7}	[8]
(France) R Boutillier (France) M Janvier	3	7^{9}	[10]
WC	(Spain) J Muñoz (Japan) A Santillan	6	6
(France) D Guez (France) A Sidorenko	3	3
WC	(Spain) P Irigaray Guarné (Spain) O Manciñeiras Cornella	4	0
3	(India) P Raja (India) D Sharan	6	6
(Switzerland) M Chiudinelli (Bosnia and Herzegovina) A Šetkić	6^{5}	6^{3}
2	(Sweden) J Brunström (Sweden) A Siljeström	7^{7}	7^{7}

Semifinals
(France) R Boutillier (France) M Janvier
WC	(Spain) J Muñoz (Japan) A Santillan	w/o
3	(India) P Raja (India) D Sharan	6	7^{7}
2	(Sweden) J Brunström (Sweden) A Siljeström	4	6^{4}

Final
WC	(Spain) J Muñoz (Japan) A Santillan	3	6	[8]
3	(India) P Raja (India) D Sharan	6	4	[10]
