= 2015 Open Castilla y León – Singles =

Singles
- 2015 Open Castilla y León

Final
- Champion: (Russia) Evgeny Donskoy
- Runner-up: (Switzerland) Marco Chiudinelli
- Score: 7–6^{(7–2)}, 6–3

Events
| Singles | Doubles |
| ← 2014 · | Open Castilla y León | · 2016 → |

Adrian Mannarino was the defending champion, but did not participate this year.

Evgeny Donskoy won the tournament, defeating Marco Chiudinelli in the final, 7–6^{(7–2)}, 6–3.

== Seeds ==
1. (Spain) Marcel Granollers (semifinals)
2. (Germany) Dustin Brown (second round)
3. (Germany) Matthias Bachinger (first round)
4. (Spain) Adrián Menéndez-Maceiras (second round)
5. (Bosnia and Herzegovina) Mirza Bašić (quarterfinals)
6. (Germany) Peter Gojowczyk (second round)
7. (France) Vincent Millot (first round)
8. (Russia) Alexander Kudryavtsev (second round)

== Draw ==
=== Key ===
- Q = Qualifier
- WC = Wild card
- LL = Lucky loser
- Alt = Alternate
- SE = Special exempt
- PR = Protected ranking
- ITF = ITF entry
- JE = Junior exempt
- w/o = Walkover
- r = Retired
- d = Defaulted
- SR = Special ranking

=== Finals ===
Semifinals
1/WC | (Spain) Marcel Granollers | 2 | 6^{3}
(Russia) Evgeny Donskoy | 6 | 7^{7}
PR | (Switzerland) Marco Chiudinelli | 6^{7} | 6 | 6
(United States) Connor Smith | 7^{9} | 2 | 4

Final
(Russia) Evgeny Donskoy | 7^{7} | 6
PR | (Switzerland) Marco Chiudinelli | 6^{2} | 3

=== Top half ===
First round
1/WC | (Spain) M Granollers | 6 | 6
(Brazil) C Zampieri | 1 | 1
Q | (Spain) Georgi Rumenov | 4 | 6 | 6
WC | (South Korea) Y-s Chung | 6 | 1 | 3
(Belgium) Y Mertens | 6 | 6
Q | (France) Sébastien Boltz | 4 | 2
(Belarus) M Dubarenco | 2 | 1^{r}
8 | (Russia) A Kudryavtsev | 6 | 0
4 | (Spain) A Menéndez-Maceiras | 4 | 6 | 6
(France) Q Halys | 6 | 3 | 1
WC | (Spain) Jorge Ruano | 4 | 2
(Russia) E Donskoy | 6 | 6
(Italy) Erik Crepaldi | 1 | 1
(Russia) K Kravchuk | 6 | 6
LL | (Spain) R Ortega-Olmedo | 4 | 2
6 | (Germany) P Gojowczyk | 6 | 6

Second round
1/WC | (Spain) M Granollers | 7 | 6
Q | (Spain) G Rumenov | 5 | 2
(Belgium) Y Mertens | 6 | 6
8 | (Russia) A Kudryavtsev | 2 | 2
4 | (Spain) A Menéndez-Maceiras | 2 | 4
(Russia) E Donskoy | 6 | 6
(Russia) K Kravchuk | 6 | 6
6 | (Germany) P Gojowczyk | 4 | 2

Quarterfinals
1/WC | (Spain) M Granollers | 6 | 6
(Belgium) Y Mertens | 2 | 4
(Russia) E Donskoy | 6 | 6
(Russia) K Kravchuk | 4 | 4

Semifinals
1/WC | (Spain) M Granollers | 2 | 6^{3}
(Russia) E Donskoy | 6 | 7^{7}

=== Bottom half ===
First round
7 | (France) V Millot | 3 | 3
(Ukraine) D Molchanov | 6 | 6
PR | (Switzerland) M Chiudinelli | 6 | 6
WC | (Spain) Francisco Blanco Paris | 2 | 0
Q | (Belarus) E Gerasimov | 6 | 7
(Japan) H Moriya | 4 | 5
(France) D Guez | 6 | 6
3 | (Germany) M Bachinger | 4 | 3
5 | (Bosnia and Herzegovina) M Bašić | 6 | 6
(China) D Wu | 2 | 2
Q | (Croatia) N Mektić | 6 | 7
LL | (Italy) R Ghedin | 4 | 5
(United States) Connor Smith | 6 | 6
(Brazil) Henrique Cunha | 2 | 2
(Portugal) FF Silva | 3 | 6^{5}
2 | (Germany) D Brown | 6 | 7^{7}

Second round
(Ukraine) D Molchanov | 2 | 6^{2}
PR | (Switzerland) M Chiudinelli | 6 | 7^{7}
Q | (Belarus) E Gerasimov | 7^{7} | 6
(France) D Guez | 6^{4} | 4
5 | (Bosnia and Herzegovina) M Bašić | 6 | 6
Q | (Croatia) N Mektić | 4 | 4
(United States) C Smith | 6 | 6
2 | (Germany) D Brown | 4 | 2

Quarterfinals
PR | (Switzerland) M Chiudinelli | 6 | 5 | 7
Q | (Belarus) E Gerasimov | 3 | 7 | 5
5 | (Bosnia and Herzegovina) M Bašić | 6 | 2 | 5
(United States) C Smith | 1 | 6 | 7

Semifinals
PR | (Switzerland) M Chiudinelli | 6^{7} | 6 | 6
(United States) C Smith | 7^{9} | 2 | 4
