= 2015 Open Castilla y León – Doubles =

Doubles
- 2015 Open Castilla y León

Final
- Champions: (Russia) Alexander Kudryavtsev (Ukraine) Denys Molchanov
- Runners-up: (Belarus) Alexander Bury (Sweden) Andreas Siljeström
- Score: 6–2, 6–4

Events
| Singles | Doubles |
| ← 2014 · | Open Castilla y León | · 2016 → |

Victor Baluda and Alexander Kudryavtsev were the defending champions, but Baluda did not participate this year. Kudryavtsev played alongside Denys Molchanov and successfully defended the title.

== Seeds ==
1. (Belarus) Sergey Betov / (Russia) Michail Elgin (semifinals)
2. (Belarus) Alexander Bury / (Sweden) Andreas Siljeström (final)
3. (United Kingdom) Ken Skupski / (United Kingdom) Neal Skupski (semifinals)
4. (Thailand) Sanchai Ratiwatana / (Thailand) Sonchat Ratiwatana (first round)

== Draw ==
=== Key ===
- Q = Qualifier
- WC = Wild card
- LL = Lucky loser
- Alt = Alternate
- SE = Special exempt
- PR = Protected ranking
- ITF = ITF entry
- JE = Junior exempt
- w/o = Walkover
- r = Retired
- d = Defaulted
- SR = Special ranking

First round
1 | (Belarus) S Betov (Russia) M Elgin | 6 | 6
WC | (Spain) R Ortega-Olmedo (Spain) Georgi Rumenov | 2 | 2
(Russia) E Donskoy (France) A Sidorenko | 4 | 3
WC | (Spain) Iván Arenas-Gualda (Italy) Erik Crepaldi | 6 | 6
4 | (Thailand) Sa Ratiwatana (Thailand) So Ratiwatana | 4 | 4
(Russia) A Kudryavtsev (Ukraine) D Molchanov | 6 | 6
(Croatia) N Mektić (Croatia) A Šančić | 7 | 6
WC | (Spain) Francisco Blanco Paris (Spain) Jorge Ruano | 5 | 2
(Bosnia and Herzegovina) M Bašić (China) D Wu | 6^{5} | 6 | [14]
(Germany) M Bachinger (Germany) P Gojowczyk | 7^{7} | 1 | [16]
PR | (Germany) D Brown (Switzerland) M Chiudinelli | 7 | 4 | [8]
3 | (United Kingdom) K Skupski (United Kingdom) N Skupski | 5 | 6 | [10]
(Russia) K Kravchuk (India) D Sharan | 6 | 7^{7}
(Japan) H Moriya (India) J Nedunchezhiyan | 4 | 6^{4}
(Italy) R Ghedin (Romania) P Grigoriu | 7^{7} | 1 | [8]
2 | (Belarus) A Bury (Sweden) A Siljeström | 6^{3} | 6 | [10]

Quarterfinals
1 | (Belarus) S Betov (Russia) M Elgin | 6 | 6
WC | (Spain) I Arenas-Gualda (Italy) E Crepaldi | 4 | 2
(Russia) A Kudryavtsev (Ukraine) D Molchanov | 6 | 1 | [10]
(Croatia) N Mektić (Croatia) A Šančić | 4 | 7 | [7]
(Germany) M Bachinger (Germany) P Gojowczyk
3 | (United Kingdom) K Skupski (United Kingdom) N Skupski | w/o
(Russia) K Kravchuk (India) D Sharan | 6^{4} | 3
2 | (Belarus) A Bury (Sweden) A Siljeström | 7^{7} | 6

Semifinals
1 | (Belarus) S Betov (Russia) M Elgin | 7^{7} | 5 | [8]
(Russia) A Kudryavtsev (Ukraine) D Molchanov | 6^{4} | 7 | [10]
3 | (United Kingdom) K Skupski (United Kingdom) N Skupski | 2 | 6 | [8]
2 | (Belarus) A Bury (Sweden) A Siljeström | 6 | 4 | [10]

Final
(Russia) A Kudryavtsev (Ukraine) D Molchanov | 6 | 6
2 | (Belarus) A Bury (Sweden) A Siljeström | 2 | 4
