= 2013 Open Castilla y León – Singles =

Singles
- 2013 Open Castilla y León

Final
- Champion: (Spain) Pablo Carreño Busta
- Runner-up: (France) Albano Olivetti
- Score: 6–4, 7–6^{(7–2)}

Events
| Singles | Doubles |
| ← 2012 · | Open Castilla y León | · 2014 → |

Evgeny Donskoy was the defending champion, but chose to participate at the 2013 Odlum Brown Vancouver Open instead.

Pablo Carreño Busta won the title, defeating Albano Olivetti in the final, 6–4, 7–6^{(7–2)}.

== Seeds ==
1. (Spain) Pablo Carreño Busta (champion)
2. (Romania) Marius Copil (second round)
3. (Kazakhstan) Andrey Golubev (second round)
4. (Italy) Flavio Cipolla (first round)
5. (Switzerland) Marco Chiudinelli (semifinals)
6. (Belarus) Uladzimir Ignatik (first round)
7. (France) Florent Serra (quarterfinals)
8. (France) Pierre-Hugues Herbert (second round)

== Draw ==
=== Key ===
- Q = Qualifier
- WC = Wild card
- LL = Lucky loser
- Alt = Alternate
- SE = Special exempt
- PR = Protected ranking
- ITF = ITF entry
- JE = Junior exempt
- w/o = Walkover
- r = Retired
- d = Defaulted
- SR = Special ranking

=== Finals ===
Semifinals
1 | (Spain) Pablo Carreño Busta | 7 | 6
5 | (Switzerland) Marco Chiudinelli | 5 | 4
WC | (Spain) Roberto Ortega-Olmedo | 3 | 6 | 6^{10}
PR | (France) Albano Olivetti | 6 | 3 | 7^{12}

Final
1 | (Spain) Pablo Carreño Busta | 6 | 7^{7}
PR | (France) Albano Olivetti | 4 | 6^{2}

=== Top half ===
First round
1 | (Spain) P Carreño Busta | 7^{7} | 6
(Greece) A Jakupovic | 6^{1} | 3
(Spain) A Brugués-Davi | 6 | 4 | 6^{3}
(United Kingdom) A Ward | 4 | 6 | 7^{7}
(Spain) A Artuñedo Martínavarr | 1^{r}
(Spain) J Checa Calvo | 2
(Spain) R Carballés Baena | 6 | 3 | 4
7 | (France) F Serra | 4 | 6 | 6
4 | (Italy) F Cipolla | 6^{5} | 4
Q | (Italy) Erik Crepaldi | 7^{7} | 6
(Greece) T Angelinos | 6 | 6
WC | (Spain) Iván Arenas-Gualda | 2 | 4
WC | (Romania) Christian Florentin Voinea | 6^{4} | 1^{r}
(Russia) A Lobkov | 7^{7} | 4
(France) F Martin | 5 | 3
5 | (Switzerland) M Chiudinelli | 7 | 6

Second round
1 | (Spain) P Carreño Busta | 6 | 7^{7}
(United Kingdom) A Ward | 1 | 6^{3}
(Spain) J Checa Calvo | 2 | 0
7 | (France) F Serra | 6 | 6
Q | (Italy) E Crepaldi | 3 | 2
(Greece) T Angelinos | 6 | 6
(Russia) A Lobkov | 1 | 0
5 | (Switzerland) M Chiudinelli | 6 | 6

Quarterfinals
1 | (Spain) P Carreño Busta | 6 | 6
7 | (France) F Serra | 3 | 1
(Greece) T Angelinos | 1 | 6 | 5
5 | (Switzerland) M Chiudinelli | 6 | 3 | 7

Semifinals
1 | (Spain) P Carreño Busta | 7 | 6
5 | (Switzerland) M Chiudinelli | 5 | 4

=== Bottom half ===
First round
6 | (Belarus) U Ignatik | 6^{2} | 6^{5}
(France) M Teixeira | 7^{7} | 7^{7}
WC | (Spain) R Ortega-Olmedo | 6 | 6
(Russia) M Elgin | 4 | 1
(Spain) G Granollers | 7 | 4 | 6
(Netherlands) M Middelkoop | 5 | 6 | 3
(Spain) E López-Pérez | 3 | 5
3 | (Kazakhstan) A Golubev | 6 | 7
8 | (France) P-H Herbert | 6 | 6
(Brazil) T Alves | 3 | 2
Alt | (Spain) I Navarro | 3 | 6^{4}
PR | (France) A Olivetti | 6 | 7^{7}
Q | (United Kingdom) D Rice | 6^{4} | 0
(Hungary) M Fucsovics | 7^{7} | 6
WC | (Spain) Ricardo Villacorta-Alonso | 2 | 3
2 | (Romania) M Copil | 6 | 6

Second round
(France) M Teixeira | 7^{7} | 1 | 1
WC | (Spain) R Ortega-Olmedo | 6^{1} | 6 | 6
(Spain) G Granollers | 6^{4} | 6 | 7^{7}
3 | (Kazakhstan) A Golubev | 7 | 3 | 6^{5}
8 | (France) P-H Herbert | 6^{7} | 4
PR | (France) A Olivetti | 7^{9} | 6
(Hungary) M Fucsovics | 6 | 6
2 | (Romania) M Copil | 4 | 4

Quarterfinals
WC | (Spain) R Ortega-Olmedo | 7^{7} | 6
(Spain) G Granollers | 6^{5} | 3
PR | (France) A Olivetti | 7 | 6
(Hungary) M Fucsovics | 5 | 4

Semifinals
WC | (Spain) R Ortega-Olmedo | 3 | 6 | 6^{10}
PR | (France) A Olivetti | 6 | 3 | 7^{12}
