= 2013 Open Castilla y León – Doubles =

Doubles
- 2013 Open Castilla y León

Final
- Champions: (United Kingdom) Ken Skupski (United Kingdom) Neal Skupski
- Runners-up: (Russia) Mikhail Elgin (Belarus) Uladzimir Ignatik
- Score: 6–3, 6–7^{(4–7)}, [10–6]

Events
Singles	Doubles
← 2012 ·	Open Castilla y León	· 2014 →

Stefano Ianni and Florin Mergea were the defending champions, but decided not to participate.

Ken and Neal Skupski won the title, defeating Mikhail Elgin and Uladzimir Ignatik in the final, 6–3, 6–7^{(4–7)}, [10–6].

== Seeds ==
1. (United Kingdom) Jamie Delgado / (Germany) Frank Moser (semifinals)
2. (United Kingdom) Ken Skupski / (United Kingdom) Neal Skupski (champion)
3. (Russia) Mikhail Elgin / (Belarus) Uladzimir Ignatik (final)
4. (Italy) Flavio Cipolla / (Italy) Alessandro Motti (first round)

== Draw ==
=== Key ===
- Q = Qualifier
- WC = Wild card
- LL = Lucky loser
- Alt = Alternate
- SE = Special exempt
- PR = Protected ranking
- ITF = ITF entry
- JE = Junior exempt
- w/o = Walkover
- r = Retired
- d = Defaulted
- SR = Special ranking

=== Draw ===
First round
1	(United Kingdom) J Delgado (Germany) F Moser	7	7^{7}
(France) Antoine Benneteau (France) M Teixeira	5	6^{4}
(Spain) Iván Arenas-Gualda (Spain) E López-Pérez	1	1
(Republic of Ireland) J Cluskey (France) F Martin	6	6
3	(Russia) M Elgin (Belarus) U Ignatik	6	7^{7}
WC	(Spain) J Checa Calvo (Greece) A Jakupovic	1	6^{4}
(France) P-H Herbert (France) A Olivetti	6	6
(Spain) R Carballés Baena (Spain) P Carreño Busta	3	3
WC	(Spain) R Ortega Olmedo (Spain) Ricardo Villacorta-Alonso	1	2
(United Kingdom) D Rice (United Kingdom) S Thornley	6	6
(Uruguay) A Behar (Spain) Carlos Poch-Grandin	7^{7}	7^{7}
4	(Italy) F Cipolla (Italy) A Motti	6^{3}	6^{2}
(Spain) A Brugués-Davi (Spain) I Navarro	6	6
(Greece) T Angelinos (Russia) A Lobkov	4	0
WC	(Spain) Jorge Hernando Ruano (Spain) Ruben Hernando Ruano	2	3
2	(United Kingdom) K Skupski (United Kingdom) N Skupski	6	6

Quarterfinals
1	(United Kingdom) J Delgado (Germany) F Moser	6	6
(Republic of Ireland) J Cluskey (France) F Martin	2	2
3	(Russia) M Elgin (Belarus) U Ignatik	6^{5}	6	[12]
(France) P-H Herbert (France) A Olivetti	7^{7}	3	[10]
(United Kingdom) D Rice (United Kingdom) S Thornley	4	7	[8]
(Uruguay) A Behar (Spain) C Poch-Grandin	6	5	[10]
(Spain) A Brugués-Davi (Spain) I Navarro	3	1
2	(United Kingdom) K Skupski (United Kingdom) N Skupski	6	6

Semifinals
1	(United Kingdom) J Delgado (Germany) F Moser	4	7^{7}	[3]
3	(Russia) M Elgin (Belarus) U Ignatik	6	6^{4}	[10]
(Uruguay) A Behar (Spain) C Poch-Grandin	3	4
2	(United Kingdom) K Skupski (United Kingdom) N Skupski	6	6

Final
3	(Russia) M Elgin (Belarus) U Ignatik	3	7^{7}	[6]
2	(United Kingdom) K Skupski (United Kingdom) N Skupski	6	6^{4}	[10]
