= 2016 Open Castilla y León – Men's singles =

Men's singles
- 2016 Open Castilla y León

Final
- Champion: (Italy) Luca Vanni
- Runner-up: (Ukraine) Illya Marchenko
- Score: 6–4, 3–6, 6–3

Events
Singles	men	women
Doubles	men	women
← 2015 ·	Open Castilla y León	· 2017 →

Evgeny Donskoy was the defending champion but chose not to defend his title.

Luca Vanni won the title after defeating Illya Marchenko 6–4, 3–6, 6–3 in the final.

== Seeds ==
1. (Spain) Nicolás Almagro (quarterfinals)
2. (Czech Republic) Lukáš Rosol (second round)
3. (Ukraine) Illya Marchenko (final)
4. (Switzerland) Marco Chiudinelli (first round)
5. (Bosnia and Herzegovina) Mirza Bašić (semifinals)
6. (Poland) Jerzy Janowicz (first round)
7. (France) Kenny de Schepper (quarterfinals)
8. (Hungary) Márton Fucsovics (semifinals)

== Draw ==
=== Key ===
- Q = Qualifier
- WC = Wild card
- LL = Lucky loser
- Alt = Alternate
- SE = Special exempt
- PR = Protected ranking
- ITF = ITF entry
- JE = Junior exempt
- w/o = Walkover
- r = Retired
- d = Defaulted
- SR = Special ranking

=== Finals ===
Semifinals
5	(Bosnia and Herzegovina) Mirza Bašić	4	3
(Italy) Luca Vanni	6	6
3	(Ukraine) Illya Marchenko	6	6
8	(Hungary) Márton Fucsovics	3	4

Final
(Italy) Luca Vanni	6	3	6
3	(Ukraine) Illya Marchenko	4	6	3

=== Top half ===
First round
1/WC	(Spain) N Almagro	6	6
(France) M Janvier	3	2
WC	(Spain) Ricardo Villacorta-Alonso	6	6
(Croatia) N Mektić	4	4
(Czech Republic) Michal Konečný	5	6	7
(France) D Guez	7	2	5
Q	(United Kingdom) D Cox	2	2
5	(Bosnia and Herzegovina) M Bašić	6	6
4	(Switzerland) M Chiudinelli	6	4	3
(Japan) A Santillan	4	6	6
WC	(Spain) Jorge Hernando Ruano	6	6
(Egypt) M Safwat	2	3
(Belgium) Y Mertens	6	6
(Spain) Pablo Vivero González	4	2
(Italy) L Vanni	2	7^{7}	7
6	(Poland) J Janowicz	6	6^{3}	5

Second round
1/WC	(Spain) N Almagro	7	6
WC	(Spain) R Villacorta-Alonso	5	4
(Czech Republic) M Konečný	4	3
5	(Bosnia and Herzegovina) M Bašić	6	6
(Japan) A Santillan	6	6
WC	(Spain) J Hernando Ruano	4	0
(Belgium) Y Mertens	7^{7}	0	3
(Italy) L Vanni	6^{4}	6	6

Quarterfinals
1/WC	(Spain) N Almagro	7	6^{5}	6^{4}
5	(Bosnia and Herzegovina) M Bašić	5	7^{7}	7^{7}
(Japan) A Santillan	6^{5}	3
(Italy) L Vanni	7^{7}	6

Semifinals
5	(Bosnia and Herzegovina) M Bašić	4	3
(Italy) L Vanni	6	6

=== Bottom half ===
First round
7	(France) K de Schepper	6	6
PR	(France) R Boutillier	3	3
(Slovakia) F Horanský	1	3
(Spain) R Ortega Olmedo	6	6
(Belgium) R Bemelmans	6	6
Q	(Spain) Jaume Pla Malfeito	0	3
Q	(Australia) A De Minaur	4	4
3	(Ukraine) I Marchenko	6	6
8	(Hungary) M Fucsovics	7^{7}	6
(France) A Sidorenko	6^{1}	2
(Bosnia and Herzegovina) A Šetkić	6	7^{7}
PR	(France) A Olivetti	3	6^{4}
(Spain) A Menéndez-Maceiras	6^{3}	6	6
(Colombia) E Struvay	7^{7}	2	4
Q	(Norway) V Durasovic	4	4
2	(Czech Republic) L Rosol	6	6

Second round
7	(France) K de Schepper	6	6
(Spain) R Ortega Olmedo	3	3
(Belgium) R Bemelmans	3	4
3	(Ukraine) I Marchenko	6	6
8	(Hungary) M Fucsovics	6	6
(Bosnia and Herzegovina) A Šetkić	2	2
(Spain) A Menéndez-Maceiras	6	6^{3}	6
2	(Czech Republic) L Rosol	3	7^{7}	4

Quarterfinals
7	(France) K de Schepper	5	4
3	(Ukraine) I Marchenko	7	6
8	(Hungary) M Fucsovics	6	6^{7}	6
(Spain) A Menéndez-Maceiras	4	7^{9}	4

Semifinals
3	(Ukraine) I Marchenko	6	6
8	(Hungary) M Fucsovics	3	4
