= 2025 Open Castilla y León – Doubles =

Doubles
- 2025 Open Castilla y León

Final
- Champions: (Chile) Matías Soto (Bolivia) Federico Zeballos
- Runners-up: (France) Arthur Reymond (France) Luca Sanchez
- Score: 3–6, 7–6^{(7–5)}, [16–14]

Events
Singles	Doubles
- Open Castilla y León

Dan Added and Arthur Reymond were the defending champions but only Reymond chose to defend his title, partnering Luca Sanchez. They lost in the final to Matías Soto and Federico Zeballos.

Soto and Zeballos won the title after defeating Reymond and Sanchez 3–6, 7–6^{(7–5)}, [16–14] in the final.

== Seeds ==
1. (United Kingdom) David Stevenson / (Czech Republic) Matěj Vocel (quarterfinals)
2. (Chile) Matías Soto / (Bolivia) Federico Zeballos (champions)
3. (Denmark) Johannes Ingildsen / (Portugal) Tiago Pereira (first round)
4. (France) Arthur Reymond / (France) Luca Sanchez (final)

== Draw ==
Key

- Q = Qualifier
- WC = Wild card
- LL = Lucky loser
- Alt = Alternate
- ITF = ITF entry
- PR = Protected ranking
- SR = Special ranking
- SE = Special exempt
- JE = Junior exempt
- JR = Junior Accelerator Programme entrant
- CO = College Accelerator Programme entrant
- NG = Next Gen Accelerator Program entrant
- w/o = Walkover
- r = Retired
- d = Defaulted

=== Draw ===
First round
1	(United Kingdom) D Stevenson (Czech Republic) M Vocel	6	7^{7}
(Lithuania) E Butvilas (Jordan) A Shelbayh	4	6^{3}
(Czech Republic) D Poljak (China) A Wang	3	4
(Brazil) M Alves (France) A Bouquier	6	6
4	(France) A Reymond (France) L Sanchez	6	6
(Spain) N Álvarez Varona (Spain) A Barroso Campos	3	2
(France) R Bertrand (India) A Kalyanpur	4	3
(France) C Chidekh (Israel) R Stepanov	6	6
(Bolivia) B Arias (Uruguay) I Carou	6	7^{7}
WC	(Spain) John Echeverría (Spain) I Montes de la Torre	4	6^{4}
(Philippines) FC Alcantara (China) F Sun	6	7^{7}
3	(Denmark) J Ingildsen (Portugal) T Pereira	4	6^{4}
(China) J Cui (Uzbekistan) K Sultanov	6	6
Alt	(Spain) Iván Marrero Curbelo (Italy) Augusto Virgili	3	3
(Georgia (country)) A Bakshi (Georgia (country)) S Purtseladze	1	4
2	(Chile) M Soto (Bolivia) F Zeballos	6	6

Quarterfinals
1	(United Kingdom) D Stevenson (Czech Republic) M Vocel	6^{7}	7	[8]
(Brazil) M Alves (France) A Bouquier	7^{9}	5	[10]
4	(France) A Reymond (France) L Sanchez	7^{7}	6
(France) C Chidekh (Israel) R Stepanov	6^{2}	4
(Bolivia) B Arias (Uruguay) I Carou	6	6^{6}	[10]
(Philippines) FC Alcantara (China) F Sun	2	7^{8}	[7]
(China) J Cui (Uzbekistan) K Sultanov	7^{7}	3	[10]
2	(Chile) M Soto (Bolivia) F Zeballos	6^{5}	6	[12]

Semifinals
(Brazil) M Alves (France) A Bouquier	4	6	[9]
4	(France) A Reymond (France) L Sanchez	6	4	[11]
(Bolivia) B Arias (Uruguay) I Carou	3	2
2	(Chile) M Soto (Bolivia) F Zeballos	6	6

Final
4	(France) A Reymond (France) L Sanchez	6	6^{5}	[14]
2	(Chile) M Soto (Bolivia) F Zeballos	3	7^{7}	[16]
