= 2022 Open Castilla y León – Singles =

Singles
- 2022 Open Castilla y León

Final
- Champion: (France) Hugo Grenier
- Runner-up: (France) Constant Lestienne
- Score: 7–5, 6–3

Events
Singles	Doubles
- Open Castilla y León

Benjamin Bonzi was the defending champion but chose not to defend his title.

Hugo Grenier won the title after defeating Constant Lestienne 7–5, 6–3 in the final.

== Seeds ==
1. (Portugal) Nuno Borges (quarterfinals)
2. (France) Constant Lestienne (final)
3. (Spain) Fernando Verdasco (second round)
4. (France) Hugo Grenier (champion)
5. (France) Ugo Humbert (semifinals)
6. (Turkey) Altuğ Çelikbilek (first round)
7. (Kazakhstan) Dmitry Popko (first round)
8. (France) Grégoire Barrère (quarterfinals)

== Draw ==
Key

- Q = Qualifier
- WC = Wild card
- LL = Lucky loser
- Alt = Alternate
- ITF = ITF entry
- PR = Protected ranking
- SR = Special ranking
- SE = Special exempt
- JE = Junior exempt
- JR = Junior Accelerator Programme entrant
- CO = College Accelerator Programme entrant
- NG = Next Gen Accelerator Program entrant
- w/o = Walkover
- r = Retired
- d = Defaulted

=== Finals ===
Semifinals
5	(France) Ugo Humbert	7^{7}	5	2
4	(France) Hugo Grenier	6^{5}	7	6
(Belgium) Michael Geerts	6	5	6^{4}
2	(France) Constant Lestienne	2	7	7^{7}

Final
4	(France) Hugo Grenier	7	6
2	(France) Constant Lestienne	5	3

=== Top half ===
First round
1	(Portugal) N Borges	6	6
(Bosnia and Herzegovina) M Bašić	3	3
Q	A Kachmazov	0	6	7^{7}
Q	(Uzbekistan) D Istomin	6	4	6^{4}
(Germany) D Masur	6	6
E Donskoy	4	4
Q	(Brazil) G Décamps	3	4
5	(France) U Humbert	6	6
4	(France) H Grenier	6	6
WC	(Spain) A Moro Cañas	4	3
Q	(Spain) A Menéndez Maceiras	2	4
(Germany) N Kuhn	6	6
Alt	(Spain) N Álvarez Varona	7	5	1
(Switzerland) A Bellier	5	7	6
E Karlovskiy	1	3
8	(France) G Barrère	6	6

Second round
1	(Portugal) N Borges	6	6
Q	A Kachmazov	1	2
(Germany) D Masur	3	3
5	(France) U Humbert	6	6
4	(France) H Grenier	6	6
(Germany) N Kuhn	4	4
(Switzerland) A Bellier	4	4
8	(France) G Barrère	6	6

Quarterfinals
1	(Portugal) N Borges	6^{6}	4
5	(France) U Humbert	7^{8}	6
4	(France) H Grenier	6	6
8	(France) G Barrère	2	2

Semifinals
5	(France) U Humbert	7^{7}	5	2
4	(France) H Grenier	6^{5}	7	6

=== Bottom half ===
First round
7	(Kazakhstan) D Popko	4	4
(Belgium) M Geerts	6	6
SE	(Kazakhstan) D Yevseyev	6	5	6
WC	(Spain) D Rincón	2	7	3
(United Kingdom) P Jubb	6^{5}	2
(United States) Em Nava	7^{7}	6
(Japan) H Moriya	4	2
3	(Spain) F Verdasco	6	6
6	(Turkey) A Çelikbilek	0	2
Q	(Zimbabwe) B Lock	6	6
A Kuznetsov	7^{7}	1	3
Alt	(Ukraine) I Marchenko	6^{4}	6	6
(France) A Escoffier	6	6
WC	(Spain) Julio César Porras	2	3
Q	(Spain) A Barroso Campos	6	2	4
2	(France) C Lestienne	4	6	6

Second round
(Belgium) M Geerts	6	6
SE	(Kazakhstan) D Yevseyev	4	3
(United States) Em Nava	7^{10}	7
3	(Spain) F Verdasco	6^{8}	5
Q	(Zimbabwe) B Lock	7^{8}	2	6
Alt	(Ukraine) I Marchenko	6^{6}	6	3
(France) A Escoffier	3	3
2	(France) C Lestienne	6	6

Quarterfinals
(Belgium) M Geerts	6	6
(United States) Em Nava	4	4
Q	(Zimbabwe) B Lock	6^{8}	6	3
2	(France) C Lestienne	7^{10}	4	6

Semifinals
(Belgium) M Geerts	6	5	6^{4}
2	(France) C Lestienne	2	7	7^{7}
