= 2025 Open Castilla y León – Singles =

Singles
- 2025 Open Castilla y León

Final
- Champion: (United Kingdom) George Loffhagen
- Runner-up: (Spain) Nicolás Álvarez Varona
- Score: 7–6^{(7–4)}, 6–7^{(4–7)}, 6–4

Events
Singles	Doubles
- Open Castilla y León

Antoine Escoffier was the defending champion but lost in the second round to Edas Butvilas.

George Loffhagen won the title after defeating Nicolás Álvarez Varona 7–6^{(7–4)}, 6–7^{(4–7)}, 6–4 in the final.

== Seeds ==
1. (Croatia) Duje Ajduković (first round)
2. (France) Hugo Grenier (second round)
3. (Tunisia) Aziz Dougaz (second round, withdrew)
4. (France) Arthur Bouquier (first round)
5. (United Kingdom) Johannus Monday (quarterfinals)
6. (United Kingdom) Oliver Crawford (quarterfinals)
7. (France) Clément Chidekh (first round)
8. (France) Antoine Escoffier (second round)

== Draw ==
Key

- Q = Qualifier
- WC = Wild card
- LL = Lucky loser
- Alt = Alternate
- ITF = ITF entry
- PR = Protected ranking
- SR = Special ranking
- SE = Special exempt
- JE = Junior exempt
- JR = Junior Accelerator Programme entrant
- CO = College Accelerator Programme entrant
- NG = Next Gen Accelerator Program entrant
- w/o = Walkover
- r = Retired
- d = Defaulted

=== Finals ===
Semifinals
NG	(India) Aryan Shah	5	6	3
(Spain) Nicolás Álvarez Varona	7	2	6
(Lithuania) Edas Butvilas	3	6	6^{5}
(United Kingdom) George Loffhagen	6	3	7^{7}

Final
(Spain) Nicolás Álvarez Varona	6^{4}	7^{7}	4
(United Kingdom) George Loffhagen	7^{7}	6^{4}	6

=== Top half ===
First round
1	(Croatia) D Ajduković	6	4	4
NG	(India) Aryan Shah	4	6	6
(Georgia (country)) S Purtseladze	4	6	6
(Uzbekistan) K Sultanov	6	4	3
(France) R Bertrand	6	7^{11}
(China) J Cui	0	6^{9}
(Chile) M Soto	3	6^{2}
6	(United Kingdom) O Crawford	6	7^{7}
3	(Tunisia) A Dougaz	6	3	7
Q	(France) Robin Catry	3	6	5
(China) F Sun	3	2
(Spain) N Álvarez Varona	6	6
(Brazil) M Alves	4	4
WC	(Spain) I Montes de la Torre	6	6
Q	(France) A Reymond	4	6^{4}
5	(United Kingdom) J Monday	6	7^{7}

Second round
NG	(India) A Shah	6	6
(Georgia (country)) S Purtseladze	4	4
(France) R Bertrand	1	2
6	(United Kingdom) O Crawford	6	6
3	(Tunisia) A Dougaz
(Spain) N Álvarez Varona	w/o
WC	(Spain) I Montes de la Torre	6	5	3
5	(United Kingdom) J Monday	4	7	6

Quarterfinals
NG	(India) A Shah	7^{7}	6
6	(United Kingdom) O Crawford	6^{4}	4
(Spain) N Álvarez Varona	6	7^{7}
5	(United Kingdom) J Monday	4	6^{5}

Semifinals
NG	(India) A Shah	5	6	3
(Spain) N Álvarez Varona	7	2	6

=== Bottom half ===
First round
8	(France) A Escoffier	6	1	6
Q	(Spain) John Echeverría	4	6	3
Q	(Jordan) A Shelbayh	1	3
(Lithuania) E Butvilas	6	6
(Ivory Coast) E Coulibaly	6^{5}	6^{5}
Alt	(Italy) R Brancaccio	7^{7}	7^{7}
Q	(Colombia) A Soriano Barrera	6	1	6
4	(France) A Bouquier	1	6	2
7	(France) C Chidekh	4	6	1
(France) M Martineau	6	3	6
WC	(Spain) R Jódar	6	6
Q	(Germany) M Wiskandt	2	3
(United Kingdom) R Peniston	2	5
(United Kingdom) G Loffhagen	6	7
WC	(Spain) Mario González Fernández	3	1
2	(France) H Grenier	6	6

Second round
8	(France) A Escoffier	6	1	1
(Lithuania) E Butvilas	3	6	6
Alt	(Italy) R Brancaccio	6^{3}	7^{7}	6^{4}
Q	(Colombia) A Soriano Barrera	7^{7}	6^{5}	7^{7}
(France) M Martineau	7^{7}	6^{4}	3
WC	(Spain) R Jódar	6^{4}	7^{7}	6
(United Kingdom) G Loffhagen	7^{7}	6^{4}	6
2	(France) H Grenier	6^{4}	7^{7}	4

Quarterfinals
(Lithuania) E Butvilas	7^{10}	7^{7}
Q	(Colombia) A Soriano Barrera	6^{8}	6^{5}
WC	(Spain) R Jódar	4	6^{5}
(United Kingdom) G Loffhagen	6	7^{7}

Semifinals
(Lithuania) E Butvilas	3	6	6^{5}
(United Kingdom) G Loffhagen	6	3	7^{7}
