= 2011 Open Castilla y León – Singles =

Singles
- 2011 Open Castilla y León

Final
- Champion: (Slovakia) Karol Beck
- Runner-up: (France) Grégoire Burquier
- Score: 6–4, 7–6^{(7–4)}

Events
| Singles | Doubles |
- Open Castilla y León

Daniel Gimeno Traver was the defending champion, but chose not to participate this year.
3rd seed Karol Beck won this tournament, defeating Konstantin Kravchuk, Pablo Carreño Busta, Henri Kontinen, Marco Chiudinelli and Grégoire Burquier in the final.

== Seeds ==
1. (Kazakhstan) Mikhail Kukushkin (first round)
2. (France) Nicolas Mahut (quarterfinals)
3. (Slovakia) Karol Beck (champion)
4. (Germany) Rainer Schüttler (second round)
5. (Russia) Teymuraz Gabashvili (quarterfinals)
6. (France) Kenny de Schepper (first round)
7. (Belgium) Ruben Bemelmans (second round)
8. (France) Arnaud Clément (first round)

== Draw ==
Key

- Q = Qualifier
- WC = Wild card
- LL = Lucky loser
- Alt = Alternate
- ITF = ITF entry
- PR = Protected ranking
- SR = Special ranking
- SE = Special exempt
- JE = Junior exempt
- JR = Junior Accelerator Programme entrant
- CO = College Accelerator Programme entrant
- NG = Next Gen Accelerator Program entrant
- w/o = Walkover
- r = Retired
- d = Defaulted

=== Finals ===
Semifinals
(Switzerland) Marco Chiudinelli | 6^{7} | 2
3 | (Slovakia) Karol Beck | 7^{9} | 6
(France) Grégoire Burquier | 7^{7} | 6^{2} | 6
(Russia) Evgeny Donskoy | 6^{5} | 7^{7} | 3

Final
3 | (Slovakia) Karol Beck | 6 | 7^{7}
(France) Grégoire Burquier | 4 | 6^{4}

=== Top half ===
First round
1 | (Kazakhstan) M Kukushkin | 6^{4} | 2
(Portugal) J Sousa | 7^{7} | 6
(Republic of Ireland) C Niland | 4 | 6 | 5
(Switzerland) M Chiudinelli | 6 | 2 | 7
(Slovakia) L Lacko | 2 | 6 | 2
Q | (Croatia) N Mektić | 6 | 3 | 6
LL | (France) A Olivetti | 6^{3} | 6^{7}
5 | (Russia) T Gabashvili | 7^{7} | 7^{9}
3 | (Slovakia) K Beck | 4 | 7 | 7
(Russia) K Kravchuk | 6 | 5 | 5
WC | (Spain) P Carreño Busta | 4 | 7^{7} | 7^{7}
(Spain) I Navarro | 6 | 6^{5} | 6^{2}
WC | (Spain) G Alcaide | 1 | 7^{7} | 6^{2}
(Spain) R Bautista Agut | 6 | 6^{2} | 7^{7}
SE | (Finland) H Kontinen | 7^{7} | 6^{1} | 6
6 | (France) K de Schepper | 6^{1} | 7^{7} | 4

Second round
(Portugal) J Sousa | 4 | 6^{6}
(Switzerland) M Chiudinelli | 6 | 7^{8}
Q | (Croatia) N Mektić | 5 | 6 | 2
5 | (Russia) T Gabashvili | 7 | 2 | 6
3 | (Slovakia) K Beck | 7^{8} | 6
WC | (Spain) P Carreño Busta | 6^{6} | 1
(Spain) R Bautista Agut | 4 | 6 | 4
SE | (Finland) H Kontinen | 6 | 3 | 6

Quarterfinals
(Switzerland) M Chiudinelli | 6 | 4 | 6
5 | (Russia) T Gabashvili | 2 | 6 | 3
3 | (Slovakia) K Beck | 6 | 6
SE | (Finland) H Kontinen | 4 | 2

Semifinals
(Switzerland) M Chiudinelli | 6^{7} | 2
3 | (Slovakia) K Beck | 7^{9} | 6

=== Bottom half ===
First round
8 | (France) A Clément | 2 | 6 | 6^{8}
(Netherlands) I Sijsling | 6 | 1 | 7^{10}
(Denmark) F Nielsen | 2 | 2
(France) G Burquier | 6 | 6
SE | (France) F Martin | 7 | 2 | 6
Q | (Bolivia) F Zeballos | 5 | 6 | 3
Q | (Spain) A Menéndez | 6^{2} | 4
4 | (Germany) R Schüttler | 7^{7} | 6
7 | (Belgium) R Bemelmans | 5 | 6 | 6
(France) V Millot | 7 | 1 | 4
WC | (Romania) Christian Voinea | 2 | 1
(Russia) E Donskoy | 6 | 6
WC | (Spain) G Granollers | 7^{7} | 4 | 6
Q | (Spain) J Pulgar-García | 6^{4} | 6 | 3
(Germany) S Rieschick | 1 | 2
2 | (France) N Mahut | 6 | 6

Second round
(Netherlands) I Sijsling | 6 | 4 | 4
(France) G Burquier | 4 | 6 | 6
SE | (France) F Martin | 7^{7} | 6
4 | (Germany) R Schüttler | 6^{5} | 0
7 | (Belgium) R Bemelmans | 3 | 6 | 4
(Russia) E Donskoy | 6 | 3 | 6
WC | (Spain) G Granollers | 5 | 3
2 | (France) N Mahut | 7 | 6

Quarterfinals
(France) G Burquier | 6^{8} | 6 | 6
SE | (France) F Martin | 7^{10} | 4 | 4
(Russia) E Donskoy | 7^{7} | 6
2 | (France) N Mahut | 6^{4} | 4

Semifinals
(France) G Burquier | 7^{7} | 6^{2} | 6
(Russia) E Donskoy | 6^{5} | 7^{7} | 3
