= 2011 Open Castilla y León – Doubles =

Doubles
- 2011 Open Castilla y León

Final
- Champions: (Sweden) Johan Brunström; (Denmark) Frederik Nielsen
- Runners-up: (France) Nicolas Mahut; (Croatia) Lovro Zovko
- Score: 6–2, 3–6, [10–6]

Events
Singles	Doubles
- Open Castilla y León

Thiago Alves and Franco Ferreiro were the defending champions, however decided not to participate.
Johan Brunström and Frederik Nielsen won the title. They won against Nicolas Mahut and Lovro Zovko 6–2, 3–6, [10–6] in the final.

== Seeds ==
1. (United Kingdom) Jamie Delgado / (United Kingdom) Jonathan Marray (first round)
2. (Sweden) Johan Brunström / (Denmark) Frederik Nielsen (champions)
3. (France) Nicolas Mahut / (Croatia) Lovro Zovko (final)
4. (Spain) Adrián Menéndez / (Sweden) Andreas Siljeström (semifinals)

== Draw ==
Key

- Q = Qualifier
- WC = Wild card
- LL = Lucky loser
- Alt = Alternate
- ITF = ITF entry
- PR = Protected ranking
- SR = Special ranking
- SE = Special exempt
- JE = Junior exempt
- JR = Junior Accelerator Programme entrant
- CO = College Accelerator Programme entrant
- NG = Next Gen Accelerator Program entrant
- w/o = Walkover
- r = Retired
- d = Defaulted

=== Draw ===
First round

Quarterfinals

Semifinals

Final

1
- (United Kingdom) J Delgado
- (United Kingdom) J Marray
4
4

- (Spain) R Bautista Agut
- (Spain) I Navarro
6
6

- (Spain) R Bautista Agut
- (Spain) I Navarro
7^{7}
6

- (Russia) T Gabashvili
- (Kazakhstan) M Kukushkin
7^{10}
6

- (Russia) T Gabashvili
- (Kazakhstan) M Kukushkin
6^{3}
4

(Spain) Guillermo Gómez-Diaz
(Spain) Mikey Suleau
6^{8}
3

- (Spain) R Bautista Agut
- (Spain) I Navarro
3
6^{0}

3
- (France) N Mahut
- (Croatia) L Zovko
6
6

3
- (France) N Mahut
- (Croatia) L Zovko
6
7^{7}

WC
(Spain) Rubén Hernándo-Ruano
(Romania) Christian Voinea
1
1

3
- (France) N Mahut
- (Croatia) L Zovko
7^{7}
4
[10]

- (France) K de Schepper
- (France) F Martin
7
4
[4]

- (Spain) P Carreño Busta
- (Spain) G Granollers
6^{2}
6
[5]

- (Spain) P Carreño Busta
- (Spain) G Granollers
5
6
[10]

3
- (France) N Mahut
- (Croatia) L Zovko
2
6
[6]

WC
(Spain) M Fornell-Mestres
(Spain) Mario Muniesa
6^{1}
3

2
- (Sweden) J Brunström
- (Denmark) F Nielsen
6
3
[10]

- (Spain) Alejandro Andino
- (Bolivia) F Zeballos
7^{7}
6

- (Spain) Alejandro Andino
- (Bolivia) F Zeballos
3
0

- (Slovakia) K Beck
- (United Kingdom) K Skupski
6^{0}
6
[7]

4
- (Spain) A Menéndez
- (Sweden) A Siljeström
6
6

4
- (Spain) A Menéndez
- (Sweden) A Siljeström
7^{7}
4
[10]

4
- (Spain) A Menéndez
- (Sweden) A Siljeström
3
4

- (Belgium) R Bemelmans
- (Netherlands) I Sijsling
6
6

2
- (Sweden) J Brunström
- (Denmark) F Nielsen
6
6

WC
(Spain) Roberto Ortega Olmedo
(Spain) Jaime Pulgar-García
3
0

- (Belgium) R Bemelmans
- (Netherlands) I Sijsling
3
2

- (France) V Millot
- (France) A Olivetti
4
4

2
- (Sweden) J Brunström
- (Denmark) F Nielsen
6
6

2
- (Sweden) J Brunström
- (Denmark) F Nielsen
6
6
