= 2024 Open Castilla y León – Doubles =

Doubles
- 2024 Open Castilla y León

Final
- Champions: (France) Dan Added (France) Arthur Reymond
- Runners-up: (Bulgaria) Alexander Donski (Portugal) Tiago Pereira
- Score: 6–4, 6–3

Events
Singles	Doubles
- Open Castilla y León

Dan Added and Pierre-Hugues Herbert were the defending champions but only Added chose to defend his title, partnering Arthur Reymond. He successfully defended his title after defeating Alexander Donski and Tiago Pereira 6–4, 6–3 in the final.

== Seeds ==
1. (Zimbabwe) Benjamin Lock / (Zimbabwe) Courtney John Lock (quarterfinals, withdrew)
2. (Belgium) Michael Geerts / (Austria) Neil Oberleitner (quarterfinals, withdrew)
3. (Bulgaria) Alexander Donski / (Portugal) Tiago Pereira (final)
4. (Uzbekistan) Denis Istomin / Evgeny Karlovskiy (quarterfinals)

== Draw ==
Key

- Q = Qualifier
- WC = Wild card
- LL = Lucky loser
- Alt = Alternate
- ITF = ITF entry
- PR = Protected ranking
- SR = Special ranking
- SE = Special exempt
- JE = Junior exempt
- JR = Junior Accelerator Programme entrant
- CO = College Accelerator Programme entrant
- NG = Next Gen Accelerator Program entrant
- w/o = Walkover
- r = Retired
- d = Defaulted

=== Draw ===
First round
1	(Zimbabwe) B Lock (Zimbabwe) CJ Lock	6	6
WC	(Spain) Daniel Arranz Rebollo (Spain) Pablo Peláez Marin	2	0
WC	(Spain) Àlex Martínez (Spain) I Montes de la Torre	6	6
(Italy) Simone Agostini (China) J Cui	3	3
4	(Uzbekistan) D Istomin; E Karlovskiy	6	6
(France) R Bertrand (Spain) John Echeverría	4	2
(France) D Added (France) A Reymond	6	3	[10]
Alt	Y Demin (Bulgaria) I Radulov	2	6	[6]
(Spain) N Álvarez Varona (Spain) A Barroso Campos	3	6	[5]
(Spain) Iván Marrero Curbelo (Spain) A Sánchez Quílez	6	3	[10]
(Italy) Fabrizio Andaloro (Italy) L Rottoli	0^{r}
3	(Bulgaria) A Donski (Portugal) T Pereira	5
Alt	(Ecuador) P Alvarado (Argentina) Lorenzo Joaquín Rodríguez	6^{4}	6	[10]
(Bulgaria) G Donev (Bulgaria) Simon Anthony Ivanov	7^{7}	4	[8]

Quarterfinals
1	(Zimbabwe) B Lock (Zimbabwe) CJ Lock
WC	(Spain) À Martínez (Spain) I Montes de la Torre	w/o
4	(Uzbekistan) D Istomin; E Karlovskiy	3	7^{7}	[7]
(France) D Added (France) A Reymond	6	6^{0}	[10]
(Spain) I Marrero Curbelo (Spain) A Sánchez Quílez	4	1
3	(Bulgaria) A Donski (Portugal) T Pereira	6	6
Alt	(Ecuador) P Alvarado (Argentina) LJ Rodríguez	w/o
2	(Belgium) M Geerts (Austria) N Oberleitner

Semifinals
WC	(Spain) À Martínez (Spain) I Montes de la Torre	4	2
(France) D Added (France) A Reymond	6	6
3	(Bulgaria) A Donski (Portugal) T Pereira	w/o
Alt	(Ecuador) P Alvarado (Argentina) LJ Rodríguez

Final
(France) D Added (France) A Reymond	6	6
3	(Bulgaria) A Donski (Portugal) T Pereira	4	3
