= 2024 Open Castilla y León – Singles =

Singles
- 2024 Open Castilla y León

Final
- Champion: (France) Antoine Escoffier
- Runner-up: (Spain) Àlex Martínez
- Score: 6–3, 2–6, 6–3

Events
Singles	Doubles
- Open Castilla y León

Pablo Llamas Ruiz was the defending champion but chose not to defend his title.

Antoine Escoffier won the title after defeating Àlex Martínez 6–3, 2–6, 6–3 in the final. At 32 years and four months, Escoffier was the second-oldest first-time winner in Challenger history behind only Joseph Sirianni, who won a title in 2007 at 32 years and ten months.

== Seeds ==
1. (France) Antoine Escoffier (champion)
2. (France) Jules Marie (first round)
3. Alibek Kachmazov (second round)
4. Egor Gerasimov (second round)
5. (France) Robin Bertrand (first round)
6. (Belgium) Michael Geerts (second round)
7. (Denmark) August Holmgren (first round)
8. (Ukraine) Vadym Ursu (first round)

== Draw ==
Key

- Q = Qualifier
- WC = Wild card
- LL = Lucky loser
- Alt = Alternate
- ITF = ITF entry
- PR = Protected ranking
- SR = Special ranking
- SE = Special exempt
- JE = Junior exempt
- JR = Junior Accelerator Programme entrant
- CO = College Accelerator Programme entrant
- NG = Next Gen Accelerator Program entrant
- w/o = Walkover
- r = Retired
- d = Defaulted

=== Finals ===
Semifinals
1	(France) Antoine Escoffier	6	6
(China) Cui Jie	4	4
WC	(Spain) Nicolás Álvarez Varona	4	3
Q	(Spain) Àlex Martínez	6	6

Final
1	(France) Antoine Escoffier	6	2	6
Q	(Spain) Àlex Martínez	3	6	3

=== Top half ===
First round
1	(France) A Escoffier	7^{7}	6
(Bulgaria) I Radulov	6^{2}	1
(Spain) A Barroso Campos	5	5
(Lithuania) E Butvilas	7	7
(France) Alexis Gautier	6	6^{2}	2
(Spain) M Damas	4	7^{7}	6
(Zimbabwe) B Lock	6	6
8	(Ukraine) Vadym Ursu	3	1
3	A Kachmazov	3	7	6
Alt	(Spain) I Montes de la Torre	6	5	1
Q	(Germany) M Wiskandt	6	6
E Karlovskiy	1	4
(Spain) D Mérida	4	4
(France) A Weber	6	6
(China) J Cui	7	6
5	(France) R Bertrand	5	2

Second round
1	(France) A Escoffier	w/o
(Lithuania) E Butvilas
(Spain) M Damas	7^{7}	5	6^{5}
(Zimbabwe) B Lock	6^{2}	7	7^{7}
3	A Kachmazov	6	2	3
Q	(Germany) M Wiskandt	2	6	6
(France) A Weber	4	6	6^{0}
(China) J Cui	6	4	7^{7}

Quarterfinals
1	(France) A Escoffier	6	6
(Zimbabwe) B Lock	2	2
Q	(Germany) M Wiskandt	4	5
(China) J Cui	6	7

Semifinals
1	(France) A Escoffier	6	6
(China) J Cui	4	4

=== Bottom half ===
First round
6	(Belgium) M Geerts	6	7^{7}
(France) L Lokoli	4	6^{4}
Q	(Colombia) A Soriano Barrera	6^{5}	4
(France) D Added	7^{7}	6
WC	(Spain) A Sánchez Quílez	1	1
WC	(Spain) N Álvarez Varona	6	6
Q	(Italy) Fabrizio Andaloro	4	3
4	E Gerasimov	6	6
7	(Denmark) A Holmgren	5	4
Q	(Spain) John Echeverría	7	6
Q	(Spain) Iván Marrero Curbelo	6	6^{4}	3
Q	(Spain) Àlex Martínez	3	7^{7}	6
WC	(Spain) Mario González Fernández	6	6
(Argentina) Lorenzo Joaquín Rodríguez	4	3
(Egypt) M Safwat	7^{7}	6
2	(France) Jules Marie	6^{2}	4

Second round
6	(Belgium) M Geerts	3	6	3
(France) D Added	6	3	6
WC	(Spain) N Álvarez Varona	6	6^{7}	6
4	E Gerasimov	4	7^{9}	3
Q	(Spain) J Echeverría	6	4	4
Q	(Spain) À Martínez	1	6	6
WC	(Spain) M González Fernández	w/o
(Egypt) M Safwat

Quarterfinals
(France) D Added	3	3
WC	(Spain) N Álvarez Varona	6	6
Q	(Spain) À Martínez	6	2	6
WC	(Spain) M González Fernández	3	6	3

Semifinals
WC	(Spain) N Álvarez Varona	4	3
Q	(Spain) À Martínez	6	6
