= 2009 Open Castilla y León – Doubles =

Doubles
- 2009 Open Castilla y León

Final
- Champions: (France) Nicolas Mahut; (France) Édouard Roger-Vasselin
- Runners-up: (Ukraine) Sergiy Stakhovsky; (Croatia) Lovro Zovko
- Score: 6–7(4), 6–3, [10–8]

Events
Singles	Doubles
- Open Castilla y León

Ross Hutchins and Jim Thomas were the defending champions, but they chose to not compete this year.
Nicolas Mahut and Édouard Roger-Vasselin defeated Sergiy Stakhovsky and Lovro Zovko 6–7(4), 6–3, [10–8] in the final.

== Seeds ==
1. (Germany) Michael Kohlmann / (Netherlands) Rogier Wassen (quarterfinals)
2. (Ukraine) Sergiy Stakhovsky / (Croatia) Lovro Zovko (final)
3. (United Kingdom) James Auckland / (United Kingdom) Jamie Murray (semifinals)
4. (Switzerland) George Bastl / (France) Olivier Charroin (first round)

== Draw ==
Key

- Q = Qualifier
- WC = Wild card
- LL = Lucky loser
- Alt = Alternate
- ITF = ITF entry
- PR = Protected ranking
- SR = Special ranking
- SE = Special exempt
- JE = Junior exempt
- JR = Junior Accelerator Programme entrant
- CO = College Accelerator Programme entrant
- NG = Next Gen Accelerator Program entrant
- w/o = Walkover
- r = Retired
- d = Defaulted

=== Draw ===
First round

Quarterfinals

Semifinals

Finals

1
- (Germany) M Kohlmann
- (Netherlands) R Wassen
6
6^{4}
[12]

WC
- (Spain) F Clavet
- (Spain) F López
1
7
[10]

1
- (Germany) M Kohlmann
- (Netherlands) R Wassen
3
0

WC
(Spain) J Hernando Ruano
(Romania) C Voinea
1
0

- (France) N Mahut
- (France) É Roger-Vasselin
6
6

- (France) N Mahut
- (France) É Roger-Vasselin
6
6

- (France) N Mahut
- (France) É Roger-Vasselin
6
6^{5}
[10]

3
- (United Kingdom) J Auckland
- (United Kingdom) J Marray
6
7

3
- (United Kingdom) J Auckland
- (United Kingdom) J Marray
2
7
[6]

- (Spain) I Navarro
- (Spain) F Vicente
3
5

3
- (United Kingdom) J Auckland
- (United Kingdom) J Marray
6
6

- (Slovenia) B Kavčič
- (Slovenia) G Žemlja
6
7

- (Slovenia) B Kavčič
- (Slovenia) G Žemlja
3
2

- (Czech Republic) J Krkoška
- (Slovakia) L Lacko
3
6^{2}

- (France) N Mahut
- (France) É Roger-Vasselin
6^{4}
6
[10]

- (Croatia) R Karanušić
- (France) A Sidorenko
6
6

2
- (Ukraine) S Stakhovsky
- (Croatia) L Zovko
7
3
[8]

- (Spain) P Martín-Adalia
- (Spain) A Ramos Viñolas
3
3

- (Croatia) R Karanušić
- (France) A Sidorenko
1
2

- (Italy) R Ghedin
- (Kazakhstan) M Kukushkin
7
4
[10]

- (Italy) R Ghedin
- (Kazakhstan) M Kukushkin
6
6

4
(Switzerland) G Bastl
(France) O Charroin
6^{6}
6
[6]

- (Italy) R Ghedin
- (Kazakhstan) M Kukushkin
6^{0}
2

WC
- (Argentina) F Delbonis
- (Spain) Q Muñoz
2
1

2
- (Ukraine) S Stakhovsky
- (Croatia) L Zovko
7
6

- (Spain) M Granollers
- (Algeria) L Ouahab
6
6

- (Spain) M Granollers
- (Algeria) L Ouahab
5
3

- (Germany) D Kindlmann
- (Germany) J Reister
2
3

2
- (Ukraine) S Stakhovsky
- (Croatia) L Zovko
7
6

2
- (Ukraine) S Stakhovsky
- (Croatia) L Zovko
6
6
