= 2022 Open Castilla y León – Doubles =

Doubles
- 2022 Open Castilla y León

Final
- Champions: (Spain) Nicolás Álvarez Varona (Spain) Iñaki Montes de la Torre
- Runners-up: (Zimbabwe) Benjamin Lock (Zimbabwe) Courtney John Lock
- Score: 7–6^{(7–3)}, 6–3

Events
Singles	Doubles
- Open Castilla y León

Robert Galloway and Alex Lawson were the defending champions but chose not to defend their title.

Nicolás Álvarez Varona and Iñaki Montes de la Torre won the title after defeating Benjamin and Courtney John Lock 7–6^{(7–3)}, 6–3 in the final.

== Seeds ==
1. (India) Arjun Kadhe / (Poland) Piotr Matuszewski (quarterfinals)
2. (Switzerland) Luca Margaroli / (Spain) Adrián Menéndez Maceiras (quarterfinals)
3. (Bolivia) Boris Arias / (Bolivia) Federico Zeballos (first round)
4. (France) Théo Arribagé / (France) Luca Sanchez (quarterfinals)

== Draw ==
Key

- Q = Qualifier
- WC = Wild card
- LL = Lucky loser
- Alt = Alternate
- ITF = ITF entry
- PR = Protected ranking
- SR = Special ranking
- SE = Special exempt
- JE = Junior exempt
- JR = Junior Accelerator Programme entrant
- CO = College Accelerator Programme entrant
- NG = Next Gen Accelerator Program entrant
- w/o = Walkover
- r = Retired
- d = Defaulted

First round
1	(India) A Kadhe (Poland) P Matuszewski	6	7^{8}
WC	(Australia) A Taylor (Australia) J Taylor	3	6^{6}
E Donskoy; A Kuznetsov
(Spain) John Echeverría (Spain) A Moro Cañas	w/o
3	(Bolivia) B Arias (Bolivia) F Zeballos	3	3
(Moldova) A Cozbinov (Uzbekistan) D Istomin	6	6
(Republic of Ireland) S Carr (Czech Republic) D Palán	3	7^{7}	[6]
(Spain) Í Cervantes (Spain) O Roca Batalla	6	6^{2}	[10]
(Spain) N Álvarez Varona (Spain) I Montes de la Torre	6	6
WC	(United States) Jack Vance (United States) Jamie Vance	0	4
Yan Bondarevskiy (Spain) C Sánchez Jover	4	3
2	(Switzerland) L Margaroli (Spain) A Menéndez Maceiras	6	6

Quarterfinals
1	(India) A Kadhe (Poland) P Matuszewski	2	6^{5}
(Spain) J Echeverría (Spain) A Moro Cañas	6	7^{7}
(Moldova) A Cozbinov (Uzbekistan) D Istomin	6	4	[6]
(Zimbabwe) B Lock (Zimbabwe) CJ Lock	4	6	[10]
(Spain) Í Cervantes (Spain) O Roca Batalla	4	7	[10]
4	(France) T Arribagé (France) L Sanchez	6	5	[3]
(Spain) N Álvarez Varona (Spain) I Montes de la Torre	6	6
2	(Switzerland) L Margaroli (Spain) A Menéndez Maceiras	4	4

Semifinals
(Spain) J Echeverría (Spain) A Moro Cañas	5	7	[7]
(Zimbabwe) B Lock (Zimbabwe) CJ Lock	7	5	[10]
(Spain) Í Cervantes (Spain) O Roca Batalla	4	4
(Spain) N Álvarez Varona (Spain) I Montes de la Torre	6	6

Final
(Zimbabwe) B Lock (Zimbabwe) CJ Lock	6^{3}	3
(Spain) N Álvarez Varona (Spain) I Montes de la Torre	7^{7}	6
