= 2009 Open Castilla y León – Singles =

Singles
- 2009 Open Castilla y León

Final
- Champion: (Spain) Feliciano López
- Runner-up: (France) Adrian Mannarino
- Score: 6–3, 6–4

Events
Singles	Doubles
- Open Castilla y León

Sergiy Stakhovsky was the defending champion but was eliminated by Édouard Roger-Vasselin in the second round. Feliciano López won in the final 6–3, 6–4, against Adrian Mannarino.

== Seeds ==
1. (Spain) Feliciano López (champion)
2. (Russia) Evgeny Korolev (second round)
3. (Ukraine) Sergiy Stakhovsky (second round)
4. (Spain) Marcel Granollers (semifinals)
5. (France) Adrian Mannarino (final)
6. (Spain) Iván Navarro (quarterfinals)
7. (Croatia) Roko Karanušić (second round)
8. (Slovenia) Blaž Kavčič (first round)

== Draw ==
Key

- Q = Qualifier
- WC = Wild card
- LL = Lucky loser
- Alt = Alternate
- ITF = ITF entry
- PR = Protected ranking
- SR = Special ranking
- SE = Special exempt
- JE = Junior exempt
- JR = Junior Accelerator Programme entrant
- CO = College Accelerator Programme entrant
- NG = Next Gen Accelerator Program entrant
- w/o = Walkover
- r = Retired
- d = Defaulted

=== Final four ===
Semifinals
1/WC	(Spain) Feliciano López	4	7	7
(France) Nicolas Mahut	6	6^{5}	6^{4}
4	(Spain) Marcel Granollers	6^{5}	3
5	(France) Adrian Mannarino	7	6

Final
1/WC	(Spain) Feliciano López	6	6
5	(France) Adrian Mannarino	3	4

=== Top half ===
First round
1/WC	(Spain) F López	6	7
(Switzerland) S Bohli	4	6^{7}
SE	(Spain) I Cervantes Huegun	4	2
SE	(Ukraine) I Marchenko	6	6
(France) A Sidorenko	7	4	6
(Italy) R Ghedin	6^{2}	6	2
WC	(Spain) J Hernando Ruano	4	4
6	(Spain) I Navarro	6	6
3	(Ukraine) S Stakhovsky	6	6
WC	(Spain) Q Muñoz	2	2
(France) É Roger-Vasselin	7	7
(Slovakia) L Lacko	6^{6}	6^{4}
(Germany) B Dorsch	0	1
(Algeria) L Ouahab	6	6
(France) N Mahut	7	7
8	(Slovenia) B Kavčič	6^{4}	6^{4}

Second round
1/WC	(Spain) F López	7	6
SE	(Ukraine) I Marchenko	6^{4}	4
(France) A Sidorenko	6^{1}	2
6	(Spain) I Navarro	7	6
3	(Ukraine) S Stakhovsky	3	6	1
(France) É Roger-Vasselin	6	3	6
(Algeria) L Ouahab	6^{4}	4
(France) N Mahut	7	6

Quarterfinals
1/WC	(Spain) F López	6	6
6	(Spain) I Navarro	3	2
(France) É Roger-Vasselin	2	5
(France) N Mahut	6	7

Semifinals
1/WC	(Spain) F López	4	7	7
(France) N Mahut	6	6^{5}	6^{4}

=== Bottom half ===
First round
7	(Croatia) R Karanušić	6	6
(Slovenia) G Žemlja	2	2
(Netherlands) J Huta Galung	5	6	6^{4}
Q	(Bulgaria) G Dimitrov	7	4	7
Q	(France) J-N Insausti	7	6
Q	(Spain) S Gutiérrez Ferrol	6^{5}	2
(Germany) D Kindlmann	5	6	3
4	(Spain) M Granollers	7	4	6
5	(France) A Mannarino	2	7	6
(Germany) J Reister	6	6^{6}	3
(Kazakhstan) M Kukushkin	3	2
(Austria) S Koubek	6	6
WC	(Spain) R Bautista Agut	6	7
Q	(Spain) F Vicente	1	5
(Austria) M Fischer	4	6	6^{5}
2	(Russia) E Korolev	6	2	7

Second round
7	(Croatia) R Karanušić	3	2
Q	(Bulgaria) G Dimitrov	6	6
Q	(France) J-N Insausti	4	6^{3}
4	(Spain) M Granollers	6	7
5	(France) A Mannarino	6	6
(Austria) S Koubek	1	2
WC	(Spain) R Bautista Agut	7	6
2	(Russia) E Korolev	6^{4}	3

Quarterfinals
Q	(Bulgaria) G Dimitrov	4	6	5
4	(Spain) M Granollers	6	2	7
5	(France) A Mannarino	7	6
WC	(Spain) R Bautista Agut	5	1

Semifinals
4	(Spain) M Granollers	6^{5}	3
5	(France) A Mannarino	7	6
