= 2014 Open Castilla y León – Singles =

Singles
- 2014 Open Castilla y León

Final
- Champions: (France) Adrian Mannarino
- Runners-up: (Spain) Adrián Menéndez-Maceiras
- Score: 6–3, 6–0

Events
Singles	Doubles
← 2013 ·	Open Castilla y León	· 2015 →

Adrian Mannarino took the title, defeating Adrián Menéndez-Maceiras 6–3, 6–0

== Seeds ==
1. (France) Adrian Mannarino (champion)
2. (Russia) Alexander Kudryavtsev (semifinals)
3. (Turkey) Marsel İlhan (first round)
4. (France) Grégoire Burquier (first round)
5. (Switzerland) Marco Chiudinelli (semifinals)
6. (Russia) Konstantin Kravchuk (first round)
7. (Serbia) Ilija Bozoljac (second round)
8. (Spain) Adrián Menéndez-Maceiras (final)

== Draw ==
=== Key ===
- Q = Qualifier
- WC = Wild card
- LL = Lucky loser
- Alt = Alternate
- SE = Special exempt
- PR = Protected ranking
- ITF = ITF entry
- JE = Junior exempt
- w/o = Walkover
- r = Retired
- d = Defaulted
- SR = Special ranking

=== Finals ===
Semifinals
1	(France) Adrian Mannarino	6	6
5	(Switzerland) Marco Chiudinelli	1	2
8	(Spain) Adrián Menéndez-Maceiras	7^{7}	6
2	(Russia) Alexander Kudryavtsev	6^{4}	0

Final
1	(France) Adrian Mannarino	6	6
8	(Spain) Adrián Menéndez-Maceiras	3	0

=== Top half ===
First round
1	(France) A Mannarino	6	6
(Greece) T Angelinos	3	2
Q	(Portugal) F Ferreira Silva	7^{9}	6
(France) Julien Obry	6^{7}	4
WC	(Spain) Jorge Hernando Ruano	6	3	2
Q	(United Kingdom) B Klein	3	6	6
(Spain) D Muñoz de la Nava	6	4	6^{3}
7	(Serbia) I Bozoljac	3	6	7^{7}
4	(France) G Burquier	6	4	4
(India) J Nedunchezhiyan	4	6	6
Q	(China) C Wang	1	7	4
(Spain) G Granollers	6	5	6
WC	(Spain) Antonio Cembellin	7^{8}	7^{8}
WC	(Spain) Alejandro Augusto Bueno	6^{6}	6^{6}
(United Kingdom) M Willis	6^{2}	0
5	(Switzerland) M Chiudinelli	7^{7}	6

Second round
1	(France) A Mannarino	3	6	6
Q	(Portugal) F Ferreira Silva	6	4	2
Q	(United Kingdom) B Klein	7^{7}	6
7	(Serbia) I Bozoljac	6^{5}	2
(India) J Nedunchezhiyan	6	3	2
(Spain) G Granollers	1	6	6
WC	(Spain) A Cembellin	2	3
5	(Switzerland) M Chiudinelli	6	6

Quarterfinals
1	(France) A Mannarino	6	7^{8}
Q	(United Kingdom) B Klein	2	6^{6}
(Spain) G Granollers	3	6^{4}
5	(Switzerland) M Chiudinelli	6	7^{7}

Semifinals
1	(France) A Mannarino	6	6
5	(Switzerland) M Chiudinelli	1	2

=== Bottom half ===
First round
8	(Spain) A Menéndez-Maceiras	6	7
(United Kingdom) D Cox	1	5
(Belgium) Y Mertens	6	6
(Monaco) B Balleret	4	2
(United Kingdom) D Rice	3	4
(United Kingdom) K Edmund	6	6
(Spain) R Ortega Olmedo	0	6	7^{7}
3	(Turkey) M İlhan	6	3	6^{5}
6	(Russia) K Kravchuk	3	6^{4}
(Croatia) N Mektić	6	7^{7}
(Spain) E López-Pérez	3	3
Q	(France) F Serra	6	6
(France) M Vaïsse	3	6	1
WC	(Chile) C Garin	6	4	6
(Netherlands) A van der Duim	4	2
2	(Russia) A Kudryavtsev	6	6

Second round
8	(Spain) A Menéndez-Maceiras	4	6	7^{7}
(Belgium) Y Mertens	6	0	6^{5}
(United Kingdom) K Edmund	6	6
(Spain) R Ortega Olmedo	2	2
(Croatia) N Mektić	4	2
Q	(France) F Serra	6	6
WC	(Chile) C Garin	1	3
2	(Russia) A Kudryavtsev	6	6

Quarterfinals
8	(Spain) A Menéndez-Maceiras	4	6	7^{7}
(United Kingdom) K Edmund	6	4	6^{4}
Q	(France) F Serra	4	4
2	(Russia) A Kudryavtsev	6	6

Semifinals
8	(Spain) A Menéndez-Maceiras	7^{7}	6
2	(Russia) A Kudryavtsev	6^{4}	0
