= 2014 Open Castilla y León – Doubles =

Doubles
- 2014 Open Castilla y León

Final
- Champions: (Russia) Victor Baluda (Russia) Alexander Kudryavtsev
- Runners-up: (United Kingdom) Brydan Klein (Croatia) Nikola Mektić
- Score: 6–2, 4–6, [10–3]

Events
Singles	Doubles
← 2013 ·	Open Castilla y León	· 2015 →

Victor Baluda and Alexander Kudryavtsev took the title, beating Brydan Klein and Nikola Mektić 6–2, 4–6, [10–3]

== Seeds ==
1. (China) Gong Maoxin / (Chinese Taipei) Peng Hsien-yin (first round)
2. (Republic of Ireland) James Cluskey / (Spain) Adrián Menéndez-Maceiras (first round)
3. (Venezuela) Roberto Maytín / (Mexico) Miguel Ángel Reyes-Varela (first round)
4. (Serbia) Ilija Bozoljac / (Serbia) Goran Tošić (semifinals)

== Draw ==
=== Key ===
- Q = Qualifier
- WC = Wild card
- LL = Lucky loser
- Alt = Alternate
- SE = Special exempt
- PR = Protected ranking
- ITF = ITF entry
- JE = Junior exempt
- w/o = Walkover
- r = Retired
- d = Defaulted
- SR = Special ranking

=== Draw ===
First round
1	(China) G Maoxin (Chinese Taipei) H-y Peng	4	6^{6}
(Spain) Ivan Arenas-Gualda (Spain) E López-Pérez	6	7^{8}
(Monaco) B Balleret (France) H Nys	6^{9}	4
(United Kingdom) D Cox (United Kingdom) D Rice	7^{11}	6
3	(Venezuela) R Maytín (Mexico) MÁ Reyes-Varela	5	7	[9]
(Russia) V Baluda (Russia) A Kudryavtsev	7	5	[11]
WC	(Spain) Mario Muniesa (Spain) Pablo Munoz Carabias	1	0
WC	(Spain) G Granollers (Spain) Miguel Semmler	6	6
WC	(Spain) Jose-Esteban Blanco-Criador (Spain) Jorge Hernando Ruano	7^{8}	6^{2}	[10]
(India) J Nedunchezhiyan (Netherlands) A van der Duim	6^{6}	7^{7}	[2]
(Spain) R Ortega-Olmedo (Spain) Jaime Pulgar-Garcia	4	6	[7]
4	(Serbia) I Bozoljac (Serbia) G Tošic	6	3	[10]
(United Kingdom) L Burton (United Kingdom) M Willis	6	6
(Puerto Rico) A Llompart (South Africa) D O'Brien	4	4
(United Kingdom) B Klein (Croatia) N Mektić	6	7^{7}
2	(Republic of Ireland) J Cluskey (Spain) A Menéndez-Maceiras	4	6^{3}

Quarterfinals
(Spain) I Arenas-Gualda (Spain) E López-Pérez	7^{7}	7^{7}
(United Kingdom) D Cox (United Kingdom) D Rice	6^{4}	6^{4}
(Russia) V Baluda (Russia) A Kudryavtsev	7^{7}	6
WC	(Spain) G Granollers (Spain) M Semmler	6^{2}	3
WC	(Spain) J-E Blanco-Criador (Spain) J Hernando Ruano	2	2
4	(Serbia) I Bozoljac (Serbia) G Tošic	6	6
(United Kingdom) L Burton (United Kingdom) M Willis	5	6	[6]
(United Kingdom) B Klein (Croatia) N Mektić	7	3	[10]

Semifinals
(Spain) I Arenas-Gualda (Spain) E López-Pérez	3	3
(Russia) V Baluda (Russia) A Kudryavtsev	6	6
4	(Serbia) I Bozoljac (Serbia) G Tošic	6	4	[1]
(United Kingdom) B Klein (Croatia) N Mektić	2	6	[10]

Final
(Russia) V Baluda (Russia) A Kudryavtsev	6	4	[10]
(United Kingdom) B Klein (Croatia) N Mektić	2	6	[3]
