= 2009 Open Castilla y León =

- Date: August 3–9
- Edition: 24th
- Surface: Hard
- Location: Segovia, Spain

Champions

Singles
- (Spain) Feliciano López

Doubles
- (France) Nicolas Mahut / (France) Édouard Roger-Vasselin
- Open Castilla y León

The 2009 Open Castilla y León was a professional tennis tournament played on outdoor hard courts. It was the twenty fourth edition of the tournament which was part of the Tretorn SERIE+ of the 2009 ATP Challenger Tour. It took place in Segovia, Spain between 3 and 9 August 2009.

== Singles entrants ==
=== Seeds ===
Nationality	Player	Ranking*	Seeding
ESP	Feliciano López	39	1
RUS	Evgeny Korolev	90	2
UKR	Sergiy Stakhovsky	92	3
ESP	Marcel Granollers	99	4
FRA	Adrian Mannarino	108	5
ESP	Iván Navarro	116	6
CRO	Roko Karanušić	123	7
SLO	Blaž Kavčič	135	8

- Rankings are as of July 27, 2009.

=== Other entrants ===
The following players received wildcards into the singles main draw:

- (Spain) Roberto Bautista Agut
- (Spain) Jorge Hernando Ruano
- (Spain) Feliciano López
- (Spain) Quino Muñoz

The following players received a Special Exempt into the main draw:

- (Spain) Íñigo Cervantes Huegun
- (Ukraine) Illya Marchenko

The following players received entry from the qualifying draw:

- (Bulgaria) Grigor Dimitrov
- (Spain) Sergio Gutiérrez Ferrol
- (France) Jean-Noel Insausti
- (Spain) Fernando Vicente

== Champions ==
=== Singles ===
(Spain) Feliciano López def. (France) Adrian Mannarino, 6–3, 6–4

=== Doubles ===
(France) Nicolas Mahut / (France) Édouard Roger-Vasselin def. (Ukraine) Sergiy Stakhovsky / (Croatia) Lovro Zovko, 6–7(4), 6–3, [10–8]
