= 2017 Open Castilla y León – Men's doubles =

Men's doubles
- 2017 Open Castilla y León

Final
- Champions: (Spain) Adrián Menéndez-Maceiras (Ukraine) Sergiy Stakhovsky
- Runners-up: (Spain) Roberto Ortega Olmedo (Spain) David Vega Hernández
- Score: 4–6, 6–3, [10–7]

Events
Singles	men	women
Doubles	men	women
- Open Castilla y León

Purav Raja and Divij Sharan were the defending champions but chose not to defend their title.

Adrián Menéndez-Maceiras and Sergiy Stakhovsky won the title after defeating Roberto Ortega Olmedo and David Vega Hernández 4–6, 6–3, [10–7] in the final.

== Seeds ==
1. (Australia) Steven de Waard / (Japan) Ben McLachlan (first round)
2. (Turkey) Tuna Altuna / (Portugal) Gonçalo Oliveira (first round)
3. (Spain) Adrián Menéndez-Maceiras / (Ukraine) Sergiy Stakhovsky (champions)
4. (Spain) Gerard Granollers / (Spain) Marcel Granollers (semifinals)

== Draw ==
Key

- Q = Qualifier
- WC = Wild card
- LL = Lucky loser
- Alt = Alternate
- ITF = ITF entry
- PR = Protected ranking
- SR = Special ranking
- SE = Special exempt
- JE = Junior exempt
- JR = Junior Accelerator Programme entrant
- CO = College Accelerator Programme entrant
- NG = Next Gen Accelerator Program entrant
- w/o = Walkover
- r = Retired
- d = Defaulted

First round
1	(Australia) S de Waard (Japan) B McLachlan	6^{6}	2
(United Kingdom) S Clayton (United Kingdom) J O'Mara	7^{8}	6
(Chile) C Garin (Spain) S Martos Gornés	2	6	[12]
WC	(Spain) P Martínez (Spain) J Munar	6	4	[10]
3	(Spain) A Menéndez-Maceiras (Ukraine) S Stakhovsky	7^{9}	6^{4}	[10]
(Switzerland) M Chiudinelli (Bosnia and Herzegovina) A Šetkić	6^{7}	7^{7}	[8]
(Brazil) A Ghem (Belgium) Y Mertens	6	6
WC	(Spain) Jaime Fermosell Delgado (Spain) C Taberner	3	1
(France) B Bonzi (France) A Olivetti	6	7^{7}
(Australia) A De Minaur (Spain) B Zapata Miralles	3	6^{4}
WC	(Canada) S Diez (Spain) Bruno Mardones	3	4
4	(Spain) G Granollers (Spain) M Granollers	6	6
(Belarus) E Gerasimov (Belarus) I Ivashka	6	4	[10]
(Italy) M Berrettini (Italy) F Cipolla	3	6	[6]
(Spain) R Ortega Olmedo (Spain) D Vega Hernández	6	6
2	(Turkey) T Altuna (Portugal) G Oliveira	2	4

Quarterfinals
(United Kingdom) S Clayton (United Kingdom) J O'Mara	6	1	[10]
(Chile) C Garin (Spain) S Martos Gornés	4	6	[6]
3	(Spain) A Menéndez-Maceiras (Ukraine) S Stakhovsky	6	6
(Brazil) A Ghem (Belgium) Y Mertens	3	1
(France) B Bonzi (France) A Olivetti	6	5	[5]
4	(Spain) G Granollers (Spain) M Granollers	4	7	[10]
(Belarus) E Gerasimov (Belarus) I Ivashka	6^{5}	6	[4]
(Spain) R Ortega Olmedo (Spain) D Vega Hernández	7^{7}	3	[10]

Semifinals
(United Kingdom) S Clayton (United Kingdom) J O'Mara	1	4
3	(Spain) A Menéndez-Maceiras (Ukraine) S Stakhovsky	6	6
4	(Spain) G Granollers (Spain) M Granollers	6^{1}	3
(Spain) R Ortega Olmedo (Spain) D Vega Hernández	7^{7}	6

Final
3	(Spain) A Menéndez-Maceiras (Ukraine) S Stakhovsky	4	6	[10]
(Spain) R Ortega Olmedo (Spain) D Vega Hernández	6	3	[7]
