= 2025 Open Castilla y León =

- Date: 21 – 27 July
- Edition: 39th
- Surface: Hard
- Location: Segovia, Spain

Champions

Singles
- (United Kingdom) George Loffhagen

Doubles
- (Chile) Matías Soto / (Bolivia) Federico Zeballos
- Open Castilla y León

The 2025 Open Castilla y León Villa de El Espinar was a professional tennis tournament played on outdoor hard courts. It was the 39th edition of the tournament and part of the 2025 ATP Challenger Tour. It took place in El Espinar, Segovia, Spain, between 21 and 27 July 2025.

== Singles main draw entrants ==
=== Seeds ===
| Country | Player | Rank^{1} | Seed |
|---|---|---|---|
| CRO | Duje Ajduković | 177 | 1 |
| FRA | Hugo Grenier | 187 | 2 |
| TUN | Aziz Dougaz | 212 | 3 |
| FRA | Arthur Bouquier | 215 | 4 |
| GBR | Johannus Monday | 227 | 5 |
| GBR | Oliver Crawford | 234 | 6 |
| FRA | Clément Chidekh | 235 | 7 |
| FRA | Antoine Escoffier | 240 | 8 |

- ^{1} Rankings as of 14 July 2025.

=== Other entrants ===
The following players received wildcards into the singles main draw:

- (Spain) Mario González Fernández
- (Spain) Rafael Jódar
- (Spain) Iñaki Montes de la Torre

The following player received entry into the singles main draw through the Next Gen Accelerator programme:

- (India) Aryan Shah

The following player received entry into the singles main draw as an alternate:

- (Italy) Raúl Brancaccio

The following players received entry from the qualifying draw:

- (France) Robin Catry
- (Spain) John Echeverría
- (France) Arthur Reymond
- (Jordan) Abdullah Shelbayh
- (Colombia) Adrià Soriano Barrera
- (Germany) Max Wiskandt

== Champions ==
=== Singles ===
- (United Kingdom) George Loffhagen def. (Spain) Nicolás Álvarez Varona 7–6^{(7–4)}, 6–7^{(4–7)}, 6–4.

=== Doubles ===
- (Chile) Matías Soto / (Bolivia) Federico Zeballos def. (France) Arthur Reymond / (France) Luca Sanchez 3–6, 7–6^{(7–5)}, [16–14].
