= 2014 Open Castilla y León =

- Date: 28 July – 3 August
- Edition: 29th
- Location: Segovia, Spain

Champions

Singles
- (France) Adrian Mannarino

Doubles
- (Russia) Victor Baluda / (Russia) Alexander Kudryavtsev
- Open Castilla y León

The 2014 Open Castilla y León was a professional tennis tournament played on hard courts. It was the 29th edition of the tournament which was part of the 2014 ATP Challenger Tour. It took place in Segovia, Spain between 28 July and 3 August 2014.

== ATP entrants ==
=== Seeds ===
Country	Player	Rank^{1}	Seed
FRA	Adrian Mannarino	101	1
RUS	Alexander Kudryavtsev	149	2
TUR	Marsel İlhan	152	3
FRA	Grégoire Burquier	169	4
SUI	Marco Chiudinelli	173	5
RUS	Konstantin Kravchuk	177	6
SRB	Ilija Bozoljac	179	7
ESP	Adrián Menéndez Maceiras	195	8

- ^{1} Rankings are as of July 21, 2014.

=== Other entrants ===
The following players received wildcards into the singles main draw:

- (Spain) Alejandro Augusto Bueno
- (Spain) Antonio Cembellin
- (Chile) Cristian Garín
- (Spain) Jorge Hernando Ruano

The following players received entry from the qualifying draw:

- (United Kingdom) Brydan Klein
- (France) Florent Serra
- (Portugal) Frederico Ferreira Silva
- (China) Chuhan Wang

== Champions ==
=== Singles ===
- (France) Adrian Mannarino def. (Spain) Adrián Menéndez Maceiras 6–3, 6–0

=== Doubles ===
- (Russia) Victor Baluda / (Russia) Alexander Kudryavtsev def. (United Kingdom) Brydan Klein / (Croatia) Nikola Mektić 6–2, 4–6, [10–3]
