= 2017 Open Castilla y León – Men's singles =

Men's singles
- 2017 Open Castilla y León

Final
- Champion: (Spain) Jaume Munar
- Runner-up: (Australia) Alex De Minaur
- Score: 6–3, 6–4

Events
Singles	men	women
Doubles	men	women
- Open Castilla y León

Luca Vanni was the defending champion but lost in the first round to Gerard Granollers.

Jaume Munar won the title after defeating Alex De Minaur 6–3, 6–4 in the final.

== Seeds ==
1. (Spain) Marcel Granollers (quarterfinals)
2. (Germany) Peter Gojowczyk (first round)
3. (Ukraine) Sergiy Stakhovsky (first round)
4. (Italy) Luca Vanni (first round)
5. (Belarus) Egor Gerasimov (first round)
6. (Spain) Adrián Menéndez-Maceiras (first round)
7. (Italy) Matteo Berrettini (semifinals)
8. (Belarus) Ilya Ivashka (first round)

== Draw ==
Key

- Q = Qualifier
- WC = Wild card
- LL = Lucky loser
- Alt = Alternate
- ITF = ITF entry
- PR = Protected ranking
- SR = Special ranking
- SE = Special exempt
- JE = Junior exempt
- JR = Junior Accelerator Programme entrant
- CO = College Accelerator Programme entrant
- NG = Next Gen Accelerator Program entrant
- w/o = Walkover
- r = Retired
- d = Defaulted

=== Finals ===
Semifinals
(Spain) Jaume Munar	7^{7}	6^{5}	6
WC	(Spain) Gerard Granollers	6^{5}	7^{7}	2
(Australia) Alex De Minaur	7^{7}	7
7	(Italy) Matteo Berrettini	6^{4}	5

Final
(Spain) Jaume Munar	6	6
(Australia) Alex De Minaur	3	4

=== Top half ===
First round
1	(Spain) M Granollers	6^{5}	7^{7}	6
(Chile) C Garin	7^{7}	6^{2}	4
WC	(Spain) C Taberner	7^{7}	2	7
Q	(France) Mick Lescure	6^{2}	6	5
(Spain) J Munar	6	6
(France) A Olivetti	3	2
(Turkey) C İlkel	7^{9}	7^{7}
8	(Belarus) I Ivashka	6^{7}	6^{1}
4	(Italy) L Vanni	3	4
WC	(Spain) G Granollers	6	6
(Switzerland) M Chiudinelli	7^{7}	6
WC	(Spain) B Zapata Miralles	6^{2}	1
(Portugal) G Oliveira	6	3	6
(Belgium) Y Mertens	3	6	4
(France) L Lokoli	6	6
5	(Belarus) E Gerasimov	3	2

Second round
1	(Spain) M Granollers	6	6
WC	(Spain) C Taberner	1	4
(Spain) J Munar	6	7^{7}
(Turkey) C İlkel	2	6^{2}
WC	(Spain) G Granollers	6	2	7
(Switzerland) M Chiudinelli	4	6	5
(Portugal) G Oliveira	6	6^{2}	4
(France) L Lokoli	4	7^{7}	6

Quarterfinals
1	(Spain) M Granollers	3	4
(Spain) J Munar	6	6
WC	(Spain) G Granollers	6	6
(France) L Lokoli	4	4

Semifinals
(Spain) J Munar	7^{7}	6^{5}	6
WC	(Spain) G Granollers	6^{5}	7^{7}	2

=== Bottom half ===
First round
6	(Spain) A Menéndez-Maceiras	6^{6}	6^{4}
(Australia) A De Minaur	7^{8}	7^{7}
Q	(Spain) D Vega Hernández	2	1
(Egypt) K-M Maamoun	6	6
(Netherlands) T Griekspoor	6	6^{3}	7
(Spain) P Martínez	4	7^{7}	5
(Canada) S Diez	2	7^{10}	6
3	(Ukraine) S Stakhovsky	6	6^{8}	3
7	(Italy) M Berrettini	6	4	6
Q	(France) H Grenier	3	6	3
WC	(Spain) N Álvarez Varona	0	2
(France) B Bonzi	6	6
Q	(Italy) Edoardo Eremin	7^{7}	2	0^{r}
(Brazil) A Ghem	6^{3}	6	1
(Bosnia and Herzegovina) A Šetkić	6	6
2	(Germany) P Gojowczyk	3	4

Second round
(Australia) A De Minaur	6	7^{12}
(Egypt) K-M Maamoun	2	6^{10}
(Netherlands) T Griekspoor	6	7
(Canada) S Diez	4	5
7	(Italy) M Berrettini	6	6
(France) B Bonzi	4	4
(Brazil) A Ghem	3	5
(Bosnia and Herzegovina) A Šetkić	6	7

Quarterfinals
(Australia) A De Minaur	7^{7}	6
(Netherlands) T Griekspoor	6^{5}	4
7	(Italy) M Berrettini	6^{5}	7^{7}	6
(Bosnia and Herzegovina) A Šetkić	7^{7}	6^{5}	4

Semifinals
(Australia) A De Minaur	7^{7}	7
7	(Italy) M Berrettini	6^{4}	5
