= 2012 Open Castilla y León – Doubles =

Doubles
- 2012 Open Castilla y León

Final
- Champions: (Italy) Stefano Ianni; (Romania) Florin Mergea
- Runners-up: (Russia) Konstantin Kravchuk; (Austria) Nikolaus Moser
- Score: 6–2, 6–3

Events
Singles	Doubles
- Open Castilla y León

Johan Brunström and Frederik Nielsen were the defending champions, but decided not to participate.
Stefano Ianni and Florin Mergea won the title by defeating Konstantin Kravchuk and Nikolaus Moser 6–2, 6–3 in the final.

== Seeds ==
1. (Italy) Stefano Ianni / (Romania) Florin Mergea (champions)
2. (France) Olivier Charroin / (India) Purav Raja (quarterfinals)
3. (Croatia) Marin Draganja / (Croatia) Lovro Zovko (semifinals)
4. (Australia) Rameez Junaid / (Germany) Philipp Marx (quarterfinals)

== Draw ==
Key

- Q = Qualifier
- WC = Wild card
- LL = Lucky loser
- Alt = Alternate
- ITF = ITF entry
- PR = Protected ranking
- SR = Special ranking
- SE = Special exempt
- JE = Junior exempt
- JR = Junior Accelerator Programme entrant
- CO = College Accelerator Programme entrant
- NG = Next Gen Accelerator Program entrant
- w/o = Walkover
- r = Retired
- d = Defaulted

=== Draw ===
First round

Quarterfinals

Semifinals

Final

1
- (Italy) S Ianni
- (Romania) F Mergea
6
6

- (Canada) S Diez
- (Serbia) D Lajović
2
1

1
- (Italy) S Ianni
- (Romania) F Mergea
6
6

WC
(Spain) Jorge Hernando Ruano
(Spain) Ricardo Villacorta-Alonso
4
6
[7]

- (Romania) A Dăescu
- (Italy) A Motti
1
4

- (Romania) A Dăescu
- (Italy) A Motti
6
3
[10]

1
- (Italy) S Ianni
- (Romania) F Mergea
6
3
[11]

3
- (Croatia) M Draganja
- (Croatia) L Zovko
6^{2}
6
[10]

3
- (Croatia) M Draganja
- (Croatia) L Zovko
4
6
[9]

- (Spain) G Granollers
- (Spain) D Muñoz de la Nava
7^{7}
2
[5]

3
- (Croatia) M Draganja
- (Croatia) L Zovko
2
7^{7}
[11]

- (Montenegro) G Tošić
- (United States) D Zivkovic
6
6

- (Montenegro) G Tošić
- (United States) D Zivkovic
6
6^{5}
[9]

- (France) K de Schepper
- (France) A Olivetti
3
3

1
- (Italy) S Ianni
- (Romania) F Mergea
6
6

WC
(Spain) A Artuñedo
(Spain) Jaime Pulgar-García
2
4

- (Russia) K Kravchuk
- (Austria) N Moser
2
3

- (Russia) K Kravchuk
- (Austria) N Moser
6
6

- (Russia) K Kravchuk
- (Austria) N Moser
7^{7}
6

- (Republic of Ireland) James Cluskey
- (France) F Martin
6^{5}
5

4
- (Australia) R Junaid
- (Germany) P Marx
6^{3}
2

4
- (Australia) R Junaid
- (Germany) P Marx
7^{7}
7

- (Russia) K Kravchuk
- (Austria) N Moser
6
6

WC
- (Spain) Vicente Joli-Viera
- (Spain) I Navarro
3
6
[7]

- (France) Julien Obry
- (Serbia) B Pašanski
3
0

- (France) Julien Obry
- (Serbia) B Pašanski
6
1
[10]

- (France) Julien Obry
- (Serbia) B Pašanski
0
6
[10]

- (Italy) Lorenzo Giustino
- (Croatia) N Mektić
4
0

2
- (France) O Charroin
- (India) P Raja
6
3
[5]

2
- (France) O Charroin
- (India) P Raja
6
6
