= 2022 Open Castilla y León =

2022 ATP Challenger Tour tennis tournament

- Date: 25 – 31 July
- Edition: 36th
- Surface: Hard
- Location: Segovia, Spain

Champions

Singles
- (France) Hugo Grenier

Doubles
- (Spain) Nicolás Álvarez Varona / (Spain) Iñaki Montes de la Torre
- Open Castilla y León

The 2022 Open Castilla y León Villa de El Espinar was a professional tennis tournament played on outdoor hard courts. It was the 36th edition of the tournament and part of the 2022 ATP Challenger Tour. It took place in El Espinar, Segovia, Spain, between 25 and 31 July 2022.

== Singles main draw entrants ==
=== Seeds ===
Country	Player	Rank^{1}	Seed
POR	Nuno Borges	111	1
FRA	Constant Lestienne	119	2
ESP	Fernando Verdasco	126	3
FRA	Hugo Grenier	132	4
FRA	Ugo Humbert	157	5
TUR	Altuğ Çelikbilek	164	6
KAZ	Dmitry Popko	189	7
FRA	Grégoire Barrère	192	8

- ^{1} Rankings as of 18 July 2022.

=== Other entrants ===
The following players received wildcards into the singles main draw:

- (Spain) Julio César Porras
- (Spain) Alejandro Moro Cañas
- (Spain) Daniel Rincón

The following player received entry into the singles main draw as a special exempt:

- (Kazakhstan) Denis Yevseyev

The following players received entry into the singles main draw as alternates:

- (Spain) Nicolás Álvarez Varona
- (Ukraine) Illya Marchenko

The following players received entry from the qualifying draw:

- (Spain) Alberto Barroso Campos
- (Brazil) Gabriel Décamps
- (Uzbekistan) Denis Istomin
- Alibek Kachmazov
- (Zimbabwe) Benjamin Lock
- (Spain) Adrián Menéndez Maceiras

== Champions ==
=== Singles ===
- (France) Hugo Grenier def. (France) Constant Lestienne 7–5, 6–3.

=== Doubles ===
- (Spain) Nicolás Álvarez Varona / (Spain) Iñaki Montes de la Torre def. (Zimbabwe) Benjamin Lock / (Zimbabwe) Courtney John Lock 7–6^{(7–3)}, 6–3.
