= 2012 Open Castilla y León =

- Date: 21–27 August
- Edition: 27th
- Location: Segovia, Spain

Champions

Singles
- (Russia) Evgeny Donskoy

Doubles
- (Italy) Stefano Ianni / (Romania) Florin Mergea
- Open Castilla y León

The 2012 Open Castilla y León was a professional tennis tournament played on hard courts. It was the 27th edition of the tournament which was part of the Tretorn SERIE+ of the 2012 ATP Challenger Tour. It took place in Segovia, Spain between 21 and 27 August 2012.

== ATP entrants ==
=== Seeds ===
Country	Player	Rank^{1}	Seed
ESP	Daniel Gimeno Traver	110	1
ESP	Daniel Muñoz de la Nava	126	2
SRB	Dušan Lajović	138	3
RUS	Evgeny Donskoy	142	4
RUS	Konstantin Kravchuk	207	5
FRA	Kenny de Schepper	214	6
ARG	Facundo Argüello	229	7
ESP	Iván Navarro	239	8

- ^{1} Rankings are as of August 13, 2012.

=== Other entrants ===
The following players received wildcards into the singles main draw:

- (Spain) Andrés Artuñedo Martínavarr
- (Spain) Carlos Benito Hergueta
- (Spain) Jorge Hernando Ruano
- (Spain) Ricardo Villacorta-Alonso

The following players received entry from the qualifying draw:

- (Croatia) Marin Draganja
- (Romania) Cătălin-Ionuț Gârd
- (Austria) Nikolaus Moser
- (Italy) Luca Vanni

== Champions ==
=== Singles ===
- (Russia) Evgeny Donskoy def. (France) Albano Olivetti, 6–1, 7–6^{(13–11)}

=== Doubles ===
- (Italy) Stefano Ianni / (Romania) Florin Mergea def. (Russia) Konstantin Kravchuk / (Austria) Nikolaus Moser, 6–2, 6–3
