= 2011 Open Castilla y León =

- Date: 1–7 August
- Edition: 26th
- Location: Segovia, Spain

Champions

Singles
- (Slovakia) Karol Beck

Doubles
- (Sweden) Johan Brunström / (Denmark) Frederik Nielsen
- Open Castilla y León

The 2011 Open Castilla y León was a professional tennis tournament played on hard courts. It was the 26th edition of the tournament which was part of the Tretorn SERIE+ of the 2011 ATP Challenger Tour. It took place in Segovia, Spain between 1 and 7 August 2011.

== ATP entrants ==
=== Seeds ===
Country	Player	Rank^{1}	Seed
KAZ	Mikhail Kukushkin	69	1
FRA	Nicolas Mahut	96	2
SVK	Karol Beck	100	3
GER	Rainer Schüttler	116	4
RUS	Teymuraz Gabashvili	133	5
FRA	Kenny de Schepper	144	6
BEL	Ruben Bemelmans	145	7
FRA	Arnaud Clément	146	8

- ^{1} Rankings are as of July 25, 2011.

=== Other entrants ===
The following players received wildcards into the singles main draw:

- (Spain) Guillermo Alcaide
- (Spain) Pablo Carreño Busta
- (Spain) Gerard Granollers
- (Romania) Christian Voinea

The following players received entry as a special exempt into the singles main draw:

- (Finland) Henri Kontinen
- (France) Fabrice Martin

The following players received entry from the qualifying draw:

- (Spain) Jaime Pulgar-García
- (Croatia) Nikola Mektić
- (Spain) Adrián Menéndez
- (Bolivia) Federico Zeballos

The following players received entry as a lucky loser into the singles main draw:

- (France) Albano Olivetti

== Champions ==
=== Singles ===
(Slovakia) Karol Beck def. (France) Grégoire Burquier, 6–4, 7–6^{(7–4)}

=== Doubles ===
(Sweden) Johan Brunström / (Denmark) Frederik Nielsen def. (France) Nicolas Mahut / (Croatia) Lovro Zovko, 6–2, 3–6, [10–6]
