= 2012 Open Castilla y León – Singles =

Singles
- 2012 Open Castilla y León

Final
- Champion: (Russia) Evgeny Donskoy
- Runner-up: (France) Albano Olivetti
- Score: 6–1, 7–6^{(13–11)}

Events
Singles	Doubles
- Open Castilla y León

Karol Beck was the defending champion, but chose not to participate this year.
Evgeny Donskoy won the tournament by defeating Albano Olivetti 6–1, 7–6^{(13–11)} in the final.

== Seeds ==
1. (Spain) Daniel Gimeno Traver (quarterfinals)
2. (Spain) Daniel Muñoz de la Nava (first round)
3. (Serbia) Dušan Lajović (second round)
4. (Russia) Evgeny Donskoy (champion)
5. (Russia) Konstantin Kravchuk (semifinals)
6. (France) Kenny de Schepper (second round)
7. (Argentina) Facundo Argüello (second round)
8. (Spain) Iván Navarro (second round)

== Draw ==
Key

- Q = Qualifier
- WC = Wild card
- LL = Lucky loser
- Alt = Alternate
- ITF = ITF entry
- PR = Protected ranking
- SR = Special ranking
- SE = Special exempt
- JE = Junior exempt
- JR = Junior Accelerator Programme entrant
- CO = College Accelerator Programme entrant
- NG = Next Gen Accelerator Program entrant
- w/o = Walkover
- r = Retired
- d = Defaulted

=== Finals ===
Semifinals
(France) Albano Olivetti	6	6
(Italy) Riccardo Ghedin	2	4
4	(Russia) Evgeny Donskoy	6	6
5	(Russia) Konstantin Kravchuk	4	2

Final
(France) Albano Olivetti	1	6^{11}
4	(Russia) Evgeny Donskoy	6	7^{13}

=== Top half ===
First round
1	(Spain) D Gimeno Traver	6	6
WC	(Spain) Carlos Benito Hergueta	3	1
(Czech Republic) J Minář	6	6^{7}	0
(Switzerland) Adrien Bossel	3	7^{9}	6
(France) A Olivetti	6	6
(Croatia) D Marcan	1	2
(Canada) S Diez	2	3
8	(Spain) I Navarro	6	6
3	(Serbia) D Lajović	6	6
Q	(Austria) N Moser	2	2
(Serbia) B Pašanski	2	2
(Italy) R Ghedin	6	6
WC	(Spain) Jorge Hernando Ruano	3	3
Q	(Croatia) M Draganja	6	6
(Switzerland) S Bohli	6^{4}	3
7	(Argentina) F Argüello	7^{7}	6

Second round
1	(Spain) D Gimeno Traver	6	6
(Switzerland) Adrien Bossel	4	3
(France) A Olivetti	7^{8}	7^{7}
8	(Spain) I Navarro	6^{6}	6^{4}
3	(Serbia) D Lajović	6^{4}	7	3
(Italy) R Ghedin	7^{7}	5	6
Q	(Croatia) M Draganja	6	6
7	(Argentina) F Argüello	2	1

Quarterfinals
1	(Spain) D Gimeno Traver	4	6	6^{6}
(France) A Olivetti	6	4	7^{8}
(Italy) R Ghedin	6	4	6
Q	(Croatia) M Draganja	3	6	3

Semifinals
(France) A Olivetti	6	6
(Italy) R Ghedin	2	4

=== Bottom half ===
First round
6	(France) K de Schepper	6	6
(Japan) T Daniel	2	1
Q	(Italy) L Vanni	6	5	1
(Spain) G Granollers	4	7	6
(Spain) G Olaso	6	4
(France) N Renavand	1	1^{r}
WC	(Spain) Ricardo Villacorta-Alonso	6^{8}	2
4	(Russia) E Donskoy	7^{10}	6
5	(Russia) K Kravchuk	7^{7}	6^{1}	6
(Croatia) N Mektić	6^{2}	7^{7}	4
(United States) D Zivkovic	6	7
Q	(Romania) C-I Gârd	4	5
(France) F Martin	6^{4}	6	4
(France) Julien Obry	7^{7}	3	6
WC	(Spain) A Artuñedo	7^{7}	6
2	(Spain) D Muñoz de la Nava	6^{5}	4

Second round
6	(France) K de Schepper	4	4
(Spain) G Granollers	6	6
(Spain) G Olaso	4	3
4	(Russia) E Donskoy	6	6
5	(Russia) K Kravchuk	6	6
(United States) D Zivkovic	4	2
(France) Julien Obry	3	6	1
WC	(Spain) A Artuñedo	6	3	6

Quarterfinals
(Spain) G Granollers	0	2
4	(Russia) E Donskoy	6	6
5	(Russia) K Kravchuk	6	6
WC	(Spain) A Artuñedo	4	4

Semifinals
4	(Russia) E Donskoy	6	6
5	(Russia) K Kravchuk	4	2
