= 2013 Open Castilla y León =

- Date: 29 July – 4 August
- Edition: 28th
- Location: Segovia, Spain

Champions

Singles
- (Spain) Pablo Carreño Busta

Doubles
- (United Kingdom) Ken Skupski / (United Kingdom) Neal Skupski
- Open Castilla y León

The 2013 Open Castilla y León was a professional tennis tournament played on hard courts. It was the 28th edition of the tournament which was part of the 2013 ATP Challenger Tour. It took place in Segovia, Spain between 29 July and 4 August 2013.

== ATP entrants ==
=== Seeds ===
| Country | Player | Rank^{1} | Seed |
|---|---|---|---|
| ESP | Pablo Carreño Busta | 115 | 1 |
| ROU | Marius Copil | 137 | 2 |
| KAZ | Andrey Golubev | 141 | 3 |
| ITA | Flavio Cipolla | 145 | 4 |
| SUI | Marco Chiudinelli | 158 | 5 |
| BLR | Uladzimir Ignatik | 168 | 6 |
| FRA | Florent Serra | 182 | 7 |
| FRA | Pierre-Hugues Herbert | 218 | 8 |

- ^{1} Rankings are as of July 22, 2013.

=== Other entrants ===
The following players received wildcards into the singles main draw:

- (Spain) Iván Arenas-Gualda
- (Spain) Roberto Ortega-Olmedo
- (Spain) Ricardo Villacorta-Alonso
- (Romania) Christian Florentin Voinea

The following players received entry as special exempt:

- (Spain) Andrés Artuñedo Martínavarr

The following players received entry as protected ranking:

- (France) Albano Olivetti

The following players received entry as an alternate:

- (United Kingdom) Alexander Ward
- (Spain) Iván Navarro

The following players received entry from the qualifying draw:

- (Italy) Erik Crepaldi
- (Russia) Mikhail Elgin
- (Greece) Alexandros Jakupovic
- (United Kingdom) David Rice

== Champions ==
=== Singles ===
- (Spain) Pablo Carreño Busta def. (France) Albano Olivetti 6–4, 7–6^{(7–2)}

=== Doubles ===
- (United Kingdom) Ken Skupski / (United Kingdom) Neal Skupski def. (Russia) Mikhail Elgin / (Belarus) Uladzimir Ignatik 6–3, 6–7^{(4–7)}, [10–6]
