= 2024 Open Castilla y León =

- Date: 22 – 28 July
- Edition: 38th
- Surface: Hard
- Location: Segovia, Spain

Champions

Singles
- (France) Antoine Escoffier

Doubles
- (France) Dan Added / (France) Arthur Reymond
- Open Castilla y León

The 2024 Open Castilla y León Villa de El Espinar was a professional tennis tournament played on outdoor hard courts. It was the 38th edition of the tournament and part of the 2024 ATP Challenger Tour. It took place in El Espinar, Segovia, Spain, between 22 and 28 July 2024.

== Singles main draw entrants ==
=== Seeds ===
Country	Player	Rank^{1}	Seed
FRA	Antoine Escoffier	209	1
FRA	Jules Marie	230	2
	Alibek Kachmazov	255	3
	Egor Gerasimov	265	4
FRA	Robin Bertrand	279	5
BEL	Michael Geerts	319	6
DEN	August Holmgren	320	7
UKR	Vadym Ursu	336	8

- ^{1} Rankings as of 15 July 2024.

=== Other entrants ===
The following players received wildcards into the singles main draw:

- (Spain) Nicolás Álvarez Varona
- (Spain) Mario González Fernández
- (Spain) Alejo Sánchez Quílez

The following player received entry into the singles main draw as an alternate:

- (Spain) Iñaki Montes de la Torre

The following players received entry from the qualifying draw:

- (Italy) Fabrizio Andaloro
- (Spain) John Echeverría
- (Spain) Iván Marrero Curbelo
- (Spain) Àlex Martínez
- (Colombia) Adrià Soriano Barrera
- (Germany) Max Wiskandt

== Champions ==
=== Singles ===
- (France) Antoine Escoffier def. (Spain) Àlex Martínez 6–3, 2–6, 6–3.

=== Doubles ===
- (France) Dan Added / (France) Arthur Reymond def. (Bulgaria) Alexander Donski / (Portugal) Tiago Pereira 6–4, 6–3.
