= 2017 Open Castilla y León =

- Date: 31 July – 6 August
- Edition: 32nd (men); 3rd (women)
- Category: ATP Challenger Tour; ITF Women's Circuit
- Surface: Hard
- Location: Segovia, Spain

Champions

Men's singles
- (Spain) Jaume Munar

Women's singles
- (Spain) Paula Badosa Gibert

Men's doubles
- (Spain) Adrián Menéndez-Maceiras / (Ukraine) Sergiy Stakhovsky

Women's doubles
- (United States) Quinn Gleason / (Brazil) Luisa Stefani
- Open Castilla y León

The 2017 Open Castilla y León was a professional tennis tournament played on outdoor hard courts. It was the 32nd edition, for men, and 3rd edition, for women, of the tournament and part of the 2017 ATP Challenger Tour and the 2017 ITF Women's Circuit. It took place in El Espinar, Segovia, Spain, between 31 July – 6 August 2017.

== Men's singles main draw entrants ==
=== Seeds ===
Country	Player	Rank^{1}	Seed
ESP	Marcel Granollers	106	1
GER	Peter Gojowczyk	108	2
UKR	Sergiy Stakhovsky	115	3
ITA	Luca Vanni	119	4
BLR	Egor Gerasimov	123	5
ESP	Adrián Menéndez-Maceiras	137	6
ITA	Matteo Berrettini	173	7
BLR	Ilya Ivashka	182	8

- ^{1} Rankings as of 24 July 2017.

=== Other entrants ===
The following players received wildcards into the singles main draw:

- (Spain) Nicolás Álvarez Varona
- (Spain) Gerard Granollers
- (Spain) Carlos Taberner
- (Spain) Bernabé Zapata Miralles

The following players received entry from the qualifying draw:

- (Italy) Edoardo Eremin
- (France) Hugo Grenier
- (France) Mick Lescure
- (Spain) David Vega Hernández

== Women's singles main draw entrants ==
=== Seeds ===
Country	Player	Rank^{1}	Seed
HUN	Dalma Gálfi	142	1
ESP	Olga Sáez Larra	236	2
MEX	Renata Zarazúa	245	3
GEO	Sofia Shapatava	251	4
ITA	Giulia Gatto-Monticone	268	5
TUR	Ayla Aksu	283	6
BUL	Aleksandrina Naydenova	286	7
NED	Bibiane Schoofs	296	8

- ^{1} Rankings as of 24 July 2017.

=== Other entrants ===
The following player received a wildcard into the singles main draw:

- (Spain) Marina Bassols Ribera
- (Spain) Ángela Díez Plágaro
- (Spain) Claudia Hoste Ferrer
- (Russia) Vera Zvonareva

The following players received entry from the qualifying draw:

- (Spain) Ainhoa Atucha Gómez
- (Spain) Alba Carrillo Marín
- (Spain) Rocío de la Torre Sánchez
- (Spain) Marta Huqing González Encinas
- (Spain) María Gutiérrez Carrasco
- (Spain) Nuria Párrizas Díaz
- (Brazil) Luisa Stefani
- (Bolivia) Noelia Zeballos

== Champions ==
=== Men's singles ===
- (Spain) Jaume Munar def. (Australia) Alex De Minaur 6–3, 6–4.

=== Women's singles ===
- (Spain) Paula Badosa Gibert def. (Turkey) Ayla Aksu, 6–2, 6–4

=== Men's doubles ===
- (Spain) Adrián Menéndez-Maceiras / (Ukraine) Sergiy Stakhovsky def. (Spain) Roberto Ortega Olmedo / (Spain) David Vega Hernández 4–6, 6–3, [10–7].

=== Women's doubles ===
- (United States) Quinn Gleason / (Brazil) Luisa Stefani def. (Turkey) Ayla Aksu / (Netherlands) Bibiane Schoofs, 6–3, 6–2
