= 2016 Open Castilla y León =

- Date: 25–31 July
- Edition: 31st (men); 2nd (women)
- Category: ATP Challenger Tour; ITF Women's Circuit
- Prize money: €64,000+H (men) $10,000 (women)
- Surface: Hard
- Location: Segovia, Spain

Champions

Men's singles
- (Italy) Luca Vanni

Women's singles
- (France) Jessika Ponchet

Men's doubles
- (India) Purav Raja / (India) Divij Sharan

Women's doubles
- (Ecuador) Charlotte Römer / (Germany) Sarah-Rebecca Sekulic
- Open Castilla y León

The 2016 Open Castilla y León was a professional tennis tournament played on outdoor hard courts. It was the 31st edition, for men, and 2nd edition, for women, of the tournament and part of the 2016 ATP Challenger Tour and the 2016 ITF Women's Circuit, offering totals of €64,000+H, for men, and $10,000, for women, in prize money. It took place in El Espinar, Segovia, Spain, on 25–31 July 2016.

== Men's singles main draw entrants ==
=== Seeds ===
| Country | Player | Rank^{1} | Seed |
|---|---|---|---|
| ESP | Nicolás Almagro | 45 | 1 |
| CZE | Lukáš Rosol | 79 | 2 |
| UKR | Illya Marchenko | 84 | 3 |
| SUI | Marco Chiudinelli | 129 | 4 |
| BIH | Mirza Bašić | 139 | 5 |
| POL | Jerzy Janowicz | 149 | 6 |
| FRA | Kenny de Schepper | 159 | 7 |
| HUN | Márton Fucsovics | 166 | 8 |

- ^{1} Rankings as of 18 July 2016.

=== Other entrants ===
The following player received a wildcard into the singles main draw:

- (Spain) Nicolás Almagro
- (Spain) Jorge Hernando Ruano
- (Japan) Akira Santillan
- (Spain) Ricardo Villacorta-Alonso

The following players received entry into the singles main draw with a protected ranking:

- (France) Rémi Boutillier
- (France) Albano Olivetti

The following players received entry from the qualifying draw:

- (United Kingdom) Daniel Cox
- (Australia) Alex De Minaur
- (Norway) Viktor Durasovic
- (Spain) Jaume Pla Malfeito

== Women's singles main draw entrants ==
=== Seeds ===
| Country | Player | Rank^{1} | Seed |
|---|---|---|---|
| SVK | Michaela Hončová | 365 | 1 |
| ITA | Giulia Gatto-Monticone | 484 | 2 |
| FRA | Jessika Ponchet | 547 | 3 |
| ROU | Ioana Loredana Roșca | 565 | 4 |
| ITA | Bianca Turati | 611 | 5 |
| ESP | María José Luque Moreno | 621 | 6 |
| AUS | Isabelle Wallace | 651 | 7 |
| POR | Inês Murta | 716 | 8 |

- ^{1} Rankings as of 18 July 2016.

=== Other entrants ===
The following player received a wildcard into the singles main draw:

- (Spain) Arabela Fernández Rabener
- (Slovakia) Michaela Hončová
- (Spain) Claudia Hoste Ferrer
- (Spain) Ana Román Domínguez

The following players received entry from the qualifying draw:

- (United Kingdom) Lucy Brown
- (Spain) Alba Carrillo Marín
- (Spain) Yésica de Lucas
- (United Kingdom) Jazzamay Drew
- (Spain) Ángela Fita Boluda
- (Spain) Lucía Marzal Martínez
- (Japan) Yuriko Miyazaki
- (Italy) Giorgia Pinto

The following player received entry by a lucky loser spot:

- (United Kingdom) Laura Sainsbury

== Champions ==
=== Men's singles ===
- (Italy) Luca Vanni def. (Ukraine) Illya Marchenko, 6–4, 3–6, 6–3.

=== Women's singles ===
- (France) Jessika Ponchet def. (Spain) Rocío de la Torre Sánchez, 6–4, 6–2

=== Men's doubles ===
- (India) Purav Raja / (India) Divij Sharan def. (Spain) Quino Muñoz / (Japan) Akira Santillan, 6–3, 4–6, [10–8]

=== Women's doubles ===
- (Ecuador) Charlotte Römer / (Germany) Sarah-Rebecca Sekulic def. (France) Jessika Ponchet / (Romania) Ioana Loredana Roșca, 6–2, 7–6^{(7–4)}
