= 2015 Open Castilla y León =

- Date: 3–9 August
- Edition: 30th
- Location: Segovia, Spain

Champions

Singles
- (Russia) Evgeny Donskoy

Doubles
- (Russia) Alexander Kudryavtsev / (Ukraine) Denys Molchanov
- Open Castilla y León

The 2015 Open Castilla y León was a professional tennis tournament played on hard courts. It was the 30th edition of the tournament which was part of the 2015 ATP Challenger Tour. It took place in Segovia, Spain between 3 and 9 August 2015.

== Singles main-draw entrants ==
=== Seeds ===
Country	Player	Rank^{1}	Seed
ESP	Marcel Granollers	73	1
GER	Dustin Brown	81	2
GER	Matthias Bachinger	110	3
ESP	Adrián Menéndez Maceiras	117	4
BIH	Mirza Bašić	153	5
GER	Peter Gojowczyk	155	6
FRA	Vincent Millot	162	7
RUS	Alexander Kudryavtsev	166	8

- ^{1} Rankings are as of July 28, 2015.

=== Other entrants ===
The following players received wildcards into the singles main draw:

- (Spain) Francisco Blanco Paris
- (South Korea) Chung Yun-seong
- (Spain) Marcel Granollers
- (Spain) Jorge Ruano

The following player entered using a protected ranking:

- (Switzerland) Marco Chiudinelli

The following players received entry from the qualifying draw:

- (France) Sébastien Boltz
- (Belarus) Egor Gerasimov
- (Croatia) Nikola Mektić
- (Spain) Georgi Rumenov

The following players received entry by a lucky loser spot:

- (Italy) Riccardo Ghedin
- (Spain) Roberto Ortega-Olmedo

== Champions ==
=== Singles ===
- (Russia) Evgeny Donskoy def. (Switzerland) Marco Chiudinelli 7–6^{(7–2)}, 6–3

=== Doubles ===
- (Russia) Alexander Kudryavtsev / (Ukraine) Denys Molchanov def. (Belarus) Aliaksandr Bury / (Sweden) Andreas Siljeström 6–2, 6–4
