= Open Castilla y León =

Open Castilla y León Villa de El Espinar

Tournament information
- Location: El Espinar, Segovia, Spain
- Venue: Villa de El Espinar
- Surface: Hard
- Website: teniselespinar.com
ATP Tour
- Category: ATP Challenger Tour, Tretorn SERIE+
- Draw: 32S / 32Q / 16D
- Prize money: €91,250 (2025), €64,000+H (2016)
WTA Tour
- Category: ITF Women's Circuit
- Draw: 32S / 32Q / 16D
- Prize money: $25,000

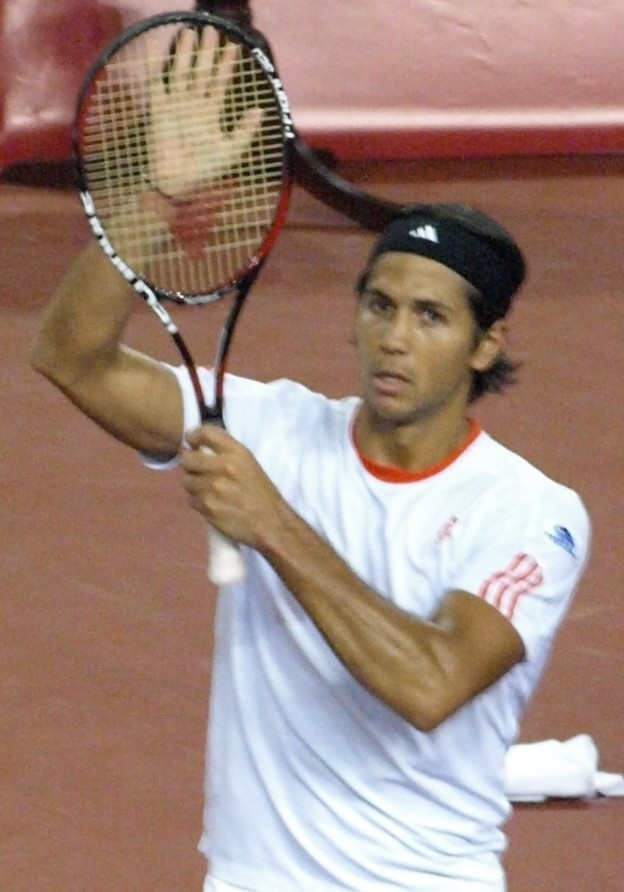
Future top tenner Fernando Verdasco from Spain, 2002 runner-up, eventually took the singles title in 2007

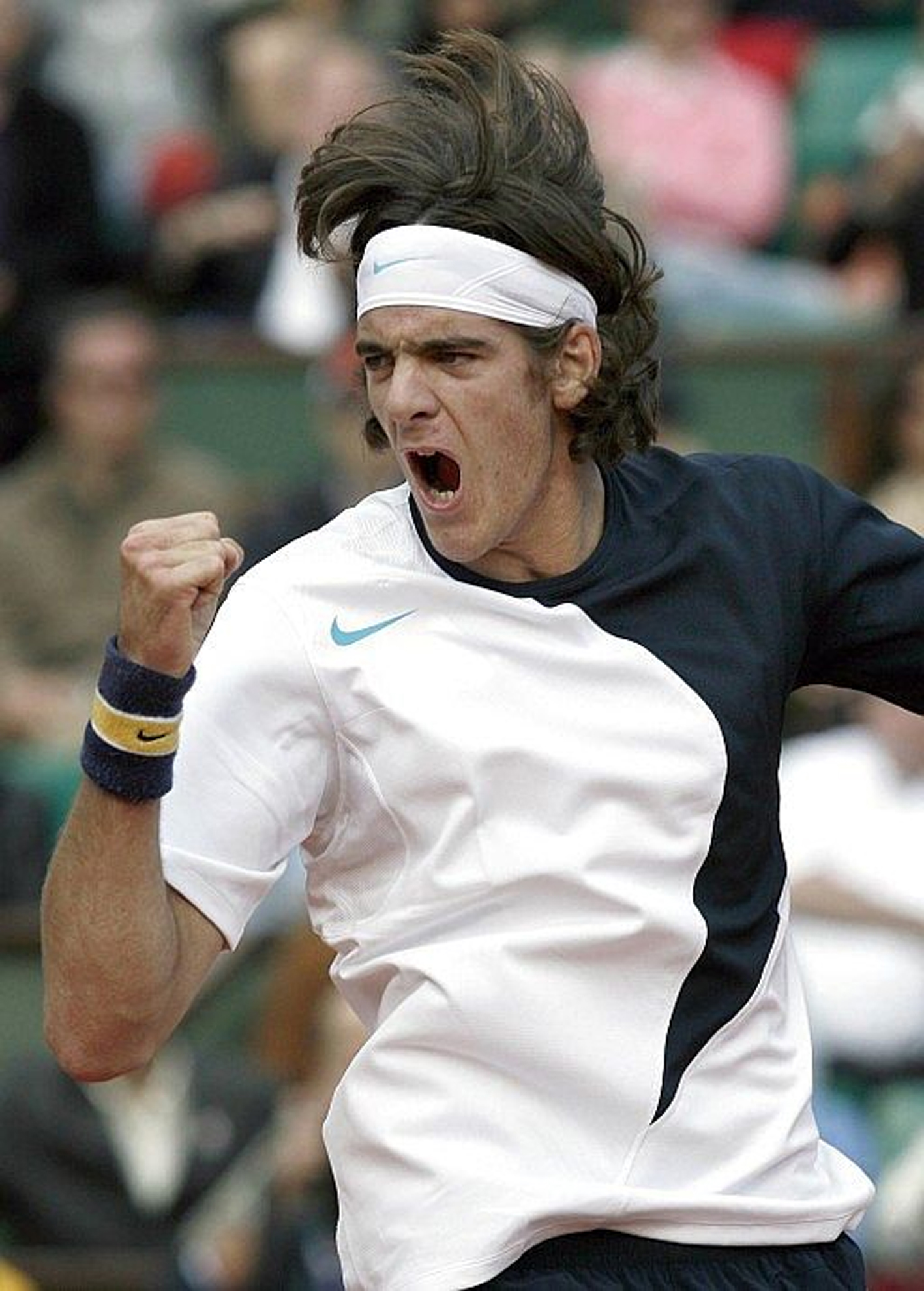
Argentine top tenner Juan Martín del Potro won the singles in 2006

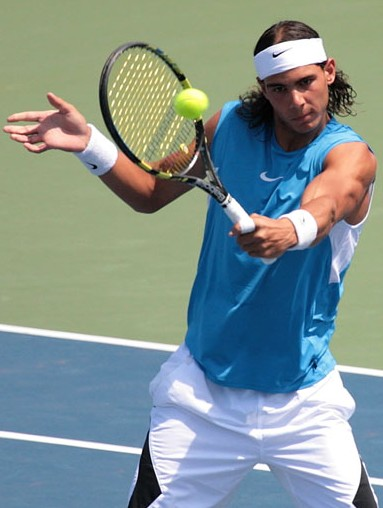
Seventeen-year-old, eventual World No. 1 Rafael Nadal from Spain clinched the victory in singles in 2003

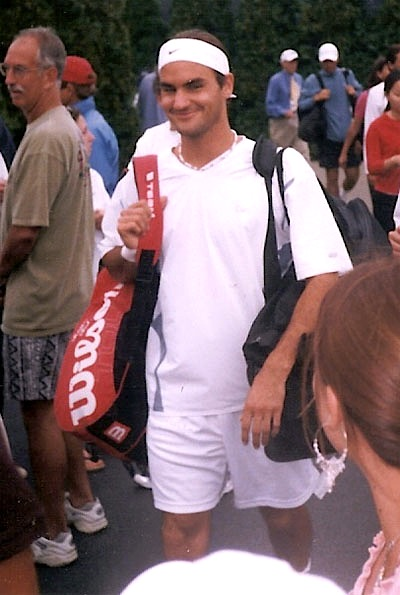
Future World No. 1 Roger Federer from Switzerland partnered Sander Groen to a doubles victory in 1999

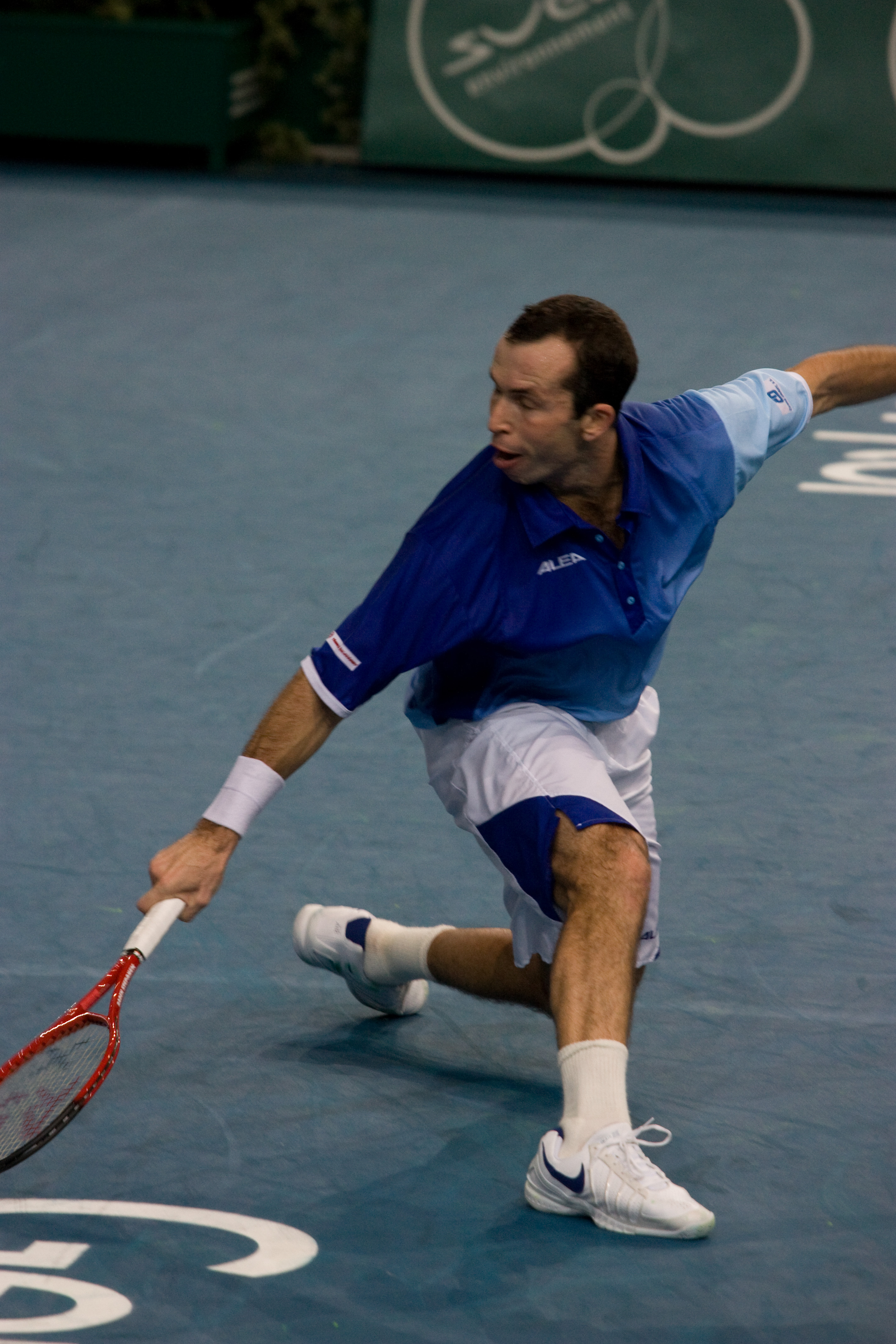
A nineteen-year-old Radek Štěpánek won both singles and doubles titles in 1998 for the Czech Republic

The Open Castilla y León Villa de El Espinar is a professional tennis tournament played on outdoor hardcourts. It is currently part of the ATP Challenger Tour and the ITF Women's Circuit. It has been held annually at the Villa de El Espinar in El Espinar, Segovia Province, Spain since 1986 (as a Spanish Tennis Federation event from 1986 to 1990, as a Challenger since 1991). The men's event was part of the Tretorn SERIE+ from 2019 to 2011. The women's event was added to the tournament in 2015.

== Past finals ==
=== Key ===
Challenger
Non-Tour Event

=== Men's singles ===
Year	Champion	Runner-up	Score
2026	(France) Luka Pavlovic	(France) Matteo Martineau	6–4, 3–6, 6–1
2025	(United Kingdom) George Loffhagen	(Spain) Nicolás Álvarez Varona	7–6^{(7–4)}, 6–7^{(4–7)}, 6–4
2024	(France) Antoine Escoffier	(Spain) Àlex Martínez	6–3, 2–6, 6–3
2023	(Spain) Pablo Llamas Ruiz	(France) Antoine Escoffier	7–6^{(11–9)}, 7–6^{(7–5)}
2022	(France) Hugo Grenier	(France) Constant Lestienne	7–5, 6–3
2021	(France) Benjamin Bonzi	(Netherlands) Tim van Rijthoven	7–6^{(12–10)}, 3–6, 6–4
2020	Not held		
2019	(Spain) Nicola Kuhn	(Russia) Pavel Kotov	6–2, 7–6^{(7–4)}
2018	(France) Ugo Humbert	(Spain) Adrián Menéndez Maceiras	6–3, 6–4
2017	(Spain) Jaume Munar	(Australia) Alex De Minaur	6–3, 6–4
2016	(Italy) Luca Vanni	(Ukraine) Illya Marchenko	6–4, 3–6, 6–3
2015	(Russia) Evgeny Donskoy	(Switzerland) Marco Chiudinelli	7–6^{(7–2)}, 6–3
2014	(France) Adrian Mannarino	(Spain) Adrián Menéndez Maceiras	6–3, 6–0
2013	(Spain) Pablo Carreño	(France) Albano Olivetti	6–4, 7–6^{(7–2)}
2012	(Russia) Evgeny Donskoy	(France) Albano Olivetti	6–1, 7–6^{(13–11)}
2011	(Slovakia) Karol Beck	(France) Grégoire Burquier	6–4, 7–6^{(7–4)}
2010	(Spain) Daniel Gimeno Traver	(France) Adrian Mannarino	6–4, 7–6(2)
2009	(Spain) Feliciano López	(France) Adrian Mannarino	6–3, 6–4
2008	(Ukraine) Sergiy Stakhovsky	(Brazil) Thiago Alves	7–5, 7–6(4)
2007	(Spain) Fernando Verdasco	(Australia) Alun Jones	6–2, 6–4
2006	(Argentina) Juan Martín del Potro	(Germany) Benjamin Becker	6–4, 5–7, 6–4
2005	(Germany) Michael Berrer	(Chinese Taipei) Wang Yeu-tzuoo	7–5, 6–7(6), 6–1
2004	(France) Paul-Henri Mathieu	(France) Nicolas Mahut	6–7(4), 6–4, 6–4
2003	(Spain) Rafael Nadal	(Czech Republic) Tomáš Zíb	6–2, 7–6(1)
2002	(France) Olivier Mutis	(Spain) Fernando Verdasco	6–4, 6–2
2001	(Argentina) Juan Ignacio Chela	(Uzbekistan) Oleg Ogorodov	6–2, 6–3
2000	(Spain) Sergi Bruguera	(Netherlands) Jan Siemerink	5–7, 6–3, 6–0
1999	(France) Cyril Saulnier	(Spain) Sergi Bruguera	6–4, 7–5
1998	(Czech Republic) Radek Štěpánek	(Germany) Alex Rădulescu	7–5, 7–5
1997	(Spain) Jordi Burillo	(France) Nicolas Escudé	6–3, 2–1 retired
1996	(France) Jérôme Golmard	(Spain) Emilio Sánchez	6–4, 6–3
1995	(France) Rodolphe Gilbert	(Spain) Emilio Sánchez	7–6, 7–6
1994	(France) Rodolphe Gilbert	(Germany) Markus Zoecke	6–2, 6–4
1993	(Austria) Alex Antonitsch	(Spain) Jordi Burillo	6–3, 6–3
1992	(France) Guillaume Raoux	(Germany) Jörn Renzenbrink	7–6, 7–6
1991	(Spain) Javier Sánchez	(United States) Francisco Montana	6–3, 6–2
1990	(Spain) Emilio Sánchez	(Spain) Francisco Clavet	6–3, 2–6, 7–5
1989	(Spain) Sergio Casal	(Argentina) Martín Jaite	6–3, 6–4
1988	(Spain) José Clavet	(Spain) Francisco Clavet	6–3, 7–5
1987	(Paraguay) Víctor Pecci	(Paraguay) Hugo Chapacú	6–2, 6–1
1986	(Spain) José Clavet	(Spain) Roberto Sancha	6–4, 6–1

=== Men's doubles ===
Year	Champions	Runners-up	Score
2026	(Spain) Alejo Sánchez Quílez (Spain) Benjamín Winter López	(Turkey) Arda Azkara (Turkey) Yankı Erel	2–6, 7–6^{(7–2)}, [10–7]
2025	(Chile) Matías Soto (Bolivia) Federico Zeballos	(France) Arthur Reymond (France) Luca Sanchez	3–6, 7–6^{(7–5)}, [16–14]
2024	(France) Dan Added (France) Arthur Reymond	(Bulgaria) Alexander Donski (Portugal) Tiago Pereira	6–4, 6–3
2023	(France) Dan Added (France) Pierre-Hugues Herbert	(Philippines) Francis Alcantara (China) Sun Fajing	4–6, 6–3, [12–10]
2022	(Spain) Nicolás Álvarez Varona (Spain) Iñaki Montes de la Torre	(Zimbabwe) Benjamin Lock (Zimbabwe) Courtney John Lock	7–6^{(7–3)}, 6–3
2021	(United States) Robert Galloway (United States) Alex Lawson	(United States) JC Aragone (Colombia) Nicolás Barrientos	7–6^{(10–8)}, 6–4
2020	Not held		
2019	(Netherlands) Sander Arends (Netherlands) David Pel	(Brazil) Orlando Luz (Brazil) Felipe Meligeni Alves	6–4, 7–6^{(7–3)}
2018	(Spain) Andrés Artuñedo (Spain) David Pérez Sanz	(Argentina) Matías Franco Descotte (Portugal) João Monteiro	6–7^{(3–7)}, 6–3, [10–6]
2017	(Spain) Adrián Menéndez Maceiras (Ukraine) Sergiy Stakhovsky	(Spain) Roberto Ortega Olmedo (Spain) David Vega Hernández	4–6, 6–3, [10–7]
2016	(India) Purav Raja (India) Divij Sharan	(Spain) Quino Muñoz (Japan) Akira Santillan	6–3, 4–6, [10–8]
2015	(Russia) Alexander Kudryavtsev (Ukraine) Denys Molchanov	(Belarus) Alexander Bury (Sweden) Andreas Siljeström	6–2, 6–4
2014	(Russia) Victor Baluda (Russia) Alexander Kudryavtsev	(United Kingdom) Brydan Klein (Croatia) Nikola Mektić	6–2, 4–6, [10–3]
2013	(United Kingdom) Ken Skupski (United Kingdom) Neal Skupski	(Russia) Mikhail Elgin (Belarus) Uladzimir Ignatik	6–3, 6–7(4), [10-6]
2012	(Italy) Stefano Ianni (Romania) Florin Mergea	(Russia) Konstantin Kravchuk (Austria) Nikolaus Moser	6–2, 6–3
2011	(Sweden) Johan Brunström (Denmark) Frederik Nielsen	(France) Nicolas Mahut (Croatia) Lovro Zovko	6–2, 3–6, [10–6]
2010	(Brazil) Thiago Alves (Brazil) Franco Ferreiro	(United States) Brian Battistone (India) Harsh Mankad	6–2, 5–7, [10–8]
2009	(France) Nicolas Mahut (France) Édouard Roger-Vasselin	(Ukraine) Sergiy Stakhovsky (Croatia) Lovro Zovko	6–7(4), 6–3, 10–8
2008	(United Kingdom) Ross Hutchins (United States) Jim Thomas	(Czech Republic) Jaroslav Levinský (Slovakia) Filip Polášek	7–6(3), 3–6, 10–8
2007	(India) Rohan Bopanna (Pakistan) Aisam-ul-Haq Qureshi	(Switzerland) Michel Kratochvil (Luxembourg) Gilles Müller	7–6(8), 6–3
2006	(Australia) Paul Baccanello (Australia) Chris Guccione	(Sweden) Johan Landsberg (Sweden) Filip Prpic	6–3, 7–6(2)
2005	(Spain) Marcel Granollers (Spain) Álex López Morón	(Italy) Daniele Bracciali (Italy) Uros Vico	6–4, 6–2
2004	(Russia) Igor Kunitsyn (Belarus) Vladimir Voltchkov	(Spain) Daniel Muñoz de la Nava (Spain) Iván Navarro	3–6, 6–3, 6–2
2003	(Czech Republic) Ota Fukárek (United States) Tripp Phillips	(France) Jean-François Bachelot (Spain) Emilio Benfele Álvarez	6–4, 7–6(8)
2002	(Australia) Tim Crichton (Australia) Todd Perry	(Slovakia) Karol Beck (Netherlands) Sander Groen	5–7, 7–6(3), 6–4
2001	(South Africa) Wesley Moodie (South Africa) Shaun Rudman	(South Africa) Neville Godwin (South Africa) Marcos Ondruska	7–6(5), 6–3
2000	(Australia) Ashley Fisher (South Africa) Jason Weir-Smith	(Australia) Jordan Kerr (South Africa) Damien Roberts	7–6(5), 6–1
1999	(Switzerland) Roger Federer (Netherlands) Sander Groen	(Czech Republic) Ota Fukárek (Mexico) Alejandro Hernández	6–4, 7–6
1998	(Czech Republic) Radek Štěpánek (Czech Republic) Tomáš Zíb	(Spain) José Antonio Conde (Spain) Ruben Fernández Gil	6–3, 7–6
1997	(Portugal) Joao Cunha Silva (Portugal) Nuno Marques	(Spain) Juan Ignacio Carrasco (United States) Brian Eagle	6–7, 6–2, 6–4
1996	(Spain) Jordi Burillo (Spain) Emilio Sánchez	(Spain) José Antonio Conde (Portugal) Nuno Marques	6–4, 7–5
1995	(France) Rodolphe Gilbert (France) Guillaume Raoux	(Spain) Sergio Casal (Spain) Emilio Sánchez	6–4, 6–3
1994	(France) Rodolphe Gilbert (France) Stéphane Simian	(Spain) Sergio Casal (Spain) Emilio Sánchez	6–4, 3–6, 7–6
1993	(Spain) Juan Ignacio Carrasco (United Kingdom) Mark Petchey	(Venezuela) Maurice Ruah (The Bahamas) Roger Smith	6–2, 7–5
1992	(Netherlands) Mike van den Berg (Netherlands) Joost Wijnhoud	(Nigeria) Nduka Odizor (Argentina) Roberto Saad	7–6, 7–6
1991	(Spain) Francisco Clavet (Spain) Javier Sánchez	(Spain) Juan Carlos Báguena (Spain) José Clavet	7–6, 6–2
1990	(Spain) Fernando García Lleó (Spain) Jesús Manteca	(Spain) Francisco Clavet (Spain) Javier Sánchez	4–6, 6–3, 7–6
1989	(Spain) Sergio Casal (Spain) Emilio Sánchez	(Spain) Francisco Clavet (Spain) Javier Sánchez	7–6, 5–7, 6–4
1988	(Paraguay) Hugo Chapacú (Spain) Juan Antonio Rodríguez	(Spain) Francisco Clavet (Spain) José Clavet	6–4, 7–5
1987	(Spain) Aniceto Álvarez (Spain) Ernesto Vázquez	(Paraguay) Víctor Pecci (Paraguay) Hugo Chapacú	1–6, 6–3, 8–6
1986	(Spain) Roberto Sánchez (Spain) Fernando Triviño	(Spain) Francisco Clavet (Spain) Ángel Fuentetaja	6–4, 2–6, 6–3

=== Women's singles ===
Year	Champion	Runner-up	Score
2024	(France) Yasmine Mansouri	(Bulgaria) Lia Karatancheva	6–2, 6–7^{(5–7)}, 7–5
2023	Maria Bondarenko	Ekaterina Reyngold	6–7^{(4–7)}, 6–0, 6–0
2022	Mirra Andreeva	(Spain) Eva Guerrero Álvarez	6–4, 6–2
2020–21	Not held		
2019	(Netherlands) Arantxa Rus	(Bulgaria) Julia Terziyska	6–4, 6–1
2018	(Russia) Liudmila Samsonova	(Turkey) Başak Eraydın	6–2, 6–0
2017	(Spain) Paula Badosa Gibert	(Turkey) Ayla Aksu	6–2, 6–4
2016	(France) Jessika Ponchet	(Spain) Rocío de la Torre Sánchez	6–4, 6–2
2015	(Spain) Rocío de la Torre Sánchez	(France) Clothilde de Bernardi	6–4, 3–6, 6–4

=== Women's doubles ===
Year	Champions	Runners-up	Score
2024	(Bulgaria) Lia Karatancheva (Slovakia) Radka Zelníčková	(Australia) Alexandra Osborne (United States) Anna Rogers	2–6, 6–3, [10–3]
2023	(United States) Rasheeda McAdoo (Australia) Alexandra Osborne	(South Korea) Ku Yeon-woo (Latvia) Diāna Marcinkēviča	6–4, 6–3
2022	(Hong Kong) Eudice Chong (Hong Kong) Cody Wong	(Spain) Marta González Encinas (Mexico) María Fernanda Navarro	6–2, 4–6, [10–6]
2020–21	Not held		
2019	(Spain) Marina Bassols Ribera (China) Feng Shuo	(Australia) Alexandra Bozovic (Belarus) Shalimar Talbi	7–5, 7–6^{(7–4)}
2018	(Spain) Marina Bassols Ribera (Spain) Olga Parres Azcoitia	(Serbia) Tamara Čurović (Turkey) Başak Eraydın	7–5, 6–4
2017	(United States) Quinn Gleason (Brazil) Luisa Stefani	(Turkey) Ayla Aksu (Netherlands) Bibiane Schoofs	6–3, 6–2
2016	(Ecuador) Charlotte Römer (Germany) Sarah-Rebecca Sekulic	(France) Jessika Ponchet (Romania) Ioana Loredana Roșca	6–2, 7–6^{(7–4)}
2015	(Spain) Olga Parres Azcoitia (Italy) Camilla Rosatello	(Spain) Arabela Fernández Rabener (United Kingdom) Francesca Stephenson	6–1, 6–2
