= 2009 Aegean Tennis Cup – Doubles =

Doubles
- 2009 Aegean Tennis Cup

Final
- Champions: (Slovakia) Karol Beck (Czech Republic) Jaroslav Levinský
- Runners-up: (United States) Rajeev Ram (United States) Bobby Reynolds
- Score: 6–3, 6–3

Events
Singles	Doubles
← 2008 ·	Aegean Tennis Cup	· 2010 →

Karol Beck and Jaroslav Levinský won in the final 6–3, 6–3, against Rajeev Ram and Bobby Reynolds and they became the first champions of this tournament.

== Seeds ==
1. (South Africa) Rik de Voest / (Australia) Ashley Fisher (first round)
2. (Germany) Christopher Kas / (Netherlands) Rogier Wassen (first round)
3. (United States) Rajeev Ram / (United States) Bobby Reynolds (final)
4. (United States) Eric Butorac / (United States) Scott Lipsky (semifinals)

== Draw ==
=== Key ===
- Q = Qualifier
- WC = Wild card
- LL = Lucky loser
- Alt = Alternate
- SE = Special exempt
- PR = Protected ranking
- ITF = ITF entry
- JE = Junior exempt
- w/o = Walkover
- r = Retired
- d = Defaulted
- SR = Special ranking

=== Draw ===
First round
1	(South Africa) R de Voest (Australia) A Fisher	6^{3}	1
(India) R Bopanna (Israel) H Levy	7	6
(Slovakia) K Beck (Czech Republic) J Levinský	3	6	[10]
(Germany) M Kohlmann (Croatia) L Zovko	6	3	[6]
4	(United States) E Butorac (United States) S Lipsky	6	4	[10]
WC	(Israel) J Erlich (Israel) A Hadad	3	6	[7]
(France) É Roger-Vasselin (Ukraine) S Stakhovsky	6	6
(Germany) B Becker (South Africa) C Haggard	3	4
(Austria) P Oswald (Slovakia) I Zelenay	6	6
WC	(Germany) A-F Geourgoudas (Finland) H Kontinen	3	2
WC	(Greece) T Angelinos (India) S Devvarman	4	4
3	(United States) R Ram (United States) B Reynolds	6	6
(Germany) M Berrer (France) N Mahut	6	6
(Brazil) T Alves (United States) K Kim	2	2
(Israel) N Okun (Israel) D Sela	2	6	[10]
2	(Germany) C Kas (Netherlands) R Wassen	6	1	[8]

Quarterfinals
(India) R Bopanna (Israel) H Levy	6	3	[12]
(Slovakia) K Beck (Czech Republic) J Levinský	2	6	[14]
4	(United States) E Butorac (United States) S Lipsky	6	3	[10]
(France) É Roger-Vasselin (Ukraine) S Stakhovsky	4	6	[3]
(Austria) P Oswald (Slovakia) I Zelenay	7	6^{4}	[7]
3	(United States) R Ram (United States) B Reynolds	6^{2}	7	[10]
(Germany) M Berrer (France) N Mahut	6	6
(Israel) N Okun (Israel) D Sela	2	3

Semifinals
(Slovakia) K Beck (Czech Republic) J Levinský	6	7
4	(United States) E Butorac (United States) S Lipsky	4	6^{5}
3	(United States) R Ram (United States) B Reynolds	6	6^{2}	[10]
(Germany) M Berrer (France) N Mahut	3	7	[8]

Finals
(Slovakia) K Beck (Czech Republic) J Levinský	6	6
3	(United States) R Ram (United States) B Reynolds	3	3
