= 2009 Aegean Tennis Cup – Singles =

Singles
- 2009 Aegean Tennis Cup

Final
- Champion: (Germany) Benjamin Becker
- Runner-up: (Germany) Simon Stadler
- Score: 7–5, 6–3

Events
Singles	Doubles
← 2008 ·	Aegean Tennis Cup	· 2010 →

Benjamin Becker defeated his compatriot Simon Stadler in the final and won the title.

== Seeds ==
1. (Israel) Dudi Sela (quarterfinals)
2. (United States) Bobby Reynolds (first round)
3. (United States) Kevin Kim (second round)
4. (Germany) Michael Berrer (first round)
5. (Ukraine) Sergiy Stakhovsky (first round)
6. (Brazil) Thiago Alves (semifinals)
7. (Germany) Benjamin Becker (champion)
8. (France) Nicolas Mahut (first round)

== Draw ==
=== Key ===
- Q = Qualifier
- WC = Wild card
- LL = Lucky loser
- Alt = Alternate
- SE = Special exempt
- PR = Protected ranking
- ITF = ITF entry
- JE = Junior exempt
- w/o = Walkover
- r = Retired
- d = Defaulted
- SR = Special ranking

=== Final four ===
Semifinals
(India) Prakash Amritraj	1	2^{r}
7	(Germany) Benjamin Becker	6	4
6	(Brazil) Thiago Alves	6	3	5
(Germany) Simon Stadler	4	6	7

Final
7	(Germany) Benjamin Becker	7	6
(Germany) Simon Stadler	5	3

=== Top half ===
First round
1	(Israel) D Sela	6	6
WC	(Germany) A-F Georgoudas	1	0
(Sweden) J Johansson	3	6^{5}
(United States) A Delic	6	7
(India) P Amritraj	6	6
Q	(Canada) P-L Duclos	4	0
(Russia) M Elgin	3	6	6
8	(France) N Mahut	6	4	4
3	(United States) K Kim	6	7
Q	(Israel) N Okun	4	6^{9}
(Australia) C Guccione	4	6^{4}
(Germany) B Dorsch	6	7
(France) É Roger-Vasselin	6	6
(India) S Devvarman	3	2
WC	(Bulgaria) G Dimitrov	2	3
7	(Germany) B Becker	6	6

Second round
1	(Israel) D Sela	6	4	6
(United States) A Delic	3	6	3
(India) P Amritraj	4	6	6
(Russia) M Elgin	6	2	3
3	(United States) K Kim	2	3
(Germany) B Dorsch	6	6
(France) É Roger-Vasselin	4	6	4
7	(Germany) B Becker	6	4	6

Quarterfinals
1	(Israel) D Sela	4	6	3
(India) P Amritraj	6	4	6
(Germany) B Dorsch	6	3	4
7	(Germany) B Becker	3	6	6

Semifinals
(India) P Amritraj	1	2^{r}
7	(Germany) B Becker	6	4

=== Bottom half ===
First round
6	(Brazil) T Alves	7	6
Q	(Germany) M Kohlmann	6^{3}	4
(South Africa) R de Voest	6	6
(Slovakia) K Beck	3	3
(Czech Republic) P Šnobel	6	6
(Slovenia) G Žemlja	3	3
(United States) B Evans	6	3	7
4	(Germany) M Berrer	3	6	6^{5}
5	(Ukraine) S Stakhovsky	4	4
(United States) R Ram	6	6
WC	(Finland) H Kontinen	4	4
(Germany) S Stadler	6	6
Q	(India) R Bopanna	6	6
WC	(Greece) T Angelinos	1	2
(United Kingdom) A Bogdanovic	4	6	6
2	(United States) B Reynolds	6	3	4

Second round
6	(Brazil) T Alves	6	7
(South Africa) R de Voest	4	6^{4}
(Czech Republic) P Šnobel	6	3	6^{2}
(United States) B Evans	2	6	7
(United States) R Ram	6^{5}	6^{5}
(Germany) S Stadler	7	7
Q	(India) R Bopanna	2	7	7
(United Kingdom) A Bogdanovic	6	6^{5}	5

Quarterfinals
6	(Brazil) T Alves	6	7
(United States) B Evans	2	6^{4}
(Germany) S Stadler	7	6
Q	(India) R Bopanna	5	2

Semifinals
6	(Brazil) T Alves	6	3	5
(Germany) S Stadler	4	6	7
