= 2010 Ixian Grand Aegean Tennis Cup – Singles =

Singles
- 2010 Ixian Grand Aegean Tennis Cup

Final
- Champion: (Israel) Dudi Sela
- Runner-up: (Germany) Rainer Schüttler
- Score: 7–6(3), 6–3

Events
Singles	Doubles
← 2009 ·	Ixian Grand Aegean Tennis Cup	· 2011 →

Benjamin Becker was the defending champion, however he chose to compete in Rome instead.
Dudi Sela defeated Rainer Schüttler in the final. He defeated him 7–6(3), 6–3.

== Seeds ==
1. (Switzerland) Marco Chiudinelli (first round)
2. (Israel) Dudi Sela (champion)
3. (Germany) Rainer Schüttler (final)
4. (Chinese Taipei) Lu Yen-hsun (semifinals)
5. (Jamaica) Dustin Brown (second round)
6. (Israel) Harel Levy (first round)
7. (Switzerland) Stéphane Bohli (withdrew)
8. (Germany) Björn Phau (first round)
9. (United Kingdom) Alex Bogdanovic (first round)

== Draw ==
=== Key ===
- Q = Qualifier
- WC = Wild card
- LL = Lucky loser
- Alt = Alternate
- SE = Special exempt
- PR = Protected ranking
- ITF = ITF entry
- JE = Junior exempt
- w/o = Walkover
- r = Retired
- d = Defaulted
- SR = Special ranking

=== Finals ===
Semifinals
(Netherlands) Igor Sijsling	7	2	4
3	(Germany) Rainer Schüttler	6^{4}	6	6
4	(Chinese Taipei) Lu Yen-hsun	2	6	4
2	(Israel) Dudi Sela	6	3	6

Final
3	(Germany) Rainer Schüttler	6^{3}	3
2	(Israel) Dudi Sela	7	6

=== Top half ===
First round
1	(Switzerland) M Chiudinelli	2	6	6^{5}
(New Zealand) D King-Turner	6	3	7
(South Africa) R de Voest	6	6^{5}	3
(France) N Mahut	4	7	6
(Russia) K Kravchuk	4	3
(Netherlands) I Sijsling	6	6
Q	(Slovakia) A Martin	5	6	6
6	(Israel) H Levy	7	3	0
3	(Germany) R Schüttler	4	6	6
(Lithuania) R Berankis	6	4	1
Q	(Latvia) A Juška	7	7
LL	(Sweden) F Prpic	5	5
(France) A Mannarino	6	6
WC	(Greece) P Gemouchidis	3	2
(Finland) H Kontinen	6	6
8	(Germany) B Phau	3	1

Second round
(New Zealand) D King-Turner	1	4
(France) N Mahut	6	6
(Netherlands) I Sijsling	6	6
Q	(Slovakia) A Martin	4	4
3	(Germany) R Schüttler	6	6
Q	(Latvia) A Juška	2	1
(France) A Mannarino	4	1
(Finland) H Kontinen	6	6

Quarterfinals
(France) N Mahut	3	6	6^{6}
(Netherlands) I Sijsling	6	4	7
3	(Germany) R Schüttler	6	6
(Finland) H Kontinen	2	4

Semifinals
(Netherlands) I Sijsling	7	2	4
3	(Germany) R Schüttler	6^{4}	6	6

=== Bottom half ===
First round
5	(Jamaica) D Brown	6	6
(Netherlands) R Haase	1	4
WC	(Greece) K Economidis	4	2
(Germany) S Stadler	6	6
(Belgium) R Bemelmans	7	6^{6}	6^{2}
Q	(Russia) M Ledovskikh	6^{4}	7	7
Q	(Germany) D Gremelmayr	6	5	3
4	(Chinese Taipei) Y-h Lu	4	7	6
9	(United Kingdom) A Bogdanovic	3	1
(Luxembourg) G Müller	6	6
(Australia) S Groth	6	3	6
(Switzerland) M Lammer	4	6	2
(Netherlands) R Sluiter	7	7
WC	(Greece) T Angelinos	6^{7}	5
WC	(Greece) A Jakupovic	4	3
2	(Israel) D Sela	6	6

Second round
5	(Jamaica) D Brown	3	6	3
(Germany) S Stadler	6	2	6
Q	(Russia) M Ledovskikh	1	1
4	(Chinese Taipei) Y-h Lu	6	6
(Luxembourg) G Müller	7	6
(Australia) S Groth	5	3
(Netherlands) R Sluiter	4	6^{3}
2	(Israel) D Sela	6	7

Quarterfinals
(Germany) S Stadler	5	1
4	(Chinese Taipei) Y-h Lu	7	6
(Luxembourg) G Müller	4	2
2	(Israel) D Sela	6	6

Semifinals
4	(Chinese Taipei) Y-h Lu	2	6	4
2	(Israel) D Sela	6	3	6
