= 2017 Trofeo Città di Brescia – Doubles =

Doubles
- 2017 Trofeo Città di Brescia

Final
- Champions: (Netherlands) Sander Arends (Belgium) Sander Gillé
- Runners-up: (Switzerland) Luca Margaroli (Austria) Tristan-Samuel Weissborn
- Score: 6–2, 6–3

Events
| Singles | Doubles |
| ← 2016 · | Trofeo Città di Brescia | · 2018 → |

Mikhail Elgin and Alexander Kudryavtsev were the defending champions but chose not to defend their title.

Sander Arends and Sander Gillé won the title after defeating Luca Margaroli and Tristan-Samuel Weissborn 6–2, 6–3 in the final.

== Seeds ==
1. (Netherlands) Sander Arends / (Belgium) Sander Gillé (champions)
2. (Switzerland) Luca Margaroli / (Austria) Tristan-Samuel Weissborn (final)
3. (Poland) Tomasz Bednarek / (Netherlands) David Pel (semifinals)
4. (Belarus) Aliaksandr Bury / (Ukraine) Volodymyr Uzhylovskyi (quarterfinals)

== Draw ==
=== Key ===
- Q = Qualifier
- WC = Wild card
- LL = Lucky loser
- Alt = Alternate
- SE = Special exempt
- PR = Protected ranking
- ITF = ITF entry
- JE = Junior exempt
- w/o = Walkover
- r = Retired
- d = Defaulted
- SR = Special ranking

First round
1 | (Netherlands) S Arends (Belgium) S Gillé | 6 | 6
WC | (Italy) Luca Cominassi (Italy) Andrea Uberti | 1 | 2
(Italy) A Bega (Croatia) V Galović | 4 | 6^{4}
(Italy) F Baldi (Italy) A Pellegrino | 6 | 7^{7}
4 | (Belarus) A Bury (Ukraine) V Uzhylovskyi | 6 | 7^{8}
PR | (Netherlands) I Sijsling (Netherlands) M Vervoort | 1 | 6^{6}
WC | (Italy) E Dalla Valle (Italy) G Fonio | 2 | 4
(Italy) A Motti (Italy) S Travaglia | 6 | 6
(Italy) Davide Pontoglio (Italy) G Ricca | 6 | 6
WC | (Italy) Marco Facconi (Italy) Pietro Mugelli | 2 | 4
(Bosnia and Herzegovina) M Bašić (Russia) D Matsukevich | 6^{3} | 4
3 | (Poland) T Bednarek (Netherlands) D Pel | 7^{7} | 6
(Italy) L Sonego (Italy) A Vavassori | 6^{4} | 2
PR | (Uzbekistan) F Dustov (Italy) Lorenzo Frigerio | 7^{7} | 6
(Lithuania) L Grigelis (Sweden) A Siljeström | 6^{5} | 2
2 | (Switzerland) L Margaroli (Austria) T-S Weissborn | 7^{7} | 6

Quarterfinals
1 | (Netherlands) S Arends (Belgium) S Gillé | 4 | 6 | [11]
(Italy) F Baldi (Italy) A Pellegrino | 6 | 4 | [9]
4 | (Belarus) A Bury (Ukraine) V Uzhylovskyi | 6^{9} | 6 | [5]
(Italy) A Motti (Italy) S Travaglia | 7^{11} | 4 | [10]
(Italy) D Pontoglio (Italy) G Ricca | 1 | 6^{2}
3 | (Poland) T Bednarek (Netherlands) D Pel | 6 | 7^{7}
PR | (Uzbekistan) F Dustov (Italy) L Frigerio | 6 | 3 | [8]
2 | (Switzerland) L Margaroli (Austria) T-S Weissborn | 3 | 6 | [10]

Semifinals
1 | (Netherlands) S Arends (Belgium) S Gillé | 6 | 6
(Italy) A Motti (Italy) S Travaglia | 2 | 4
3 | (Poland) T Bednarek (Netherlands) D Pel | 7^{7} | 5 | [12]
2 | (Switzerland) L Margaroli (Austria) T-S Weissborn | 6^{2} | 7 | [14]

Final
1 | (Netherlands) S Arends (Belgium) S Gillé | 6 | 6
2 | (Switzerland) L Margaroli (Austria) T-S Weissborn | 2 | 3
