= 2014 Trofeo Città di Brescia – Singles =

Singles
- 2014 Trofeo Città di Brescia

Final
- Champion: (Ukraine) Illya Marchenko
- Runner-up: (Uzbekistan) Farrukh Dustov
- Score: 6–4, 5–7, 6–2

Events
Singles	Doubles
Trofeo Città di Brescia	· 2015 →

This was the first edition of the tournament.

Illya Marchenko won the title, defeating Farrukh Dustov in the final, 6–4, 5–7, 6–2.

== Seeds ==
1. (Netherlands) Igor Sijsling (first round)
2. (Germany) Dustin Brown (semifinals)
3. (Slovenia) Blaž Kavčič (second round)
4. (Serbia) Filip Krajinović (second round)
5. (Serbia) Viktor Troicki (quarterfinals)
6. (Spain) Daniel Gimeno-Traver (first round)
7. (Germany) Andreas Beck (first round, withdrew)
8. (Chinese Taipei) Jimmy Wang (first round)

== Draw ==
=== Key ===
- Q = Qualifier
- WC = Wild card
- LL = Lucky loser
- Alt = Alternate
- SE = Special exempt
- PR = Protected ranking
- ITF = ITF entry
- JE = Junior exempt
- w/o = Walkover
- r = Retired
- d = Defaulted
- SR = Special ranking

=== Finals ===
Semifinals
(Germany) Michael Berrer	6^{5}	6	3
(Uzbekistan) Farrukh Dustov	7^{7}	4	6
(Ukraine) Illya Marchenko	6	6
2	(Germany) Dustin Brown	1	4

Finals
(Uzbekistan) Farrukh Dustov	4	7	2
(Ukraine) Illya Marchenko	6	5	6

=== Top half ===
First round
1	(Netherlands) I Sijsling	7	3	4
(Germany) M Berrer	5	6	6
WC	(Italy) F Baldi	5	6	6
WC	(Italy) G Mager	7	4	4
(Czech Republic) J Hernych	6	6
Q	(Russia) K Kravchuk	4	4
WC	(Italy) S Caruso	6	4	7^{7}
8	(Chinese Taipei) J Wang	1	6	6^{5}
3	(Slovenia) B Kavčič	4	6	6^{5}
(Uzbekistan) F Dustov	6	3	7^{7}
Q	(Spain) A Artuñedo	6	6
(Italy) S Travaglia	4	2
WC	(Italy) Pietro Licciardi	5	6^{4}
(Switzerland) Y Marti	7	7^{7}
Q	(Russia) D Matsukevich	w/o
7	(Germany) A Beck

Second round
(Germany) M Berrer	6	6
WC	(Italy) F Baldi	4	3
(Czech Republic) J Hernych	6	3	6
WC	(Italy) S Caruso	3	6	3
(Uzbekistan) F Dustov	6	6
(Spain) A Artuñedo	3	3
(Switzerland) Y Marti	6	3	2
Q	(Russia) D Matsukevich	3	6	6

Quarterfinals
(Germany) M Berrer	7^{7}	6
(Czech Republic) J Hernych	6^{3}	4
(Uzbekistan) F Dustov	6	7^{7}
Q	(Russia) D Matsukevich	3	6^{3}

Semifinals
(Germany) M Berrer	6^{5}	6	3
(Uzbekistan) F Dustov	7^{7}	4	6

=== Bottom half ===
First round
6/Alt	(Spain) D Gimeno-Traver	1	6^{3}
(Croatia) M Delić	6	7^{7}
(Italy) A Arnaboldi	4	6	3
(United States) A Krajicek	6	3	6
(Ukraine) I Marchenko	7^{7}	6
(Slovakia) M Mečíř Jr.	6^{2}	4
(Italy) L Vanni	6^{5}	7	5
4	(Serbia) F Krajinović	7^{7}	6^{5}	7
5	(Serbia) V Troicki	6	6
(Romania) A Ungur	1	4
(Romania) M Copil	6	7^{7}
PR	(Ukraine) S Bubka	0	6^{4}
(Belarus) U Ignatik	6	6
(Ukraine) D Molchanov	2	2
Q	(Bosnia and Herzegovina) M Bašić	7^{7}	3	6^{9}
2	(Germany) D Brown	6^{5}	6	7^{11}

Second round
(Croatia) M Delić	6^{3}	6^{2}
(United States) A Krajicek	7^{7}	7^{7}
(Ukraine) I Marchenko	4	6	6
4	(Serbia) F Krajinović	6	3	4
5	(Serbia) V Troicki	6	6
(Romania) M Copil	3	4
(Belarus) U Ignatik	6^{7}	4
2	(Germany) D Brown	7^{9}	6

Quarterfinals
(United States) A Krajicek	5	3
(Ukraine) I Marchenko	7	6
5	(Serbia) V Troicki	6^{4}	7^{7}	6^{5}
2	(Germany) D Brown	7^{7}	6^{5}	7^{7}

Semifinals
(Ukraine) I Marchenko	6	6
2	(Germany) D Brown	1	4
