= 2016 Trofeo Città di Brescia – Singles =

Singles
- 2016 Trofeo Città di Brescia

Final
- Champion: (Italy) Luca Vanni
- Runner-up: (Lithuania) Laurynas Grigelis
- Score: 6–7^{(5–7)}, 6–4, 7–6^{(10–8)}

Events
Singles	Doubles
← 2015 ·	Trofeo Città di Brescia	· 2017 →

Igor Sijsling was the defending champion but chose not to defend his title.

Luca Vanni won the title after defeating Laurynas Grigelis 6–7^{(5–7)}, 6–4, 7–6^{(10–8)} in the final.

== Seeds ==
1. (Slovakia) Lukáš Lacko (semifinals)
2. (Czech Republic) Lukáš Rosol (withdrew)
3. (Switzerland) Marco Chiudinelli (second round)
4. (Russia) Evgeny Donskoy (first round)
5. (Argentina) Leonardo Mayer (second round)
6. (Spain) Enrique López-Pérez (first round)
7. (Russia) Alexander Kudryavtsev (second round)
8. (Serbia) Marko Tepavac (first round)

== Draw ==
=== Key ===
- Q = Qualifier
- WC = Wild card
- LL = Lucky loser
- Alt = Alternate
- SE = Special exempt
- PR = Protected ranking
- ITF = ITF entry
- JE = Junior exempt
- w/o = Walkover
- r = Retired
- d = Defaulted
- SR = Special ranking

=== Finals ===
Semifinals
1	(Slovakia) Lukáš Lacko	6^{4}	4
(Italy) Luca Vanni	7^{7}	6
(Italy) Salvatore Caruso	4	4
LL	(Lithuania) Laurynas Grigelis	6	6

Final
(Italy) Luca Vanni	6^{5}	6	7^{10}
LL	(Lithuania) Laurynas Grigelis	7^{7}	4	6^{8}

=== Top half ===
First round
1	(Slovakia) L Lacko	6	6
Q	(Germany) Lukas Rüpke	2	2
WC	(Italy) M Berrettini	6	7^{7}
(Italy) L Sonego	4	6^{5}
WC	(Italy) A Vavassori	3	4
(Canada) F Dancevic	6	6
SE	(Germany) K Krawietz	6	6
6	(Spain) E López-Pérez	4	4
4	(Russia) E Donskoy	4	6	3
PR	(Slovenia) B Kavčič	6	4	6
WC	(Italy) S Travaglia	5	3
(Italy) L Vanni	7	6
(Greece) S Tsitsipas	2	1
WC	(Spain) T Robredo	6	6
(Bosnia and Herzegovina) A Šetkić	4	6^{7}
7	(Russia) A Kudryavtsev	6	7^{9}

Second round
1	(Slovakia) L Lacko	6^{4}	7^{7}	6
WC	(Italy) M Berrettini	7^{7}	6^{2}	4
(Canada) F Dancevic	6	3	7^{11}
SE	(Germany) K Krawietz	3	6	6^{9}
PR	(Slovenia) B Kavčič	3	6	6^{4}
(Italy) L Vanni	6	4	7^{7}
WC	(Spain) T Robredo	7	7
7	(Russia) A Kudryavtsev	5	5

Quarterfinals
1	(Slovakia) L Lacko	6	6
(Canada) F Dancevic	4	3
(Italy) L Vanni	5	7^{9}	7^{7}
WC	(Spain) T Robredo	7	6^{7}	6^{5}

Semifinals
1	(Slovakia) L Lacko	6^{4}	4
(Italy) L Vanni	7^{7}	6

=== Bottom half ===
First round
8	(Serbia) M Tepavac	5	3
(India) R Ramanathan	7	6
(Italy) S Caruso	6	4	6
(Serbia) M Zekić	2	6	3
Q	(Czech Republic) Petr Michnev	4	1
(Czech Republic) Z Kolář	6	6
(Italy) L Giustino	3	5
3	(Switzerland) M Chiudinelli	6	7
5	(Argentina) L Mayer	6	6
(Croatia) F Škugor	3	4
LL	(Lithuania) L Grigelis	3	6	7^{7}
(Italy) A Arnaboldi	6	3	6^{2}
LL	(Italy) G Mager	6^{2}	6^{3}
Q	(Czech Republic) Marek Jaloviec	7^{7}	7^{7}
(Japan) A Santillan	3	6^{4}
Q	(Belarus) E Gerasimov	6	7^{7}

Second round
(India) R Ramanathan	4	5
(Italy) S Caruso	6	7
(Czech Republic) Z Kolář	6	6
3	(Switzerland) M Chiudinelli	4	4
5	(Argentina) L Mayer	6	6^{3}	5
LL	(Lithuania) L Grigelis	3	7^{7}	7
Q	(Czech Republic) M Jaloviec	6^{6}	5
Q	(Belarus) E Gerasimov	7^{8}	7

Quarterfinals
(Italy) S Caruso	6	6
(Czech Republic) Z Kolář	4	2
LL	(Lithuania) L Grigelis	0
Q	(Belarus) E Gerasimov	1^{r}

Semifinals
(Italy) S Caruso	4	4
LL	(Lithuania) L Grigelis	6	6
