= 2016 Trofeo Città di Brescia – Doubles =

Doubles
- 2016 Trofeo Città di Brescia

Final
- Champions: (Russia) Mikhail Elgin (Russia) Alexander Kudryavtsev
- Runners-up: (Netherlands) Wesley Koolhof (Netherlands) Matwé Middelkoop
- Score: 7–6^{(7–4)}, 6–3

Events
Singles	Doubles
← 2015 ·	Trofeo Città di Brescia	· 2017 →

Ilija Bozoljac and Igor Zelenay were the defending champions but chose not to defend their title.

Mikhail Elgin and Alexander Kudryavtsev won the title after defeating Wesley Koolhof and Matwé Middelkoop 7–6^{(7–4)}, 6–3 in the final.

== Seeds ==
1. (Netherlands) Wesley Koolhof / (Netherlands) Matwé Middelkoop (final)
2. (India) Purav Raja / (India) Divij Sharan (withdrew)
3. (Sweden) Johan Brunström / (Sweden) Andreas Siljeström (first round)
4. (United States) James Cerretani / (Austria) Philipp Oswald (semifinals)

== Draw ==
=== Key ===
- Q = Qualifier
- WC = Wild card
- LL = Lucky loser
- Alt = Alternate
- SE = Special exempt
- PR = Protected ranking
- ITF = ITF entry
- JE = Junior exempt
- w/o = Walkover
- r = Retired
- d = Defaulted
- SR = Special ranking

First round
1	(Netherlands) W Koolhof (Netherlands) M Middelkoop	6	6
WC	(Italy) L Vanni (Italy) A Vavassori	2	3
WC	(Italy) L Giustino (Greece) S Tsitsipas	6	3	[8]
(Czech Republic) R Jebavý (Croatia) A Sančić	1	6	[10]
4	(United States) J Cerretani (Austria) P Oswald	6	7^{7}
(Croatia) N Mektić (Croatia) F Škugor	4	6^{3}
(Croatia) M Draganja (United Kingdom) N Skupski	6	6
(Italy) R Ghedin (Croatia) D Marcan	3	4
WC	(Kazakhstan) A Golubev (Bosnia and Herzegovina) A Šetkić	5	5
(Austria) M Neuchrist (Austria) T-S Weissborn	7	7
(Netherlands) S Arends (Poland) M Kowalczyk	7^{8}	7^{7}
3	(Sweden) J Brunström (Sweden) A Siljeström	6^{6}	6^{1}
(Poland) T Bednarek (Australia) R Junaid	1	3
(Russia) M Elgin (Russia) A Kudryavtsev	6	6
(Italy) A Motti (Belgium) J Vliegen	w/o
2	(India) P Raja (India) D Sharan

Quarterfinals
1	(Netherlands) W Koolhof (Netherlands) M Middelkoop	7^{7}	6
(Czech Republic) R Jebavý (Croatia) A Sančić	6^{2}	2
4	(United States) J Cerretani (Austria) P Oswald	6	6
(Croatia) M Draganja (United Kingdom) N Skupski	4	2
(Austria) M Neuchrist (Austria) T-S Weissborn	2	6	[15]
(Netherlands) S Arends (Poland) M Kowalczyk	6	4	[13]
(Russia) M Elgin (Russia) A Kudryavtsev	6	6
(Italy) A Motti (Belgium) J Vliegen	2	4

Semifinals
1	(Netherlands) W Koolhof (Netherlands) M Middelkoop	6	6
4	(United States) J Cerretani (Austria) P Oswald	1	4
(Austria) M Neuchrist (Austria) T-S Weissborn	3	6^{5}
(Russia) M Elgin (Russia) A Kudryavtsev	6	7^{7}

Final
1	(Netherlands) W Koolhof (Netherlands) M Middelkoop	6^{4}	3
(Russia) M Elgin (Russia) A Kudryavtsev	7^{7}	6
