= 2010 Ixian Grand Aegean Tennis Cup – Doubles =

Doubles
- 2010 Ixian Grand Aegean Tennis Cup

Final
- Champions: (Jamaica) Dustin Brown (Germany) Simon Stadler
- Runners-up: (United Kingdom) Jonathan Marray (United Kingdom) Jamie Murray
- Score: 7-6(4), 6-7(4), [10-7]

Events
Singles	Doubles
- Ixian Grand Aegean Tennis Cup

Karol Beck and Jaroslav Levinský were the defending champions; however, Beck chose to compete in Ostrava instead and Levinský chose not to compete this year.
Dustin Brown and Simon Stadler won in the final 7-6(4), 6-7(4), [10-7] against Jonathan Marray and Jamie Murray.

== Seeds ==
1. (United Kingdom) Jonathan Marray / (United Kingdom) Jamie Murray (final)
2. (Thailand) Sanchai Ratiwatana / (Thailand) Sonchat Ratiwatana (semifinals)
3. (Israel) Jonathan Erlich / (Israel) Harel Levy (first round)
4. (South Africa) Rik de Voest / (Chinese Taipei) Lu Yen-hsun (semifinals)

== Draw ==
Key

- Q = Qualifier
- WC = Wild card
- LL = Lucky loser
- Alt = Alternate
- ITF = ITF entry
- PR = Protected ranking
- SR = Special ranking
- SE = Special exempt
- JE = Junior exempt
- JR = Junior Accelerator Programme entrant
- CO = College Accelerator Programme entrant
- NG = Next Gen Accelerator Program entrant
- w/o = Walkover
- r = Retired
- d = Defaulted

=== Draw ===
First round
1	(United Kingdom) J Marray (United Kingdom) J Murray	6	6
WC	(Greece) C Kapogiannis (Greece) G Loucareas	3	2
(Australia) S Groth (New Zealand) D King-Turner	6	6
(Latvia) A Juška (Russia) M Ledovskikh	4	2
4	(South Africa) R de Voest (Chinese Taipei) Y-h Lu	6	6
(Switzerland) M Lammer (Sweden) F Prpic	1	0
WC	(Greece) T Angelinos (Greece) A Jakupovic	2	2
(Belgium) R Bemelmans (Finland) H Kontinen	6	6
(France) N Mahut (France) A Mannarino	7	6
(Slovakia) A Martin (Slovakia) M Mečíř Jr.	5	4
(Jamaica) D Brown (Germany) S Stadler	7	4	[10]
3	(Israel) J Erlich (Israel) H Levy	6^{4}	6	[7]
(Netherlands) R Haase (Netherlands) I Sijsling	6	6
(Luxembourg) G Müller (Croatia) L Zovko	3	1
WC	(Greece) K Economidis (Greece) P Gemouchidis	3	0
2	(Thailand) Sa Ratiwatana (Thailand) So Ratiwatana	6	6

Quarterfinals
1	(United Kingdom) J Marray (United Kingdom) J Murray	6	3	[13]
(Australia) S Groth (New Zealand) D King-Turner	0	6	[11]
4	(South Africa) R de Voest (Chinese Taipei) Y-h Lu	6	6
(Belgium) R Bemelmans (Finland) H Kontinen	3	4
(France) N Mahut (France) A Mannarino	5	6	[6]
(Jamaica) D Brown (Germany) S Stadler	7	3	[10]
(Netherlands) R Haase (Netherlands) I Sijsling	3	4
2	(Thailand) Sa Ratiwatana (Thailand) So Ratiwatana	6	6

Semifinals
1	(United Kingdom) J Marray (United Kingdom) J Murray	7	6
4	(South Africa) R de Voest (Chinese Taipei) Y-h Lu	6^{3}	4
(Jamaica) D Brown (Germany) S Stadler	6	3	[11]
2	(Thailand) Sa Ratiwatana (Thailand) So Ratiwatana	4	6	[9]

Finals
1	(United Kingdom) J Marray (United Kingdom) J Murray	6^{4}	7	[4]
(Jamaica) D Brown (Germany) S Stadler	7	6	[10]
