= 2014 Trofeo Città di Brescia – Doubles =

Doubles
- 2014 Trofeo Città di Brescia

Final
- Champion: (Ukraine) Illya Marchenko (Ukraine) Denys Molchanov
- Runner-up: (Czech Republic) Roman Jebavý (Poland) Błażej Koniusz
- Score: 7–6^{(7–4)}, 6–3

Events
Singles	Doubles
Trofeo Città di Brescia	· 2015 →

This was the first edition of the tournament.

Illya Marchenko and Denys Molchanov won the title, defeating Roman Jebavý and Błażej Koniusz in the final, 7–6^{(7–4)}, 6–3.

== Seeds ==
1. (United States) Austin Krajicek / (United States) Nicholas Monroe (first round)
2. (Germany) Frank Moser / (Germany) Alexander Satschko (quarterfinals)
3. (Poland) Mateusz Kowalczyk / (Croatia) Franko Škugor (first round)
4. (Australia) Rameez Junaid / (Slovakia) Igor Zelenay (first round)

== Draw ==
=== Key ===
- Q = Qualifier
- WC = Wild card
- LL = Lucky loser
- Alt = Alternate
- SE = Special exempt
- PR = Protected ranking
- ITF = ITF entry
- JE = Junior exempt
- w/o = Walkover
- r = Retired
- d = Defaulted
- SR = Special ranking

=== Draw ===
First round
1	(United States) A Krajicek (United States) N Monroe	6^{4}	6^{6}
(Ukraine) S Bubka (Russia) K Kravchuk	7^{7}	7^{8}
(France) O Charroin (Italy) R Ghedin	7^{7}	6
(Uzbekistan) F Dustov (Italy) A Motti	6^{0}	4
3	(Poland) M Kowalczyk (Croatia) F Škugor	6	4	[5]
(Ukraine) I Marchenko (Ukraine) D Molchanov	3	6	[10]
WC	(Italy) Francesco Borgo (Italy) Lorenzo Frigerio	5	5
WC	(Italy) S Travaglia (Italy) Matteo Volante	7	7
(Republic of Ireland) J Cluskey (Serbia) G Tošić	6	6
WC	(Spain) A Artuñedo (Spain) D Gimeno-Traver	3	2
(Czech Republic) R Jebavý (Poland) B Koniusz	6	7^{7}
4	(Australia) R Junaid (Slovakia) I Zelenay	4	6^{1}
(Bosnia and Herzegovina) T Brkić (Croatia) M Delić	7^{7}	3	[4]
(Germany) D Brown (Netherlands) W Koolhof	6^{5}	6	[10]
(Italy) A Arnaboldi (Germany) C Grassi	7^{7}	4	[7]
2	(Germany) F Moser (Germany) A Satschko	6^{4}	6	[10]

Quarterfinals
(Ukraine) S Bubka (Russia) K Kravchuk	5	7^{7}	[7]
(France) O Charroin (Italy) R Ghedin	7	6^{5}	[10]
(Ukraine) I Marchenko (Ukraine) D Molchanov	6	7
WC	(Italy) S Travaglia (Italy) M Volante	3	5
(Republic of Ireland) J Cluskey (Serbia) G Tošić	2	6^{3}
(Czech Republic) R Jebavý (Poland) B Koniusz	6	7^{7}
(Germany) D Brown (Netherlands) W Koolhof	7^{7}	6
2	(Germany) F Moser (Germany) A Satschko	6^{1}	3

Semifinals
(France) O Charroin (Italy) R Ghedin	4	2
(Ukraine) I Marchenko (Ukraine) D Molchanov	6	6
(Czech Republic) R Jebavý (Poland) B Koniusz	6	3	[10]
(Germany) D Brown (Netherlands) W Koolhof	4	6	[7]

Final
(Ukraine) I Marchenko (Ukraine) D Molchanov	7^{7}	6
(Czech Republic) R Jebavý (Poland) B Koniusz	6^{4}	3
