= 2010 Ixian Grand Aegean Tennis Cup =

- Category: ATP Challenger Tour, Tretorn SERIE+
- Draw: 32S/32Q/16D
- Prize money: €85,000+H
- Surface: Hard
- Location: Rhodes, Greece
- Venue: Rhodes Tennis Club

Champions

Singles
- (Israel) Dudi Sela

Doubles
- (Jamaica) Dustin Brown / (Germany) Simon Stadler
- Ixian Grand Aegean Tennis Cup

The 2010 Ixian Grand Aegean Tennis Cup was a professional tennis tournament played on outdoor hard courts. It was part of the Tretorn SERIE+ of the 2010 ATP Challenger Tour. It took place in Rhodes, Greece between April 26 and May 2, 2010.

== Champions ==
=== Singles ===
(Israel) Dudi Sela def. (Germany) Rainer Schüttler, 7–6(3), 6–3

=== Doubles ===
(Jamaica) Dustin Brown / (Germany) Simon Stadler def. (United Kingdom) Jonathan Marray / (United Kingdom) Jamie Murray, 7-6(4), 6-7(4), [10-7]

== ATP entrants ==
=== Seeds ===
Nationality	Player	Ranking*	Seeding
SUI	Marco Chiudinelli	56	1
ISR	Dudi Sela	70	2
GER	Rainer Schüttler	99	3
TPE	Lu Yen-hsun	102	4
JAM	Dustin Brown	105	5
ISR	Harel Levy	124	6
SUI	Stéphane Bohli	132	7
GER	Björn Phau	142	8

- Rankings are as of April 19, 2010.

=== Other entrants ===
The following players received entry from the qualifying draw:

- (Germany) Denis Gremelmayr
- (Russia) Mikhail Ledovskikh
- (Latvia) Andis Juška
- (Slovakia) Andrej Martin

=== Top Greek Players ===
Year	Rhodian Players	Rest of Greece
2010	(Greece) Nikos Kontakis	(Greece) Paris Gemouchidis (WC) (Greece) Alexandros Jakupovic (WC) (Greece) Theodoros Angelinos (WC) (Greece) Konstantinos Economidis (WC) (Greece) Charalampos Kapogiannis
