= 2017 Trofeo Città di Brescia =

- Date: 13–19 November
- Edition: 4th
- Surface: Carpet / Indoor
- Location: Brescia, Italy

Champions

Singles
- (Slovakia) Lukáš Lacko

Doubles
- (Netherlands) Sander Arends / (Belgium) Sander Gillé
← 2016 ·	Trofeo Città di Brescia	· 2018 →

The 2017 Trofeo Città di Brescia was a professional tennis tournament played on carpet courts. It was the fourth edition of the tournament which was part of the 2017 ATP Challenger Tour. It took place in Brescia, Italy between 13 and 19 November 2017.

== Singles main-draw entrants ==
=== Seeds ===
Country	Player	Rank^{1}	Seed
~~HUN~~	~~Márton Fucsovics~~	~~84~~	~~1~~
~~ROU~~	~~Marius Copil~~	~~91~~	~~2~~
ITA	Andreas Seppi	94	3
SVK	Lukáš Lacko	126	4
GER	Oscar Otte	134	5
ITA	Stefano Travaglia	137	6
LTU	Ričardas Berankis	141	7
BIH	Mirza Bašić	153	8

- ^{1} Rankings are as of 6 November 2017.

=== Other entrants ===
The following players received wildcards into the singles main draw:

- (Italy) Filippo Baldi
- (Italy) Liam Caruana
- (Spain) Alejandro Davidovich Fokina
- (Italy) Andrea Pellegrino

The following player received entry into the singles main draw using a protected ranking:

- (Uzbekistan) Farrukh Dustov

The following player received entry into the singles main draw as an alternate:

- (France) Constant Lestienne

The following players received entry from the qualifying draw:

- (Belarus) Aliaksandr Bury
- (Slovakia) Lukáš Klein
- (Russia) Denis Matsukevich
- (Ukraine) Volodymyr Uzhylovskyi

The following players received entry as lucky losers:

- (Italy) Giovanni Fonio
- (Switzerland) Luca Margaroli
- (Slovakia) Patrik Néma

== Champions ==
=== Singles ===
- (Slovakia) Lukáš Lacko def. (Lithuania) Laurynas Grigelis 6–1, 6–2.

=== Doubles ===
- (Netherlands) Sander Arends / (Belgium) Sander Gillé def. (Switzerland) Luca Margaroli / (Austria) Tristan-Samuel Weissborn 6–2, 6–3.
