= 2016 Trofeo Città di Brescia =

- Date: 14 November – 20 November
- Edition: 3rd
- Surface: Carpet / Indoor
- Location: Brescia, Italy

Champions

Singles
- (Italy) Luca Vanni

Doubles
- (Russia) Mikhail Elgin / (Russia) Alexander Kudryavtsev
← 2015 ·	Trofeo Città di Brescia	· 2017 →

The 2016 Trofeo Città di Brescia is a professional tennis tournament played on carpet courts. It is the third edition of the tournament which was part of the 2016 ATP Challenger Tour. It takes place in Brescia, Italy between November 14 and November 20, 2016.

== Singles main-draw entrants ==
=== Seeds ===
Country	Player	Rank^{1}	Seed
SVK	Lukáš Lacko	112	1
CZE	~~Lukáš Rosol~~	~~113~~	~~2~~
SUI	Marco Chiudinelli	116	3
RUS	Evgeny Donskoy	118	4
ARG	Leonardo Mayer	132	5
ESP	Enrique López Pérez	163	6
RUS	Alexander Kudryavtsev	173	7
SRB	Marko Tepavac	175	8

- ^{1} Rankings are as of November 7, 2016.

=== Other entrants ===
The following players received wildcards into the singles main draw:

- (Italy) Matteo Berrettini
- (Spain) Tommy Robredo
- (Italy) Stefano Travaglia
- (Italy) Andrea Vavassori

The following player received entry into the singles main draw with a protected ranking:

- (Slovenia) Blaž Kavčič

The following player received entry into the singles main draw as a special exempt:

- (Germany) Kevin Krawietz

The following players received entry from the qualifying draw:

- (Belarus) Egor Gerasimov
- (Czech Republic) Marek Jaloviec
- (Czech Republic) Petr Michnev
- (Germany) Lukas Rüpke

The following players received entry as lucky losers:

- (Lithuania) Laurynas Grigelis
- (Italy) Gianluca Mager

== Champions ==
=== Singles ===
- (Italy) Luca Vanni def. (Lithuania) Laurynas Grigelis, 6–7^{(5–7)}, 6–4, 7–6^{(10–8)}.

=== Doubles ===
- (Russia) Mikhail Elgin / (Russia) Alexander Kudryavtsev def. (Netherlands) Wesley Koolhof / (Netherlands) Matwé Middelkoop, 7–6^{(7–4)}, 6–3.
