= 2017 Trofeo Città di Brescia – Singles =

Singles
- 2017 Trofeo Città di Brescia

Final
- Champion: (Slovakia) Lukáš Lacko
- Runner-up: (Lithuania) Laurynas Grigelis
- Score: 6–1, 6–2

Events
Singles	Doubles
- Trofeo Città di Brescia

Luca Vanni was the defending champion but chose not to defend his title.

Lukáš Lacko won the title after defeating Laurynas Grigelis 6–1, 6–2 in the final.

== Seeds ==
1. (Hungary) Márton Fucsovics (withdrew)
2. (Romania) Marius Copil (withdrew)
3. (Italy) Andreas Seppi (quarterfinals)
4. (Slovakia) Lukáš Lacko (champion)
5. (Germany) Oscar Otte (first round)
6. (Italy) Stefano Travaglia (quarterfinals)
7. (Lithuania) Ričardas Berankis (second round)
8. (Bosnia and Herzegovina) Mirza Bašić (semifinals)

== Draw ==
Key

- Q = Qualifier
- WC = Wild card
- LL = Lucky loser
- Alt = Alternate
- ITF = ITF entry
- PR = Protected ranking
- SR = Special ranking
- SE = Special exempt
- JE = Junior exempt
- JR = Junior Accelerator Programme entrant
- CO = College Accelerator Programme entrant
- NG = Next Gen Accelerator Program entrant
- w/o = Walkover
- r = Retired
- d = Defaulted

=== Finals ===
Semifinals
(Croatia) Viktor Galović	6^{4}	1
(Lithuania) Laurynas Grigelis	7^{7}	6
4	(Slovakia) Lukáš Lacko	6^{3}	6	7^{7}
8	(Bosnia and Herzegovina) Mirza Bašić	7^{7}	4	6^{1}

Final
(Lithuania) Laurynas Grigelis	1	2
4	(Slovakia) Lukáš Lacko	6	6

=== Top half ===
First round
LL	(Switzerland) L Margaroli	1	7	7
Alt	(France) C Lestienne	6	5	5
(Belarus) U Ignatik	6	6
(Italy) A Bega	3	4
(Croatia) V Galović	6	6^{7}	6
(Italy) Lorenzo Frigerio	3	7^{9}	2
(Italy) A Arnaboldi	6	2	2
7	(Lithuania) R Berankis	3	6	6
3	(Italy) A Seppi	7	6
Q	(Ukraine) V Uzhylovskyi	5	4
PR	(Uzbekistan) F Dustov	3	4
WC	(Spain) A Davidovich Fokina	6	6
Q	(Russia) D Matsukevich	2	2
(France) Y Jankovits	6	6
(Lithuania) L Grigelis	6	7^{8}
5	(Germany) O Otte	4	6^{6}

Second round
LL	(Switzerland) L Margaroli	6^{5}	6	3
(Belarus) U Ignatik	7^{7}	3	6
(Croatia) V Galović	7^{7}	6
7	(Lithuania) R Berankis	6^{3}	4
3	(Italy) A Seppi	6	6
WC	(Spain) A Davidovich Fokina	1	4
(France) Y Jankovits	4	2
(Lithuania) L Grigelis	6	6

Quarterfinals
(Belarus) U Ignatik	1	4
(Croatia) V Galović	6	6
3	(Italy) A Seppi	6	3	4
(Lithuania) L Grigelis	3	6	6

Semifinals
(Croatia) V Galović	6^{4}	1
(Lithuania) L Grigelis	7^{7}	6

=== Bottom half ===
First round
6	(Italy) S Travaglia	3	6	6
(Italy) M Donati	6	3	4
WC	(Italy) F Baldi	6	3	7^{7}
WC	(Italy) L Caruana	4	6	6^{3}
LL	(Italy) G Fonio	7^{11}	2	6
(Italy) L Sonego	6^{9}	6	3
Q	(Slovakia) L Klein	3	6^{2}
4	(Slovakia) L Lacko	6	7^{7}
8	(Bosnia and Herzegovina) M Bašić	7^{7}	6
(Italy) A Basso	6^{1}	4
(Estonia) J Zopp	7^{7}	6
WC	(Italy) A Pellegrino	6^{4}	2
(Spain) B Zapata Miralles	6^{2}	3
(Australia) A De Minaur	7^{7}	6
Q	(Belarus) A Bury	6^{8}	6^{7}
LL	(Slovakia) Patrik Néma	7^{10}	7^{9}

Second round
6	(Italy) S Travaglia	7^{8}	6
WC	(Italy) F Baldi	6^{6}	3
LL	(Italy) G Fonio	4	3
4	(Slovakia) L Lacko	6	6
8	(Bosnia and Herzegovina) M Bašić	3	6	6
(Estonia) J Zopp	6	3	4
(Australia) A De Minaur	6^{4}	6	6
LL	(Slovakia) P Néma	7^{7}	3	2

Quarterfinals
6	(Italy) S Travaglia	1	4
4	(Slovakia) L Lacko	6	6
8	(Bosnia and Herzegovina) M Bašić	7^{7}	7^{8}
(Australia) A De Minaur	6^{5}	6^{6}

Semifinals
4	(Slovakia) L Lacko	6^{3}	6	7^{7}
8	(Bosnia and Herzegovina) M Bašić	7^{7}	4	6^{1}
