= 2014 Trofeo Città di Brescia =

- Date: 10 November – 16 November
- Edition: 1st
- Surface: Carpet / Indoor
- Location: Brescia, Italy

Champions

Singles
- (Ukraine) Illya Marchenko

Doubles
- (Ukraine) Illya Marchenko / (Ukraine) Denys Molchanov
Trofeo Città di Brescia	· 2015 →

The 2014 Trofeo Città di Brescia was a professional tennis tournament played on carpet courts. It was the first edition of the tournament which is part of the 2014 ATP Challenger Tour. It took place in Brescia, Italy between November 10 and November 16, 2014.

== Singles main-draw entrants ==
=== Seeds ===
Country	Player	Rank^{1}	Seed
NED	Igor Sijsling	86	1
GER	Dustin Brown	88	2
SLO	Blaž Kavčič	95	3
SRB	Filip Krajinović	97	4
SRB	Viktor Troicki	106	5
ESP	Daniel Gimeno Traver	110	6
GER	Andreas Beck	116	7
TPE	Jimmy Wang	123	8

- ^{1} Rankings are as of November 3, 2014.

=== Other entrants ===
The following players received wildcards into the singles main draw:

- (Italy) Filippo Baldi
- (Italy) Salvatore Caruso
- (Italy) Pietro Licciardi
- (Italy) Gianluca Mager

The following players received entry from the qualifying draw:

- (Spain) Andrés Artuñedo
- (Bosnia and Herzegovina) Mirza Bašić
- (Russia) Konstantin Kravchuk
- (Russia) Denis Matsukevich

The following player received entry by an alternate spot:

- (Spain) Daniel Gimeno Traver

The following player received entry by a protected ranking:

- (Ukraine) Sergei Bubka

== Champions ==
=== Singles ===
- (Ukraine) Illya Marchenko def. (Uzbekistan) Farrukh Dustov, 6–4, 5–7, 6–2

=== Doubles ===
- (Ukraine) Illya Marchenko / (Ukraine) Denys Molchanov def. (Czech Republic) Roman Jebavý / (Poland) Błażej Koniusz, 7–6^{(7–4)}, 6–3
