= 2015 Trofeo Città di Brescia =

- Date: 15 November – 21 November
- Edition: 2nd
- Surface: Carpet / Indoor
- Location: Brescia, Italy

Champions

Singles
- (Netherlands) Igor Sijsling

Doubles
- (Serbia) Ilija Bozoljac / (Slovakia) Igor Zelenay
← 2014 ·	Trofeo Città di Brescia	· 2016 →

The 2015 Trofeo Città di Brescia was a professional tennis tournament played on carpet courts. It was the second edition of the tournament which was part of the 2015 ATP Challenger Tour. It took place in Brescia, Italy between November 16 and November 21, 2015.

== Singles main-draw entrants ==
=== Seeds ===
Country	Player	Rank^{1}	Seed
UKR	Sergiy Stakhovsky	62	1
~~LTU~~	~~Ričardas Berankis~~	~~82~~	~~2~~
UKR	Illya Marchenko	86	3
ISR	Dudi Sela	92	4
GER	Benjamin Becker	96	5
TUR	Marsel İlhan	109	6
GER	Michael Berrer	111	7
GER	Dustin Brown	114	8

- ^{1} Rankings are as of November 9, 2015.

=== Other entrants ===
The following players received wildcards into the singles main draw:

- (France) Grégoire Barrère
- (Italy) Gianluca Mager
- (Italy) Lorenzo Sonego

The following players received into the singles main draw entry as special exempts:

- (Serbia) Laslo Đere
- (Belarus) Egor Gerasimov

The following players received entry from the qualifying draw:

- (Switzerland) Marco Chiudinelli
- (Germany) Kevin Krawietz
- (Italy) Roberto Marcora
- (Italy) Matteo Viola

The following players received entry as a lucky losers:

- (Sweden) Elias Ymer
- (Italy) Francesco Borgo
- (Bulgaria) Dimitar Kuzmanov
- (Italy) Andrea Pellegrino

== Champions ==
=== Singles ===
- (Netherlands) Igor Sijsling def. (Bosnia and Herzegovina) Mirza Bašić 6–4, 6–4

=== Doubles ===
- (Serbia) Ilija Bozoljac / (Slovakia) Igor Zelenay def. (Bosnia and Herzegovina) Mirza Bašić / (Croatia) Nikola Mektić 6–0, 6–3
