= 2015 Trofeo Città di Brescia – Singles =

Singles
- 2015 Trofeo Città di Brescia

Final
- Champion: (Netherlands) Igor Sijsling
- Runner-up: (Bosnia and Herzegovina) Mirza Bašić
- Score: 6–4, 6–4

Events
Singles	Doubles
- Trofeo Città di Brescia

Igor Sijsling won the title, defeating Mirza Bašić in the final 6–4, 6–4 .

== Seeds ==
1. (Ukraine) Sergiy Stakhovsky (second round)
2. (Lithuania) Ričardas Berankis (withdrew)
3. (Ukraine) Illya Marchenko (quarterfinals)
4. (Israel) Dudi Sela (first round)
5. (Germany) Benjamin Becker (second round)
6. (Turkey) Marsel İlhan (first round)
7. (Germany) Michael Berrer (second round)
8. (Germany) Dustin Brown (semifinals)

== Draw ==
Key

- Q = Qualifier
- WC = Wild card
- LL = Lucky loser
- Alt = Alternate
- ITF = ITF entry
- PR = Protected ranking
- SR = Special ranking
- SE = Special exempt
- JE = Junior exempt
- JR = Junior Accelerator Programme entrant
- CO = College Accelerator Programme entrant
- NG = Next Gen Accelerator Program entrant
- w/o = Walkover
- r = Retired
- d = Defaulted

=== Finals ===
Semifinals
(Netherlands) Igor Sijsling	7^{8}	7^{8}
(Italy) Luca Vanni	6^{6}	6^{6}
8	(Germany) Dustin Brown	4	6^{6}
(Bosnia and Herzegovina) Mirza Bašić	6	7^{8}

Final
(Netherlands) Igor Sijsling	6	6
(Bosnia and Herzegovina) Mirza Bašić	4	4

=== Top half ===
First round
1	(Ukraine) S Stakhovsky	6	7
LL	(Italy) Francesco Borgo	4	5
(Netherlands) I Sijsling	6	7
Q	(Germany) K Krawietz	2	5
Q	(Italy) M Viola	4	6	4
(Uzbekistan) F Dustov	6	4	6
(Slovakia) L Lacko	6	6
6	(Turkey) M İlhan	1	4
4	(Israel) D Sela	3	6	3
Q	(Italy) R Marcora	6	3	6
WC	(Italy) L Sonego	2	2
(Slovakia) N Gombos	6	6
(Slovakia) J Kovalík	4	2
(Italy) L Vanni	6	6
(Germany) D Brands	7^{7}	4	4
5	(Germany) B Becker	6^{0}	6	6

Second round
1	(Ukraine) S Stakhovsky	6^{5}	2
(Netherlands) I Sijsling	7^{7}	6
(Uzbekistan) F Dustov	6	6^{2}	7^{7}
(Slovakia) L Lacko	4	7^{7}	6^{4}
Q	(Italy) R Marcora	6	4	2
(Slovakia) N Gombos	4	6	6
(Italy) L Vanni	6	6^{6}	6
5	(Germany) B Becker	4	7^{8}	4

Quarterfinals
(Netherlands) I Sijsling	6	6
(Uzbekistan) F Dustov	3	4
(Slovakia) N Gombos	4	4
(Italy) L Vanni	6	6

Semifinals
(Netherlands) I Sijsling	7^{8}	7^{8}
(Italy) L Vanni	6^{6}	6^{6}

=== Bottom half ===
First round
8	(Germany) D Brown	6	6^{3}	6
WC	(Italy) G Mager	4	7^{7}	3
(Italy) S Caruso	2	7^{7}	6
LL	(Sweden) E Ymer	6	6^{5}	3
(Russia) M Youzhny	2^{r}
(Italy) A Arnaboldi	4
SE	(Serbia) L Đere	4	7^{7}	1
3	(Ukraine) I Marchenko	6	6^{5}	6
7	(Germany) M Berrer	7^{7}	4	7^{7}
(Kazakhstan) A Nedovyesov	6^{1}	6	6^{2}
SE	(Belarus) E Gerasimov	6^{5}	6^{3}
Q	(Switzerland) M Chiudinelli	7^{7}	7^{7}
WC	(France) G Barrère	5	4
(Bosnia and Herzegovina) M Bašić	7	6
LL	(Italy) A Pellegrino	5	3
LL	(Bulgaria) D Kuzmanov	7	6

Second round
8	(Germany) D Brown	6	7^{7}
(Italy) S Caruso	4	6^{4}
(Italy) A Arnaboldi	6^{5}	3
3	(Ukraine) I Marchenko	7^{7}	6
7	(Germany) M Berrer	6	4	2
Q	(Switzerland) M Chiudinelli	3	6	6
(Bosnia and Herzegovina) M Bašić	6	6
LL	(Bulgaria) D Kuzmanov	3	4

Quarterfinals
8	(Germany) D Brown	6	6
3	(Ukraine) I Marchenko	3	2
Q	(Switzerland) M Chiudinelli	6	6^{3}	4
(Bosnia and Herzegovina) M Bašić	3	7^{7}	6

Semifinals
8	(Germany) D Brown	4	6^{6}
(Bosnia and Herzegovina) M Bašić	6	7^{8}
