= 2015 Trofeo Città di Brescia – Doubles =

Italian international tennis tournament

Doubles
- 2015 Trofeo Città di Brescia

Final
- Champion: (Serbia) Ilija Bozoljac (Slovakia) Igor Zelenay
- Runner-up: (Bosnia and Herzegovina) Mirza Bašić (Croatia) Nikola Mektić
- Score: 6–0, 6–3

Events
Singles	Doubles
- Trofeo Città di Brescia

Ilija Bozoljac and Igor Zelenay won the title, defeating Mirza Bašić and Nikola Mektić in the final 6–0, 6–3 .

== Seeds ==
1. (Netherlands) Wesley Koolhof / (Netherlands) Matwé Middelkoop (semifinals)
2. (Belarus) Aliaksandr Bury / (Sweden) Andreas Siljeström (quarterfinals)
3. (Poland) Mariusz Fyrstenberg / (Poland) Mateusz Kowalczyk (quarterfinals)
4. (Australia) Carsten Ball / (Germany) Dustin Brown (first round)

== Draw ==
Key

- Q = Qualifier
- WC = Wild card
- LL = Lucky loser
- Alt = Alternate
- ITF = ITF entry
- PR = Protected ranking
- SR = Special ranking
- SE = Special exempt
- JE = Junior exempt
- JR = Junior Accelerator Programme entrant
- CO = College Accelerator Programme entrant
- NG = Next Gen Accelerator Program entrant
- w/o = Walkover
- r = Retired
- d = Defaulted

=== Draw ===
First round
1	(Netherlands) W Koolhof (Netherlands) M Middelkoop	6	6^{7}	[10]
(Italy) A Arnaboldi (Italy) Francesco Borgo	1	7^{9}	[5]
(Israel) D Sela (Netherlands) I Sijsling	6	3	[4]
WC	(Czech Republic) L Dlouhý (Ukraine) S Stakhovsky	2	6	[10]
4	(Australia) C Ball (Germany) D Brown	6^{8}	6^{5}
(Serbia) I Bozoljac (Slovakia) I Zelenay	7^{10}	7^{7}
(Uzbekistan) F Dustov (Italy) A Motti	0	7	[10]
PR	(Switzerland) M Chiudinelli (Germany) K Krawietz	6	5	[8]
(Germany) F Moser (Croatia) A Šančić	7^{10}	6
WC	(Italy) E Dalla Valle (Italy) A Pellegrino	6^{8}	4
(Austria) M Neuchrist (Austria) T-S Weissborn	6^{7}	7^{8}	[4]
3	(Poland) M Fyrstenberg (Poland) M Kowalczyk	7^{9}	6^{6}	'[10]
Alt	(Italy) A Virgili (Italy) Matteo Volante	6	0	[6]
(Bosnia and Herzegovina) M Bašić (Croatia) N Mektić	1	6	[10]
(Romania) P Grigoriu (Romania) C Pavăl	7^{7}	3	[7]
2	(Belarus) A Bury (Sweden) A Siljeström	6^{4}	6	[10]

Quarterfinals
1	(Netherlands) W Koolhof (Netherlands) M Middelkoop	4	6	[10]
WC	(Czech Republic) L Dlouhý (Ukraine) S Stakhovsky	6	3	[9]
(Serbia) I Bozoljac (Slovakia) I Zelenay	6	6
(Uzbekistan) F Dustov (Italy) A Motti	3	3
(Germany) F Moser (Croatia) A Šančić	7^{7}	6
3	(Poland) M Fyrstenberg (Poland) M Kowalczyk	6^{5}	3
(Bosnia and Herzegovina) M Bašić (Croatia) N Mektić	6	7
2	(Belarus) A Bury (Sweden) A Siljeström	4	5

Semifinals
1	(Netherlands) W Koolhof (Netherlands) M Middelkoop	7^{11}	3	[9]
(Serbia) I Bozoljac (Slovakia) I Zelenay	6^{9}	6	[11]
(Germany) F Moser (Croatia) A Šančić	3	6^{6}
(Bosnia and Herzegovina) M Bašić (Croatia) N Mektić	6	7^{8}

Final
(Serbia) I Bozoljac (Slovakia) I Zelenay	6	6
(Bosnia and Herzegovina) M Bašić (Croatia) N Mektić	0	3
