= Laurynas Grigelis =

Lithuanian tennis player

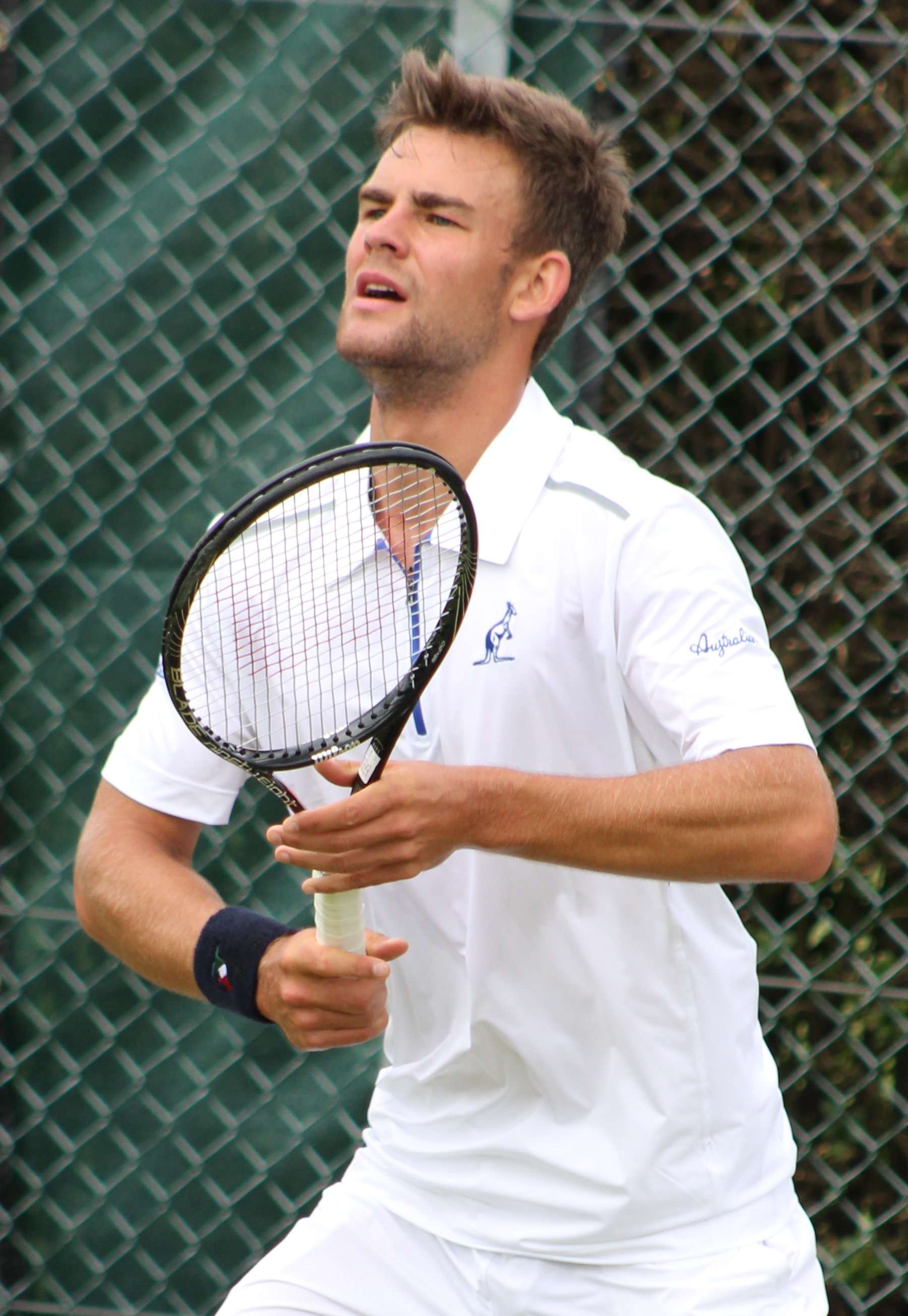
- Country (sports): Lithuania
- Residence: Costa di Mezzate, Italy
- Born: August 14, 1991 (age 34) Klaipėda, Lithuania
- Height: 1.83 m (6 ft 0 in)
- Turned pro: 2008
- Retired: 2021
- Plays: Right-handed (two-handed backhand)
- Coach: Fabio Gorietti; Federico Torresi
- Prize money: $350,010

Singles
- Career record: 13-20
- Career titles: 0
- Highest ranking: No. 183 (9 July 2012)

Grand Slam singles results
- Australian Open: Q1 (2012)
- French Open: Q3 (2012)
- Wimbledon: Q2 (2012, 2014)
- US Open: Q3 (2011)

Doubles
- Career record: 8-11
- Career titles: 0
- Highest ranking: No. 132 (12 November 2012)

Team competitions
- Davis Cup: 23–30

Laurynas Grigelis (born August 14, 1991) is a Lithuanian former professional tennis player and a prominent member of the Lithuania Davis Cup team. Grigelis holds the best ATP doubles ranking of world No. 132 for a Lithuanian player of all time achieved on 12 November 2012 and a singles ranking of No. 182 achieved on 9 July 2012.

Grigelis won his first title when he was 18 at a Futures tournament in Wrexham, United Kingdom. On ATP Challenger Tour Grigelis has won 13 titles, one singles and twelve doubles. He won his only singles title in summer 2011 in Aptos, United States. In 2012, Grigelis won five doubles titles. He captured three titles with Uladzimir Ignatik in Wofsburg, Germany, Cherbourg, and Saint Rémy, France, he achieved one title with Rameez Junaid in Saint–Brieuc, France, and one title with Alessandro Motti in Naples, Italy.

Since the end of 2010 Grigelis was coached by Giuseppe Menga.

Grigelis announced his retirement from professional tennis on 19 September 2021.

In 2025, Laurynas Grigelis made his debut as the head coach of Lithuania's Billie Jean King Cup team.

== Challenger and Futures finals ==
=== Singles: 32 (23–9) ===
Legend (singles) ATP Challenger Tour (1–2) ITF Futures Tour (22–7)	Titles by surface Hard (8–4) Clay (13–4) Grass (0–0) Carpet (2–1)

Result	W–L	Date	Tournament	Tier	Surface	Opponent	Score
Win	1–0	Sep 2009	Great Britain F13, Wrexham	Futures	Hard	(United Kingdom) David Rice	6–2, 6–3
Loss	1–1	Sep 2010	Italy F27, Brusaporto	Futures	Hard (i)	(Sweden) Filip Prpic	3–6, 4–6
Win	2–1	May 2011	Morocco F3, Agadir	Futures	Clay	(Lebanon) Bassam Beidas	6–0, 6–0
Win	3–1	Jul 2011	Aptos, USA	Challenger	Hard	(Serbia) Ilija Bozoljac	6–2, 7–6^{(7–4)}
Loss	3–2	Mar 2013	Switzerland F3, Taverne	Futures	Carpet (i)	(Austria) Martin Fischer	6–7^{(4–7)}, 1–6
Win	4–2	Aug 2013	Lithuania F1, Vilnius	Futures	Clay	(Italy) Giammarco Micolani	6–1, 6–3
Win	5–2	Sep 2013	Turkey F37, Antalya	Futures	Hard	(Italy) Claudio Fortuna	6–2, 6–3
Win	6–2	Oct 2013	Great Britain F21, Loughborough	Futures	Hard (i)	(United Kingdom) David Rice	6–4, 3–6, 6–3
Win	7–2	Oct 2013	Great Britain F22, Tipton	Futures	Hard (i)	(Belgium) Joris De Loore	6–3, 6–3
Win	8–2	Nov 2013	Great Britain F23, Edgbaston	Futures	Hard (i)	(Belgium) Joris De Loore	6–3, 1–6, 6–0
Win	9–2	Dec 2013	Czech Republic F7, Opava	Futures	Carpet (i)	(Belarus) Uladzimir Ignatik	4–6, 6–3, 7–6^{(7–2)}
Win	10–2	Jan 2014	Great Britain F1, Glasgow	Futures	Hard (i)	(United Kingdom) Daniel Smethurst	7–5, 6–7^{(4–7)}, 7–5
Loss	10–3	Nov 2014	Great Britain F18, Loughborough	Futures	Hard (i)	(Belgium) Maxime Authom	2–6, 1–6
Win	11–3	Feb 2015	Italy F1, Sondrio	Futures	Hard (i)	(France) Quentin Halys	6–7^{(7–9)}, 6–3, 7–5
Win	12–3	Jul 2015	Romania F7, Focșani	Futures	Clay	(Argentina) Mariano Kestelboim	6–4, 6–3
Win	13–3	Jul 2015	Lithuania F1, Vilnius	Futures	Clay	(Russia) Ronald Slobodchikov	6–3, 6–2
Loss	13–4	Aug 2015	Romania F12, Iași	Futures	Clay	(Spain) Gerard Granollers Pujol	3–6, 6–3, 6–7^{(0–7)}
Win	14–4	Aug 2015	Romania F13, Mediaș	Futures	Clay	(Romania) Dragoș Dima	6–2, 6–3
Loss	14–5	May 2016	Romania F2, Galați	Futures	Clay	(Argentina) Juan Pablo Paz	4–6, 1–6
Win	15–5	Aug 2016	Latvia F1, Jūrmala	Futures	Clay	(Latvia) Miķelis Lībietis	6–4, 7–5
Win	16–5	Sep 2016	Romania F15, Brașov	Futures	Clay	(Argentina) Gabriel Alejandro Hidalgo	7–6^{(7–1)}, 6–2
Win	17–5	Sep 2016	Romania F16, Bucharest	Futures	Clay	(Italy) Claudio Fortuna	6–4, 4–6, 6–1
Win	18–5	Oct 2016	Tunisia F26, Hammamet	Futures	Clay	(France) Benjamin Bonzi	6–4, 6–4
Win	19–5	Oct 2016	Tunisia F28, Hammamet	Futures	Clay	(Portugal) Fred Gil	6–0, 6–1
Loss	19–6	Nov 2016	Brescia, Italy	Challenger	Hard (i)	(Italy) Luca Vanni	7–6^{(7–5)}, 4–6, 6–7^{(8–10)}
Loss	19–7	Jul 2017	Poland F4, Mrągowo	Futures	Clay	(Australia) Alexei Popyrin	3–6, 6–3, 3–6
Loss	19–8	Jul 2017	Poland F5, Mrągowo	Futures	Clay	(Czech Republic) Zdeněk Kolář	5–7, 0–1 ret.
Win	20–8	Sep 2017	Romania F12, Brașov	Futures	Clay	(Argentina) Franco Agamenone	6–2, 6–2
Win	21–8	Nov 2017	Morocco F4, Casablanca	Futures	Clay	(Morocco) Lamine Ouahab	4–6, 6–2, 7–5
Win	22–8	Nov 2017	Morocco F5, Beni Mellal	Futures	Clay	(Spain) Bernabé Zapata Miralles	6–1, 6–2
Loss	22–9	Nov 2017	Brescia, Italy	Challenger	Hard (i)	(Slovakia) Lukáš Lacko	1–6, 2–6
Win	23–9	Mar 2018	Italy F1, Trento	Futures	Carpet (i)	(Austria) Maximilian Neuchrist	6–4, 6–4

=== Doubles: 43 (29–14) ===
Legend (doubles) ATP Challenger Tour (12–4) ITF Futures Tour (17–10)	Titles by surface Hard (12–5) Clay (16–8) Grass (0–0) Carpet (1–1)

Result	W–L	Date	Tournament	Tier	Surface	Partner	Opponents	Score
Loss	0–1	Sep 2009	Italy F26, Trieste	Futures	Clay	(Italy) Giuseppe Menga	(Italy) Filippo Leonardi (Italy) Jacopo Marchegiani	6–2, 4–6, [7–10]
Loss	0–2	May 2010	Italy F8, Pozzuoli	Futures	Clay	(United Kingdom) Daniel Evans	(Argentina) Juan-Martín Aranguren (Argentina) Alejandro Fabbri	4–6, 6–7^{(4–7)}
Loss	0–3	Jun 2011	Italy F12, Bergamo	Futures	Clay	(Italy) Riccardo Sinicropi	(Italy) Giorgio Portaluri (Argentina) Juan-Pablo Villar	7–5, 3–6, [8–10]
Win	1–3	Feb 2012	Wolfsburg, Germany	Challenger	Carpet (i)	(Belarus) Uladzimir Ignatik	(Poland) Tomasz Bednarek (France) Olivier Charroin	7–5, 4–6, [10–5]
Win	2–3	Mar 2012	Cherbourg, France	Challenger	Hard (i)	(Belarus) Uladzimir Ignatik	(Germany) Dustin Brown (United Kingdom) Jonathan Marray	4–6, 7–6^{(11–9)}, [10–0]
Win	3–3	Apr 2012	Saint Brieuc, France	Challenger	Clay (i)	(Australia) Rameez Junaid	(France) Stéphane Robert (France) Laurent Rochette	1–6, 6–2, [10–6]
Win	4–3	Apr 2012	Napoli, Italy	Challenger	Clay	(Italy) Alessandro Motti	(Australia) Rameez Junaid (Slovakia) Igor Zelenay	6–4, 6–4
Win	5–3	Sep 2012	St Rémy, France	Challenger	Hard	(Belarus) Uladzimir Ignatik	(Spain) Jordi Marsé-Vidri (Spain) Carlos Poch Gradin	6–7^{(4–7)}, 6–3, [10–6]
Loss	5–4	Oct 2012	Great Britain F17, Glasgow	Futures	Hard (i)	(Germany) Bastian Knittel	(United Kingdom) David Rice (United Kingdom) Sean Thornley	3–6, 2–6
Loss	5–5	Oct 2012	Great Britain F18, Cardiff	Futures	Hard (i)	(Italy) Giuseppe Menga	(Germany) Bastian Knittel (Germany) Kevin Krawietz	6–3, 4–6, [7–10]
Loss	5–6	Jun 2013	Korea F4, Changwon	Futures	Hard	(Spain) Enrique López Pérez	(South Korea) Lim Yong-kyu (South Korea) Nam Ji-sung	7–5, 4–6, [9–11]
Win	6–6	Aug 2013	Lithuania F1, Vilnius	Futures	Clay	(Italy) Giuseppe Menga	(Ukraine) Ivan Anikanov (Belarus) Yaraslav Shyla	7–5, 6–3
Win	7–6	Sep 2013	Turkey F36, Antalya	Futures	Hard	(Italy) Federico Gaio	(Israel) Dekel Bar (United Kingdom) Richard Gabb	1–6, 6–3, [10–8]
Win	8–6	Sep 2013	Turkey F37, Antalya	Futures	Hard	(Italy) Federico Gaio	(Russia) Alexander Krasnorutskiy (Russia) Anton Manegin	6–3, 7–6^{(7–5)}
Loss	8–7	Mar 2014	Switzerland F1, Taverne	Futures	Carpet (i)	(Switzerland) Henri Laaksonen	(Sweden) Jesper Brunström (Denmark) Frederik Nielsen	4–6, 6–7^{(4–7)}
Loss	8–8	Jul 2014	Recanati, Italy	Challenger	Hard	(Republic of Ireland) James Cluskey	(Serbia) Ilija Bozoljac (Serbia) Goran Tošić	7–5, 4–6, [5–10]
Win	9–8	Aug 2014	Aptos, USA	Challenger	Hard	(Belgium) Ruben Bemelmans	(India) Purav Raja (India) Sanam Singh	6–3, 4–6, [11–9]
Win	10–8	Oct 2014	Belarus F3, Minsk	Futures	Hard (i)	(Lithuania) Lukas Mugevičius	(Uzbekistan) Shonigmatjon Shofayziyev (Belarus) Andrei Vasilevski	6–4, 4–6, [10–6]
Win	11–8	Oct 2014	Great Britain F17, Manchester	Futures	Hard (i)	(United Kingdom) David Rice	(United Kingdom) Sean Thornley (United Kingdom) Datten Walsh	6–4, 6–4
Win	12–8	Jan 2015	Casablanca, Morocco	Challenger	Clay	(Romania) Adrian Ungur	(Italy) Flavio Cipolla (Italy) Alessandro Motti	3–6, 6–2, [10–5]
Win	13–8	Feb 2015	Italy F1, Sondrio	Futures	Hard (i)	(Italy) Francesco Borgo	(Netherlands) Sander Arends (Netherlands) Niels Lootsma	6–2, 3–6, [10–7]
Win	14–8	Jul 2015	Romania F7, Focșani	Futures	Clay	(Italy) Claudio Fortuna	(Belarus) Maxim Dubarenco (Ukraine) Vladyslav Manafov	6–2, 6–1
Win	15–8	Jul 2015	Romania F8, Pitești	Futures	Clay	(Italy) Claudio Fortuna	(Romania) Petru-Alexandru Luncanu (Lithuania) Lukas Mugevičius	6–3, 6–1
Win	16–8	Jul 2015	Lithuania F1, Vilnius	Futures	Clay	(Lithuania) Lukas Mugevičius	(Latvia) Miķelis Lībietis (United States) Hunter Reese	7–5, 3–6, [13–11]
Win	17–8	Aug 2015	Romania F13, Mediaș	Futures	Clay	(Italy) Claudio Fortuna	(Spain) Carlos Boluda-Purkiss (Italy) Alessandro Colella	6–3, 6–1
Win	18–8	Oct 2015	Casablanca, Morocco	Challenger	Clay	(Egypt) Mohamed Safwat	(Netherlands) Thiemo de Bakker (Netherlands) Stephan Fransen	6–4, 6–3
Win	19–8	Feb 2016	Egypt F3, Sharm El Sheikh	Futures	Hard	(Italy) Claudio Fortuna	(France) Laurent Rochette (France) Thibault Venturino	6–3, 3–6, [10–6]
Win	20–8	Feb 2016	Egypt F4, Sharm El Sheikh	Futures	Hard	(Italy) Claudio Fortuna	(Czech Republic) Tomáš Papík (Czech Republic) Pavel Staubert	6–3, 7–6^{(7–5)}
Win	21–8	Apr 2016	Italy F6, Santa Margherita di Pula	Futures	Clay	(Italy) Francesco Moncagatto	(France) Jérôme Inzerillo (France) Yannick Jankovits	6–3, 6–0
Loss	21–9	May 2016	Romania F2, Galați	Futures	Clay	(Lithuania) Lukas Mugevičius	(Mexico) Lucas Gómez (Argentina) Juan Pablo Paz	4–6, 6–4, [9–11]
Win	22–9	Jul 2016	Lithuania F1, Vilnius	Futures	Clay	(Lithuania) Lukas Mugevičius	(Poland) Michał Dembek (Poland) Jan Zieliński	7–5, 6–4
Loss	22–10	Aug 2016	Latvia F1, Jūrmala	Futures	Clay	(Italy) Claudio Fortuna	(United Kingdom) Jonathan Gray (United Kingdom) Ewan Moore	6–2, 4–6, [8–10]
Win	23–10	Oct 2016	Tunisia F26, Hammamet	Futures	Clay	(Spain) David Pérez Sanz	(France) Benjamin Bonzi (France) Mathias Bourgue	w/o
Win	24–10	Oct 2016	Tunisia F27, Hammamet	Futures	Clay	(Spain) Oriol Roca Batalla	(Italy) Tommaso Gabrieli (Italy) Luca Tomasetto	6–1, 6–1
Win	25–10	Mar 2017	Israel F1, Ramat HaSharon	Futures	Hard	(Hungary) Gábor Borsos	(Israel) Dekel Bar (Israel) Yshai Oliel	6–3, 6–4
Win	26–10	May 2017	Samarkand, Uzbekistan	Challenger	Clay	(Czech Republic) Zdeněk Kolář	(India) Prajnesh Gunneswaran (India) Vishnu Vardhan	7–6^{(7–2)}, 6–3
Win	27–10	Aug 2017	Liberec, Czech Republic	Challenger	Clay	(Czech Republic) Zdeněk Kolář	(Poland) Tomasz Bednarek (Netherlands) David Pel	6–3, 6–4
Loss	27–11	Nov 2017	Morocco F4, Casablanca	Futures	Clay	(France) Laurent Rochette	(Morocco) Amine Ahouda (Morocco) Lamine Ouahab	2–6, 6–3, [6–10]
Loss	27–12	Feb 2018	Bergamo, Italy	Challenger	Hard (i)	(Italy) Alessandro Motti	(United Kingdom) Scott Clayton (United Kingdom) Jonny O'Mara	7–5, 3–6, [13–15]
Loss	27–13	Jun 2018	Almaty, Kazakhstan	Challenger	Clay	(Ukraine) Vladyslav Manafov	(Germany) Kevin Krawietz (Germany) Andreas Mies	2–6, 6–7^{(2–7)}
Loss	27–14	Sep 2018	Banja Luka, Bosnia and Herzegovina	Challenger	Clay	(Italy) Alessandro Motti	(Slovakia) Andrej Martin (Chile) Hans Podlipnik Castillo	5–7, 6–4, [7–10]
Win	28–14	Feb 2019	Bergamo, Italy	Challenger	Hard (i)	(Czech Republic) Zdeněk Kolář	(Bosnia and Herzegovina) Tomislav Brkić (Germany) Dustin Brown	7–5, 7–6^{(9–7)}
Win	29–14	Jun 2019	Parma, Italy	Challenger	Clay	(Italy) Andrea Pellegrino	(Uruguay) Ariel Behar (Ecuador) Gonzalo Escobar	1–6, 6–3, [10–7]

== Singles performance timeline ==
Key
W	F	SF	QF	#R	RR	Q#	P#	DNQ	A	Z#	PO	G	S	B	NMS	NTI	P	NH

(W) winner; (F) finalist; (SF) semifinalist; (QF) quarterfinalist; (#R) rounds 4, 3, 2, 1; (RR) round-robin stage; (Q#) qualification round; (P#) preliminary round; (DNQ) did not qualify; (A) absent; (Z#) Davis/Fed Cup Zonal Group (with number indication) or (PO) play-off; (G) gold, (S) silver or (B) bronze Olympic/Paralympic medal; (NMS) not a Masters tournament; (NTI) not a Tier I tournament; (P) postponed; (NH) not held; (SR) strike rate (events won / competed); (W–L) win–loss record.
To avoid confusion and double counting, these charts are updated at the conclusion of a tournament or when the player's participation has ended.

The table is current through season 2017.

Tournament	2010	2011	2012	2013	2014	2015	2016	2017	SR	W–L
Grand Slam tournaments
Australian Open	A	A	Q1	A	A	A	A	A	0 / 0	0–0
French Open	A	A	Q3	A	Q1	A	A	A	0 / 0	0–0
Wimbledon	A	A	Q2	A	Q2	A	A	A	0 / 0	0–0
US Open	A	Q3	A	A	Q1	A	A	Q1	0 / 0	0–0
Win–loss	0–0	0–0	0–0	0–0	0–0	0–0	0–0	0–0	0 / 0	0–0

== Davis Cup ==
Grigelis is a member of the Lithuania Davis Cup team, having posted a 6–9 record in singles and a 5–3 record in doubles in twelve ties played.

All Davis Cup Matches
2008 Davis Cup Europe/Africa Zone Group III
Round	Date	Opponents	Tie score	Venue	Surface	Match	Opponent	Rubber score
RR	7 May 2008	Estonia	1–2	Yerevan	Clay	Singles 1	Vladimir Ivanov	2–6, 6–7^{(5–7)} (L)
RR	11 May 2008	Moldova	0–3	Yerevan	Clay	Singles 2	Andrei Gorban	1–6, 2–6 (L)
RR	11 May 2008	Moldova	0–3	Yerevan	Clay	Doubles (with Mindaugas Čeledinas)	Albot & Ciumac	3–6, 2–6 (L)
2010 Davis Cup Europe/Africa Zone Group II
Round	Date	Opponents	Tie score	Venue	Surface	Match	Opponent	Rubber score
1R	5–7 March 2010	Great Britain	3–2	Vilnius	Hard (i)	Singles 1	James Ward	4–6, 2–6, 4–6 (L)
1R	5–7 March 2010	Great Britain	3–2	Vilnius	Hard (i)	Doubles (with Dovydas Šakinis)	Fleming & Skupski	0–6, 7–6^{(7–2)}, 5–7, 3–6 (L)
1R	5–7 March 2010	Great Britain	3–2	Vilnius	Hard (i)	Singles 5	Daniel Evans	6–7^{(6–8)}, 7–5, 6–0, 2–6, 6–4 (W)
2R	9–11 July 2010	Ireland	3–2	Dublin	Carpet (i)	Singles 2	Conor Niland	6–2, 6–3, 6–1 (W)
2R	9–11 July 2010	Ireland	3–2	Dublin	Carpet (i)	Doubles (with Ričardas Berankis)	Cluskey & King	6–3, 6–3, 6–4 (W)
3R	17–19 September 2010	Slovenia	2–3	Vilnius	Hard	Singles 2	Grega Žemlja	3–6, 6–7^{(4–7)}, 3–6 (L)
3R	17–19 September 2010	Slovenia	2–3	Vilnius	Hard	Doubles (with Ričardas Berankis)	Gregorc & Žemlja	5–7, 4–6, 6–1, 6–3, 6–3 (W)
3R	17–19 September 2010	Slovenia	2–3	Vilnius	Hard	Singles 5	Blaž Kavčič	4–6, 6–7^{(4–7)}, 6–7^{(5–7)} (L)
2011 Davis Cup Europe/Africa Zone Group II
Round	Date	Opponents	Tie score	Venue	Surface	Match	Opponent	Rubber score
1R	4–6 March 2011	Estonia	2–3	Tallinn	Hard (i)	Singles 2	Jürgen Zopp	5–4 ret. (L)
2012 Davis Cup Europe Zone Group III
Round	Date	Opponents	Tie score	Venue	Surface	Match	Opponent	Rubber score
RR	3 May 2012	San Marino	3–0	Sofia	Clay	Singles 2	Marco de Rossi	6–2, 6–1 (W)
RR	4 May 2012	Andorra	2–0	Sofia	Clay	Singles 2	Jean-Baptiste Poux-Gautier	6–2, 6–4 (W)
PO	5 May 2012	Greece	2–1	Sofia	Clay	Singles 1	Theodoros Angelinos	5–7, 7–6^{(10–8)}, 4–6 (L)
PO	5 May 2012	Greece	2–1	Sofia	Clay	Doubles (with Ričardas Berankis)	Gemouchidis & Kalovelonis	6–2, 7–5 (W)
2014 Davis Cup Europe/Africa Zone Group II
Round	Date	Opponents	Tie score	Venue	Surface	Match	Opponent	Rubber score
1R	31 January–2 February 2014	Norway	5–0	Oslo	Hard (i)	Singles 1	Joachim Bjerke	6–7^{(4–7)}, 6–3, 6–3, 6–2 (W)
1R	31 January–2 February 2014	Norway	5–0	Oslo	Hard (i)	Doubles (with Ričardas Berankis)	Boretti & Durasovic	6–1, 6–4, 7–5 (W)
2R	4–6 April 2014	South Africa	3–2	Centurion, Gauteng	Hard	Singles 1	Rik de Voest	6–7^{(5–7)}, 6–7^{(3–7)}, 6–2, 6–7^{(4–7)} (L)
2R	4–6 April 2014	South Africa	3–2	Centurion, Gauteng	Hard	Doubles (with Ričardas Berankis)	Andersen & Klaasen	6–3, 3–6, 3–6, 6–7^{(5–7)} (L)
2R	4–6 April 2014	South Africa	3–2	Centurion, Gauteng	Hard	Singles 5	Ruan Roelofse	7–6^{(7–5)}, 3–6, 7–6^{(7–3)}, 6–4 (W)
3R	12–14 September 2014	Bosnia and Herzegovina	3–2	Sarajevo	Hard (i)	Singles 2	Damir Džumhur	7–6^{(7–5)}, 1–6, 1–6, 0–1, ret (L)
3R	12–14 September 2014	Bosnia and Herzegovina	3–2	Sarajevo	Hard (i)	Doubles (with Ričardas Berankis)	Bašić & Brkić	6–3, 6–3, 7–6^{(7–4)} (W)
