= 2009 Aegean Tennis Cup =

- Aegean Tennis Cup

Aegean Tennis Cup 2009

ATP Challenger Tour
- Event name: Rhodes
- Location: Rhodes, Greece
- Venue: Rhodes Tennis Club
- Category: ATP Challenger Tour, Tretorn SERIE+
- Surface: Hard
- Draw: 32S/32Q/16D
- Website: www.atcrhodes.com

The 2009 Aegean Tennis Cup was a professional tennis tournament played on outdoor hard courts. It was part of the Tretorn SERIE+ of the 2009 ATP Challenger Tour. It took place in Rhodes, Greece between April 27 and May 3, 2009.

== Champions ==
=== Men's singles ===
(Germany) Benjamin Becker def. (Germany) Simon Stadler, 7–5, 6–3

=== Men's doubles ===
(Slovakia) Karol Beck / (Czech Republic) Jaroslav Levinský def. (United States) Rajeev Ram / (United States) Bobby Reynolds, 6–3, 6–3

== Singles entrants ==
=== Seeds ===
Nationality	Player	Ranking*	Seeding
ISR	Dudi Sela	59	1
USA	Bobby Reynolds	78	2
USA	Kevin Kim	104	3
GER	Michael Berrer	111	4
UKR	Sergiy Stakhovsky	115	5
BRA	Thiago Alves	124	6
GER	Benjamin Becker	126	7
FRA	Nicolas Mahut	134	8

- Rankings are as of April 20, 2009.

=== Other entrants ===
The following players received wildcards into the singles main draw:

- (Greece) Theodoros Angelinos
- (Bulgaria) Grigor Dimitrov
- (Greece) Alexandros-Ferdinandos Georgoudas
- (Finland) Henri Kontinen

The following players received entry from the qualifying draw:

- (India) Rohan Bopanna
- (Canada) Pierre-Ludovic Duclos
- (Germany) Michael Kohlmann
- (Israel) Noam Okun

=== Top Greek Players ===
Year	Rhodian Players	Rest of Greece
2009	(Greece) Nikos Kontakis	(Greece) Theodoros Angelinos (Greece) Alexandros Georgoudas
