= Ixian Grand Aegean Tennis Cup =

ATP Challenger Tour
- Event name: Rhodes
- Location: Rhodes, Greece
- Venue: Rhodes Tennis Club
- Category: ATP Challenger Tour, Tretorn SERIE+
- Surface: Hard
- Draw: 32S/32Q/16D
- Prize money: €85,000+H
- Website: www.atcrhodes.com

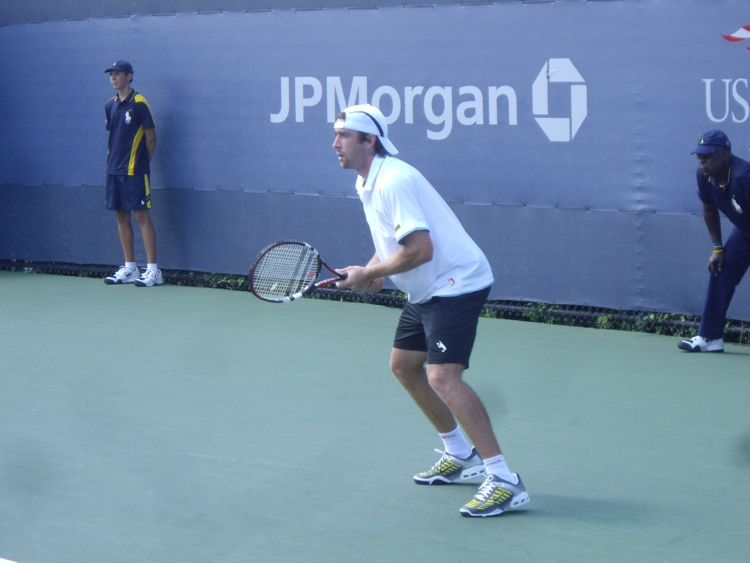
Benjamin Becker came out the winner of the all-German singles final of the inaugural Rhodes tournament

The Ixian Grand Aegean Tennis Cup is a professional tennis tournament played on outdoor hard courts. It is currently part of the ATP Challenger Tour. It is held annually at the Rhodes Tennis Club in Rhodes, Greece, since 2009.

== Past finals ==
=== Singles ===
Year	Champion	Runner-up	Score
2010	(Israel) Dudi Sela	(Germany) Rainer Schüttler	7–6(3), 6–3
2009	(Germany) Benjamin Becker	(Germany) Simon Stadler	7–5, 6–3

=== Doubles ===
Year	Champions	Runners-up	Score
2010	(Jamaica) Dustin Brown (Germany) Simon Stadler	(United Kingdom) Jonathan Marray (United Kingdom) Jamie Murray	7–6(4), 6–7(4), [10–7]
2009	(Slovakia) Karol Beck (Czech Republic) Jaroslav Levinský	(United States) Rajeev Ram (United States) Bobby Reynolds	6–3, 6–3

== Singles seeds & wild cards 2010, 2009 ==
=== Seeds 2010 ===
Nationality	Player	Ranking*	Seeding
SUI	Marco Chiudinelli	56	1
ISR	Dudi Sela	70	2
GER	Rainer Schüttler	99	3
TPE	Lu Yen-hsun	102	4
JAM	Dustin Brown	105	5
ISR	Harel Levy	124	6
SUI	Stéphane Bohli	132	7
GER	Björn Phau	142	8

- Rankings are as of April 19, 2010.

=== Other entrants ===
The following players received wildcards into the singles main draw:

- (Greece) Paris Gemouchidis
- (Greece) Alexandros Jakupovic
- (Greece) Theodoros Angelinos
- (Greece) Konstantinos Economidis

The following players received entry from the qualifying draw:

- (Germany) Denis Gremelmayr
- (Russia) Mikhail Ledovskikh
- (Latvia) Andis Juška
- (Slovakia) Andrej Martin

=== Seeds 2009 ===
Nationality	Player	Ranking*	Seeding
ISR	Dudi Sela	59	1
USA	Bobby Reynolds	78	2
USA	Kevin Kim	104	3
GER	Michael Berrer	111	4
UKR	Sergiy Stakhovsky	115	5
BRA	Thiago Alves	124	6
GER	Benjamin Becker	126	7
FRA	Nicolas Mahut	134	8

- Rankings are as of April 20, 2009.

=== Other entrants ===
The following players received wildcards into the singles main draw:

- (Greece) Theodoros Angelinos
- (Bulgaria) Grigor Dimitrov
- (Greece) Alexandros-Ferdinandos Georgoudas
- (Finland) Henri Kontinen

The following players received entry from the qualifying draw:

- (India) Rohan Bopanna
- (Canada) Pierre-Ludovic Duclos
- (Germany) Michael Kohlmann
- (Israel) Noam Okun

=== Top Greek players ===
Year	Rhodian players	Rest of Greece
2010	(Greece) Nikos Kontakis	(Greece) Paris Gemouchidis (Greece) Alexandros Jakupovic (Greece) Theodoros Angelinos (Greece) Konstantinos Economidis (Greece) Charalampos Kapogiannis
2009	(Greece) Nikos Kontakis	(Greece) Theodoros Angelinos (Greece) Alexandros Georgoudas
