= Paris Gemouchidis =

Greek tennis player

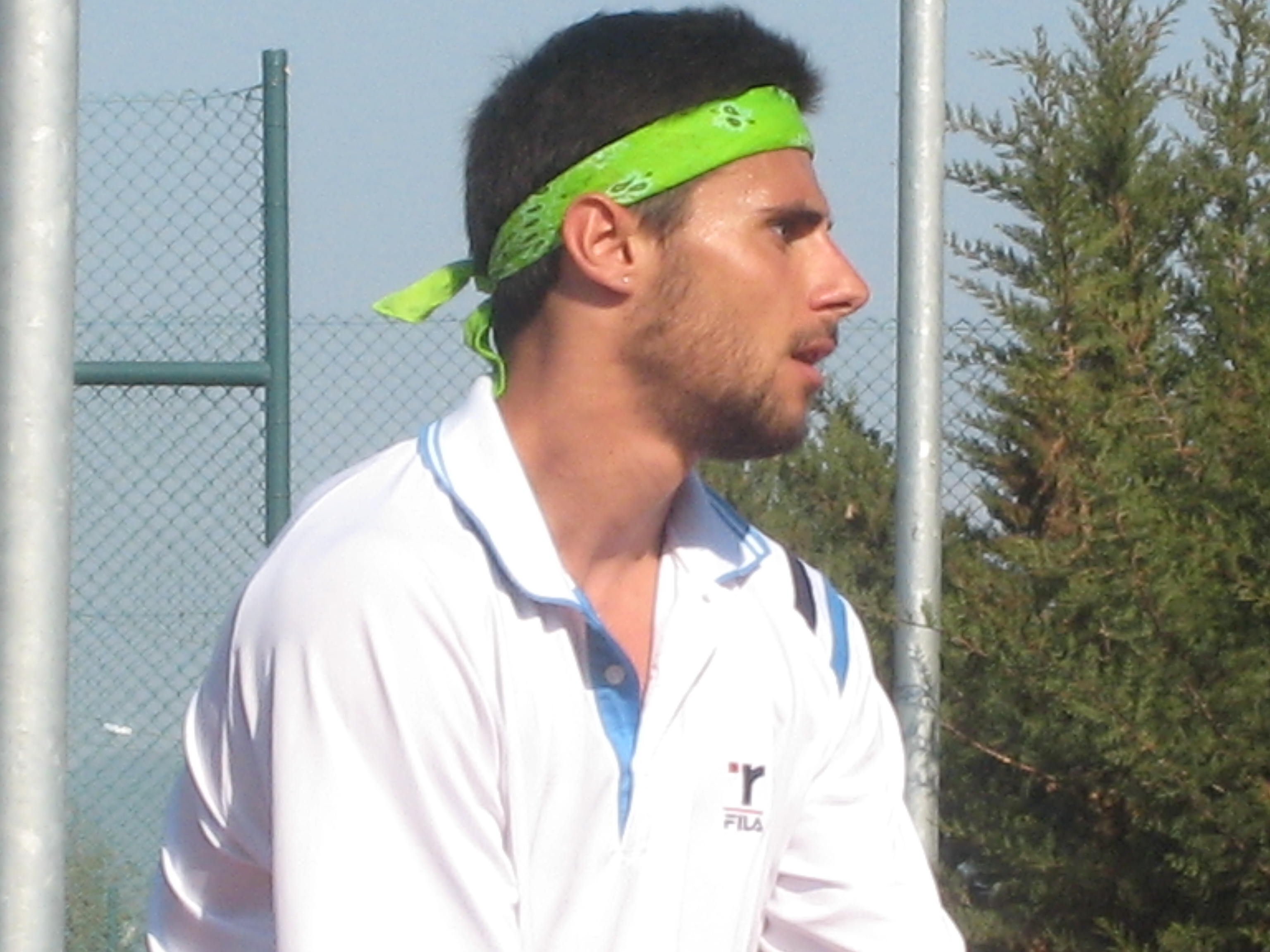
- Country (sports): Greece
- Born: 12 February 1988 (age 38) Athens, Greece
- Height: 5 ft 9 in (175 cm)
- Plays: Right-handed
- Prize money: $31,927

Singles
- Career record: 2–7 (Davis Cup)
- Highest ranking: No. 582 (11 July 2011)

Doubles
- Career record: 1–2 (Davis Cup)
- Highest ranking: No. 384 (29 August 2011)

Paris Gemouchidis (Greek: Πάρις Γεμουχίδης; born 12 February 1988) is a Greek tennis player.

Gemouchidis's career high singles rank is World No. 582, which he achieved on 11 July 2011. As of May 27, 2013, on the Futures singles level, he has 7 quarterfinal finishes, 2 semifinal finishes, and 3 runners-up. He has been much more successful in doubles, where he has 15 semifinal finishes, 12 runners-up and 8 titles. His 8 titles came in May 2008 in Heraklion, Greece, in July 2011 in Pitesti, Romania and İzmir, Turkey, in June 2012 in Tekirdağ, Turkey, with Alex Jakupovic of Greece, in June 2012 in Viterbo, Italy, and July 2012 in Bucharest and Pitesti, Romania, with Theodoros Angelinos of Greece, and in June 2010 in Cologne, Germany with Hans Podlipnik-Castillo of Chile. His career high doubles rank is World No. 384, which he achieved on 29 August 2011.

Gemouchidis had more success on the junior tour, where his career high rank was World No. 23, achieved on 22 May 2006. As of 2008, He is the only person in the history of tennis to start from the qualifying rounds of the prestigious Orange Bowl to reach the final.

Gemouchidis participated in the main draw of all Junior Grand Slams, twice (2005–2006), in Australian Open and once (2006), in Roland Garros, Wimbledon and US Open. He has also had success in numerous other junior tournaments.

- National Junior's Champion: (1998, 2000, 2001, 2002, 2003, 2004, 2005)
- National Men's Champion: (2010, 2014, 2015, 2018)

== Davis Cup ==
Gemouchidis is a member of the Greece Davis Cup team, having posted a 2–7 record in singles and a 1–2 record in doubles in eight ties played.
