= Mirza Bašić =

Bosnian tennis player

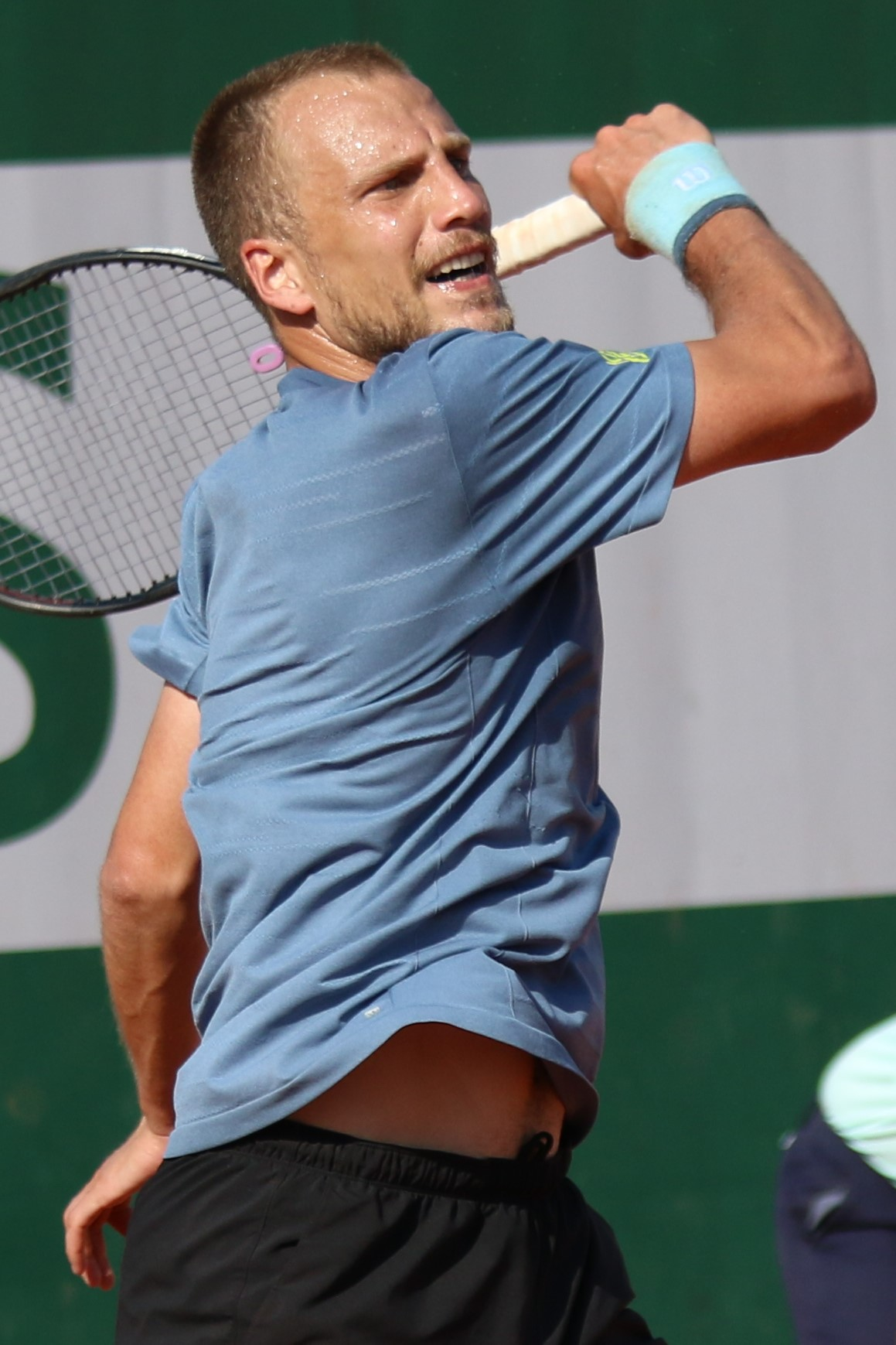
- Bašić at the 2022 French Open
- Country (sports): Bosnia and Herzegovina
- Residence: Sarajevo, Bosnia and Herzegovina
- Born: 12 July 1991 (age 35) Sarajevo, SR Bosnia and Herzegovina, SFR Yugoslavia
- Height: 1.88 m (6 ft 2 in)
- Turned pro: 2012
- Plays: Right-handed (two-handed backhand)
- Coach: Damir Bašić, Daniel Meyers
- Prize money: US$ 1,302,760

Singles
- Career record: 34–44
- Career titles: 1
- Highest ranking: No. 74 (19 February 2018)
- Current ranking: No. 602 (13 July 2026)

Grand Slam singles results
- Australian Open: 2R (2016)
- French Open: 1R (2018)
- Wimbledon: 1R (2018)
- US Open: 1R (2018)

Doubles
- Career record: 21–16
- Career titles: 0
- Highest ranking: No. 203 (28 January 2019)
- Current ranking: No. 392 (13 July 2026)

Grand Slam doubles results
- Australian Open: 1R (2019)
- French Open: 2R (2018)
- Wimbledon: 2R (2018)
- US Open: 1R (2018)
- Last updated on: 15 July 2026.

Mirza Bašić (Bosnian pronunciation: [bâʃitɕ]; born 12 July 1991) is a Bosnian professional tennis player. He has a career-high ATP singles ranking of No. 74, achieved on 19 February 2018 and a best doubles ranking of No. 203, achieved on 28 January 2019.

Bašić has won one ATP Tour singles title at the 2018 Sofia Open. He is a member of the Bosnia and Herzegovina Davis Cup team.

== Career ==
Bašić reached his first Grand Slam tournament after qualifying for the 2016 Australian Open and defeated Robin Haase. He became the second male player representing Bosnia and Herzegovina, after compatriot Damir Džumhur, to reach the main draw of a Grand Slam and record a major win.

In 2018, Bašić won his first ATP World Tour title at the Sofia Open as a qualifier, and reached the top 100 climbing 50 positions up in the rankings at world No. 76 on 12 February 2018. He entered the 2022 edition of the same tournament as a lucky loser.

== Performance timeline ==
Key
W	F	SF	QF	#R	RR	Q#	P#	DNQ	A	Z#	PO	G	S	B	NMS	NTI	P	NH

(W) winner; (F) finalist; (SF) semifinalist; (QF) quarterfinalist; (#R) rounds 4, 3, 2, 1; (RR) round-robin stage; (Q#) qualification round; (P#) preliminary round; (DNQ) did not qualify; (A) absent; (Z#) Davis/Fed Cup Zonal Group (with number indication) or (PO) play-off; (G) gold, (S) silver or (B) bronze Olympic/Paralympic medal; (NMS) not a Masters tournament; (NTI) not a Tier I tournament; (P) postponed; (NH) not held; (SR) strike rate (events won / competed); (W–L) win–loss record.
To avoid confusion and double counting, these charts are updated at the conclusion of a tournament or when the player's participation has ended.

Current as far as the 2022 Wimbledon Championships.

Tournament	2011	2012	2013	2014	2015	2016	2017	2018	2019	2020	2021	2022	W–L
Grand Slam tournaments
Australian Open	A	A	Q1	Q1	A	2R	Q2	Q1	1R	A	A	Q1	1–1
French Open	A	A	Q1	A	Q1	Q2	Q2	1R	Q2	A	A	Q1	0–1
Wimbledon	A	A	Q2	A	Q1	Q1	Q1	1R	Q1	NH	A	Q1	0–1
US Open	A	A	Q2	A	Q2	Q1	Q2	1R	Q3	A	A	A	0–1
Win–loss	0–0	0–0	0–0	0–0	0–0	1–1	0–0	0–3	0–1	0–0	0–0	0–0	1–5

== ATP Tour finals ==
=== Singles: 1 (title) ===
Legend Grand Slam (0–0) ATP 1000 (0–0) ATP 500 (0–0) ATP 250 (1–0)	Finals by surface Hard (1–0) Clay (0–0) Grass (0–0)	Finals by setting Outdoor (0–0) Indoor (1–0)

Result	W–L	Date	Tournament	Tier	Surface	Opponent	Score
Win	1–0	Feb 2018	Sofia Open, Bulgaria	ATP 250	Hard (i)	(Romania) Marius Copil	7–6^{(8–6)}, 6–7^{(4–7)}, 6–4

== National representation ==
=== Davis Cup ===
Group membership World Group (0–0) Group I (4–3) Group II (14–5) Group III (9–6) Group IV (0–0)	Matches by surface Hard (8–5) Clay (14–9) Grass (0–0) Carpet (5–0)	Matches by Location Outdoor (16–8) Indoor (11–6)	Matches by Type Singles (12–8) Doubles (15–6)

- ▲ ▼ indicates the outcome of the Davis Cup match followed by the score, date, place of event, the zonal classification and its phase, and the court surface.

Davis Cup results
Rubber outcome	No.	Rubber	Match type (partner if any)	Opponent nation	Opponent player(s)	Score
▼1–2; 9–11 May 2007; Smash Tennis Academy, Cairo, Egypt; Europe/Africa Group A round robin; Clay
Victory	1.	III (dead rubber)	Doubles (with Zlatan Kadrić)	Moldova	Radu Albot / Evghenii Plugariov	6–3, 3–6, 6–3
▼1–2; 9–11 May 2007; Smash Tennis Academy, Cairo, Egypt; Europe/Africa Group A round robin; Clay
Defeat	2.	I	Singles	Lithuania	Daniel Lencina-Ribes	7–6^{(7–5)}, 6–1
Victory	3.	III (dead rubber)	Doubles (with Uglješa Ostojić)	Lithuania	Ričardas Berankis / Gvidas Sabeckis	6–3, 6–3
▼1–2; 9–11 May 2007; Smash Tennis Academy, Cairo, Egypt; Europe/Africa Group A round robin; Clay
Defeat	4.	III (dead rubber)	Doubles (with Uglješa Ostojić)	(Republic of Ireland) Ireland	John McGahon / Kevin Sorensen	3–6, 4–6
▲3–0; 12–13 May 2007; Smash Tennis Academy, Cairo, Egypt; Europe/Africa 5th to 8th play-off; Clay
Victory	5.	I	Singles	Iceland	Jon-Axel Jonsson	6–1, 6–1
▲3–0; 7–9 May 2008; Masterclass Tennis & Fitness Club, Yerevan, Armenia; Europe/Africa Group B round robin; Clay
Victory	6.	III (dead rubber)	Doubles (with Tomislav Brkić)	Ghana	Emmanuel Mensah / Mohammed Salifu	6–4, 7–6^{(8–6)}
▲3–0; 7–9 May 2008; Masterclass Tennis & Fitness Club, Yerevan, Armenia; Europe/Africa Group B round robin; Clay
Victory	7.	III (dead rubber)	Doubles (with Tomislav Brkić)	Estonia	Mait Künnap / Jürgen Zopp	7–5, 7–6^{(7–2)}
▼1–2; 7–9 May 2008; Masterclass Tennis & Fitness Club, Yerevan, Armenia; Europe/Africa Group B round robin; Clay
Victory	8.	III (dead rubber)	Doubles (with Tomislav Brkić)	Lithuania	Daniel Lencina-Ribes / Gvidas Sabeckis	6–3, 6–7^{(5–7)}, 6–3
▼0–3; 10–11 May 2008; Masterclass Tennis & Fitness Club, Yerevan, Armenia; Europe/Africa 1st to 4th play-off; Clay
Defeat	9.	I	Singles	Moldova	Andrei Gorban	1–6, 0–6
Defeat	10.	III (dead rubber)	Doubles (with Tomislav Brkić)	Moldova	Roman Borvanov / Andrei Ciumac	6–7^{(5–7)}, 6–2, 3–6
▼1–2; 10–11 May 2008; Masterclass Tennis & Fitness Club, Yerevan, Armenia; Europe/Africa 1st to 4th Play-Off; Clay
Defeat	11.	II	Singles	Norway	Stian Boretti	5–7, 2–6
Victory	12.	III (dead rubber)	Doubles (with Tomislav Brkić)	Norway	Fredrik Ask / Frederik Sletting-Johnsen	7–6^{(7–3)}, 6–4
▲3–0; 1–3 April 2009; Avenir Sportif de la Marsa, La Marsa, Tunisia; Europe/Africa Group B round robin; Clay
Victory	13.	III (dead rubber)	Doubles (with Tomislav Brkić)	Namibia	Jean Erasmus / Jurgens Strydom	6–2, 6–3
▲3–0; 1–3 April 2009; Avenir Sportif de la Marsa, La Marsa, Tunisia; Europe/Africa Group B round robin; Clay
Victory	14.	III (dead rubber)	Doubles (with Tomislav Brkić)	Andorra	Hector Hormigo-Herrera / Jordi Vila-Vila	6–3, 6–3
▲2–1; 1–3 April 2009; Avenir Sportif de la Marsa, La Marsa, Tunisia; Europe/Africa Group B round robin; Clay
Defeat	15.	III (dead rubber)	Doubles (with Tomislav Brkić)	Norway	Stian Boretti / Erling Tveit	4–6, 3–6
▲3–1; 31 January – 2 February 2014; Mojmilo Sports Hall, Sarajevo, Bosnia and Herzegovina; Europe/Africa first round; Carpet (indoor)
Victory	16.	I	Singles	Greece	Alexandros Jakupovic	6–3, 6–2, 6–2
Victory	17.	III	Doubles (with Tomislav Brkić)	Greece	Alexandros Jakupovic / Markos Kalovelonis	5–7, 6–0, 6–4, 7–5
▲3–2; 4–6 April 2014; Tali Tennis Center, Helsinki, Finland; Europe/Africa second round; Hard (indoor)
Victory	18.	II	Singles	Finland	Jarkko Nieminen	3–6, 7–6^{(7–3)}, 3–6, 6–3, 8–6
Defeat	19.	III	Doubles (with Tomislav Brkić)	Finland	Henri Kontinen / Jarkko Nieminen	3–6, 6–7^{(4–7)}, 2–6
Victory	20.	IV	Singles	Finland	Juho Paukku	3–6, 4–6, 6–3, 7–5, 6–4
▼2–3; 12–14 September 2014; Mojmilo Sports Hall, Sarajevo, Bosnia and Herzegovina; Europe/Africa third round; Hard (indoor)
Defeat	21.	I	Singles	Lithuania	Ričardas Berankis	7–5, 6–3, 4–6, 4–6, 4–6
Defeat	22.	III	Doubles (with Tomislav Brkić)	Lithuania	Ričardas Berankis / Laurynas Grigelis	3–6, 2–6, 6–7^{(4–7)}
▲4–1; 6–8 March 2015; Harare Sports Club, Harare, Zimbabwe; Europe/Africa first round; Hard
Victory	23.	I	Singles	Zimbabwe	Takanyi Garanganga	6–3, 6–3, 7–6^{(8–6)}
Victory	24.	III	Doubles (with Tomislav Brkić)	Zimbabwe	Wayne Black / Mark Fynn	6–3, 3–6, 6–3, 6–4
▼2–3; 17–19 July 2015; Siófok KC, Siófok, Hungary; Europe/Africa second round; Clay
Victory	25.	II	Singles	Hungary	Péter Nagy	4–6, 6–4, 6–3, 6–3
Victory	26.	III	Doubles (with Amer Delić)	Hungary	Márton Fucsovics / Levente Gödry	3–6, 7–6^{(10–8)}, 6–4, 6–0
Defeat	27.	IV	Singles	Hungary	Márton Fucsovics	7–6^{(7–3)}, 1–6, 3–6, 2–6
▲3–1; 4–6 March 2016; Arena Zenica, Zenica, Bosnia and Herzegovina; Europe/Africa first round; Carpet (Indoor)
Victory	28.	I	Singles	Tunisia	Anis Ghorbel	6–2, 6–4, 6–2
Victory	29.	III	Doubles (with Tomislav Brkić)	Tunisia	Malek Jaziri / Skander Mansouri	6–7^{(2–7)}, 4–6, 6–3, 7–5, 6–4
Victory	30.	IV	Singles	Tunisia	Malek Jaziri	5–7, 4–6, 7–6^{(8–6)}, 7–6^{(18–16)}, 6–3
▲3–1; 15–17 July 2016; Javna ustanova za sport, odmor i rekreaciju, Bihać, Bosnia and Herzegovina; Europe/Africa second round; Clay
Defeat	31.	II	Singles	Turkey	Marsel İlhan	6–7^{(9–11)}, 7–5, 6–2, 3–6, 5–7
Victory	32.	III	Doubles (with Tomislav Brkić)	Turkey	Tuna Altuna / Cem İlkel	6–2, 6–4, 6–1
▲5–0; 16–18 September 2016; Siemens Arena, Vilnius, Lithuania; Europe/Africa third round; Hard (indoor)
Victory	33.	II	Singles	Lithuania	Laurynas Grigelis	7–6^{(7–5)}, 7–6^{(7–0)}, 3–6, 6–3
Victory	34.	III	Doubles (with Tomislav Brkić)	Lithuania	Laurynas Grigelis / Lukas Mugevičius	6–4, 6–4, 6–2
▲5–0; 3–5 February 2017; Arena Zenica, Zenica, Bosnia and Herzegovina; Europe/Africa first round; Hard (indoor)
Victory	35.	I	Singles	Poland	Kamil Majchrzak	6–4, 6–3, ret.
Victory	36.	III	Doubles (with Tomislav Brkić)	Poland	Łukasz Kubot / Marcin Matkowski	7–6^{(7–5)}, 7–6^{(7–5)}, 3–6, 4–6, 6–3
▼1–3; 7–9 April 2017; Arena Zenica, Zenica, Bosnia and Herzegovina; Europe/Africa Second round; Hard (indoor)
Defeat	37.	I	Singles	Netherlands	Robin Haase	4–6, 2–6, 7–5, 3–6
Defeat	38.	III	Doubles (with Tomislav Brkić)	Netherlands	Robin Haase / Jean-Julien Rojer	3–6, 6–3, 3–6, 2–6
▲3–2; 6–7 April 2018; Aegon Arena, Bratislava, Slovakia; Europe/Africa second round; Clay (indoor)
Defeat	39.	II	Singles	Slovakia	Martin Kližan	6–7^{(5–7)}, 1–6
Victory	40.	III	Doubles (with Tomislav Brkić)	Slovakia	Andrej Martin / Igor Zelenay	6–2, 6–4
Victory	41.	V	Singles	Slovakia	Jozef Kovalík	7–6^{(7–0)}, 2–6, 6–3

== ATP Challenger Tour finals ==
=== Singles: 6 (2 titles, 4 runner-ups) ===
Legend ATP Challenger Tour (2–4)	Finals by surface Hard (2–4) Clay (0–0)

Result	W–L	Date	Tournament	Tier	Surface	Opponent	Score
Loss	0–1	Nov 2012	Keio Challenger, Japan	Challenger	Hard	(Italy) Matteo Viola	6–7^{(3–7)}, 3–6
Loss	0–2	Feb 2015	Wrocław Open, Poland	Challenger	Hard (i)	(Uzbekistan) Farrukh Dustov	3–6, 4–6
Win	1–2	Jul 2015	Guzzini Challenger, Italy	Challenger	Hard	(Lithuania) Ričardas Berankis	6–4, 3–6, 7–6^{(7–4)}
Loss	1–3	Nov 2015	Trofeo di Brescia, Italy	Challenger	Hard (i)	(Netherlands) Igor Sijsling	4–6, 4–6
Win	2–3	Mar 2017	Jalisco Open, Mexico	Challenger	Hard	(Canada) Denis Shapovalov	6–4, 6–4
Loss	2–4	Jul 2017	Guzzini Challenger, Italy	Challenger	Hard	(Croatia) Viktor Galović	6–7^{(3–7)}, 4–6

=== Doubles: 6 (1 title, 5 runner-ups) ===
Legend ATP Challenger Tour (1–5)	Finals by surface Hard (1–3) Clay (0–2)

Result	W–L	Date	Tournament	Tier	Surface	Partner	Opponents	Score
Win	1–0	Mar 2013	BH Indoors, Bosnia and Herzegovina	Challenger	Hard (i)	(Bosnia and Herzegovina) Tomislav Brkić	(Slovakia) Karol Beck (Slovakia) Igor Zelenay	6–3, 7–5
Loss	1–1	Nov 2015	Trofeo di Brescia, Italy	Challenger	Hard (i)	(Croatia) Nikola Mektić	(Serbia) Ilija Bozoljac (Slovakia) Igor Zelenay	0–6, 3–6
Loss	1–2	Jan 2019	Burnie International, Australia	Challenger	Hard	(Bosnia and Herzegovina) Tomislav Brkić	(South Africa) Lloyd Harris (Israel) Dudi Sela	3–6, 7–6^{(7–3)}, [8–10]
Loss	1–3	Oct 2021	Napoli Cup, Italy	Challenger	Clay	(Croatia) Nino Serdarušić	(Germany) Dustin Brown (Italy) Andrea Vavassori	5–7, 6–7^{(5–7)}
Loss	1–4	Feb 2026	Challenger Città di Lugano, Switzerland	Challenger	Hard (i)	(Bosnia and Herzegovina) Nerman Fatić	(Serbia) Stefan Latinović (Ukraine) Vitaliy Sachko	3–6, 4–6
Loss	1–5	Mar 2026	Split Open, Croatia	Challenger	Clay	(Bosnia and Herzegovina) Andrej Nedić	(Slovakia) Miloš Karol (Croatia) Mili Poljičak	2–6, 2–6

== ITF Tour finals ==
=== Singles: 24 (12–12) ===
Legend ITF Futures/WTT (10–8)	Finals by surface Hard (2–3) Clay (7–5) Carpet (1–0)

Result	W–L	Date	Tournament	Tier	Surface	Opponent	Score
Win	1–0	Jun 2010	Bosnia and Herzegovina F7, Kiseljak	Futures	Clay	(Netherlands) Miliaan Niesten	6–3, 6–0
Loss	1–1	Feb 2011	Croatia F1, Zagreb	Futures	Hard (i)	(Germany) Marcel Zimmermann	3–6, 7–5, 4–6
Loss	1–2	May 2011	Bosnia and Herzegovina F4, Prijedor	Futures	Clay	(Bosnia and Herzegovina) Tomislav Brkić	4–6, 5–7
Win	2–2	Sep 2011	Serbia F9, Novi Sad	Futures	Clay	(Italy) Edoardo Eremin	7–6^{(8–6)}, 6–3
Loss	2–3	Jan 2012	Great Britain F1, Glasgow	Futures	Hard (i)	(Poland) Michał Przysiężny	1–6, 6–7^{(7–9)}
Win	3–3	Oct 2012	Turkey F39, Antalya	Futures	Hard	(Slovakia) Norbert Gombos	6–4, 6–4
Win	4–3	Mar 2013	Italy F1, Trento	Futures	Carpet (i)	(Italy) Matteo Trevisan	7–6^{(7–4)}, 1–6, 6–2
Win	5–3	Apr 2013	France F8, Ajaccio	Futures	Clay	(France) Romain Jouan	6–4, 6–4
Win	6–3	Dec 2013	Turkey F48, Antalya	Futures	Hard	(United Kingdom) Edward Corrie	7–5, 6–4
Loss	6–4	May 2014	Bosnia and Herzegovina F1, Doboj	Futures	Clay	(Slovakia) Adrian Partl	4–6, 4–6
Win	7–4	Jun 2014	Bosnia and Herzegovina F4, Kiseljak	Futures	Clay	(Bosnia and Herzegovina) Tomislav Brkić	7–5, 6–4
Loss	7–5	May 2023	M15 Krško, Slovenia	WTT	Clay	(Germany) Lucas Gerch	4–6, 1–6
Win	8–5	Jun 2024	M25 Sarajevo, Bosnia and Herzegovina	WTT	Clay	(Switzerland) Jakub Paul	6–1, 7–5
Loss	8–6	Oct 2024	M15 Kayseri, Turkey	WTT	Hard	(Germany) Tom Gentzsch	2–6, 4–6
Loss	8–7	Feb 2025	M15 Antalya, Turkey	WTT	Clay	(Italy) Alexander Weis	2–6, 5–7
Win	9–7	Jun 2025	M15 Zagreb, Croatia	WTT	Clay	(Croatia) Josip Šimundža	6–7^{(4–7)}, 7–6^{(7–4)}, 6–4
Win	10–7	Jul 2025	M15 Kuršumlijska Banja, Serbia	WTT	Clay	(Italy) Tommaso Compagnucci	6–4, 6–2
Loss	10–8	Aug 2025	M25 Maribor, Slovenia	WTT	Clay	(Hungary) Máté Valkusz	2–6, 6–3, 1–6

=== Doubles: 4 (2 titles, 2 runner-ups) ===
Legend ITF Futures (2–2)	Finals by surface Hard (0–1) Clay (2–1)

Result	W–L	Date	Tournament	Tier	Surface	Partner	Opponents	Score
Loss	0–1	May 2010	Bosnia and Herzegovina F4, Sarajevo	Futures	Clay	(Bosnia and Herzegovina) Zlatan Kadrić	(Serbia) Dušan Lajović (Serbia) Miljan Zekić	3–6, 4–6
Loss	0–2	Feb 2012	Croatia F1, Zagreb	Futures	Hard (i)	(Croatia) Mate Delić	(Romania) Andrei Dăescu (Romania) Florin Mergea	5–7, 1–6
Win	1–2	Aug 2012	Italy F22, Appiano	Futures	Clay	(Serbia) Nikola Ćirić	(Italy) Andrea Arnaboldi (Italy) Alessandro Motti	6–3, 6–7^{(5–7)}, [10–6]
Win	2–2	Aug 2014	Italy F27, Appiano	Futures	Clay	(Bosnia and Herzegovina) Tomislav Brkić	(Belgium) Yannik Reuter (France) Maxime Teixeira	6–3, 6–4
