= Trofeo Città di Brescia =

- 2017 Trofeo Città di Brescia

Defunct tennis tournament
- Location: Brescia, Italy
- Venue: Centro Sportivo San Filippo
- Category: ATP Challenger Tour
- Surface: Carpet / Indoor
- Draw: 32S/16Q/16D
- Prize money: €42,500+H
- Website: website

The Trofeo Città di Brescia was a tennis tournament held in Brescia, Italy from 2014 until 2017. The event was part of the ATP Challenger Tour and was played on indoor carpet courts.

== Past finals ==
=== Singles ===
Year	Champion	Runner-up	Score
2017	(Slovakia) Lukáš Lacko	(Lithuania) Laurynas Grigelis	6–1, 6–2
2016	(Italy) Luca Vanni	(Lithuania) Laurynas Grigelis	6–7^{(5–7)}, 6–4, 7–6^{(10–8)}
2015	(Netherlands) Igor Sijsling	(Bosnia and Herzegovina) Mirza Bašić	6–4, 6–4
2014	(Ukraine) Illya Marchenko	(Uzbekistan) Farrukh Dustov	6–4, 5–7, 6–2

=== Doubles ===
Year	Champions	Runners-up	Score
2017	(Netherlands) Sander Arends (Belgium) Sander Gillé	(Switzerland) Luca Margaroli (Austria) Tristan-Samuel Weissborn	6–2, 6–3
2016	(Russia) Mikhail Elgin (Russia) Alexander Kudryavtsev	(Netherlands) Wesley Koolhof (Netherlands) Matwé Middelkoop	7–6^{(7–4)}, 6–3
2015	(Serbia) Ilija Bozoljac (Slovakia) Igor Zelenay	(Bosnia and Herzegovina) Mirza Bašić (Croatia) Nikola Mektić	6–0, 6–3
2014	(Ukraine) Illya Marchenko (Ukraine) Denys Molchanov	(Czech Republic) Roman Jebavý (Poland) Błażej Koniusz	7–6^{(7–4)}, 6–3
