= Theodoros Angelinos =

Greek tennis player

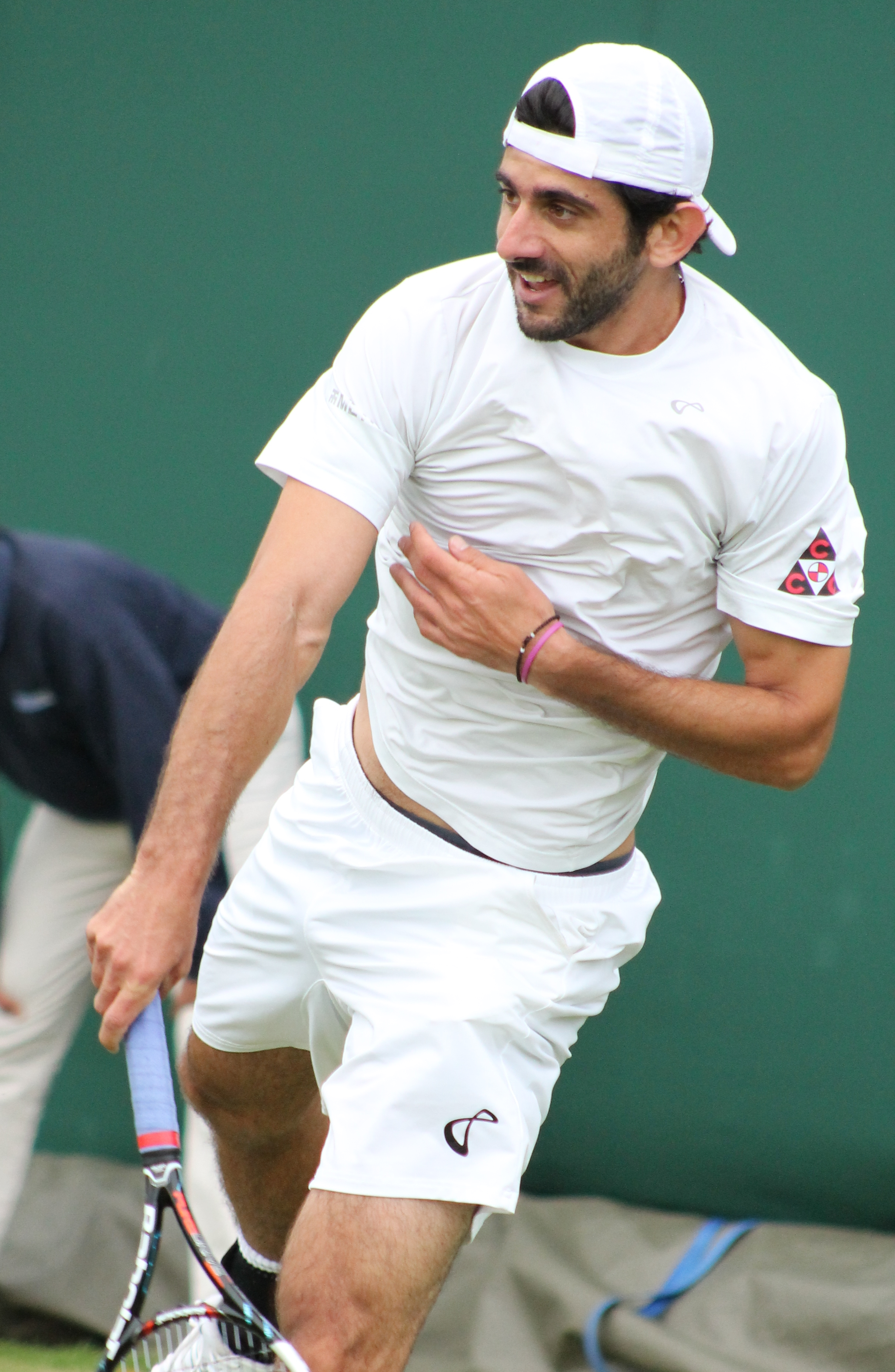
- Country (sports): Greece
- Born: 29 May 1984 (age 41) Athens, Greece
- Plays: Right-handed (double-handed backhand)
- College: Virginia
- Prize money: $90,621

Singles
- Career record: 1–3 (at ATP Tour level, Grand Slam level, and in Davis Cup)
- Highest ranking: No. 251 (2 December 2013)

Doubles
- Career record: 0–1 (at ATP Tour level, Grand Slam level, and in Davis Cup)
- Highest ranking: No. 373 (20 May 2013)
- Last updated on: 30 December 2022.

Theodoros Angelinos (Greek: Θεόδωρος Αγγελίνος; born 29 May 1984 in Athens, Greece), is a professional tennis player who participates in the ATP International Tennis Tour.

== Personal data ==
Angelinos is the son of Stratos and Eleni Angelinos. He is 6 foot 3 inches tall and weighs 182 pounds. He attended CMA University high school and the University of Virginia.

== Tennis career ==
2010 was the first year that Angelinos played professionally. He has to date, been nominated a total of five times. His final ranking for 2013 was 256. He garnered a top 1000 ATP ranking in singles and doubles and was a top junior player in Greece even when injured. Angelinos also trained at a high-level tennis academy in Valencia, Spain. He plays right-handed.

Angelinos has won $90.453 in prize money and has won 57.4% of all games played. Coach Klein says: "Ted's big-hitting game, height and athleticism make him a can't miss addition to the squad. He has a load of talent and his international experience in singles and doubles has impressed his teammates. He could become the first Greek tennis player to capture the attention of Division I college tennis."

== Titles ==
Angelinos has earned 7 ITF Future singles titles, the last in 2009.

== Games won ==
Win–loss	Win	Loss
Career Singles (ATP*/WTA Tour and ITF Pro Circuit main draw)	183	129
Career Doubles (ATP*/WTA Tour and ITF Pro Circuit main draw)	86	81
Career Singles (ITF Pro Circuit main draw)	164	102
Career Doubles (ITF Pro Circuit main draw)	82	61

== Year End ATP ranking ==
Ranking	Singles	Doubles
2014	514	1303
2013	292	516
2012	499	588
2011	839	-
2010	537	882
2009	480	1589
2005	1523	-
2004	1339	1028
2003	779	692
2002	-	1535
