= 2016 Pekao Szczecin Open – Doubles =

Doubles
- 2016 Pekao Szczecin Open

Final
- Champions: (Germany) Andre Begemann (Belarus) Aliaksandr Bury
- Runners-up: (Sweden) Johan Brunström (Sweden) Andreas Siljeström
- Score: 7–6^{(7–3)}, 6–7^{(7–9)}, [10–4]

Events
Singles	Doubles
← 2015 ·	Pekao Szczecin Open	· 2017 →

Tristan Lamasine and Fabrice Martin were the defending champions but chose not to defend their title.

Andre Begemann and Aliaksandr Bury won the title after defeating Johan Brunström and Andreas Siljeström 7–6^{(7–3)}, 6–7^{(7–9)}, [10–4] in the final.

== Seeds ==
1. (Netherlands) Wesley Koolhof / (Netherlands) Matwé Middelkoop (first round)
2. (Argentina) Guillermo Durán / (Argentina) Andrés Molteni (quarterfinals)
3. (United Kingdom) Colin Fleming / (Poland) Mariusz Fyrstenberg (semifinals)
4. (India) Purav Raja / (India) Divij Sharan (quarterfinals)

== Draw ==
=== Key ===
- Q = Qualifier
- WC = Wild card
- LL = Lucky loser
- Alt = Alternate
- SE = Special exempt
- PR = Protected ranking
- ITF = ITF entry
- JE = Junior exempt
- w/o = Walkover
- r = Retired
- d = Defaulted
- SR = Special ranking

First round
1	(Netherlands) W Koolhof (Netherlands) M Middelkoop	4	6	[8]
(Poland) T Bednarek (Australia) R Junaid	6	1	[10]
(Spain) Í Cervantes (Spain) A Montañés	6	2	[10]
(United Kingdom) K Skupski (United Kingdom) N Skupski	4	6	[5]
4	(India) P Raja (India) D Sharan	6	6
LL	(Netherlands) S Arends (Poland) A Majchrowicz	3	1
(Germany) D Brown (New Zealand) A Sitak	3	4
(Germany) A Begemann (Belarus) A Bury	6	6
WC	(Poland) Filip Ambrozy (Spain) M Granollers	2	4
WC	(Poland) Adrian Andrzejczuk (Poland) Mateusz Smolicki	6	6
WC	(Poland) Paweł Ciaś (Poland) P Matuszewski	6^{2}	4
3	(United Kingdom) C Fleming (Poland) M Fyrstenberg	7^{7}	6
Q	(Italy) F Gaio (Italy) S Napolitano	4	5
(Sweden) J Brunström (Sweden) A Siljeström	6	7
(Italy) A Motti (Chinese Taipei) H-y Peng	3	3
2	(Argentina) G Durán (Argentina) A Molteni	6	6

Quarterfinals
(Poland) T Bednarek (Australia) R Junaid	4	3
(Spain) Í Cervantes (Spain) A Montañés	6	6
4	(India) P Raja (India) D Sharan	3	7^{7}	[6]
(Germany) A Begemann (Belarus) A Bury	6	6^{2}	[10]
WC	(Poland) A Andrzejczuk (Poland) M Smolicki	3	2
3	(United Kingdom) C Fleming (Poland) M Fyrstenberg	6	6
(Sweden) J Brunström (Sweden) A Siljeström	4	6	[12]
2	(Argentina) G Durán (Argentina) A Molteni	6	4	[10]

Semifinals
(Spain) Í Cervantes (Spain) A Montañés
(Germany) A Begemann (Belarus) A Bury	w/o
3	(United Kingdom) C Fleming (Poland) M Fyrstenberg	6	1	[7]
(Sweden) J Brunström (Sweden) A Siljeström	2	6	[10]

Final
(Germany) A Begemann (Belarus) A Bury	7^{7}	6^{7}	[10]
(Sweden) J Brunström (Sweden) A Siljeström	6^{3}	7^{9}	[4]
