= 2016 Pekao Szczecin Open – Singles =

Singles
- 2016 Pekao Szczecin Open

Final
- Champion: (Italy) Alessandro Giannessi
- Runner-up: (Germany) Dustin Brown
- Score: 6–2, 6–3

Events
Singles	Doubles
← 2015 ·	Pekao Szczecin Open	· 2017 →

Jan-Lennard Struff was the defending champion but chose not to participate.

Alessandro Giannessi won the title after defeating Dustin Brown 6–2, 6–3 in the final.

== Seeds ==
1. (Spain) Marcel Granollers (first round, retired)
2. (Spain) Íñigo Cervantes (second round)
3. (Germany) Dustin Brown (final)
4. (Moldova) Radu Albot (first round)
5. (Georgia (country)) Nikoloz Basilashvili (first round)
6. (Russia) Teymuraz Gabashvili (first round)
7. (Spain) Albert Montañés (quarterfinals, retired)
8. (Italy) Marco Cecchinato (quarterfinals)

== Draw ==
=== Key ===
- Q = Qualifier
- WC = Wild card
- LL = Lucky loser
- Alt = Alternate
- SE = Special exempt
- PR = Protected ranking
- ITF = ITF entry
- JE = Junior exempt
- w/o = Walkover
- r = Retired
- d = Defaulted
- SR = Special ranking

=== Finals ===
Semifinals
Alt	(France) Jonathan Eysseric	4	4
3	(Germany) Dustin Brown	6	6
(Italy) Alessandro Giannessi	6	6
(France) Constant Lestienne	3	3

Final
3	(Germany) Dustin Brown	2	3
(Italy) Alessandro Giannessi	6	6

=== Top half ===
First round
1/WC	(Spain) M Granollers	6	4	0^{r}
Alt	(France) J Eysseric	3	6	2
Q	(Czech Republic) Petr Michnev	7	3
(France) G Sakharov	5	0^{r}
(Italy) Edoardo Eremin	3	4
WC	(Norway) C Ruud	6	6
PR	(Netherlands) B Westerhof	4	1
8	(Italy) M Cecchinato	6	6
3	(Germany) D Brown	6	6^{5}	6
Q	(Estonia) V Ivanov	3	7^{7}	2
(France) M Bourgue	7^{7}	6
Q	(Germany) J Reister	6^{1}	0
Q	(Germany) P Torebko	7	4	4
(Italy) S Caruso	5	6	6
(Czech Republic) Z Kolář	6	3	6
6	(Russia) T Gabashvili	1	6	3

Second round
Alt	(France) J Eysseric	3	6	6
Q	(Czech Republic) P Michnev	6	2	2
WC	(Norway) C Ruud	7	1	2
8	(Italy) M Cecchinato	5	6	6
3	(Germany) D Brown	6	6
(France) M Bourgue	1	1
(Italy) S Caruso	6	6
(Czech Republic) Z Kolář	4	3

Quarterfinals
Alt	(France) J Eysseric	6	6
8	(Italy) M Cecchinato	4	1
3	(Germany) D Brown	4	6	6
(Italy) S Caruso	6	3	3

Semifinals
Alt	(France) J Eysseric	4	4
3	(Germany) D Brown	6	6

=== Bottom half ===
First round
5	(Georgia (country)) N Basilashvili	5	6^{5}
(Poland) J Janowicz	7	7^{7}
Alt	(Italy) S Napolitano	4	6	6
(Czech Republic) J Mertl	6	3	2
(Japan) A Santillan	4	6	6
(Italy) L Sonego	6	1	2
(Italy) A Giannessi	6	6
4	(Moldova) R Albot	3	4
7	(Spain) A Montañés	3	7^{7}	6
WC	(Poland) Paweł Ciaś	6	6^{3}	2
(Russia) A Vatutin	6	6
WC	(Poland) M Przysiężny	4	1
(France) C Lestienne	6	7
(France) A Michon	4	5
(Italy) F Gaio	6^{6}	6	5
2	(Spain) Í Cervantes	7^{8}	1	7

Second round
(Poland) J Janowicz	6	6^{2}	4
Alt	(Italy) S Napolitano	3	7^{7}	6
(Japan) A Santillan	3	3
(Italy) A Giannessi	6	6
7	(Spain) A Montañés	0	7	6
(Russia) A Vatutin	6	5	4
(France) C Lestienne	6	7^{7}
2	(Spain) Í Cervantes	4	6^{5}

Quarterfinals
Alt	(Italy) S Napolitano	3	6^{10}
(Italy) A Giannessi	6	7^{12}
7	(Spain) A Montañés	3	7^{9}	4^{r}
(France) C Lestienne	6	6^{7}	5

Semifinals
(Italy) A Giannessi	6	6
(France) C Lestienne	3	3
