= 2012 Pekao Szczecin Open – Singles =

Singles
- 2012 Pekao Szczecin Open

Final
- Champion: (Romania) Victor Hănescu
- Runner-up: (Spain) Íñigo Cervantes Huegun
- Score: 6–4, 7–5

Events
Singles	Doubles
- Pekao Szczecin Open

Rui Machado was the defending champion but decided not to participate.
Victor Hănescu won the title, defeating Íñigo Cervantes Huegun 6–4, 7–5 in the final.

== Seeds ==
1. (Italy) Filippo Volandri (first round, retired because of a shoulder injury)
2. (Germany) Björn Phau (withdrew because of a neck injury)
3. (Poland) Jerzy Janowicz (quarterfinals)
4. (Spain) Albert Montañés (second round)
5. (Romania) Victor Hănescu (champion)
6. (Argentina) Federico Delbonis (second round)
7. (France) Guillaume Rufin (first round)
8. (Serbia) Dušan Lajović (first round, retired because of a side muscle injury)

== Draw ==
Key

- Q = Qualifier
- WC = Wild card
- LL = Lucky loser
- Alt = Alternate
- ITF = ITF entry
- PR = Protected ranking
- SR = Special ranking
- SE = Special exempt
- JE = Junior exempt
- JR = Junior Accelerator Programme entrant
- CO = College Accelerator Programme entrant
- NG = Next Gen Accelerator Program entrant
- w/o = Walkover
- r = Retired
- d = Defaulted

=== Finals ===
Semifinals
(France) Jonathan Dasnières de Veigy	3	4
5	(Romania) Victor Hănescu	6	6
(Spain) Íñigo Cervantes Huegun	7	6
(Ukraine) Ivan Sergeyev	5	3

Final
5	(Romania) Victor Hănescu	6	7
(Spain) Íñigo Cervantes Huegun	4	5

=== Top half ===
First round
1	(Italy) F Volandri	2^{r}
(Italy) A Giannessi	4
SE	(Germany) S Greul	6	6
(Spain) A Brugués Davi	2	1
(Argentina) F Argüello	2	0^{r}
(Czech Republic) J Mertl	6	2
(France) J Dasnières de Veigy	6	3
8	(Serbia) D Lajović	2	1^{r}
4	(Spain) A Montañés	7^{8}	6
(Italy) P Starace	6^{6}	1
(Spain) D Muñoz de la Nava	3	6	6
Q	(Poland) Piotr Gadomski	6	2	1
WC	(Poland) G Panfil	6	7^{7}
(Germany) P Torebko	2	6^{1}
WC	(Poland) M Gawron	4	3
5	(Romania) V Hănescu	6	6

Second round
(Italy) A Giannessi	2	6	3
SE	(Germany) S Greul	6	4	6
(Czech Republic) J Mertl	4	2
(France) J Dasnières de Veigy	6	6
4	(Spain) A Montañés	5	4
(Spain) D Muñoz de la Nava	7	6
WC	(Poland) G Panfil	6	4	4
5	(Romania) V Hănescu	2	6	6

Quarterfinals
SE	(Germany) S Greul	6	2	4
(France) J Dasnières de Veigy	3	6	6
(Spain) D Muñoz de la Nava	6	3	3
5	(Romania) V Hănescu	4	6	6

Semifinals
(France) J Dasnières de Veigy	3	4
5	(Romania) V Hănescu	6	6

=== Bottom half ===
First round
7	(France) G Rufin	4	4
(Spain) I Cervantes	6	6
(Italy) G Naso	4	6^{4}
(Kazakhstan) A Golubev	6	7^{7}
Q	(Ukraine) A Smirnov	1	7	7
WC	(Poland) M Przysiężny	6	5	5
(Belgium) Y Mertens	7^{8}	3	4
3	(Poland) J Janowicz	6^{6}	6	6
6	(Argentina) F Delbonis	6	6
(France) N Devilder	3	1
SE	(Germany) B Knittel	3	4
(Ukraine) I Sergeyev	6	6
WC	(Poland) Arkadiusz Kocyla	6	6
Q	(Russia) A Rumyantsev	2	3
Q	(Argentina) G Andreozzi	6	7^{7}
LL	(Netherlands) T Schoorel	2	6^{3}

Second round
(Spain) I Cervantes	6	6
(Kazakhstan) A Golubev	4	1
Q	(Ukraine) A Smirnov	3	1
3	(Poland) J Janowicz	6	6
6	(Argentina) F Delbonis	4	5
(Ukraine) I Sergeyev	6	7
WC	(Poland) A Kocyla	2	2
Q	(Argentina) G Andreozzi	6	6

Quarterfinals
(Spain) I Cervantes	6	6
3	(Poland) J Janowicz	4	2
(Ukraine) I Sergeyev	6	6
Q	(Argentina) G Andreozzi	3	4

Semifinals
(Spain) I Cervantes	7	6
(Ukraine) I Sergeyev	5	3
