= 2022 Pekao Szczecin Open – Singles =

Singles
- 2022 Pekao Szczecin Open

Final
- Champion: (France) Corentin Moutet
- Runner-up: (Austria) Dennis Novak
- Score: 6–2, 6–7^{(5–7)}, 6–4

Events
Singles	Doubles
- Pekao Szczecin Open

Zdeněk Kolář was the defending champion but chose not to defend his title.

Corentin Moutet won the title after defeating Dennis Novak 6–2, 6–7^{(5–7)}, 6–4 in the final.

== Seeds ==
1. (Argentina) Federico Coria (first round)
2. (Spain) Roberto Carballés Baena (quarterfinals)
3. (Chinese Taipei) Tseng Chun-hsin (second round)
4. (France) Corentin Moutet (champion)
5. (Spain) Carlos Taberner (second round)
6. (Argentina) Federico Delbonis (quarterfinals)
7. (Austria) Dennis Novak (final)
8. (Italy) Marco Cecchinato (second round)

== Draw ==
Key

- Q = Qualifier
- WC = Wild card
- LL = Lucky loser
- Alt = Alternate
- ITF = ITF entry
- PR = Protected ranking
- SR = Special ranking
- SE = Special exempt
- JE = Junior exempt
- JR = Junior Accelerator Programme entrant
- CO = College Accelerator Programme entrant
- NG = Next Gen Accelerator Program entrant
- w/o = Walkover
- r = Retired
- d = Defaulted

=== Finals ===
Semifinals
(Italy) Raúl Brancaccio	4	6^{9}
7	(Austria) Dennis Novak	6	7^{11}
4	(France) Corentin Moutet	6	6
Alexander Shevchenko	4	2

Final
7	(Austria) Dennis Novak	2	7^{7}	4
4	(France) Corentin Moutet	6	6^{5}	6

=== Top half ===
First round
1	(Argentina) F Coria	3	6^{5}
(Italy) R Brancaccio	6	7^{7}
WC	(Poland) M Kaśnikowski	6	3	2
(Italy) F Cobolli	3	6	6
(Italy) A Pellegrino	7^{7}	6
Q	(Germany) R Molleker	6^{3}	1
Q	(France) L Van Assche	6^{5}	2
6	(Argentina) F Delbonis	7^{7}	6
3	(Chinese Taipei) C-h Tseng	7^{7}	6
LL	(Germany) L Wessels	6^{4}	2
WC	(Poland) J Janowicz	3	4
Q	(United Kingdom) J Choinski	6	6
Q	(Italy) M Bellucci	6	6
Q	(Czech Republic) M Krumich	3	2
(Argentina) TA Tirante	6^{4}	3
7	(Austria) D Novak	7^{7}	6

Second round
(Italy) R Brancaccio	6	6
(Italy) F Cobolli	4	4
(Italy) A Pellegrino	6^{3}	4
6	(Argentina) F Delbonis	7^{7}	6
3	(Chinese Taipei) C-h Tseng	4	6	6^{8}
Q	(United Kingdom) J Choinski	6	4	7^{10}
Q	(Italy) M Bellucci	7	4	4
7	(Austria) D Novak	5	6	6

Quarterfinals
(Italy) R Brancaccio	6	3	6
6	(Argentina) F Delbonis	2	6	1
Q	(United Kingdom) J Choinski	1	3
7	(Austria) D Novak	6	6

Semifinals
(Italy) R Brancaccio	4	6^{9}
7	(Austria) D Novak	6	7^{11}

=== Bottom half ===
First round
5	(Spain) C Taberner	6^{4}	6	6
Q	(Ukraine) G Kravchenko	7^{7}	0	0
(Italy) A Vavassori	3	2
(Italy) M Arnaldi	6	6
(Kazakhstan) T Skatov	3	6	4
(Italy) G Mager	6	1	6
(Spain) N Sánchez Izquierdo	5	6	4
4	(France) C Moutet	7	0	6
8	(Italy) M Cecchinato	6	6
(Italy) GM Moroni	3	1
(France) M Guinard	2	3
A Shevchenko	6	6
(Argentina) F Díaz Acosta	7	5	3
WC	(Poland) D Michalski	5	7	6
(Serbia) M Zekić	5	1
2	(Spain) R Carballés Baena	7	6

Second round
5	(Spain) C Taberner	3	0
(Italy) M Arnaldi	6	6
(Italy) G Mager	2	0
4	(France) C Moutet	6	6
8	(Italy) M Cecchinato	2	2
A Shevchenko	6	6
WC	(Poland) D Michalski	1	2
2	(Spain) R Carballés Baena	6	6

Quarterfinals
(Italy) M Arnaldi	6^{5}	5
4	(France) C Moutet	7^{7}	7
A Shevchenko	6	7
2	(Spain) R Carballés Baena	2	5

Semifinals
4	(France) C Moutet	6	6
A Shevchenko	4	2
