= 2019 Pekao Szczecin Open – Doubles =

Doubles
- 2019 Pekao Szczecin Open

Final
- Champions: (Argentina) Guido Andreozzi (Argentina) Andrés Molteni
- Runners-up: (Netherlands) Matwé Middelkoop (Chile) Hans Podlipnik Castillo
- Score: 6–4, 6–3

Events
Singles	Doubles
- Pekao Szczecin Open

Karol Drzewiecki and Filip Polášek were the defending champions but only Drzewiecki chose to defend his title, partnering Maciej Smoła. Drzewiecki lost in the first round to Matwé Middelkoop and Hans Podlipnik Castillo.

Guido Andreozzi and Andrés Molteni won the title after defeating Middelkoop and Podlipnik Castillo 6–4, 6–3 in the final.

== Seeds ==
1. (Netherlands) Matwé Middelkoop / (Chile) Hans Podlipnik Castillo (final)
2. (Argentina) Guido Andreozzi / (Argentina) Andrés Molteni (champions)
3. (Canada) Adil Shamasdin / (Italy) Andrea Vavassori (withdrew)
4. (Italy) Simone Bolelli / (Italy) Andrea Pellegrino (quarterfinals)

== Draw ==
Key

- Q = Qualifier
- WC = Wild card
- LL = Lucky loser
- Alt = Alternate
- ITF = ITF entry
- PR = Protected ranking
- SR = Special ranking
- SE = Special exempt
- JE = Junior exempt
- JR = Junior Accelerator Programme entrant
- CO = College Accelerator Programme entrant
- NG = Next Gen Accelerator Program entrant
- w/o = Walkover
- r = Retired
- d = Defaulted

First round
1	(Netherlands) M Middelkoop (Chile) H Podlipnik Castillo	4	6	[12]
WC	(Poland) K Drzewiecki (Poland) Maciej Smoła	6	4	[10]
WC	(Poland) J Zieliński (Poland) K Żuk	7^{10}	6
(Russia) I Gakhov (Czech Republic) V Kopřiva	6^{8}	2
WC	(Poland) Daniel Kossek (Poland) M Kowalczyk	6	6
(Japan) T Daniel (Italy) L Giustino	2	1
(Germany) A Begemann (Romania) F Mergea	6	5	[10]
(Argentina) F Argüello (Spain) R Carballés Baena	4	7	[7]
(Czech Republic) R Jebavý (Czech Republic) A Pavlásek	2	3
4	(Italy) S Bolelli (Italy) A Pellegrino	6	6
(France) E Benchetrit (France) M Guinard	3	7^{7}	[10]
Alt	(Italy) A Bega (Italy) G Mager	6	6^{5}	[7]
(Argentina) F Bagnis (Italy) A Giannessi	1	3
2	(Argentina) G Andreozzi (Argentina) A Molteni	6	6

Quarterfinals
1	(Netherlands) M Middelkoop (Chile) H Podlipnik Castillo	6	7
WC	(Poland) J Zieliński (Poland) K Żuk	4	5
(Germany) J Lenz (Brazil) F Romboli	7	7
WC	(Poland) D Kossek (Poland) M Kowalczyk	5	5
(Germany) A Begemann (Romania) F Mergea	7	7^{7}
4	(Italy) S Bolelli (Italy) A Pellegrino	5	6^{5}
(France) E Benchetrit (France) M Guinard	6	2	[4]
2	(Argentina) G Andreozzi (Argentina) A Molteni	2	6	[10]

Semifinals
1	(Netherlands) M Middelkoop (Chile) H Podlipnik Castillo	6	6
(Germany) J Lenz (Brazil) F Romboli	4	0
(Germany) A Begemann (Romania) F Mergea	5	4
2	(Argentina) G Andreozzi (Argentina) A Molteni	7	6

Final
1	(Netherlands) M Middelkoop (Chile) H Podlipnik Castillo	4	3
2	(Argentina) G Andreozzi (Argentina) A Molteni	6	6
