= 2018 Pekao Szczecin Open – Doubles =

Doubles
- 2018 Pekao Szczecin Open

Final
- Champions: (Poland) Karol Drzewiecki (Slovakia) Filip Polášek
- Runners-up: (Argentina) Guido Andreozzi (Argentina) Guillermo Durán
- Score: 6–3, 6–4

Events
Singles	Doubles
- Pekao Szczecin Open

Wesley Koolhof and Artem Sitak were the defending champions but chose not to defend their title.

Karol Drzewiecki and Filip Polášek won the title after defeating Guido Andreozzi and Guillermo Durán 6–3, 6–4 in the final.

== Seeds ==
1. (Argentina) Andrés Molteni / (Slovakia) Igor Zelenay (quarterfinals)
2. (Monaco) Romain Arneodo / (France) Jonathan Eysseric (semifinals)
3. (Belgium) Sander Gillé / (Belgium) Joran Vliegen (quarterfinals)
4. (Italy) Simone Bolelli / (Italy) Daniele Bracciali (first round)

== Draw ==
Key

- Q = Qualifier
- WC = Wild card
- LL = Lucky loser
- Alt = Alternate
- ITF = ITF entry
- PR = Protected ranking
- SR = Special ranking
- SE = Special exempt
- JE = Junior exempt
- JR = Junior Accelerator Programme entrant
- CO = College Accelerator Programme entrant
- NG = Next Gen Accelerator Program entrant
- w/o = Walkover
- r = Retired
- d = Defaulted

First round
1	(Argentina) A Molteni (Slovakia) I Zelenay	7	6
(Poland) T Bednarek (Belarus) A Bury	5	2
(Germany) A Begemann (Germany) D Brown	4	6	[5]
(Argentina) G Andreozzi (Argentina) G Durán	6	2	[10]
3	(Belgium) S Gillé (Belgium) J Vliegen	6	6
WC	(Poland) Yann Wójcik (Poland) K Żuk	1	3
(Brazil) F Neis (Spain) D Vega Hernández	7	2	[10]
(Brazil) R Dutra Silva (Italy) P Lorenzi	5	6	[6]
WC	(Poland) G Panfil (Ukraine) V Uzhylovskyi	6	6
Q	(Spain) S Gutiérrez Ferrol (Spain) M Vilella Martínez	3	4
WC	(Poland) K Drzewiecki (Slovakia) F Polášek	2	6	[10]
4	(Italy) S Bolelli (Italy) D Bracciali	6	2	[4]
(Uruguay) A Behar (Brazil) F Romboli	6	3	[7]
(Russia) I Gakhov (Russia) A Pavlioutchenkov	4	6	[10]
(Italy) A Arnaboldi (Italy) A Pellegrino	1	5
2	(Monaco) R Arneodo (France) J Eysseric	6	7

Quarterfinals
1	(Argentina) A Molteni (Slovakia) I Zelenay	5	6	[3]
(Argentina) G Andreozzi (Argentina) G Durán	7	1	[10]
3	(Belgium) S Gillé (Belgium) J Vliegen	5	6^{6}
(Brazil) F Neis (Spain) D Vega Hernández	7	7^{8}
WC	(Poland) G Panfil (Ukraine) V Uzhylovskyi	3	1
WC	(Poland) K Drzewiecki (Slovakia) F Polášek	6	6
(Russia) I Gakhov (Russia) A Pavlioutchenkov	6^{5}	5
2	(Monaco) R Arneodo (France) J Eysseric	7^{7}	7

Semifinals
(Argentina) G Andreozzi (Argentina) G Durán	7^{7}	6
(Brazil) F Neis (Spain) D Vega Hernández	6^{3}	4
WC	(Poland) K Drzewiecki (Slovakia) F Polášek	6	3	[10]
2	(Monaco) R Arneodo (France) J Eysseric	4	6	[6]

Final
(Argentina) G Andreozzi (Argentina) G Durán	3	4
WC	(Poland) K Drzewiecki (Slovakia) F Polášek	6	6
