= 2014 Pekao Szczecin Open – Singles =

Singles
- 2014 Pekao Szczecin Open

Final
- Champion: (Germany) Dustin Brown
- Runner-up: (Germany) Jan-Lennard Struff
- Score: 6–4, 6–3

Events
Singles	Doubles
- Pekao Szczecin Open

Aleksandr Nedovyesov was the defending champion, but lost in the quarterfinals to Błażej Koniusz.

Dustin Brown won the title, defeating Jan-Lennard Struff 6–4, 6–3 in the final.

== Seeds ==
1. (Germany) Jan-Lennard Struff (final)
2. (Germany) Dustin Brown (champion)
3. (Kazakhstan) Aleksandr Nedovyesov (quarterfinals)
4. (Spain) Albert Montañés (second round)
5. (Germany) Andreas Beck (first round)
6. (Spain) Pere Riba (first round)
7. (Argentina) Facundo Argüello (semifinals)
8. (Hungary) Márton Fucsovics (first round)

== Draw ==
Key

- Q = Qualifier
- WC = Wild card
- LL = Lucky loser
- Alt = Alternate
- ITF = ITF entry
- PR = Protected ranking
- SR = Special ranking
- SE = Special exempt
- JE = Junior exempt
- JR = Junior Accelerator Programme entrant
- CO = College Accelerator Programme entrant
- NG = Next Gen Accelerator Program entrant
- w/o = Walkover
- r = Retired
- d = Defaulted

=== Finals ===
Semifinals
1	(Germany) Jan-Lennard Struff	1	6	6
7	(Argentina) Facundo Argüello	6	0	2
(France) Lucas Pouille	4	4
2	(Germany) Dustin Brown	6	6

Final
1	(Germany) Jan-Lennard Struff	4	3
2	(Germany) Dustin Brown	6	6

=== Top half ===
First round
1	(Germany) J-L Struff	5
(Italy) R Marcora	0^{r}
Q	(Poland) M Kowalczyk	4	3
(Czech Republic) A Pavlásek	6	6
SE	(France) G Rufin	2^{r}
(Italy) P Starace	3
(Czech Republic) J Mertl	7^{8}	7
8	(Hungary) M Fucsovics	6^{6}	5
3	(Kazakhstan) A Nedovyesov	6	7^{11}
Q	(Poland) B Koniusz	1	6^{9}
WC	(Chile) C Garin	6	7^{8}
(Germany) P Torebko	4	6^{6}
Q	(Russia) P Davydenko	2	6	6
(Georgia (country)) N Basilashvili	6	4	4
(Belarus) U Ignatik	4	7^{7}	4
7	(Argentina) F Argüello	6	6^{4}	6

Second round
1	(Germany) J-L Struff	4	6	6
(Czech Republic) A Pavlásek	6	3	3
(Italy) P Starace	2	6	7^{10}
(Czech Republic) J Mertl	6	4	6^{8}
3	(Kazakhstan) A Nedovyesov	6	6
WC	(Chile) C Garin	3	4
Q	(Russia) P Davydenko	4	2
7	(Argentina) F Argüello	6	6

Quarterfinals
1	(Germany) J-L Struff	6	4
(Italy) P Starace	2	1^{r}
3	(Kazakhstan) A Nedovyesov	6^{5}	2
7	(Argentina) F Argüello	7^{7}	6

Semifinals
1	(Germany) J-L Struff	1	6	6
7	(Argentina) F Argüello	6	0	2

=== Bottom half ===
First round
6	(Spain) P Riba	6	5	2
(Slovakia) J Kovalík	2	7	6
LL	(Finland) M Kontinen	6	6
(Slovakia) I Klec	3	4
(France) L Pouille	6	1
(Chile) H Podlipnik Castillo	3	0^{r}
Q	(Poland) M Gawron	1	3
4	(Spain) A Montañés	6	6
5	(Germany) A Beck	3	6	0
(France) A Michon	6	3	6
WC	(Poland) K Majchrzak	6	2	6
(Croatia) A Veić	2	6	4
WC	(Poland) Rafal Teurer	4	6	3
(France) M Bourgue	6	4	6
WC	(Poland) G Panfil	5	2
2	(Germany) D Brown	7	6

Second round
(Slovakia) J Kovalík	4	7^{7}	3
LL	(Finland) M Kontinen	6	6^{2}	6
(France) L Pouille	6	1	7^{7}
4	(Spain) A Montañés	4	6	6^{5}
(France) A Michon	7^{7}	3	6^{2}
WC	(Poland) K Majchrzak	6^{5}	6	7^{7}
(France) M Bourgue	7^{7}	4	3
2	(Germany) D Brown	6^{5}	6	6

Quarterfinals
LL	(Finland) M Kontinen	0	6	3
(France) L Pouille	6	3	6
WC	(Poland) K Majchrzak	4	2
2	(Germany) D Brown	6	6

Semifinals
(France) L Pouille	4	4
2	(Germany) D Brown	6	6
