= 2014 Pekao Szczecin Open – Doubles =

Doubles
- 2014 Pekao Szczecin Open

Final
- Champions: (Germany) Dustin Brown (Germany) Jan-Lennard Struff
- Runners-up: (Poland) Tomasz Bednarek (Slovakia) Igor Zelenay
- Score: 6–2, 6–4

Events
Singles	Doubles
- Pekao Szczecin Open

Ken Skupski and Neal Skupski were the defending champions, but lost in the semifinals to Tomasz Bednarek and Igor Zelenay.

Dustin Brown and Jan-Lennard Struff won the title by defeating Tomasz Bednarek and Igor Zelenay 6–2, 6–4 in the final.

== Seeds ==
1. (Germany) Andre Begemann / (Austria) Oliver Marach (quarterfinals)
2. (Czech Republic) František Čermák / (Czech Republic) Lukáš Dlouhý (quarterfinals)
3. (Australia) Rameez Junaid / (New Zealand) Michael Venus (semifinals)
4. (United Kingdom) Ken Skupski / (United Kingdom) Neal Skupski (semifinals)

== Draw ==
Key

- Q = Qualifier
- WC = Wild card
- LL = Lucky loser
- Alt = Alternate
- ITF = ITF entry
- PR = Protected ranking
- SR = Special ranking
- SE = Special exempt
- JE = Junior exempt
- JR = Junior Accelerator Programme entrant
- CO = College Accelerator Programme entrant
- NG = Next Gen Accelerator Program entrant
- w/o = Walkover
- r = Retired
- d = Defaulted

=== Draw ===
First round
1	(Germany) A Begemann (Austria) O Marach	7	6
(Germany) G Kretschmer (United States) N Monroe	5	4
(Argentina) F Argüello (Italy) P Starace	6	3	[10]
(Germany) D Brown (Germany) J-L Struff	4	6	[12]
3	(Australia) R Junaid (New Zealand) M Venus	6^{5}	6	[10]
(Poland) M Kowalczyk (New Zealand) A Sitak	7^{7}	2	[4]
WC	(Poland) K Majchrzak (Poland) J Zieliński	6	7
(Netherlands) W Koolhof (Italy) A Motti	4	5
(Hungary) M Fucsovics (France) A Michon	7^{7}	6
WC	(Poland) Piotr Gadomski (Poland) Maciej Smoła	6^{5}	4
WC	(Poland) A Kapaś (Poland) B Koniusz	6^{3}	2
4	(United Kingdom) K Skupski (United Kingdom) N Skupski	7^{7}	6
(Poland) T Bednarek (Slovakia) I Zelenay	3	6	[13]
(Germany) A Beck (Kazakhstan) A Nedovyesov	6	4	[11]
(Czech Republic) J Mertl (Spain) P Riba	2	0
2	(Czech Republic) F Čermák (Czech Republic) L L Dlouhý	6	6

Quarterfinals
1	(Germany) A Begemann (Austria) O Marach	3	6	[5]
(Germany) D Brown (Germany) J-L Struff	6	1	[10]
3	(Australia) R Junaid (New Zealand) M Venus	4	7^{7}	[10]
WC	(Poland) K Majchrzak (Poland) J Zieliński	6	6^{5}	[7]
(Hungary) M Fucsovics (France) A Michon	4	7^{7}	[10]
4	(United Kingdom) K Skupski (United Kingdom) N Skupski	6	6^{3}	[12]
(Poland) T Bednarek (Slovakia) I Zelenay	7^{9}	6
2	(Czech Republic) F Čermák (Czech Republic) L Dlouhý	6^{7}	2

Semifinals
(Germany) D Brown (Germany) J-L Struff	7^{7}	4	[10]
3	(Australia) R Junaid (New Zealand) M Venus	6^{5}	6	[5]
4	(United Kingdom) K Skupski (United Kingdom) N Skupski	6^{4}	6^{5}
(Poland) T Bednarek (Slovakia) I Zelenay	7^{7}	7^{7}

Final
(Germany) D Brown (Germany) J-L Struff	6	6
(Poland) T Bednarek (Slovakia) I Zelenay	2	4
