= 2012 Pekao Szczecin Open – Doubles =

Doubles
- 2012 Pekao Szczecin Open

Final
- Champions: (Germany) Andre Begemann (Germany) Martin Emmrich
- Runners-up: (Poland) Tomasz Bednarek (Poland) Mateusz Kowalczyk
- Score: 3–6, 6–1, [10–3]

Events
Singles	Doubles
- Pekao Szczecin Open

Marcin Gawron and Andriej Kapaś are the defending champions, but lost in the first round this year.
Andre Begemann and Martin Emmrich won the title, defeating Tomasz Bednarek and Mateusz Kowalczyk 3–6, 6–1, [10–3] in the final.

== Seeds ==
1. (Germany) Andre Begemann / (Germany) Martin Emmrich (champions)
2. (Poland) Tomasz Bednarek / (Poland) Mateusz Kowalczyk (final)
3. (Australia) Rameez Junaid / (Canada) Adil Shamasdin (semifinals)
4. (Croatia) Marin Draganja / (Croatia) Lovro Zovko (semifinals)

== Draw ==
Key

- Q = Qualifier
- WC = Wild card
- LL = Lucky loser
- Alt = Alternate
- ITF = ITF entry
- PR = Protected ranking
- SR = Special ranking
- SE = Special exempt
- JE = Junior exempt
- JR = Junior Accelerator Programme entrant
- CO = College Accelerator Programme entrant
- NG = Next Gen Accelerator Program entrant
- w/o = Walkover
- r = Retired
- d = Defaulted

=== Draw ===
First round
1	(Germany) A Begemann (Germany) M Emmrich
(Spain) A Brugués-Davi (Serbia) D Lajović	w/o
(Italy) A Giannessi (Spain) D Muñoz de la Nava	6^{5}	1
WC	(Poland) Piotr Gadomski (Poland) Arkadiusz Kocyła	7^{7}	6
3	(Australia) R Junaid (Canada) A Shamasdin	6	7^{7}
(Poland) M Gawron (Poland) A Kapaś	4	6^{1}
(Belgium) Y Mertens (Ukraine) I Sergeyev	w/o
(France) J Dasnières de Veigy (France) N Devilder
(Poland) G Panfil (Poland) M Przysiężny	2	6	[12]
(Italy) S Ianni (Italy) G Naso	6	3	[10]
(Argentina) F Delbonis (Italy) P Starace	6^{4}	5
4	(Croatia) M Draganja (Croatia) L Zovko	7^{7}	7
(Argentina) G Andreozzi (France) G Rufin	4	6^{4}
(Spain) I Cervantes Huegun (Italy) A Motti	6	7^{7}
(Czech Republic) J Mertl (Czech Republic) D Škoch	6	1	[8]
2	(Poland) T Bednarek (Poland) M Kowalczyk	4	6	[10]

Quarterfinals
1	(Germany) A Begemann (Germany) M Emmrich	6	6
WC	(Poland) P Gadomski (Poland) A Kocyła	3	4
3	(Australia) R Junaid (Canada) A Shamasdin	7^{8}	6
(Belgium) Y Mertens (Ukraine) I Sergeyev	6^{6}	4
(Poland) G Panfil (Poland) M Przysiężny	5	2
4	(Croatia) M Draganja (Croatia) L Zovko	7	6
(Spain) I Cervantes Huegun (Italy) A Motti	6^{4}	6^{5}
2	(Poland) T Bednarek (Poland) M Kowalczyk	7^{7}	7^{7}

Semifinals
1	(Germany) A Begemann (Germany) M Emmrich	2	6	[10]
3	(Australia) R Junaid (Canada) A Shamasdin	6	2	[8]
4	(Croatia) M Draganja (Croatia) L Zovko	4	5
2	(Poland) T Bednarek (Poland) M Kowalczyk	6	7

Final
1	(Germany) A Begemann (Germany) M Emmrich	3	6	[10]
2	(Poland) T Bednarek (Poland) M Kowalczyk	6	1	[3]
