= 2022 Pekao Szczecin Open – Doubles =

Doubles
- 2022 Pekao Szczecin Open

Final
- Champions: (Jamaica) Dustin Brown (Italy) Andrea Vavassori
- Runners-up: (Czech Republic) Roman Jebavý (Czech Republic) Adam Pavlásek
- Score: 6–4, 5–7, [10–8]

Events
Singles	Doubles
- Pekao Szczecin Open

Santiago González and Andrés Molteni were the defending champions but chose not to defend their title.

Dustin Brown and Andrea Vavassori won the title after defeating Roman Jebavý and Adam Pavlásek 6–4, 5–7, [10–8] in the final.

== Seeds ==
1. (Venezuela) Luis David Martínez / (Colombia) Cristian Rodríguez (semifinals)
2. (Serbia) Ivan Sabanov / (Serbia) Matej Sabanov (semifinals)
3. (Czech Republic) Roman Jebavý / (Czech Republic) Adam Pavlásek (final)
4. (Jamaica) Dustin Brown / (Italy) Andrea Vavassori (champions)

== Draw ==
Key

- Q = Qualifier
- WC = Wild card
- LL = Lucky loser
- Alt = Alternate
- ITF = ITF entry
- PR = Protected ranking
- SR = Special ranking
- SE = Special exempt
- JE = Junior exempt
- JR = Junior Accelerator Programme entrant
- CO = College Accelerator Programme entrant
- NG = Next Gen Accelerator Program entrant
- w/o = Walkover
- r = Retired
- d = Defaulted

First round
1	(Venezuela) LD Martínez (Colombia) C Rodríguez	6	5	[10]
(Ukraine) D Molchanov (Croatia) F Škugor	3	7	[6]
(Spain) R Carballés Baena (Italy) A Pellegrino
WC	(Poland) M Kaśnikowski (Poland) Yann Wójcik	w/o
4	(Jamaica) D Brown (Italy) A Vavassori	6	4	[10]
I Gakhov; A Shevchenko	4	6	[3]
(Poland) K Drzewiecki (Poland) S Walków	6	7^{7}
(Ukraine) O Krutykh (Poland) D Michalski	0	6^{5}
(Italy) F Cobolli (Italy) GM Moroni	5	6	[7]
(France) M Guinard (Switzerland) J Nikles	7	3	[10]
WC	(Poland) P Matuszewski (Czech Republic) A Paulson	3	4
3	(Czech Republic) R Jebavý (Czech Republic) A Pavlásek	6	6
(Italy) M Bortolotti (Spain) S Martos Gornés	6^{4}	6	[7]
(Spain) C Taberner (Argentina) TA Tirante	7^{7}	3	[10]
(United States) E King (Switzerland) L Margaroli	2	3
2	(Serbia) I Sabanov (Serbia) M Sabanov'	6	6

Quarterfinals
1	(Venezuela) LD Martínez (Colombia) C Rodríguez	6	6
WC	(Poland) M Kaśnikowski (Poland) Y Wójcik	4	1
4	(Jamaica) D Brown (Italy) A Vavassori	7	7^{7}
(Poland) K Drzewiecki (Poland) S Walków	5	6^{5}
(France) M Guinard (Switzerland) J Nikles	3	1
3	(Czech Republic) R Jebavý (Czech Republic) A Pavlásek	6	6
(Spain) C Taberner (Argentina) TA Tirante	3	2
2	(Serbia) I Sabanov (Serbia) M Sabanov	6	6

Semifinals
1	(Venezuela) LD Martínez (Colombia) C Rodríguez	4	6	[6]
4	(Jamaica) D Brown (Italy) A Vavassori	6	1	[10]
3	(Czech Republic) R Jebavý (Czech Republic) A Pavlásek	6	3	[10]
2	(Serbia) I Sabanov (Serbia) M Sabanov	2	6	[7]

Final
4	(Jamaica) D Brown (Italy) A Vavassori	6	5	[10]
3	(Czech Republic) R Jebavý (Czech Republic) A Pavlásek	4	7	[8]
