= 2019 Pekao Szczecin Open – Singles =

Singles
- 2019 Pekao Szczecin Open

Final
- Champion: (Slovakia) Jozef Kovalík
- Runner-up: (Argentina) Guido Andreozzi
- Score: 6–7^{(5–7)}, 6–2, 6–4

Events
| Singles | Doubles |
- Pekao Szczecin Open

Guido Andreozzi was the defending champion but lost to Jozef Kovalík in the final.

Kovalík won the title after defeating Andreozzi 6–7^{(5–7)}, 6–2, 6–4 in the final.

== Seeds ==
All seeds receive a bye into the second round.

1. (Spain) Albert Ramos Viñolas (semifinals)
2. (Italy) Marco Cecchinato (semifinals)
3. (Germany) Philipp Kohlschreiber (second round)
4. (Spain) Roberto Carballés Baena (quarterfinals)
5. (Argentina) Guido Andreozzi (final)
6. (Italy) Lorenzo Giustino (second round)
7. (Japan) Taro Daniel (quarterfinals)
8. (Italy) Gianluca Mager (third round)
9. (Italy) Alessandro Giannessi (second round)
10. (Germany) Rudolf Molleker (second round)
11. (Argentina) Facundo Bagnis (second round)
12. (Argentina) Facundo Argüello (third round)
13. (Russia) Alexey Vatutin (third round)
14. (France) Constant Lestienne (quarterfinals)
15. (France) Elliot Benchetrit (third round)
16. (Brazil) Thomaz Bellucci (third round)

== Draw ==
Key

- Q = Qualifier
- WC = Wild card
- LL = Lucky loser
- Alt = Alternate
- ITF = ITF entry
- PR = Protected ranking
- SR = Special ranking
- SE = Special exempt
- JE = Junior exempt
- JR = Junior Accelerator Programme entrant
- CO = College Accelerator Programme entrant
- NG = Next Gen Accelerator Program entrant
- w/o = Walkover
- r = Retired
- d = Defaulted

=== Finals ===
Quarterfinals
1/WC | (Spain) Albert Ramos Viñolas | 7^{7} | 6
(Germany) Jeremy Jahn | 6^{4} | 2
4 | (Spain) Roberto Carballés Baena | 4 | 5
5 | (Argentina) Guido Andreozzi | 6 | 7
(Slovakia) Jozef Kovalík | 6 | 6
14 | (France) Constant Lestienne | 4 | 4
7 | (Japan) Taro Daniel | 7^{11} | 2 | 1
2 | (Italy) Marco Cecchinato | 6^{9} | 6 | 6

Semifinals
1/WC | (Spain) Albert Ramos Viñolas | 3 | 6 | 1
5 | (Argentina) Guido Andreozzi | 6 | 2 | 6
(Slovakia) Jozef Kovalík | 7^{9} | 6
2 | (Italy) Marco Cecchinato | 6^{7} | 1

Final
5 | (Argentina) Guido Andreozzi | 7^{7} | 2 | 4
(Slovakia) Jozef Kovalík | 6^{5} | 6 | 6

=== Top half ===
==== Section 1 ====
First round
(Germany) J Härteis | 2 | 6 | 6
(France) Matthieu Perchicot | 6 | 4 | 2
(Russia) Ronald Slobodchikov | 6 | 6
(Sweden) C Lindell | 4 | 2
(Czech Republic) V Kopřiva | 5 | 4
(Germany) Jeremy Jahn | 7 | 6
Q | (Poland) K Żuk | 7^{10} | 6
LL | (Poland) Maciej Smoła | 6^{8} | 2

Second round
1/WC | (Spain) A Ramos Viñolas | 6 | 6
(Germany) J Härteis | 2 | 4
(Russia) R Slobodchikov | 4 | 3
16 | (Brazil) T Bellucci | 6 | 6
10 | (Germany) R Molleker | 4 | 3
(Germany) J Jahn | 6 | 6
Q | (Poland) K Żuk | 6^{6} | 4
8 | (Italy) G Mager | 7^{8} | 6

Third round
1/WC | (Spain) A Ramos Viñolas | 7 | 6
16 | (Brazil) T Bellucci | 5 | 2
(Germany) J Jahn | 6 | 2 | 6
8 | (Italy) G Mager | 1 | 6 | 4

Quarterfinals
1/WC | (Spain) A Ramos Viñolas | 7^{7} | 6
(Germany) J Jahn | 6^{4} | 2

==== Section 2 ====
First round
Alt | (Brazil) Oscar José Gutierrez | 6^{4} | 3
(Czech Republic) J Šátral | 7^{7} | 6
(United Kingdom) J Choinski | 4 | 1
(Italy) A Bega | 6 | 6
(Russia) E Tiurnev | 4 | 2
WC | (Poland) D Michalski | 6 | 6
(Russia) I Gakhov | 6 | 7^{7}
WC | (Poland) K Drzewiecki | 2 | 6^{5}

Second round
4 | (Spain) R Carballés Baena | 6 | 6
(Czech Republic) J Šátral | 4 | 3
(Italy) A Bega | 2 | 3
15 | (France) E Benchetrit | 6 | 6
11 | (Argentina) F Bagnis | 7 | 4 | 6^{1}
WC | (Poland) D Michalski | 5 | 6 | 7^{7}
(Russia) I Gakhov | 2 | 1
5 | (Argentina) G Andreozzi | 6 | 6

Third round
4 | (Spain) R Carballés Baena | 6 | 6
15 | (France) E Benchetrit | 4 | 3
WC | (Poland) D Michalski | 3 | 1
5 | (Argentina) G Andreozzi | 6 | 6

Quarterfinals
4 | (Spain) R Carballés Baena | 4 | 5
5 | (Argentina) G Andreozzi | 6 | 7

=== Bottom half ===
==== Section 3 ====
First round
(Slovakia) J Kovalík | 6 | 6
(Czech Republic) A Pavlásek | 3 | 2
WC | (Poland) Paweł Ciaś | 7 | 3 | 6
(Germany) P Torebko | 5 | 6 | 4
(Germany) D Masur | 6 | 7^{7}
Q | (Poland) Piotr Galus | 3 | 6^{4}
(Italy) R Bonadio | 6 | 6
(Italy) A Pellegrino | 2 | 3

Second round
6 | (Italy) L Giustino | 7^{7} | 6^{6} | 1
(Slovakia) J Kovalík | 6^{5} | 7^{8} | 6
WC | (Poland) P Ciaś | 6 | 6
9 | (Italy) A Giannessi | 2 | 0
14 | (France) C Lestienne | 6 | 6
(Germany) D Masur | 2 | 3
(Italy) R Bonadio | 0 | 6 | 6
3 | (Germany) P Kohlschreiber | 6 | 4 | 3

Third round
(Slovakia) J Kovalík | 6 | 6
WC | (Poland) P Ciaś | 4 | 0
14 | (France) C Lestienne | 5
(Italy) R Bonadio | 2^{r}

Quarterfinals
(Slovakia) J Kovalík | 6 | 6
14 | (France) C Lestienne | 4 | 4

==== Section 4 ====
First round
(Italy) E Dalla Valle | 1 | 6 | 3
(Czech Republic) Pavel Nejedlý | 6 | 3 | 6
WC | (Poland) Filip Kolasiński | 6 | 7
(Germany) L Wessels | 3 | 5
(Germany) J Lenz | 6 | 6
(Spain) N Sánchez Izquierdo | 2 | 4
(Peru) JP Varillas | 2 | 6^{4}
(France) M Guinard | 6 | 7^{7}

Second round
7 | (Japan) T Daniel | 6 | 6
(Czech Republic) P Nejedlý | 2 | 2
WC | (Poland) F Kolasiński | 4 | 6^{6}
12 | (Argentina) F Argüello | 6 | 7^{8}
13 | (Russia) A Vatutin | 6 | 6
(Germany) J Lenz | 3 | 1
(France) M Guinard | 4 | 4
2 | (Italy) M Cecchinato | 6 | 6

Third round
7 | (Japan) T Daniel | 6 | 6
12 | (Argentina) F Argüello | 2 | 4
13 | (Russia) A Vatutin | 3 | 3
2 | (Italy) M Cecchinato | 6 | 6

Quarterfinals
7 | (Japan) T Daniel | 7^{11} | 2 | 1
2 | (Italy) M Cecchinato | 6^{9} | 6 | 6
