= 2009 Pekao Szczecin Open – Doubles =

Doubles
- 2009 Pekao Szczecin Open

Final
- Champions: (Poland) Tomasz Bednarek (Poland) Mateusz Kowalczyk
- Runners-up: (Ukraine) Oleksandr Dolgopolov Jr. (Ukraine) Artem Smirnov
- Score: 6–3, 6–4

Events
| Singles | Doubles |
- Pekao Szczecin Open

David Marrero and Dawid Olejniczak were the defending champions, but they didn't start this year.
Polish pair Tomasz Bednarek and Mateusz Kowalczyk won this tournament, by defeating Oleksandr Dolgopolov Jr. and Artem Smirnov 6–3, 6–4 in the final.

== Seeds ==
1. (Argentina) Lucas Arnold Ker / (Netherlands Antilles) Jean-Julien Rojer (quarterfinals)
2. (Czech Republic) Leoš Friedl / (Netherlands) Rogier Wassen (semifinals)
3. (United Kingdom) James Auckland / (United Kingdom) Jamie Murray (semifinals)
4. (United States) James Cerretani / (Czech Republic) Lukáš Rosol (quarterfinals)

== Draw ==
Key

- Q = Qualifier
- WC = Wild card
- LL = Lucky loser
- Alt = Alternate
- ITF = ITF entry
- PR = Protected ranking
- SR = Special ranking
- SE = Special exempt
- JE = Junior exempt
- JR = Junior Accelerator Programme entrant
- CO = College Accelerator Programme entrant
- NG = Next Gen Accelerator Program entrant
- w/o = Walkover
- r = Retired
- d = Defaulted

=== Draw ===
First round
1 | (Argentina) L Arnold Ker (Netherlands Antilles) J-J Rojer | 6 | 6
(Italy) M Crugnola (Australia) J Sirianni | 2 | 3
(Portugal) F Gil (Brazil) J Silva | 3 | 2
(Ukraine) O Dolgopolov Jr. (Ukraine) A Smirnov | 6 | 6
3 | (United Kingdom) J Auckland (United Kingdom) J Marray | 6 | 6
WC | (Poland) M Gawron (Poland) G Panfil | 3 | 1
(Spain) A Martín (Algeria) L Ouahab | w/o
(Australia) P Luczak (Kazakhstan) Y Schukin
(Germany) M Kohlmann (Germany) F Mayer | 1 | 3
(Poland) T Bednarek (Poland) M Kowalczyk | 6 | 6
WC | (Poland) A Chadaj (Poland) B Fedyna | 3 | 6^{3}
4 | (United States) J Cerretani (Czech Republic) L Rosol | 6 | 7
(Spain) Ó Hernández (Spain) A Montañés | 6 | 6
WC | (Poland) R Gozdur (Poland) M Szmigiel | 1 | 4
(United States) M Russell (Russia) D Sitak | 1 | 1
2 | (Czech Republic) L Friedl (Netherlands) R Wassen | 6 | 6

Quarterfinals
1 | (Argentina) L Arnold Ker (Netherlands Antilles) J-J Rojer | 3 | 4
(Ukraine) O Dolgopolov Jr. (Ukraine) A Smirnov | 6 | 6
3 | (United Kingdom) J Auckland (United Kingdom) J Marray | 6 | 7
(Australia) P Luczak (Kazakhstan) Y Schukin | 4 | 6^{0}
(Poland) T Bednarek (Poland) M Kowalczyk | 6 | 6
4 | (United States) J Cerretani (Czech Republic) L Rosol | 2 | 1
(Spain) Ó Hernández (Spain) A Montañés | 4 | 6 | [7]
2 | (Czech Republic) L Friedl (Netherlands) R Wassen | 6 | 4 | [10]

Semifinals
(Ukraine) O Dolgopolov Jr. (Ukraine) A Smirnov | 7 | 6
3 | (United Kingdom) J Auckland (United Kingdom) J Marray | 6^{3} | 1
(Poland) T Bednarek (Poland) M Kowalczyk | 6 | 6
2 | (Czech Republic) L Friedl (Netherlands) R Wassen | 2 | 3

Finals
(Ukraine) O Dolgopolov Jr. (Ukraine) A Smirnov | 3 | 4
(Poland) T Bednarek (Poland) M Kowalczyk | 6 | 6
