= 2009 Pekao Szczecin Open – Singles =

Singles
- 2009 Pekao Szczecin Open

Final
- Champion: (Russia) Evgeny Korolev
- Runner-up: (France) Florent Serra
- Score: 6–4, 6–3

Events
Singles	Doubles
- Pekao Szczecin Open

Florent Serra was the defending champion. He reached the final, but lost to Evgeny Korolev 4–6, 3–6.

== Seeds ==
1. (Spain) Albert Montañés (semifinals)
2. (France) Florent Serra (final)
3. (Australia) Peter Luczak (first round)
4. (Russia) Evgeny Korolev (champion)
5. (Spain) Óscar Hernández (semifinals)
6. (Spain) Alberto Martín (second round)
7. (Portugal) Frederico Gil (second round)
8. (United States) Michael Russell (first round)

== Draw ==
Key

- Q = Qualifier
- WC = Wild card
- LL = Lucky loser
- Alt = Alternate
- ITF = ITF entry
- PR = Protected ranking
- SR = Special ranking
- SE = Special exempt
- JE = Junior exempt
- JR = Junior Accelerator Programme entrant
- CO = College Accelerator Programme entrant
- NG = Next Gen Accelerator Program entrant
- w/o = Walkover
- r = Retired
- d = Defaulted

=== Final four ===
Semifinals
1/WC	(Spain) Albert Montañés	6	3	2
4	(Russia) Evgeny Korolev	4	6	6
5	(Spain) Óscar Hernández	6^{1}	1
2	(France) Florent Serra	7	6

Final
4	(Russia) Evgeny Korolev	6	6
2	(France) Florent Serra	4	3

=== Top half ===
First round
1/WC	(Spain) A Montañés	6	6
(Czech Republic) L Rosol	0	2
(Algeria) L Ouahab	6	7
Q	(Russia) D Sitak	3	6^{3}
(Brazil) J Silva	4	4
(Germany) D Brands	6	6
WC	(Poland) R Gozdur	2	5
7	(Portugal) F Gil	6	7
4	(Russia) E Korolev	6	6
Q	(Poland) M Kowalczyk	4	1
(France) G Rufin	4	7	6
WC	(Poland) G Panfil	6	5	3
(Kazakhstan) Y Schukin	6	6
(Italy) M Crugnola	2	4
(Ukraine) O Dolgopolov Jr.	4	6	2
6	(Spain) A Martín	6	3	6

Second round
1/WC	(Spain) A Montañés	7	3	6
(Algeria) L Ouahab	5	6	1
(Germany) D Brands	7	7
7	(Portugal) F Gil	5	5
4	(Russia) E Korolev	7	6
(France) G Rufin	5	2
(Kazakhstan) Y Schukin	7	6
6	(Spain) A Martín	6^{6}	4

Quarterfinals
1/WC	(Spain) A Montañés	6	4	6
(Germany) D Brands	4	6	3
4	(Russia) E Korolev	6	6
(Kazakhstan) Y Schukin	3	3

Semifinals
1/WC	(Spain) A Montañés	6	3	2
4	(Russia) E Korolev	4	6	6

=== Bottom half ===
First round
5	(Spain) Ó Hernández	6	6
(Australia) J Sirianni	4	1
Q	(Czech Republic) L Chramosta	6	4
(South Korea) K-t Im	3	3	r
SE	(Spain) A Ramos Viñolas	6	6
(France) O Patience	4	4
(Germany) F Mayer	6	7
3	(Australia) P Luczak	2	6^{6}
8	(United States) M Russell	4	4
(Spain) S Ventura	6	6
Q	(France) A Michon	2	2
(Spain) R Ramírez Hidalgo	6	6
(Czech Republic) J Vaněk	4	6	6
WC	(Poland) M Gawron	6	2	4
(Poland) Ł Kubot	1	4
2	(France) F Serra	6	6

Second round
5	(Spain) Ó Hernández	6
Q	(Czech Republic) L Chramosta	2	r
SE	(Spain) A Ramos Viñolas	3	2
(Germany) F Mayer	6	6
(Spain) S Ventura	7	6
(Spain) R Ramírez Hidalgo	6^{3}	3
(Czech Republic) J Vaněk	4	1
2	(France) F Serra	6	6

Quarterfinals
5	(Spain) Ó Hernández	7	6
(Germany) F Mayer	5	3
(Spain) S Ventura	3	4
2	(France) F Serra	6	6

Semifinals
5	(Spain) Ó Hernández	6^{6}	1
2	(France) F Serra	7	6
