= 2018 Pekao Szczecin Open – Singles =

Singles
- 2018 Pekao Szczecin Open

Final
- Champion: (Argentina) Guido Andreozzi
- Runner-up: (Spain) Alejandro Davidovich Fokina
- Score: 6–4, 4–6, 6–3

Events
Singles	Doubles
- Pekao Szczecin Open

Richard Gasquet was the defending champion but chose not to defend his title.

Guido Andreozzi won the title after defeating Alejandro Davidovich Fokina 6–4, 4–6, 6–3 in the final.

== Seeds ==
1. (Italy) Paolo Lorenzi (first round)
2. (Spain) Roberto Carballés Baena (second round)
3. (Argentina) Federico Delbonis (withdrew)
4. (Argentina) Guido Andreozzi (champion)
5. (Brazil) Thiago Monteiro (second round)
6. (Italy) Lorenzo Sonego (first round)
7. (Norway) Casper Ruud (first round)
8. (Italy) Simone Bolelli (second round)

== Draw ==
Key

- Q = Qualifier
- WC = Wild card
- LL = Lucky loser
- Alt = Alternate
- ITF = ITF entry
- PR = Protected ranking
- SR = Special ranking
- SE = Special exempt
- JE = Junior exempt
- JR = Junior Accelerator Programme entrant
- CO = College Accelerator Programme entrant
- NG = Next Gen Accelerator Program entrant
- w/o = Walkover
- r = Retired
- d = Defaulted

=== Finals ===
Semifinals
Q	(Spain) Alejandro Davidovich Fokina	6	2	6
(Germany) Rudolf Molleker	1	6	2
4	(Argentina) Guido Andreozzi	3	7^{7}	6
Q	(Argentina) Facundo Argüello	6	6^{4}	4

Final
Q	(Spain) Alejandro Davidovich Fokina	4	6	3
4	(Argentina) Guido Andreozzi	6	4	6

=== Top half ===
First round
1	(Italy) P Lorenzi	4	6	5
(Spain) S Gutiérrez Ferrol	6	3	7
(Italy) S Caruso	4	2
Q	(Spain) A Davidovich Fokina	6	6
WC	(Poland) K Drzewiecki	3	4
(Italy) G Quinzi	6	6
Q	(Chile) MT Barrios Vera	7^{7}	7^{7}
7	(Norway) C Ruud	6^{3}	6^{5}
LL	(Russia) I Gakhov	2	6^{5}
(Italy) A Arnaboldi	6	7^{7}
LL	(Italy) R Marcora	6	6
(Czech Republic) Z Kolář	3	2
(Germany) R Molleker	6	6
WC	(Poland) Maciej Rajski	3	2
SE	(Slovakia) A Molčan	0	2
5	(Brazil) T Monteiro	6	6

Second round
(Spain) S Gutiérrez Ferrol	5	6^{0}
Q	(Spain) A Davidovich Fokina	7	7^{7}
(Italy) G Quinzi	6	6
Q	(Chile) MT Barrios Vera	1	3
(Italy) A Arnaboldi	2	4
LL	(Italy) R Marcora	6	6
(Germany) R Molleker	6	7
5	(Brazil) T Monteiro	3	5

Quarterfinals
Q	(Spain) A Davidovich Fokina	7^{7}	0	6
(Italy) G Quinzi	6^{3}	6	4
LL	(Italy) R Marcora	2	4
(Germany) R Molleker	6	6

Semifinals
Q	(Spain) A Davidovich Fokina	6	2	6
(Germany) R Molleker	1	6	2

=== Bottom half ===
First round
6	(Italy) L Sonego	2	6	4
(Russia) A Vatutin	6	1	6
(Italy) L Giustino	6^{10}	6	7^{8}
(Germany) D Brown	7^{12}	1	6^{6}
(Italy) GM Moroni	2	2
(Spain) M Vilella Martínez	6	6
Q	(Czech Republic) J Šátral	4	2
4	(Argentina) G Andreozzi	6	6
8	(Italy) S Bolelli	7	4	6
(France) K de Schepper	5	6	2
(Brazil) R Dutra Silva	7	6
WC	(Poland) Paweł Ciaś	5	3
Q	(Argentina) F Argüello	7	2
WC	(Spain) N Almagro	5	1^{r}
(Spain) T Robredo	6^{4}	6^{5}
2	(Spain) R Carballés Baena	7^{7}	7^{7}

Second round
(Russia) A Vatutin	6^{10}	6	6
(Italy) L Giustino	7^{12}	1	0
(Spain) M Vilella Martínez	4	3
4	(Argentina) G Andreozzi	6	6
8	(Italy) S Bolelli	2	4
(Brazil) R Dutra Silva	6	6
Q	(Argentina) F Argüello	7^{7}	6
2	(Spain) R Carballés Baena	6^{4}	3

Quarterfinals
(Russia) A Vatutin	5	6	1
4	(Argentina) G Andreozzi	7	1	6
(Brazil) R Dutra Silva	6	3	2
Q	(Argentina) F Argüello	4	6	6

Semifinals
4	(Argentina) G Andreozzi	3	7^{7}	6
Q	(Argentina) F Argüello	6	6^{4}	4
