= 2009 Pekao Szczecin Open =

- Date: September 14 - September 20
- Edition: 17th
- Location: Szczecin, Poland

Champions

Singles
- (Russia) Evgeny Korolev

Doubles
- (Poland) Tomasz Bednarek / (Poland) Mateusz Kowalczyk
- Pekao Szczecin Open

The 2009 Pekao Szczecin Open was a professional tennis tournament played on outdoor red clay courts. It was the seventeenth edition of the tournament which was part of the Tretorn SERIE+ of the 2009 ATP Challenger Tour. It took place in Szczecin, Poland between 14 and 20 September 2009.

== Singles main draw entrants ==
=== Seeds ===
Nationality	Player	Ranking*	Seeding
ESP	Albert Montañés	58	1
FRA	Florent Serra	61	2
AUS	Peter Luczak	78	3
RUS	Evgeny Korolev	80	4
ESP	Óscar Hernández	83	5
ESP	Alberto Martín	93	6
POR	Frederico Gil	106	7
USA	Michael Russell	112	8

- Rankings are as of August 31, 2009.

=== Other entrants ===
The following players received wildcards into the singles main draw:

- (Poland) Marcin Gawron
- (Poland) Rafał Gozdur
- (Spain) Albert Montañés
- (Poland) Grzegorz Panfil

The following players received a Special Exempt into the singles main draw:

- (Spain) Albert Ramos-Viñolas

The following players received entry from the qualifying draw:

- (Czech Republic) Ladislav Chramosta
- (Poland) Mateusz Kowalczyk
- (France) Axel Michon
- (Russia) Dmitri Sitak

== Champions ==
=== Singles ===
(Russia) Evgeny Korolev def. (France) Florent Serra, 6–4, 6–3

=== Doubles ===
(Poland) Tomasz Bednarek / (Poland) Mateusz Kowalczyk def. (Ukraine) Oleksandr Dolgopolov Jr. / (Ukraine) Artem Smirnov, 6–3, 6–4
