= 2017 Pekao Szczecin Open =

- Date: 9–17 September
- Edition: 25th
- Surface: Clay
- Location: Szczecin, Poland

Champions

Singles
- (France) Richard Gasquet

Doubles
- (Netherlands) Wesley Koolhof / (New Zealand) Artem Sitak
- Pekao Szczecin Open

The 2017 Pekao Szczecin Open was a professional tennis tournament played on clay courts. It was the 25th edition of the tournament which was part of the 2017 ATP Challenger Tour. It took place in Szczecin, Poland between 9 and 17 September 2017.

== Singles main-draw entrants ==
=== Seeds ===
Country	Player	Rank^{1}	Seed
FRA	Richard Gasquet	30	1
GER	Florian Mayer	74	2
ITA	Alessandro Giannessi	91	3
ARG	Carlos Berlocq	95	4
ITA	Marco Cecchinato	102	5
POL	Jerzy Janowicz	110	6
NOR	Casper Ruud	112	7
ARG	Renzo Olivo	114	8

^{1} Rankings are as of 28 August 2017.

=== Other entrants ===
The following players received wildcards into the singles main draw:

- (Poland) Adrian Andrzejczuk
- (Poland) Karol Drzewiecki
- (France) Richard Gasquet
- (Poland) Marcin Gawron

The following players received entry into the singles main draw as special exempts:

- (Belgium) Julien Cagnina
- (Estonia) Jürgen Zopp

The following players received entry from the qualifying draw:

- (Argentina) Guillermo Durán
- (Ukraine) Artem Smirnov
- (Czech Republic) Robin Staněk
- (France) Maxime Tabatruong

The following players received entry as lucky losers:

- (Belarus) Aliaksandr Bury
- (Czech Republic) Marek Jaloviec
- (France) Constant Lestienne

== Champions ==
=== Singles ===
- (France) Richard Gasquet def. (Germany) Florian Mayer 7–6^{(7–3)}, 7–6^{(7–4)}.

=== Doubles ===
- (Netherlands) Wesley Koolhof / (New Zealand) Artem Sitak def. (Belarus) Aliaksandr Bury / (Sweden) Andreas Siljeström 6–1, 7–5.
