= 2018 Pekao Szczecin Open =

- Date: 10–16 September
- Edition: 26th
- Surface: Clay
- Location: Szczecin, Poland

Champions

Singles
- (Argentina) Guido Andreozzi

Doubles
- (Poland) Karol Drzewiecki / (Slovakia) Filip Polášek
- Pekao Szczecin Open

The 2018 Pekao Szczecin Open was a professional tennis tournament played on clay courts. It was the 26th edition of the tournament which was part of the 2018 ATP Challenger Tour. It took place in Szczecin, Poland between 10 and 16 September 2018.

== Singles main-draw entrants ==
=== Seeds ===
Country	Player	Rank^{1}	Seed
ITA	Paolo Lorenzi	94	1
ESP	Roberto Carballés Baena	97	2
~~ARG~~	~~Federico Delbonis~~	~~111~~	~~3~~
ARG	Guido Andreozzi	113	4
BRA	Thiago Monteiro	118	5
ITA	Lorenzo Sonego	121	6
NOR	Casper Ruud	143	7
ITA	Simone Bolelli	144	8

^{1} Rankings are as of 27 August 2018.

=== Other entrants ===
The following players received wildcards into the singles main draw:

- (Spain) Nicolás Almagro
- (Poland) Paweł Ciaś
- (Poland) Karol Drzewiecki
- (Poland) Maciej Rajski

The following player received entry into the singles main draw as a special exempt:

- (Slovakia) Alex Molčan

The following players received entry from the qualifying draw:

- (Argentina) Facundo Argüello
- (Chile) Marcelo Tomás Barrios Vera
- (Spain) Alejandro Davidovich Fokina
- (Czech Republic) Jan Šátral

The following players received entry as lucky losers:

- (Russia) Ivan Gakhov
- (Italy) Roberto Marcora

== Champions ==
=== Singles ===
- (Argentina) Guido Andreozzi def. (Spain) Alejandro Davidovich Fokina 6–4, 4–6, 6–3.

=== Doubles ===
- (Poland) Karol Drzewiecki / (Slovakia) Filip Polášek def. (Argentina) Guido Andreozzi / (Argentina) Guillermo Durán 6–3, 6–4.
