= 2015 Pekao Szczecin Open =

- Date: 14–20 September
- Edition: 23rd
- Surface: Clay
- Location: Szczecin, Poland

Champions

Singles
- (Germany) Jan-Lennard Struff

Doubles
- (France) Tristan Lamasine / (France) Fabrice Martin
- Pekao Szczecin Open

The 2015 Pekao Szczecin Open was a professional tennis tournament played on clay courts. It was the 23rd edition of the tournament which was part of the 2015 ATP Challenger Tour. It took place in Szczecin, Poland between 14 and 23 September 2015.

== Singles main-draw entrants ==
=== Seeds ===
Country	Player	Rank^{1}	Seed
ESP	Pablo Carreño	54	1
NED	Robin Haase	79	2
SRB	Filip Krajinović	102	3
ITA	Marco Cecchinato	106	4
ESP	Íñigo Cervantes	112	5
ESP	Nicolás Almagro	114	6
GER	Jan-Lennard Struff	115	7
ESP	Albert Montañés	126	8

- ^{1} Rankings are as of September 7, 2015.

=== Other entrants ===
The following players received wildcards into the singles main draw:

- (Poland) Paweł Ciaś
- (Poland) Marcin Gawron
- (Poland) Hubert Hurkacz
- (Germany) Oscar Otte

The following players received entry from the qualifying draw:

- (Germany) Robin Kern
- (Poland) Mateusz Kowalczyk
- (Poland) Maciej Rajski
- (Ukraine) Artem Smirnov

== Champions ==
=== Singles ===
- (Germany) Jan-Lennard Struff def. (Ukraine) Artem Smirnov 6–3, 6–4

=== Doubles ===
- (France) Tristan Lamasine / (France) Fabrice Martin def. (Italy) Federico Gaio / (Italy) Alessandro Giannessi 6–3, 7–6^{(7–4)}
