= 2012 Pekao Szczecin Open =

- Date: 17–23 September
- Edition: 20th
- Surface: Clay
- Location: Szczecin, Poland

Champions

Singles
- (Romania) Victor Hănescu

Doubles
- (Germany) Andre Begemann / (Germany) Martin Emmrich
- Pekao Szczecin Open

The 2012 Pekao Szczecin Open was a professional tennis tournament played on clay courts. It was the 20th edition of the tournament which was part of the 2012 ATP Challenger Tour. It took place in Szczecin, Poland between 17 and 23 September 2012.

== Singles main draw entrants ==
=== Seeds ===
Country	Player	Rank^{1}	Seed
ITA	Filippo Volandri	69	1
GER	Björn Phau	74	2
POL	Jerzy Janowicz	84	3
ESP	Albert Montañés	86	4
ROU	Victor Hănescu	97	5
ARG	Federico Delbonis	128	6
FRA	Guillaume Rufin	129	7
POR	Rui Machado	132	8

- ^{1} Rankings are as of September 10, 2012.

=== Other entrants ===
The following players received wildcards into the singles main draw:

- (Poland) Marcin Gawron
- (Poland) Arkadiusz Kocyla
- (Poland) Grzegorz Panfil
- (Poland) Michał Przysiężny

The following players received entry from the qualifying draw:

- (Argentina) Guido Andreozzi
- (Poland) Piotr Gadomski
- (Russia) Alexander Rumyantsev
- (Ukraine) Artem Smirnov

== Champions ==
=== Singles ===
- (Romania) Victor Hănescu def. (Spain) Iñigo Cervantes Huegun, 6–4, 7–5

=== Doubles ===
- (Germany) Andre Begemann / (Germany) Martin Emmrich def. (Poland) Tomasz Bednarek / (Poland) Mateusz Kowalczyk, 3–6, 6–1, [10–3]
