= 2022 Pekao Szczecin Open =

- Date: 12–18 September
- Edition: 29th
- Surface: Clay
- Location: Szczecin, Poland

Champions

Singles
- (France) Corentin Moutet

Doubles
- (Jamaica) Dustin Brown / (Italy) Andrea Vavassori
- Pekao Szczecin Open

The 2022 Pekao Szczecin Open was a professional tennis tournament played on clay courts. It was the 29th edition of the tournament which was part of the 2022 ATP Challenger Tour. It took place in Szczecin, Poland between 12 and 18 September 2022.

== Singles main-draw entrants ==
=== Seeds ===
Country	Player	Rank^{1}	Seed
ARG	Federico Coria	78	1
ESP	Roberto Carballés Baena	80	2
TPE	Tseng Chun-hsin	89	3
FRA	Corentin Moutet	112	4
ESP	Carlos Taberner	116	5
ARG	Federico Delbonis	134	6
AUT	Dennis Novak	136	7
ITA	Marco Cecchinato	142	8

^{1} Rankings are as of 29 August 2022.

=== Other entrants ===
The following players received wildcards into the singles main draw:

- (Poland) Jerzy Janowicz
- (Poland) Maks Kaśnikowski
- (Poland) Daniel Michalski

The following players received entry from the qualifying draw:

- (Italy) Mattia Bellucci
- (United Kingdom) Jan Choinski
- (Ukraine) Georgii Kravchenko
- (Czech Republic) Martin Krumich
- (Germany) Rudolf Molleker
- (France) Luca Van Assche

The following player received entry as a lucky loser:

- (Germany) Louis Wessels

== Champions ==
=== Singles ===
- (France) Corentin Moutet def. (Austria) Dennis Novak 6–2, 6–7^{(5–7)}, 6–4.

=== Doubles ===
- (Jamaica) Dustin Brown / (Italy) Andrea Vavassori def. (Czech Republic) Roman Jebavý / (Czech Republic) Adam Pavlásek 6–4, 5–7, [10–8].
