= 2015 Pekao Szczecin Open – Doubles =

Doubles
- 2015 Pekao Szczecin Open

Final
- Champions: (France) Tristan Lamasine (France) Fabrice Martin
- Runners-up: (Italy) Federico Gaio (Italy) Alessandro Giannessi
- Score: 6–3, 7–6^{(7–4)}

Events
Singles	Doubles
- Pekao Szczecin Open

Dustin Brown and Jan-Lennard Struff are the defending champions, but only Struff defended his title partnering Frank Moser.

== Seeds ==
1. (Czech Republic) František Čermák / (New Zealand) Artem Sitak (semifinals)
2. (United Kingdom) Ken Skupski / (United Kingdom) Neal Skupski (first round)
3. (Germany) Frank Moser / (Germany) Jan-Lennard Struff (quarterfinals)
4. (Italy) Alessandro Motti / (Romania) Costin Pavăl (first round)

== Draw ==
Key

- Q = Qualifier
- WC = Wild card
- LL = Lucky loser
- Alt = Alternate
- ITF = ITF entry
- PR = Protected ranking
- SR = Special ranking
- SE = Special exempt
- JE = Junior exempt
- JR = Junior Accelerator Programme entrant
- CO = College Accelerator Programme entrant
- NG = Next Gen Accelerator Program entrant
- w/o = Walkover
- r = Retired
- d = Defaulted

First round
1	(Czech Republic) F Čermák (New Zealand) A Sitak	7^{7}	6
(Czech Republic) J Mertl (Czech Republic) M Michalička	6^{3}	2
(Poland) M Gawron (Poland) A Kapaś	6	5	[5]
(Netherlands) Romano Frantzen (Netherlands) R Haase	2	7	[10]
3	(Germany) F Moser (Germany) J-L Struff	6	6
WC	(Poland) Filip Ambrozy (Spain) M Fornell	0	0
WC	(Poland) H Hurkacz (Poland) S Walków	5	3
(France) T Lamasine (France) F Martin	7	6
(Italy) F Gaio (Italy) A Giannessi	6	6
WC	(Poland) K Majchrzak (Poland) J Zieliński	3	2
(Italy) A Arnaboldi (Italy) M Cecchinato	6	7^{7}
4	(Italy) A Motti (Romania) C Pavăl	3	6^{3}
(Estonia) V Ivanov (France) M Teixeira	6	4	[12]
(Argentina) R Olivo (Brazil) F Romboli	4	6	[10]
(Poland) T Bednarek (Poland) M Kowalczyk	2	6	[10]
2	(United Kingdom) K Skupski (United Kingdom) N Skupski	6	4	[8]

Quarterfinals
1	(Czech Republic) F Čermák (New Zealand) A Sitak	6	6
(Netherlands) R Frantzen (Netherlands) R Haase	1	4
3	(Germany) F Moser (Germany) J-L Struff	4	2
(France) T Lamasine (France) F Martin	6	6
(Italy) F Gaio (Italy) A Giannessi	7	6
(Italy) A Arnaboldi (Italy) M Cecchinato	5	2
(Estonia) V Ivanov (France) M Teixeira	4	6^{2}
(Poland) T Bednarek (Poland) M Kowalczyk	6	7^{7}

Semifinals
1	(Czech Republic) F Čermák (New Zealand) A Sitak	6^{6}	4
(France) T Lamasine (France) F Martin	7^{8}	6
(Italy) F Gaio (Italy) A Giannessi	7	7^{7}
(Poland) T Bednarek (Poland) M Kowalczyk	5	6^{5}

Final
(France) T Lamasine (France) F Martin	6	7^{7}
(Italy) F Gaio (Italy) A Giannessi	3	6^{4}
