= 2017 Pekao Szczecin Open – Doubles =

Doubles
- 2017 Pekao Szczecin Open

Final
- Champions: (Netherlands) Wesley Koolhof (New Zealand) Artem Sitak
- Runners-up: (Belarus) Aliaksandr Bury (Sweden) Andreas Siljeström
- Score: 6–1, 7–5

Events
Singles	Doubles
- Pekao Szczecin Open

Andre Begemann and Aliaksandr Bury were the defending champions but only Bury chose to defend his title, partnering Andreas Siljeström. Bury lost in the final to Wesley Koolhof and Artem Sitak.

Koolhof and Sitak won the title after defeating Bury and Siljeström 6–1, 7–5 in the final.

== Seeds ==
1. (Netherlands) Wesley Koolhof / (New Zealand) Artem Sitak (champions)
2. (Argentina) Guillermo Durán / (Spain) David Marrero (first round)
3. (United Kingdom) Ken Skupski / (United Kingdom) Neal Skupski (first round)
4. (Belarus) Aliaksandr Bury / (Sweden) Andreas Siljeström (final)

== Draw ==
Key

- Q = Qualifier
- WC = Wild card
- LL = Lucky loser
- Alt = Alternate
- ITF = ITF entry
- PR = Protected ranking
- SR = Special ranking
- SE = Special exempt
- JE = Junior exempt
- JR = Junior Accelerator Programme entrant
- CO = College Accelerator Programme entrant
- NG = Next Gen Accelerator Program entrant
- w/o = Walkover
- r = Retired
- d = Defaulted

First round
1	(Netherlands) W Koolhof (New Zealand) A Sitak	7	6
(Argentina) G Andreozzi (Uruguay) A Behar	5	4
(Poland) T Bednarek (Netherlands) D Pel	6	6
WC	(Poland) Filip Ambroży (Spain) M Fornell Mestres	0	4
3	(United Kingdom) K Skupski (United Kingdom) N Skupski	6^{4}	4
(Italy) A Motti (Portugal) G Oliveira	7^{7}	6
(Italy) S Caruso (Italy) A Giannessi	1	6	[10]
WC	(Poland) Michał Dembek (Poland) G Panfil	6	3	[4]
(Germany) D Brown (Germany) A Mies	3	7^{7}	[8]
WC	(Poland) Adrian Andrzejczuk (Ukraine) A Smirnov	6	6^{4}	[10]
(Japan) T Daniel (United States) B Fratangelo	4	6	[5]
4	(Belarus) A Bury (Sweden) A Siljeström	6	4	[10]
Q	(Poland) K Drzewiecki (Poland) M Gawron	6	7
(Spain) Í Cervantes (Spain) B Zapata Miralles	4	5
(France) K de Schepper (Argentina) R Olivo	1	6	[11]
2	(Argentina) G Durán (Spain) D Marrero	6	4	[9]

Quarterfinals
1	(Netherlands) W Koolhof (New Zealand) A Sitak	7	3	[10]
(Poland) T Bednarek (Netherlands) D Pel	5	6	[4]
(Italy) A Motti (Portugal) G Oliveira	6	6
(Italy) S Caruso (Italy) A Giannessi	3	4
WC	(Poland) A Andrzejczuk (Ukraine) A Smirnov	2	2
4	(Belarus) A Bury (Sweden) A Siljeström	6	6
Q	(Poland) K Drzewiecki (Poland) M Gawron	3	6	[5]
(France) K de Schepper (Argentina) R Olivo	6	3	[10]

Semifinals
1	(Netherlands) W Koolhof (New Zealand) A Sitak	6	6
(Italy) A Motti (Portugal) G Oliveira	4	3
4	(Belarus) A Bury (Sweden) A Siljeström	w/o
(France) K de Schepper (Argentina) R Olivo

Final
1	(Netherlands) W Koolhof (New Zealand) A Sitak	6	7
4	(Belarus) A Bury (Sweden) A Siljeström	1	5
