= 2014 Pekao Szczecin Open =

- Date: 8–14 September
- Edition: 22nd
- Surface: Clay
- Location: Szczecin, Poland

Champions

Singles
- (Germany) Dustin Brown

Doubles
- (Germany) Dustin Brown / (Germany) Jan-Lennard Struff
- Pekao Szczecin Open

The 2014 Pekao Szczecin Open was a professional tennis tournament played on clay courts. It was the 22nd edition of the tournament which was part of the 2014 ATP Challenger Tour. It took place in Szczecin, Poland between 8 and 14 September 2014.

== Singles main-draw entrants ==
=== Seeds ===
Country	Player	Rank^{1}	Seed
GER	Jan-Lennard Struff	77	1
GER	Dustin Brown	97	2
KAZ	Aleksandr Nedovyesov	107	3
ESP	Albert Montañés	114	4
GER	Andreas Beck	115	5
ESP	Pere Riba	116	6
ARG	Facundo Argüello	120	7
HUN	Márton Fucsovics	152	8

- ^{1} Rankings are as of September 1, 2014.

=== Other entrants ===
The following players received wildcards into the singles main draw:

- (Chile) Cristian Garín
- (Poland) Kamil Majchrzak
- (Poland) Grzegorz Panfil
- (Poland) Rafal Teurer

The following player received entry as a special exemption into the singles main draw:

- (France) Guillaume Rufin

The following players received entry from the qualifying draw:

- (Poland) Mateusz Kowalczyk
- (Poland) Błażej Koniusz
- (Russia) Philipp Davydenko
- (Poland) Marcin Gawron

== Champions ==
=== Singles ===
- (Germany) Dustin Brown def. (Germany) Jan-Lennard Struff, 6–4, 6–3

=== Doubles ===
- (Germany) Dustin Brown / (Germany) Jan-Lennard Struff def. (Poland) Tomasz Bednarek / (Slovakia) Igor Zelenay, 6–2, 6–4
