= 2016 Pekao Szczecin Open =

- Date: 12–18 September
- Edition: 24th
- Surface: Clay
- Location: Szczecin, Poland

Champions

Singles
- (Italy) Alessandro Giannessi

Doubles
- (Germany) Andre Begemann / (Belarus) Aliaksandr Bury
- Pekao Szczecin Open

The 2016 Pekao Szczecin Open was a professional tennis tournament played on clay courts. It was the 24th edition of the tournament which was part of the 2016 ATP Challenger Tour. It took place in Szczecin, Poland between 12 and 18 September 2016.

== Singles main-draw entrants ==
=== Seeds ===
Country	Player	Rank^{1}	Seed
ESP	Marcel Granollers	45	1
ESP	Íñigo Cervantes	75	2
GER	Dustin Brown	86	3
MDA	Radu Albot	97	4
GEO	Nikoloz Basilashvili	102	5
RUS	Teymuraz Gabashvili	105	6
ESP	Albert Montañés	135	7
ITA	Marco Cecchinato	140	8

- ^{1} Rankings are as of August 29, 2016.

=== Other entrants ===
The following players received wildcards into the singles main draw:

- (Spain) Marcel Granollers
- (Norway) Casper Ruud
- (Poland) Paweł Ciaś
- (Poland) Michał Przysiężny

The following player received entry into the singles main draw using a protected ranking:

- (Netherlands) Boy Westerhof

The following players received entry into the singles main draw as alternates:

- (France) Jonathan Eysseric
- (Italy) Stefano Napolitano

The following players received entry from the qualifying draw:

- (Estonia) Vladimir Ivanov
- (Germany) Peter Torebko
- (Czech Republic) Petr Michnev
- (Germany) Julian Reister

== Champions ==
=== Singles ===
- (Italy) Alessandro Giannessi def. (Germany) Dustin Brown, 6–2, 6–3.

=== Doubles ===
- (Germany) Andre Begemann / (Belarus) Aliaksandr Bury def. (Sweden) Johan Brunström / (Sweden) Andreas Siljeström, 7–6^{(7–2)}, 6–7^{(7–9)}, [10–4].
