= 2015 Pekao Szczecin Open – Singles =

Singles
- 2015 Pekao Szczecin Open

Final
- Champion: (Germany) Jan-Lennard Struff
- Runner-up: (Ukraine) Artem Smirnov
- Score: 6–4, 6–3

Events
Singles	Doubles
- Pekao Szczecin Open

Dustin Brown was the defending champion, but was nominated for Germany Davis Cup team this year.

== Seeds ==
1. (Spain) Pablo Carreño (quarterfinals)
2. (Netherlands) Robin Haase (second round)
3. (Serbia) Filip Krajinović (quarterfinals)
4. (Italy) Marco Cecchinato (semifinals, withdrew)
5. (Spain) Íñigo Cervantes (quarterfinals)
6. (Spain) Nicolás Almagro (semifinals)
7. (Germany) Jan-Lennard Struff (champion)
8. (Spain) Albert Montañés (first round)

== Draw ==
Key

- Q = Qualifier
- WC = Wild card
- LL = Lucky loser
- Alt = Alternate
- ITF = ITF entry
- PR = Protected ranking
- SR = Special ranking
- SE = Special exempt
- JE = Junior exempt
- JR = Junior Accelerator Programme entrant
- CO = College Accelerator Programme entrant
- NG = Next Gen Accelerator Program entrant
- w/o = Walkover
- r = Retired
- d = Defaulted

=== Finals ===
Semifinals
7	(Germany) Jan-Lennard Struff	6	4	7
6	(Spain) Nicolás Almagro	3	6	5
4	(Italy) Marco Cecchinato
Q	(Ukraine) Artem Smirnov	w/o

Final
7	(Germany) Jan-Lennard Struff	6	6
Q	(Ukraine) Artem Smirnov	4	3

=== Top half ===
First round
1	(Spain) P Carreño Busta	6	7
Q	(Germany) R Kern	4	5
(France) T Lamasine	3	3
WC	(Poland) H Hurkacz	6	6
(Poland) G Panfil	6	6
(France) M Teixeira	4	2
(Czech Republic) M Michalička	7^{8}	4	3
7	(Germany) J-L Struff	6^{6}	6	6
3	(Serbia) F Krajinović	6	7^{7}
(Italy) A Giannessi	1	6^{3}
(Italy) F Gaio	6	6
(Slovakia) Adrian Sikora	2	2
WC	(Poland) M Gawron	3	5
(Italy) F Volandri	6	7
(Kazakhstan) A Golubev	6^{5}	1
6	(Spain) N Almagro	7^{7}	6

Second round
1	(Spain) P Carreño Busta	3	6	6
WC	(Poland) H Hurkacz	6	4	3
(Poland) G Panfil	3	6^{3}
7	(Germany) J-L Struff	6	7^{7}
3	(Serbia) F Krajinović	7^{7}	4	6
(Italy) F Gaio	6^{0}	6	2
(Italy) F Volandri	6	5	1
6	(Spain) N Almagro	4	7	6

Quarterfinals
1	(Spain) P Carreño Busta	1	6^{1}
7	(Germany) J-L Struff	6	7^{7}
3	(Serbia) F Krajinović	5	1
6	(Spain) N Almagro	7	6

Semifinals
7	(Germany) J-L Struff	6	4	7
6	(Spain) N Almagro	3	6	5

=== Bottom half ===
First round
8	(Spain) A Montañés	5	4
(Argentina) R Olivo	7	6
(Italy) A Arnaboldi	7^{7}	4	3
WC	(Poland) Pawel Cias	6^{2}	6	6
(Belgium) J Cagnina	6	6
Q	(Poland) Maciej Rajski	1	0
Q	(Poland) M Kowalczyk	3	4
4	(Italy) M Cecchinato	6	6
5	(Spain) Í Cervantes	6	7
(Estonia) V Ivanov	1	5
(Czech Republic) J Mertl	1	6	6
WC	(Germany) O Otte	6	3	3
(Brazil) F Romboli	1	3
Q	(Ukraine) A Smirnov	6	6
(Poland) K Majchrzak	1	2
2	(Netherlands) R Haase	6	6

Second round
(Argentina) R Olivo	6	6
WC	(Poland) P Cias	3	1
(Belgium) J Cagnina	1	2
4	(Italy) M Cecchinato	6	6
5	(Spain) Í Cervantes	6	6
(Czech Republic) J Mertl	3	4
Q	(Ukraine) A Smirnov	6	4	6
2	(Netherlands) R Haase	3	6	4

Quarterfinals
(Argentina) R Olivo	2	7	4
4	(Italy) M Cecchinato	6	5	6
5	(Spain) Í Cervantes	6	1	5
Q	(Ukraine) A Smirnov	3	6	7

Semifinals
4	(Italy) M Cecchinato
Q	(Ukraine) A Smirnov	w/o
