= 2017 Pekao Szczecin Open – Singles =

Singles
- 2017 Pekao Szczecin Open

Final
- Champion: (France) Richard Gasquet
- Runner-up: (Germany) Florian Mayer
- Score: 7–6^{(7–3)}, 7–6^{(7–4)}

Events
Singles	Doubles
- Pekao Szczecin Open

Alessandro Giannessi was the defending champion but lost in the first round to Artem Smirnov.

Richard Gasquet won the title after defeating Florian Mayer 7–6^{(7–3)}, 7–6^{(7–4)} in the final.

== Seeds ==
1. (France) Richard Gasquet (champion)
2. (Germany) Florian Mayer (final)
3. (Italy) Alessandro Giannessi (first round)
4. (Argentina) Carlos Berlocq (first round)
5. (Italy) Marco Cecchinato (first round)
6. (Poland) Jerzy Janowicz (quarterfinals)
7. (Norway) Casper Ruud (first round)
8. (Argentina) Renzo Olivo (second round)

== Draw ==
Key

- Q = Qualifier
- WC = Wild card
- LL = Lucky loser
- Alt = Alternate
- ITF = ITF entry
- PR = Protected ranking
- SR = Special ranking
- SE = Special exempt
- JE = Junior exempt
- JR = Junior Accelerator Programme entrant
- CO = College Accelerator Programme entrant
- NG = Next Gen Accelerator Program entrant
- w/o = Walkover
- r = Retired
- d = Defaulted

=== Finals ===
Semifinals
1/WC	(France) Richard Gasquet	6	6
(Japan) Taro Daniel	4	4
SE	(Estonia) Jürgen Zopp	7	3	4
2	(Germany) Florian Mayer	5	6	6

Final
1/WC	(France) Richard Gasquet	7^{7}	7^{7}
2	(Germany) Florian Mayer	6^{3}	6^{4}

=== Top half ===
First round
1/WC	(France) R Gasquet	6	6
WC	(Poland) M Gawron	3	0
(Spain) B Zapata Miralles	6	6
Q	(Czech Republic) Robin Staněk	2	3
(Argentina) G Andreozzi	7^{7}	6
WC	(Poland) K Drzewiecki	6^{3}	2
(Spain) Í Cervantes	3	6	6
5	(Italy) M Cecchinato	6	4	4
4	(Argentina) C Berlocq	4	6^{2}
(United States) B Fratangelo	6	7^{7}
SE	(Belgium) J Cagnina	4	6	6
Q	(France) Maxime Tabatruong	6	3	2
(Japan) T Daniel	6	6
WC	(Poland) Adrian Andrzejczuk	2	4
(Italy) S Caruso	6	4	3
8	(Argentina) R Olivo	3	6	6

Second round
1/WC	(France) R Gasquet	6	6
(Spain) B Zapata Miralles	3	2
(Argentina) G Andreozzi	6	6
(Spain) Í Cervantes	3	3
(United States) B Fratangelo	3	6	6
SE	(Belgium) J Cagnina	6	2	3
(Japan) T Daniel	7	7
8	(Argentina) R Olivo	5	5

Quarterfinals
1/WC	(France) R Gasquet	4	7^{7}	6
(Argentina) G Andreozzi	6	6^{2}	4
(United States) B Fratangelo	3	2
(Japan) T Daniel	6	6

Semifinals
1/WC	(France) R Gasquet	6	6
(Japan) T Daniel	4	4

=== Bottom half ===
First round
7	(Norway) C Ruud	5	7^{7}	2
SE	(Estonia) J Zopp	7	6^{4}	6
LL	(Czech Republic) Marek Jaloviec	4	1
(Germany) Y Maden	6	6
LL	(Belarus) A Bury	3	4
(Germany) D Brown	6	6
Q	(Ukraine) A Smirnov	7^{7}	6
3	(Italy) A Giannessi	6^{4}	1
6	(Poland) J Janowicz	6	6
Q	(Argentina) G Durán	4	1
(France) K de Schepper	7	6
(Germany) O Otte	5	2
(Portugal) G Oliveira	3	6	6
LL	(France) C Lestienne	6	2	3
(France) G Sakharov	7	1	2
2	(Germany) F Mayer	5	6	6

Second round
SE	(Estonia) J Zopp	7	6
(Germany) Y Maden	5	4
(Germany) D Brown	7^{7}	4	7^{7}
Q	(Ukraine) A Smirnov	6^{4}	6	6^{5}
6	(Poland) J Janowicz	6	7^{7}
(France) K de Schepper	1	6^{2}
(Portugal) G Oliveira	4	4
2	(Germany) F Mayer	6	6

Quarterfinals
SE	(Estonia) J Zopp	6	4	6
(Germany) D Brown	2	6	4
6	(Poland) J Janowicz	2	6^{3}
2	(Germany) F Mayer	6	7^{7}

Semifinals
SE	(Estonia) J Zopp	7	3	4
2	(Germany) F Mayer	5	6	6
