= 2019 Pekao Szczecin Open =

- Date: 9–15 September
- Edition: 27th
- Surface: Clay
- Location: Szczecin, Poland

Champions

Singles
- (Slovakia) Jozef Kovalík

Doubles
- (Argentina) Guido Andreozzi / (Argentina) Andrés Molteni
- Pekao Szczecin Open

The 2019 Pekao Szczecin Open was a professional tennis tournament played on clay courts. It was the 27th edition of the tournament which was part of the 2019 ATP Challenger Tour. It took place in Szczecin, Poland between 9 and 15 September 2019.

== Singles main-draw entrants ==
=== Seeds ===
Country	Player	Rank^{1}	Seed
ESP	Albert Ramos Viñolas	51	1
ITA	Marco Cecchinato	66	2
GER	Philipp Kohlschreiber	71	3
ESP	Roberto Carballés Baena	76	4
ARG	Guido Andreozzi	106	5
ITA	Lorenzo Giustino	128	6
JPN	Taro Daniel	136	7
ITA	Gianluca Mager	142	8
ITA	Alessandro Giannessi	150	9
GER	Rudolf Molleker	160	10
ARG	Facundo Bagnis	164	11
ARG	Facundo Argüello	172	12
RUS	Alexey Vatutin	183	13
FRA	Constant Lestienne	201	14
FRA	Elliot Benchetrit	227	15
BRA	Thomaz Bellucci	257	16

^{1} Rankings are as of 26 August 2019.

=== Other entrants ===
The following players received wildcards into the singles main draw:

- (Poland) Paweł Ciaś
- (Poland) Karol Drzewiecki
- (Poland) Filip Kolasiński
- (Poland) Daniel Michalski
- (Spain) Albert Ramos Viñolas

The following player received entry into the singles main draw as an alternate:

- (Brazil) Oscar José Gutierrez

The following players received entry from the qualifying draw:

- (Poland) Piotr Galus
- (Poland) Kacper Żuk

The following player received entry as a lucky loser:

- (Poland) Maciej Smoła

== Champions ==
=== Singles ===
- (Slovakia) Jozef Kovalík def. (Argentina) Guido Andreozzi 6–7^{(5–7)}, 6–2, 6–4.

=== Doubles ===
- (Argentina) Guido Andreozzi / (Argentina) Andrés Molteni def. (Netherlands) Matwé Middelkoop / (Chile) Hans Podlipnik Castillo 6–4, 6–3.
