= Alejandro Davidovich Fokina =

Spanish tennis player (born 1999)

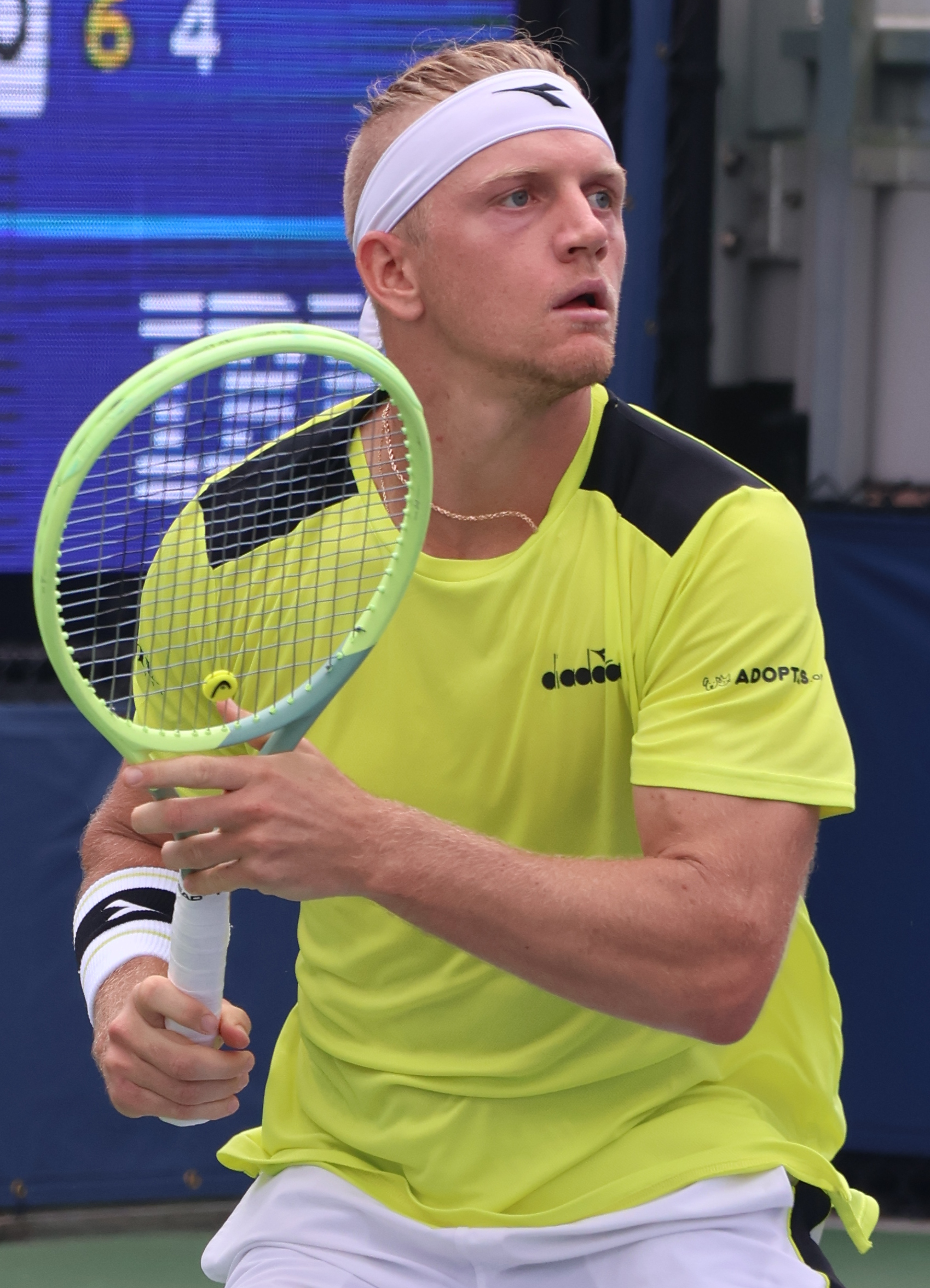
- Davidovich Fokina at the 2023 US Open
- Full name: Alejandro Davidovich Fokina
- Country (sports): Spain
- Born: 5 June 1999 (age 27) Rincón de la Victoria, Spain
- Height: 1.80 m (5 ft 11 in)
- Turned pro: 2017
- Plays: Right-handed (two-handed backhand)
- Coach: José Clavet, Mariano Puerta (2026), Félix Mantilla, David Sánchez (2025), Fernando Verdasco (2024), Jorge Aguirre (2009–2024)
- Prize money: US $13,598,539

Singles
- Career record: 191–161
- Career titles: 3
- Highest ranking: No. 13 (19 October 2026)
- Current ranking: No. 17 (9 November 2026)

Grand Slam singles results
- Australian Open: 4R (2025)
- French Open: QF (2021)
- Wimbledon: 4R (2026)
- US Open: 4R (2020, 2022)

Other tournaments
- Olympic Games: 3R (2021)

Doubles
- Career record: 13–27
- Career titles: 1
- Highest ranking: No. 196 (21 February 2022)

Grand Slam doubles results
- Australian Open: 1R (2022)
- French Open: 1R (2021)
- Wimbledon: 2R (2023)

Other doubles tournaments
- Olympic Games: 1R (2021)
- Last updated on: 19 October 2026.

Alejandro Davidovich Fokina (born 5 June 1999) is a Spanish professional tennis player. He has a career-high ATP singles ranking of world No. 13, achieved on 19 October 2026 and a best in doubles of No. 196, reached in February 2022. He is currently the No. 3 singles player from Spain.

Davidovich Fokina has won three ATP Tour singles titles, including a Masters 1000 trophy at the 2026 Shanghai Masters, as well as a doubles title at the 2020 Chile Open.

== Early life ==
Davidovich Fokina was born and raised in La Cala del Moral, Rincón de la Victoria, about 10 km away from Málaga, Spain, to Swedish-Russian father Eduard Mark Davidovich, and Russian mother Tatiana Fokina. His father is a former boxer. Davidovich Fokina has a brother, Mark. Alejandro began playing tennis with his father at the age of three. When he turned five, he started training at Calaflores and later Serramar tennis courts with coach Manolo Rubiales.

== Junior career ==
Davidovich Fokina was Spanish Champion at U12, U15 and U18 levels. He started his professional tennis career in 2016. He won his first ITF Grade 1 in Canada at the Repentigny Internationaux de Tennis Junior, defeating Félix Auger-Aliassime in the semifinal, and Liam Caruana in the final. In October, he won his first doubles title in a Futures held in Nigeria partnering French player Alexis Klégou. During 2017, as a junior, he made his ATP debut at the Barcelona Open Banc Sabadell in April thanks to a qualifying wild card. He defeated Roberto Carballés Baena in three sets. He lost in the second round of qualifying to Santiago Giraldo in three sets. He also reached the junior French Open semifinals, losing to Alexei Popyrin in straight sets.

He defeated Rudolf Molleker in the first round and won the 2017 Wimbledon boys' singles title without dropping a set, winning the final against Argentine Axel Geller.

== Professional career ==
=== 2018: First Challenger final ===
In 2018, he was the hitting partner for the Spanish Davis Cup team at the tie Spain vs. Great Britain held at Marbella. In March, Davidovich won his first ITF Futures 15K title at Quinta do Lago in Portugal, defeating Roberto Ortega Olmedo. He started playing the ATP Challenger Tour during the season.

He received his first qualifying wildcard for ATP Masters 1000 at Madrid where he lost against Taylor Fritz. At the ATP Lisbon Challenger in May, he defeated Alex de Minaur in the first round. He then lost to Christian Harrison in the second. In the second round of Wimbledon qualifying, he lost to Peter Polansky.

In September, Davidovich reached his first ATP Challenger final in Poland after defeating Molleker in the semifinal. He lost the final against Guido Andreozzi in three sets. During his Asian tour, he reached the quarterfinals at the Liuzhou Challenger and the semifinals at the Shenzhen Challenger.

=== 2019: Major debut, Challenger titles ===
Davidovich Fokina started the season playing the first round of Australian Open qualifying by defeating Daniel Gimeno Traver.

He reached the quarterfinals at the Chennai Challenger and the final at the Bangkok Challenger II, which he lost to James Duckworth. He made the semifinals at the Marbella Challenger on his home soil, losing to Pablo Andújar in three sets.

He played his first ATP main draw match, losing in the first round of the Grand Prix Hassan II to Philipp Kohlschreiber after winning two qualifying matches. Later in the month, he reached the semifinals of the 2019 Estoril Open as a qualifier, beating Gaël Monfils and Taylor Fritz along the way.

He entered in the main draw of his first Grand Slam at the 2019 French Open as a lucky loser.

Later in the year, he finally won his first ATP Challenger title, defeating Jaume Munar to win the Seville Challenger. Just a month after that triumph, he won his second Challenger title in Liuzhou, defeating Denis Istomin in the final.

=== 2020: First ATP doubles title, US Open fourth round ===
In 2020, Davidovich Fokina reached the second round of a Grand Slam for the first time at the 2020 Australian Open. He beat Norbert Gombos in a 5-set epic before falling to Diego Schwartzman.

He won his first ATP title in doubles at the 2020 Chile Open in Santiago, partnering with fellow Spaniard Roberto Carballés Baena, where they defeated 2nd seeded pair Marcelo Arévalo/Jonny O'Mara in the final.

He reached the second round of the 2020 French Open for the first time by defeating wildcard Harold Mayot before losing to 13th seed Andrey Rublev.

At the 2020 US Open, Davidovich Fokina reached the fourth round of a Grand Slam for the first time in his career, beating Dennis Novak, Hubert Hurkacz, and Cameron Norrie, before losing in straight sets to Alexander Zverev. In Cologne 1, he reached the semifinals, beating qualifier Emil Ruusuvuori, 8th seed Marin Cilic, and Dennis Novak before losing to eventual champion and top seed Alexander Zverev in straight sets.

He got his first Masters victory against 11th seed Karen Khachanov at the 2020 Paris Masters in 3 sets. He also beat wildcard Benjamin Bonzi in straight sets before being crushed by 6th seed Diego Schwartzman 6–1, 6–1.

=== 2021: French Open quarterfinal, Top 35 ===
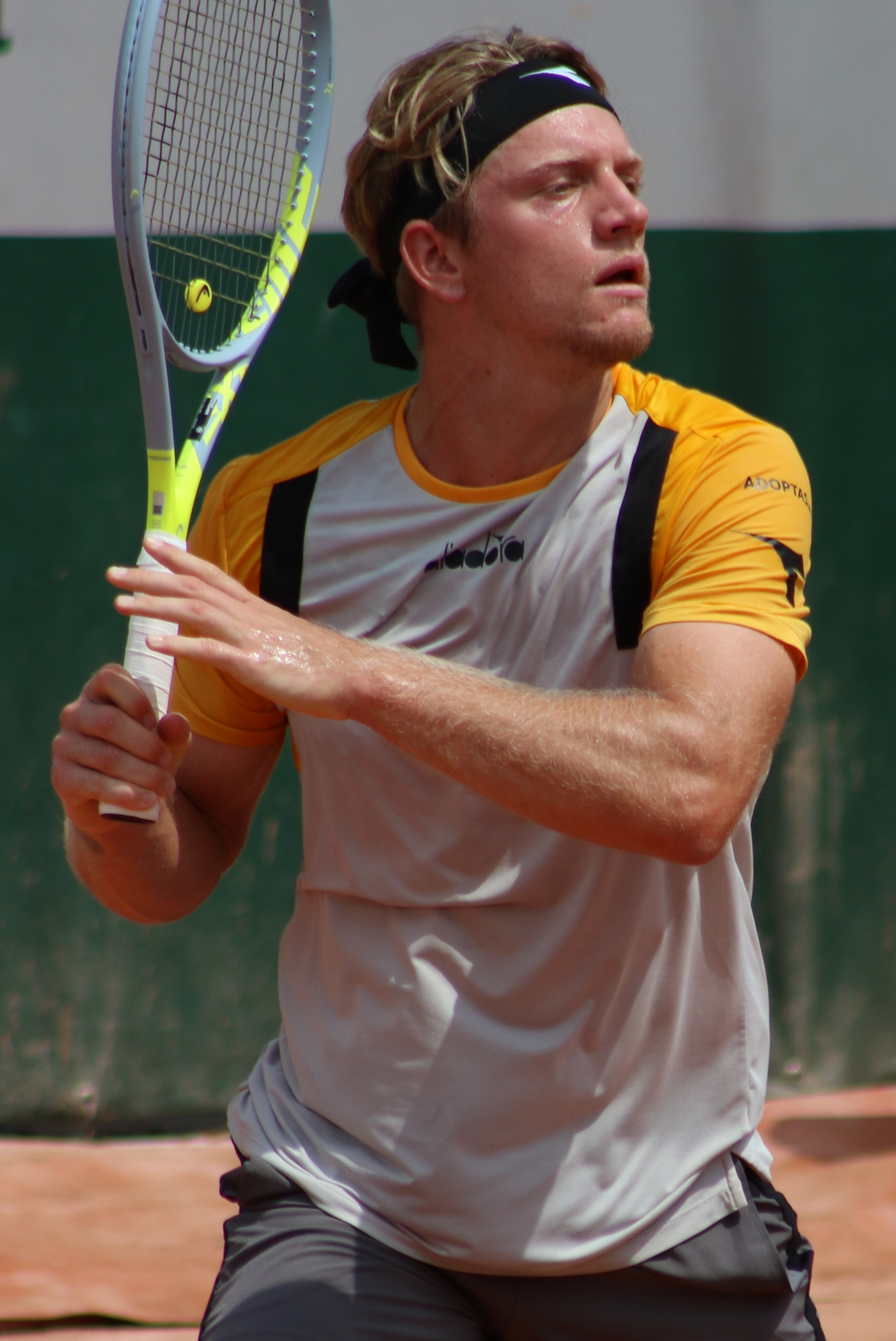
Davidovich Fokina at the 2021 French Open

Davidovich Fokina missed the Australian Open after testing positive for COVID-19. He started his season in February by playing at the Quimper Challenger. As the top seed, he retired during his first-round match against Thomas Fabbiano due to an ankle injury. As the top seed in Biella, he fell in the second round to Federico Gaio. At the Open Sud de France, he beat fourth seed Hubert Hurkacz in the second round. He lost in the quarterfinals to Egor Gerasimov. Playing at the Rotterdam Open, he was defeated in the second round by qualifier and eventual finalist, Márton Fucsovics. After Rotterdam, he competed at the Open 13 in Marseille. Seeded seventh, he was eliminated in the second round by French qualifier Arthur Rinderknech. At the Dubai Championships, he was beaten in the second round by 14th seed Filip Krajinović.

Davidovich Fokina started his clay-court season at the first edition of the Andalucía Open in Marbella, Spain. Seeded fifth, he lost in the second round to Ilya Ivashka. He had a great run at the Monte-Carlo Masters. He started the tournament by beating Alex de Minaur in the first round. He then got his first Top ten victory by defeating eighth seed and World N0. 10 Matteo Berrettini, in the second round. In the third round, he won over French wildcard Lucas Pouille to reach his first ATP Masters 1000 quarter-final. He retired after losing the first set during his quarterfinals match against fourth seed Stefanos Tsitsipas due to a left quadriceps injury. Due to his great result in Monte-Carlo, his ranking improved from 58 to 48. In Barcelona, he fell in the first round to Alexander Bublik. Seeded eighth at the Estoril Open, he made it to the semifinals where he was defeated by seventh seed, compatriot, and eventual champion, Albert Ramos Viñolas. At the Madrid Open, he defeated French qualifier Pierre-Hugues Herbert in the first round in three long sets. He was eliminated in the second round by second seed Daniil Medvedev. Getting past qualifying at the Italian Open, he reached the third round where he was beaten by top seed and five-time champion, Novak Djokovic. Ranked 46 at the French Open, he stunned 15th seed Casper Ruud in his third-round match to reach his second fourth round Grand Slam appearance. He then beat Federico Delbonis to reach his first Grand Slam quarterfinal. He ended up losing his quarterfinals match to sixth seed Alexander Zverev.

Seeded sixth at the Eastbourne International, Davidovich Fokina retired after losing the first set during his second-round match against Vasek Pospisil due to a lower back injury. Seeded 30th at Wimbledon, he fell in the first round to American Denis Kudla.

Representing Spain at the Summer Olympics, Davidovich Fokina lost in the third round to top seed Novak Djokovic.

=== 2022: Masters 1000 final, top 30 debut ===
At the Monte Carlo Masters, Davidovich Fokina recorded the biggest victory of his career by defeating world No. 1 Novak Djokovic in the second round. He progressed to the quarterfinals for the second year in a row by defeating David Goffin in the third round, then defeated Taylor Fritz and Grigor Dimitrov to reach his maiden career singles final. He became the first man to reach his maiden career final at a Masters tournament since Filip Krajinović in the 2017 Paris Masters. He then lost to Stefanos Tsitsipas. As a result, he reached the top 30 at world No. 27 on 18 April 2022. He recorded his first win at the 2022 Wimbledon Championships defeating top-10 player and 7th seed Hubert Hurkacz in a tight 3 1/2 hours five set match with a super tiebreak in the fifth after missing three match points. He lost his second round match to Jiri Vesely after being handed a second code violation and point penalty for ball-abuse on match point in the fifth set super tiebreak, after hitting the ball out of the court, in a nearly four hours marathon on court. At the US Open, Davidovich Fokina lost in the fourth round to Matteo Berrettini in five sets after twisting his knee in the fifth set.

=== 2023: Masters semifinal, fifth top 10 win ===
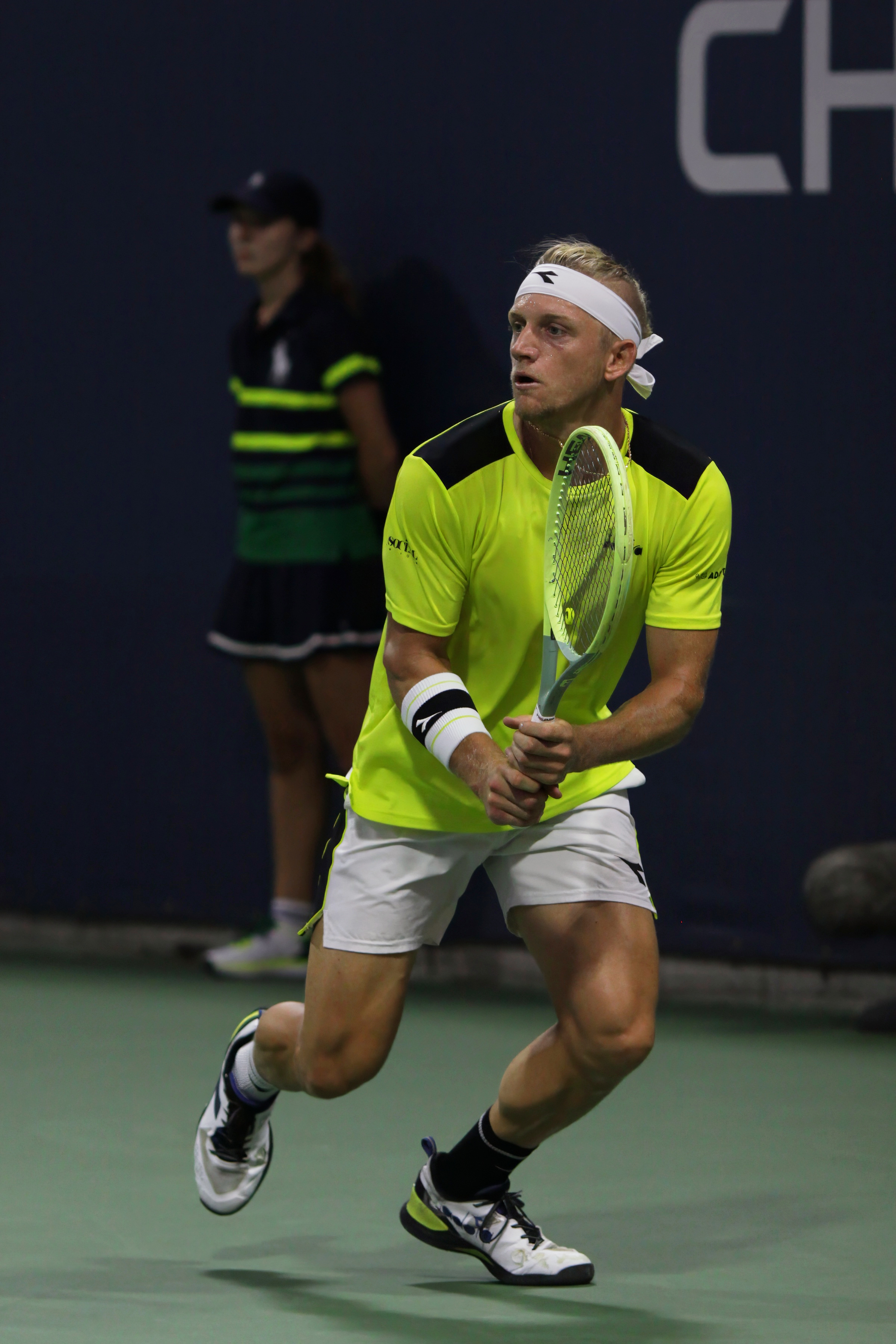
Davidovich Fokina at the 2023 US Open, round 2

At the 2023 BNP Paribas Open he reached the quarterfinals of a Masters 1000 for a third time in his career defeating wildcard Wu Yibing, 13th seed Karen Khachanov and qualifier Cristian Garín. As a result, he made his top 25 debut in the rankings on 20 March 2023.

At the 2023 National Bank Open he reached his second Masters semifinal overall and first on ATP level for the season in his sixth quarterfinal attempt defeating J. J. Wolf, 13th seed Alexander Zverev, third seed Casper Ruud and Mackenzie McDonald.

At the 2023 US Open, Davidovich Fokina defeated Marcos Giron and Juan Manuel Cerúndolo in his first two rounds in straight sets, before falling to 14th seed Tommy Paul in four sets.

=== 2024: 100th win, out of top 50 ===
He recorded his 100th win at the 2024 Open 13 Provence over Grégoire Barrère.

In May, he hired former tennis professional and compatriot Fernando Verdasco to coach him starting with the 2024 French Open.

He fell out of the top 50 on 12 August 2024, following the 2024 National Bank Open where he defeated third seed Daniil Medvedev in the second round but retired in the third against eventual semifinalist Matteo Arnaldi, failing to defend his semifinal points from the previous season.

=== 2025: Major fourth round, Masters semifinal, top 15 ===
Davidovich Fokina returned to form by winning two five set matches, both from two sets down, defeating Félix Auger-Aliassime and Jakub Menšík, to reach the fourth round of the 2025 Australian Open for the first time. He became the first man to win back-to-back matches from two sets down in 20 years at the AO.

In February, Davidovich Fokina reached two finals in a row at the Delray Beach Open and Acapulco Open, but lost to Miomir Kecmanović and Tomáš Macháč respectively. He returned to form on clay in April at the Monte Carlo Masters, winning four matches to reach the semifinals. He lost to eventual champion Carlos Alcaraz in two tight sets.

In July, Davidovich Fokina reached his fourth final at the Washington Open, upsetting again top seed Taylor Fritz in the quarterfinals and third seed Ben Shelton in the semifinals, his fourth and fifth top 10 wins of the season. He lost to Alex de Minaur in the final after failing to convert three match points. As a result, Fokina entered the top 20 on 28 July 2025 and became the only player in the top 20 without an ATP Tour title.

In October, Davidovich Fokina reached the final of the Swiss Indoors in Basel, losing to João Fonseca. At the subsequent Paris Masters, he was stopped in the round of 16 by Alexander Zverev. Thanks to his consistency, Davidovich Fokina climbed to ATP No. 15 at world No. 14 on 3 November 2025.

=== 2026: First three titles, Masters title, world no. 13 ===
Davidovich Fokina reached his first final on grass courts at his home tournament, the 2026 Mallorca Championships. After five runner-up finishes, he finally won his first title by defeating Ethan Quinn. In September, he also won the Chengdu Open, China, where he defeated Nikoloz Basilashvili in the semifinal and Hubert Hurkacz in the final. He defeated top-seed Alexander Zverev to reach the final of Shanghai Masters. He defeated compatriot Rafael Jódar, coming from a set and a break down to win his first masters title. As a result, he reached his career highest ranking of No. 13 in the following week.

== Playing style ==
Davidovich Fokina is known for having one of the best drop shots on the ATP Tour. His playing style could generally be described as aggressive, and his level tends to fluctuate over the course of a match. He also frequently deploys an underarm serve. Although he is not the tallest of players, he makes up for this disadvantage with his quick movement and powerful groundstrokes. Additionally, Davidovich Fokina can often be seen diving on courts of all surfaces, which leads to both wildly entertaining shotmaking and occasionally injury. He is also known for his excellent returns, often finding sharp angles.

== Performance timelines ==
Key
W	F	SF	QF	#R	RR	Q#	P#	DNQ	A	Z#	PO	G	S	B	NMS	NTI	P	NH

(W) winner; (F) finalist; (SF) semifinalist; (QF) quarterfinalist; (#R) rounds 4, 3, 2, 1; (RR) round-robin stage; (Q#) qualification round; (P#) preliminary round; (DNQ) did not qualify; (A) absent; (Z#) Davis/Fed Cup Zonal Group (with number indication) or (PO) play-off; (G) gold, (S) silver or (B) bronze Olympic/Paralympic medal; (NMS) not a Masters tournament; (NTI) not a Tier I tournament; (P) postponed; (NH) not held; (SR) strike rate (events won / competed); (W–L) win–loss record.
To avoid confusion and double counting, these charts are updated at the conclusion of a tournament or when the player's participation has ended.

=== Singles ===
Current through the 2026 Shanghai Masters.

Tournament	2018	2019	2020	2021	2022	2023	2024	2025	2026	SR	W–L	Win%
Grand Slam tournaments
Australian Open	A	Q2	2R	A	2R	2R	2R	4R	3R	0 / 6	9–6	60%
French Open	A	1R	2R	QF	1R	3R	2R	2R	2R	0 / 8	10–8	56%
Wimbledon	Q2	Q1	NH	1R	2R	3R	A	3R	4R	0 / 5	8–5	62%
US Open	A	Q1	4R	1R	4R	3R	1R	2R	A	0 / 6	9–6	60%
Win–loss	0–0	0–1	5–3	4–3	5–4	7–4	2–3	7–4	6–3	0 / 25	36–25	59%
ATP 1000 tournaments
Indian Wells Open	A	A	NH	2R	2R	QF	2R	1R	4R	0 / 6	7–6	54%
Miami Open	A	A	NH	A	1R	3R	3R	2R	2R	0 / 5	3–5	38%
Monte-Carlo Masters	A	A	NH	QF	F	1R	1R	SF	A	0 / 5	12–5	71%
Madrid Open	Q1	1R	NH	2R	2R	4R	3R	3R	3R	0 / 7	7–7	50%
Italian Open	A	A	1R	3R	2R	3R	2R	2R	3R	0 / 7	5–7	42%
Canadian Open	A	A	NH	1R	1R	SF	3R	4R	A	0 / 5	8–5	62%
Cincinnati Open	A	A	Q1	1R	1R	2R	1R	2R	A	0 / 5	1–5	17%
Shanghai Masters	A	A	NH			2R	2R	3R	W	1 / 4	8–3	73%
Paris Masters	A	A	3R	1R	1R	2R	~~1R~~ (Note: Davidovich Fokina qualified for the main draw of the 2024 Rolex Paris Masters, but withdrew before the first round of the tournament.)	3R		0 / 5	5–5	50%
Win–loss	0–0	0–1	2–2	7–7	8–8	13–9	5–8	11–9	10–4	1 / 49	56–48	54%
Career statistics
Tournaments	0	8	10	23	26	25	22	24	13	Career total: 156		
Titles	0	0	0	0	0	0	0	0	3	Career total: 3		
Finals	0	0	0	0	1	0	0	4	3	Career total: 8		
Overall win–loss	0–0	3–10	13–10	27–23	21–26	32–28	18–22	44–26	27–16	185–161		
Win %	–	23%	57%	54%	45%	53%	45%	63%	63%	53%		
Year-end ranking	237	87	52	50	31	26	61	14		$12,246,324		

== ATP Masters 1000 finals ==
=== Singles: 2 (1 title, 1 runner-up) ===
Result	Year	Tournament	Surface	Opponent	Score
Loss	2022	Monte-Carlo Masters	Clay	(Greece) Stefanos Tsitsipas	3–6, 6–7^{(3–7)}
Win	2026	Shanghai Masters	Hard	(Spain) Rafael Jódar	1–6, 7–6^{(7–5)}, 6–4

== ATP Tour finals ==
=== Singles: 8 (3 titles, 5 runner-ups) ===
Legend ATP 1000 (1–1) ATP 500 (0–3) ATP 250 (2–1)	Finals by surface Hard (2–4) Clay (0–1) Grass (1–0)	Finals by setting Outdoor (3–4) Indoor (0–1)

Result	W–L	Date	Tournament	Tier	Surface	Opponent	Score
Loss	0–1	Apr 2022	Monte-Carlo Masters, France	ATP 1000	Clay	(Greece) Stefanos Tsitsipas	3–6, 6–7^{(3–7)}
Loss	0–2	Feb 2025	Delray Beach Open, US	ATP 250	Hard	(Serbia) Miomir Kecmanović	6–3, 1–6, 5–7
Loss	0–3	Feb 2025	Mexican Open, Mexico	ATP 500	Hard	(Czech Republic) Tomáš Macháč	6–7^{(6–8)}, 2–6
Loss	0–4	Jul 2025	Washington Open, US	ATP 500	Hard	(Australia) Alex de Minaur	7–5, 1–6, 6–7^{(3–7)}
Loss	0–5	Oct 2025	Swiss Indoors, Switzerland	ATP 500	Hard (i)	(Brazil) João Fonseca	3–6, 4–6
Win	1–5	Jun 2026	Mallorca Open, Spain	ATP 250	Grass	(United States) Ethan Quinn	7–6^{(7–4)}, 6–3
Win	2–5	Sep 2026	Chengdu Open, China	ATP 250	Hard	(Poland) Hubert Hurkacz	6–4, 7–6^{(9–7)}
Win	3–5	Oct 2026	Shanghai Masters, China	ATP 1000	Hard	(Spain) Rafael Jódar	1–6, 7–6^{(7–5)}, 6–4

=== Doubles: 1 (title) ===
Legend ATP 250 (1–0)	Finals by surface Clay (1–0)	Finals by setting Outdoor (1–0)

Result	Date	Tournament	Tier	Surface	Partner	Opponents	Score
Win	Feb 2020	Chile Open, Chile	ATP 250	Clay	(Spain) Roberto Carballés Baena	(El Salvador) Marcelo Arévalo (United Kingdom) Jonny O'Mara	7–6^{(7–3)}, 6–1

== National and international representation ==
=== Team competitions finals: 2 (2 runner-ups) ===
Finals by tournament Davis Cup (0–0) Laver Cup (0–1) ATP Cup (0–1)	Finals by team Spain (0–1) Europe (0–1)

Result	W–L	Date	Tournament	Surface	Team	Partner(s)	Opponent team	Opponent(s)	Score
Loss	0–1	Jan 2022	ATP Cup, Sydney	Hard	Spain	Roberto Bautista Agut; Pablo Carreño Busta; Albert Ramos Viñolas; Pedro Martínez	Canada	Félix Auger-Aliassime; Denis Shapovalov; Brayden Schnur; Steven Diez	0–2
Loss	0–2	Sep 2023	Laver Cup, Vancouver	Hard (i)	Team Europe	Andrey Rublev; Casper Ruud; Hubert Hurkacz; Arthur Fils; Gaël Monfils	Team World	Taylor Fritz; Frances Tiafoe; Tommy Paul; Félix Auger-Aliassime; Ben Shelton; Francisco Cerúndolo	2–13

== ATP Challenger and ITF Tour finals ==
=== Singles: 9 (3 titles, 6 runner-ups) ===
Legend ATP Challenger (2–3) ITF Futures (1–3)	Finals by surface Hard (2–3) Clay (1–3)

Result	W–L	Date	Tournament	Tier	Surface	Opponent	Score
Loss	0–1	Sep 2018	Szczecin Open, Poland	Challenger	Clay	(Argentina) Guido Andreozzi	4–6, 6–4, 3–6
Loss	0–2	Feb 2019	Bangkok Challenger II, Thailand	Challenger	Hard	(Australia) James Duckworth	4–6, 3–6
Loss	0–3	Sep 2019	AON Open, Italy	Challenger	Clay	(Italy) Lorenzo Sonego	2–6, 6–4, 6–7^{(6–8)}
Win	1–3	Sep 2019	Copa Sevilla, Spain	Challenger	Clay	(Spain) Jaume Munar	2–6, 6–2, 6–2
Win	2–3	Oct 2019	Liuzhou Open, China	Challenger	Hard	(Uzbekistan) Denis Istomin	6–3, 5–7, 7–6^{(7–5)}
Loss	0–1	Jun 2017	F18 Palma del Río, Spain	Futures	Hard	(Italy) Matteo Viola	6–7^{(0–7)}, 5–7
Loss	0–2	Jul 2017	F19 Bakio, Spain	Futures	Hard	(Spain) Roberto Ortega Olmedo	6–0, 2–6, 1–6
Loss	0–3	Sep 2017	F27 San Sebastián, Spain	Futures	Clay	(Spain) Eduard Esteve Lobato	7–5, 0–6, 1–6
Win	1–3	Mar 2018	F4 Quinta do Lago, Portugal	Futures	Hard	(Spain) Roberto Ortega Olmedo	7–5, 4–6, 6–1

=== Doubles: 2 (1 title, 1 runner-up) ===
Legend ATP Challenger (–) ITF Futures (1–1)

Result	W–L	Date	Tournament	Tier	Surface	Partner	Opponents	Score
Win	1–0	Oct 2016	F6 Lagos, Nigeria	Futures	Hard	(Benin) Alexis Klégou	(Poland) Karol Drzewiecki (Poland) Maciej Smoła	6–4, 6–1
Loss	1–1	Sep 2017	F27 San Sebastián, Spain	Futures	Clay	(Benin) Alexis Klégou	(Spain) Íñigo Cervantes Huegun (Spain) Daniel Gimeno Traver	6–4, 5–7, [6–10]

== Wins over top 10 opponents ==
- Davidovich Fokina has a 14–36 record against players who were ranked in the top 10 at the time the match was played.

Year	2021	2022	2023	2024	2025	2026	Total
Wins	1	2	2	2	5	2	14

#	Player	Rk	Event	Surface	Rd	Score	Rk	Ref
2021
1.	(Italy) Matteo Berrettini	10	Monte-Carlo Masters, France	Clay	2R	7–5, 6–3	58	
2022
2.	(Serbia) Novak Djokovic	1	Monte-Carlo Masters, France	Clay	2R	6–3, 6–7^{(5–7)}, 6–1	46	
3.	(Poland) Hubert Hurkacz	10	Wimbledon, United Kingdom	Grass	1R	7–6^{(7–4)}, 6–4, 5–7, 2–6, 7–6^{(10–8)}	37	
2023
4.	(Denmark) Holger Rune	7	Madrid Open, Spain	Clay	3R	7–6^{(7–1)}, 5–7, 7–6^{(7–5)}	35	
5.	(Norway) Casper Ruud	5	Canadian Open, Canada	Hard	3R	7–6^{(7–4)}, 4–6, 7–6^{(7–4)}	37	
2024
6.	(Poland) Hubert Hurkacz	9	United Cup, Australia	Hard	RR	3–6, 6–3, 6–4	26	
7.	Daniil Medvedev	5	Canadian Open, Canada	Hard	2R	6–4, 1–6, 6–2	42	
2025
8.	(United States) Taylor Fritz	4	Delray Beach Open, United States	Hard	QF	7–6^{(7–4)}, 7–6^{(7–5)}	60	
9.	(United Kingdom) Jack Draper	6	Monte-Carlo Masters, France	Clay	3R	6–3, 6–7^{(6–8)}, 6–4	42	
10.	Andrey Rublev	8	Barcelona Open, Spain	Clay	2R	7–5, 6–4	30	
11.	(United States) Taylor Fritz	4	Washington Open, United States	Hard	QF	7–6^{(7–3)}, 3–6, 7–5	26	
12.	(United States) Ben Shelton	8	Washington Open, United States	Hard	SF	6–2, 7–5	26	
2026
13.	(United States) Frances Tiafoe	10	Shanghai Masters, China	Hard	3R	7–6^{(7–4)}, 4–6, 7–6^{(8–6)}	26	
14.	(Germany) Alexander Zverev	2	Shanghai Masters, China	Hard	SF	5–7, 6–4, 6–3	26	

== Junior Grand Slam finals ==
=== Singles: 1 (title) ===
Result	Year	Tournament	Surface	Opponent	Score
Win	2017	Wimbledon	Grass	(Argentina) Axel Geller	7–6^{(7–2)}, 6–3
