= Szczecin Open =

- 2025 Szczecin Open

ATP Challenger Tour
- Event name: Invest in Szczecin Open (2023-)
- Location: Szczecin, Poland
- Venue: Wojska Polskiego
- Category: ATP Challenger Tour 125, Tretorn SERIE+
- Surface: Clay (red)
- Draw: 32S/32Q/16D
- Prize money: €148,625
- Website: szczecinopen.pl

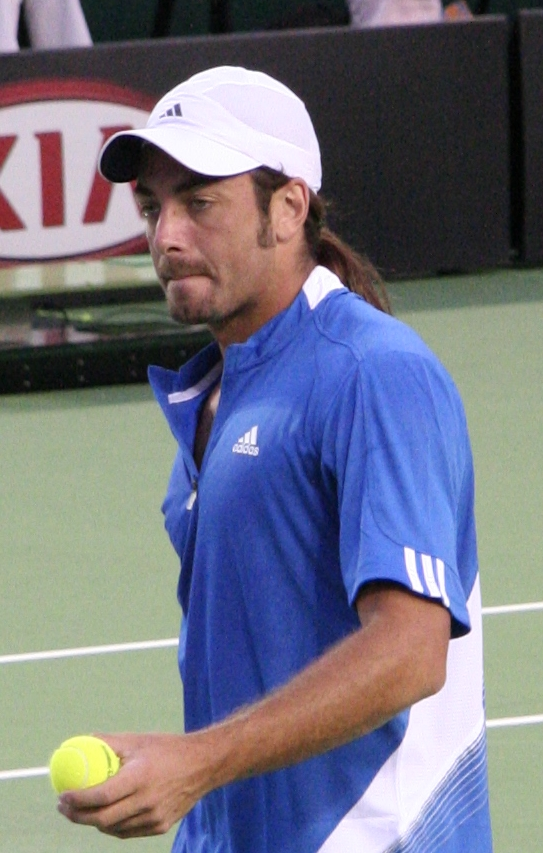
Eventual singles and doubles gold medalist for Chile Nicolás Massú won the singles in 2003

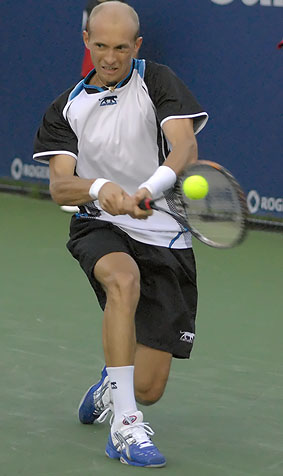
Russian top tenner Nikolay Davydenko took the singles title in 2002

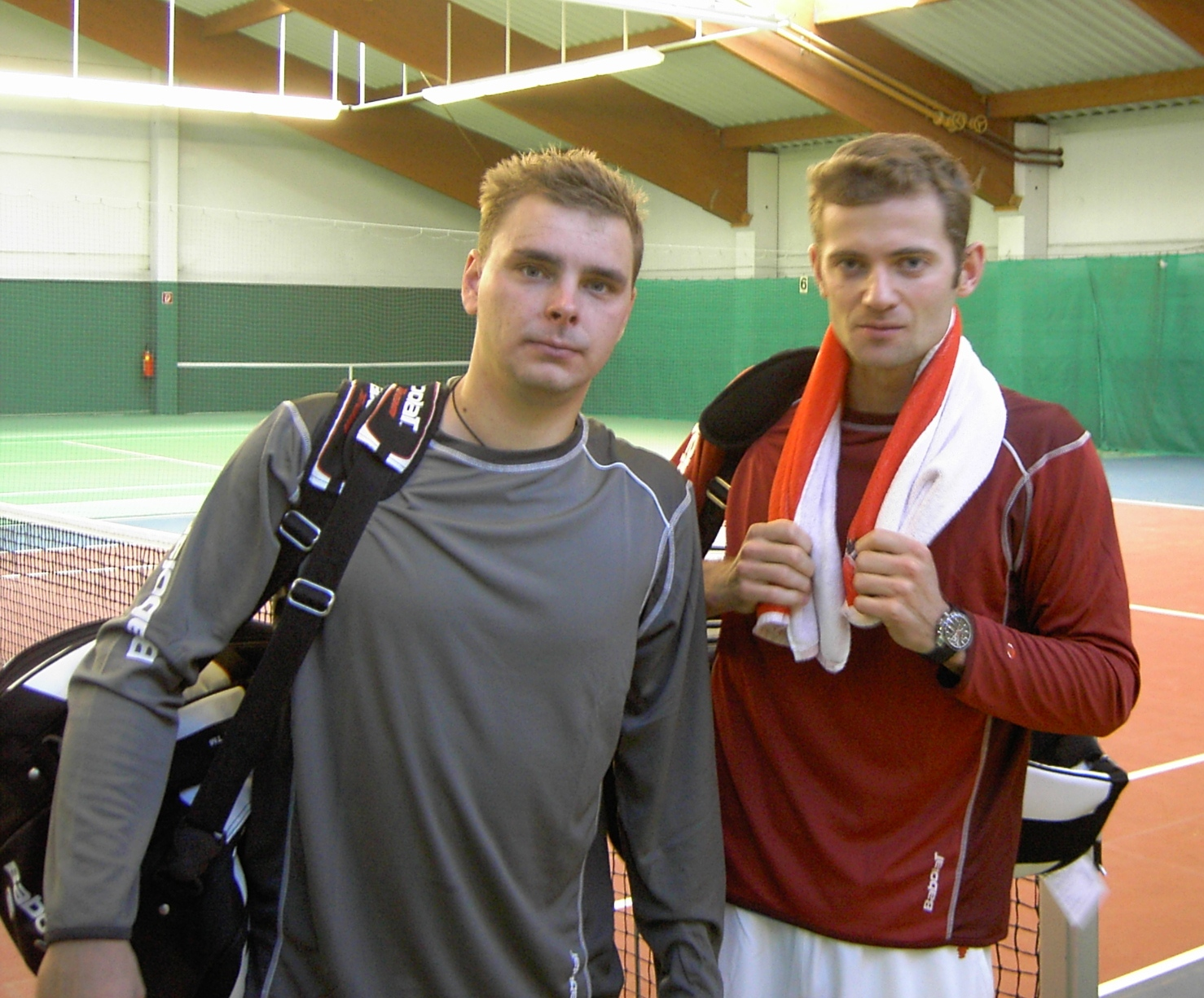
Polish team of Marcin Matkowski and Mariusz Fyrstenberg won the doubles thrice, in 2001, 2003 and 2005

The Invest in Szczecin Open (formerly Pekao Szczecin Open) is a professional tennis tournament played on outdoor clay courts. It is currently part of the ATP Challenger Tour 125. It was part of the Tretorn SERIE+ on the Challenger Tour. It is held annually at the Wojska Polskiego in Szczecin, Poland, since 1993 (as a Satellite from 1993 to 1995, as a Challenger since 1996).

== Past finals ==
=== Key ===
Challenger
Satellite

=== Singles ===
Year	Champion	Runner-up	Score
2026	(Spain) Nikolás Sánchez Izquierdo	(Brazil) Thiago Monteiro	4–6, 6–3, 7–6^{(8–6)}
2025	(Argentina) Thiago Agustín Tirante	(Spain) Pablo Llamas Ruiz	6–3, 6–2
2024	(Czech Republic) Vít Kopřiva	(Italy) Andrea Pellegrino	7–5, 6–2
2023	(Argentina) Federico Coria	(Czech Republic) Vít Kopřiva	6–1, 7–6^{(7–4)}
2022	(France) Corentin Moutet	(Austria) Dennis Novak	6–2, 6–7^{(5–7)}, 6–4
2021	(Czech Republic) Zdeněk Kolář	(Poland) Kamil Majchrzak	7–6^{(7–4)}, 7–5
2020	Not Held		
2019	(Slovakia) Jozef Kovalík	(Argentina) Guido Andreozzi	6–7^{(5–7)}, 6–2, 6–4
2018	(Argentina) Guido Andreozzi	(Spain) Alejandro Davidovich Fokina	6–4, 4–6, 6–3
2017	(France) Richard Gasquet	(Germany) Florian Mayer	7–6^{(7–3)}, 7–6^{(7–4)}
2016	(Italy) Alessandro Giannessi	(Germany) Dustin Brown	6–2, 6–3
2015	(Germany) Jan-Lennard Struff	(Ukraine) Artem Smirnov	6–4, 6–3
2014	(Germany) Dustin Brown	(Germany) Jan-Lennard Struff	6–4, 6–3
2013	(Ukraine) Oleksandr Nedovyesov	(Spain) Pere Riba	6–2, 7–5
2012	(Romania) Victor Hănescu	(Spain) Iñigo Cervantes Huegun	6–4, 7–5
2011	(Portugal) Rui Machado	(France) Éric Prodon	2–6, 7–5, 6–2
2010	(Uruguay) Pablo Cuevas	(Russia) Igor Andreev	6–1, 6–1
2009	(Russia) Evgeny Korolev	(France) Florent Serra	6–4, 6–3
2008	(France) Florent Serra	(Spain) Albert Montañés	6–4, 6–3
2007	(Argentina) Sergio Roitman	(Czech Republic) Ivo Minář	6–2, 7–5
2006	(Ecuador) Nicolás Lapentti	(Czech Republic) Bohdan Ulihrach	3–6, 6–3, 6–3
2005	(Argentina) Agustín Calleri	(Spain) Alberto Martín	4–6, 6–2, 6–4
2004	(Argentina) Edgardo Massa	(Spain) David Sánchez	6–2, 6–2
2003	(Chile) Nicolás Massú	(Spain) Albert Portas	6–4, 6–3
2002	(Russia) Nikolay Davydenko	(Spain) David Sánchez	6–3, 6–3
2001	(Argentina) Juan Ignacio Chela	(France) Nicolas Coutelot	6–1, 6–3
2000	(Czech Republic) Bohdan Ulihrach	(Spain) Alberto Martín	6–0, 6– 2
1999	(Sweden) Andreas Vinciguerra	(Costa Rica) Juan Antonio Marín	6–2, 6–4
1998	(Morocco) Younes El Aynaoui	(Germany) Jens Knippschild	6–3, 6–4
1997	(Australia) Richard Fromberg	(Ecuador) Nicolás Lapentti	6–7, 6–4, 6–1
1996	(Venezuela) Jimy Szymanski	(Portugal) Nuno Marques	2–6, 6–3, 6–3
1995	(Switzerland) Patrick Mohr	(Argentina) Federico Lusin	2–6, 6–1, 6–2
1994	(Austria) Reinhard Wawra	(Latvia) Armand Strombach	3–6, 6–2, 7–6
1993	(Poland) Bartłomiej Dąbrowski	(Czech Republic) Pavel Vízner	6–7, 6–2, 6–3

=== Doubles ===
Year	Champions	Runners-up	Score
2026	(Czech Republic) Andrew Paulson (Portugal) Tiago Pereira	(Spain) Íñigo Cervantes (Ukraine) Denys Molchanov	6–2, 6–0
2025	(Ukraine) Denys Molchanov (Austria) David Pichler	Ivan Liutarevich (Spain) Bruno Pujol Navarro	3–6, 7–6^{(7–1)}, [10–6]
2024	(Argentina) Guido Andreozzi (France) Théo Arribagé	(United States) Ryan Seggerman (Poland) Szymon Walków	6–2, 6–1
2023	(Czech Republic) Andrew Paulson (Ukraine) Vitaliy Sachko	(Czech Republic) Zdeněk Kolář (Spain) Sergio Martos Gornés	6–1, 7–6^{(8–6)}
2022	(Jamaica) Dustin Brown (Italy) Andrea Vavassori	(Czech Republic) Roman Jebavý (Czech Republic) Adam Pavlásek	6–4, 5–7, [10–8]
2021	(Mexico) Santiago González (Argentina) Andrés Molteni	(Sweden) André Göransson (United States) Nathaniel Lammons	2–6, 6–2, [15–13]
2020	Not Held		
2019	(Argentina) Guido Andreozzi (Argentina) Andrés Molteni	(Netherlands) Matwé Middelkoop (Chile) Hans Podlipnik Castillo	6–4, 6–3
2018	(Poland) Karol Drzewiecki (Slovakia) Filip Polášek	(Argentina) Guido Andreozzi (Argentina) Guillermo Durán	6–3, 6–4
2017	(Netherlands) Wesley Koolhof (New Zealand) Artem Sitak	(Belarus) Aliaksandr Bury (Sweden) Andreas Siljeström	6–1, 7–5
2016	(Germany) Andre Begemann (Belarus) Aliaksandr Bury	(Sweden) Johan Brunström (Sweden) Andreas Siljeström	7–6^{(7–2)}, 6–7^{(7–9)}, [10–4]
2015	(France) Tristan Lamasine (France) Fabrice Martin	(Italy) Federico Gaio (Italy) Alessandro Giannessi	6–3, 7–6^{(7–4)}
2014	(Germany) Dustin Brown (Germany) Jan-Lennard Struff	(Poland) Tomasz Bednarek (Slovakia) Igor Zelenay	6–2, 6–4
2013	(United Kingdom) Ken Skupski (United Kingdom) Neal Skupski	(Italy) Andrea Arnaboldi (Italy) Alessandro Giannessi	6–4, 1–6, [10–7]
2012	(Germany) Andre Begemann (Germany) Martin Emmrich	(Poland) Tomasz Bednarek (Poland) Mateusz Kowalczyk	3–6, 6–1, [10–3]
2011	(Poland) Marcin Gawron (Poland) Andriej Kapaś	(Kazakhstan) Andrey Golubev (Kazakhstan) Yuri Schukin	6–3, 6–4
2010	(Jamaica) Dustin Brown (Netherlands) Rogier Wassen	(Australia) Rameez Junaid (Germany) Philipp Marx	6–4, 7–5
2009	(Poland) Tomasz Bednarek (Poland) Mateusz Kowalczyk	(Ukraine) Oleksandr Dolgopolov Jr. (Ukraine) Artem Smirnov	6–3, 6–4
2008	(Spain) David Marrero (Poland) Dawid Olejniczak	(Poland) Łukasz Kubot (Austria) Oliver Marach	7–6(4), 6–3
2007	(Germany) Tomas Behrend (Germany) Christopher Kas	(Argentina) Juan Pablo Brzezicki (Argentina) Juan Pablo Guzmán	6–0, 5–7, 10–8
2006	(Germany) Tomas Behrend (Germany) Christopher Kas	(Poland) Tomasz Bednarek (Poland) Marcin Matkowski	6–1, 3–6, 10–4
2005	(Poland) Mariusz Fyrstenberg (Poland) Marcin Matkowski	(Argentina) Agustín Calleri (Argentina) Sebastián Prieto	6–2, 6–4
2004	(Argentina) Lucas Arnold Ker (Argentina) Mariano Hood	(Spain) Óscar Hernández (Spain) Alberto Martín	6–0, 6–4
2003	(Poland) Mariusz Fyrstenberg (Poland) Marcin Matkowski	(Czech Republic) David Škoch (Czech Republic) Jaroslav Levinský	6–1, 7–5
2002	(Argentina) José Acasuso (Argentina) Andrés Schneiter	(Czech Republic) Leoš Friedl (Czech Republic) David Škoch	6–4, 7–5
2001	(Poland) Mariusz Fyrstenberg (Poland) Marcin Matkowski	(Spain) Juan Ignacio Carrasco (Spain) Álex López Morón	6–4, 7–6(2)
2000	(Spain) Alberto Martín (Israel) Eyal Ran	(Argentina) Mariano Hood (Argentina) Martín Rodríguez	7–6(2), 6–7(5), 6–2
1999	(North Macedonia) Aleksandar Kitinov (United States) Jack Waite	(Argentina) Guillermo Cañas (Argentina) Martín García	6–1, 5–7, 6–4
1998	(Bulgaria) Orlin Stanoytchev (Czech Republic) Radomír Vašek	(Italy) Massimo Ardinghi (Spain) Álex López Morón	7–6, 3–6, 6–4
1997	(Netherlands) Tom Kempers (Argentina) Daniel Orsanic	(Italy) Cristian Brandi (Italy) Filippo Messori	6–3, 7–5
1996	(Belgium) Tom Vanhoudt (Netherlands) Fernon Wibier	(Portugal) Emanuel Couto (Portugal) Nuno Marques	6–1, 6–1
1995	(Czech Republic) Martin Dvořáček (Czech Republic) Ota Fukárek	(Austria) Roland Burtscher (Switzerland) Patrick Mohr	6–4, 6–4
1994	(Germany) Arnd Caspari (Germany) Jörg Schors	(New Zealand) Alistair Hunt (Switzerland) Filippo Veglio	6–1, 6–3
1993	(Czech Republic) Rene Hanak (Czech Republic) Tomáš Krupa	(Sweden) Robert Eriksson (Germany) Oliver Gross	6–1, 6–0
