= 2022 Open Quimper Bretagne – Singles =

Singles
- 2022 Open Quimper Bretagne

Final
- Champion: (Canada) Vasek Pospisil
- Runner-up: (France) Grégoire Barrère
- Score: 6–4, 3–6, 6–1

Events
Singles	Doubles
← 2021 ·	Open Quimper Bretagne	· 2023 →

Brandon Nakashima was the defending champion but chose not to participate.

Vasek Pospisil won the title after defeating Grégoire Barrère 6–4, 3–6, 6–1 in the final.

== Seeds ==
1. (Switzerland) Henri Laaksonen (first round)
2. (France) Pierre-Hugues Herbert (first round)
3. (Austria) Dennis Novak (semifinals)
4. (France) Gilles Simon (first round)
5. (Canada) Vasek Pospisil (champion)
6. (Portugal) João Sousa (quarterfinals)
7. (Czech Republic) Jiří Lehečka (first round)
8. (Russia) Roman Safiullin (first round)

== Draw ==
=== Key ===
- Q = Qualifier
- WC = Wild card
- LL = Lucky loser
- Alt = Alternate
- SE = Special exempt
- PR = Protected ranking
- ITF = ITF entry
- JE = Junior exempt
- w/o = Walkover
- r = Retired
- d = Defaulted
- SR = Special ranking

=== Finals ===
Semifinals
(France) Grégoire Barrère	6	6
3	(Austria) Dennis Novak	3	2
5	(Canada) Vasek Pospisil	6	6
Q	(Japan) Hiroki Moriya	2	3

Final
(France) Grégoire Barrère	4	6	1
5	(Canada) Vasek Pospisil	6	3	6

=== Top half ===
First round
1	(Switzerland) H Laaksonen	4	3
(Bosnia and Herzegovina) D Džumhur	6	6
WC	(France) L Van Assche	6^{5}	2
Q	(Russia) A Kuznetsov	7^{7}	6
(France) M Janvier	3	1
(France) L Pouille	6	6
(France) G Barrère	6	6
7	(Czech Republic) J Lehečka	2	3
3	(Austria) D Novak	6	2	6
(Belgium) Z Bergs	4	6	4
Q	(France) E Furness	6	6
(Slovakia) F Horanský	2	3
LL	(Italy) A Arnaboldi	3	0^{r}
(France) C Lestienne	6	3
(Italy) F Agamenone	3	3
6	(Portugal) J Sousa	6	6

Second round
(Bosnia and Herzegovina) D Džumhur	6^{5}	2
Q	(Russia) A Kuznetsov	7^{7}	6
(France) L Pouille	4	3
(France) G Barrère	6	6
3	(Austria) D Novak	6	6
Q	(France) E Furness	4	4
(France) C Lestienne	3	6	3
6	(Portugal) J Sousa	6	2	6

Quarterfinals
Q	(Russia) A Kuznetsov	3	3
(France) G Barrère	6	6
3	(Austria) D Novak	6	7^{8}
6	(Portugal) J Sousa	3	6^{6}

Semifinals
(France) G Barrère	6	6
3	(Austria) D Novak	3	2

=== Bottom half ===
First round
5	(Canada) V Pospisil	6	4	6
(France) M Bourgue	3	6	4
(Germany) M Moraing	3	5
(Slovakia) L Lacko	6	7
Q	(Netherlands) T van Rijthoven	7^{7}	6
(France) A Hoang	6^{2}	3
(Poland) K Żuk	7^{7}	4	6
4/WC	(France) G Simon	6^{5}	6	3
8	(Russia) R Safiullin	6^{7}	3
(Belgium) R Bemelmans	7^{9}	6
Q	(Japan) H Moriya	6	6
Q	(Japan) S Mochizuki	4	1
(Switzerland) M-A Hüsler	4	3
WC	(France) J-W Tsonga	6	6
Q	(France) A Müller	6	6
2	(France) P-H Herbert	4	3

Second round
5	(Canada) V Pospisil	6	6
(Slovakia) L Lacko	4	3
Q	(Netherlands) T van Rijthoven	7	6
(Poland) K Żuk	5	4
(Belgium) R Bemelmans	5	1
Q	(Japan) H Moriya	7	6
WC	(France) J-W Tsonga	2	6	4
Q	(France) A Müller	6	4	6

Quarterfinals
5	(Canada) V Pospisil	7^{7}	6
Q	(Netherlands) T van Rijthoven	6^{3}	4
Q	(Japan) H Moriya	6	7
Q	(France) A Müller	2	5

Semifinals
5	(Canada) V Pospisil	6	6
Q	(Japan) H Moriya	2	3
