= 2021 Open Quimper Bretagne – Doubles =

Doubles
- 2021 Open Quimper Bretagne

Final
- Champions: (France) Grégoire Barrère (France) Albano Olivetti
- Runners-up: (United States) James Cerretani (Switzerland) Marc-Andrea Hüsler
- Score: 5–7, 7–6^{(9–7)}, [10–8]

Events
Singles	Doubles
← 2020 ·	Open Quimper Bretagne	· 2021 →

Andrey Golubev and Aleksandr Nedovyesov were the defending champions but chose not to defend their title.

Grégoire Barrère and Albano Olivetti won the title after defeating James Cerretani and Marc-Andrea Hüsler 5–7, 7–6^{(9–7)}, [10–8] in the final.

== Seeds ==
1. (Sweden) André Göransson / (Netherlands) David Pel (first round)
2. (United States) Nathaniel Lammons / (United States) Jackson Withrow (quarterfinals)
3. (Netherlands) Sander Arends / (Czech Republic) Roman Jebavý (first round)
4. (Poland) Karol Drzewiecki / (Poland) Szymon Walków (first round)

== Draw ==
=== Key ===
- Q = Qualifier
- WC = Wild card
- LL = Lucky loser
- Alt = Alternate
- SE = Special exempt
- PR = Protected ranking
- ITF = ITF entry
- JE = Junior exempt
- w/o = Walkover
- r = Retired
- d = Defaulted
- SR = Special ranking

First round
1	(Sweden) A Göransson (Netherlands) D Pel	6	3	[5]
(United States) B Nakashima (United States) H Reese	3	6	[10]
(France) M Bourgue (France) L Pouille	6	4	[10]
WC	(France) J Eysseric (France) E Furness	2	6	[8]
4	(Poland) K Drzewiecki (Poland) S Walków	6^{0}	2
(France) M Guinard (France) A Rinderknech	7^{7}	6
(United States) D Kudla (Sweden) R Lindstedt	7	4	[5]
(United States) J Cerretani (Switzerland) M-A Hüsler	5	6	[10]
(France) S Doumbia (France) F Reboul	6	7^{7}
WC	(France) B Bonzi (France) T Lamasine	3	6^{3}
(Austria) J Rodionov (Czech Republic) L Rosol	4	7^{16}	[12]
3	(Netherlands) S Arends (Czech Republic) R Jebavý	6	6^{14}	[10]
WC	(France) A Cazaux (France) H Gaston	6	2	[6]
(France) G Barrère (France) A Olivetti	4	6	[10]
(Italy) F Gaio (Italy) R Marcora	2	4
2	(United States) N Lammons (United States) J Withrow	6	6

Quarterfinals
(United States) B Nakashima (United States) H Reese	6	6
(France) M Bourgue (France) L Pouille	2	2
(France) M Guinard (France) A Rinderknech	3	3
(United States) J Cerretani (Switzerland) M-A Hüsler	6	6
(France) S Doumbia (France) F Reboul	6	6
(Austria) J Rodionov (Czech Republic) L Rosol	4	3
(France) G Barrère (France) A Olivetti	4	7^{7}	[10]
2	(United States) N Lammons (United States) J Withrow	6	6^{3}	[6]

Semifinals
(United States) B Nakashima (United States) H Reese	2	4
(United States) J Cerretani (Switzerland) M-A Hüsler	6	6
(France) S Doumbia (France) F Reboul	4	2
(France) G Barrère (France) A Olivetti	6	6

Final
(United States) J Cerretani (Switzerland) M-A Hüsler	7	6^{7}	[8]
(France) G Barrère (France) A Olivetti	5	7^{9}	[10]
