= 2021 Open Quimper Bretagne – Singles =

Singles
- 2021 Open Quimper Bretagne

Final
- Champion: (United States) Sebastian Korda
- Runner-up: (Slovakia) Filip Horanský
- Score: 6–1, 6–1

Events
| Singles | Doubles |
| ← 2020 · | Open Quimper Bretagne | · 2021 → |

Cem İlkel was the defending champion but chose to compete in Antalya instead.

Sebastian Korda won the title after defeating Filip Horanský 6–1, 6–1 in the final.

== Seeds ==
1. (France) Lucas Pouille (first round)
2. (United States) Sebastian Korda (champion)
3. (France) Grégoire Barrère (second round)
4. (United States) Denis Kudla (first round)
5. (Italy) Federico Gaio (second round)
6. (Austria) Jurij Rodionov (first round)
7. (Germany) Peter Gojowczyk (first round)
8. (Switzerland) Marc-Andrea Hüsler (first round)

== Draw ==
=== Key ===
- Q = Qualifier
- WC = Wild card
- LL = Lucky loser
- Alt = Alternate
- SE = Special exempt
- PR = Protected ranking
- ITF = ITF entry
- JE = Junior exempt
- w/o = Walkover
- r = Retired
- d = Defaulted
- SR = Special ranking

=== Finals ===
Semifinals
(Slovakia) Filip Horanský | 7^{12} | 4 | 6
(United States) Brandon Nakashima | 6^{10} | 6 | 4
(France) Benjamin Bonzi | 6^{5} | 6^{1}
2 | (United States) Sebastian Korda | 7^{7} | 7^{7}

Final
(Slovakia) Filip Horanský | 1 | 1
2 | (United States) Sebastian Korda | 6 | 6

=== Top half ===
First round
1 | (France) L Pouille | 4 | 7 | 4
(Slovakia) F Horanský | 6 | 5 | 6
(Germany) M Marterer | 5 | 6 | 7^{8}
(Austria) S Ofner | 7 | 4 | 6^{6}
Q | (France) Antoine Cornut-Chauvinc | 5 | 6^{4}
(France) A Rinderknech | 7 | 7^{7}
Q | (Poland) K Żuk | 6 | 6
7 | (Germany) P Gojowczyk | 4 | 3
4 | (United States) D Kudla | 2 | 6^{6}
WC | (France) C Lestienne | 6 | 7^{8}
(Slovakia) L Lacko | 3 | 7^{7} | 6^{4}
(Uzbekistan) D Istomin | 6 | 6^{2} | 7^{7}
(France) M Janvier | 3 | 2
(United States) B Nakashima | 6 | 6
(Latvia) E Gulbis | 4 | 6^{3}
5 | (Italy) F Gaio | 6 | 7^{7}

Second round
(Slovakia) F Horanský | 6^{6} | 7 | 6
(Germany) M Marterer | 7^{8} | 5 | 4
(France) A Rinderknech | 6^{7} | 2
Q | (Poland) K Żuk | 7^{9} | 6
WC | (France) C Lestienne | 6 | 6
(Uzbekistan) D Istomin | 4 | 4
(United States) B Nakashima | 6 | 6
5 | (Italy) F Gaio | 2 | 1

Quarterfinals
(Slovakia) F Horanský | 6 | 7
Q | (Poland) K Żuk | 3 | 5
WC | (France) C Lestienne | 4 | 5
(United States) B Nakashima | 6 | 7

Semifinals
(Slovakia) F Horanský | 7^{12} | 4 | 6
(United States) B Nakashima | 6^{10} | 6 | 4

=== Bottom half ===
First round
8 | (Switzerland) M-A Hüsler | 3 | 7^{7} | 6^{5}
(France) B Bonzi | 6 | 6^{2} | 7^{7}
(Italy) T Fabbiano | 1 | 7 | 1
(Germany) Y Maden | 6 | 5 | 6
WC | (France) A Cazaux | 4 | 5
Q | (Ukraine) I Marchenko | 6 | 7
(France) H Gaston | 3 | 4
3 | (France) G Barrère | 6 | 6
6 | (Austria) J Rodionov | 3 | 6 | 4
(France) E Couacaud | 6 | 1 | 6
WC | (France) E Furness | 6 | 6
(Italy) R Marcora | 2 | 1
(France) M Bourgue | 7^{7} | 6
(Czech Republic) L Rosol | 6^{5} | 4
Q | (France) T Lamasine | 6^{3} | 6 | 6^{7}
2 | (United States) S Korda | 7^{7} | 4 | 7^{9}

Second round
(France) B Bonzi | 4 | 6 | 7^{7}
(Germany) Y Maden | 6 | 2 | 6^{5}
Q | (Ukraine) I Marchenko | 6 | 6
3 | (France) G Barrère | 3 | 2
(France) E Couacaud | 6 | 6^{5} | 6
WC | (France) E Furness | 4 | 7^{7} | 3
(France) M Bourgue | 7 | 6^{2} | 4
2 | (United States) S Korda | 5 | 7^{7} | 6

Quarterfinals
(France) B Bonzi | 6^{7} | 6 | 6
Q | (Ukraine) I Marchenko | 7^{9} | 4 | 4
(France) E Couacaud | 1^{r}
2 | (United States) S Korda | 4

Semifinals
(France) B Bonzi | 6^{5} | 6^{1}
2 | (United States) S Korda | 7^{7} | 7^{7}
