= 2021 Open Quimper Bretagne II =

- Date: 1–7 February
- Edition: 12th
- Surface: Hard (Indoor)
- Location: Quimper, France

Champions

Singles
- (United States) Brandon Nakashima

Doubles
- (Belgium) Ruben Bemelmans / (Germany) Daniel Masur
← 2021 ·	Open Quimper Bretagne	· 2022 →

The 2021 Open Quimper Bretagne Occidentale II was a professional tennis tournament played on hard courts. It was the twelfth edition of the tournament which was part of the 2021 ATP Challenger Tour. It took place in Quimper, France between 1 and 7 February 2021.

== Singles main-draw entrants ==
=== Seeds ===
Country	Player	Rank^{1}	Seed
ESP	Alejandro Davidovich Fokina	54	1
FRA	Lucas Pouille	74	2
~~USA~~	~~Sebastian Korda~~	~~103~~	~~3~~
FRA	Grégoire Barrère	111	4
USA	Denis Kudla	116	5
FRA	Antoine Hoang	119	6
FRA	Arthur Rinderknech	135	7
ITA	Federico Gaio	136	8

- ^{1} Rankings as of 25 January 2021.

=== Other entrants ===
The following players received wildcards into the singles main draw:

- (France) Arthur Cazaux
- (France) Antoine Cornut-Chauvinc
- (France) Manuel Guinard

The following players received entry into the singles main draw as alternates:

- (France) Maxime Janvier
- (Slovakia) Lukáš Lacko

The following players received entry from the qualifying draw:

- (France) Mathias Bourgue
- (France) Evan Furness
- (Germany) Tobias Kamke
- (Italy) Matteo Viola

The following player received entry as a lucky loser:

- (Germany) Daniel Masur

== Champions ==
=== Singles ===
- (United States) Brandon Nakashima def. (Spain) Bernabé Zapata Miralles 6–3, 6–4.

=== Doubles ===
- (Belgium) Ruben Bemelmans / (Germany) Daniel Masur def. (United States) Brandon Nakashima / (United States) Hunter Reese 6–2, 6–1.
