= 2023 Open Quimper Bretagne – Doubles =

Doubles
- 2023 Open Quimper Bretagne

Final
- Champions: (France) Sadio Doumbia (France) Fabien Reboul
- Runners-up: (India) Anirudh Chandrasekar (India) Arjun Kadhe
- Score: 6–2, 6–4

Events
Singles	Doubles
← 2022 ·	Open Quimper Bretagne	· 2024 →

Albano Olivetti and David Vega Hernández were the defending champions but only Olivetti chose to defend his title, partnering Hunter Reese. Olivetti lost in the quarterfinals to Anirudh Chandrasekar and Arjun Kadhe.

Sadio Doumbia and Fabien Reboul won the title after defeating Chandrasekar and Kadhe 6–2, 6–4 in the final.

== Seeds ==
1. (France) Sadio Doumbia / (France) Fabien Reboul (champions)
2. (France) Albano Olivetti / (United States) Hunter Reese (quarterfinals)
3. (France) Jonathan Eysseric / (Ukraine) Denys Molchanov (first round)
4. (United Kingdom) Jonny O'Mara / (Poland) Szymon Walków (quarterfinals)

== Draw ==
=== Key ===
- Q = Qualifier
- WC = Wild card
- LL = Lucky loser
- Alt = Alternate
- ITF = ITF entry
- PR = Protected ranking
- SR = Special ranking
- SE = Special exempt
- JE = Junior exempt
- JR = Junior Accelerator Programme entrant
- CO = College Accelerator Programme entrant
- NG = Next Gen Accelerator Program entrant
- w/o = Walkover
- r = Retired
- d = Defaulted

First round
1	(France) S Doumbia (France) F Reboul	7^{7}	6
(United Kingdom) L Johnson (Netherlands) S Verbeek	6^{5}	4
WC	(France) G Blancaneaux (France) E Furness	6	3	[10]
Alt	(Netherlands) G Brouwer (Argentina) S Rodríguez Taverna	4	6	[7]
4	(United Kingdom) J O'Mara (Poland) S Walków	6^{3}	6	[10]
(Ukraine) V Manafov (Switzerland) L Margaroli	7^{7}	3	[4]
WC	(France) G Barrère (France) M Bourgue	7	2	[5]
(Germany) F Fallert (Germany) H Jebens	5	6	[10]
(Moldova) R Albot (New Zealand) A Sitak	2	7	[12]
(United States) R Stalder (Greece) Pe Tsitsipas	6	5	[10]
(France) H Grenier (France) A Müller	3	7^{7}	[10]
3	(France) J Eysseric (Ukraine) D Molchanov	6	6^{3}	[8]
(Italy) F Cobolli (Italy) L Nardi
(India) A Chandrasekar (India) A Kadhe	w/o
(Romania) VV Cornea (Spain) S Martos Gornés	6	6^{6}	[4]
2	(France) A Olivetti (United States) H Reese	2	7^{8}	[10]

Quarterfinals
1	(France) S Doumbia (France) F Reboul	6	6
WC	(France) G Blancaneaux (France) E Furness	3	4
4	(United Kingdom) J O'Mara (Poland) S Walków	6	4	[8]
(Germany) F Fallert (Germany) H Jebens	3	6	[10]
(Moldova) R Albot (New Zealand) A Sitak	w/o
(France) H Grenier (France) A Müller
(India) A Chandrasekar (India) A Kadhe	6	1	[10]
2	(France) A Olivetti (United States) H Reese	3	6	[7]

Semifinals
1	(France) S Doumbia (France) F Reboul	6	6
(Germany) F Fallert (Germany) H Jebens	1	4
(Moldova) R Albot (New Zealand) A Sitak	1	2
(India) A Chandrasekar (India) A Kadhe	6	6

Final
1	(France) S Doumbia (France) F Reboul	6	6
(India) A Chandrasekar (India) A Kadhe	2	4
