= 2023 Open Quimper Bretagne =

- Date: 24–29 January
- Edition: 14th
- Surface: Hard (indoor)
- Location: Quimper, France

Champions

Singles
- (France) Grégoire Barrère

Doubles
- (France) Sadio Doumbia / (France) Fabien Reboul
← 2022 ·	Open Quimper Bretagne	· 2024 →

The 2023 Open Quimper Bretagne Occidentale was a professional tennis tournament played on hard courts. It was the 14th edition of the tournament which was part of the 2023 ATP Challenger Tour. It took place in Quimper, France between 24 and 29 January 2023.

== Singles main-draw entrants ==
=== Seeds ===
Country	Player	Rank^{1}	Seed
~~FRA~~	~~Quentin Halys~~	~~61~~	~~1~~
FRA	Grégoire Barrère	83	2
CAN	Vasek Pospisil	99	3
MDA	Radu Albot	100	4
SUI	Dominic Stricker	118	5
AUT	Dennis Novak	132	6
ITA	Matteo Arnaldi	134	7
FRA	Luca Van Assche	143	8

- ^{1} Rankings are as of 16 January 2023.

=== Other entrants ===
The following players received wildcards into the singles main draw:

- (France) Arthur Fils
- (France) Pierre-Hugues Herbert
- (France) Lucas Pouille

The following players received entry into the singles main draw as alternates:

- (Austria) Sebastian Ofner
- (Argentina) Santiago Rodríguez Taverna

The following players received entry from the qualifying draw:

- (France) Calvin Hemery
- (Ukraine) Illya Marchenko
- (United States) Nicolas Moreno de Alboran
- (France) Giovanni Mpetshi Perricard
- (France) Johan Tatlot
- (China) Bu Yunchaokete

The following players received entry as lucky losers:

- (France) Evan Furness
- (Dominican Republic) Nick Hardt

== Champions ==
=== Singles ===
- (France) Grégoire Barrère def. (France) Arthur Fils 6–1, 6–4.

=== Doubles ===
- (France) Sadio Doumbia / (France) Fabien Reboul def. (India) Anirudh Chandrasekar / (India) Arjun Kadhe 6–2, 6–4.
