= 2020 Open Quimper Bretagne =

- Date: 27 January – 2 February
- Edition: 10th
- Surface: Hard
- Location: Quimper, France

Champions

Singles
- (Turkey) Cem İlkel

Doubles
- (Kazakhstan) Andrey Golubev / (Kazakhstan) Aleksandr Nedovyesov
← 2019 ·	Open Quimper Bretagne	· 2021 →

The 2020 Open Quimper Bretagne Occidentale was a professional tennis tournament played on hard courts. It was the tenth edition of the tournament which was part of the 2020 ATP Challenger Tour. It took place in Quimper, France between 27 January and 2 February 2020.

== Singles main-draw entrants ==
=== Seeds ===
Country	Player	Rank^{1}	Seed
ESP	Guillermo García López	160	1
SRB	Danilo Petrović	166	2
SVK	Lukáš Lacko	178	3
FRA	Enzo Couacaud	197	4
FRA	Maxime Janvier	201	5
RUS	Alexey Vatutin	207	6
ESP	Bernabé Zapata Miralles	210	7
JPN	Hiroki Moriya	212	8
GER	Matthias Bachinger	213	9
FRA	Tristan Lamasine	214	10
FRA	Quentin Halys	215	11
GER	Mats Moraing	222	12
FRA	Constant Lestienne	225	13
CZE	Zdeněk Kolář	227	14
ESP	Roberto Ortega Olmedo	242	15
FRA	Mathias Bourgue	243	16

- ^{1} Rankings as of 20 January 2020.

=== Other entrants ===
The following players received wildcards into the singles main draw:

- (France) Dan Added
- (France) Evan Furness
- (France) Kyrian Jacquet
- (Poland) Jerzy Janowicz
- (France) Valentin Royer

The following players received entry from the qualifying draw:

- (France) Antoine Escoffier
- (Italy) Lorenzo Musetti

== Champions ==
=== Singles ===
- (Turkey) Cem İlkel def. (France) Maxime Janvier 7–6^{(8–6)}, 7–5.

=== Doubles ===
- (Kazakhstan) Andrey Golubev / (Kazakhstan) Aleksandr Nedovyesov def. (Croatia) Ivan Sabanov / (Croatia) Matej Sabanov 6–4, 6–2.
