= 2022 Open Quimper Bretagne =

- Date: 24–30 January
- Edition: 13th
- Surface: Hard (indoor)
- Location: Quimper, France

Champions

Singles
- (Canada) Vasek Pospisil

Doubles
- (France) Albano Olivetti / (Spain) David Vega Hernández
← 2021 ·	Open Quimper Bretagne	· 2023 →

The 2022 Open de Tennis Quimper Bretagne Occidentale was a professional tennis tournament played on hard courts. It was the thirteenth edition of the tournament which was part of the 2022 ATP Challenger Tour. It took place in Quimper, France between 24 and 30 January 2022.

== Singles main-draw entrants ==
=== Seeds ===
Country	Player	Rank^{1}	Seed
SUI	Henri Laaksonen	91	1
FRA	Pierre-Hugues Herbert	112	2
AUT	Dennis Novak	118	3
FRA	Gilles Simon	123	4
CAN	Vasek Pospisil	138	5
POR	João Sousa	140	6
CZE	Jiří Lehečka	142	7
RUS	Roman Safiullin	149	8

- ^{1} Rankings as of 17 January 2022.

=== Other entrants ===
The following players received wildcards into the singles main draw:

- (France) Gilles Simon
- (France) Jo-Wilfried Tsonga
- (France) Luca Van Assche

The following players received entry from the qualifying draw:

- (France) Evan Furness
- (Russia) Andrey Kuznetsov
- (Japan) Shintaro Mochizuki
- (Japan) Hiroki Moriya
- (France) Alexandre Müller
- (Netherlands) Tim van Rijthoven

The following player received entry as a lucky loser:

- (Italy) Andrea Arnaboldi

== Champions ==
=== Singles ===
- (Canada) Vasek Pospisil def. (France) Grégoire Barrère 6–4, 3–6, 6–1.

=== Doubles ===
- (France) Albano Olivetti / (Spain) David Vega Hernández def. (Netherlands) Sander Arends / (Netherlands) David Pel 3–6, 6–4, [10–8].
