= 2020 Open Quimper Bretagne – Doubles =

Doubles
- 2020 Open Quimper Bretagne

Final
- Champions: (Kazakhstan) Andrey Golubev (Kazakhstan) Aleksandr Nedovyesov
- Runners-up: (Croatia) Ivan Sabanov (Croatia) Matej Sabanov
- Score: 6–4, 6–2

Events
Singles	Doubles
← 2019 ·	Open Quimper Bretagne	· 2021 →

Fabrice Martin and Hugo Nys were the defending champions but chose not to defend their title.

Andrey Golubev and Aleksandr Nedovyesov won the title after defeating Ivan and Matej Sabanov 6–4, 6–2 in the final.

== Seeds ==
1. (Monaco) Romain Arneodo / (Germany) Andre Begemann (first round)
2. (Bosnia and Herzegovina) Tomislav Brkić / (Croatia) Ante Pavić (first round)
3. (India) Purav Raja / (Canada) Adil Shamasdin (semifinals)
4. (United States) Robert Galloway / (Mexico) Hans Hach Verdugo (quarterfinals)

== Draw ==
=== Key ===
- Q = Qualifier
- WC = Wild card
- LL = Lucky loser
- Alt = Alternate
- SE = Special exempt
- PR = Protected ranking
- ITF = ITF entry
- JE = Junior exempt
- w/o = Walkover
- r = Retired
- d = Defaulted
- SR = Special ranking

First round
1	(Monaco) R Arneodo (Germany) A Begemann	3	4
(Kazakhstan) A Golubev (Kazakhstan) A Nedovyesov	6	6
WC	(France) E Couacaud (France) A Olivetti	6	6
(Italy) A Arnaboldi (Italy) A Pellegrino	1	4
4	(United States) R Galloway (Mexico) H Hach Verdugo	4	6	[10]
WC	(France) Quentin Gueydan (France) Mathis Moysan	6	1	[5]
(Russia) T Gabashvili (Germany) M Zverev	1	6^{10}
(United Kingdom) S Clayton (United Kingdom) L Glasspool	6	7^{12}
(Austria) L Miedler (Germany) M Moraing	2	5
(Czech Republic) Z Kolář (Poland) S Walków	6	7
Alt	(Turkey) A Çelikbilek (Turkey) C İlkel	4	7	[9]
3	(India) P Raja (Canada) A Shamasdin	6	5	[11]
(Croatia) I Sabanov (Croatia) M Sabanov	6	6
(Belgium) R Bemelmans (Germany) D Masur	2	4
(Spain) G García López (Spain) R Ortega Olmedo	6	6
2	(Bosnia and Herzegovina) T Brkić (Croatia) A Pavić	4	4

Quarterfinals
(Kazakhstan) A Golubev (Kazakhstan) A Nedovyesov	6	6^{3}	[12]
WC	(France) E Couacaud (France) A Olivetti	4	7^{7}	[10]
4	(United States) R Galloway (Mexico) H Hach Verdugo	7^{7}	1	[9]
(United Kingdom) S Clayton (United Kingdom) L Glasspool	6^{3}	6	[11]
(Czech Republic) Z Kolář (Poland) S Walków	4	5
3	(India) P Raja (Canada) A Shamasdin	6	7
(Croatia) I Sabanov (Croatia) M Sabanov	6	6
(Spain) G García López (Spain) R Ortega Olmedo	1	3

Semifinals
(Kazakhstan) A Golubev (Kazakhstan) A Nedovyesov	6	6
(United Kingdom) S Clayton (United Kingdom) L Glasspool	0	4
3	(India) P Raja (Canada) A Shamasdin	2	3
(Croatia) I Sabanov (Croatia) M Sabanov	6	6

Final
(Kazakhstan) A Golubev (Kazakhstan) A Nedovyesov	6	6
(Croatia) I Sabanov (Croatia) M Sabanov	4	2
