= 2021 Open Quimper Bretagne =

- Date: 25–31 January
- Edition: 11th
- Surface: Hard (Indoor)
- Location: Quimper, France

Champions

Singles
- (United States) Sebastian Korda

Doubles
- (France) Grégoire Barrère / (France) Albano Olivetti
← 2020 ·	Open Quimper Bretagne	· 2021 →

The 2021 Open Quimper Bretagne Occidentale was a professional tennis tournament played on hard courts. It was the eleventh edition of the tournament which was part of the 2021 ATP Challenger Tour. It took place in Quimper, France between 25 and 31 January 2021.

== Singles main-draw entrants ==
=== Seeds ===
Country	Player	Rank^{1}	Seed
FRA	Lucas Pouille	74	1
USA	Sebastian Korda	103	2
FRA	Grégoire Barrère	111	3
USA	Denis Kudla	116	4
ITA	Federico Gaio	136	5
AUT	Jurij Rodionov	144	6
GER	Peter Gojowczyk	147	7
SUI	Marc-Andrea Hüsler	148	8

- ^{1} Rankings as of 18 January 2021.

=== Other entrants ===
The following players received wildcards into the singles main draw:

- (France) Arthur Cazaux
- (France) Evan Furness
- (France) Constant Lestienne

The following players received entry from the qualifying draw:

- (France) Antoine Cornut-Chauvinc
- (France) Tristan Lamasine
- (Ukraine) Illya Marchenko
- (Poland) Kacper Żuk

== Champions ==
=== Singles ===
- (United States) Sebastian Korda def. (Slovakia) Filip Horanský 6–1, 6–1.

=== Doubles ===
- (France) Grégoire Barrère / (France) Albano Olivetti def. (United States) James Cerretani / (Switzerland) Marc-Andrea Hüsler 5–7, 7–6^{(9–7)}, [10–8].
