= 2021 Open Quimper Bretagne II – Doubles =

Doubles
- 2021 Open Quimper Bretagne II

Final
- Champions: (Belgium) Ruben Bemelmans (Germany) Daniel Masur
- Runners-up: (United States) Brandon Nakashima (United States) Hunter Reese
- Score: 6–2, 6–1

Events
Singles	Doubles
← 2021 ·	Open Quimper Bretagne	· 2022 →

Grégoire Barrère and Albano Olivetti were the defending champions but lost in the first round to Ruben Bemelmans and Daniel Masur.

Bemelmans and Masur won the title after defeating Brandon Nakashima and Hunter Reese 6–2, 6–1 in the final.

This event was the second edition of the Open Quimper Bretagne in 2021 after the Open d'Orléans was delayed due to the COVID-19 pandemic in France.

== Seeds ==
1. (United States) Nathaniel Lammons / (United States) Jackson Withrow (first round)
2. (Netherlands) Sander Arends / (Czech Republic) Roman Jebavý (first round)
3. (Poland) Karol Drzewiecki / (Poland) Szymon Walków (quarterfinals)
4. (France) Grégoire Barrère / (France) Albano Olivetti (first round)

== Draw ==
=== Key ===
- Q = Qualifier
- WC = Wild card
- LL = Lucky loser
- Alt = Alternate
- SE = Special exempt
- PR = Protected ranking
- ITF = ITF entry
- JE = Junior exempt
- w/o = Walkover
- r = Retired
- d = Defaulted
- SR = Special ranking

First round
1	(United States) N Lammons (United States) J Withrow	3	4
WC	(France) A Cazaux (France) H Gaston	6	6
(Spain) S Martos Gornés (Spain) B Zapata Miralles	2	6^{1}
(France) M Guinard (France) A Rinderknech	6	7^{7}
4	(France) G Barrère (France) A Olivetti	7^{8}	2	[7]
(Belgium) R Bemelmans (Germany) D Masur	6^{6}	6	[10]
(United States) J Cerretani (Canada) A Shamasdin	6	6
WC	(France) J Eysseric (France) A Hoang	4	4
(United States) B Nakashima (United States) H Reese	6	6
(United States) D Kudla (Sweden) R Lindstedt	3	3
WC	(Uzbekistan) D Istomin (Russia) E Karlovskiy	6^{8}	5
3	(Poland) K Drzewiecki (Poland) S Walków	7^{10}	7
(Austria) J Rodionov (Czech Republic) L Rosol	6	6^{5}	[10]
(Austria) S Ofner (Poland) J Zieliński	4	7^{7}	[7]
(Germany) J Lenz (Germany) Y Maden	4	6	[10]
2	(Netherlands) S Arends (Czech Republic) R Jebavý	6	3	[7]

Quarterfinals
WC	(France) A Cazaux (France) H Gaston	5	1^{r}
(France) M Guinard (France) A Rinderknech	7	0
(Belgium) R Bemelmans (Germany) D Masur	6	6
(United States) J Cerretani (Canada) A Shamasdin	3	2
(United States) B Nakashima (United States) H Reese	3	7^{9}	[10]
3	(Poland) K Drzewiecki (Poland) S Walków	6	6^{7}	[7]
(Austria) J Rodionov (Czech Republic) L Rosol	3	4
(Germany) J Lenz (Germany) Y Maden	6	6

Semifinals
(France) M Guinard (France) A Rinderknech	5	4
(Belgium) R Bemelmans (Germany) D Masur	7	6
(United States) B Nakashima (United States) H Reese	5	6	[12]
(Germany) J Lenz (Germany) Y Maden	7	4	[10]

Final
(Belgium) R Bemelmans (Germany) D Masur	6	6
(United States) B Nakashima (United States) H Reese	2	1
