= 2020 Open Quimper Bretagne – Singles =

Singles
- 2020 Open Quimper Bretagne

Final
- Champion: (Turkey) Cem İlkel
- Runner-up: (France) Maxime Janvier
- Score: 7–6^{(8–6)}, 7–5

Events
Singles	Doubles
← 2019 ·	Open Quimper Bretagne	· 2021 →

Grégoire Barrère was the defending champion but chose not to defend his title.

Cem İlkel won the title after defeating Maxime Janvier 7–6^{(8–6)}, 7–5 in the final.

== Seeds ==
All seeds receive a bye into the second round.

1. (Spain) Guillermo García López (third round)
2. (Serbia) Danilo Petrović (second round, retired)
3. (Slovakia) Lukáš Lacko (semifinals)
4. (France) Enzo Couacaud (third round)
5. (France) Maxime Janvier (final)
6. (Russia) Alexey Vatutin (third round)
7. (Spain) Bernabé Zapata Miralles (third round)
8. (Japan) Hiroki Moriya (second round)
9. (Germany) Matthias Bachinger (quarterfinals)
10. (France) Tristan Lamasine (second round)
11. (France) Quentin Halys (third round)
12. (Germany) Mats Moraing (second round)
13. (France) Constant Lestienne (third round)
14. (Czech Republic) Zdeněk Kolář (quarterfinals)
15. (Spain) Roberto Ortega Olmedo (third round)
16. (France) Mathias Bourgue (semifinals)

== Draw ==
=== Key ===
- Q = Qualifier
- WC = Wild card
- LL = Lucky loser
- Alt = Alternate
- SE = Special exempt
- PR = Protected ranking
- ITF = ITF entry
- JE = Junior exempt
- w/o = Walkover
- r = Retired
- d = Defaulted
- SR = Special ranking

=== Finals ===
Quarterfinals
14	(Czech Republic) Zdeněk Kolář	4	6	3
5	(France) Maxime Janvier	6	1	6
16	(France) Mathias Bourgue	6	6
9	(Germany) Matthias Bachinger	4	4
(Germany) Mischa Zverev	7^{7}	2	4
3	(Slovakia) Lukáš Lacko	6^{3}	6	6
(Czech Republic) Vít Kopřiva	2	7^{7}	1
(Turkey) Cem İlkel	6	6^{1}	6

Semifinals
5	(France) Maxime Janvier	6	5	6
16	(France) Mathias Bourgue	4	7	4
3	(Slovakia) Lukáš Lacko	3	7^{9}	6^{5}
(Turkey) Cem İlkel	6	6^{7}	7^{7}

Final
5	(France) Maxime Janvier	6^{6}	5
(Turkey) Cem İlkel	7^{8}	7

=== Top half ===
==== Section 1 ====
First round
(Germany) T Kamke	7^{7}	6
WC	(France) V Royer	6^{4}	2
(Belgium) R Bemelmans	6^{6}	6^{3}
(France) M Guinard	7^{8}	7^{7}
(Germany) D Masur	6	3	6
(Austria) L Miedler	4	6	3
(Italy) A Pellegrino	6^{5}	3
(Slovakia) L Klein	7^{7}	6

Second round
1	(Spain) G García López	1	6	6
(Germany) T Kamke	6	3	4
(France) M Guinard	5	6	0
14	(Czech Republic) Z Kolář	7	2	6
12	(Germany) M Moraing	6	4	6^{4}
(Germany) D Masur	3	6	7^{7}
(Slovakia) L Klein	3	6^{3}
5	(France) M Janvier	6	7^{7}

Third round
1	(Spain) G García López	4	3
14	(Czech Republic) Z Kolář	6	6
(Germany) D Masur	4	3
5	(France) M Janvier	6	6

Quarterfinals
14	(Czech Republic) Z Kolář	4	6	3
5	(France) M Janvier	6	1	6

==== Section 2 ====
First round
(France) A Rinderknech	7^{7}	7^{7}
Q	(France) A Escoffier	6^{4}	6^{5}
(Czech Republic) T Macháč	7^{12}	6
(Belarus) U Ignatik	6^{10}	2
Q	(Italy) L Musetti	3	6^{6}
(Russia) T Gabashvili	6	7^{8}
(Croatia) N Serdarušić	6	6^{6}	6
(Sweden) M Eriksson	1	7^{8}	4

Second round
4	(France) E Couacaud	4	5
(France) A Rinderknech	6	2^{r}
(Czech Republic) T Macháč	6^{3}	4
16	(France) M Bourgue	7^{7}	6
9	(Germany) M Bachinger	7^{7}	5	6
(Russia) T Gabashvili	6^{4}	7	4
(Croatia) N Serdarušić	6^{4}	3
7	(Spain) B Zapata Miralles	7^{7}	6

Third round
4	(France) E Couacaud	1	6	4
16	(France) M Bourgue	6	4	6
9	(Germany) M Bachinger	6	7
7	(Spain) B Zapata Miralles	4	5

Quarterfinals
16	(France) M Bourgue	6	6
9	(Germany) M Bachinger	4	4

=== Bottom half ===
==== Section 3 ====
First round
(Italy) R Brancaccio	1	6	3
(Germany) M Zverev	6	4	6
WC	(Poland) J Janowicz	6	6
WC	(France) E Furness	3	4
WC	(France) D Added	4	6	6^{4}
(Italy) L Vanni	6	3	7^{7}
(Italy) A Arnaboldi	6	6
(Slovakia) A Molčan	1	4

Second round
8	(Japan) H Moriya	2	6^{5}
(Germany) M Zverev	6	7^{7}
WC	(Poland) J Janowicz
11	(France) Q Halys	w/o
15	(Spain) R Ortega Olmedo	7^{7}	6
(Italy) L Vanni	6^{4}	1
(Italy) A Arnaboldi	6^{11}	6	3
3	(Slovakia) L Lacko	7^{13}	4	6

Third round
(Germany) M Zverev	6	6
11	(France) Q Halys	4	0
15	(Spain) R Ortega Olmedo	2	2
3	(Slovakia) L Lacko	6	6

Quarterfinals
(Germany) M Zverev	7^{7}	2	4
3	(Slovakia) L Lacko	6^{3}	6	6

==== Section 4 ====
First round
WC	(France) K Jacquet	7^{7}	3	6
(Bosnia and Herzegovina) M Bašić	6^{4}	6	3
(Serbia) P Krstin	3	3
(Czech Republic) V Kopřiva	6	6
(Russia) P Kotov	5	1
(Turkey) A Çelikbilek	7	6
(Norway) V Durasovic	6	4	4
(Turkey) C İlkel	4	6	6

Second round
6	(Russia) A Vatutin	6^{6}	6	1
WC	(France) K Jacquet	7^{8}	2	0^{r}
(Czech Republic) V Kopřiva	6	7^{8}
10	(France) T Lamasine	4	6^{6}
13	(France) C Lestienne	6	6
(Turkey) A Çelikbilek	4	4
(Turkey) C İlkel	7^{8}	3
2	(Serbia) D Petrović	6^{6}	1^{r}

Third round
6	(Russia) A Vatutin	6^{2}	6^{4}
(Czech Republic) V Kopřiva	7^{7}	7^{7}
13	(France) C Lestienne	6	5	3
(Turkey) C İlkel	4	7	6

Quarterfinals
(Czech Republic) V Kopřiva	2	7^{7}	1
(Turkey) C İlkel	6	6^{1}	6
