= 2021 French Open – Men's singles qualifying =

Men's singles qualifying
- 2021 French Open

Events
| Singles | men | women | | boys | girls |
| Doubles | men | women | mixed | boys | girls |
| WC Singles | men | women | quad |
| WC Doubles | men | women | quad |
| Legends | −45 | 45+ | women |

Qualification
| Singles | men | women |
| ← 2020 · | French Open | · 2022 → |

The 2021 French Open – Men's Singles Qualifying is a series of tennis matches that takes place from 24 May to 28 May 2021 to determine the sixteen qualifiers into the main draw of the 2021 French Open – Men's singles, and, if necessary, the lucky losers.

== Seeds ==
1. (Belarus) Ilya Ivashka (first round)
2. (Colombia) Daniel Elahi Galán (qualified)
3. (Austria) Dennis Novak (first round)
4. (Portugal) Pedro Sousa (first round, retired)
5. (Japan) Taro Daniel (qualified)
6. (Japan) Yasutaka Uchiyama (moved to main draw)
7. (Spain) Carlos Alcaraz (qualified)
8. (Argentina) Francisco Cerúndolo (qualifying competition, lucky loser)
9. (United States) Mackenzie McDonald (qualified)
10. (United States) Denis Kudla (second round)
11. (Bosnia and Herzegovina) Damir Džumhur (first round)
12. (Bolivia) Hugo Dellien (qualifying competition)
13. (Brazil) Thiago Seyboth Wild (first round)
14. (Spain) Bernabé Zapata Miralles (qualified)
15. (Slovakia) Jozef Kovalík (qualifying competition)
16. (Peru) Juan Pablo Varillas (second round)
17. (Netherlands) Tallon Griekspoor (second round)
18. (France) Antoine Hoang (first round)
19. (Germany) Peter Gojowczyk (qualifying competition, lucky loser)
20. (Germany) Cedrik-Marcel Stebe (first round)
21. (Russia) Evgeny Donskoy (second round)
22. (Spain) Carlos Taberner (qualified)
23. (Italy) Federico Gaio (first round)
24. (United States) Brandon Nakashima (first round)
25. (Serbia) Nikola Milojević (second round)
26. (Austria) Jurij Rodionov (first round)
27. (India) Sumit Nagal (second round)
28. (Czech Republic) Tomáš Macháč (first round)
29. (United Kingdom) Liam Broady (second round)
30. (Argentina) Juan Manuel Cerúndolo (qualifying competition)
31. (Australia) Marc Polmans (qualifying competition)
32. (India) Prajnesh Gunneswaran (first round)

== Qualifiers ==
1. (Netherlands) Botic van de Zandschulp
2. (Colombia) Daniel Elahi Galán
3. (Spain) Mario Vilella Martínez
4. (Germany) Maximilian Marterer
5. (Japan) Taro Daniel
6. (Spain) Carlos Taberner
7. (Spain) Carlos Alcaraz
8. (Italy) Alessandro Giannessi
9. (United States) Mackenzie McDonald
10. (United States) Jenson Brooksby
11. (Uzbekistan) Denis Istomin
12. (Germany) Oscar Otte
13. (United States) Bjorn Fratangelo
14. (Spain) Bernabé Zapata Miralles
15. (Russia) Roman Safiullin
16. (Switzerland) Henri Laaksonen

== Lucky losers ==
1. (Argentina) Francisco Cerúndolo
2. (Germany) Peter Gojowczyk

== Draw ==
=== First qualifier ===
First round
1 | (Belarus) Ilya Ivashka | 4 | 6^{1}
PR | (Russia) Andrey Kuznetsov | 6 | 7^{7}
(Canada) Brayden Schnur | 7^{7} | 5 | 4
(Ukraine) Illya Marchenko | 6^{5} | 7 | 6
(Netherlands) Botic van de Zandschulp | 2 | 7^{7} | 6
(Argentina) Leonardo Mayer | 6 | 6^{4} | 3
WC | (France) Manuel Guinard | 6 | 6
28 | (Czech Republic) Tomáš Macháč | 3 | 3

Second round
PR | (Russia) Andrey Kuznetsov | 6 | 4 | 3
(Ukraine) Illya Marchenko | 3 | 6 | 6
(Netherlands) Botic van de Zandschulp | 6 | 6
WC | (France) Manuel Guinard | 3 | 2

Qualifying competition
(Ukraine) Illya Marchenko | 1 | 2
(Netherlands) Botic van de Zandschulp | 6 | 6

=== Second qualifier ===
First round
2 | (Colombia) Daniel Elahi Galán | 6 | 6
(Latvia) Ernests Gulbis | 3 | 1
(Japan) Tatsuma Ito | 3 | 6 | 5
(Turkey) Altuğ Çelikbilek | 6 | 4 | 7
(Germany) Matthias Bachinger | 4 | 2
(Argentina) Tomás Martín Etcheverry | 6 | 6
(Belgium) Kimmer Coppejans | 6^{1} | 7 | 7
24 | (United States) Brandon Nakashima | 7^{7} | 5 | 5

Second round
2 | (Colombia) Daniel Elahi Galán | 6 | 6
(Turkey) Altuğ Çelikbilek | 3 | 2
(Argentina) Tomás Martín Etcheverry | 7^{9} | 2 | 3
(Belgium) Kimmer Coppejans | 6^{7} | 6 | 6

Qualifying competition
2 | (Colombia) Daniel Elahi Galán | 5 | 7^{7} | 6
(Belgium) Kimmer Coppejans | 7 | 6^{4} | 4

=== Third qualifier ===
First round
3 | (Austria) Dennis Novak | 6 | 2 | 2
(Spain) Mario Vilella Martínez | 1 | 6 | 6
(United Kingdom) Jay Clarke | 3 | 6 | 3
(Slovakia) Filip Horanský | 6 | 4 | 6
(Italy) Lorenzo Giustino | 7 | 5 | 2
(China) Zhang Zhizhen | 5 | 7 | 6
(France) Alexandre Müller | 6 | 0 | 4
19 | (Germany) Peter Gojowczyk | 1 | 6 | 6

Second round
(Spain) Mario Vilella Martínez | 6 | 6
(Slovakia) Filip Horanský | 2 | 3
(China) Zhang Zhizhen | 0 | 6^{2}
19 | (Germany) Peter Gojowczyk | 6 | 7^{7}

Qualifying competition
(Spain) Mario Vilella Martínez | 4 | 6 | 6
19 | (Germany) Peter Gojowczyk | 6 | 3 | 2

=== Fourth qualifier ===
First round
4 | (Portugal) Pedro Sousa | 6 | 6^{6} | 1^{r}
(Croatia) Borna Gojo | 4 | 7^{8} | 1
(Czech Republic) Lukáš Rosol | 4 | 6 | 0
(Brazil) Felipe Meligeni Alves | 6 | 2 | 6
(Germany) Maximilian Marterer | 2 | 6 | 6
WC | (France) Giovanni Mpetshi Perricard | 6 | 3 | 4
(Canada) Peter Polansky | 6^{4} | 6 | 2
25 | (Serbia) Nikola Milojević | 7^{7} | 1 | 6

Second round
(Croatia) Borna Gojo | 3 | 7^{7} | 6^{3}
(Brazil) Felipe Meligeni Alves | 6 | 6^{4} | 7^{7}
(Germany) Maximilian Marterer | 6 | 6
25 | (Serbia) Nikola Milojević | 1 | 1

Qualifying competition
(Brazil) Felipe Meligeni Alves | 2 | 1
(Germany) Maximilian Marterer | 6 | 6

=== Fifth qualifier ===
First round
5 | (Japan) Taro Daniel | 6 | 6
(Italy) Paolo Lorenzi | 3 | 4
(Portugal) João Domingues | 5 | 4
(Ukraine) Sergiy Stakhovsky | 7 | 6
(Spain) Tommy Robredo | 6^{9} | 4
(France) Quentin Halys | 7^{11} | 6
(Germany) Yannick Maden | 6 | 6
23 | (Italy) Federico Gaio | 4 | 4

Second round
5 | (Japan) Taro Daniel | 6 | 6
(Ukraine) Sergiy Stakhovsky | 1 | 4
(France) Quentin Halys | 6 | 6^{3} | 6
(Germany) Yannick Maden | 1 | 7^{7} | 1

Qualifying competition
5 | (Japan) Taro Daniel | 7^{9} | 6
(France) Quentin Halys | 6^{7} | 1

=== Sixth qualifier ===
First round
Alt | (Morocco) Elliot Benchetrit | 3 | 1
(Canada) Steven Diez | 6 | 6
(Brazil) João Menezes | 6 | 6
(Sweden) Elias Ymer | 3 | 4
(United States) Christopher Eubanks | 4 | 5
(Italy) Thomas Fabbiano | 6 | 7
(Slovakia) Martin Kližan | 1 | 2
22 | (Spain) Carlos Taberner | 6 | 6

Second round
(Canada) Steven Diez | 3 | 0
(Brazil) João Menezes | 6 | 6
(Italy) Thomas Fabbiano | 2 | 0
22 | (Spain) Carlos Taberner | 6 | 6

Qualifying competition
(Brazil) João Menezes | 1 | 0
22 | (Spain) Carlos Taberner | 6 | 6

=== Seventh qualifier ===
First round
7 | (Spain) Carlos Alcaraz | 6 | 6
(Slovakia) Lukáš Lacko | 3 | 3
(Czech Republic) Zdeněk Kolář | 3 | 4
(Italy) Andrea Pellegrino | 6 | 6
(Chile) Alejandro Tabilo | 4 | 6 | 6
(Australia) Matthew Ebden | 6 | 3 | 4
(Italy) Roberto Marcora | 3 | 3
27 | (India) Sumit Nagal | 6 | 6

Second round
7 | (Spain) Carlos Alcaraz | 6 | 6
(Italy) Andrea Pellegrino | 1 | 2
(Chile) Alejandro Tabilo | 6 | 6
27 | (India) Sumit Nagal | 3 | 3

Qualifying competition
7 | (Spain) Carlos Alcaraz | 6 | 6
(Chile) Alejandro Tabilo | 1 | 1

=== Eighth qualifier ===
First round
8 | (Argentina) Francisco Cerúndolo | 6 | 7^{7}
(Dominican Republic) Roberto Cid Subervi | 2 | 6^{2}
(France) Constant Lestienne | 2 | 2
(United States) Thai-Son Kwiatkowski | 6 | 6
(Belgium) Ruben Bemelmans | 4 | 7^{7} | 5
(Italy) Alessandro Giannessi | 6 | 6^{5} | 7
(Germany) Daniel Masur | 2 | 7 | 4
17 | (Netherlands) Tallon Griekspoor | 6 | 5 | 6

Second round
8 | (Argentina) Francisco Cerúndolo | 6^{3} | 6 | 7^{7}
(United States) Thai-Son Kwiatkowski | 7^{7} | 4 | 6^{5}
(Italy) Alessandro Giannessi | 7 | 7
17 | (Netherlands) Tallon Griekspoor | 5 | 5

Qualifying competition
8 | (Argentina) Francisco Cerúndolo | 4 | 6 | 2
(Italy) Alessandro Giannessi | 6 | 3 | 6

=== Ninth qualifier ===
First round
9 | (United States) Mackenzie McDonald | 6 | 6
(Australia) Thanasi Kokkinakis | 4 | 4
(Netherlands) Robin Haase | 7^{7} | 5 | 4
(Argentina) Renzo Olivo | 6^{4} | 7 | 6
(Argentina) Marco Trungelliti | 6 | 3 | 6
(Argentina) Sebastián Báez | 2 | 6 | 4
(France) Maxime Janvier | 0 | 4
21 | (Russia) Evgeny Donskoy | 6 | 6

Second round
9 | (United States) Mackenzie McDonald | 6 | 6
(Argentina) Renzo Olivo | 3 | 4
(Argentina) Marco Trungelliti | 6^{8} | 6 | 6
21 | (Russia) Evgeny Donskoy | 7^{10} | 2 | 3

Qualifying competition
9 | (United States) Mackenzie McDonald | 6 | 6
(Argentina) Marco Trungelliti | 4 | 4

=== Tenth qualifier ===
First round
10 | (United States) Denis Kudla | 6 | 6
(Denmark) Mikael Torpegaard | 1 | 2
WC | (France) Timo Legout | 2 | 1
WC | (France) Evan Furness | 6 | 6
(Switzerland) Marc-Andrea Hüsler | 6 | 3 | 6
(Ecuador) Emilio Gómez | 4 | 6 | 2
(United States) Jenson Brooksby | 6 | 6
20 | (Germany) Cedrik-Marcel Stebe | 1 | 0

Second round
10 | (United States) Denis Kudla | 7 | 6^{2} | 4
WC | (France) Evan Furness | 5 | 7^{7} | 6
(Switzerland) Marc-Andrea Hüsler | 7^{7} | 4 | 4
(United States) Jenson Brooksby | 6^{5} | 6 | 6

Qualifying competition
WC | (France) Evan Furness | 7^{7} | 6^{2} | 4
(United States) Jenson Brooksby | 6^{5} | 7^{7} | 6

=== Eleventh qualifier ===
First round
11 | (Bosnia and Herzegovina) Damir Džumhur | 6 | 2 | 1
(Uzbekistan) Denis Istomin | 2 | 6 | 6
(India) Ramkumar Ramanathan | 2 | 7^{7} | 6
(United States) Michael Mmoh | 6 | 6^{4} | 3
(Romania) Marius Copil | 6 | 3 | 6^{5}
(Chile) Marcelo Tomás Barrios Vera | 4 | 6 | 7^{7}
(Germany) Tobias Kamke | 6 | 6
26 | (Austria) Jurij Rodionov | 4 | 0

Second round
(Uzbekistan) Denis Istomin | 6 | 6
(India) Ramkumar Ramanathan | 1 | 2
(Chile) Marcelo Tomás Barrios Vera | 4 | 2
(Germany) Tobias Kamke | 6 | 6

Qualifying competition
(Uzbekistan) Denis Istomin | 6 | 7^{7}
(Germany) Tobias Kamke | 4 | 6^{5}

=== Twelfth qualifier ===
First round
12 | (Bolivia) Hugo Dellien | 3 | 6 | 6
(Bulgaria) Dimitar Kuzmanov | 6 | 2 | 1
(Slovenia) Blaž Kavčič | 6 | 7^{9}
(Poland) Kacper Żuk | 2 | 6^{7}
(United States) Mitchell Krueger | 6 | 3 | 2
(Serbia) Danilo Petrović | 3 | 6 | 6
(Germany) Oscar Otte | 6 | 6
32 | (India) Prajnesh Gunneswaran | 2 | 2

Second round
12 | (Bolivia) Hugo Dellien | 7^{7} | 6^{4} | 6
(Slovenia) Blaž Kavčič | 6^{4} | 7^{7} | 4
(Serbia) Danilo Petrović | 1 | 5
(Germany) Oscar Otte | 6 | 7

Qualifying competition
12 | (Bolivia) Hugo Dellien | 2 | 0
(Germany) Oscar Otte | 6 | 6

=== Thirteenth qualifier ===
First round
13 | (Brazil) Thiago Seyboth Wild | 6 | 6^{6} | 6^{5}
(Serbia) Viktor Troicki | 0 | 7^{8} | 7^{7}
(Australia) Aleksandar Vukic | 6 | 6
(Portugal) Frederico Ferreira Silva | 3 | 1
(United States) Bjorn Fratangelo | 6 | 6
(Japan) Go Soeda | 2 | 3
(Slovenia) Blaž Rola | 6 | 7^{7}
18 | (France) Antoine Hoang | 3 | 6^{3}

Second round
(Serbia) Viktor Troicki | 6 | 2 | 4
(Australia) Aleksandar Vukic | 3 | 6 | 6
(United States) Bjorn Fratangelo | 6^{6} | 6 | 6
(Slovenia) Blaž Rola | 7^{8} | 3 | 1

Qualifying competition
(Australia) Aleksandar Vukic | 2 | 6^{3}
(United States) Bjorn Fratangelo | 6 | 7^{7}

=== Fourteenth qualifier ===
First round
14 | (Spain) Bernabé Zapata Miralles | 4 | 6 | 6
WC | (France) Kyrian Jacquet | 6 | 1 | 4
WC | (France) Matteo Martineau | 6^{3} | 6 | 4
(Kazakhstan) Dmitry Popko | 7^{7} | 4 | 6
WC | (France) Arthur Fils | 6^{5} | 7^{7} | 6
(Australia) Bernard Tomic | 7^{7} | 6^{1} | 3
(Australia) Alex Bolt | 3 | 6 | 3
31 | (Australia) Marc Polmans | 6 | 3 | 6

Second round
14 | (Spain) Bernabé Zapata Miralles | 7 | 6
(Kazakhstan) Dmitry Popko | 5 | 0
WC | (France) Arthur Fils | 1 | 3
31 | (Australia) Marc Polmans | 6 | 6

Qualifying competition
14 | (Spain) Bernabé Zapata Miralles | 6 | 6
31 | (Australia) Marc Polmans | 4 | 0

=== Fifteenth qualifier ===
First round
15 | (Slovakia) Jozef Kovalík | 7 | 7^{7}
WC | (France) Tristan Lamasine | 5 | 6^{5}
(United States) Maxime Cressy | 6 | 4 | 2
(United States) Ernesto Escobedo | 3 | 6 | 6
(Argentina) Guido Andreozzi | 6 | 4 | 1
(Russia) Roman Safiullin | 4 | 6 | 6
(Chinese Taipei) Jason Jung | 4 | 2
29 | (United Kingdom) Liam Broady | 6 | 6

Second round
15 | (Slovakia) Jozef Kovalík | 6 | 4 | 6
(United States) Ernesto Escobedo | 2 | 6 | 2
(Russia) Roman Safiullin | 6 | 6
29 | (United Kingdom) Liam Broady | 1 | 3

Qualifying competition
15 | (Slovakia) Jozef Kovalík | 1 | 7^{7} | 3
(Russia) Roman Safiullin | 6 | 6^{3} | 6

=== Sixteenth qualifier ===
First round
16 | (Peru) Juan Pablo Varillas | 6^{10} | 7 | 6
(Austria) Sebastian Ofner | 7^{12} | 5 | 3
WC | (France) Luca Van Assche | 5 | 3
(Switzerland) Henri Laaksonen | 7 | 6
(Turkey) Cem İlkel | 4 | 4
(Egypt) Mohamed Safwat | 6 | 6
(Argentina) Andrea Collarini | 4 | 6 | 5
30 | (Argentina) Juan Manuel Cerúndolo | 6 | 0 | 7

Second round
16 | (Peru) Juan Pablo Varillas | 6 | 1 | 5
(Switzerland) Henri Laaksonen | 4 | 6 | 7
(Egypt) Mohamed Safwat | 1 | 2
30 | (Argentina) Juan Manuel Cerúndolo | 6 | 6

Qualifying competition
(Switzerland) Henri Laaksonen | 6^{5} | 6 | 7^{9}
30 | (Argentina) Juan Manuel Cerúndolo | 7^{7} | 3 | 6^{7}
