= 2021 Open Quimper Bretagne II – Singles =

Singles
- 2021 Open Quimper Bretagne II

Final
- Champion: (United States) Brandon Nakashima
- Runner-up: (Spain) Bernabé Zapata Miralles
- Score: 6–3, 6–4

Events
Singles	Doubles
← 2021 ·	Open Quimper Bretagne	· 2022 →

This event was the second edition of the Open Quimper Bretagne in 2021 after the Open d'Orléans was delayed due to the COVID-19 pandemic in France.

Sebastian Korda was the defending champion but withdrew before the tournament started due to injury. Brandon Nakashima won the title after defeating Bernabé Zapata Miralles 6–3, 6–4 in the final.

== Seeds ==
1. (Spain) Alejandro Davidovich Fokina (first round, retired)
2. (France) Lucas Pouille (second round)
3. (United States) Sebastian Korda (withdrew)
4. (France) Grégoire Barrère (first round)
5. (United States) Denis Kudla (first round)
6. (France) Antoine Hoang (first round)
7. (France) Arthur Rinderknech (second round)
8. (Italy) Federico Gaio (quarterfinals)

== Draw ==
=== Key ===
- Q = Qualifier
- WC = Wild card
- LL = Lucky loser
- Alt = Alternate
- SE = Special exempt
- PR = Protected ranking
- ITF = ITF entry
- JE = Junior exempt
- w/o = Walkover
- r = Retired
- d = Defaulted
- SR = Special ranking

=== Finals ===
Semifinals
(United States) Brandon Nakashima	4	7	7
Alt	(Slovakia) Lukáš Lacko	6	5	5
(Germany) Peter Gojowczyk	2	1
(Spain) Bernabé Zapata Miralles	6	6

Final
(United States) Brandon Nakashima	6	6
(Spain) Bernabé Zapata Miralles	3	4

=== Top half ===
First round
1	(Spain) A Davidovich Fokina	6	1^{r}
(Italy) T Fabbiano	3	1
(Austria) S Ofner	2	6^{5}
(Germany) M Marterer	6	7^{7}
(United States) B Nakashima	6	6
WC	(France) Antoine Cornut-Chauvinc	3	3
Q	(France) E Furness	6	6
6	(France) A Hoang	3	4
Q	(France) M Bourgue	2	2
Alt	(Slovakia) L Lacko	6	6
(Czech Republic) L Rosol	1	7	1^{r}
WC	(France) A Cazaux	6	5	4
(Italy) R Marcora	4	5
(Switzerland) M-A Hüsler	6	7
(France) H Gaston	6^{5}	4
8	(Italy) F Gaio	7^{7}	6

Second round
(Italy) T Fabbiano	3	2
(Germany) M Marterer	6	6
(United States) B Nakashima	6^{2}	6	6
Q	(France) E Furness	7^{7}	3	1
Alt	(Slovakia) L Lacko	w/o
WC	(France) A Cazaux
(Switzerland) M-A Hüsler	4	6	6^{6}
8	(Italy) F Gaio	6	3	7^{8}

Quarterfinals
(Germany) M Marterer	7^{7}	2	4
(United States) B Nakashima	6^{1}	6	6
Alt	(Slovakia) L Lacko	6	7
8	(Italy) F Gaio	3	5

Semifinals
(United States) B Nakashima	4	7	7
Alt	(Slovakia) L Lacko	6	5	5

=== Bottom half ===
First round
7	(France) A Rinderknech	6	1	6
(Austria) J Rodionov	4	6	1
(Germany) P Gojowczyk	6	4
(Slovakia) F Horanský	2	0^{r}
Q	(Italy) M Viola	5	2
Alt	(France) M Janvier	7	6
LL	(Germany) D Masur	6	7
4	(France) G Barrère	4	5
5	(United States) D Kudla	2	3
(Spain) B Zapata Miralles	6	6
WC	(France) M Guinard	3	3
(France) B Bonzi	6	6
Q	(Germany) T Kamke	5	6	6
(Uzbekistan) D Istomin	7	4	4
(Germany) Y Maden	5	6	2
2	(France) L Pouille	7	4	6

Second round
7	(France) A Rinderknech	5	7^{7}	3
(Germany) P Gojowczyk	7	6^{2}	6
Alt	(France) M Janvier	7^{8}	6
LL	(Germany) D Masur	6^{6}	2
(Spain) B Zapata Miralles	3	7	6
(France) B Bonzi	6	5	3
Q	(Germany) T Kamke	6	6^{3}	6
2	(France) L Pouille	2	7^{7}	2

Quarterfinals
(Germany) P Gojowczyk	6	6
Alt	(France) M Janvier	4	2
(Spain) B Zapata Miralles	6	6
Q	(Germany) T Kamke	2	2

Semifinals
(Germany) P Gojowczyk	2	1
(Spain) B Zapata Miralles	6	6
