= 2023 Open Quimper Bretagne – Singles =

Singles
- 2023 Open Quimper Bretagne

Final
- Champion: (France) Grégoire Barrère
- Runner-up: (France) Arthur Fils
- Score: 6–1, 6–4

Events
Singles	Doubles
- Open Quimper Bretagne

Vasek Pospisil was the defending champion but lost in the first round to Gijs Brouwer.

Grégoire Barrère won the title after defeating Arthur Fils 6–1, 6–4 in the final.

== Seeds ==
1. (France) Quentin Halys (withdrew)
2. (France) Grégoire Barrère (champion)
3. (Canada) Vasek Pospisil (first round)
4. (Moldova) Radu Albot (quarterfinals)
5. (Switzerland) Dominic Stricker (quarterfinals, retired)
6. (Austria) Dennis Novak (second round)
7. (Italy) Matteo Arnaldi (first round)
8. (France) Luca Van Assche (second round)

== Draw ==
Key

- Q = Qualifier
- WC = Wild card
- LL = Lucky loser
- Alt = Alternate
- ITF = ITF entry
- PR = Protected ranking
- SR = Special ranking
- SE = Special exempt
- JE = Junior exempt
- JR = Junior Accelerator Programme entrant
- CO = College Accelerator Programme entrant
- NG = Next Gen Accelerator Program entrant
- w/o = Walkover
- r = Retired
- d = Defaulted

=== Finals ===
Semifinals
Q	(France) Calvin Hemery	5	2
WC	(France) Arthur Fils	7	6
(France) Geoffrey Blancaneaux	4	3
2	(France) Grégoire Barrère	6	6

Final
WC	(France) Arthur Fils	1	4
2	(France) Grégoire Barrère	6	6

=== Top half ===
First round
LL	(France) E Furness	3	6	6
Q	(France) J Tatlot	6	4	3
Q	(France) C Hemery	6	5	7
(France) H Grenier	4	7	5
(France) B Paire	1	4
Q	(Ukraine) I Marchenko	6	6
WC	(France) P-H Herbert	2	3
5	(Switzerland) D Stricker	6	6
3	(Canada) V Pospisil	6	3	3
(Netherlands) G Brouwer	3	6	6
Q	(China) Y Bu	3	2
WC	(France) A Fils	6	6
(Finland) O Virtanen	6	6
Q	(France) G Mpetshi Perricard	4	2
Alt	(Austria) S Ofner	3	6	6
7	(Italy) M Arnaldi	6	2	1

Second round
LL	(France) E Furness	3	4
Q	(France) C Hemery	6	6
Q	(Ukraine) I Marchenko	6	3	3
5	(Switzerland) D Stricker	2	6	6
(Netherlands) G Brouwer	6	4	2
WC	(France) A Fils	4	6	6
(Finland) O Virtanen	5
Alt	(Austria) S Ofner	2^{r}

Quarterfinals
Q	(France) C Hemery	6	2
5	(Switzerland) D Stricker	3	0^{r}
WC	(France) A Fils	4	6	6
(Finland) O Virtanen	6	2	3

Semifinals
Q	(France) C Hemery	5	2
WC	(France) A Fils	7	6

=== Bottom half ===
First round
8	(France) L Van Assche	6	6
(Italy) L Nardi	4	3
Alt	(Argentina) S Rodríguez Taverna	1	6	6^{5}
(France) G Blancaneaux	6	3	7^{7}
(Switzerland) A Bellier	7^{8}	7^{7}
(Hungary) Z Piros	6^{6}	6^{1}
(France) A Müller	4	2
4	(Moldova) R Albot	6	6
6	(Austria) D Novak	6	6
LL	(Dominican Republic) N Hardt	1	2
WC	(France) L Pouille	6	6
(Italy) F Cobolli	3	4
Q	(United States) N Moreno de Alboran	7	6
(France) M Guinard	5	2
(United States) Em Nava	7^{7}	2	6^{5}
2	(France) G Barrère	6^{5}	6	7^{7}

Second round
8	(France) L Van Assche	6	2	0
(France) G Blancaneaux	4	6	6
(Switzerland) A Bellier	6^{4}	3
4	(Moldova) R Albot	7^{7}	6
6	(Austria) D Novak	3	3
WC	(France) L Pouille	6	6
Q	(United States) N Moreno de Alboran	6^{5}	4
2	(France) G Barrère	7^{7}	6

Quarterfinals
(France) G Blancaneaux	6	7^{7}
4	(Moldova) R Albot	4	6^{5}
WC	(France) L Pouille	3	3
2	(France) G Barrère	6	6

Semifinals
(France) G Blancaneaux	4	3
2	(France) G Barrère	6	6
