= 2022 Open Quimper Bretagne – Doubles =

Doubles
- 2022 Open Quimper Bretagne

Final
- Champions: (France) Albano Olivetti (Spain) David Vega Hernández
- Runners-up: (Netherlands) Sander Arends (Netherlands) David Pel
- Score: 3–6, 6–4, [10–8]

Events
Singles	Doubles
- Open Quimper Bretagne

Ruben Bemelmans and Daniel Masur were the reigning champions but only Bemelmans chose to defend his title, partnering Jonathan Eysseric. Bemelmans lost in the first round to Jonáš Forejtek and Michael Vrbenský.

Albano Olivetti and David Vega Hernández won the title after defeating Sander Arends and David Pel 3–6, 6–4, [10–8] in the final.

== Seeds ==
1. (Netherlands) Sander Arends / (Netherlands) David Pel (final)
2. (France) Albano Olivetti / (Spain) David Vega Hernández (champions)
3. (France) Sadio Doumbia / (France) Fabien Reboul (quarterfinals)
4. (Portugal) Francisco Cabral / (Spain) Sergio Martos Gornés (first round)

== Draw ==
Key

- Q = Qualifier
- WC = Wild card
- LL = Lucky loser
- Alt = Alternate
- ITF = ITF entry
- PR = Protected ranking
- SR = Special ranking
- SE = Special exempt
- JE = Junior exempt
- JR = Junior Accelerator Programme entrant
- CO = College Accelerator Programme entrant
- NG = Next Gen Accelerator Program entrant
- w/o = Walkover
- r = Retired
- d = Defaulted

First round
(Romania) VV Cornea (Germany) F Fallert	6	4	[3]
(Germany) M Moraing (Austria) D Novak	4	6	[10]
4	(Portugal) F Cabral (Spain) S Martos Gornés	4	6	[9]
(France) K Jacquet (France) T Lamasine	6	1	[11]
(Czech Republic) J Forejtek (Czech Republic) M Vrbenský	2	6	[10]
(Belgium) R Bemelmans (France) J Eysseric	6	1	[4]
(France) E Furness (France) M Martineau	w/o
(Egypt) M Safwat (Netherlands) T van Rijthoven
(Japan) S Mochizuki (Germany) M Möller	2	7^{7}	[9]
3	(France) S Doumbia (France) F Reboul	6	6^{1}	[11]
(Ukraine) G Kravchenko (Japan) H Moriya	2	2
(Russia) A Kuznetsov (Russia) R Safiullin	6	6

Quarterfinals
1	(Netherlands) S Arends (Netherlands) D Pel	4	6	[10]
(Germany) M Moraing (Austria) D Novak	6	3	[7]
(France) K Jacquet (France) T Lamasine	7	6
(Czech Republic) J Forejtek (Czech Republic) M Vrbenský	5	4
(France) E Furness (France) M Martineau	6	3	[10]
3	(France) S Doumbia (France) F Reboul	3	6	[8]
(Russia) A Kuznetsov (Russia) R Safiullin
2	(France) A Olivetti (Spain) D Vega Hernández	w/o

Semifinals
1	(Netherlands) S Arends (Netherlands) D Pel	7^{8}	6
(France) K Jacquet (France) T Lamasine	6^{6}	4
(France) E Furness (France) M Martineau	3	4
2	(France) A Olivetti (Spain) D Vega Hernández	6	6

Final
1	(Netherlands) S Arends (Netherlands) D Pel	6	4	[8]
2	(France) A Olivetti (Spain) D Vega Hernández	3	6	[10]
