= Hunter Reese =

American tennis player (born 1993)

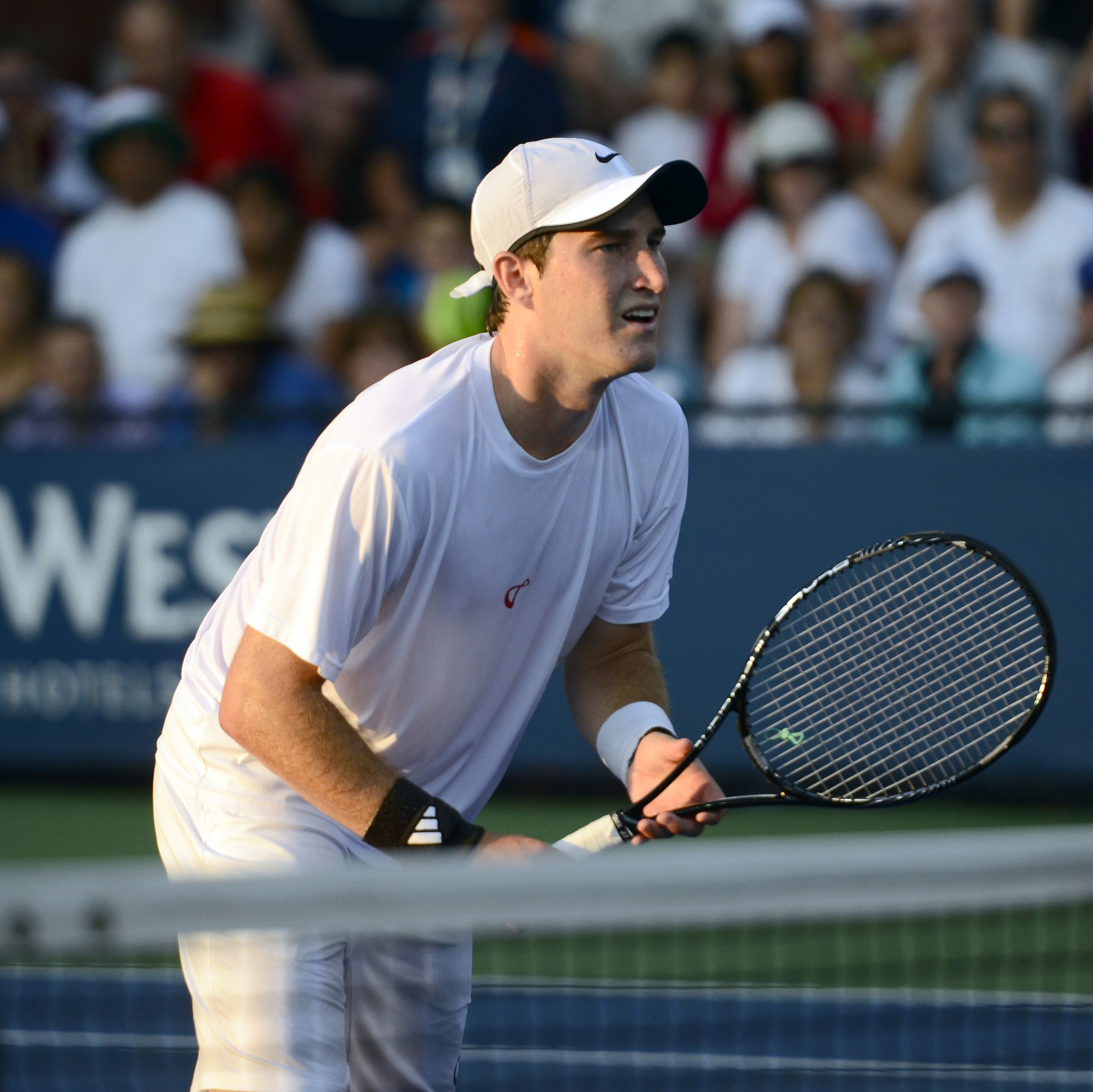
- Country (sports): United States
- Residence: Kennesaw, Georgia, United States
- Born: January 11, 1993 (age 33) Atlanta, United States
- Height: 5 ft 10 in (1.78 m)
- Turned pro: 2015
- Retired: 2024
- Plays: Right Handed (Double Handed Backhand)
- Coach: Markus Kerner
- Prize money: US $289,978

Singles
- Career record: 0-0
- Career titles: 0
- Highest ranking: No. 954 (October 24, 2016)

Doubles
- Career record: 18–29
- Career titles: 0
- Highest ranking: No. 73 (June 27, 2022)

Grand Slam doubles results
- Australian Open: 1R (2023)
- French Open: 2R (2022)
- Wimbledon: 1R (2022)
- US Open: 3R (2021)

Grand Slam mixed doubles results
- US Open: 1R (2021)

Hunter Reese (born January 11, 1993) is a former American tennis player who specializes in doubles. He has a career-high doubles ranking of No. 73 achieved on 27 June 2022 and a doubles ranking of No. 954 achieved on October 24, 2016. Reese currently competes mainly on the ATP Challenger Tour where he has won 10 titles.

== Professional career ==
He competed in the 2014 US Open alongside partner Peter Kobelt after receiving a wildcard into the men's doubles draw. The tandem lost 6–4, 6–1 to Michaël Llodra and Nicolas Mahut. In November 2014, he captured the Knoxville Challenger doubles title with partner Miķelis Lībietis. On November 8, 2014, Reese hit a sliding backhand around the net post during the Knoxville Challenger that was featured on ESPN's Top Ten Plays and received over 100,000 hits on YouTube.

In July 2021 he reached his first ATP final at the 2021 Los Cabos Open partnering Sem Verbeek.

At the 2021 US Open he reached the third round of a Grand Slam for the first time in his career as a wildcard pair partnering fellow American Evan King, defeating ninth seeds Łukasz Kubot/Marcelo Melo in the first round and then Austin Krajicek/Dominic Inglot in the second.

At the 2022 ATP Houston he reached the semifinals with Pablo Cuevas where they were defeated by eventual champions Ebden/Purcell. As a result he reached a new career high in doubles of No. 87 on 25 April 2022.

He made his debut at the 2022 French Open partnering Ramkumar Ramanathan reaching the second round and at the 2022 Wimbledon Championships partnering Roman Jebavý.

In 2023 he made his debut at the Australian Open partnering Cristian Rodríguez as alternate pair thus completing the set of Major appearances.

== College career ==
Reese graduated in May 2015 as a kinesiology major and three time All-American from the University of Tennessee. While representing the Volunteers, Reese paired with Libietis to win three major collegiate doubles championships, conquering the 2014 NCAA Doubles Championship as well as the 2013 and 2014 ITA All-American Doubles Championships. On May 26, 2014, Reese and Libietis, nicknamed "Rock and Hammer", won the 2014 NCAA Doubles Championship after defeating Peter Kobelt and Kevin Metka of Ohio State University 7–6^{(5)}, 6–7^{(3)}, 7–6^{(6)} in a final that, notably, did not contain any breaks of serve. The tandem achieved the #1 ITA collegiate doubles ranking several times during their career, including finishing the season as the top ranked pair in 2014. Although noted for doubles success, Reese also competed in singles for the Volunteers, garnering 90 career wins and peaking at #16 in the ITA collegiate singles rankings while manning either the first or second position in the lineup (following a brief debut at the third position) for the entirety of his time on Rocky Top. A four-time ITA scholar athlete, three-time All-SEC selection, and two-time University of Tennessee Male Athlete of the Year as well as "Mr. Tennessee", Reese was named Team of the Year with Libietis for the Tennessee Sports Hall of Fame's 2014 induction class.

== ATP career finals ==
=== Doubles: 1 (1 runner-up) ===
Legend Grand Slam tournaments (0–0) ATP Finals (0–0) ATP Tour Masters 1000 (0–0) Summer Olympics (0–0) ATP Tour 500 Series (0–0) ATP Tour 250 Series (0–1)	Titles by surface Hard (0–1) Clay (0–0) Grass (0–0)	Titles by location Outdoors (0–1) Indoors (0–0)

Result	W–L	Date	Tournament	Tier	Surface	Partner	Opponents	Score
Loss	0–1	Jul 2021	Los Cabos Open, Mexico	250 Series	Hard	(Netherlands) Sem Verbeek	(Mexico) Hans Hach Verdugo (United States) John Isner	7–5, 2–6, [4–10]

== ATP Challenger and ITF Tour finals ==
=== Doubles: 40 (20–20) ===
Legend (doubles) ATP Challenger Tour (12–10) ITF Futures Tour (8–10)	Titles by surface Hard (9–9) Clay (11–11) Grass (0–0) Carpet (0–0)

Result	W–L	Date	Tournament	Tier	Surface	Partner	Opponents	Score
Win	1–0	Nov 2014	Knoxville, USA	Challenger	Hard (i)	(Latvia) Miķelis Lībietis	(Portugal) Gastão Elias (United Kingdom) Sean Thornley	6–3, 6–4
Loss	1–1	Jul 2015	Lithuania F1, Vilnius	Futures	Clay	(Latvia) Miķelis Lībietis	(Lithuania) Laurynas Grigelis (Lithuania) Lukas Mugevičius	5–7, 6–3, [11–13]
Win	2–1	Jan 2016	USA F5, Weston	Futures	Clay	(United States) Junior Alexander Ore	(Sweden) Isak Arvidsson (Japan) Kaichi Uchida	7–6^{(7–4)}, 3–6, [10–8]
Win	3–1	Mar 2016	Israel F4, Herzliya	Futures	Hard	(United States) Nick Chappell	(Portugal) Romain Barbosa (France) Yannick Jankovits	6–4, 6–2
Win	4–1	May 2016	Israel F7, Ramat Gan	Futures	Hard	(United States) Nicolas Meister	(Israel) Daniel Cukierman (Israel) Edan Leshem	7–5, 7–5
Loss	4–2	May 2016	Israel F8, Ramat Gan	Futures	Hard	(United States) Nicolas Meister	(Australia) Jarryd Chaplin (New Zealand) Ben McLachlan	5–7, 6–7^{(1–7)}
Loss	4–3	Sep 2016	Canada F7, Toronto	Futures	Clay	(United States) Jackson Withrow	(Mexico) Hans Hach (United States) Rhyne Williams	5–7, 4–6
Loss	4–4	Oct 2016	USA F31, Houston	Futures	Hard	(United States) Jackson Withrow	(Mexico) Hans Hach (United States) Rhyne Williams	3–6, 3–6
Loss	4–5	Dec 2016	Dominican Republic F1, Santiago de los Caballeros	Futures	Clay	(United States) Evan King	(Brazil) Eduardo Dischinger (Brazil) Bruno Sant'anna	3–6, 6–7^{(4–7)}
Win	5–5	Apr 2017	USA F14, Orange Park	Futures	Clay	(United States) Evan King	(Australia) Daniel Nolan (Japan) Yosuke Watanuki	2–6, 7–5, [10–8]
Loss	5–6	May 2017	Italy F13, Vigevano	Futures	Clay	(Austria) Sebastian Bader	(Argentina) Franco Agamenone (Argentina) Andrea Collarini	4–6, 3–6
Win	6–6	Jun 2017	Poland F1, Sopot	Futures	Clay	(Latvia) Miķelis Lībietis	(Brazil) Ricardo Hocevar (Brazil) Wilson Leite	6–4, 6–4
Win	7–6	Jul 2017	Netherlands F3, Middelburg	Futures	Clay	(United States) Evan King	(Netherlands) Michiel de Krom (Netherlands) Sem Verbeek	6–2, 6–1
Loss	7–7	Jul 2017	Germany F7, Trier	Futures	Clay	(Australia) Scott Puodziunas	(Romania) Vasile Antonescu (Romania) Patrick Grigoriu	7–5, 4–6, [1–10]
Loss	7–8	Aug 2017	Romania F8, Pitești	Futures	Clay	(Australia) Scott Puodziunas	(Romania) Bogdan Ionuț Apostol (Sweden) Dragoș Nicolae Mădăraș	6–1, 3–6, [9–11]
Loss	7–9	Aug 2017	Netherlands F6, Rotterdam	Futures	Clay	(United States) Nick Chappell	(Netherlands) Botic van de Zandschulp (Netherlands) Boy Westerhof	1–6, 3–6
Win	8–9	Oct 2017	Sweden F4, Falun	Futures	Hard (i)	(Philippines) Ruben Gonzales	(Sweden) Markus Eriksson (Sweden) Milos Sekulic	6–4, 7–6^{(8–6)}
Win	9–9	Oct 2017	Malaysia F1, Kuching	Futures	Hard	(Philippines) Ruben Gonzales	(India) Arjun Kadhe (Germany) Lukas Ollert	5–7, 6–4, [10–5]
Win	10–9	Apr 2018	Sarasota, USA	Challenger	Clay	(United States) Evan King	(United States) Christian Harrison (Canada) Peter Polansky	6–1, 6–2
Loss	10–10	May 2018	Lisbon, Portugal	Challenger	Clay	(Poland) Tomasz Bednarek	(El Salvador) Marcelo Arévalo (Mexico) Miguel Ángel Reyes-Varela	3–6, 6–3, [1–10]
Win	11–10	Sep 2018	Cary, USA	Challenger	Hard	(United States) Evan King	(France) Fabrice Martin (France) Hugo Nys	6–4, 7–6^{(8–6)}
Loss	11–11	Nov 2018	Knoxville, USA	Challenger	Hard (i)	(United States) Tennys Sandgren	(Japan) Toshihide Matsui (Denmark) Frederik Nielsen	6–7^{(6–8)}, 5–7
Loss	11–12	Mar 2019	Indian Wells, USA	Challenger	Hard	(Barbados) Darian King	(United States) JC Aragone (United States) Marcos Giron	4–6, 4–6
Win	12–12	Jun 2019	Fergana, Uzbekistan	Challenger	Hard	(United States) Evan King	(Serbia) Nikola Čačić (Chinese Taipei) Yang Tsung-hua	6–3, 5–7, [10–4]
Loss	12–13	Jul 2019	Winnipeg, Canada	Challenger	Hard	(Canada) Adil Shamasdin	(Barbados) Darian King (Canada) Peter Polansky	6–7^{(8–10)}, 3–6
Loss	12–14	Sep 2019	Kaohsiung, Chinese Taipei	Challenger	Hard	(United States) Evan King	(Chinese Taipei) Hsieh Cheng-peng (Chinese Taipei) Yang Tsung-hua	4–6, 6–7^{(4–7)}
Win	13–14	Sep 2020	Sibiu, Romania	Challenger	Clay	(Poland) Jan Zielinski	(Mexico) Hans Hach Verdugo (United States) Robert Galloway	6–4, 6-2
Loss	13–15	Oct 2020	Split, Croatia	Challenger	Clay	(Sweden) André Göransson	(Philippines) Treat Huey (United States) Nathaniel Lammons	4-6, 6-7^{(3-7)}
Loss	13–16	Feb 2021	Quimper, France	Challenger	Hard (i)	(United States) Brandon Nakashima	(Belgium) Ruben Bemelmans (Germany) Daniel Masur	2-6, 1-6
Loss	13–17	Mar 2021	Cleveland, USA	Challenger	Hard (i)	(United States) Evan King	(United States) Robert Galloway (United States) Alex Lawson	5-7, 7-6^{(7-5)}, [9-11]
Win	14–17	May 2021	Zagreb, Croatia	Challenger	Clay	(United States) Evan King	(Kazakhstan) Andrey Golubev (Kazakhstan) Aleksandr Nedovyesov	6–2, 7–6^{(7–4)}
Win	15–17	May 2021	Oeiras, Portugal	Challenger	Clay	(Netherlands) Sem Verbeek	(France) Sadio Doumbia (France) Fabien Reboul	4–6, 6–4, [10–7]
Loss	15–18	Apr 2022	Ostrava, Czech Republic	Challenger	Clay	(Netherlands) Sem Verbeek	(Austria) Alexander Erler (Austria) Lucas Miedler	6-7^{(5-7)}, 5-7
Win	16–18	May 2022	Poznan, Poland	Challenger	Clay	(Poland) Szymon Walków	(Czech Republic) Marek Gengel (Czech Republic) Adam Pavlásek	1–6, 6–3, [10–6]
Win	17–18	Jul 2022	Indianapolis, USA	Challenger	Hard (i)	(Mexico) Hans Hach Verdugo	(India) Purav Raja (India) Divij Sharan	7–6^{(7–3)}, 3–6, [10–7]
Win	18–18	Nov 2022	Knoxville, USA	Challenger	Hard (i)	(United States) Tennys Sandgren	(United States) Martin Damm (United States) Mitchell Krueger	6–7^{(4–7)}, 7–6^{(7–3)}, [10–5]
Loss	18–19	May 2023	Prague, Czech Republic	Challenger	Clay	(Latvia) Miķelis Lībietis	(France) Dan Added (France) Albano Olivetti	4–6, 3–6
Loss	18–20	Feb 2024	Vila Real de Santo, Portugal	Futures M25	Hard	(Australia) Thomas Fancutt	(Portugal) Joao Domingues (Portugal) Jaime Faria	6–7^{(2–7)}, 6–7^{(2–7)}
Win	19–20	Mar 2024	Kigali, Rwanda	Challenger	Clay	(Australia) Thomas Fancutt	(India) S D Prajwal Dev (Austria) David Pichler	6–1, 7–5
Win	20–20	Mar 2024	Yucatán Open	Challenger	Clay	(Australia) Thomas Fancutt	(United States) Boris Kozlov (United States) Stefan Kozlov	7–5, 6–3
