= Open Quimper Bretagne =

Open Quimper Bretagne Occidentale
- 2025 Open Quimper Bretagne

ATP Challenger Tour
- Location: Quimper, France
- Venue: Kostum Park – À nous la vie (2026-), Parc des Expositions Quimper Cornouaille (-2025)
- Category: ATP Challenger Tour 125
- Surface: Hard (indoor)
- Draw: 32S/32Q/16D
- Prize money: €164,000+H
- Website: Official website

Current champions (2025)
- Singles: (France) Sascha Guyemard
- Doubles: (France) Sadio Doumbia (France) Fabien Reboul

The Open Quimper Bretagne Occidentale (formerly Open BNP Paribas Banque de Bretagne) is a professional tennis tournament part of the ATP Challenger Tour, played on indoor hardcourts. It is held annually in Quimper, France since 2011.

== Past finals ==
=== Singles ===
Year	Champion	Runner-up	Score
2011	(France) David Guez	(France) Kenny de Schepper	6–2, 4–6, 7–6^{(7–5)}
2012	(Netherlands) Igor Sijsling	(Tunisia) Malek Jaziri	6–3, 6–4
2013	(Romania) Marius Copil	(France) Marc Gicquel	7–6^{(11–9)}, 6–4
2014	(France) Pierre-Hugues Herbert	(France) Vincent Millot	7–5, 6–4
2015	(France) Benoît Paire	(France) Grégoire Barrère	6–4, 3–6, 6–4
2016	(Russia) Andrey Rublev	(France) Paul-Henri Mathieu	6–7^{(6–8)}, 6–4, 6–4
2017	(France) Adrian Mannarino	(Germany) Peter Gojowczyk	6–4, 6–4
2018	(France) Quentin Halys	(Russia) Alexey Vatutin	6–3, 7–6^{(7–1)}
2019	(France) Grégoire Barrère	(United Kingdom) Dan Evans	4–6, 6–2, 6–3
2020	(Turkey) Cem İlkel	(France) Maxime Janvier	7–6^{(8–6)}, 7–5
2021 (1)	(United States) Sebastian Korda	(Slovakia) Filip Horanský	6–1, 6–1
2021 (2)	(United States) Brandon Nakashima	(Spain) Bernabé Zapata Miralles	6–3, 6–4
2022	(Canada) Vasek Pospisil	(France) Grégoire Barrère	6–4, 3–6, 6–1
2023	(France) Grégoire Barrère	(France) Arthur Fils	6–1, 6–4
2024	(France) Pierre-Hugues Herbert	(Croatia) Duje Ajduković	6–3, 6–2
2025	(France) Sascha Gueymard Wayenburg	(France) Pierre-Hugues Herbert	6–7^{(3–7)}, 6–1, 6–2
2026	(France) Luca Van Assche	(Switzerland) Rémy Bertola	3–6, 6–1, 7–5

=== Doubles ===
Year	Champions	Runners-up	Score
2011	(United States) James Cerretani (Canada) Adil Shamasdin	(United Kingdom) Jamie Delgado (United Kingdom) Jonathan Marray	6–3, 5–7, [10–5]
2012	(France) Pierre-Hugues Herbert (France) Maxime Teixeira	(Germany) Dustin Brown (United Kingdom) Jonathan Marray	7–6^{(7–5)}, 6–4
2013	(Sweden) Johan Brunström (South Africa) Raven Klaasen	(United Kingdom) Jamie Delgado (United Kingdom) Ken Skupski	3–6, 6–2, [10–3]
2014	(France) Pierre-Hugues Herbert (2) (France) Albano Olivetti	(Croatia) Toni Androić (Croatia) Nikola Mektić	6–4, 6–3
2015	(Italy) Flavio Cipolla (Germany) Dominik Meffert	(Germany) Martin Emmrich (Sweden) Andreas Siljeström	3–6, 7–6^{(7–5)}, [10–8]
2016	(France) Tristan Lamasine (France) Albano Olivetti (2)	(Croatia) Nikola Mektić (Croatia) Antonio Šančić	6–2, 4–6, [10–7]
2017	(Russia) Mikhail Elgin (Slovakia) Igor Zelenay	(United Kingdom) Ken Skupski (United Kingdom) Neal Skupski	2–6, 7–5, [10–5]
2018	(United Kingdom) Ken Skupski (United Kingdom) Neal Skupski	(Belgium) Sander Gillé (Belgium) Joran Vliegen	6–3, 3–6, [10–7]
2019	(France) Fabrice Martin (France) Hugo Nys	(Netherlands) David Pel (Croatia) Antonio Šančić	6–4, 6–2
2020	(Kazakhstan) Andrey Golubev (Kazakhstan) Aleksandr Nedovyesov	(Croatia) Ivan Sabanov (Croatia) Matej Sabanov	6–4, 6–2
2021 (1)	(France) Grégoire Barrère (France) Albano Olivetti (3)	(United States) James Cerretani (Switzerland) Marc-Andrea Hüsler	5–7, 7–6^{(9–7)}, [10–8]
2021 (2)	(Belgium) Ruben Bemelmans (Germany) Daniel Masur	(United States) Brandon Nakashima (United States) Hunter Reese	6–2, 6–1
2022	(France) Albano Olivetti (4) (Spain) David Vega Hernández	(Netherlands) Sander Arends (Netherlands) David Pel	3–6, 6–4, [10–8]
2023	(France) Sadio Doumbia (France) Fabien Reboul	(India) Anirudh Chandrasekar (India) Arjun Kadhe	6–2, 6–4
2024	(France) Manuel Guinard (France) Arthur Rinderknech	(India) Anirudh Chandrasekar (India) Vijay Sundar Prashanth	7–6^{(7–4)}, 6–3
2025	(France) Sadio Doumbia (France) Fabien Reboul	(Monaco) Romain Arneodo (France) Manuel Guinard	6–2, 4–6, [10–3]
2026	(France) Arthur Reymond (France) Luca Sanchez	(France) Dan Added (France) Arthur Bouquier	7–6^{(9–7)}, 3–6, [10–3]
