= Brandon Nakashima =

American tennis player (born 2001)

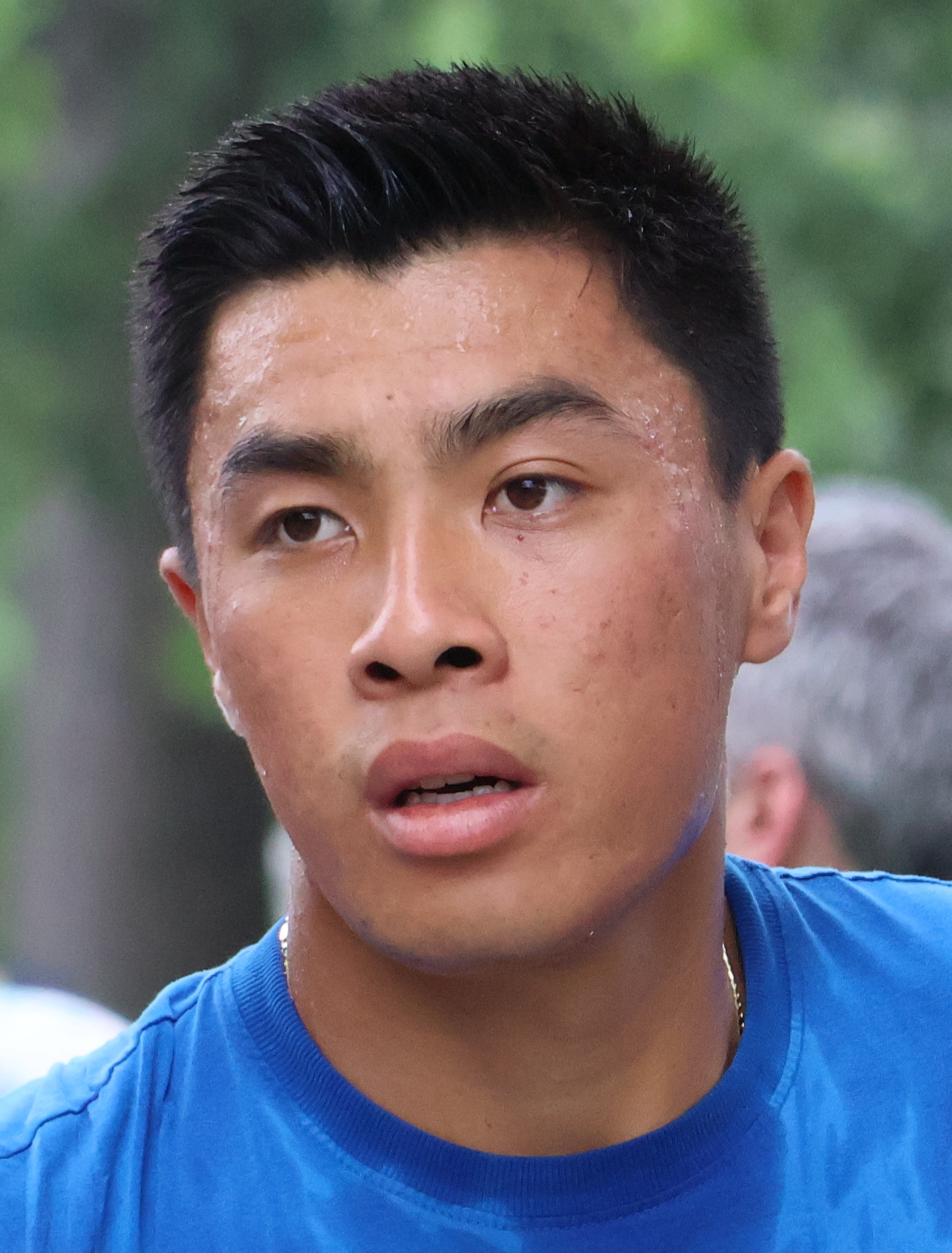
- Nakashima in 2024
- Country (sports): United States
- Residence: San Diego, California, US
- Born: August 3, 2001 (age 25) San Diego, California, US
- Height: 6 ft 2 in (1.88 m)
- Turned pro: 2019
- Plays: Right-handed (two-handed backhand)
- College: University of Virginia
- Coach: Wayne Ferreira (2026- ), Rick Leach (2026), Mariano Puerta, Davide Sanguinetti (2023-2025)
- Prize money: US $9,373,426

Singles
- Career record: 159–127
- Career titles: 1
- Highest ranking: No. 16 (September 14, 2026)
- Current ranking: No. 19 (November 9, 2026)

Grand Slam singles results
- Australian Open: 1R (2022, 2023, 2025, 2026)
- French Open: 3R (2022, 2026)
- Wimbledon: 4R (2022)
- US Open: 4R (2024)

Doubles
- Career record: 15–23
- Career titles: 1
- Highest ranking: No. 193 (February 17, 2025)
- Current ranking: No. 504 (September 14, 2026)

Grand Slam doubles results
- Wimbledon: 1R (2023)
- US Open: 1R (2021, 2024, 2026)

Team competitions
- Davis Cup: QF (2024)
- Last updated on: September 14, 2026.

Brandon Nakashima (born August 3, 2001) is an American professional tennis player. He has a career-high ATP singles ranking of world No. 16 achieved on September 14, 2026 and a best doubles ranking of No. 193 reached on February 17, 2025. He is currently the No. 5 American singles player.

Nakashima has won two ATP Tour titles, one in singles and one in doubles, as well as the 2022 Next Gen Finals.

== Junior career ==
As a junior, Nakashima had good results on the ITF junior circuit. In 2018, after two titles earned in boys' singles, he went on to win that season's ITF Junior Masters, the year-end tournament for the top-ranked junior singles players.

He reached an ITF junior combined ranking of world No. 3 in December 2018.

== College years ==
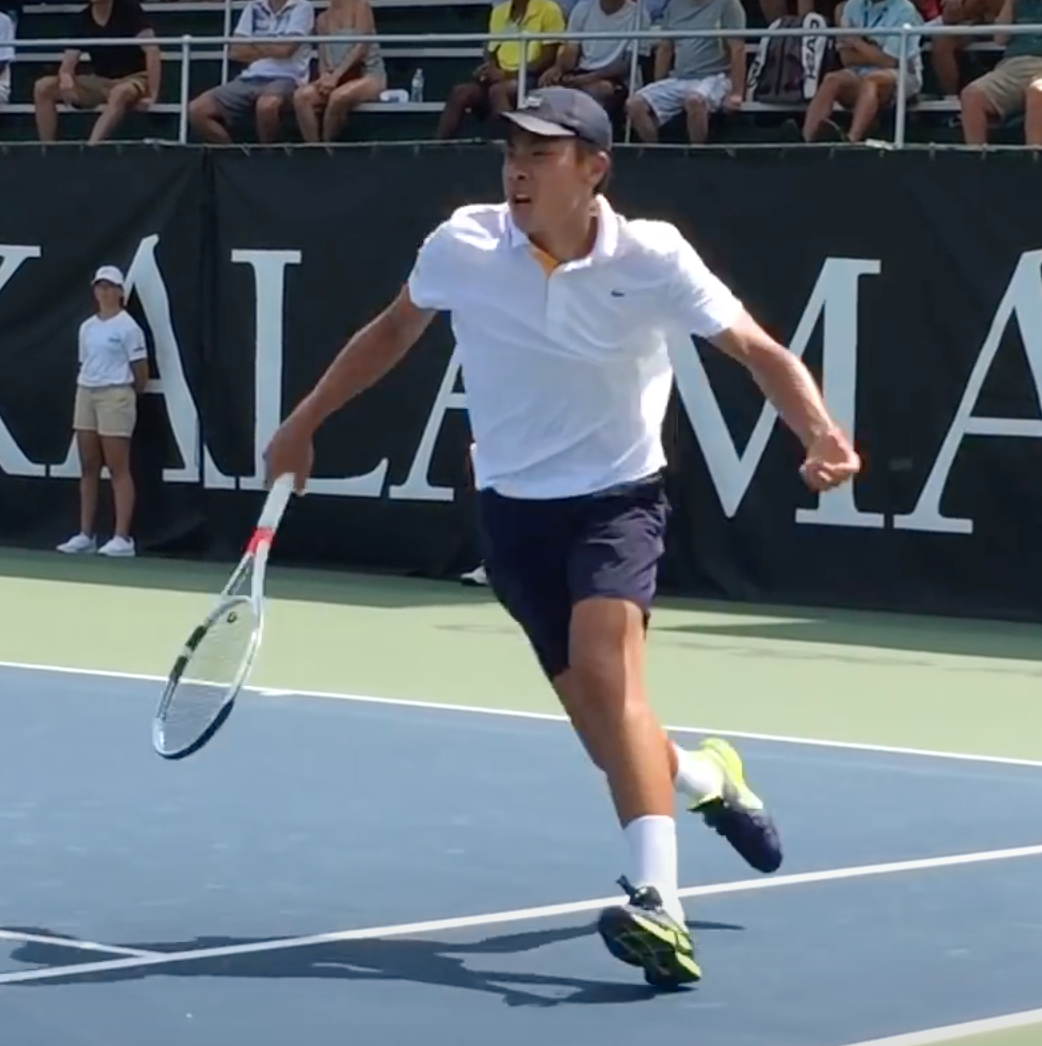
Nakashima at the USTA 18s Nationals in 2018

Nakashima graduated from high school, High Bluff Academy in San Diego, a semester early, before enrolling at the University of Virginia (UVA) in January 2019 at the age of 17 to play collegiate tennis for the Virginia Cavaliers. During his time at UVA, he finished the season with a 17–5 record in singles and 20–3 record in doubles. At the end of the season, he received the ACC-Freshman of the Year and All-ACC First Team awards, and also was selected for the All-ACC Academic Team. After one semester, he decided to forgo his remaining years of eligibility and turn professional.

== Career ==
=== 2020: Major and ATP debuts ===
In February 2020, Nakashima received a wildcard into the Delray Beach Open (his first ATP main draw event), where he reached the quarterfinals, defeating Jiří Veselý and Cameron Norrie before falling to Yoshihito Nishioka.

Later in the year, on his major main draw debut as a wildcard at the US Open, Nakashima defeated Paolo Lorenzi before being beaten by fifth seed and eventual runner-up, Alexander Zverev.

=== 2021: ATP finals, NextGen Finals semi finalist ===
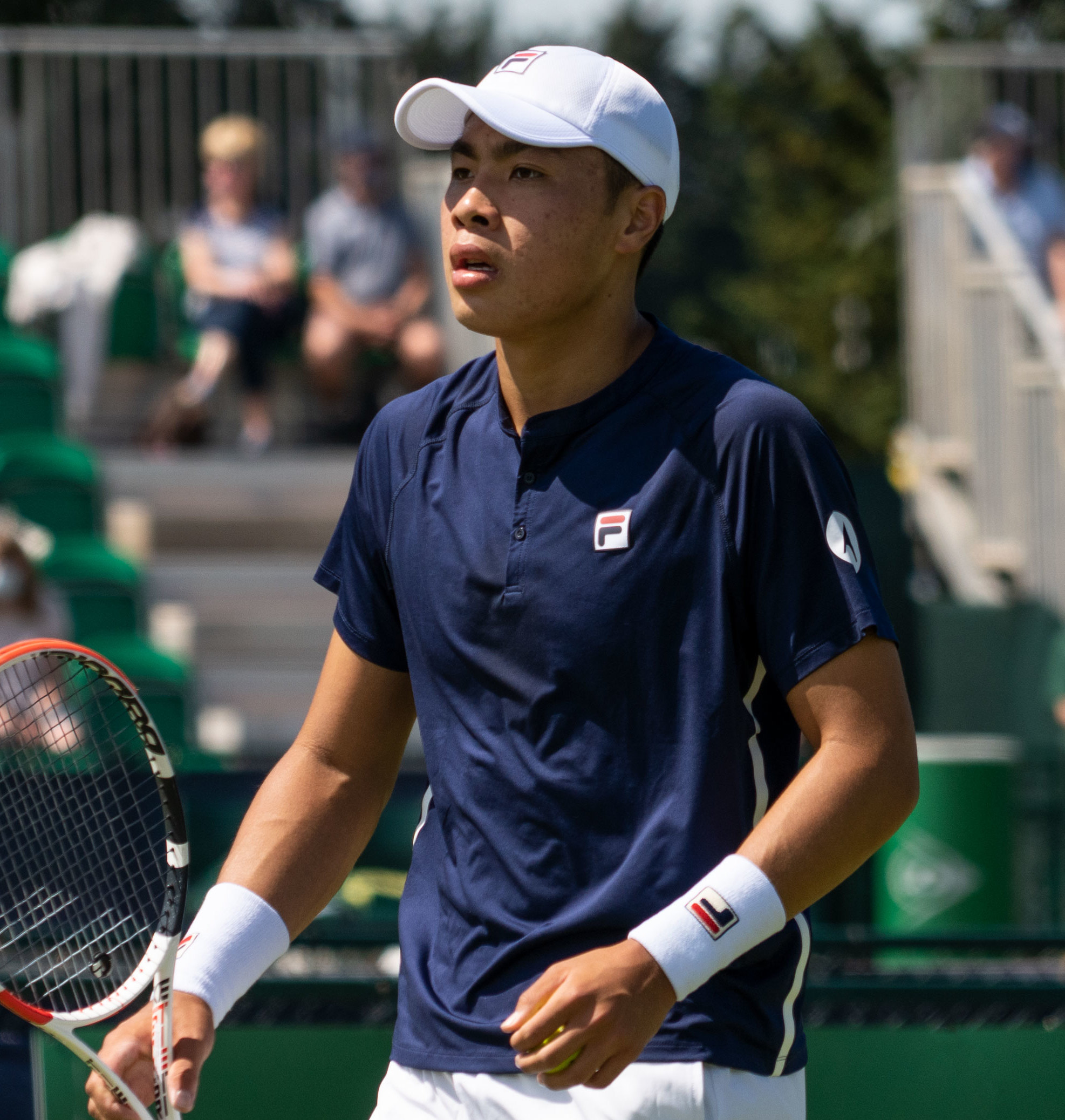
Nakashima at the 2021 Nottingham Open

Nakashima qualified into a Grand Slam main draw for the first time at Wimbledon. He lost in the first round to compatriot and 31st seed, Taylor Fritz.

Nakashima reached his first final in Los Cabos, where after beating J. J. Wolf, fourth seed Sam Querrey, fifth seed Jordan Thompson (after saving 3 match points), and second seed John Isner, he lost to top seed Cameron Norrie in the final. From this run, the 19-year-old Nakashima became the youngest American to reach an ATP final since a then 18-year-old Taylor Fritz got to the final of the Memphis Open in 2016.

A week later in Atlanta, Nakashima reached his second final in as many weeks but lost to sixth seed John Isner in the championship match. As a result of this good run, Nakashima cracked the top 100 for the first time, coming in at world No. 89 on August 2, 2021, a day before his 20th birthday.

As a qualifier at the 2021 European Open, Nakashima reached the quarterfinals where he lost to Diego Schwartzman. As a result, he reached a new career-high singles ranking of No. 70 on 25 October 2021.

Nakashima qualified for the 2021 Next Generation ATP Finals as the fourth seed in recognition of his breakout success in the year among players aged 21 and under. In his group, he notched wins against Juan Manuel Cerúndolo and Holger Rune, taking him to the semifinals, before he lost to eventual finalist Sebastian Korda in five sets. He ended the year at a career-high of No. 62 and was nominated ATP Newcomer of the Year.

=== 2022: San Diego and Next Gen titles, top 50 ===
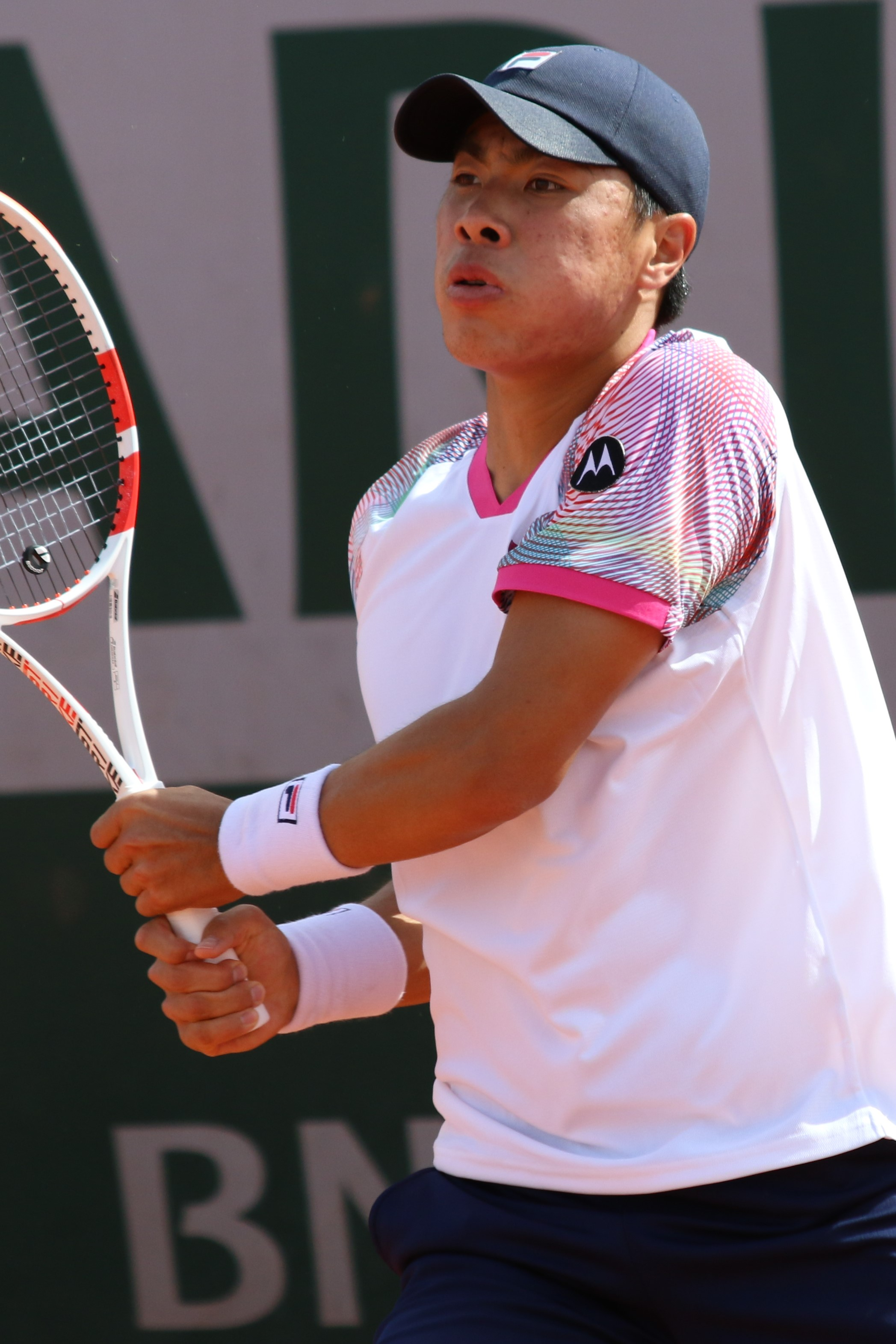
Nakashima at the 2022 French Open

At the 2022 French Open, Nakashima reached the third round of a major for the first time, where he lost to third seed Alexander Zverev.

At the 2022 Wimbledon Championships, he reached the fourth round of a major for the first time in his career, defeating Daniel Elahi Galán. He lost a tight five-set contest to eventual runner-up Nick Kyrgios. He reached the top 50 in the rankings on 11 July 2022, at world No. 49.

Seeded fifth at his home tournament, the 2022 San Diego Open, Nakashima reached his third ATP final after defeating Christopher O'Connell. In the final, he defeated Marcos Giron to win his first career title. He qualified for the 2022 Next Generation ATP Finals and won the title undefeated after beating Jack Draper in the semifinal and Jiří Lehečka in the final.

=== 2023–24: Major fourth round, Masters third round, top 5 win ===
In 2023, Nakashima reached his fourth ATP semifinal in Lyon with wins over Diego Schwartzman, Arthur Rinderknech, third seed Tommy Paul before losing to the eventual champion Arthur Fils. He exited the top 100 on 25 September 2023 despite a second round showing at the 2023 Citi Open and a third round at the 2023 Winston-Salem Open. Nakashima received a wildcard for the Cincinnati Open. At the next ATP 1000 in Shanghai on his debut, he reached the third round for the first time in his career at this ATP level, defeating world No. 4 and third seed Holger Rune for his maiden top-10 and top-5 win. Despite this result he fell out of the top 150 on 30 October 2023. Nakashima returned to the top 100 at No. 96 on 29 January 2024 following a title at the 2024 Tenerife Challenger, in Spain. Nakashima received a wildcard for the 2024 BNP Paribas Open where he defeated Christopher Eubanks. At the next ATP 1000, the 2024 Miami Open, he reached the main draw after qualifying.

At the ATP 500 2024 Barcelona Open Banc Sabadell, he defeated second seed Andrey Rublev, for his second top 10 win in his career. He qualified for the 2024 Mutua Madrid Open and for the Italian Open. He reached the second round at the 2024 French Open with a win over wildcard Nicolas Moreno de Alboran, before losing to eighth seed Hubert Hurkacz. At the 2024 BOSS Open in Stuttgart, Nakashima reached the semifinals defeating seventh seed Jan-Lennard Struff by walkover and returned to the top 65 in the rankings on 17 June 2024. He lost to eventual champion Jack Draper. At the next grass tournament the following week, the 2024 Queen's Club Championships, he defeated wildcard Dan Evans by retirement, using special exempt to enter the main draw. He also reached the third round at the 2024 Wimbledon Championships upsetting 18th seed Sebastian Baez and defeating Jordan Thompson. As a result, he returned to the top 55 in the rankings on 15 July 2024.

Following the 2024 National Bank Open, Nakashima reached back the top 50 in the rankings on 12 August 2024. He recorded a first round win at this Masters over local wildcard Denis Shapovalov and an upset over the tenth seed, Tommy Paul, to reach the round of 16 as a qualifier, only his second third round at a Masters level. He received a wildcard for the main draw of the next Masters 1000, his home tournament, the 2024 Cincinnati Open. He reached back-to-back rounds of 16 with upsets over 11th seed Taylor Fritz and Arthur Fils. At the 2024 US Open, he reached the fourth round for a second time at a Grand Slam with an upset over 15th seed Holger Rune, Arthur Cazaux and 18th seed Lorenzo Musetti, before his run was ended by fourth seed Alexander Zverev. As a result, he moved into the top 40 in the rankings on 9 September 2024. At the 2024 Hangzhou Open he reached his 14th ATP Tour quarterfinal, saving two match points against qualifier Coleman Wong. Next, he defeated Rinky Hijikata to reach his sixth ATP tour semifinal and second for 2024. Nakashima lost in the last four to eventual champion Marin Čilić. At the next Asian swing tournament, the 2024 Japan Open Tennis Championships, he continued his good form, defeating seventh seed Frances Tiafoe in straight sets in the first round. Nakashima lost to Ugo Humbert in the second round.

=== 2025–26: Masters final, top 20 ===
At the ATP 500 2025 Abierto Mexicano Telcel in Acapulco, Nakashima reached the semifinals with an upset win over fourth seed Holger Rune again this time by retirement, and then David Goffin. As a result he reached a new career-high ranking of world No. 33 on 3 March 2025.

At the ATP 500 2026 Queen's Club Championships, Nakashima upset top seed Alex de Minaur, the biggest win of the season, to reach his third tour-level semifinal of 2026, without dropping a set. Seeded 28th at the 2026 National Bank Open, Nakashima reached a Masters quarterfinal for the first time in his career with a win over 23rd seed Arthur Rinderknech. He reached his first Masters semifinal and subsequently his first final defeating 19th seed Luciano Darderi and 20th seed Rafael Jodar respectively. As a result he reached a new career-high singles ranking of world No. 22 on 10 August 2026.

== World TeamTennis ==
Nakashima made his World TeamTennis debut in 2020 with the Chicago Smash for their inaugural season.

Nakashima excelled in singles play for the Smash and also paired up with Rajeev Ram throughout the season in men's doubles to help Chicago earn a No. 2 seed in WTT Playoffs. The Smash defeated the Orlando Storm to earn a spot in the final, but ultimately fell to the New York Empire in a Supertiebreaker.

== Personal life ==
Nakashima's father is a Japanese American born in California, while his mother was born in Vietnam and moved to the United States in her early childhood.

Nakashima’s brother, Bryce, is also a professional tennis player. The two paired up in doubles at the 2024 Atlanta Open.

== Performance timeline ==
Key
W	F	SF	QF	#R	RR	Q#	P#	DNQ	A	Z#	PO	G	S	B	NMS	NTI	P	NH

(W) winner; (F) finalist; (SF) semifinalist; (QF) quarterfinalist; (#R) rounds 4, 3, 2, 1; (RR) round-robin stage; (Q#) qualification round; (P#) preliminary round; (DNQ) did not qualify; (A) absent; (Z#) Davis/Fed Cup Zonal Group (with number indication) or (PO) play-off; (G) gold, (S) silver or (B) bronze Olympic/Paralympic medal; (NMS) not a Masters tournament; (NTI) not a Tier I tournament; (P) postponed; (NH) not held; (SR) strike rate (events won / competed); (W–L) win–loss record.
To avoid confusion and double counting, these charts are updated at the conclusion of a tournament or when the player's participation has ended.

=== Singles ===
Tournament	2018	2019	2020	2021	2022	2023	2024	2025	2026	SR	W–L	Win %
Grand Slam tournaments
Australian Open	A	A	A	Q1	1R	1R	Q1	1R	1R	0 / 4	0–4	0%
French Open	A	A	Q1	Q1	3R	1R	2R	1R	3R	0 / 5	5–5	50%
Wimbledon	A	A	NH	1R	4R	1R	3R	3R	2R	0 / 6	8–6	57%
US Open	Q2	A	2R	2R	3R	1R	4R	2R	2R	0 / 7	9–7	56%
Win–loss	0–0	0–0	1–1	1–2	7–4	0–4	6–3	3–4	4–4	0 / 22	22–22	50%
ATP 1000
Indian Wells Open	Q1	A	NH	2R	2R	2R	2R	4R	3R	0 / 6	7–6	54%
Miami Open	A	A	NH	Q2	2R	2R	1R	4R	2R	0 / 5	4–5	44%
Monte-Carlo Masters	A	A	NH	A	A	A	A	1R	A	0 / 1	0–1	0%
Madrid Open	A	A	NH	A	Q1	A	1R	4R	2R	0 / 3	2–3	40%
Italian Open	A	A	A	A	1R	1R	1R	3R	3R	0 / 5	1–5	17%
Canadian Open	A	A	NH	A	1R	1R	3R	3R	F	0 / 5	8–5	62%
Cincinnati Open	A	A	Q1	1R	1R	1R	3R	3R	SF	0 / 6	7–6	54%
Shanghai Masters	A	A	NH			3R	2R	2R	3R	0 / 4	3–4	43%
Paris Masters	A	A	A	A	1R	A	1R	1R	1R	0 / 4	0–4	0%
Win–loss	0–0	0–0	0–0	1–2	2–6	4–6	5–8	8–9	12–8	0 / 37	32–39	45%
Career statistics
Tournaments	0	0	2	10	24	20	23	29	17	Career total: 125		
Titles	0	0	0	0	1	0	0	0	0	Career total: 1		
Finals	0	0	0	2	1	0	0	0	2	Career total: 5		
Overall win–loss	0–0	0–0	3–2	17–12	35–23	13–20	27–23	32–29	31–17	1 / 125	158–126	56%
Year-end ranking	790	371	166	68	47	134	38	35		$8,818,270		

== ATP 1000 tournaments finals ==
=== Singles: 1 (runner-up) ===
Result	Year	Tournament	Surface	Opponent	Score
Loss	2026	Canadian Open	Hard	(United States) Ben Shelton	3–6, 6–7^{(4–7)}

== ATP Tour finals ==
=== Singles: 5 (1 title, 4 runner-ups) ===
Legend Grand Slam (–) ATP 1000 (0–1) ATP 500 (–) ATP 250 (1–3)	Finals by surface Hard (1–4) Clay (–) Grass (–)	Finals by setting Outdoor (1–4) Indoor (–)

Result	W–L	Date	Tournament	Tier	Surface	Opponent	Score
Loss	0–1	Jul 2021	Los Cabos Open, Mexico	ATP 250	Hard	(United Kingdom) Cameron Norrie	2–6, 2–6
Loss	0–2	Jul 2021	Atlanta Open, US	ATP 250	Hard	(United States) John Isner	6–7^{(8–10)}, 5–7
Win	1–2	Sep 2022	San Diego Open, US	ATP 250	Hard	(United States) Marcos Giron	6–4, 6–4
Loss	1–3	Jan 2026	Brisbane International, Australia	ATP 250	Hard	Daniil Medvedev	2–6, 6–7^{(1–7)}
Loss	1–4	Aug 2026	Canadian Open, Canada	ATP 1000	Hard	(United States) Ben Shelton	3–6, 6–7^{(4–7)}

=== Doubles: 1 (title) ===
Legend Grand Slam (–) ATP 1000 (–) ATP 500 (–) ATP 250 (1–0)	Finals by surface Hard (1–0) Clay (–) Grass (–)	Finals by setting Outdoor (1–0) Indoor (–)

Result	W–L	Date	Tournament	Tier	Surface	Partner	Opponents	Score
Win	1–0	Feb 2025	Delray Beach Open, US	ATP 250	Hard	(Serbia) Miomir Kecmanović	(United States) Christian Harrison (United States) Evan King	7–6^{(7–3)}, 1–6, [10–3]

== ATP Next Generation finals ==
=== Singles: 1 (title) ===
Result	Date	Tournament	Surface	Opponent	Score
Win	Nov 2022	Next Generation ATP Finals, Italy	Hard (i)	(Czech Republic) Jiří Lehečka	4–3^{(7–5)}, 4–3^{(8–6)}, 4–2

== ATP Challenger and ITF Tour finals ==
=== Singles: 8 (6 titles, 2 runner-ups) ===
Legend ATP Challenger (4–2) ITF Futures/WTT (2–0)	Finals by surface Hard (6–2) Clay (–)

Result	W–L	Date	Tournament	Tier	Surface	Opponent	Score
Win	1–0	Nov 2020	Orlando Open, US	Challenger	Hard	(India) Prajnesh Gunneswaran	6–3, 6–4
Win	2–0	Feb 2021	Open Quimper Bretagne, France	Challenger	Hard (i)	(Spain) Bernabé Zapata Miralles	6–3, 6–4
Win	3–0	Oct 2021	Brest Challenger, France	Challenger	Hard (i)	(Portugal) João Sousa	6–3, 6–3
Loss	3–1	Nov 2023	Good to Great Challenger, Sweden	Challenger	Hard (i)	(Germany) Maximilian Marterer	6–2, 4–6, 3–6
Win	4–1	Jan 2024	Tenerife Challenger, Spain	Challenger	Hard	(Spain) Pedro Martínez	6–3, 6–4
Loss	4–2	Jan 2024	Koblenz Open, Germany	Challenger	Hard (i)	(Austria) Jurij Rodionov	7–6^{(9–7)}, 1–6, 2–6

Result	W–L	Date	Tournament	Tier	Surface	Opponent	Score
Win	1–0	Sep 2018	F25 Laguna Niguel, US	Futures	Hard	(France) Maxime Cressy	6–4, 6–4
Win	2–0	Jan 2020	M25 Rancho Santa Fe, US	WTT	Hard	(France) Geoffrey Blancaneaux	6–3, 6–3

=== Doubles: 3 (2 titles, 1 runner-up) ===
Legend ATP Challenger (2–1) ITF Futures/WTT (–)	Finals by surface Hard (2–1) Clay (–)

Result	W–L	Date	Tournament	Tier	Surface	Partner	Opponents	Score
Loss	0–1	Feb 2021	Open Quimper Bretagne, France	Challenger	Hard (i)	(United States) Hunter Reese	(Belgium) Ruben Bemelmans (Germany) Daniel Masur	2–6, 1–6
Win	1–1	Oct 2023	Trofeo Faip–Perrel, Italy	Challenger	Hard (i)	(United States) Evan King	(Portugal) Francisco Cabral (United Kingdom) Henry Patten	6–4, 7–6^{(7–1)}
Win	2–1	Feb 2024	Teréga Open Pau–Pyrénées, France	Challenger	Hard (i)	(United States) Christian Harrison	(Monaco) Romain Arneodo (Austria) Sam Weissborn	7–6^{(7–5)}, 6–4

== Wins over top 10 players ==
- Nakashima has a 6–22 (21.43%) record against players who were, at the time the match was played, ranked in the top 10.

Season	2019–22	2023	2024	2025	2026	Total
Wins	0	1	1	0	4	6

#	Player	Rk	Event	Surface	Rd	Score	BNR	Ref
2023
1.	(Denmark) Holger Rune	5	Shanghai Open, China	Hard	2R	6–0, 6–2	122	
2024
2.	Andrey Rublev	8	Barcelona Open, Spain	Clay	2R	6–4, 7–6^{(8–6)}	87	
2026
3.	(Australia) Alex de Minaur	6	Queen's Club, United Kingdom	Grass	QF	7–5, 6–3	32	
4.	(Australia) Alex de Minaur	6	Washington Open, United States	Hard	QF	7–6^{(7–5)}, 6–4	33	
5.	Daniil Medvedev	7	Cincinnati Open, United States	Hard	3R	6–7^{(3–7)}, 7–6^{(7–4)}, 6–1	22	
6.	(United States) Taylor Fritz	9	Cincinnati Open, United States	Hard	QF	7–6^{(11–9)}, 4–6, 6–3	22	

*As of 18 August 2026

== Exhibition matches ==
=== Singles ===
Result	Date	Tournament	Surface	Opponent	Score
Win	Jul 2026	Ultimate Tennis Showdown, Rio de Janeiro, Brazil	Hard (i)	(Brazil) Luís Guto Miguel	15–14, 17–14, 15–13
