= Cem İlkel =

Turkish tennis player (born 1995)

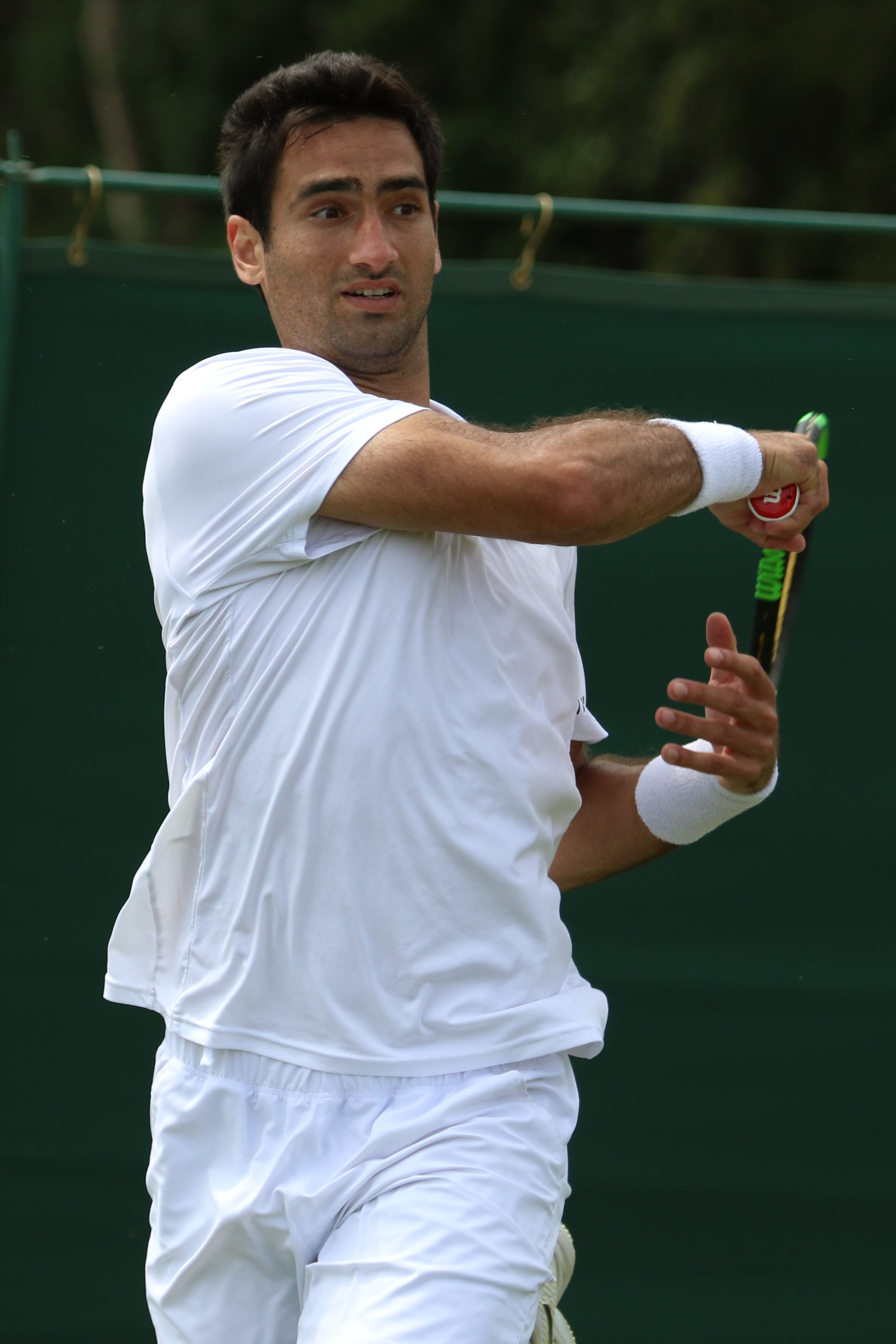
- İlkel at the 2023 Wimbledon Championships
- Full name: Cem İlkel
- Country (sports): Turkey
- Residence: Istanbul, Türkiye
- Born: 21 August 1995 (age 31) İstanbul, Türkiye
- Height: 1.85 m (6 ft 1 in)
- Turned pro: 2013
- Plays: Right-handed (two-handed backhand)
- Prize money: $757,554

Singles
- Career record: 11–32 (at ATP Tour level, Grand Slam level, and in Davis Cup)
- Career titles: 0
- Highest ranking: No. 144 (29 November 2021)
- Current ranking: —

Grand Slam singles results
- Australian Open: Q2 (2019, 2021)
- French Open: Q1 (2020, 2021, 2022, 2023)
- Wimbledon: Q1 (2021, 2022, 2023)
- US Open: 1R (2021)

Doubles
- Career record: 4–15 (at ATP Tour level, Grand Slam level, and in Davis Cup)
- Career titles: 0
- Highest ranking: No. 299 (27 August 2018)
- Current ranking: —

Team competitions
- Davis Cup: 12–18
- Last updated on: 15 July 2026.

Cem İlkel (born 21 August 1995) is a Turkish professional tennis player. He has a career high ATP singles ranking of No. 144 achieved on 29 November 2021. He also has a career high ATP doubles ranking of No. 299 achieved on 27 August 2018.

Ilkel has won one ATP Challenger title in singles and has a singles final record of 5 wins and 20 losses, and a doubles final record of 13 wins and 11 losses.

Playing for Turkey in Davis Cup, İlkel has a W/L record of 12–18.

== Professional career ==
İlkel made his Grand Slam debut at the 2017 US Open as a qualifier. In eight attempts at gaining entry through qualifying, Ilkel did not reach the main draw of a Grand Slam tournament. But on his ninth attempt, ranked No. 189, Ilkel reached the main draw of the 2021 US Open.

İlkel won his only ATP Challenger Tour title thus far in his career at the 2020 Open Quimper Bretagne, which was held in Quimper, France. In the final, he defeated Maxime Janvier of France, 7–6^{(8–6)}, 7–5.

İlkel became the third Turkish player to reach an ATP quarterfinal at the 2023 Sofia Open, after Remzi Aydin at 1968 Hobart and Marsel Ilhan at 2015 Dubai.

== ATP Challenger and ITF Tour finals ==
=== Singles: 26 (5–21) ===
Legend ATP Challenger (1–6) ITF Futures (4–15)	Finals by surface Hard (4–18) Clay (1–3)

Result	W–L	Date	Tournament	Tier	Surface	Opponent	Score
Loss	0–1	Apr 2014	Egypt F15, Sharm El Sheikh,	Futures	Clay	(Cyprus) Petros Chrysochos	3–6, 3–6
Loss	0–2	Jun 2014	Turkey F18, Antalya,	Futures	Hard	(United Kingdom) David Rice	6–4, 4–6, 3–6
Loss	0–3	Aug 2014	Turkey F29, Antalya,	Futures	Hard	(Bulgaria) Dimitar Kuzmanov	1–6, 3–6
Win	1–3	Nov 2014	Turkey F39, Antalya,	Futures	Hard	(Kazakhstan) Dmitry Popko	6–3, 6–1
Loss	1–4	Aug 2015	Turkey F33, İzmir,	Futures	Hard	(France) Benjamin Bonzi	6–7^{(2–7)}, 5–7
Loss	1–5	Nov 2015	Turkey F43, Antalya,	Futures	Hard	(Belgium) Yannik Reuter	7–5, 6–7^{(9–11)}, 6–7^{(2–7)}
Loss	1–6	Dec 2015	Turkey F49, Antalya,	Futures	Hard	(Czech Republic) Michal Konecny	0–6, 1–6
Loss	1–7	Apr 2016	Turkey F13, Antalya,	Futures	Hard	(Spain) David Pérez Sanz	2–6, 6–7^{(1–7)}
Loss	1–8	Apr 2016	Turkey F15, Antalya,	Futures	Hard	(Germany) Marc Sieber	6–2, 4–6, 4–6
Loss	1–9	May 2016	Turkey F21, Antalya,	Futures	Hard	(Belgium) Christopher Heyman	3–6, 6–7^{(5–7)}
Loss	1–10	Jun 2016	Turkey F25, Muğla	Futures	Hard	(Italy) Riccardo Bellotti	5–7, 5–7
Loss	1–11	Sep 2016	İzmir, Turkey	Challenger	Hard	(Turkey) Marsel İlhan	2–6, 4–6
Win	2–11	Jan 2017	Turkey F3, Antalya,	Futures	Hard	(Netherlands) Tallon Griekspoor	6–4, 1–0 ret.
Loss	2–12	Mar 2017	Turkey F11, Antalya,	Futures	Clay	(Germany) Marvin Netuschil	7–5, 5–7, 1–6
Loss	2–13	May 2017	Qarshi, Uzbekistan	Challenger	Hard	(Belarus) Egor Gerasimov	3–6, 6–7^{(4–7)}
Loss	2–14	Nov 2017	Egypt F34, Sharm El Sheikh,	Futures	Hard	(Russia) Roman Safiullin	5–7, 6–7^{(3–7)}
Loss	2–15	Dec 2017	Turkey F45, Antalya,	Futures	Clay	(Austria) Lenny Hampel	5–7, 6–4, 3–6
Win	3–15	Apr 2018	Turkey F12, Antalya,	Futures	Clay	(Serbia) Marko Miladinović	2–6, 6–2, 6–2
Loss	3–16	Jun 2018	Uzbekistan F3, Andijan,	Futures	Hard	(Uzbekistan) Sanjar Fayziev	6–7^{(7–9)}, 4–6
Win	4–16	Jun 2018	Uzbekistan F4, Namangan,	Futures	Hard	(Russia) Roman Safiullin	6–1, 7–6^{(14–12)}
Win	5–16	Feb 2020	Quimper, France	Challenger	Hard	(France) Maxime Janvier	7–6^{(8–6)}, 7–5
Loss	5–17	Jul 2021	Pozoblanco, Spain	Challenger	Hard	(Turkey) Altuğ Çelikbilek	1–6, 7–6^{(7–2)}, 3–6
Loss	5–18	Nov 2021	Bergamo, Italy	Challenger	Hard (i)	(Denmark) Holger Rune	5–7, 6–7^{(6–8)}
Loss	5–19	Oct 2022	Vilnius, Lithuania	Challenger	Hard (i)	(Italy) Mattia Bellucci	6–1, 3–6, 5–7
Loss	5–20	Mar 2023	Lugano, Switzerland	Challenger	Hard (i)	(Finland) Otto Virtanen	4–6, 7–6^{(5–7)}
Loss	5–21	Jul 2023	M25 Roda de Bara, Spain	Tennis Tour	Hard	(Spain) Imanol López Morillo	4–6, 4–6

=== Doubles: 24 (13–11) ===
Legend ATP Challenger (0–1) ITF Futures (13–10)	Finals by surface Hard (9–10) Clay (4–1)

Result	W–L	Date	Tournament	Tier	Surface	Partner	Opponents	Score
Win	1–0	Feb 2014	Turkey F2, Antalya	Futures	Hard	(Turkey) Anil Yuksel	(Spain) Carlos Boluda-Purkiss (Spain) Roberto Ortega Olmedo	6–0, 7–6^{(7–3)}
Loss	1–1	Jun 2014	Turkey F18, Antalya	Futures	Hard	(Turkey) Efe Yurtacan	(Ukraine) Marat Deviatiarov (Turkey) Baris Erguden	5–7, 2–6
Win	2–1	Jun 2014	Turkey F19, Bodrum	Futures	Clay	(Turkey) Efe Yurtacan	(Turkey) Anil Yuksel (Turkey) Baris Erguden	6–4, 7–5
Win	3–1	Jun 2014	Turkey F21, Istanbul	Futures	Hard	(Turkey) Efe Yurtacan	(Turkey) Sarp Ağabigün (Turkey) Altuğ Çelikbilek	6–4, 7–6^{(7–5)}
Loss	3–2	Jan 2015	Turkey F1, Antalya	Futures	Hard	(Turkey) Efe Yurtacan	(Japan) Arata Onozawa (Japan) Shuichi Sekiguchi	3–6, 6–1, [5–10]
Win	4–2	Feb 2015	Egypt F6, Sharm El Sheikh	Futures	Hard	(Turkey) Anil Yuksel	(Austria) Lucas Miedler (Austria) Maximilian Neuchrist	6–7^{(1–7)}, 6–3, [10–7]
Loss	4–3	May 2015	Egypt F17, Sharm El Sheikh	Futures	Hard	(Turkey) Baris Erguden	(Egypt) Sherif Sabry (Egypt) Karim-Mohamed Maamoun	4–6, 2–6
Win	5–3	Jul 2015	Turkey F27, Istanbul	Futures	Hard	(Turkey) Anil Yuksel	(Turkey) Sarp Ağabigün (Turkey) Muhammet Haylaz	6–4, 7–6^{(7–2)}
Win	6–3	Aug 2015	Turkey F34, Antalya	Futures	Hard	(Turkey) Tuna Altuna	(Ukraine) Vadim Alekseenko (Netherlands) Miliaan Niesten	6–0, 6–1
Loss	6–4	Nov 2015	Turkey F43, Antalya	Futures	Hard	(Turkey) Tuna Altuna	(Kazakhstan) Alexander Bublik (Serbia) Darko Jandric	6–3, 4–6, [8–10]
Loss	6–5	Nov 2015	Turkey F44, Antalya	Futures	Clay	(Turkey) Tuna Altuna	(Bosnia and Herzegovina) Tomislav Brkić (Serbia) Darko Jandric	6–7^{(3–7)}, 3–6
Loss	6–6	Dec 2015	Turkey F50, Antalya	Futures	Hard	(Turkey) Tuna Altuna	(Austria) David Pichler (Austria) Lenny Hampel	2–6, 1–6
Win	7–6	Dec 2015	Turkey F52, Antalya	Futures	Hard	(Turkey) Tuna Altuna	(Turkey) Sarp Ağabigün (Turkey) Altuğ Çelikbilek	4–6, 6–2, [10–6]
Loss	7–7	Jun 2016	Turkey F24, Antalya	Futures	Hard	(Australia) Goran Marijan	(Argentina) Franco Agamenone (Argentina) Nicolas Alberto Arreche	6–7^{(5–7)}, 7–6^{(7–3)}, [11–13]
Win	8–7	Jun 2016	Turkey F25, Mugia	Futures	Hard	(Turkey) Tuna Altuna	(Bolivia) Hugo Dellien (Bolivia) Federico Zeballos	7–5, 6–3
Win	9–7	Dec 2016	Turkey F48, Mugia	Futures	Hard	(Turkey) Tuna Altuna	(Bulgaria) Aleksandar Lazov (Ukraine) Marat Deviatiarov	6–4, 6–2
Win	10–7	Dec 2016	Turkey F51, Antalya	Futures	Hard	(Turkey) Yanki Erel	(Ukraine) Olexiy Kolisnyk (Ukraine) Oleg Prihodko	6–4, 6–3
Win	11–7	Mar 2017	Turkey F10, Antalya	Futures	Clay	(Turkey) Tuna Altuna	(Belgium) Sander Gillé (Belgium) Joran Vliegen	0–6, 6–2, [10–8]
Loss	11–8	Nov 2017	Egypt F33, Sharm El Sheikh	Futures	Hard	(Turkey) Tuna Altuna	(Ukraine) Vladyslav Manafov (Poland) Adrian Andrzejczuk	1–6, 0–6
Loss	11–9	Nov 2017	Egypt F34, Sharm El Sheikh	Futures	Hard	(Turkey) Tuna Altuna	(Ukraine) Vladyslav Manafov (Spain) Roberto Ortega Olmedo	3–6, 4–6
Loss	11–10	Nov 2017	Egypt F35, Sharm El Sheikh	Futures	Hard	(Turkey) Tuna Altuna	(Ukraine) Vladyslav Manafov (Spain) David Pérez Sanz	2–6, 3–6
Loss	11–11	Feb 2018	Chennai, India	Challenger	Hard	(Serbia) Danilo Petrovic	(India) N.Sriram Balaji (India) Vishnu Vardhan	6–7^{(5–7)}, 7–5, [5–10]
Win	12–11	Mar 2018	Turkey F11, Antalya	Futures	Clay	(Turkey) Altuğ Çelikbilek	(Brazil) Rafael Matos (Brazil) Marcelo Zormann	1–6, 6–4, [10–8]
Win	13–11	Apr 2018	Turkey F12, Antalya	Futures	Clay	(Turkey) Anil Yuksel	(Ukraine) Olexiy Kolisnyk (Ukraine) Oleg Prihodko	4–6, 6–2, [10–7]

== Performance timeline ==
Key
W	F	SF	QF	#R	RR	Q#	DNQ	A	NH

(W) winner; (F) finalist; (SF) semifinalist; (QF) quarterfinalist; (#R) rounds 4, 3, 2, 1; (RR) round-robin stage; (Q#) qualification round; (DNQ) did not qualify; (A) absent; (NH) not held; (SR) strike rate (events won / competed); (W–L) win–loss record.
To avoid confusion and double counting, these charts are updated at the conclusion of a tournament or when the player's participation has ended.

=== Singles ===
Tournament	2017	2018	2019	2020	2021	2022	SR	W–L	Win %
Grand Slam tournaments
Australian Open	A	Q1	Q2	A	Q2	Q1	0 / 0	0–0	–
French Open	A	A	A	Q1	Q1	Q1	0 / 0	0–0	–
Wimbledon	A	A	A	NH	Q1	Q1	0 / 0	0–0	–
US Open	Q2	A	Q2	A	1R	A	0 / 1	0–1	0%
Win–loss	0–0	0–0	0–0	0–0	0–1	0–0	0 / 1	0–1	0%
