= 2009 Poznań Porsche Open =

- Date: 18 – 26 July
- Edition: 6th
- Category: Tretorn SERIE+
- Draw: 32S/32Q/16D
- Prize money: €64,000+H
- Surface: Clay
- Location: Poznań, Poland
- Venue: Park Tenisowy Olimpia

Champions

Singles
- (Australia) Peter Luczak

Doubles
- (Argentina) Sergio Roitman / (France) Alexandre Sidorenko
← 2008 ·	Poznań Porsche Open	· 2010 →

The 2009 Poznań Porsche Open was a professional tennis tournament played on clay courts. It was the sixth edition of the tournament which was part of the 2009 ATP Challenger Tour and Tretorn SERIE+. It took place at the Park Tenisowy Olimpia in Poznań, Poland from 18 to 26 July 2009, including the qualifying competition in the first two days.

== Singles main draw entrants ==
=== Seeds ===
Country	Player	Rank	Seed
CHI	Paul Capdeville	77	1
CHI	Nicolás Massú	93	2
ESP	Rubén Ramírez Hidalgo	106	3
ARG	Sergio Roitman	115	4
POR	Rui Machado	117	5
GER	Denis Gremelmayr	136	6
AUS	Peter Luczak	145	7
FRA	Laurent Recouderc	146	8

=== Other entrants ===
The following players received wildcards into the singles main draw:

- (Argentina) Gastón Gaudio
- (Poland) Marcin Gawron
- (Poland) Jerzy Janowicz
- (Poland) Andriej Kapaś

The following players received entry from the qualifying draw:

- (Poland) Adam Chadaj
- (Ukraine) Oleksandr Dolgopolov Jr.
- (Slovakia) Martin Kližan
- (Poland) Michał Przysiężny

The following player received entry as a lucky losers:

- (Spain) Ignacio Coll-Riudavets
- (Spain) Andoni Vivanco-Guzmán

=== Withdrawals ===
Before the tournament

- (France) Nicolas Devilder
- (Austria) Andreas Haider-Maurer
- (Peru) Luis Horna

== Doubles main draw entrants ==
=== Seeds ===
Country	Player	Country	Player	Rank	Seed
GER	Michael Kohlmann	NED	Rogier Wassen	110	1
ESP	David Marrero	ESP	Rubén Ramírez Hidalgo	172	2
GER	Philipp Marx	ITA	Alessandro Motti	196	3
GBR	Jamie Delgado	GBR	Jamie Murray	227	4

=== Other entrants ===
The following pairs received wildcards into the doubles main draw:

- (Poland) Tomasz Bednarek / (Poland) Michał Przysiężny
- (Poland) Marcin Gawron / (Poland) Andriej Kapaś
- (Poland) Kacper Owsian / (Poland) Jakub Piter

== Champions ==
=== Singles ===
(Australia) Peter Luczak def. (Kazakhstan) Yuri Schukin, 3–6, 7–6(4), 7–6(6)

=== Doubles ===
(Argentina) Sergio Roitman / (France) Alexandre Sidorenko def. (Germany) Michael Kohlmann / (Netherlands) Rogier Wassen, 6–4, 6–4
