= 2010 Poznań Porsche Open =

- Date: 17 – 25 July
- Edition: 7th
- Category: Tretorn SERIE+
- Draw: 32S/29Q/16D
- Prize money: €85,000+H
- Surface: Clay
- Location: Poznań, Poland
- Venue: Park Tenisowy Olimpia

Champions

Singles
- (Germany) Denis Gremelmayr

Doubles
- (Portugal) Rui Machado / (Spain) Daniel Muñoz de la Nava
← 2009 ·	Poznań Porsche Open	· 2011 →

The 2010 Poznań Porsche Open was a professional tennis tournament played on clay courts. It was the seventh edition of the tournament which was part of the 2010 ATP Challenger Tour and the Tretorn SERIE+ tour. It took place at the Park Tenisowy Olimpia in Poznań, Poland from 17 to 25 July 2010, including the qualifying competition in the first two days.

== Singles main draw entrants ==
=== Seeds ===
Country	Player	Rank	Seed
AUS	Peter Luczak	78	1
POR	Frederico Gil	85	2
JAM	Dustin Brown	99	3
POR	Rui Machado	123	4
ESP	Óscar Hernández	156	5
ITA	Simone Vagnozzi	166	6
CRO	Antonio Veić	174	7
CZE	Dušan Lojda	178	8

=== Other entrants ===
The following players received wildcards into the singles main draw:

- (Poland) Marcin Gawron
- (Poland) Andriej Kapaś
- (Poland) Grzegorz Panfil
- (Poland) Maciej Smoła

The following players received entry from the qualifying draw:

- (Brazil) André Ghem
- (Spain) Javier Martí
- (Poland) Dawid Olejniczak
- (Czech Republic) Roman Vögeli

=== Withdrawals ===
Before the tournament

- (Germany) Andre Begemann
- (Turkey) Marsel İlhan
- (Finland) Henri Kontinen
- (Chile) Nicolás Massú

== Doubles main draw entrants ==
=== Seeds ===
Country	Player	Country	Player	Rank	Seed
USA	James Cerretani	CAN	Adil Shamasdin	208	1
POL	Tomasz Bednarek	GER	Frank Moser	209	2
BRA	Franco Ferreiro	ARG	Sebastián Prieto	221	3
JAM	Dustin Brown	NED	Rogier Wassen	229	4

=== Other entrants ===
The following pairs received wildcards into the doubles main draw:

- (Poland) Marcin Gawron / (Poland) Andriej Kapaś
- (Brazil) André Ghem / (Spain) Javier Martí
- (Poland) Grzegorz Panfil / (Poland) Maciej Smoła

== Champions ==
=== Singles ===
(Germany) Denis Gremelmayr def. (Russia) Andrey Kuznetsov, 6–1, 6–2

=== Doubles ===
(Portugal) Rui Machado / (Spain) Daniel Muñoz de la Nava def. (United States) James Cerretani / (Canada) Adil Shamasdin, 6–2, 6–3
