= 2010 Poznań Porsche Open – Doubles =

Doubles
- 2010 Poznań Porsche Open

Final
- Champions: (Portugal) Rui Machado (Spain) Daniel Muñoz de la Nava
- Runners-up: (United States) James Cerretani (Canada) Adil Shamasdin
- Score: 6–2, 6–3

Events
Singles	Doubles
← 2009 ·	Poznań Porsche Open	· 2011 →

Sergio Roitman and Alexandre Sidorenko were the defending champions. Roitman retired in 2009 and Sidorenko chose to not participate this year.
Rui Machado and Daniel Muñoz de la Nava defeated 1st-seeded James Cerretani and Adil Shamasdin 6–2, 6–3 in the final.

== Seeds ==
1. (United States) James Cerretani / (Canada) Adil Shamasdin (final)
2. (Poland) Tomasz Bednarek / (Germany) Frank Moser (quarterfinals)
3. (Brazil) Franco Ferreiro / (Argentina) Sebastián Prieto (first round)
4. (Jamaica) Dustin Brown / (Netherlands) Rogier Wassen (semifinals)

== Draw ==
=== Key ===
- Q = Qualifier
- WC = Wild card
- LL = Lucky loser
- Alt = Alternate
- SE = Special exempt
- PR = Protected ranking
- ITF = ITF entry
- JE = Junior exempt
- w/o = Walkover
- r = Retired
- d = Defaulted
- SR = Special ranking

=== Draw ===
First round
1	(United States) J Cerretani (Canada) A Shamasdin	7	6
(Czech Republic) J Minář (Czech Republic) D Škoch	5	4
(Italy) A Brizzi (Italy) S Vagnozzi	6	3	[10]
(Czech Republic) D Lojda (France) V Millot	0	6	[3]
4	(Jamaica) D Brown (Netherlands) R Wassen	3	6	[10]
(Germany) D Gremelmayr (Australia) R Junaid	6	4	[8]
WC	(Poland) G Panfil (Poland) Maciej Smoła	4	3
(France) J Dasnières de Veigy (Russia) A Kuznetsov	6	6
(Argentina) M Alund (Argentina) D Junqueira	6	6
WC	(Brazil) A Ghem (Spain) J Martí	1	4
(United States) B Battistone (India) H Mankad	5	6	[12]
3	(Brazil) F Ferreiro (Argentina) S Prieto	7	3	[10]
(Slovakia) P Červenák (Croatia) A Veić	3	2
(Portugal) R Machado (Spain) D Muñoz de la Nava	6	6
WC	(Poland) M Gawron (Poland) A Kapaś	2	4
2	(Poland) T Bednarek (Germany) F Moser	6	6

Quarterfinals
1	(United States) J Cerretani (Canada) A Shamasdin	6	6
(Italy) A Brizzi (Italy) S Vagnozzi	4	0
4	(Jamaica) D Brown (Netherlands) R Wassen	6	6
(France) J Dasnières de Veigy (Russia) A Kuznetsov	3	2
(Argentina) M Alund (Argentina) D Junqueira	3	7	[4]
(United States) B Battistone (India) H Mankad	6	5	[10]
(Portugal) R Machado (Spain) D Muñoz de la Nava	6	7
2	(Poland) T Bednarek (Germany) F Moser	2	6^{5}

Semifinals
1	(United States) J Cerretani (Canada) A Shamasdin	4	7	[10]
4	(Jamaica) D Brown (Netherlands) R Wassen	6	5	[9]
(United States) B Battistone (India) H Mankad	4	4
(Portugal) R Machado (Spain) D Muñoz de la Nava	6	6

Finals
1	(United States) J Cerretani (Canada) A Shamasdin	2	3
(Portugal) R Machado (Spain) D Muñoz de la Nava	6	6
