= 2012 Poznań Open – Doubles =

Doubles
- 2012 Poznań Open

Final
- Champions: (Australia) Rameez Junaid (Germany) Simon Stadler
- Runners-up: (Australia) Adam Hubble (Australia) Nima Roshan
- Score: 6–3, 6–4

Events
Singles	Doubles
← 2011 ·	Poznań Open	· 2013 →

Olivier Charroin and Stéphane Robert were the defending champions but decided not to participate that year.
Rameez Junaid and Simon Stadler won the final 6–3, 6–4 against Adam Hubble and Nima Roshan.

== Seeds ==
1. (Poland) Tomasz Bednarek / (Poland) Mateusz Kowalczyk (first round)
2. (Australia) Rameez Junaid / (Germany) Simon Stadler (champions)
3. (Romania) Andrei Dăescu / (Romania) Florin Mergea (semifinals)
4. (Spain) Arnau Brugués-Davi / (Spain) Gerard Granollers (semifinals)

== Draw ==
=== Key ===
- Q = Qualifier
- WC = Wild card
- LL = Lucky loser
- Alt = Alternate
- SE = Special exempt
- PR = Protected ranking
- ITF = ITF entry
- JE = Junior exempt
- w/o = Walkover
- r = Retired
- d = Defaulted
- SR = Special ranking

=== Draw ===
First round
1	(Poland) T Bednarek (Poland) M Kowalczyk	3	6	[11]
(Australia) A Hubble (Australia) N Roshan	6	3	[13]
(Slovakia) A Martin (Czech Republic) M Michalička	7^{9}	3	[3]
(Argentina) M Alund (Spain) J Martí	6^{7}	6	[10]
3	(Romania) A Dăescu (Romania) F Mergea	w/o
(Spain) I Cervantes Huegun (Spain) S Gutiérrez Ferrol
(Poland) M Gawron (Poland) A Kapaś	6	6
(Czech Republic) D Lojda (Czech Republic) J Mertl	2	0
WC	(Poland) Igor Bujdo (Poland) Mikołaj Jędruszczak	4	4
WC	(Poland) A Chadaj (Poland) M Przysiężny	6	6
(Poland) G Panfil (Czech Republic) D Škoch	7^{7}	3	[5]
4	(Spain) A Brugués-Davi (Spain) G Granollers	6^{4}	6	[10]
(Uruguay) A Behar (France) É Prodon	4	3
WC	(Poland) Piotr Gadomski (Poland) Maciej Smoła	6	6
(Chile) H Podlipnik (Netherlands) B Westerhof	2	0
2	(Australia) R Junaid (Germany) S Stadler	6	6

Quarterfinals
(Australia) A Hubble (Australia) N Roshan	6	6
(Argentina) M Alund (Spain) J Martí	1	1
3	(Romania) A Dăescu (Romania) F Mergea	6	7
(Poland) M Gawron (Poland) A Kapaś	3	5
WC	(Poland) A Chadaj (Poland) M Przysiężny	6^{2}	2
4	(Spain) A Brugués-Davi (Spain) G Granollers	7^{7}	6
WC	(Poland) P Gadomski (Poland) M Smoła	2	4
2	(Australia) R Junaid (Germany) S Stadler	6	6

Semifinals
(Australia) A Hubble (Australia) N Roshan	6	7^{7}
3	(Romania) A Dăescu (Romania) F Mergea	3	6^{3}
4	(Spain) A Brugués-Davi (Spain) G Granollers	4	3
2	(Australia) R Junaid (Germany) S Stadler	6	6

Final
(Australia) A Hubble (Australia) N Roshan	3	4
2	(Australia) R Junaid (Germany) S Stadler	6	6
