= 2011 Poznań Porsche Open – Doubles =

Doubles
- 2011 Poznań Porsche Open

Final
- Champions: (France) Olivier Charroin (France) Stéphane Robert
- Runners-up: (Brazil) Franco Ferreiro (Brazil) André Sá
- Score: 6–2, 6–3

Events
Singles	Doubles
← 2010 ·	Poznań Porsche Open	· 2012 →

Rui Machado and Daniel Muñoz-de la Nava were the defending champions, but decided not to participate.
Olivier Charroin and Stéphane Robert won the title after defeating Franco Ferreiro and André Sá 6–2, 6–3 in the final.

== Seeds ==
1. (Germany) Dustin Brown / (Canada) Adil Shamasdin (first round)
2. (Brazil) Franco Ferreiro / (Brazil) André Sá (final)
3. (Poland) Tomasz Bednarek / (Poland) Mateusz Kowalczyk (first round)
4. (France) Olivier Charroin / (France) Stéphane Robert (champions)

== Draw ==
=== Key ===
- Q = Qualifier
- WC = Wild card
- LL = Lucky loser
- Alt = Alternate
- SE = Special exempt
- PR = Protected ranking
- ITF = ITF entry
- JE = Junior exempt
- w/o = Walkover
- r = Retired
- d = Defaulted
- SR = Special ranking

=== Draw ===
First round
1	(Germany) D Brown (Canada) A Shamasdin	6	3	[5]
(Poland) M Gawron (Poland) G Panfil	4	6	[10]
(Czech Republic) Jan Mašík (Czech Republic) J Pospíšil	6	3	[8]
(Australia) C Ebelthite (Australia) S Kadir	4	6	[10]
4	(France) O Charroin (France) S Robert	6	6
(Finland) M Kontinen (Poland) Bartosz Sawicki	2	3
(France) A Gensse (France) N Renavand	6	0	[10]
(Poland) Piotr Gadomski (Poland) A Kapaś	2	6	[2]
(Italy) Andrea Arnaboldi (Argentina) A Molteni	4	4
(Czech Republic) D Lojda (Kazakhstan) Y Schukin	6	6
(Poland) J Janowicz (Poland) M Przysiężny	6	6
3	(Poland) T Bednarek (Poland) M Kowalczyk	4	4
(South Africa) J Coetzee (Sweden) A Siljeström	7^{9}	6
(Slovakia) K Čapkovič (Slovakia) I Klec	6^{7}	3
(Poland) Filip Rams (Poland) Kacper Rams	2	1
2	(Brazil) F Ferreiro (Brazil) A Sá	6	6

Quarterfinals
(Poland) M Gawron (Poland) G Panfil	2	2
(Australia) C Ebelthite (Australia) S Kadir	6	6
4	(France) O Charroin (France) S Robert	6	6
(France) A Gensse (France) N Renavand	2	4
(Czech Republic) D Lojda (Kazakhstan) Y Schukin	6	6
(Poland) J Janowicz (Poland) M Przysiężny	3	3
(South Africa) J Coetzee (Sweden) A Siljeström	6^{5}	3
2	(Brazil) F Ferreiro (Brazil) A Sá	7^{7}	6

Semifinals
(Australia) C Ebelthite (Australia) S Kadir	3	6^{3}
4	(France) O Charroin (France) S Robert	6	7^{7}
(Czech Republic) D Lojda (Kazakhstan) Y Schukin	1	6	[8]
2	(Brazil) F Ferreiro (Brazil) A Sá	6	4	[10]

Final
4	(France) O Charroin (France) S Robert	6	6
2	(Brazil) F Ferreiro (Brazil) A Sá	2	3
