= 2011 Poznań Porsche Open – Singles =

Singles
- 2011 Poznań Porsche Open

Final
- Champion: (Portugal) Rui Machado
- Runner-up: (Poland) Jerzy Janowicz
- Score: 6–3, 6–3

Events
Singles	Doubles
← 2010 ·	Poznań Porsche Open	· 2012 →

Denis Gremelmayr was the defending champion. Vincent Millot defeated him in the second round.
Rui Machado won the final 6–3, 6–3, against Jerzy Janowicz.

== Seeds ==
1. (Poland) Łukasz Kubot (second round, retired due to wrist injury)
2. (Portugal) Frederico Gil (first round)
3. (Portugal) Rui Machado (champion)
4. (France) Éric Prodon (second round)
5. (France) Stéphane Robert (semifinals)
6. (Germany) Dustin Brown (second round)
7. (Germany) Denis Gremelmayr (second round)
8. (Czech Republic) Jaroslav Pospíšil (second round)

== Draw ==
=== Key ===
- Q = Qualifier
- WC = Wild card
- LL = Lucky loser
- Alt = Alternate
- SE = Special exempt
- PR = Protected ranking
- ITF = ITF entry
- JE = Junior exempt
- w/o = Walkover
- r = Retired
- d = Defaulted
- SR = Special ranking

=== Finals ===
Semifinals
(Poland) Jerzy Janowicz	6	6
5	(France) Stéphane Robert	3	4
3	(Portugal) Rui Machado	7	7
(Kazakhstan) Yuri Schukin	6^{4}	5

Final
(Poland) Jerzy Janowicz	3	3
3	(Portugal) Rui Machado	6	6

=== Top half ===
First round
1/WC	(Poland) Ł Kubot	4	6	7^{7}
Q	(Slovakia) K Čapkovič	6	3	6^{5}
(Italy) M Crugnola	6	6
(Poland) M Przysiężny	3	4
(Poland) J Janowicz	6	6
(Argentina) A Molteni	1	4
Q	(France) N Renavand	6	3	6^{3}
8	(Czech Republic) J Pospíšil	3	6	7^{7}
4	(France) É Prodon	2	6	6
WC	(Poland) M Gawron	6	1	0
(France) A Gensse	6	7
(Argentina) JP Brzezicki	4	5
(Slovakia) I Klec	3	6	6^{5}
(Australia) P Luczak	6	4	7^{7}
(Germany) B Phau	6	1	5
5	(France) S Robert	4	6	7

Second round
1/WC	(Poland) Ł Kubot
(Italy) M Crugnola	w/o
(Poland) J Janowicz	6	6
8	(Czech Republic) J Pospíšil	3	4
4	(France) É Prodon	6	1	6^{8}
(France) A Gensse	2	6	7^{10}
(Australia) P Luczak	2	3
5	(France) S Robert	6	6

Quarterfinals
(Italy) M Crugnola	3	3
(Poland) J Janowicz	6	6
(France) A Gensse	3	2
5	(France) S Robert	6	6

Semifinals
(Poland) J Janowicz	6	6
5	(France) S Robert	3	4

=== Bottom half ===
First round
7	(Germany) D Gremelmayr	6	5	6
(Czech Republic) I Minář	1	7	4
(France) V Millot	6	0	6
Q	(Brazil) A Ghem	3	6	1
(Czech Republic) J Hájek	6	6
WC	(Poland) Piotr Gadomski	4	4
(Russia) T Gabashvili	4	4
3	(Portugal) R Machado	6	6
6	(Germany) D Brown	6	4	6
Q	(Poland) T Bednarek	3	6	4
(Germany) S Greul	3	2
(Czech Republic) D Lojda	6	6
WC	(Poland) Bartosz Sawicki	1	0
(Kazakhstan) Y Schukin	6	6
(Italy) Andrea Arnaboldi	6	6^{2}	6
2	(Portugal) F Gil	2	7^{7}	1

Second round
7	(Germany) D Gremelmayr	3	4
(France) V Millot	6	6
(Czech Republic) J Hájek	2	1
3	(Portugal) R Machado	6	6
6	(Germany) D Brown	7	4	3
(Czech Republic) D Lojda	5	6	6
(Kazakhstan) Y Schukin	6	6
(Italy) A Arnaboldi	4	3

Quarterfinals
(France) V Millot	6	2	1
3	(Portugal) R Machado	4	6	6
(Czech Republic) D Lojda	4	3
(Kazakhstan) Y Schukin	6	6

Semifinals
3	(Portugal) R Machado	7	7
(Kazakhstan) Y Schukin	6^{4}	5
