= 2010 Poznań Porsche Open – Singles =

Singles
- 2010 Poznań Porsche Open

Final
- Champion: (Germany) Denis Gremelmayr
- Runner-up: (Russia) Andrey Kuznetsov
- Score: 6–1, 6–2

Events
Singles	Doubles
← 2009 ·	Poznań Porsche Open	· 2011 →

Peter Luczak was the defending champion, but he was eliminated by Dušan Lojda in the quarterfinal.
Denis Gremelmayr won in the final 6–1, 6–2, against Andrey Kuznetsov.

== Seeds ==
1. (Australia) Peter Luczak (quarterfinals)
2. (Portugal) Frederico Gil (quarterfinals)
3. (Jamaica) Dustin Brown (first round)
4. (Portugal) Rui Machado (quarterfinals)
5. (Spain) Óscar Hernández (first round)
6. (Italy) Simone Vagnozzi (first round)
7. (Croatia) Antonio Veić (second round)
8. (Czech Republic) Dušan Lojda (semifinals)

== Draw ==
=== Key ===
- Q = Qualifier
- WC = Wild card
- LL = Lucky loser
- Alt = Alternate
- SE = Special exempt
- PR = Protected ranking
- ITF = ITF entry
- JE = Junior exempt
- w/o = Walkover
- r = Retired
- d = Defaulted
- SR = Special ranking

=== Finals ===
Semifinals
8	(Czech Republic) Dušan Lojda	3	6	6^{3}
(Russia) Andrey Kuznetsov	6	3	7
(Germany) Denis Gremelmayr	7	5	6
(Spain) Daniel Muñoz de la Nava	5	7	3

Final
(Russia) Andrey Kuznetsov	1	2
(Germany) Denis Gremelmayr	6	6

=== Top half ===
First round
1	(Australia) P Luczak	4	6	6
(Poland) J Janowicz	6	4	3
(Slovakia) P Červenák	6	6
WC	(Poland) Maciej Smoła	2	2
(Argentina) M Alund	6	6
Q	(Brazil) A Ghem	4	2
(Australia) R Junaid	2	7	6^{6}
8	(Czech Republic) D Lojda	6	6^{5}	7
4	(Portugal) R Machado	6	2	6
(Czech Republic) I Minář	2	6	4
(Italy) A Brizzi	6	6
(France) O Patience	2	3
(Chile) J Aguilar	5	1
(Russia) A Kuznetsov	7	6
WC	(Poland) M Gawron	7	5	4
7	(Croatia) A Veić	5	7	6

Second round
1	(Australia) P Luczak	6	7
(Slovakia) P Červenák	2	6^{2}
(Argentina) M Alund	0	1
8	(Czech Republic) D Lojda	6	6
4	(Portugal) R Machado	1	6	6
(Italy) A Brizzi	6	3	4
(Russia) A Kuznetsov	6	3	6
7	(Croatia) A Veić	4	6	2

Quarterfinals
1	(Australia) P Luczak	2	3
8	(Czech Republic) D Lojda	6	6
4	(Portugal) R Machado	2	7	3
(Russia) A Kuznetsov	6	5	6

Semifinals
8	(Czech Republic) D Lojda	3	6	6^{3}
(Russia) A Kuznetsov	6	3	7

=== Bottom half ===
First round
5	(Spain) Ó Hernández	3	5
(Germany) D Gremelmayr	6	7
WC	(Poland) A Kapaś	1	3
(Argentina) D Junqueira	6	6
(France) J Dasnières de Veigy	6	6
(France) V Millot	4	0
Q	(Poland) D Olejniczak	7	5	6
3	(Jamaica) D Brown	6^{3}	7	1
6	(Italy) S Vagnozzi	6	3	5
Q	(Czech Republic) R Vögeli	3	6	7
(Spain) D Muñoz de la Nava	3	6	6
Q	(Spain) J Martí	6	2	1
(Slovakia) A Martin	6	6
WC	(Poland) G Panfil	2	0
(Czech Republic) J Minář	6	1	4
2	(Portugal) F Gil	3	6	6

Second round
(Germany) D Gremelmayr	6	6
(Argentina) D Junqueira	2	4
(France) J Dasnières de Veigy	7	6
Q	(Poland) D Olejniczak	6^{3}	2
Q	(Czech Republic) R Vögeli	2	2
(Spain) D Muñoz de la Nava	6	6
(Slovakia) A Martin	1	2
2	(Portugal) F Gil	6	6

Quarterfinals
(Germany) D Gremelmayr	6	6
(France) J Dasnières de Veigy	2	2
(Spain) D Muñoz de la Nava	6	6^{4}	6
2	(Portugal) F Gil	1	7	4

Semifinals
(Germany) D Gremelmayr	7	5	6
(Spain) D Muñoz de la Nava	5	7	3
