= 2009 Poznań Porsche Open – Singles =

Singles
- 2009 Poznań Porsche Open

Final
- Champion: (Australia) Peter Luczak
- Runner-up: (Kazakhstan) Yuri Schukin
- Score: 3–6, 7–6^{(7–4)}, 7–6^{(8–6)}

Events
Singles	Doubles
← 2008 ·	Poznań Porsche Open	· 2010 →

Nicolas Devilder was the defending champion, but he did not participate that year.

Peter Luczak won the title, defeating Yuri Schukin in the final, 3–6, 7–6^{(7–4)}, 7–6^{(8–6)}.

== Seeds ==
1. (Chile) Paul Capdeville (first round)
2. (Chile) Nicolás Massú (second round)
3. (Spain) Rubén Ramírez Hidalgo (second round)
4. (Argentina) Sergio Roitman (first round)
5. (Portugal) Rui Machado (second round)
6. (Germany) Denis Gremelmayr (quarterfinals)
7. (Australia) Peter Luczak (champion)
8. (France) Laurent Recouderc (quarterfinals)

== Draw ==
=== Key ===
- Q = Qualifier
- WC = Wild card
- LL = Lucky loser
- Alt = Alternate
- SE = Special exempt
- PR = Protected ranking
- ITF = ITF entry
- JE = Junior exempt
- w/o = Walkover
- r = Retired
- d = Defaulted
- SR = Special ranking

=== Final four ===
Semifinals
7	(Australia) Peter Luczak	6	6
WC	(Poland) Jerzy Janowicz	4	2
Alt	(Kazakhstan) Yuri Schukin	7	6
Q	(Ukraine) Oleksandr Dolgopolov Jr.	6^{5}	4

Final
7	(Australia) Peter Luczak	3	7	7
Alt	(Kazakhstan) Yuri Schukin	6	6^{4}	6^{6}

=== Top half ===
First round
1	(Chile) P Capdeville	6	6^{5}	5
(Sweden) B Rehnquist	1	7	7
(Argentina) JP Brzezicki	6^{3}	3
LL	(Spain) I Coll Riudavets	7	6
(Czech Republic) J Vaněk	1	6	1
Q	(Poland) M Przysiężny	6	3	6
(Czech Republic) L Rosol	2	3
7	(Australia) P Luczak	6	6
3	(Spain) R Ramírez Hidalgo	6	7
(Czech Republic) J Hájek	1	6^{2}
WC	(Poland) J Janowicz	6	6
Q	(Poland) A Chadaj	1	2
WC	(Poland) M Gawron	6	6
(Spain) D Muñoz de la Nava	4	3
(Croatia) I Dodig	3	4
8	(France) L Recouderc	6	6

Second round
(Sweden) B Rehnquist	6	6
LL	(Spain) I Coll Riudavets	4	1
Q	(Poland) M Przysiężny	6^{4}	6	1
7	(Australia) P Luczak	7	4	6
3	(Spain) R Ramírez Hidalgo	4	2
WC	(Poland) J Janowicz	6	6
WC	(Poland) M Gawron	6	2	3
8	(France) L Recouderc	2	6	6

Quarterfinals
(Sweden) B Rehnquist	4	3
7	(Australia) P Luczak	6	6
WC	(Poland) J Janowicz	7	6
8	(France) L Recouderc	6^{4}	3

Semifinals
7	(Australia) P Luczak	6	6
WC	(Poland) J Janowicz	4	2

=== Bottom half ===
First round
5	(Portugal) R Machado	6	6
WC	(Argentina) G Gaudio	2	4
(Croatia) A Veić	7	4	6
(Spain) P Santos	6^{5}	6	4
Alt	(Kazakhstan) Y Schukin	6	6
(Slovakia) K Čapkovič	3	1
Q	(Slovakia) M Kližan	6	6
4	(Argentina) S Roitman	3	3
6	(Germany) D Gremelmayr	7	6
LL	(Spain) A Vivanco-Guzmán	6^{4}	3
WC	(Poland) A Kapaś	0	2
(Italy) M Crugnola	6	6
Q	(Ukraine) O Dolgopolov Jr.	6^{3}	6	6
(France) A Sidorenko	7	3	0
(Spain) D Marrero	3	3
2	(Chile) N Massú	6	6

Second round
5	(Portugal) R Machado	3	6	5
(Croatia) A Veić	6	3	7
Alt	(Kazakhstan) Y Schukin	7	7
Q	(Slovakia) M Kližan	5	6^{4}
6	(Germany) D Gremelmayr	6	3
(Italy) M Crugnola	1	0^{r}
Q	(Ukraine) O Dolgopolov Jr.	6	2
2	(Chile) N Massú	1	0^{r}

Quarterfinals
(Croatia) A Veić	3	2
Alt	(Kazakhstan) Y Schukin	6	6
6	(Germany) D Gremelmayr	5	4
Q	(Ukraine) O Dolgopolov Jr.	7	6

Semifinals
Alt	(Kazakhstan) Y Schukin	7	6
Q	(Ukraine) O Dolgopolov Jr.	6^{5}	4
