= 2012 Poznań Open – Singles =

Singles
- 2012 Poznań Open

Final
- Champion: (Poland) Jerzy Janowicz
- Runner-up: (France) Jonathan Dasnières de Veigy
- Score: 6–3, 6–3

Events
| Singles | Doubles |
- Poznań Open

Rui Machado was the defending champion but decided not to participate that year.
Jerzy Janowicz won the final 6–3, 6–3 against Jonathan Dasnières de Veigy.

== Seeds ==
1. (Poland) Jerzy Janowicz (champion)
2. (France) Éric Prodon (quarterfinals)
3. (Spain) Íñigo Cervantes Huegun (second round, retired due to back injury)
4. (France) Guillaume Rufin (first round)
5. (France) Jonathan Dasnières de Veigy (final)
6. (Argentina) Martín Alund (semifinals)
7. (Austria) Andreas Haider-Maurer (semifinals)
8. (Spain) Arnau Brugués Davi (quarterfinals)

== Draw ==
Key

- Q = Qualifier
- WC = Wild card
- LL = Lucky loser
- Alt = Alternate
- ITF = ITF entry
- PR = Protected ranking
- SR = Special ranking
- SE = Special exempt
- JE = Junior exempt
- JR = Junior Accelerator Programme entrant
- CO = College Accelerator Programme entrant
- NG = Next Gen Accelerator Program entrant
- w/o = Walkover
- r = Retired
- d = Defaulted

=== Finals ===
Semifinals
1 | (Poland) Jerzy Janowicz | 6 | 5 | 6
7 | (Austria) Andreas Haider-Maurer | 4 | 7 | 4
6 | (Argentina) Martín Alund | 6^{1} | 4
5 | (France) Jonathan Dasnières de Veigy | 7^{7} | 6

Final
1 | (Poland) Jerzy Janowicz | 6 | 6
5 | (France) Jonathan Dasnières de Veigy | 3 | 3

=== Top half ===
First round
1 | (Poland) J Janowicz | 6 | 7^{7}
WC | (Poland) Piotr Gadomski | 4 | 6^{4}
(Czech Republic) M Michalička | 6 | 6
(Ukraine) I Sergeyev | 3 | 1
(Spain) J Martí | 6^{3} | 6 | 7^{7}
WC | (Poland) Maciej Smoła | 7^{7} | 4 | 6^{3}
WC | (Poland) A Kapaś | 7^{7} | 6^{3} | 4
8 | (Spain) A Brugués Davi | 6^{2} | 7^{7} | 6
4 | (France) G Rufin | 6^{4} | 6 | 5
WC | (Poland) M Przysiężny | 7^{7} | 3 | 7
(Czech Republic) J Mertl | 6 | 3 | 4
(Belarus) U Ignatik | 4 | 6 | 6
(Romania) V Crivoi | 7^{7} | 5 | 1
(Spain) S Gutiérrez Ferrol | 6^{5} | 7 | 6
(Spain) G Granollers | 4 | 3
7 | (Austria) A Haider-Maurer | 6 | 6

Second round
1 | (Poland) J Janowicz | 6 | 6
(Czech Republic) M Michalička | 4 | 4
(Spain) J Martí | 7^{7} | 2 | 2
8 | (Spain) A Brugués Davi | 6^{2} | 6 | 6
WC | (Poland) M Przysiężny | 0 | 0^{r}
(Belarus) U Ignatik | 6 | 3
(Spain) S Gutiérrez Ferrol | 3 | 2
7 | (Austria) A Haider-Maurer | 6 | 6

Quarterfinals
1 | (Poland) J Janowicz | 6 | 6
8 | (Spain) A Brugués Davi | 3 | 4
(Belarus) U Ignatik | 6 | 4 | 6^{5}
7 | (Austria) A Haider-Maurer | 2 | 6 | 7^{7}

Semifinals
1 | (Poland) J Janowicz | 6 | 5 | 6
7 | (Austria) A Haider-Maurer | 4 | 7 | 4

=== Bottom half ===
First round
6 | (Argentina) M Alund | 6 | 6^{3} | 7
(Chile) H Podlipnik | 2 | 7^{7} | 5
(France) A Michon | 6 | 7
(Slovakia) A Martin | 3 | 5
Q | (Poland) M Gawron | 4 | 6 | 6
(Hungary) A Balázs | 6 | 0 | 2
Q | (Sweden) P Rosenholm | 1^{r}
3 | (Spain) I Cervantes Huegun | 6
5 | (France) J Dasnières de Veigy | 7 | 3 | 6
(Italy) Enrico Burzi | 5 | 6 | 3
(Brazil) G Clezar | 4 | 3
(Czech Republic) D Lojda | 6 | 6
Q | (Poland) G Panfil | 2 | 6^{2}
(Netherlands) B Westerhof | 6 | 7^{7}
Q | (Sweden) M Ryderstedt | 5 | 4
2 | (France) É Prodon | 7 | 6

Second round
6 | (Argentina) M Alund | 6 | 6
(France) A Michon | 4 | 4
Q | (Poland) M Gawron | 7 | 3
3 | (Spain) I Cervantes Huegun | 5 | 0^{r}
5 | (France) J Dasnières de Veigy | 7^{7} | 6
(Czech Republic) D Lojda | 6^{5} | 2
(Netherlands) B Westerhof | 4 | 3
2 | (France) É Prodon | 6 | 6

Quarterfinals
6 | (Argentina) M Alund | 5 | 6 | 6
Q | (Poland) M Gawron | 7 | 4 | 4
5 | (France) J Dasnières de Veigy | 6 | 7
2 | (France) É Prodon | 4 | 5

Semifinals
6 | (Argentina) M Alund | 6^{1} | 4
5 | (France) J Dasnières de Veigy | 7^{7} | 6
