= 2012 Poznań Open =

- Date: 14 – 22 July
- Edition: 9th
- Draw: 32S/23Q/16D
- Prize money: €30,000+H
- Surface: Clay
- Location: Poznań, Poland
- Venue: Park Tenisowy Olimpia

Champions

Singles
- (Poland) Jerzy Janowicz

Doubles
- (Australia) Rameez Junaid / (Germany) Simon Stadler
← 2011 ·	Poznań Open	· 2013 →

The 2012 Poznań Open was a professional tennis tournament played on clay courts. It was the ninth edition of the tournament which was part of the 2012 ATP Challenger Tour. It took place at the Park Tenisowy Olimpia in Poznań, Poland from 14 to 22 July 2012, including the qualifying competition in the first two days.

== Singles main draw entrants ==
=== Seeds ===
Country	Player	Rank	Seed
POL	Jerzy Janowicz	109	1
FRA	Éric Prodon	121	2
ESP	Iñigo Cervantes Huegun	133	3
FRA	Guillaume Rufin	142	4
FRA	Jonathan Dasnières de Veigy	152	5
ARG	Martín Alund	153	6
AUT	Andreas Haider-Maurer	159	7
ESP	Arnau Brugués-Davi	171	8

=== Other entrants ===
The following players received wildcards into the singles main draw:

- (Poland) Piotr Gadomski
- (Poland) Andriej Kapaś
- (Poland) Michał Przysiężny
- (Poland) Maciej Smoła

The following players received entry from the qualifying draw:

- (Poland) Marcin Gawron
- (Poland) Grzegorz Panfil
- (Sweden) Patrik Rosenholm
- (Sweden) Michael Ryderstedt

=== Withdrawals ===
Before the tournament

- (Portugal) Pedro Sousa

== Doubles main draw entrants ==
=== Seeds ===
Country	Player	Country	Player	Rank	Seed
POL	Tomasz Bednarek	POL	Mateusz Kowalczyk	225	1
AUS	Rameez Junaid	GER	Simon Stadler	313	2
ROU	Andrei Dăescu	ROU	Florin Mergea	325	3
ESP	Arnau Brugués-Davi	ESP	Gerard Granollers	422	4

=== Other entrants ===
The following pairs received wildcards into the doubles main draw:

- (Poland) Igor Bujdo / (Poland) Mikołaj Jędruszczak
- (Poland) Adam Chadaj / (Poland) Michał Przysiężny
- (Poland) Piotr Gadomski / (Poland) Maciej Smoła

== Champions ==
=== Singles ===
(Poland) Jerzy Janowicz def. (France) Jonathan Dasnières de Veigy, 6–3, 6–3

=== Doubles ===
(Australia) Rameez Junaid / (Germany) Simon Stadler def. (Australia) Adam Hubble / (Australia) Nima Roshan, 6–3, 6–4
