= 2011 Pekao Szczecin Open =

- Date: 12–18 September
- Edition: 19th
- Location: Szczecin, Poland

Champions

Singles
- (Portugal) Rui Machado

Doubles
- (Poland) Marcin Gawron / (Poland) Andriej Kapaś
- Pekao Szczecin Open

The 2011 Pekao Szczecin Open was a professional tennis tournament played on clay courts. It was the 19th edition of the tournament which was part of the Tretorn SERIE+ of the 2011 ATP Challenger Tour. It took place in Szczecin, Poland between 12 and 18 September 2011.

== ATP entrants ==
=== Seeds ===
Country	Player	Rank^{1}	Seed
ESP	Albert Montañés	42	1
ROU	Victor Hănescu	72	2
POR	Rui Machado	79	3
FRA	Éric Prodon	88	4
BRA	João Souza	90	5
KAZ	Andrey Golubev	98	6
ARG	Horacio Zeballos	112	7
GER	Dustin Brown	116	8

- ^{1} Rankings are as of August 29, 2011.

=== Other entrants ===
The following players received wildcards into the singles main draw:

- (Poland) Piotr Gadomski
- (Poland) Andriej Kapaś
- (Poland) Arkadiusz Kocyła
- (Spain) Albert Montañés

The following players received entry from the qualifying draw:

- (Bulgaria) Tihomir Grozdanov
- (Argentina) Renzo Olivo
- (France) Olivier Patience
- (Poland) Michał Przysiężny

== Champions ==
=== Singles ===
(Portugal) Rui Machado def. (France) Éric Prodon, 2–6, 7–5, 6–2

=== Doubles ===
(Poland) Marcin Gawron / (Poland) Andriej Kapaś def. (Kazakhstan) Andrey Golubev / (Kazakhstan) Yuri Schukin, 6–3, 6–4
