= 2011 Pekao Szczecin Open – Singles =

Singles
- 2011 Pekao Szczecin Open

Final
- Champion: (Portugal) Rui Machado
- Runner-up: (France) Éric Prodon
- Score: 2–6, 7–5, 6–2

Events
Singles	Doubles
- Pekao Szczecin Open

Pablo Cuevas was the defending champion but decided not to participate.

Rui Machado won the tournament after defeating Éric Prodon 2–6, 7–5, 6–2 in the final. Due to rain, the final was played on Sunday, 18 September 2011 and Monday, 19 September.

== Seeds ==
1. (Spain) Albert Montañés (semifinals)
2. (Romania) Victor Hănescu (first round)
3. (Portugal) Rui Machado (champion)
4. (France) Éric Prodon (final)
5. (Brazil) João Souza (quarterfinals)
6. (Kazakhstan) Andrey Golubev (second round)
7. (Argentina) Horacio Zeballos (quarterfinals)
8. (Germany) Dustin Brown (first round)

== Draw ==
Key

- Q = Qualifier
- WC = Wild card
- LL = Lucky loser
- Alt = Alternate
- ITF = ITF entry
- PR = Protected ranking
- SR = Special ranking
- SE = Special exempt
- JE = Junior exempt
- JR = Junior Accelerator Programme entrant
- CO = College Accelerator Programme entrant
- NG = Next Gen Accelerator Program entrant
- w/o = Walkover
- r = Retired
- d = Defaulted

=== Finals ===
Semifinals
1/WC	(Spain) Albert Montañés	2	6	0
3	(Portugal) Rui Machado	6	0	6
4	(France) Éric Prodon	6	6
(Spain) Daniel Muñoz de la Nava	4	3

Final
3	(Portugal) Rui Machado	2	7	6
4	(France) Éric Prodon	6	5	2

=== Top half ===
First round
1/WC	(Spain) A Montañés	7^{9}	6^{10}	6
WC	(Poland) Andriej Kapaś	6^{7}	7^{12}	3
(Germany) Alexander Flock	2	6	6
(France) F Serra	6	4	2
(France) Axel Michon	6	1	7
Q	(Poland) M Przysiężny	2	6	5
WC	(Poland) Arkadiusz Kocyła	6	5	3
5	(Brazil) J Souza	3	7	6
3	(Portugal) R Machado	6	6
(Kazakhstan) Y Schukin	1	2
(France) G Rufin	6	6
(Germany) S Greul	3	4
(Moldova) R Albot	7	4	5
(Poland) M Gawron	5	6	7
(Germany) B Phau	1	1
7	(Argentina) H Zeballos	6	6

Second round
1/WC	(Spain) A Montañés	4	6	6
(Germany) A Flock	6	0	0
(France) A Michon	5	7^{7}	1
5	(Brazil) J Souza	7	6^{4}	6
3	(Portugal) R Machado	6	6
(France) G Rufin	3	0
(Poland) M Gawron	1	6^{5}
7	(Argentina) H Zeballos	6	7^{7}

Quarterfinals
1/WC	(Spain) A Montañés	4	6	6
5	(Brazil) J Souza	6	3	1
3	(Portugal) R Machado	6	6
7	(Argentina) H Zeballos	1	4

Semifinals
1/WC	(Spain) A Montañés	2	6	0
3	(Portugal) R Machado	6	0	6

=== Bottom half ===
First round
5	(Kazakhstan) A Golubev	6	5	6
Q	(France) O Patience	2	7	2
(Germany) B Knittel	2	6	1
(Argentina) F Delbonis	6	4	6
(Netherlands) T Schoorel	6	6
WC	(Poland) Piotr Gadomski	3	4
(Germany) A Beck	7	6^{3}	3
4	(France) É Prodon	5	7^{7}	6
8	(Germany) D Brown	7^{9}	4	4
(Italy) A Giannessi	6^{7}	6	6
(Russia) E Donskoy	6	6
(Portugal) J Sousa	3	3
(Spain) D Muñoz de la Nava	6	6
Q	(Argentina) R Olivo	2	3
Q	(Bulgaria) T Grozdanov	6	3	6
2	(Romania) V Hănescu	4	6	1

Second round
5	(Kazakhstan) A Golubev	6^{2}	4
(Argentina) F Delbonis	7^{7}	6
(Netherlands) T Schoorel	2	5
4	(France) É Prodon	6	7
(Italy) A Giannessi	2	6	7
(Russia) E Donskoy	6	3	5
(Spain) D Muñoz de la Nava	6	6
Q	(Bulgaria) T Grozdanov	2	1

Quarterfinals
(Argentina) F Delbonis	5	2
4	(France) É Prodon	7	6
(Italy) A Giannessi	4	2
(Spain) D Muñoz de la Nava	6	6

Semifinals
4	(France) É Prodon	6	6
(Spain) D Muñoz de la Nava	4	3
