= 2011 Pekao Szczecin Open – Doubles =

Doubles
- 2011 Pekao Szczecin Open

Final
- Champions: (Poland) Marcin Gawron (Poland) Andriej Kapaś
- Runners-up: (Kazakhstan) Andrey Golubev (Kazakhstan) Yuri Schukin
- Score: 6–3, 6–4

Events
Singles	Doubles
- Pekao Szczecin Open

Dustin Brown and Rogier Wassen were the defending champions but they decided not to participate together.
Wassen played alongside Björn Phau, while Brown partnered up with Ken Skupski. They all were eliminated in the quarterfinals.

Marcin Gawron and Andriej Kapaś won this tournament. They defeated Andrey Golubev and Yuri Schukin 6–3, 6–4 in the final.

== Seeds ==
1. (Austria) Julian Knowle / (Canada) Adil Shamasdin (first round)
2. (Germany) Dustin Brown / (United Kingdom) Ken Skupski (quarterfinals)
3. (Germany) Martin Emmrich / (Sweden) Andreas Siljeström (quarterfinals)
4. (Germany) Björn Phau / (Netherlands) Rogier Wassen (quarterfinals)

== Draw ==
Key

- Q = Qualifier
- WC = Wild card
- LL = Lucky loser
- Alt = Alternate
- ITF = ITF entry
- PR = Protected ranking
- SR = Special ranking
- SE = Special exempt
- JE = Junior exempt
- JR = Junior Accelerator Programme entrant
- CO = College Accelerator Programme entrant
- NG = Next Gen Accelerator Program entrant
- w/o = Walkover
- r = Retired
- d = Defaulted

=== Draw ===
First round
1	(Austria) J Knowle (Canada) A Shamasdin	6	0	[7]
(Moldova) R Albot (Spain) D Muñoz-de la Nava	3	6	[10]
(Russia) E Donskoy (Portugal) J Sousa	6	6
(Italy) A Giannessi (Russia) Alexander Rumyantsev	3	4
4	(Germany) B Phau (Netherlands) R Wassen	6	7^{7}
(Poland) Piotr Gadomski (Poland) M Kowalczyk	3	6^{2}
(Kazakhstan) A Golubev (Kazakhstan) Y Schukin	6	6
WC	(Poland) A Chadaj (Poland) Paweł Cias	3	4
(Australia) A Feeney (Czech Republic) D Škoch	3	3
(Portugal) R Machado (Brazil) J Souza	6	6
(Poland) T Bednarek (Poland) M Przysiężny	6^{3}	5
3	(Germany) M Emmrich (Sweden) A Siljeström	7^{7}	7
(Germany) S Greul (Germany) B Knittel	5	1
WC	(Poland) M Gawron (Poland) A Kapaś	7	6
WC	(Poland) Arkadiusz Kocyła (Poland) Mikołaj Szmyrgała	4	2
2	(Germany) D Brown (United Kingdom) K Skupski	6	6

Quarterfinals
(Moldova) R Albot (Spain) D Muñoz-de la Nava	6	3	[10]
(Russia) E Donskoy (Portugal) J Sousa	2	6	[3]
4	(Germany) B Phau (Netherlands) R Wassen	3	5
(Kazakhstan) A Golubev (Kazakhstan) Y Schukin	6	7
(Portugal) R Machado (Brazil) J Souza	6	6
3	(Germany) M Emmrich (Sweden) A Siljeström	3	4
WC	(Poland) M Gawron (Poland) A Kapaś	7^{7}	7
2	(Germany) D Brown (United Kingdom) K Skupski	6^{5}	5

Semifinals
(Moldova) R Albot (Spain) D Muñoz-de la Nava	4	7	[5]
(Kazakhstan) A Golubev (Kazakhstan) Y Schukin	6	5	[10]
(Portugal) R Machado (Brazil) J Souza	6	4	[7]
WC	(Poland) M Gawron (Poland) A Kapaś	4	6	[10]

Final
(Kazakhstan) A Golubev (Kazakhstan) Y Schukin	4	3
WC	(Poland) M Gawron (Poland) A Kapaś	6	6
