= 2009 Poznań Porsche Open – Doubles =

Doubles
- 2009 Poznań Porsche Open

Final
- Champions: (Argentina) Sergio Roitman (France) Alexandre Sidorenko
- Runners-up: (Germany) Michael Kohlmann (Netherlands) Rogier Wassen
- Score: 6–4, 6–4

Events
| Singles | Doubles |
- Poznań Porsche Open

Johan Brunström and Jean-Julien Rojer were the defending champions; however, they chose to participate in ATP World Tour 500 series tournament in Hamburg instead.

Sergio Roitman and Alexandre Sidorenko won the title, defeating Michael Kohlmann and Rogier Wassen in the final, 6–4, 6–4.

== Seeds ==
1. (Germany) Michael Kohlmann / (Netherlands) Rogier Wassen (final)
2. (Spain) David Marrero / (Spain) Rubén Ramírez Hidalgo (quarterfinals)
3. (Germany) Philipp Marx / (Italy) Alessandro Motti (quarterfinals)
4. (United Kingdom) Jamie Delgado / (United Kingdom) Jamie Murray (first round)

== Draw ==
Key

- Q = Qualifier
- WC = Wild card
- LL = Lucky loser
- Alt = Alternate
- ITF = ITF entry
- PR = Protected ranking
- SR = Special ranking
- SE = Special exempt
- JE = Junior exempt
- JR = Junior Accelerator Programme entrant
- CO = College Accelerator Programme entrant
- NG = Next Gen Accelerator Program entrant
- w/o = Walkover
- r = Retired
- d = Defaulted

=== Draw ===
First round
1 | (Germany) M Kohlmann (Netherlands) R Wassen | 7 | 3 | [10]
(Italy) Fabio Colangelo (Italy) M Crugnola | 6^{3} | 6 | [5]
(Jamaica) D Brown (Australia) R Junaid | 2 | 6 | [10]
(Poland) J Janowicz (Poland) M Kowalczyk | 6 | 3 | [5]
3 | (Germany) P Marx (Italy) A Motti | 6 | 3 | [10]
WC | (Poland) T Bednarek (Poland) M Przysiężny | 4 | 6 | [8]
(Portugal) R Machado (Spain) P Santos | 6^{2} | 2
(Australia) P Luczak (United States) R Rizza | 7 | 6
WC | (Poland) K Owsian (Poland) J Piter | 3 | 6^{5}
(Czech Republic) Dušan Karol (Romania) F Mergea | 6 | 7
WC | (Poland) M Gawron (Poland) A Kapaś | 6 | 6
4 | (United Kingdom) J Delgado (United Kingdom) J Murray | 4 | 4
(Argentina) S Roitman (France) A Sidorenko | 6 | 7
(Kazakhstan) Y Schukin (Russia) D Sitak | 3 | 5
(Slovakia) K Čapkovič (Slovakia) M Kližan | 2 | 6^{6}
2 | (Spain) D Marrero (Spain) R Ramírez Hidalgo | 6 | 7

Quarterfinals
1 | (Germany) M Kohlmann (Netherlands) R Wassen | 6 | 6
(Jamaica) D Brown (Australia) R Junaid | 4 | 3
3 | (Germany) P Marx (Italy) A Motti | 6 | 4 | [2]
(Australia) P Luczak (United States) R Rizza | 2 | 6 | [10]
(Czech Republic) D Karol (Romania) F Mergea | 4 | 2
(Poland) M Gawron (Poland) A Kapaś | 6 | 6
(Argentina) S Roitman (France) A Sidorenko | 6 | 6
2 | (Spain) D Marrero (Spain) R Ramírez Hidalgo | 2 | 4

Semifinals
1 | (Germany) M Kohlmann (Netherlands) R Wassen | 6 | 7
(Australia) P Luczak (United States) R Rizza | 5 | 6^{6}
(Poland) M Gawron (Poland) A Kapaś | 2 | 3
(Argentina) S Roitman (France) A Sidorenko | 6 | 6

Finals
1 | (Germany) M Kohlmann (Netherlands) R Wassen | 4 | 4
(Argentina) S Roitman (France) A Sidorenko | 6 | 6
