= 2011 Poznań Porsche Open =

Tennis competition

- Date: 16–24 July
- Edition: 8th
- Category: Tretorn SERIE+
- Draw: 32S/27Q/16D
- Prize money: €85,000+H
- Surface: Clay
- Location: Poznań, Poland
- Venue: Park Tenisowy Olimpia

Champions

Singles
- (Portugal) Rui Machado

Doubles
- (France) Olivier Charroin / (France) Stéphane Robert
← 2010 ·	Poznań Porsche Open	· 2012 →

The 2011 Poznań Porsche Open powered by Enea was a professional tennis tournament played on clay courts. It was the eighth edition of the tournament which was part of the 2011 ATP Challenger Tour and the Tretorn SERIE+ tour. It took place at the Park Tenisowy Olimpia in Poznań, Poland from 16 to 24 July 2011, including the qualifying competition in the first two days.

== Singles main draw entrants ==
=== Seeds ===
Country	Player	Rank	Seed
POL	Łukasz Kubot	69	1
POR	Frederico Gil	91	2
POR	Rui Machado	94	3
FRA	Éric Prodon	103	4
FRA	Stéphane Robert	107	5
GER	Dustin Brown	125	6
GER	Denis Gremelmayr	128	7
CZE	Jaroslav Pospíšil	131	8

=== Other entrants ===
The following players received wildcards into the singles main draw:

- (Poland) Piotr Gadomski
- (Poland) Marcin Gawron
- (Poland) Łukasz Kubot
- (Poland) Bartosz Sawicki

The following players received entry from the qualifying draw:

- (Poland) Tomasz Bednarek
- (Slovakia) Kamil Čapkovič
- (Brazil) André Ghem
- (France) Nicolas Renavand

=== Withdrawals ===
Before the tournament

- (France) Marc Gicquel
- (Spain) Daniel Muñoz de la Nava
- (Spain) Rubén Ramírez Hidalgo
- (France) Maxime Teixeira

== Doubles main draw entrants ==
=== Seeds ===
Country	Player	Country	Player	Rank	Seed
GER	Dustin Brown	CAN	Adil Shamasdin	117	1
BRA	Franco Ferreiro	BRA	André Sá	139	2
POL	Tomasz Bednarek	POL	Mateusz Kowalczyk	280	3
FRA	Olivier Charroin	FRA	Stéphane Robert	316	4

== Champions ==
=== Singles ===
(Portugal) Rui Machado def. (Poland) Jerzy Janowicz, 6–3, 6–3

=== Doubles ===
(France) Olivier Charroin / (France) Stéphane Robert def. (Brazil) Franco Ferreiro / (Brazil) André Sá, 6–2, 6–3
