= Poznań Open =

- 2025 Poznań Open

ATP Challenger Tour
- Event name: Enea Poznań Open
- Location: Poznań, Poland
- Venue: Park Tenisowy Olimpia
- Category: ATP Challenger Tour 100 (2023, 2025-), Challenger Tour (-2022, 2024)
- Surface: Clay (red)
- Draw: 32S/32Q/16D
- Prize money: €145,250 (2025), 64,000+H (2024)
- Website: eneapoznanopen.pl

Current champions (2026)
- Singles: (Brazil) Gustavo Heide
- Doubles: (Spain) Sergio Martos Gornés (Poland) Szymon Walków

The Enea Poznań Open is a professional tennis tournament played on outdoor red clay courts. It is currently part of the Association of Tennis Professionals (ATP) Challenger Tour. It has been held annually at the Park Tenisowy Olimpia in Poznań, Poland, since 2004. The tournament is regarded as a continuation of the Polish Open, which was relocated from Warsaw to Poznań and held for nine consecutive years between 1992 and 2000. In 2023 it was a Challenger 100. In 2025 it was upgraded again to a Challenger 100.

== Naming ==
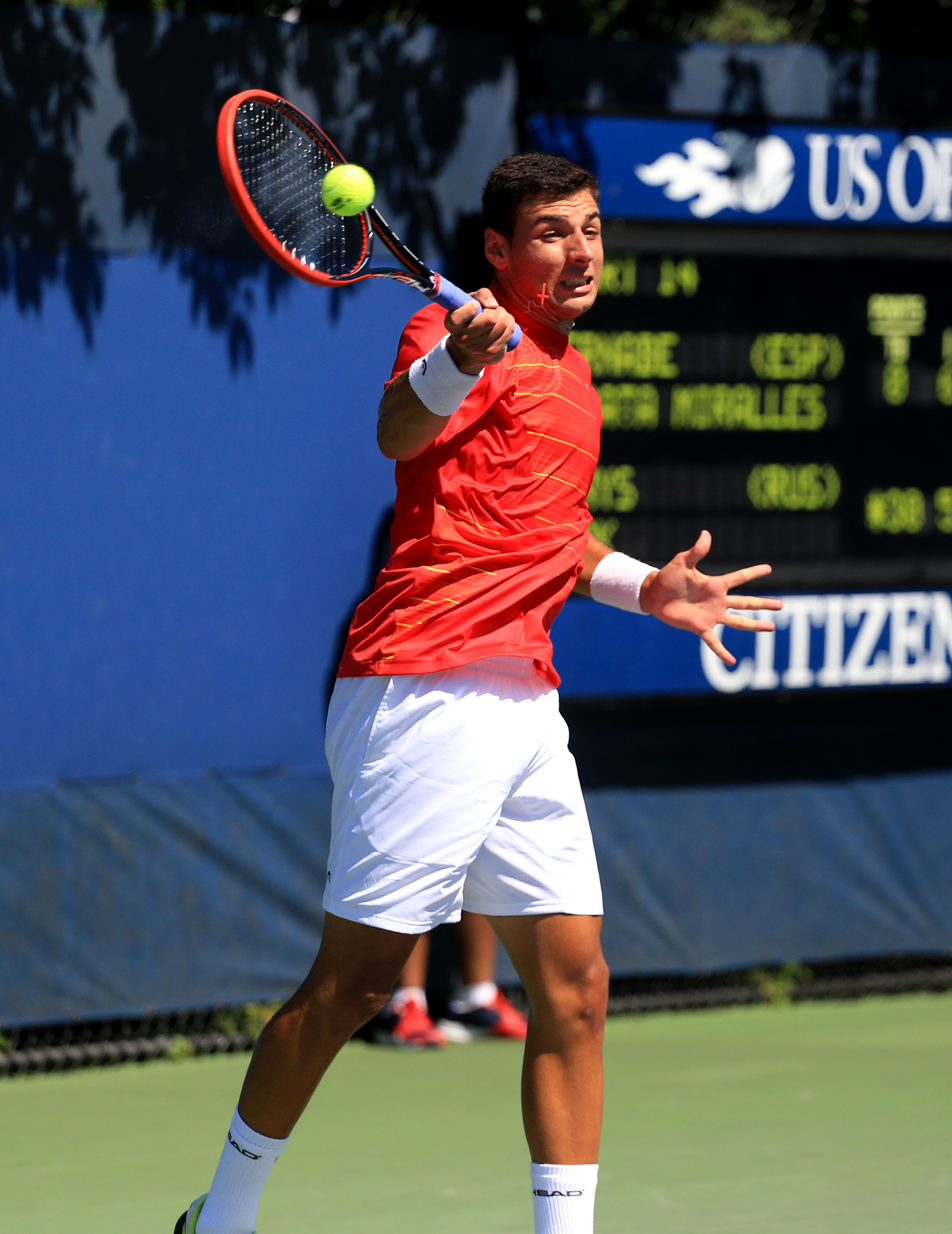
Spaniard Bernabé Zapata Miralles is the current Poznań Open singles champion

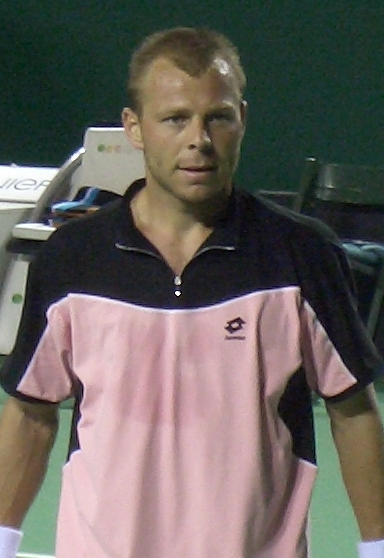
Czech Tomáš Zíb was the first player to win the singles in 2004

Since the incorporation of the tournament for seven consecutive editions – until 2010 it has been known as the Poznań Porsche Open and the following year as Poznań Porsche Open powered by Enea due to sponsorship reasons. In 2012 the only major sponsor of the tournament was the City of Poznań, so it was then renamed the Poznań Open. Starting in 2023 it was again referred as the Enea Poznań Open.

== Past finals ==
=== Singles ===
Year	Champion	Runner-up	Score
2026	(Brazil) Gustavo Heide	(Argentina) Facundo Díaz Acosta	6–2, 6–2
2025	(Austria) Filip Misolic	(Czech Republic) Dalibor Svrčina	6–2, 6–0
2024	(Poland) Maks Kaśnikowski	(Argentina) Camilo Ugo Carabelli	3–6, 6–4, 6–3
2023	(Argentina) Mariano Navone	(Chile) Tomás Barrios Vera	7–5, 6–3
2022	(France) Arthur Rinderknech	(Chile) Tomás Barrios Vera	6–3, 7–6^{(7–2)}
2021	(Spain) Bernabé Zapata Miralles	(Czech Republic) Jiří Lehečka	6–3, 6–2
2020	Not held		
2019	(Spain) Tommy Robredo	(Germany) Rudolf Molleker	5–7, 6–4, 6–1
2018	(Poland) Hubert Hurkacz	(Japan) Taro Daniel	6–1, 6–1
2017	(Russia) Alexey Vatutin	(Argentina) Guido Andreozzi	2–6, 7–6^{(12–10)}, 6–3
2016	(Moldova) Radu Albot	(Belgium) Clément Geens	6–2, 6–4
2015	(Spain) Pablo Carreño Busta	(Moldova) Radu Albot	6–4, 6–4
2014	(Belgium) David Goffin	(Slovenia) Blaž Rola	6–4, 6–2
2013	(Austria) Andreas Haider-Maurer	(Bosnia and Herzegovina) Damir Džumhur	4–6, 6–1, 7–5
2012	(Poland) Jerzy Janowicz	(France) Jonathan Dasnières de Veigy	6–3, 6–3
2011	(Portugal) Rui Machado	(Poland) Jerzy Janowicz	6–3, 6–3
2010	(Germany) Denis Gremelmayr	(Russia) Andrey Kuznetsov	6–1, 6–2
2009	(Australia) Peter Luczak	(Kazakhstan) Yuri Schukin	3–6, 7–6^{(7–4)}, 7–6^{(8–6)}
2008	(France) Nicolas Devilder	(Germany) Björn Phau	7–5, 6–0
2007	(Netherlands) Raemon Sluiter	(Brazil) Júlio Silva	6–4, 6–3
2006	(Czech Republic) Jan Hájek	(Serbia and Montenegro) Ilija Bozoljac	6–4, 6–3
2005	(Russia) Teymuraz Gabashvili	(Chile) Adrián García	6–4, 6–2
2004	(Czech Republic) Tomáš Zíb	(Argentina) Juan Pablo Brzezicki	6–7^{(4–7)}, 7–6^{(7–3)}, 6–3

=== Doubles ===
Year	Champion	Runner-up	Score
2026	(Spain) Sergio Martos Gornés (Poland) Szymon Walków	(Poland) Karol Drzewiecki (Poland) Piotr Matuszewski	6–3, 7–5
2025	(Spain) Sergio Martos Gornés (India) Vijay Sundar Prashanth	(Romania) Alexandru Jecan (Romania) Bogdan Pavel	2–6, 7–5, [10–8]
2024	(Brazil) Orlando Luz (Brazil) Marcelo Zormann	(Germany) Jakob Schnaitter (Germany) Mark Wallner	5–7, 6–2, [10–6]
2023	(Poland) Karol Drzewiecki (Czech Republic) Petr Nouza	(Uruguay) Ariel Behar (Czech Republic) Adam Pavlásek	7–6^{(7–2)}, 7–6^{(7–2)}
2022	(United States) Hunter Reese (Poland) Szymon Walków	(Czech Republic) Marek Gengel (Czech Republic) Adam Pavlásek	1–6, 6–3, [10–6]
2021	(Czech Republic) Zdeněk Kolář (Czech Republic) Jiří Lehečka	(Poland) Karol Drzewiecki (Australia) Aleksandar Vukic	6–4, 3–6, [10–5]
2020	Not held		
2019	(Italy) Andrea Vavassori (Spain) David Vega Hernández	(Spain) Pedro Martínez (Netherlands) Mark Vervoort	6–4, 6–7^{(4–7)}, [10–6]
2018	(Poland) Mateusz Kowalczyk (Poland) Szymon Walków	(Hungary) Attila Balázs (Italy) Andrea Vavassori	7–5, 6–7^{(8–10)}, [10–8]
2017	(Argentina) Guido Andreozzi (Spain) Jaume Munar	(Poland) Tomasz Bednarek (Portugal) Gonçalo Oliveira	6–7^{(4–7)}, 6–3, [10–4]
2016	(Georgia (country)) Aleksandre Metreveli (Chinese Taipei) Peng Hsien-yin	(Poland) Mateusz Kowalczyk (Poland) Kamil Majchrzak	6–4, 3–6, [10–8]
2015	(Russia) Michail Elgin (Poland) Mateusz Kowalczyk	(Chile) Julio Peralta (United States) Matt Seeberger	3–6, 6–3, [10–6]
2014	(Moldova) Radu Albot (Czech Republic) Adam Pavlásek	(Poland) Tomasz Bednarek (Finland) Henri Kontinen	7–5, 2–6, [10–8]
2013	(Germany) Gero Kretschmer (Germany) Alexander Satschko	(Finland) Henri Kontinen (Poland) Mateusz Kowalczyk	6–3, 6–3
2012	(Australia) Rameez Junaid (Germany) Simon Stadler	(Australia) Adam Hubble (Australia) Nima Roshan	6–3, 6–4
2011	(France) Olivier Charroin (France) Stéphane Robert	(Brazil) Franco Ferreiro (Brazil) André Sá	6–2, 6–3
2010	(Portugal) Rui Machado (Spain) Daniel Muñoz de la Nava	(United States) James Cerretani (Canada) Adil Shamasdin	6–2, 6–3
2009	(Argentina) Sergio Roitman (France) Alexandre Sidorenko	(Germany) Michael Kohlmann (Netherlands) Rogier Wassen	6–4, 6–4
2008	(Sweden) Johan Brunström (Netherlands Antilles) Jean-Julien Rojer	(Colombia) Santiago Giraldo (Spain) Alberto Martín	4–6, 6–0, [10–6]
2007	(Spain) Marc López (Spain) Santiago Ventura	(Italy) Flavio Cipolla (Slovakia) Ivo Klec	6–2, 5–7, [10–3]
2006	(Poland) Tomasz Bednarek (Poland) Michał Przysiężny	(Greece) Vasilis Mazarakis (Czech Republic) Jan Mertl	6–3, 3–6, [10–8]
2005	(Poland) Łukasz Kubot (Poland) Filip Urban	(Chile) Adrián García (Italy) Tomas Tenconi	6–7^{(5–7)}, 6–3, 6–2
2004	(Poland) Adam Chadaj (France) Stéphane Robert	(Czech Republic) Tomáš Cibulec (Czech Republic) David Škoch	3–6, 6–1, 6–2
