= Pantiani =

Pantiani პანტიანი
- Village
- Location within Georgia
- Coordinates: 41°50′54″N 45°18′25″E
- Country: Georgia
- Region: Kakheti
- District: Telavi

Population (2014)
  - Total: 2
- Time zone: UTC+4 (GET)
- Area code: +995

Pantiani (Georgian: პანტიანი) is a village in the Telavi district of Georgia.

== Demography ==
Census Year	population
2002	15
2014	2▼

== See also ==
- Telavi Municipality
