= Roman Vögeli =

Czech-Swiss tennis player (born 1985)

- Country (sports): Czech Republic
- Born: 13 March 1985 (age 40)
- Plays: Right-handed
- Prize money: $60,181

Singles
- Career record: 0–1 (ATP Tour)
- Highest ranking: No. 410 (12 Dec 2011)

Doubles
- Highest ranking: No. 412 (14 Nov 2011)

Roman Vögeli (born 13 March 1985) is a Czech-Swiss former professional tennis player. A citizen of both countries, he competed as a Czech during his playing career and now coaches in Switzerland.

Vögeli grew up in the Czech Republic. When he was 14 his parents moved to Switzerland but he remained in the Czech Republic to attend a sports school run by the country's tennis association. He was the second ranked player in his class behind future Wimbledon finalist Tomáš Berdych.

On the professional tour, Vögeli had a career best singles ranking of 410 and made an ATP Tour main draw appearance as a qualifier at the 2006 Suisse Open Gstaad. His only ITF Futures singles title came at Jūrmala in 2008. He however won 16 ITF Futures titles in doubles and had a best doubles ranking of 412 in the world.

== ITF Futures titles ==
=== Singles: (1) ===
No.	Date	Tournament	Surface	Opponent	Score
1.	Jul 2008	Latvia F1, Jūrmala	Clay	(Poland) Marcin Gawron	6–0, 6–1

=== Doubles: (16) ===
No.	Date	Tournament	Surface	Partner	Opponents	Score
1.	Jul 2003	Georgia F2, Tbilisi	Clay	(Czech Republic) Dušan Karol	(Georgia (country)) Vladimir Kakulia (Georgia (country)) Gouram Kostava	6–3, 6–3
2.	Nov 2005	Israel F1, Ashkelon	Hard	(Czech Republic) Michal Navrátil	(Netherlands) Robin Haase (Netherlands) Igor Sijsling	7–6^{(2)}, 3–6, 6–2
3.	May 2006	Czech Rep. F1, Most	Clay	(Czech Republic) Lukáš Rosol	(Germany) Daniel Brands (Sweden) Johan Brunström	6–2, 5–7, 7–6^{(5)}
4.	Aug 2006	Switzerland F4, Crissier	Clay	(Czech Republic) Martin Vacek	(France) Arnaud Agniel (Austria) Thomas Kostro	6–3, 6–3
5.	May 2007	Czech Rep. F1, Teplice	Clay	(Czech Republic) Karel Tříska	(Austria) Martin Slanar (Slovakia) Igor Zelenay	6–4, 6–4
6.	Nov 2007	Venezuela F9, Isla de Margarita	Clay	(Czech Republic) Michal Konečný	(Venezuela) William Campos (Ecuador) Julio César Campozano	6–0, 6–4
7.	Nov 2007	Venezuela F10, Barquisimeto	Clay	(Czech Republic) Michal Konečný	(France) Marc Auradou (Ecuador) Iván Endara	6–4, 6–2
8.	Jun 2008	Morocco F3, Agadir	Clay	(Czech Republic) Michal Navrátil	(Egypt) Motaz Abou El Khair (France) Julien Mathieu	6–1, 7–6^{(2)}
9.	Aug 2008	Germany F15, Unterföhring	Clay	(Germany) David Klier	(Germany) Marco Kirschner (Germany) Tobias Simon	6–4, 6–3
10.	Aug 2008	Germany F17, Überlingen	Clay	(Czech Republic) Jan Subota	(Slovakia) Adrian Sikora (Czech Republic) Filip Zeman	6–3, 5–7, [10–5]
11.	Mar 2009	Switzerland F1, Greifensee	Carpet	(Czech Republic) Michal Tabara	(Jamaica) Dustin Brown (Switzerland) Alexander Sadecky	6–7^{(6)}, 7–5, [12–10]
12.	May 2009	Czech Rep. F2, Most	Clay	(Czech Republic) Michal Tabara	(Czech Republic) Ladislav Chramosta (Finland) Juho Paukku	6–4, 4–6, [11–9]
13.	Apr 2011	Brazil F9, Santa Maria	Clay	(Canada) Steven Diez	(Paraguay) Daniel Alejandro López Cassaccia (Argentina) Martín Ríos-Benítez	7–6^{(5)}, 6–3
14.	Apr 2011	Brazil F11, Aracaju	Clay	(Canada) Steven Diez	(Bolivia) Mauricio Doria-Medina (Paraguay) Daniel Alejandro López Cassaccia	6–1, 7–6^{(0)}
15.	May 2011	Czech Republic F3, Jablonec nad Nisou	Clay	(Czech Republic) Michal Schmid	(Slovakia) Michal Pazicky (Slovakia) Adrian Sikora	6–3, 6–2
16.	Oct 2011	USA F29, Niceville	Clay	(Lebanon) Bassam Beidas	(United States) Harrison Adams (United States) Shane Vinsant	6–4, 6–0
