= Grzegorz Panfil =

Polish tennis player

- Country (sports): Poland
- Residence: Ustroń, Poland
- Born: 1 January 1988 (age 38) Zabrze, Poland
- Height: 1.83 m (6 ft 0 in)
- Turned pro: 2004
- Plays: Left-handed (two-handed backhand)
- Prize money: $206,216

Singles
- Career record: 2–4
- Career titles: 0
- Highest ranking: No. 238 (8 June 2015)

Grand Slam singles results
- Australian Open: Q1 (2014)

Doubles
- Career record: 2–2
- Career titles: 0
- Highest ranking: No. 176 (30 October 2017)

Team competitions
- Hopman Cup: F (2014)
- Last updated on: 27 July 2021.

Grzegorz Panfil (Polish pronunciation: [ˈɡʐɛɡɔʂ ˈpanfil]; born 1 January 1988) is a Polish professional tennis player.

== Career highlights ==
Panfils' highlights include his win at the F1 Ukrainian Futures Tournament, and his achievements at the Hopman Cup.

=== Hopman Cup ===
At the 2014 Hopman Cup, he represented Poland with Agnieszka Radwańska. The pairing made it to the final, and on the way Panfil defeated 11th-ranked Milos Raonic 7–6^{(7–1)}, 6–3 (at the time Panfil was ranked World No. 288). The talent he displayed through his play at the tournament led for repeated calls by the broadcast commentators (including Darren Cahill) for Panfil to be offered a wildcard entry into the Australian Open. The Hopman Cup provided the largest prize-money win of his career, and in the final he played in front of the largest stadium crowd (circa 10000), to date.

=== Australian Open ===
Panfil would eventually enter the qualifying round at the Australian Open as an Alternate. He lost in the first round to Lorenzo Giustino, 3–6, 6–4, 3–6.

== ATP Challenger and ITF Futures finals ==
=== Singles: 23 (11–12) ===
Legend ATP Challenger (0–0) ITF Futures (11–12)	Finals by surface Hard (1–1) Clay (10–11) Grass (0–0) Carpet (0–0)

Result	W–L	Date	Tournament	Tier	Surface	Opponent	Score
Win	1–0	May 2008	Poland F2, Zabrze	Futures	Clay	(Chile) Guillermo Hormazábal	3–6, 6–1, 6–4
Loss	1–1	Jun 2008	Poland F4, Koszalin	Futures	Clay	(Chile) Guillermo Hormazábal	1–6, 5–7
Win	2–1	Aug 2008	Poland F6, Poznań	Futures	Clay	(Chile) Hans Podlipnik Castillo	6–3, 6–1
Loss	2–2	Jan 2010	Germany F2, Stuttgart	Futures	Hard	(Germany) Bastian Knittel	6–7^{(5–7)}, 1–6
Loss	2–3	Sep 2010	Poland F7, Bydgoszcz	Futures	Clay	(Belarus) Sergey Betov	5–7, 6–3, 3–6
Loss	2–4	Oct 2010	Italy F28, Frascati	Futures	Clay	(France) Augustin Gensse	1–6, 6–3, 2–6
Loss	2–5	May 2011	Poland F1, Kraków	Futures	Clay	(Australia) James Duckworth	3–6, 4–6
Win	3–5	Aug 2011	Poland F6, Olsztyn	Futures	Clay	(Poland) Mateusz Szmigiel	6–2, 6–2
Win	4–5	Sep 2011	Poland F9, Legnica	Futures	Clay	(Poland) Piotr Gadomski	6–3, 6–3
Loss	4–6	Aug 2012	Poland F5, Poznań	Futures	Clay	(Czech Republic) Dušan Lojda	3–6, 6–2, 1–6
Win	5–6	Feb 2013	Ukraine F1, Cherkassy	Futures	Hard	(Ukraine) Marat Deviatiarov	6–3, 6–3
Loss	5–7	May 2013	Sweden F3, Båstad	Futures	Clay	(United Kingdom) Dan Evans	4–6, 6–7^{(4–7)}
Loss	5–8	Jun 2013	Bulgaria F3, Sofia	Futures	Clay	(Belgium) Germain Gigounon	6–2, 5–7, 6–7^{(6–8)}
Win	6–8	Jun 2014	Poland F1, Koszalin	Futures	Clay	(Poland) Marcin Gawron	7–5, 6–2
Loss	6–9	Aug 2014	Poland F5, Poznań	Futures	Clay	(Czech Republic) Michal Schmid	1–6, 6–3, 2–6
Win	7–9	Dec 2014	Argentina F19, Mendoza	Futures	Clay	(Argentina) Guillermo Durán	7–5, 6–4
Loss	7–10	Dec 2014	Argentina F20, Mendoza	Futures	Clay	(Chile) Cristian Garín	4–6, 7–5, 2–6
Win	8–10	Feb 2015	Spain F1, Castelldefels	Futures	Clay	(France) Maxime Hamou	6–2, 4–6, 6–4
Loss	8–11	Mar 2015	Croatia F3, Umag	Futures	Clay	(Italy) Gianluca Naso	5–7, 4–6
Win	9–11	May 2015	Georgia F1, Pantiani	Futures	Clay	(Russia) Alexander Igoshin	3–6, 6–2, 6–4
Win	10–11	May 2015	Georgia F2, Pantiani	Futures	Clay	(Brazil) Pedro Sakamoto	7–6^{(7–5)}, 7–5
Win	11–11	May 2015	Georgia F3, Pantiani	Futures	Clay	(Russia) Victor Baluda	6–1, 7–6^{(7–0)}
Loss	11–12	Apr 2016	Hungary F1, Szeged	Futures	Clay	(Italy) Gianluigi Quinzi	3–6, 5–7

=== Doubles: 57 (32–25) ===
Legend ATP Challenger (0–3) ITF Futures (32–22)	Finals by surface Hard (5–5) Clay (27–18) Grass (0–0) Carpet (1–2)

Result	W–L	Date	Tournament	Tier	Surface	Partner	Opponents	Score
Loss	0–1	May 2006	Poland F5, Bytom	Futures	Clay	(Poland) Błażej Koniusz	(Germany) Gero Kretschmer (Australia) Clinton Thomson	6–4, 2–6, 3–6
Loss	0–2	Dec 2006	Tunisia F6, Hammam Sousse	Futures	Hard	(Ukraine) Orest Tereshchuk	(India) R-S Pathanjali (India) Sunil-Kumar Sipaeya	4–6, 7–5, 3–6
Loss	0–3	Jun 2007	Poland F4, Koszalin	Futures	Clay	(Poland) Mateusz Kowalczyk	(Sweden) Johan Brunström (Kuwait) Mohammad Ghareeb	3–6, 7–6^{(7–5)}, 6–7^{(5–7)}
Win	1–3	Aug 2007	Poland F6, Szczecin	Futures	Clay	(France) Charles Roche	(Italy) Fabio Colangelo (Italy) Mattia Livraghi	6–3, 6–0
Loss	1–4	Mar 2008	Switzerland F1, Leuggern	Futures	Hard	(Poland) Błażej Koniusz	(Jamaica) Dustin Brown (Austria) Armin Sandbichler	3–6, 2–6
Win	2–4	May 2008	Poland F1, Katowice	Futures	Clay	(Poland) Marcin Gawron	(Poland) Błażej Koniusz (Poland) Mateusz Kowalczyk	6–2, 4–6, [10–5]
Win	3–4	Oct 2008	Germany F23, Isernhagen	Futures	Hard	(Czech Republic) Roman Jebavý	(Spain) Ignacio Coll Riudavets (Russia) Dmitri Sitak	6–3, 7–6^{(7–1)}
Loss	3–5	Nov 2008	Toyota, Japan	Challenger	Hard	(Chinese Taipei) Ti Chen	(Denmark) Frederik Nielsen (Pakistan) Aisam Qureshi	5–7, 3–6
Win	4–5	Aug 2009	Slovakia F1, Stupava	Futures	Clay	(Poland) Mateusz Kowalczyk	(Austria) Richard Ruckelshausen (Austria) Bertram Steinberger	6–4, 7–6^{(8–6)}
Win	5–5	Aug 2009	Poland F4, Olsztyn	Futures	Clay	(Poland) Błażej Koniusz	(Poland) Rafal Gozdur (Poland) Mateusz Szmigiel	6–1, 6–3
Win	6–5	Nov 2009	Iran F7, Kish Island	Futures	Clay	(Poland) Marcin Gawron	(Russia) Andrey Kumantsov (Serbia) David Savić	3–6, 6–2, [10–4]
Loss	6–6	Nov 2009	Iran F8, Kish Island	Futures	Clay	(Poland) Marcin Gawron	(Russia) Andrey Kumantsov (Serbia) David Savić	7–6^{(9–7)}, 3–6, [5–10]
Win	7–6	May 2010	Czech Republic F1, Teplice	Futures	Clay	(Czech Republic) Jan Mertl	(Chile) Ricardo Urzua-Rivera (Estonia) Jürgen Zopp	6–3, 6–4
Loss	7–7	May 2010	Poland F2, Kraków	Futures	Clay	(Poland) Błażej Koniusz	(Poland) Marcin Gawron (Poland) Andriej Kapaś	6–3, 0–6, [7–10]
Win	8–7	Jun 2010	Poland F3, Koszalin	Futures	Clay	(Poland) Błażej Koniusz	(Hungary) Robert Varga (Belarus) Sergey Betov	7–6^{(7–3)}, 6–3
Win	9–7	Jun 2010	Poland F4, Gliwice	Futures	Clay	(Poland) Błażej Koniusz	(Belarus) Nikolai Fidirko (Belarus) Andrei Vasilevski	6–3, 6–1
Win	10–7	Aug 2010	Poland F5, Olsztyn	Futures	Clay	(Poland) Mateusz Kowalczyk	(Poland) Rafal Gozdur (Poland) Mateusz Szmigiel	6–4, 6–3
Loss	10–8	Mar 2011	Ukraine F3, Cherkassy	Futures	Hard	(Ukraine) Ivan Anikanov	(Slovenia) Rok Jarc (Slovenia) Tom Kočevar-Dešman	3–6, 6–7^{(4–7)}
Win	11–8	May 2011	Bulgaria F1, Varna	Futures	Clay	(Poland) Marcin Gawron	(Romania) A-D Carpen (Romania) Adrian Cruciat	7–5, 6–2
Loss	11–9	May 2011	Poland F1, Kraków	Futures	Clay	(Poland) Marcin Gawron	(Slovakia) Kamil Čapkovič (Chile) Hans Podlipnik Castillo	walkover
Win	12–9	Aug 2011	Poland F6, Olsztyn	Futures	Clay	(Poland) Błażej Koniusz	(Poland) Arkadiusz Kocyla (Poland) Mikolaj Szmyrgala	6–3, 6–7^{(4–7)}, [10–6]
Win	13–9	Jun 2012	Poland F2, Koszalin	Futures	Clay	(Chile) Guillermo Hormazábal	(Belarus) Egor Gerasimov (Belarus) Dzmitry Zhyrmont	6–2, 6–7^{(4–7)}, [10–5]
Win	14–9	Jun 2012	Poland F3, Bytom	Futures	Clay	(Poland) Mateusz Kowalczyk	(Poland) Piotr Gadomski (Belarus) Andrei Vasilevski	6–4, 7–6^{(7–3)}
Loss	14–10	Aug 2012	Poland F4, Bydgoszcz	Futures	Clay	(Poland) Michał Przysiężny	(Ukraine) Artem Smirnov (Belarus) Andrei Vasilevski	6–7^{(6–8)}, 0–6
Win	15–10	Sep 2012	Poland F6, Legnica	Futures	Clay	(Poland) Marcin Gawron	(Czech Republic) Adam Pavlásek (Czech Republic) Jan Šátral	walkover
Win	16–10	Oct 2012	Germany F18, Leimen	Futures	Hard	(Poland) Marcin Gawron	(Germany) Sascha Lehmann (Chile) Laslo Urrutia Fuentes	6–3, 6–4
Loss	16–11	May 2013	Sweden F2, Båstad	Futures	Clay	(Finland) Timo Nieminen	(Slovenia) Tomislav Ternar (Slovenia) Mike Urbanija	6–4, 5–7, [8–10]
Win	17–11	Jun 2013	Bulgaria F3, Sofia	Futures	Clay	(Poland) Andriej Kapaś	(Bulgaria) Dinko Halachev (Bulgaria) Petar Trendafilov	6–1, 6–4
Loss	17–12	Jun 2013	Germany F5, Essen	Futures	Clay	(Poland) Andriej Kapaś	(Germany) Nils Langer (Germany) Daniel Masur	3–6, 4–6
Win	18–12	Aug 2013	Poland F3, Bydgoszcz	Futures	Clay	(Poland) Andriej Kapaś	(Poland) Adam Chadaj (Czech Republic) Marek Michalička	3–6, 6–4, [10–5]
Loss	18–13	Sep 2013	Poland F5, Bytom	Futures	Clay	(Poland) Andriej Kapaś	(Poland) Piotr Gadomski (Poland) Mateusz Kowalczyk	3–6, 3–6
Win	19–13	Oct 2013	Turkey F40, Antalya	Futures	Hard	(Poland) Andriej Kapaś	(Austria) Pascal Brunner (Austria) Dennis Novak	6–3, 2–6, [10–7]
Loss	19–14	Oct 2013	Turkey F41, Antalya	Futures	Hard	(Poland) Andriej Kapaś	(Czech Republic) Ivo Minář (Czech Republic) Tomas Papik	5–7, 6–7^{(4–7)}
Win	20–14	Dec 2013	Cyprus F3, Larnaca	Futures	Hard	(Romania) A-D Carpen	(Bulgaria) Aleksandar Lazov (Ukraine) Vladyslav Manafov	2–6, 6–1, [10–8]
Loss	20–15	Jun 2014	Czech Republic F3, Jablonec	Futures	Clay	(Poland) Marcin Gawron	(Czech Republic) Marek Michalička (Czech Republic) Dominik Suc	6–3, 4–6, [3–10]
Loss	20–16	Jun 2014	Poland F1, Koszalin	Futures	Clay	(Poland) Marcin Gawron	(Chile) Cristóbal Saavedra Corvalán (Chile) Ricardo Urzua-Rivera	7–6^{(7–3)}, 5–7, [8–10]
Loss	20–17	May 2015	Georgia F2, Pantiani	Futures	Clay	(Poland) Pawel Cias	(Monaco) Benjamin Balleret (Italy) Marco Bortolotti	6–7^{(4–7)}, 5–7
Win	21–17	Aug 2015	Poland F1, Koszalin	Futures	Clay	(Poland) Marcin Gawron	(Czech Republic) Zdeněk Kolář (Czech Republic) Petr Michnev	6–0, 6–4
Win	22–17	Mar 2016	Croatia F3, Pula	Futures	Clay	(Poland) Pawel Cias	(Spain) Pedro Martínez (Spain) Jaume Munar	4–6, 6–3, [10–6]
Loss	22–18	Jun 2016	Poland F2, Koszalin	Futures	Clay	(Poland) Adam Majchrowicz	(Poland) Kamil Gajewski (Poland) Szymon Walków	2–6, 1–6
Win	23–18	Jun 2016	Poland F4, Warsaw	Futures	Clay	(Poland) Marcin Gawron	(Russia) Alexander Zhurbin (Russia) Alexander Igoshin	6–4, 6–3
Win	24–18	Jul 2016	Austria F1, Telfs	Futures	Clay	(Poland) Andriej Kapaś	(Germany) Pascal Meis (Austria) Philipp Schroll	7–5, 7–5
Loss	24–19	Aug 2016	Poland F5, Bydgoszcz	Futures	Clay	(Poland) Michal Dembek	(Austria) Maximilian Neuchrist (Netherlands) David Pel	1–6, 5–7
Win	25–19	Oct 2016	Hungary F7, Balatonboglar	Futures	Clay	(Poland) Mateusz Kowalczyk	(Poland) Pawel Cias (Poland) Marcin Gawron	6–2, 6–7^{(4–7)}, [10–4]
Win	26–19	Oct 2016	Croatia F11, Bol	Futures	Clay	(United Kingdom) James Marsalek	(Netherlands) Jesse Huta Galung (Netherlands) Paul Monteban	2–6, 7–6^{(7–2)}, [10–8]
Win	27–19	Oct 2016	Czech Republic F9, Opava	Futures	Carpet	(Poland) Piotr Matuszewski	(Slovakia) Lukas Klein (Slovakia) Patrik Nema	6–1, 6–3
Win	28–19	Dec 2016	Czech Republic F11, Říčany	Futures	Hard	(Poland) Mateusz Kowalczyk	(Ukraine) Filipp Kekercheni (Ukraine) Danylo Kalenichenko	6–4, 6–2
Loss	28–20	Jan 2017	Germany F3, Nussloch	Futures	Carpet	(Poland) Mateusz Kowalczyk	(Germany) Andreas Mies (Germany) Oscar Otte	3–6, 0–6
Loss	28–21	Feb 2017	Switzerland F1, Oberentfelden	Futures	Carpet	(Poland) Mateusz Kowalczyk	(Germany) Johannes Härteis (France) Hugo Voljacques	7–6^{(7–4)}, 3–6, [8–10]
Win	29–21	Apr 2017	Italy F6, Santa Margherita	Futures	Clay	(Poland) Mateusz Kowalczyk	(Argentina) Andrea Collarini (Argentina) Juan Pablo Paz	6–1, 7–6^{(7–5)}
Loss	29–22	Apr 2017	Italy F9, Santa Margherita	Futures	Clay	(Poland) Mateusz Kowalczyk	(Italy) Lorenzo Frigerio (Croatia) Viktor Galović	3–6, 6–3, [7–10]
Loss	29–23	Apr 2017	Italy F10, Santa Margherita	Futures	Clay	(Poland) Mateusz Kowalczyk	(Switzerland) Adrian Bodmer (Germany) Jakob Sude	6–4, 6–7^{(7–9)}, [5–10]
Win	30–23	May 2017	Czech Republic F2, Most	Futures	Clay	(Czech Republic) Dominik Kellovský	(Czech Republic) Tomas Papik (Czech Republic) Matěj Vocel	6–3, 6–2
Win	31–23	Jun 2017	Italy F15, Reggio Emilia	Futures	Clay	(Croatia) Ante Pavić	(United States) Alexander Centenari (Ecuador) Gonzalo Escobar	6–1, 7–6^{(7–4)}
Loss	31–24	Oct 2017	Lima, Peru	Challenger	Clay	(Portugal) Gonçalo Oliveira	(Mexico) Miguel Ángel Reyes-Varela (Slovenia) Blaž Rola	5–7, 3–6
Win	32–24	May 2018	Poland F4, Ustroń	Futures	Clay	(Poland) Pawel Cias	(Switzerland) Luca Castelnuovo (Belarus) Mikalai Haliak	6–4, 6–4
Loss	32–25	Aug 2018	Meerbusch, Germany	Challenger	Clay	(Ukraine) Volodymyr Uzhylovskyi	(Spain) David Pérez Sanz (Netherlands) Mark Vervoort	6–3, 4–6, [7–10]

References:

- ITFTennis.com
- TennisLive.net

== Junior Grand Slam finals ==
=== Doubles: 1 (1–0) ===
Result	Year	Championship	Surface	Partner	Opponents	Score
Win	2006	Australian Open	Hard	(Poland) Błażej Koniusz	(United States) Kellen Damico (United States) Nathaniel Schnugg	7–6^{(7–5)}, 6–3
