= Park Tenisowy Olimpia =

Tennis complex in Poznań, Poland

Coordinates: 52.425657°N 16.892503°E

- Location: Warmińska 1, Poznań, Poland
- Owner: City of Poznań
- Operator: Poznański Ośrodek Sportu i Rekreacji
- Capacity: ~2,500
- Surface: Clay (red)

Construction
- Built: 1948–1954

Tenants
- Poznań Open (Challenger Tour) (2004–present)

The Park Tenisowy Olimpia is a tennis complex in Poznań, Poland, owned by the city since November 2013. It is the host of the annual ATP Challenger Tour stop, the Poznań Open. The complex consist of two show courts (Kort Centralny and Kort nr 1), three ground courts and five indoor courts.

Main Court (Kort Centralny) holds approximately 1,500 spectators (including places on VIP lounge), and Grandstand (Kort nr 1) holds 720 spectators. During the tournaments the Main Court is upgraded by around 250 seats due to installation of the temporary stand, opposite to the VIP lounge.

== See also ==
- List of tennis stadiums by capacity
