= Denis Gremelmayr =

German tennis player

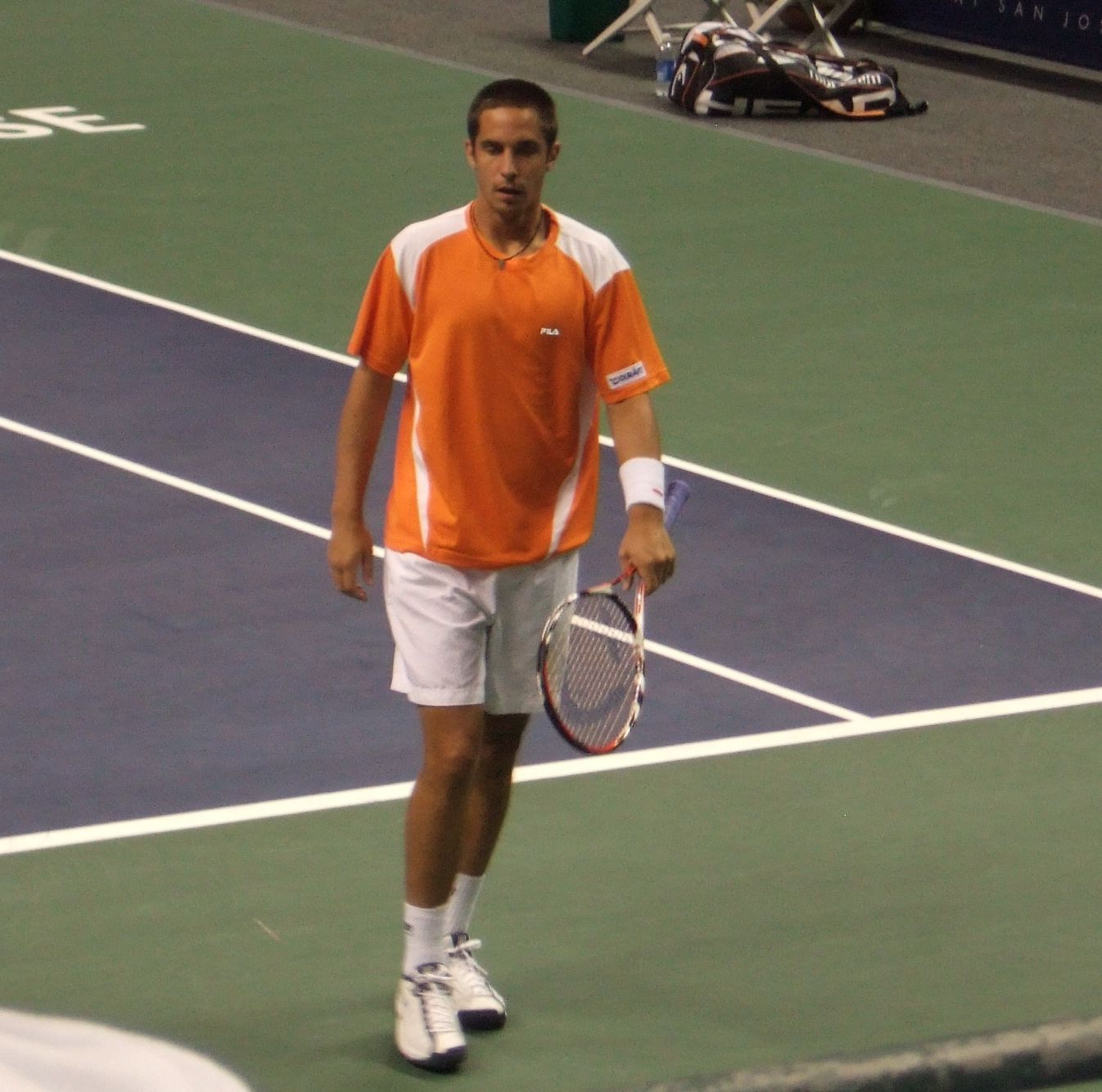
- Country (sports): Germany
- Residence: Lampertheim, Germany
- Born: 16 August 1981 (age 44) Heidelberg, West Germany
- Height: 1.83 m (6 ft 0 in)
- Turned pro: 2000
- Retired: 2013
- Plays: Left-handed (two-handed backhand)
- Prize money: $1,023,334

Singles
- Career record: 32–58
- Career titles: 0
- Highest ranking: No. 59 (5 May 2008)

Grand Slam singles results
- Australian Open: 3R (2006)
- French Open: 1R (2008, 2009, 2011)
- Wimbledon: 1R (2008, 2011)
- US Open: 1R (2008)

Doubles
- Career record: 8–15
- Career titles: 0
- Highest ranking: No. 188 (22 June 2009)

Grand Slam doubles results
- Wimbledon: 2R (2008)
- US Open: 1R (2008)
- Last updated on: 8 February 2022.

Denis Gremelmayr (born 16 August 1981) is an inactive German male tennis player. His career-high singles ranking is World No. 59, achieved in May 2008.

Glemelmayr was born in Heidelberg, Baden-Württemberg. He reached the semifinals of Estoril, Barcelona and Los Angeles in 2008, losing to Roger Federer, Rafael Nadal and Andy Roddick respectively.

== Performance timeline ==
Key
W	F	SF	QF	#R	RR	Q#	DNQ	A	NH

(W) winner; (F) finalist; (SF) semifinalist; (QF) quarterfinalist; (#R) rounds 4, 3, 2, 1; (RR) round-robin stage; (Q#) qualification round; (DNQ) did not qualify; (A) absent; (NH) not held; (SR) strike rate (events won / competed); (W–L) win–loss record.

=== Singles ===
Tournament	2001	2002	2003	2004	2005	2006	2007	2008	2009	2010	2011	2012	SR	W–L	Win%
Grand Slam tournaments
Australian Open	A	A	A	A	A	3R	Q3	2R	1R	Q1	1R	Q1	0 / 4	3–4	43%
French Open	A	A	A	A	A	Q2	Q1	1R	1R	A	1R	Q1	0 / 3	0–3	0%
Wimbledon	A	A	A	A	A	A	A	1R	A	A	1R	Q2	0 / 2	0–2	0%
US Open	A	A	A	A	Q3	Q3	Q1	1R	A	A	A	A	0 / 1	0–1	0%
Win–loss	0–0	0–0	0–0	0–0	0–0	2–1	0–0	1–4	0–2	0–0	0–3	0–0	0 / 10	3–10	23%
ATP World Tour Masters 1000
Indian Wells	A	A	A	A	A	A	A	A	1R	A	A	Q1	0 / 1	0–1	0%
Miami	A	A	A	A	A	A	A	Q2	Q1	A	A	A	0 / 0	0–0	–
Monte Carlo	A	A	A	A	A	Q1	A	A	A	A	Q1	A	0 / 0	0–0	–
Hamburg	Q1	A	Q2	A	A	A	A	A	A	A	A	A	0 / 0	0–0	–
Canada	A	A	A	A	A	2R	A	A	A	A	A	A	0 / 1	1–1	50%
Cincinnati	A	A	A	A	A	Q1	A	A	A	A	A	A	0 / 0	0–0	–
Win–loss	0–0	0–0	0–0	0–0	0–0	1–1	0–0	0–0	0–1	0–0	0–0	0–0	0 / 2	1–2	33%

== ATP Challenger and ITF Futures finals ==
=== Singles: 20 (14–6) ===
Legend ATP Challenger (6–2) ITF Futures (8–4)	Finals by surface Hard (4–4) Clay (8–2) Grass (0–0) Carpet (2–0)

Result	W–L	Date	Tournament	Tier	Surface	Opponent	Score
Win	1-0	Oct 2000	Japan F8, Kawaguchi	Futures	Hard	(Australia) Leigh Holland	6–1, 6–2
Win	2-0	Jan 2001	India F1, Jorhat	Futures	Clay	(Italy) Fabio Maggi	7–6^{(7–5)}, 7–5
Loss	2-1	Sep 2001	Korea F3, Cheongju	Futures	Clay	(Argentina) Roberto Marcelo Alvarez	7–6^{(7–3)}, 1–6, 5–7
Win	3-1	Oct 2001	Dominican Republic F1, Santo Domingo	Futures	Clay	(Venezuela) José de Armas	6–4, 6–0
Win	4-1	Jan 2002	UAE F1, Abu Dhabi	Futures	Hard	(Czech Republic) Jaroslav Levinský	walkover
Win	5-1	Aug 2003	Netherlands F5, Alphen	Futures	Clay	(Sweden) Robert Lindstedt	6–3, 3–6, 6–3
Loss	5-2	Sep 2004	Spain F23, Madrid	Futures	Hard	(Spain) Juan-Luis Rascon-Lope	5–7, 6–7^{(2–7)}
Win	6-2	Nov 2004	Thailand F2, Bangkok	Futures	Hard	(Netherlands) Ruben De Kleijn	6–4, 6–0
Loss	6-3	Nov 2004	Thailand F3, Pattaya	Futures	Hard	(South Korea) Kim Young-Jun	3–6, 1–3 ret.
Loss	6-4	Mar 2005	France F5, Poitiers	Futures	Hard	(Poland) Adam Chadaj	3–6, 1–6
Win	7-4	Jul 2005	Netherlands F2, Heerhugowaard	Futures	Clay	(Argentina) Nicolás Todero	6–4, 6–2
Win	8-4	Jul 2005	Germany F7, Kassel	Futures	Clay	(Germany) Sascha Kloer	6–2, 6–1
Loss	8-5	Oct 2005	Calabasas, United States	Challenger	Hard	(United States) Brian Vahaly	6–3, 2–6, 2–6
Loss	8-6	Jun 2007	Košice, Slovakia	Challenger	Clay	(France) Jérémy Chardy	6–4, 6–7^{(5–7)}, 4–6
Win	9-6	Sep 2007	Düsseldorf, Germany	Challenger	Clay	(Austria) Andreas Haider-Maurer	6–7^{(5–7)}, 6–2, 6–4
Win	10-6	Nov 2007	Eckental, Germany	Challenger	Carpet	(Croatia) Roko Karanušić	walkover
Win	11-6	Nov 2008	Eckental, Germany	Challenger	Carpet	(Croatia) Roko Karanušić	6–2, 7–5
Win	12-6	May 2010	Cremona, Italy	Challenger	Hard	(Romania) Marius Copil	6–4, 7–5
Win	13-6	Jul 2010	Scheveningen, Netherlands	Challenger	Clay	(Netherlands) Thomas Schoorel	7–5, 6–4
Win	14-6	Jul 2010	Poznań, Poland	Challenger	Clay	(Russia) Andrey Kuznetsov	6–1, 6–2

=== Doubles: 10 (4–6) ===
Legend ATP Challenger (2–3) ITF Futures (2–3)	Finals by surface Hard (0–2) Clay (4–3) Grass (0–0) Carpet (0–1)

Result	W–L	Date	Tournament	Tier	Surface	Partner	Opponents	Score
Win	1–0	May 2002	Germany F4, Arnsberg	Futures	Clay	(Sweden) Fredrik Lovén	(Romania) Victor Ioniță (Germany) Daniel Lesske	6–1, 6–2
Loss	1–1	Apr 2003	Spain F7, Vinaròs	Futures	Clay	(Germany) Lars Uebel	(Romania) Adrian Cruciat (Spain) Miguel Ángel López Jaén	walkover
Win	2–1	Jun 2003	Furth, Germany	Challenger	Clay	(Germany) Simon Greul	(Germany) Tomas Behrend (Germany) Karsten Braasch	6–3, 1–6, 7–6^{(7–5)}
Loss	2–2	Mar 2005	France F5, Poitiers	Futures	Hard	(Germany) Philipp Marx	(France) Nicolas Renavand (France) Nicolas Tourte	1–6, 7–5, 3–6
Loss	2–3	Jun 2005	Netherlands F1, Alkmaar	Futures	Clay	(Germany) Philipp Marx	(Belgium) Dominique Coene (Belgium) Stefan Wauters	5–7, 1–6
Loss	2–4	Jan 2006	Nouméa, New Caledonia	Challenger	Hard	(Germany) Lars Burgsmüller	(United States) Alex Bogomolov Jr (United States) Todd Widom	6–3, 2–6, [6–10]
Loss	2–5	Apr 2008	Monza, Italy	Challenger	Clay	(Germany) Simon Greul	(Italy) Stefano Galvani (Spain) Alberto Martín	5–7, 6–2, [3–10]
Win	3–5	Feb 2010	Egypt F1, Gize	Futures	Clay	(Spain) Gerard Granollers Pujol	(Egypt) Karim Maamoun (Egypt) Sherif Sabry	6–4, 7–5
Win	4–5	Jun 2010	Marburg, Germany	Challenger	Clay	(Germany) Matthias Bachinger	(Spain) Guillermo Olaso (Slovenia) Grega Žemlja	6–4, 6–4
Loss	4–6	Oct 2010	Rennes, France	Challenger	Carpet	(Germany) Björn Phau	(United States) Scott Lipsky (United States) David Martin	4–6, 7–5, [10–12]
