= Adam Chadaj =

Polish tennis player

- Full name: Adam Chadaj
- Country (sports): Poland
- Born: 1 May 1984 (age 41) Warsaw, Poland
- Turned pro: 2001
- Plays: Left-handed (Double Handed Backhand)
- Prize money: $145,999

Singles
- Career record: 3–1
- Career titles: 0
- Highest ranking: No. 202 (22 August 2005)

Doubles
- Career record: 0–1
- Career titles: 0
- Highest ranking: No. 151 (25 July 2005)

Adam Chadaj (Polish pronunciation: [ˈadam ˈxadaj]; born 1 May 1984) is a professional tennis player from Poland.

== Biography ==
Chadaj was born in Warsaw and turned professional in 2001.

His first Challenger title came with Stéphane Robert in the doubles event at the 2004 Poznań Open.

He represented the Poland Davis Cup team in a 2005 tie against Estonia in Gdynia and featured in two singles rubbers, for wins over Mait Künnap and Mikk Irdoja. Soon after he made his debut in an ATP Tour level tournament when he was a wild card entrant into the main draw of the 2005 Idea Prokom Open in Sopot. He won his first round match against Alessio di Mauro, then lost in the second round to José Acasuso. On the Challenger circuit in 2005 his wins included Julien Benneteau, Nicolas Mahut and Sam Querrey.

In 2006 he won a second Challenger title, the doubles event in Telde, Spain, with Sweden's Michael Ryderstedt.

He made another ATP Tour tournament appearance in 2007 at the Orange Prokom Open. Competing in the doubles, Chadaj and partner Marcin Gawron were beaten in the opening round.

== Challenger titles ==
=== Doubles: (2) ===
No.	Year	Tournament	Surface	Partner	Opponents	Score
1.	2004	Poznań, Poland	Clay	(France) Stéphane Robert	(Czech Republic) Tomáš Cibulec (Czech Republic) David Škoch	3–6, 6–1, 6–2
2.	2006	Telde, Spain	Clay	(Sweden) Michael Ryderstedt	(Spain) David Marrero (Spain) Daniel Muñoz de la Nava	5–7, 6–3, 10–7

== See also ==
- List of Poland Davis Cup team representatives
