= Yuri Schukin =

Kazakhstani tennis player

Yuri Schukin Ю́рий Щу́кин
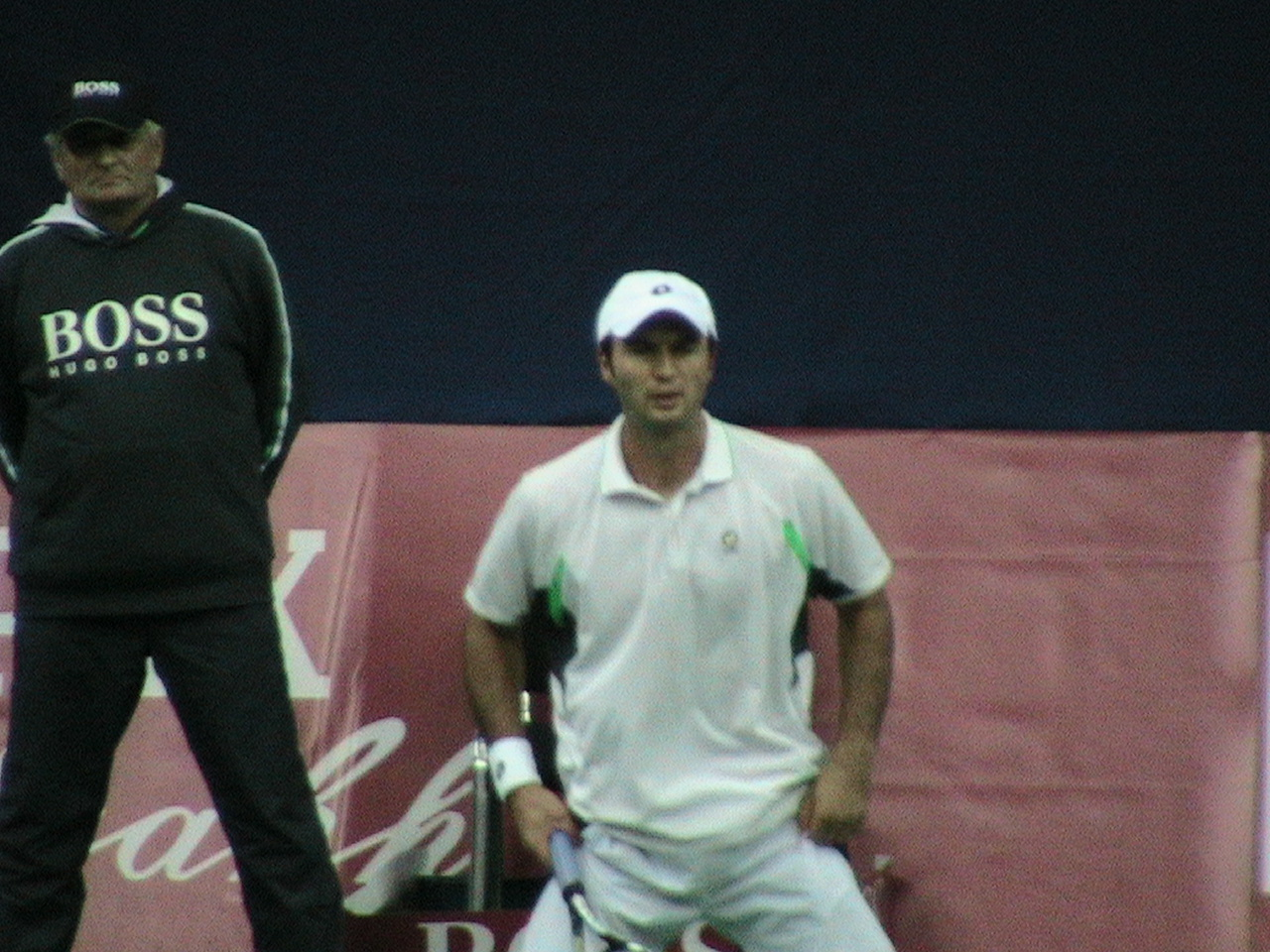
- Country (sports): Kazakhstan
- Residence: Berlin, Germany
- Born: 26 June 1979 (age 45); Kislovodsk, Russian SFSR, Soviet Union
- Height: 6 ft 1 in (185 cm)
- Turned pro: 1999
- Retired: 2018
- Plays: Right-handed (two-handed backhand)
- Prize money: $723,143

Singles
- Career record: 14–22
- Career titles: 0
- Highest ranking: No. 119 (19 November 2007)

Grand Slam singles results
- Australian Open: 1R (2001)
- French Open: 2R (2010)
- Wimbledon: Q1 (2002, 2003, 2004, 2005)
- US Open: Q2 (2001)

Doubles
- Career record: 15–17
- Career titles: 0
- Highest ranking: No. 117 (16 October 2000)

Grand Slam doubles results
- Australian Open: 1R (2001)
- Wimbledon: Q1 (2002, 2003)
- US Open: Q2 (2001)

Team competitions
- Davis Cup: QF (2013)
- Last updated on: May 22, 2021.

Yuri Schukin (Russian: Ю́рий Ива́нович Щу́кин, romanized: Shchukin; born 26 June 1979) is a retired Russian-born Kazakhstani tennis player.

Schukin has a career high ATP singles ranking of World No. 119, achieved on 19 November 2007. He also has a career high ATP doubles ranking of World No. 117, achieved on 16 October 2000.

== Career ==
Schukin made his ATP Tour singles debut at the 2001 Australian Open where he battled through the qualifying rounds to earn a spot in the main draw. In qualifying, he defeated Neville Godwin 4–6, 6–1, 6–4, Eric Taino 7–5, 6–1 and lastly Robin Vik 0–6, 7–6^{(7–4)}, 8–6 to solidify the first main draw appearance of his career. In the first round he was defeated by Australian Wayne Arthurs in four sets 3–6, 5–7, 6–4, 2–6.

He made his ATP double main draw debut at the 2000 Dutch Open in Amsterdam, Netherlands. Alongside Orlin Stanoytchev, they were granted direct entry into the main doubles draw where they proceeded to defeat José Frontera and Sander Groen 6–4, 6–2 in the first round, and followed that up with an upset victory over the first seeds Thomas Shimada and Myles Wakefield 6–3, 3–6, 6–3 before eventually being defeated in the semi-finals at the hands of Edwin Kempes and Dennis van Scheppingen 4–6, 6–3, 1–6.

=== 2008 ===
He began the 2008 tour season by losing in the first round to Rajeev Ram at the Chennai Open 6–7, 6–7.

Santos has reached 19 career singles finals, with a record of 9 wins and 10 losses which includes an 8–8 record in ATP Challenger Tour finals. Additionally, he has reached 42 doubles finals with a record of 20 wins and 22 losses, including having an 0–1 record in ATP Tour finals and a 16–17 record in ATP Challenger Tour finals.

== ATP career finals ==
=== Doubles: 1 (1 runner-up) ===
Legend Grand Slam (0–0) ATP Finals (0–0) ATP Tour Masters 1000 (0–0) ATP Tour 500 (0–0) ATP Tour 250 (0–1)	Titles by surface Hard (0–0) Clay (0–1) Grass (0–0)	Titles by setting Outdoor (0–1) Indoor (0–0)

Result	W–L	Date	Tournament	Tier	Surface	Partner	Opponents	Score
Loss	0–1	Jun 2008	Warsaw Open, Poland	250 Series	Clay	(Russia) Nikolay Davydenko	(Poland) Mariusz Fyrstenberg (Poland) Marcin Matkowski	0–6, 6–3, [4–10]

== ATP Challenger and ITF Futures finals ==
=== Singles: 19 (9–10) ===
Legend ATP Challenger (8–8) ITF Futures (1–2)	Finals by surface Hard (1–2) Clay (7–7) Grass (0–0) Carpet (1–1)

Result	W–L	Date	Tournament	Tier	Surface	Opponent	Score
Loss	0–1	May 1999	Great Britain F7, Edinburgh	Futures	Clay	(Sweden) Patrik Fredriksson	4–6, 4–6
Loss	0–2	Apr 2000	Algeria F1, Algiers	Futures	Clay	(Spain) Albert Montañés	0–6, 3–6
Win	1–2	Aug 2000	Sylt, Germany	Challenger	Clay	(Germany) Jakub Herm-Zahlava	6–2, 6–4
Loss	1–3	Sep 2000	Skopje, Macedonia	Challenger	Clay	(Germany) Oliver Gross	5–7, 4–6
Loss	1–4	Aug 2001	Graz, Austria	Challenger	Hard	(Austria) Julian Knowle	3–6, 2–6
Loss	1–5	Dec 2001	Milan, Italy	Challenger	Carpet	(Switzerland) Marc Rosset	6–3, 1–6, 4–6
Loss	1–6	Mar 2003	Ho Chi Minh City, Vietnam	Challenger	Hard	(Israel) Amir Hadad	4–6, 6–7^{(2–7)}
Win	2–6	Oct 2003	Belgaum, India	Challenger	Hard	(Germany) Dieter Kindlmann	6–3, 6–2
Win	3–6	Jan 2004	Germany F1, Nussloch	Futures	Carpet	(Germany) Philipp Marx	6–7^{(3–7)}, 6–4, 6–4
Win	4–6	Sep 2004	Banja Luka, Bosnia & Herzegovina	Challenger	Clay	(Austria) Werner Eschauer	7–6^{(7–3)}, 7–6^{(9–7)}
Loss	4–7	Apr 2007	Fez, Morocco	Challenger	Clay	(Australia) Peter Luczak	2–6, 7–6^{(7–3)}, 6–7^{(1–7)}
Win	5–7	May 2007	Dresden, Germany	Challenger	Clay	(Germany) Florian Mayer	7–6^{(7–5)}, 7–6^{(7–3)}
Win	6–7	Aug 2007	Geneva, Switzerland	Challenger	Clay	(Netherlands) Jesse Huta Galung	6–3, 6–2
Win	7–7	Sep 2007	Napoli, Italy	Challenger	Clay	(Argentina) Martín Vassallo Argüello	7–6^{(7–3)}, 6–1
Loss	7–8	Aug 2008	Geneva, Switzerland	Challenger	Clay	(Belgium) Kristof Vliegen	2–6, 1–6
Loss	7–9	Jul 2009	Poznań, Poland	Challenger	Clay	(Australia) Peter Luczak	6–3, 6–7^{(4–7)}, 6–7^{(6–8)}
Win	8–9	May 2010	Zagreb, Croatia	Challenger	Clay	(Spain) Santiago Ventura	6–3, 7–5
Loss	8–10	Sep 2010	Trnava, Slovakia	Challenger	Clay	(Czech Republic) Jaroslav Pospíšil	4–6, 6–4, 3–6
Win	9–10	Jun 2011	Prostějov, Czech Republic	Challenger	Clay	(Italy) Flavio Cipolla	6–4, 4–6, 6–0

=== Doubles: 41 (20–21) ===
Legend ATP Challenger (16–17) ITF Futures (4–4)	Finals by surface Hard (2–2) Clay (17–18) Grass (0–1) Carpet (1–0)

Result	W–L	Date	Tournament	Tier	Surface	Partner	Opponents	Score
Loss	0–1	Jun 1999	Germany F4B, Riemerling	Futures	Clay	(Germany) Erik Truempler	(Mexico) Enrique Abaroa (Argentina) Damián Furmanski	4–6, 0–6
Win	1–1	Jul 1999	Germany F7, Kassel	Futures	Clay	(Germany) Andreas Tattermusch	(Germany) Frank Moser (Germany) Bernard Parun	6–4, 6–1
Loss	1–2	Sep 1999	Ukraine F5, Gorlivka	Futures	Clay	(Hungary) Kornél Bardóczky	(Republic of Ireland) Scott Barron (Germany) Andreas Tattermusch	3–6, 6–7
Loss	1–3	Dec 1999	Jaipur, India	Challenger	Grass	(Croatia) Ivo Karlović	(Czech Republic) Tomas Anzari (Japan) Satoshi Iwabuchi	6–7, 6–4, 6–7
Loss	1–4	Jul 2000	Poland F3, Katowice	Futures	Clay	(Poland) Maciej Domka	(Poland) Krzysztof Kwinta (Poland) Marcin Matkowski	3–6, 5–7
Loss	1–5	Aug 2000	Togliatti, Russia	Challenger	Hard	(Romania) Ionuț Moldovan	(Federal Republic of Yugoslavia) Dušan Vemić (Croatia) Lovro Zovko	4–6, 4–6
Win	2–5	Aug 2000	Sylt, Germany	Challenger	Clay	(Romania) Ionuț Moldovan	(Australia) Ashley Fisher (South Africa) Gareth Williams	6–4, 6–2
Win	3–5	Sep 2000	Freudenstadt, Germany	Challenger	Clay	(Romania) Ionuț Moldovan	(Austria) Julian Knowle (Switzerland) Jean-Claude Scherrer	3–6, 6–3, 6–4
Win	4–5	Sep 2000	Brașov, Romania	Challenger	Clay	(Romania) Ionuț Moldovan	(Belgium) Dick Norman (Austria) Wolfgang Schranz	6–4, 6–1
Win	5–5	Oct 2000	Tangiers, Morocco	Challenger	Clay	(Romania) Ionuț Moldovan	(Argentina) Cristian Kordasz (Brazil) Cristiano Testa	6–4, 2–6, 6–2
Loss	5–6	Jun 2001	Bucharest, Romania	Challenger	Clay	(Romania) Ionuț Moldovan	(The Bahamas) Mark Merklein (South Africa) Paul Rosner	4–6, 4–6
Loss	5–7	Sep 2001	Budapest II, Hungary	Challenger	Clay	(Ukraine) Orest Tereshchuk	(Austria) Oliver Marach (Finland) Jarkko Nieminen	2–6, 2–6
Loss	5–8	Sep 2002	Freudenstadt, Germany	Challenger	Clay	(Spain) Juan-Manuel Balcells	(Argentina) Diego del Río (Argentina) Leonardo Olguín	6–7^{(2–7)}, 4–6
Loss	5–9	Sep 2002	Kyiv, Ukraine	Challenger	Clay	(Georgia (country)) Irakli Labadze	(Netherlands) Fred Hemmes (Argentina) Federico Browne	4–6, 3–6
Win	6–9	Sep 2002	Banja Luka, Bosnia & Herzegovina	Challenger	Clay	(Czech Republic) Jaroslav Levinský	(Argentina) Daniel Orsanic (Argentina) Juan Pablo Guzmán	7–6^{(7–5)}, 7–5
Loss	6–10	Aug 2003	St. Petersburg, Russia	Challenger	Clay	(Russia) Dmitry Vlasov	(Russia) Mikhail Elgin (Ukraine) Orest Tereshchuk	6–3, 3–6, 5–7
Win	7–10	Sep 2003	Banja Luka, Bosnia & Herzegovina	Challenger	Clay	(Romania) Ionuț Moldovan	(Serbia and Montenegro) Goran Tošić (Serbia and Montenegro) Nikola Ćirić	6–2, 7–5
Win	8–10	Jan 2004	Germany F1, Nussloch	Futures	Carpet	(Russia) Dmitry Vlasov	(Germany) Aleksey Malajko (Georgia (country)) Lado Chikhladze	7–5, 6–3
Loss	8–11	Feb 2004	Ho Chi Minh City, Vietnam	Challenger	Hard	(Uzbekistan) Vadim Kutsenko	(South Africa) Rik de Voest (Netherlands) Fred Hemmes	3–6, 3–6
Win	9–11	Apr 2004	Italy F1, Frascati	Futures	Clay	(Germany) Marcello Craca	(Italy) Giancarlo Petrazzuolo (Italy) Daniele Giorgini	6–7^{(3–7)}, 6–3, 6–4
Loss	9–12	Sep 2004	Kyiv, Ukraine	Challenger	Clay	(Russia) Igor Kunitsyn	(Argentina) Sergio Roitman (Spain) Albert Portas	1–6, 1–6
Loss	9–13	Oct 2004	Dubrovnik, Croatia	Challenger	Clay	(Italy) Leonardo Azzaro	(Argentina) Juan Pablo Brzezicki (Argentina) Martín Vassallo Argüello	1–6, 2–6
Loss	9–14	Mar 2005	Barletta, Italy	Challenger	Clay	(Czech Republic) Lukáš Dlouhý	(Belgium) Tom Vanhoudt (Belgium) Kristof Vliegen	4–6, 7–5, 5–7
Win	10–14	Jun 2005	Reggio Emilia, Italy	Challenger	Clay	(Georgia (country)) Irakli Labadze	(Italy) Francesco Aldi (Italy) Tomas Tenconi	6–4, 6–3
Win	11–14	Aug 2006	Geneva, Switzerland	Challenger	Clay	(Czech Republic) Michal Navrátil	(Croatia) Lovro Zovko (Greece) Konstantinos Economidis	1–6, 6–2, [10–6]
Loss	11–15	Mar 2007	Morocco F2, Rabat	Futures	Clay	(Germany) Torsten Popp	(Slovakia) Kamil Čapkovič (Slovakia) Pavol Červenák	2–6, 0–6
Win	12–15	Mar 2007	Rabat, Morocco	Challenger	Clay	(Ukraine) Orest Tereshchuk	(Serbia) Boris Pashanski (Australia) Peter Luczak	6–7^{(8–10)}, 7–6^{(7–4)}, [10–3]
Win	13–15	Aug 2007	Graz, Austria	Challenger	Clay	(Argentina) Sebastián Decoud	(France) Jérémy Chardy (North Macedonia) Predrag Rusevski	3–6, 6–3, [10–7]
Win	14–15	Aug 2007	Geneva, Switzerland	Challenger	Clay	(Argentina) Sebastián Decoud	(France) Olivier Charroin (United States) James Cerretani	6–3, 6–7^{(4–7)}, [10–4]
Loss	14–16	Mar 2008	Meknes, Morocco	Challenger	Clay	(Russia) Mikhail Elgin	(Spain) Daniel Munoz-de la Nava (Spain) Alberto Martín	4–6, 7–6^{(7–2)}, [6–10]
Win	15–16	May 2009	San Remo, Italy	Challenger	Clay	(Russia) Dmitri Sitak	(Italy) Daniele Bracciali (Italy) Giancarlo Petrazzuolo	6–4, 7–6^{(7–4)}
Win	16–16	Aug 2009	Tampere, Finland	Challenger	Clay	(Australia) Peter Luczak	(Italy) Simone Vagnozzi (Italy) Uros Vico	6–1, 6–7^{(6–8)}, [10–4]
Win	17–16	Feb 2010	Kazan, Russia	Challenger	Hard	(Czech Republic) Jan Mertl	(Germany) Tobias Kamke (Germany) Julian Reister	6–2, 6–4
Loss	17–17	Jul 2010	Braunschweig, Germany	Challenger	Clay	(Russia) Igor Kunitsyn	(Portugal) Leonardo Tavares (Italy) Simone Vagnozzi	5–7, 6–7^{(4–7)}
Loss	17–18	Mar 2011	Rabat, Morocco	Challenger	Clay	(Kazakhstan) Evgeny Korolev	(Italy) Alessio di Mauro (Italy) Simone Vagnozzi	4–6, 4–6
Loss	17–19	Sep 2011	Szczecin, Poland	Challenger	Clay	(Kazakhstan) Andrey Golubev	(Poland) Andriej Kapaś (Poland) Marcin Gawron	4–6, 3–6
Win	18–19	Oct 2011	Napoli, Italy	Challenger	Clay	(Croatia) Antonio Veić	(Chinese Taipei) Hsieh Cheng-peng (Chinese Taipei) Lee Hsin-han	6–7^{(5–7)}, 7–5, [10–8]
Win	19–19	Jun 2012	Monza, Italy	Challenger	Clay	(Kazakhstan) Andrey Golubev	(Italy) Stefano Ianni (Russia) Teymuraz Gabashvili	7–6^{(7–4)}, 5–7, [10–7]
Loss	19–20	Jul 2012	Milan, Italy	Challenger	Clay	(Kazakhstan) Andrey Golubev	(Germany) Simon Stadler (United States) Nicholas Monroe	4–6, 6–3, [9–11]
Loss	19–21	Sep 2012	Lermontov, Russia	Challenger	Clay	(Kazakhstan) Andrey Golubev	(Russia) Konstantin Kravchuk (Ukraine) Denys Molchanov	3–6, 4–6
Win	20–21	Feb 2013	Kazakhstan F1, Aktobe	Futures	Hard	(Russia) Alexander Kudryavtsev	(Croatia) Mate Pavić (Russia) Victor Baluda	7–6^{(8–6)}, 6–2

== Performance timeline ==
Key
W	F	SF	QF	#R	RR	Q#	DNQ	A	NH

(W) winner; (F) finalist; (SF) semifinalist; (QF) quarterfinalist; (#R) rounds 4, 3, 2, 1; (RR) round-robin stage; (Q#) qualification round; (DNQ) did not qualify; (A) absent; (NH) not held; (SR) strike rate (events won / competed); (W–L) win–loss record.
To avoid confusion and double counting, these charts are updated at the conclusion of a tournament or when the player's participation has ended.

=== Singles ===
Tournament	2001	2002	2003	2004	2005	2006	2007	2008	2009	2010	2011	2012	SR	W–L	Win %
Grand Slam tournaments
Australian Open	1R	Q3	Q1	A	Q2	Q1	Q2	Q1	Q1	A	A	Q1	0 / 1	0–1	0%
French Open	Q2	Q3	Q1	A	Q2	A	Q1	Q3	Q1	2R	Q1	Q1	0 / 1	1–1	50%
Wimbledon	A	Q1	Q1	Q1	Q1	A	A	A	A	A	A	A	0 / 0	0–0	–
US Open	Q2	A	A	A	Q1	A	A	A	A	A	A	A	0 / 0	0–0	–
Win–loss	0–1	0–0	0–0	0–0	0–0	0–0	0–0	0–0	0–0	1–1	0–0	0–0	0 / 2	1–2	33%
