= Andriej Kapaś =

Polish tennis player

- Country (sports): Poland
- Born: 11 August 1989 (age 36) Kiev, Ukraine
- Turned pro: 2007
- Plays: Right-handed (two-handed backhand)
- Prize money: US$111,567

Singles
- Career record: 0–0
- Highest ranking: No. 323 (6 April 2015)

Doubles
- Career record: 0–0
- Highest ranking: No. 163 (13 April 2015)

Andriej Kapaś (pronounced [ˈandrjɛj ˈkapaɕ]; born 11 August 1989) is a Polish professional tennis player. He competes mainly on the ATP Challenger Tour and ITF Futures, both in singles and doubles. He reached his highest ATP singles ranking, No. 323, and his highest ATP doubles ranking, No. 163, on 6 April 2015.

== Career finals ==
=== Singles: 2 (1 title, 1 runners-up) ===
Legend Challengers (0–0) Futures (1–1)	Titles by surface Hard (1–0) Clay (0–0) Grass (0–0)

Outcome	No.	Date	Tournament	Surface	Opponent	Score
Winner	1.	27 November 2011	Opava, F5	Carpet (i)	(Czech Republic) Michal Konečný	7–6^{(7–5)}, 6–7^{(7–9)}, 6–4

=== Doubles: 3 (1 title, 2 runners-up) ===
Legend ATP Challengers (1–2)	Finals by surface Hard (0–1) Clay (1–1) Grass (0–0)

Outcome	No.	Date	Tournament	Surface	Partnering	Opponents in the final	Score
Winner	1.	18 September 2011	Szczecin, Poland	Clay	(Poland) Marcin Gawron	(Kazakhstan) Andrey Golubev (Kazakhstan) Yuri Schukin	6–3, 6–4
Runner-up	1.	14 June 2014	Košice, Slovakia	Clay	(Poland) Błażej Koniusz	(Argentina) Facundo Argüello (Uruguay) Ariel Behar	4–6, 6–7^{(4–7)}
Runner-up	2.	22 February 2015	Wrocław, Poland	Hard (i)	(Canada) Frank Dancevic	(Germany) Philipp Petzschner (Germany) Tim Pütz	6–7^{(4–7)}, 3–6
