= Marcin Gawron =

Polish tennis player

- Country (sports): Poland
- Born: 25 May 1988 (age 37) Nowy Sącz, Poland
- Plays: Right-handed (two-handed backhand)
- Prize money: $156,176

Singles
- Career record: 0–1
- Career titles: 0
- Highest ranking: No. 262 (25 July 2011)

Grand Slam singles results
- US Open: Q1 (2011)

Doubles
- Career record: 0–2
- Career titles: 0
- Highest ranking: No. 268 (10 September 2012)
- Last updated on: 8 August 2021.

Marcin Gawron (Polish pronunciation: [ˈmart͡ɕin ˈɡavrɔn]; born 25 May 1988) is a Polish tennis player. He made the final of the 2006 Wimbledon Junior Championship, but lost to Thiemo de Bakker 2–6, 6–7^{(4–7)}. Featuring predominantly on the ITF Futures Circuit, he made occasional appearances on the ATP Challenger Tour. He reached two quarter-finals, at Szczecin (2008, l. Jerzy Janowicz) and Poznań (2012, l. Martín Alund).

== Junior Grand Slam finals ==
=== Singles: 1 (1 runner-up) ===
Result	Year	Tournament	Surface	Opponent	Score
Loss	2006	Wimbledon	Grass	(Netherlands) Thiemo de Bakker	2–6, 6–7^{(4–7)}

== ATP Challenger and ITF Futures finals ==
=== Singles: 22 (8–14) ===
Legend ATP Challenger (0–0) ITF Futures (8–14)	Finals by surface Hard (3–3) Clay (5–11) Grass (0–0) Carpet (0–0)

Result	W–L	Date	Tournament	Tier	Surface	Opponent	Score
Win	1–0	Sep 2007	Poland F9, Gdynia	Futures	Clay	(Monaco) Benjamin Balleret	7–5, 3–6, 6–2
Loss	1–1	Oct 2007	Mexico F8, Los Cabos	Futures	Hard	(Germany) Peter Gojowczyk	4–6, 6–7^{(3–7)}
Loss	1–2	Aug 2008	Latvia F1, Jūrmala	Futures	Clay	(Czech Republic) Roman Vögeli	0–6, 1–6
Loss	1–3	Aug 2008	Poland F5, Olsztyn	Futures	Clay	(Poland) Jerzy Janowicz	4–6, 2–6
Loss	1–4	Sep 2008	Poland F7, Wrocław	Futures	Clay	(Poland) Jerzy Janowicz	6–7^{(3–7)}, 2–6
Win	2–4	Oct 2008	Mexico F10, Monterrey	Futures	Hard	(Cuba) Ricardo Chile-Fonte	4–6, 6–1, 7–6^{(7–5)}
Loss	2–5	Nov 2008	Mexico F14, Ciudad Obregón	Futures	Clay	(Switzerland) Michael Lammer	0–3 ret,
Loss	2–6	Jun 2009	Poland F3, Koszalin	Futures	Clay	(Belarus) Uladzimir Ignatik	1–6, 6–4, 2–6
Loss	2–7	Aug 2009	Poland F4, Olsztyn	Futures	Clay	(Belarus) Uladzimir Ignatik	1–6, 3–6
Loss	2–8	Aug 2010	Slovakia F1, Piešťany	Futures	Clay	(France) Florian Reynet	1–6, 2–6
Win	3–8	Aug 2010	Slovakia F2, Piešťany	Futures	Clay	(Czech Republic) Marek Michalička	6–3, 6–1
Win	4–8	Aug 2010	Poland F6, Poznań	Futures	Clay	(United Kingdom) Alexander Slabinsky	6–3, 6–4
Win	5–8	Jan 2011	Turkey F3, Antalya	Futures	Hard	(Ukraine) Artem Smirnov	7–5, 5–7, 6–4
Win	6–8	Jun 2011	Poland F3, Koszalin	Futures	Clay	(Netherlands) Boy Westerhof	6–4, 6–2
Loss	6–9	Oct 2011	Great Britain F17, Cardiff	Futures	Hard	(Czech Republic) Jan Minar	7–6^{(7–3)}, 2–6, 6–7^{(3–7)}
Win	7–9	May 2012	Romania F1, Cluj	Futures	Clay	(Moldova) Radu Albot	6–1, 6–3
Win	8–9	Oct 2012	Kazakhstan F8, Almaty	Futures	Hard	(Ukraine) Denys Molchanov	7–5, 6–4
Loss	8–10	Jun 2014	Poland F1, Koszalin	Futures	Clay	(Poland) Grzegorz Panfil	5–7, 2–6
Loss	8–11	Aug 2015	Poland F2, Bydgoszcz	Futures	Clay	(France) Axel Michon	3–6, 4–6
Loss	8–12	Mar 2016	Italy F3, Sondrio	Futures	Hard	(Sweden) Markus Eriksson	3–6, 1–6
Loss	8–13	Jun 2016	Poland F4, Warsaw	Futures	Clay	(Hungary) Péter Nagy	4–6, 6–0, 4–6
Loss	8–14	Sep 2017	Poland F11, Koszalin	Futures	Clay	(Poland) Pawel Cias	4–6, 3–6

=== Doubles: 33 (19–14) ===
Legend ATP Challenger (2–0) ITF Futures (17–14)	Finals by surface Hard (2–3) Clay (14–11) Grass (0–0) Carpet (3–0)

Result	W–L	Date	Tournament	Tier	Surface	Partner	Opponents	Score
Loss	0–1	Aug 2007	Poland F5, Olsztyn	Futures	Clay	(Poland) Dawid Celt	(Poland) Błażej Koniusz (Poland) Mateusz Kowalczyk	4–6, 2–6
Win	1–1	Jan 2008	Austria F1, Bergheim	Futures	Carpet	(Poland) Błażej Koniusz	(Italy) Massimo Dell'Acqua (Italy) Luca Vanni	6–3, 7–6^{(7–0)}
Win	2–1	May 2008	Poland F1, Katowice	Futures	Clay	(Poland) Grzegorz Panfil	(Poland) Błażej Koniusz (Poland) Mateusz Kowalczyk	6–2, 4–6, [10–5]
Win	3–1	Jun 2008	Bytom, Poland	Challenger	Clay	(Poland) Mateusz Kowalczyk	(Poland) Błażej Koniusz (Australia) Raphael Durek	6–4, 3–6, [10–7]
Win	4–1	Aug 2008	Latvia F1, Jūrmala	Futures	Clay	(Poland) Andriej Kapaś	(Latvia) Deniss Pavlovs (Latvia) Pjotrs Necajevs	6–3, 7–6^{(7–4)}
Loss	4–2	Aug 2008	Poland F6, Poznań	Futures	Clay	(Poland) Maciej Diłaj	(Poland) Mateusz Szmigiel (Slovakia) Mario Trnovsky	4–6, 6–7^{(4–7)}
Win	5–2	Oct 2008	Mexico F10, Monterrey	Futures	Hard	(Poland) Mateusz Kowalczyk	(United States) James Ludlow (France) Antoine Tassart	2–6, 6–4, [10–5]
Loss	5–3	Jun 2009	Poland F3, Koszalin	Futures	Clay	(Poland) Maciej Diłaj	(Germany) Martin Emmrich (Germany) Lars Pörschke	6–7^{(6–8)}, 3–6
Win	6–3	Nov 2009	Iran F7, Kish Island	Futures	Clay	(Poland) Grzegorz Panfil	(Russia) Andrey Kumantsov (Serbia) David Savić	3–6, 6–2, [10–4]
Loss	6–4	Nov 2009	Iran F8, Kish Island	Futures	Clay	(Poland) Grzegorz Panfil	(Russia) Andrey Kumantsov (Serbia) David Savić	7–6^{(9–7)}, 3–6, [5–10]
Win	7–4	Mar 2010	Switzerland F1, Taverne	Futures	Carpet	(Poland) Dawid Olejniczak	(France) Jeremy Blandin (Switzerland) Alexander Sadecky	6–1, 7–6^{(7–5)}
Win	8–4	May 2010	Poland F2, Kraków	Futures	Clay	(Poland) Andriej Kapaś	(Poland) Grzegorz Panfil (Poland) Błażej Koniusz	3–6, 6–0, [10–7]
Win	9–4	Nov 2010	Czech Republic F4, Rožnov pod Radhoštěm	Futures	Carpet	(Russia) Denis Matsukevich	(Czech Republic) Roman Jebavý (Czech Republic) Jan Mertl	6–3, 7–6^{(7–5)}
Win	10–4	May 2011	Bulgaria F1, Varna	Futures	Clay	(Poland) Grzegorz Panfil	(Romania) Alexandru-Daniel Carpen (Romania) Adrian Cruciat	7–5, 6–2
Loss	10–5	May 2011	Bulgaria F2, Plovdiv	Futures	Clay	(Austria) Michael Linzer	(Germany) Matthias Kolbe (Germany) Steven Moneke	3–6, 4–6
Loss	10–6	May 2011	Poland F2, Kraków	Futures	Clay	(Poland) Grzegorz Panfil	(Slovakia) Kamil Čapkovič (Chile) Hans Podlipnik Castillo	walkover
Win	11–6	Sep 2011	Szczecin, Poland	Challenger	Clay	(Poland) Andriej Kapaś	(Kazakhstan) Andrey Golubev (Kazakhstan) Yuri Schukin	6–4, 6–3
Loss	11–7	Feb 2012	France F3, Feucherolles	Futures	Hard	(Poland) Andriej Kapaś	(Spain) Ivan Arenas-Guald (Spain) Enrique López Pérez	7–5, 6–7^{(2–7)}, [8–10]
Win	12–7	Aug 2012	Poland F5, Poznań	Futures	Clay	(Poland) Andriej Kapaś	(Poland) Tomasz Bednarek (Poland) Mateusz Kowalczyk	6–7^{(3–7)}, 6–2, [10–7]
Win	13–7	Sep 2012	Poland F6, Legnica	Futures	Clay	(Poland) Grzegorz Panfil	(Czech Republic) Adam Pavlásek (Czech Republic) Jan Šátral	walkover
Win	14–7	Oct 2012	Germany F18, Leimen	Futures	Hard	(Poland) Grzegorz Panfil	(Germany) Sascha Lehmann (Chile) Laslo Urrutia Fuentes	6–3, 6–4
Loss	14–8	Oct 2012	Kazakhstan F8, Almaty	Futures	Hard	(Poland) Andriej Kapaś	(Germany) Jaan-Frederik Brunken (Ukraine) Denys Molchanov	6–3, 0–6, [7–10]
Loss	14–9	May 2013	Romania F1, Cluj	Futures	Clay	(Poland) Andriej Kapaś	(France) Romain Arneodo (Monaco) Benjamin Balleret	6–0, 4–6, [8–10]
Win	15–9	Mar 2014	Egypt F11, Sharm El Sheikh	Futures	Clay	(Poland) Andriej Kapaś	(Egypt) Mazen Osama (Egypt) Issam Haitham Taweel	4–6, 6–4, [10–2]
Loss	15–10	Jun 2014	Czech Republic F3, Jablonec nad Nisou	Futures	Clay	(Poland) Grzegorz Panfil	(Czech Republic) Marek Michalička (Czech Republic) Dominik Suc	6–3, 4–6, [3–10]
Loss	15–11	Jun 2014	Poland F1, Koszalin	Futures	Clay	(Poland) Grzegorz Panfil	(Chile) Cristóbal Saavedra Corvalán (Chile) Ricardo Urzua-Rivera	7–6^{(7–3)}, 5–7, [8–10]
Win	16–11	Sep 2014	Poland F7, Piekary Śląskie	Futures	Clay	(Poland) Błażej Koniusz	(Poland) Piotr Gadomski (Poland) Maciej Smola	7–6^{(7–4)}, 4–6, [10–3]
Loss	16–12	Jan 2015	Tunisia F2, Kantaoui	Futures	Hard	(Poland) Andriej Kapaś	(Italy) Claudio Grassi (Italy) Matteo Volante	7–6^{(8–6)}, 3–6, [8–10]
Win	17–12	Aug 2015	Poland F1, Koszalin	Futures	Clay	(Poland) Grzegorz Panfil	(Czech Republic) Zdeněk Kolář (Czech Republic) Petr Michnev	6–0, 6–4
Win	18–12	Jun 2016	Poland F4, Warsaw	Futures	Clay	(Poland) Grzegorz Panfil	(Russia) Alexander Igoshin (Russia) Alexander Zhurbin	6–4, 6–3
Win	19–12	Aug 2016	Poland F6, Poznań	Futures	Clay	(Poland) Andriej Kapaś	(Poland) Adam Majchrowicz (Poland) Szymon Walków	6–4, 7–5
Loss	19–13	Oct 2016	Hungary F7, Balatonboglar	Futures	Clay	(Poland) Pawel Cias	(Poland) Mateusz Kowalczyk (Poland) Grzegorz Panfil	2–6, 7–6^{(7–4)}, [4–10]
Loss	19–14	Sep 2017	Poland F11, Koszalin	Futures	Clay	(Poland) Michal Dembek	(Ecuador) Iván Endara (Poland) Szymon Walków	3–6, 6–2, [7–10]
