= 2018 Poznań Open – Singles =

Singles
- 2018 Poznań Open

Final
- Champion: (Poland) Hubert Hurkacz
- Runner-up: (Japan) Taro Daniel
- Score: 6–1, 6–1

Events
Singles	Doubles
← 2017 ·	Poznań Open	· 2019 →

Alexey Vatutin was the defending champion but lost in the quarterfinals to Hubert Hurkacz.

Hurkacz won the title after defeating Taro Daniel 6–1, 6–1 in the final.

== Seeds ==
1. (Japan) Taro Daniel (final)
2. (Argentina) Guido Andreozzi (first round)
3. (Slovakia) Martin Kližan (second round)
4. (Portugal) Pedro Sousa (first round)
5. (Spain) Marcel Granollers (second round)
6. (France) Quentin Halys (semifinals)
7. (Switzerland) Henri Laaksonen (second round)
8. (Russia) Alexey Vatutin (quarterfinals)

== Draw ==
=== Key ===
- Q = Qualifier
- WC = Wild card
- LL = Lucky loser
- Alt = Alternate
- SE = Special exempt
- PR = Protected ranking
- ITF = ITF entry
- JE = Junior exempt
- w/o = Walkover
- r = Retired
- d = Defaulted
- SR = Special ranking

=== Finals ===
Semifinals
1	(Japan) Taro Daniel	7^{8}	6
6	(France) Quentin Halys	6^{6}	3
(Italy) Alessandro Giannessi	4	6	3
(Poland) Hubert Hurkacz	6	3	6

Final
1	(Japan) Taro Daniel	1	1
(Poland) Hubert Hurkacz	6	6

=== Top half ===
First round
1	(Japan) T Daniel	7	6
(Serbia) M Kecmanović	5	3
Alt	(Bosnia and Herzegovina) T Brkić	1	4
Q	(France) M Bourgue	6	6
(Argentina) F Bagnis	6	7
(Slovakia) J Kovalík	3	5
(Ecuador) R Quiroz	2	7	3
5/WC	(Spain) M Granollers	6	5	6
3	(Slovakia) M Kližan	6	6
Alt	(United States) M Krueger	2	2
(Germany) O Otte	2	6	3
Q	(Italy) A Arnaboldi	6	3	6
Q	(France) A Escoffier	6	6
(Australia) A Santillan	4	3
WC	(Romania) VV Cornea	1	4
6	(France) Q Halys	6	6

Second round
1	(Japan) T Daniel	6	6
Q	(France) M Bourgue	4	2
(Argentina) F Bagnis	6	7^{7}
5/WC	(Spain) M Granollers	1	6^{4}
3	(Slovakia) M Kližan	3	3
Q	(Italy) A Arnaboldi	6	6
Q	(France) A Escoffier	6^{3}	7	4
6	(France) Q Halys	7^{7}	5	6

Quarterfinals
1	(Japan) T Daniel	6	7
(Argentina) F Bagnis	4	5
Q	(Italy) A Arnaboldi	1	6^{3}
6	(France) Q Halys	6	7^{7}

Semifinals
1	(Japan) T Daniel	7^{8}	6
6	(France) Q Halys	6^{6}	3

=== Bottom half ===
First round
7	(Switzerland) H Laaksonen	6	6
(Australia) J Kubler	4	2
(Austria) D Novak	3	2
(Hungary) A Balázs	6	6
WC	(Poland) Paweł Ciaś	3	6	4
(Dominican Republic) V Estrella Burgos	6	1	6
(Italy) A Giannessi	6	6
4	(Portugal) P Sousa	2	3
8	(Russia) A Vatutin	6	6
(France) K de Schepper	2	4
Q	(Germany) Jeremy Jahn	6	2	6
(Poland) K Majchrzak	3	6	0
WC	(Poland) Michał Dembek	6^{4}	3
(Italy) M Donati	7^{7}	6
(Poland) H Hurkacz	6	7
2	(Argentina) G Andreozzi	1	5

Second round
7	(Switzerland) H Laaksonen	0	1
(Hungary) A Balázs	6	6
(Dominican Republic) V Estrella Burgos	6	3	3
(Italy) A Giannessi	4	6	6
8	(Russia) A Vatutin	7^{7}	4	6
Q	(Germany) J Jahn	6^{4}	6	3
(Italy) M Donati	3	7^{7}	3
(Poland) H Hurkacz	6	6^{5}	6

Quarterfinals
(Hungary) A Balázs	4	5
(Italy) A Giannessi	6	7
8	(Russia) A Vatutin	3	2
(Poland) H Hurkacz	6	6

Semifinals
(Italy) A Giannessi	4	6	3
(Poland) H Hurkacz	6	3	6
