= 2018 Poznań Open =

- Date: 5–10 June
- Edition: 15th
- Surface: Clay
- Location: Poznań, Poland
- Venue: Park Tenisowy Olimpia

Champions

Singles
- (Poland) Hubert Hurkacz

Doubles
- (Poland) Mateusz Kowalczyk / (Poland) Szymon Walków
← 2017 ·	Poznań Open	· 2019 →

The 2018 Poznań Open was a professional tennis tournament played on clay courts. It was the fifteenth edition of the tournament which was part of the 2018 ATP Challenger Tour. It took place at the Park Tenisowy Olimpia in Poznań, Poland from 5 to 10 June 2018.

== Singles main-draw entrants ==
=== Seeds ===
Country	Player	Rank^{1}	Seed
JPN	Taro Daniel	82	1
ARG	Guido Andreozzi	108	2
SVK	Martin Kližan	117	3
POR	Pedro Sousa	120	4
ESP	Marcel Granollers	132	5
FRA	Quentin Halys	135	6
SUI	Henri Laaksonen	137	7
RUS	Alexey Vatutin	140	8

- ^{1} Rankings are as of 28 May 2018.

=== Other entrants ===
The following players received wildcards into the singles main draw:

- (Poland) Paweł Ciaś
- (Romania) Victor Vlad Cornea
- (Poland) Michał Dembek
- (Spain) Marcel Granollers

The following players received entry into the singles main draw as alternates:

- (Bosnia and Herzegovina) Tomislav Brkić
- (United States) Mitchell Krueger

The following players received entry from the qualifying draw:

- (Italy) Andrea Arnaboldi
- (France) Mathias Bourgue
- (France) Antoine Escoffier
- (Germany) Jeremy Jahn

== Champions ==
=== Singles ===
- (Poland) Hubert Hurkacz def. (Japan) Taro Daniel 6–1, 6–1.

=== Doubles ===
- (Poland) Mateusz Kowalczyk / (Poland) Szymon Walków def. (Hungary) Attila Balázs / (Italy) Andrea Vavassori 7–5, 6–7^{(8–10)}, [10–8].
