= 2018 Poznań Open – Doubles =

Doubles
- 2018 Poznań Open

Final
- Champions: (Poland) Mateusz Kowalczyk (Poland) Szymon Walków
- Runners-up: (Hungary) Attila Balázs (Italy) Andrea Vavassori
- Score: 7–5, 6–7^{(8–10)}, [10–8]

Events
Singles	Doubles
← 2017 ·	Poznań Open	· 2019 →

Guido Andreozzi and Jaume Munar were the defending champions but only Andreozzi chose to defend his title, partnering Ariel Behar. Andreozzi lost in the first round to Roberto Maytín and Nathan Pasha.

Mateusz Kowalczyk and Szymon Walków won the title after defeating Attila Balázs and Andrea Vavassori 7–5, 6–7^{(8–10)}, [10–8] in the final.

== Seeds ==
1. (Monaco) Romain Arneodo / (Austria) Tristan-Samuel Weissborn (first round)
2. (Argentina) Guido Andreozzi / (Uruguay) Ariel Behar (first round)
3. (Poland) Tomasz Bednarek / (Italy) Alessandro Motti (first round)
4. (Hungary) Attila Balázs / (Italy) Andrea Vavassori (final)

== Draw ==
=== Key ===
- Q = Qualifier
- WC = Wild card
- LL = Lucky loser
- Alt = Alternate
- SE = Special exempt
- PR = Protected ranking
- ITF = ITF entry
- JE = Junior exempt
- w/o = Walkover
- r = Retired
- d = Defaulted
- SR = Special ranking

First round
1	(Monaco) R Arneodo (Austria) T-S Weissborn	6^{3}	3
(Switzerland) H Laanksonen (Poland) G Panfil	7^{7}	6
WC	(Poland) M Kowalczyk (Poland) S Walków	7^{7}	6
(Japan) T Daniel (Spain) B Zapata Miralles	6^{5}	1
3	(Poland) T Bednarek (Italy) A Motti	2	6^{3}
WC	(Poland) Michał Dembek (Poland) J Zieliński	6	7^{7}
WC	(Romania) VV Cornea (Poland) K Drzewiecki	4	5
(Dominican Republic) V Estrella Burgos (Ecuador) R Quiroz	6	7
(Brazil) F Neis (Portugal) P Sousa	6	4	[10]
(Italy) A Giannessi (France) Q Halys	1	6	[7]
(Argentina) F Bagnis (Peru) S Galdós	4	4
4	(Hungary) A Balázs (Italy) A Vavassori	6	6
(Ukraine) V Uzhylovskyi (Russia) A Vatutin	3	6^{1}
(Germany) O Otte (Sweden) A Siljeström	6	7^{7}
(Venezuela) R Maytín (United States) N Pasha	7^{7}	1	[10]
2	(Argentina) G Andreozzi (Uruguay) A Behar	6^{5}	6	[8]

Quarterfinals
(Switzerland) H Laanksonen (Poland) G Panfil	5	6	[8]
WC	(Poland) M Kowalczyk (Poland) S Walków	7	3	[10]
WC	(Poland) M Dembek (Poland) J Zieliński	6	6
(Dominican Republic) V Estrella Burgos (Ecuador) R Quiroz	4	3
(Brazil) F Neis (Portugal) P Sousa	4	2
4	(Hungary) A Balázs (Italy) A Vavassori	6	6
(Germany) O Otte (Sweden) A Siljeström
(Venezuela) R Maytín (United States) N Pasha	w/o

Semifinals
WC	(Poland) M Kowalczyk (Poland) S Walków	7^{7}	6
WC	(Poland) M Dembek (Poland) J Zieliński	6^{5}	3
4	(Hungary) A Balázs (Italy) A Vavassori	6	7^{7}
(Venezuela) R Maytín (United States) N Pasha	4	6^{3}

Final
WC	(Poland) M Kowalczyk (Poland) S Walków	7	6^{8}	[10]
4	(Hungary) A Balázs (Italy) A Vavassori	5	7^{10}	[8]
