= 2016 Poznań Open – Doubles =

Doubles
- 2016 Poznań Open

Final
- Champions: (Georgia (country)) Aleksandre Metreveli (Chinese Taipei) Peng Hsien-yin
- Runners-up: (Poland) Mateusz Kowalczyk (Poland) Kamil Majchrzak
- Score: 6–4, 3–6, [10–8]

Events
Singles	Doubles
← 2015 ·	Poznań Open	· 2017 →

Mikhail Elgin and Mateusz Kowalczyk were the defending champions, but only Kowalczyk chose to participate, partnering Kamil Majchrzak. Kowalczyk and Majchrzak lost in the final to Aleksandre Metreveli and Peng Hsien-yin 6–4, 3–6, [10–8].

== Seeds ==
1. (United States) James Cerretani / (United States) Max Schnur (semifinals)
2. (Poland) Tomasz Bednarek / (Belarus) Sergey Betov (first round)
3. (Georgia (country)) Aleksandre Metreveli / (Chinese Taipei) Peng Hsien-yin (champions)
4. (Netherlands) Sander Arends / (Germany) Andreas Mies (first round)

== Draw ==
Key

- Q = Qualifier
- WC = Wild card
- LL = Lucky loser
- Alt = Alternate
- ITF = ITF entry
- PR = Protected ranking
- SR = Special ranking
- SE = Special exempt
- JE = Junior exempt
- JR = Junior Accelerator Programme entrant
- CO = College Accelerator Programme entrant
- NG = Next Gen Accelerator Program entrant
- w/o = Walkover
- r = Retired
- d = Defaulted

First round
1	(United States) J Cerretani (United States) M Schnur	6	6
WC	(Poland) Michał Dembek (Poland) G Panfil	0	2
(Spain) D Pérez Sanz (Portugal) FF Silva	3	6	[21]
Q	(Poland) H Hurkacz (Poland) J Zieliński	6	0	[19]
4	(Netherlands) S Arends (Germany) A Mies	4	1
(Poland) M Kowalczyk (Poland) K Majchrzak	6	6
WC	(Romania) V-M Anagnastopol (Romania) VV Cornea	6^{5}	4
(Croatia) I Sabanov (Croatia) M Sabanov	7^{7}	6
WC	(Poland) P Matuszewski (Poland) K Żuk	5	1
(Kazakhstan) A Nedovyesov (France) A Sidorenko	7	6
LL	(Poland) M Gawron (Poland) A Majchrowicz	4	2
3	(Georgia (country)) A Metreveli (Chinese Taipei) H-y Peng	6	6
(France) S Doumbia (France) G Sakharov	6	6
(Czech Republic) M Michalička (Czech Republic) Robin Staněk	4	3
(Serbia) P Krstin (Serbia) N Milojević	6	6
2	(Poland) T Bednarek (Belarus) S Betov	4	4

Quarterfinals
1	(United States) J Cerretani (United States) M Schnur	7^{7}	6
(Spain) D Pérez Sanz (Portugal) FF Silva	6^{5}	4
(Poland) M Kowalczyk (Poland) K Majchrzak	6	7^{7}
(Croatia) I Sabanov (Croatia) M Sabanov	4	6^{1}
(Kazakhstan) A Nedovyesov (France) A Sidorenko	2	5
3	(Georgia (country)) A Metreveli (Chinese Taipei) H-y Peng	6	7
(France) S Doumbia (France) G Sakharov	w/o
(Serbia) P Krstin (Serbia) N Milojević

Semifinals
1	(United States) J Cerretani (United States) M Schnur	5	4
(Poland) M Kowalczyk (Poland) K Majchrzak	7	6
3	(Georgia (country)) A Metreveli (Chinese Taipei) H-y Peng	6	6
(France) S Doumbia (France) G Sakharov	1	2

Final
(Poland) M Kowalczyk (Poland) K Majchrzak	4	6	[8]
3	(Georgia (country)) A Metreveli (Chinese Taipei) H-y Peng	6	3	[10]
