= 2017 Open BNP Paribas Banque de Bretagne – Singles =

Singles
- 2017 Open BNP Paribas Banque de Bretagne

Final
- Champion: (France) Adrian Mannarino
- Runner-up: (Germany) Peter Gojowczyk
- Score: 6–4, 6–4

Events
Singles	Doubles
← 2016 ·	Open BNP Paribas Banque de Bretagne	· 2018 →

Andrey Rublev was the defending champion but lost in the semifinals to Peter Gojowczyk.

Adrian Mannarino won the title after defeating Gojowczyk 6–4, 6–4 in the final.

== Seeds ==
1. (France) Adrian Mannarino (champion)
2. (France) Jérémy Chardy (withdrew)
3. (Ukraine) Sergiy Stakhovsky (quarterfinals)
4. (Russia) Evgeny Donskoy (first round)
5. (France) Julien Benneteau (second round)
6. (France) Vincent Millot (first round)
7. (Russia) Andrey Rublev (semifinals)
8. (Germany) Peter Gojowczyk (final)

== Draw ==
=== Key ===
- Q = Qualifier
- WC = Wild card
- LL = Lucky loser
- Alt = Alternate
- SE = Special exempt
- PR = Protected ranking
- ITF = ITF entry
- JE = Junior exempt
- w/o = Walkover
- r = Retired
- d = Defaulted
- SR = Special ranking

=== Finals ===
Semifinals
1	(France) Adrian Mannarino	7	6
(France) Quentin Halys	5	4
8	(Germany) Peter Gojowczyk	7^{7}	4	6
7	(Russia) Andrey Rublev	6^{5}	6	3

Final
1	(France) Adrian Mannarino	6	6
8	(Germany) Peter Gojowczyk	4	4

=== Top half ===
First round
1	(France) A Mannarino	6	7
WC	(France) E Furness	3	5
(Belgium) Y Reuter	2	3
WC	(Poland) J Janowicz	6	6
Q	(France) G Sakharov	6	6
(Belarus) U Ignatik	3	3
WC	(France) G Blancaneaux	2	4
5	(France) J Benneteau	6	6
4	(Russia) E Donskoy	5	3
(Russia) T Gabashvili	7	6
(France) Q Halys	7^{8}	6
(Serbia) M Zekić	6^{6}	1
PR	(Austria) J Melzer	3	4
(Italy) S Napolitano	6	6
Q	(Russia) A Karatsev	6	6
6	(France) V Millot	3	4

Second round
1	(France) A Mannarino	6	3	6
WC	(Poland) J Janowicz	4	6	4
Q	(France) G Sakharov	3	6	7^{7}
5	(France) J Benneteau	6	4	6^{4}
(Russia) T Gabashvili	3	4
(France) Q Halys	6	6
(Italy) S Napolitano	3	5
Q	(Russia) A Karatsev	6	7

Quarterfinals
1	(France) A Mannarino	6	6
Q	(France) G Sakharov	4	4
(France) Q Halys	7^{7}	7^{7}
Q	(Russia) A Karatsev	6^{5}	6^{4}

Semifinals
1	(France) A Mannarino	7	6
(France) Q Halys	5	4

=== Bottom half ===
First round
8	(Germany) P Gojowczyk	6	6
WC	(France) M Hamou	2	4
(Canada) S Diez	6	6
(Spain) J Samper-Montaña	4	2
(Spain) E López-Pérez	6	7^{9}
(Serbia) M Tepavac	4	6^{7}
Q	(France) C Hemery	6^{4}	6	2
3	(Ukraine) S Stakhovsky	7^{7}	4	6
7	(Russia) A Rublev	6	3	7^{9}
(Greece) S Tsitsipas	2	6	6^{7}
(Japan) H Moriya	5	2
Q	(France) H Nys	7	6
(France) T Lamasine	4	6	6
(Serbia) L Đere	6	4	2
(France) M Bourgue	7^{7}	6
LL	(France) G Jacq	6^{3}	2

Second round
8	(Germany) P Gojowczyk	6	6^{2}	6
(Canada) S Diez	2	7^{7}	4
(Spain) E López-Pérez	6	5	3
3	(Ukraine) S Stakhovsky	4	7	6
7	(Russia) A Rublev	6	6^{3}	6
Q	(France) H Nys	4	7^{7}	3
(France) T Lamasine	6	6
(France) M Bourgue	2	1

Quarterfinals
8	(Germany) P Gojowczyk	7	7^{7}
3	(Ukraine) S Stakhovsky	5	6^{4}
7	(Russia) A Rublev	6	6
(France) T Lamasine	4	4

Semifinals
8	(Germany) P Gojowczyk	7^{7}	4	6
7	(Russia) A Rublev	6^{5}	6	3
