= 2019 Open BNP Paribas Banque de Bretagne – Singles =

Singles
- 2019 Open BNP Paribas Banque de Bretagne

Final
- Champion: (France) Grégoire Barrère
- Runner-up: (United Kingdom) Dan Evans
- Score: 4–6, 6–2, 6–3

Events
Singles	Doubles
← 2018 ·	Open BNP Paribas Banque de Bretagne	· 2020 →

Quentin Halys was the defending champion but lost in the second round to Dan Evans.

Grégoire Barrère won the title after defeating Evans 4–6, 6–2, 6–3 in the final.

== Seeds ==
All seeds receive a bye into the second round.

1. (Poland) Hubert Hurkacz (third round)
2. (France) Ugo Humbert (semifinals)
3. (Spain) Marcel Granollers (second round)
4. (Lithuania) Ričardas Berankis (second round)
5. (France) Quentin Halys (second round)
6. (Germany) Matthias Bachinger (quarterfinals)
7. (Spain) Adrián Menéndez Maceiras (third round)
8. (Ukraine) Sergiy Stakhovsky (third round)
9. (France) Constant Lestienne (third round)
10. (Estonia) Jürgen Zopp (quarterfinals)
11. (France) Antoine Hoang (withdrew)
12. (Italy) Salvatore Caruso (second round)
13. (Germany) Mats Moraing (second round)
14. (Belarus) Egor Gerasimov (second round)
15. (France) Grégoire Barrère (champion)
16. (Italy) Filippo Baldi (second round)

== Draw ==
=== Key ===
- Q = Qualifier
- WC = Wild card
- LL = Lucky loser
- Alt = Alternate
- SE = Special exempt
- PR = Protected ranking
- ITF = ITF entry
- JE = Junior exempt
- w/o = Walkover
- r = Retired
- d = Defaulted
- SR = Special ranking

=== Finals ===
Quarterfinals
15	(France) Grégoire Barrère	6	7^{7}
10	(Estonia) Jürgen Zopp	3	6^{3}
(France) Mathias Bourgue	4	6	6
6	(Germany) Matthias Bachinger	6	3	2
(United Kingdom) Dan Evans	3	6	7^{7}
ITF	(Russia) Roman Safiullin	6	3	6^{1}
(Germany) Tobias Kamke	7^{8}	2	4
2	(France) Ugo Humbert	6^{6}	6	6

Semifinals
15	(France) Grégoire Barrère	6	6
(France) Mathias Bourgue	4	4
(United Kingdom) Dan Evans	6	6
2	(France) Ugo Humbert	2	4

Final
15	(France) Grégoire Barrère	4	6	6
(United Kingdom) Dan Evans	6	2	3

=== Top half ===
==== Section 1 ====
First round
(Russia) A Vatutin	7	6
(France) E Benchetrit	5	4
(France) C Hemery	6	7^{7}
WC	(France) E Furness	3	6^{5}
ITF	(Spain) J Barranco Cosano	4	6	6
LL	(France) Quentin Gueydan	6	2	4
WC	(France) Antoine Cornut-Chauvinc	1	6	5
Q	(France) G Jacq	6	2	7

Second round
1	(Poland) H Hurkacz	7^{7}	7
(Russia) A Vatutin	6^{3}	5
(France) C Hemery	6^{5}	6	6^{1}
15	(France) G Barrère	7^{7}	2	7^{7}
10	(Estonia) J Zopp	6	7^{7}
ITF	(Spain) J Barranco Cosano	1	6^{5}
Q	(France) G Jacq	0	6^{1}
7	(Spain) A Menéndez Maceiras	6	7^{7}

Third round
1	(Poland) H Hurkacz	6^{2}	7^{7}	1
15	(France) G Barrère	7^{7}	6^{5}	6
10	(Estonia) J Zopp	6	7^{7}
7	(Spain) A Menéndez Maceiras	2	6^{3}

Quarterfinals
15	(France) G Barrère	6	7^{7}
10	(Estonia) J Zopp	3	6^{3}

==== Section 2 ====
First round
(Russia) P Kotov	6^{6}	7	6
(Czech Republic) Z Kolář	7^{8}	5	3
(France) M Bourgue	4	7^{7}	6
(Spain) R Ortega Olmedo	6	6^{1}	4
(Germany) D Brands	6	7^{7}
WC	(France) H Gaston	2	6^{3}
(Netherlands) T de Bakker	4	7	6
ITF	(Russia) A Karatsev	6	5	0

Second round
3	(Spain) M Granollers	6	4	3
(Russia) P Kotov	4	6	6
(France) M Bourgue	2	6	6
14	(Belarus) E Gerasimov	6	2	4
12	(Italy) S Caruso	4	6^{4}
(Germany) D Brands	6	7^{7}
(Netherlands) T de Bakker	7^{9}	4	5
6	(Germany) M Bachinger	6^{7}	6	7

Third round
(Russia) P Kotov	5	4
(France) M Bourgue	7	6
(Germany) D Brands	7^{7}	6^{6}	3
6	(Germany) M Bachinger	6^{4}	7^{8}	6

Quarterfinals
(France) M Bourgue	4	6	6
6	(Germany) M Bachinger	6	3	2

=== Bottom half ===
==== Section 3 ====
First round
WC	(France) C Bittoun Kouzmine	3	0
(United Kingdom) D Evans	6	6
WC	(Belgium) S Darcis	2	6	4
Q	(France) M Guinard	6	3	6
(France) M Janvier	6	6^{8}	4
(France) A Müller	3	7^{10}	6
Alt	(France) H Nys	4	4
ITF	(Russia) R Safiullin	6	6

Second round
5	(France) Q Halys	6	4	6^{4}
(United Kingdom) D Evans	2	6	7^{7}
Q	(France) M Guinard	3	2
9	(France) C Lestienne	6	6
13	(Germany) M Moraing	6	6^{8}	6^{2}
(France) A Müller	3	7^{10}	7^{7}
ITF	(Russia) R Safiullin	6	7^{7}
4	(Lithuania) R Berankis	3	6^{4}

Third round
(United Kingdom) D Evans	3	7^{7}	7^{7}
9	(France) C Lestienne	6	6^{2}	6^{4}
(France) A Müller	4	6^{6}
ITF	(Russia) R Safiullin	6	7^{8}

Quarterfinals
(United Kingdom) D Evans	3	6	7^{7}
ITF	(Russia) R Safiullin	6	3	6^{1}

==== Section 4 ====
First round
(Italy) M Donati	3	4
(Austria) L Miedler	6	6
(Spain) D Gimeno Traver	2	4
(Germany) T Kamke	6	6
(Germany) O Otte	4	6	6
(Spain) B Zapata Miralles	6	4	3
ITF	(Italy) R Brancaccio	7	7^{7}
(Spain) C Taberner	5	6^{4}

Second round
8	(Ukraine) S Stakhovsky	6^{3}	7^{7}	7^{7}
(Austria) L Miedler	7^{7}	6^{2}	6^{4}
(Germany) T Kamke	6	6
Alt	(Italy) Fabrizio Ornago	0	4
16	(Italy) F Baldi	5	6	1
(Germany) O Otte	7	4	6
ITF	(Italy) R Brancaccio	4	6^{12}
2	(France) U Humbert	6	7^{14}

Third round
8	(Ukraine) S Stakhovsky	6	3	6^{5}
(Germany) T Kamke	3	6	7^{7}
(Germany) O Otte	4	4
2	(France) U Humbert	6	6

Quarterfinals
(Germany) T Kamke	7^{8}	2	4
2	(France) U Humbert	6^{6}	6	6
