= 2019 Poznań Open – Doubles =

Doubles
- 2019 Poznań Open

Final
- Champions: (Italy) Andrea Vavassori (Spain) David Vega Hernández
- Runners-up: (Spain) Pedro Martínez (Netherlands) Mark Vervoort
- Score: 6–4, 6–7^{(4–7)}, [10–6]

Events
Singles	Doubles
← 2018 ·	Poznań Open	· 2021 →

Mateusz Kowalczyk and Szymon Walków were the defending champions but only Walków chose to defend his title, partnering Karol Drzewiecki. Walków lost in the first round to Javier Barranco Cosano and Raúl Brancaccio.

Andrea Vavassori and David Vega Hernández won the title after defeating Pedro Martínez and Mark Vervoort 6–4, 6–7^{(4–7)}, [10–6] in the final.

== Seeds ==
1. (China) Gong Maoxin / (China) Zhang Ze (first round)
2. (United States) Nathaniel Lammons / (Brazil) Fernando Romboli (quarterfinals)
3. (Italy) Andrea Vavassori / (Spain) David Vega Hernández (champions)
4. (Australia) Rameez Junaid / (Spain) Enrique López Pérez (first round)

== Draw ==
=== Key ===
- Q = Qualifier
- WC = Wild card
- LL = Lucky loser
- Alt = Alternate
- SE = Special exempt
- PR = Protected ranking
- ITF = ITF entry
- JE = Junior exempt
- w/o = Walkover
- r = Retired
- d = Defaulted
- SR = Special ranking

First round
1	(China) M Gong (China) Ze Zhang	6	6^{1}	[7]
WC	(Poland) Michał Dembek (Romania) F Mergea	4	7^{7}	[10]
ITF	(Spain) S Martos Gornés (Italy) Pietro Rondoni	2	6	[7]
(Italy) S Bolelli (Italy) G Mager	6	3	[10]
3	(Italy) A Vavassori (Spain) D Vega Hernández	6	3	[18]
(Belgium) S Gillé (Netherlands) T Griekspoor	4	6	[16]
Alt	(Portugal) J Domingues (Russia) A Vatutin	6	5	[10]
WC	(Poland) M Matkowski (Poland) K Żuk	3	7	[4]
WC	(Poland) K Drzewiecki (Poland) S Walków	6^{3}	1
ITF	(Spain) J Barranco Cosano (Italy) R Brancaccio	7^{7}	6
(Spain) P Martínez (Netherlands) M Vervoort	7^{7}	6
4	(Australia) R Junaid (Spain) E López Pérez	6^{1}	4
(Sweden) A Siljeström (Sweden) E Ymer	3	7	[10]
(Austria) D Novak (Austria) S Ofner	6	5	[8]
(Peru) S Galdós (Portugal) P Sousa	6^{3}	3
2	(United States) N Lammons (Brazil) F Romboli	7^{7}	6

Quarterfinals
WC	(Poland) M Dembek (Romania) F Mergea	7^{7}	4	[10]
(Italy) S Bolelli (Italy) G Mager	6^{5}	6	[8]
3	(Italy) A Vavassori (Spain) D Vega Hernández	6	6
Alt	(Portugal) J Domingues (Russia) A Vatutin	1	1
ITF	(Spain) J Barranco Cosano (Italy) R Brancaccio	3	3
(Spain) P Martínez (Netherlands) M Vervoort	6	6
(Sweden) A Siljeström (Sweden) E Ymer	7^{7}	6
2	(United States) N Lammons (Brazil) F Romboli	6^{5}	3

Semifinals
WC	(Poland) M Dembek (Romania) F Mergea	2	6^{3}
3	(Italy) A Vavassori (Spain) D Vega Hernández	6	7^{7}
(Spain) P Martínez (Netherlands) M Vervoort	4	6	[10]
(Sweden) A Siljeström (Sweden) E Ymer	6	3	[2]

Final
3	(Italy) A Vavassori (Spain) D Vega Hernández	6	6^{4}	[10]
(Spain) P Martínez (Netherlands) M Vervoort	4	7^{7}	[6]
