= 2018 Open BNP Paribas Banque de Bretagne – Doubles =

Doubles
- 2018 Open BNP Paribas Banque de Bretagne

Final
- Champions: (United Kingdom) Ken Skupski (United Kingdom) Neal Skupski
- Runners-up: (Belgium) Sander Gillé (Belgium) Joran Vliegen
- Score: 6–3, 3–6, [10–7]

Events
Singles	Doubles
← 2017 ·	Open BNP Paribas Banque de Bretagne	· 2019 →

Mikhail Elgin and Igor Zelenay were the defending champions but chose not to defend their title.

Ken and Neal Skupski won the title after defeating Sander Gillé and Joran Vliegen 6–3, 3–6, [10–7] in the final.

== Seeds ==
1. (United Kingdom) Ken Skupski / (United Kingdom) Neal Skupski (champions)
2. (Netherlands) Sander Arends / (Croatia) Antonio Šančić (semifinals)
3. (Monaco) Romain Arneodo / (France) Hugo Nys (semifinals)
4. (Belgium) Sander Gillé / (Belgium) Joran Vliegen (final)

== Draw ==
=== Key ===
- Q = Qualifier
- WC = Wild card
- LL = Lucky loser
- Alt = Alternate
- ITF = ITF entry
- PR = Protected ranking
- SR = Special ranking
- SE = Special exempt
- JE = Junior exempt
- JR = Junior Accelerator Programme entrant
- CO = College Accelerator Programme entrant
- NG = Next Gen Accelerator Program entrant
- w/o = Walkover
- r = Retired
- d = Defaulted

First round
1	(United Kingdom) K Skupski (United Kingdom) N Skupski	6	6
(Croatia) I Sabanov (Croatia) M Sabanov	1	3
(United Kingdom) S Clayton (Netherlands) D Pel	7^{7}	6
Alt	(Italy) A Arnaboldi (Russia) T Gabashvili	6^{2}	1
3	(Monaco) R Arneodo (France) H Nys	7	6^{9}	[10]
(Germany) A Mies (United Kingdom) J O'Mara	5	7^{11}	[3]
(Australia) R Junaid (Japan) T Matsui	7	2	[10]
(Croatia) M Draganja (Croatia) T Draganja	5	6	[7]
(Belgium) A De Greef (Spain) R Ojeda Lara	3	4
WC	(France) G Barrère (France) J Eysseric	6	6
(India) S Balaji (India) V Vardhan	6^{5}	3
4	(Belgium) S Gillé (Belgium) J Vliegen	7^{7}	6
(Bosnia and Herzegovina) M Bašić (Bosnia and Herzegovina) A Šetkić	6	3	[10]
WC	(Greece) Pe Tsitsipas (Greece) S Tsitsipas	4	6	[7]
(France) M Bourgue (France) D Guez
2	(Netherlands) S Arends (Croatia) A Šančić	w/o

Quarterfinals
1	(United Kingdom) K Skupski (United Kingdom) N Skupski	6	7^{7}
(United Kingdom) S Clayton (Netherlands) D Pel	4	6^{5}
3	(Monaco) R Arneodo (France) H Nys	6	6
(Australia) R Junaid (Japan) T Matsui	1	2
WC	(France) G Barrère (France) J Eysseric	4	3
4	(Belgium) S Gillé (Belgium) J Vliegen	6	6
(Bosnia and Herzegovina) M Bašić (Bosnia and Herzegovina) A Šetkić	4	0
2	(Netherlands) S Arends (Croatia) A Šančić	6	6

Semifinals
1	(United Kingdom) K Skupski (United Kingdom) N Skupski	7^{7}	3	[10]
3	(Monaco) R Arneodo (France) H Nys	6^{2}	6	[8]
4	(Belgium) S Gillé (Belgium) J Vliegen	6	6
2	(Netherlands) S Arends (Croatia) A Šančić	1	4

Final
1	(United Kingdom) K Skupski (United Kingdom) N Skupski	6	3	[10]
4	(Belgium) S Gillé (Belgium) J Vliegen	3	6	[7]
