= 2016 Poznań Open =

- Date: 9 – 17 July
- Edition: 13th
- Draw: 32S/32Q/16D
- Prize money: €42,500+H
- Surface: Clay
- Location: Poznań, Poland
- Venue: Park Tenisowy Olimpia

Champions

Singles
- (Moldova) Radu Albot

Doubles
- (Georgia (country)) Aleksandre Metreveli / (Chinese Taipei) Peng Hsien-yin
← 2015 ·	Poznań Open	· 2017 →

The 2016 Poznań Open was a professional tennis tournament played on clay courts. It was the thirteenth edition of the tournament which was part of the 2016 ATP Challenger Tour. It took place at the Park Tenisowy Olimpia in Poznań, Poland from 9 to 11 July 2015, including the qualifying competition in the first two days.

For the first time in the tournament's history, evening sessions under floodlights were scheduled on rebuild centre court. The prize money has decreased to €42,500 + Hospitality, and because of calendar congestion caused by the 2016 Summer Olympics no top 100 player entered that year, which had not happened in Poznań Open before. However, when the tournament started, a top seeded Radu Albot was ranked 92.

Due to bad weather, some of the first round doubles matches were played indoors.

== Singles main-draw entrants ==
=== Seeds ===
Country	Player	Rank (Note: Ranking and seeding as of June 27, 2016)	Seed
MDA	Radu Albot	110	1
GER	Tobias Kamke	134	2
KAZ	Aleksandr Nedovyesov	177	3
SRB	Peđa Krstin	185	4
ESP	Pere Riba	198	5
ESP	Jordi Samper-Montaña	206	6
BEL	Kimmer Coppejans	211	7
~~NED~~	~~Antal van der Duim~~	~~224~~	~~8~~
SRB	Nikola Milojević	229	9

=== Other entrants ===
The following players received wildcards into the singles main draw:

- (Romania) Victor Vlad Cornea (Note: As part of the cooperation with BRD Sibiu Challenger)
- (Poland) Michał Dembek
- (Poland) Hubert Hurkacz
- (Poland) Kamil Majchrzak

The following players received entry from the qualifying draw:

- (Poland) Marcin Gawron
- (Belgium) Clément Geens
- (Portugal) Pedro Sousa
- (France) Tak Khunn Wang

The following player entered as lucky losers:

- (Belarus) Sergey Betov
- (France) Maxime Janvier

=== Withdrawals ===
During the tournament

- (Netherlands) Antal van der Duim (Note: Withdrawals occurred after the draw was made, Van der Duim and Karatsev were replaced by a Lucky Losers – Sergey Betov and Maxime Janvier)
- (Russia) Aslan Karatsev

== Doubles main-draw entrants ==
=== Seeds ===
Country	Player	Country	Player	Rank	Seed
USA	James Cerretani	USA	Max Schnur	232	1
POL	Tomasz Bednarek	BLR	Sergey Betov	233	2
GEO	Aleksandre Metreveli	TPE	Peng Hsien-yin	390	3
NED	Sander Arends	GER	Andreas Mies	427	4

=== Other entrants ===
The following pairs received wildcards into the doubles main draw:

- (Romania) Victor-Mugurel Anagnastopol / (Romania) Victor Vlad Cornea
- (Poland) Michał Dembek / (Poland) Grzegorz Panfil
- (Poland) Piotr Matuszewski / (Poland) Kacper Żuk

The following pair received entry from the qualifying draw:

- (Poland) Hubert Hurkacz / (Poland) Jan Zieliński

The following pair received entry as a lucky losers into the singles main draw:

- (Poland) Marcin Gawron / (Poland) Adam Majchrowicz

== Champions ==
=== Singles ===
- (Moldova) Radu Albot def. (Belgium) Clément Geens, 6–2, 6–4

=== Doubles ===
- (Georgia (country)) Aleksandre Metreveli / (Chinese Taipei) Peng Hsien-yin def. (Poland) Mateusz Kowalczyk / (Poland) Kamil Majchrzak, 6–4, 3–6, [10–8]
