= 2016 Poznań Open – Singles =

Singles
- 2016 Poznań Open

Final
- Champion: (Moldova) Radu Albot
- Runner-up: (Belgium) Clément Geens
- Score: 6–2, 6–4

Events
Singles	Doubles
← 2015 ·	Poznań Open	· 2017 →

Pablo Carreño Busta was the defending champion but chose not to participate.

Radu Albot won the title, beating Clément Geens in the final, 6–2, 6–4.

== Seeds ==
1. (Moldova) Radu Albot (champion)
2. (Germany) Tobias Kamke (first round)
3. (Kazakhstan) Aleksandr Nedovyesov (semifinals)
4. (Serbia) Peđa Krstin (second round)
5. (Spain) Pere Riba (quarterfinals)
6. (Spain) Jordi Samper Montaña (quarterfinals)
7. (Belgium) Kimmer Coppejans (semifinals)
8. (Netherlands) Antal van der Duim (withdrew)
9. (Serbia) Nikola Milojević (quarterfinals)

== Draw ==
=== Key ===
- Q = Qualifier
- WC = Wild card
- LL = Lucky loser
- Alt = Alternate
- SE = Special exempt
- PR = Protected ranking
- ITF = ITF entry
- JE = Junior exempt
- w/o = Walkover
- r = Retired
- d = Defaulted
- SR = Special ranking

=== Finals ===
Semifinals
1	(Moldova) Radu Albot	6	6
3	(Kazakhstan) Aleksandr Nedovyesov	1	2
7	(Belgium) Kimmer Coppejans	6^{6}	0
Q	(Belgium) Clément Geens	7^{8}	6

Final
1	(Moldova) Radu Albot	6	6
Q	(Belgium) Clément Geens	2	4

=== Top half ===
First round
1	(Moldova) R Albot	6	6
WC	(Poland) Michał Dembek	3	2
Q	(Portugal) P Sousa	7	6
(France) G Sakharov	5	1
(Czech Republic) M Michalička	7	6
WC	(Poland) K Majchrzak	5	0
(Portugal) FF Silva	1	6^{4}
5	(Spain) P Riba	6	7^{7}
3	(Kazakhstan) A Nedovyesov	6	4	6
LL	(France) M Janvier	4	6	4
Q	(Poland) M Gawron	6^{4}	2
(Spain) O Roca Batalla	7^{7}	6
(Serbia) M Zekić	2^{r}
(Spain) D Pérez Sanz	4
(Belgium) J De Loore	4	1
9	(Serbia) N Milojević	6	6

Second round
1	(Moldova) R Albot	6	6
Q	(Portugal) P Sousa	1	4
(Czech Republic) M Michalička	1	2
5	(Spain) P Riba	6	6
3	(Kazakhstan) A Nedovyesov	6	6
(Spain) O Roca Batalla	2	4
(Spain) D Pérez Sanz	4	6^{4}
9	(Serbia) N Milojević	6	7^{7}

Quarterfinals
1	(Moldova) R Albot	5	7	7^{9}
5	(Spain) P Riba	7	5	6^{7}
3	(Kazakhstan) A Nedovyesov	5	6	6
9	(Serbia) N Milojević	7	2	3

Semifinals
1	(Moldova) R Albot	6	6
3	(Kazakhstan) A Nedovyesov	1	2

=== Bottom half ===
First round
7	(Belgium) K Coppejans	6	6
LL	(Belarus) S Betov	3	1
WC	(Romania) VV Cornea	1	6^{6}
(Czech Republic) Robin Staněk	6	7^{8}
Q	(France) TK Wang	0	2
(Spain) R Ramírez Hidalgo	6	6
WC	(Poland) H Hurkacz	2	6	4
4	(Serbia) P Krstin	6	0	6
6	(Spain) J Samper-Montaña	6	2	6
(France) A Sidorenko	2	6	4
(Argentina) A Velotti	7^{7}	6
(Georgia (country)) A Metreveli	6^{2}	2
(Chile) C Garin	2	6	4
(United Kingdom) A Ward	6	2	1^{r}
Q	(Belgium) Clément Geens	6	6
2	(Germany) T Kamke	1	4

Second round
7	(Belgium) K Coppejans	6	6
(Czech Republic) R Staněk	1	0
(Spain) R Ramírez Hidalgo	6	6
4	(Serbia) P Krstin	3	1
6	(Spain) J Samper-Montaña	2	6	6
(Argentina) A Velotti	6	1	4
(Chile) C Garin	6^{5}	4
Q	(Belgium) C Geens	7^{7}	6

Quarterfinals
7	(Belgium) K Coppejans	6	6
(Spain) R Ramírez Hidalgo	4	1
6	(Spain) J Samper-Montaña	3	3
Q	(Belgium) C Geens	6	6

Semifinals
7	(Belgium) K Coppejans	6^{6}	0
Q	(Belgium) C Geens	7^{8}	6
