= 2014 Poznań Open – Doubles =

Doubles
- 2014 Poznań Open

Final
- Champions: (Moldova) Radu Albot (Czech Republic) Adam Pavlásek
- Runners-up: (Poland) Tomasz Bednarek (Finland) Henri Kontinen
- Score: 7–5, 2–6, [10–8]

Events
Singles	Doubles
← 2013 ·	Poznań Open	· 2015 →

Gero Kretschmer and Alexander Satschko were the defending champions, but they did not participate that year.
Radu Albot and Adam Pavlásek won the title, defeating Tomasz Bednarek and Henri Kontinen in the final, 7–5, 2–6, [10–8].

== Seeds ==
1. (Poland) Tomasz Bednarek / (Finland) Henri Kontinen (final)
2. (Sweden) Andreas Siljeström / (Slovakia) Igor Zelenay (semifinals)
3. (United States) James Cerretani / (Germany) Frank Moser (first round)
4. (Poland) Piotr Gadomski / (Netherlands) Wesley Koolhof (quarterfinals)

== Draw ==
=== Key ===
- Q = Qualifier
- WC = Wild card
- LL = Lucky loser
- Alt = Alternate
- SE = Special exempt
- PR = Protected ranking
- ITF = ITF entry
- JE = Junior exempt
- w/o = Walkover
- r = Retired
- d = Defaulted
- SR = Special ranking

=== Draw ===
First round
1	(Poland) T Bednarek (Finland) H Kontinen	7^{7}	2	[10]
WC	(Poland) M Kowalczyk (Poland) Maciej Smoła	6^{1}	6	[6]
(Puerto Rico) A Llompart (South Africa) D O'Brien	6	6
(Spain) I Cervantes (Spain) J Lizariturry	2	4
4	(Poland) Piotr Gadomski (Netherlands) W Koolhof	6	6
(Belgium) G Gigounon (Belgium) D Goffin	4	3
Q	(Poland) K Drzewiecki (Poland) Piotr Łomacki	2	1
(Brazil) R Dutra Silva (Venezuela) R Maytín	6	6
WC	(Poland) K Majchrzak (Poland) J Zieliński	5	5
(Netherlands) Romano Frantzen (Spain) E López-Pérez	7	7
(Moldova) R Albot (Czech Republic) A Pavlásek	6	6
3	(United States) J Cerretani (Germany) F Moser	3	1
WC	(Poland) M Gawron (Poland) G Panfil	6^{4}	2
(Poland) A Kapaś (Poland) B Koniusz	7^{7}	6
(Serbia) N Čačić (Bosnia and Herzegovina) D Džumhur	4	2
2	(Sweden) A Siljeström (Slovakia) I Zelenay	6	6

Quarterfinals
1	(Poland) T Bednarek (Finland) H Kontinen	6	3	[10]
(Puerto Rico) A Llompart (South Africa) D O'Brien	3	6	[6]
4	(Poland) P Gadomski (Netherlands) W Koolhof	3	6^{4}
(Brazil) R Dutra Silva (Venezuela) R Maytín	6	7^{7}
(Netherlands) R Frantzen (Spain) E López-Pérez	1	6^{5}
(Moldova) R Albot (Czech Republic) A Pavlásek	6	7^{7}
(Poland) A Kapaś (Poland) B Koniusz	3	4
2	(Sweden) A Siljeström (Slovakia) I Zelenay	6	6

Semifinals
1	(Poland) T Bednarek (Finland) H Kontinen	7	6
(Brazil) R Dutra Silva (Venezuela) R Maytín	5	4
(Moldova) R Albot (Czech Republic) A Pavlásek	7	6
2	(Sweden) A Siljeström (Slovakia) I Zelenay	5	1

Final
1	(Poland) T Bednarek (Finland) H Kontinen	5	6	[8]
(Moldova) R Albot (Czech Republic) A Pavlásek	7	2	[10]
