= 2015 Poznań Open =

- Date: 11 – 19 July
- Edition: 12th
- Draw: 32S/32Q/16D
- Prize money: €64,000+H
- Surface: Clay
- Location: Poznań, Poland
- Venue: Park Tenisowy Olimpia

Champions

Singles
- (Spain) Pablo Carreño Busta

Doubles
- (Russia) Michail Elgin / (Poland) Mateusz Kowalczyk
← 2014 ·	Poznań Open	· 2016 →

The 2015 Poznań Open was a professional tennis tournament played on clay courts. It was the twelfth edition of the tournament which was part of the 2015 ATP Challenger Tour. It took place at the Park Tenisowy Olimpia in Poznań, Poland from 11 to 19 July 2015, including the qualifying competition in the first two days. The tournament had its prize money increased to €64,000 + Hospitality, and thus offered 100 ATP ranking points for singles and doubles winners.

== Singles main-draw entrants ==
=== Seeds ===
Country	Player	Rank (Note: Ranking and seeding as of June 29, 2015)	Seed
ESP	Pablo Carreño Busta	67	1
BRA	João Souza	81	2
FRA	Lucas Pouille	96	3
MDA	Radu Albot	108	4
ESP	Daniel Muñoz de la Nava	109	5
GER	Matthias Bachinger	110	6
JPN	Taro Daniel	125	7
ESP	Albert Montañés	126	8

=== Other entrants ===
The following players received wildcards into the singles main draw:

- (Romania) Victor Vlad Cornea (Note: As part of the cooperation with BRD Sibiu Challenger)
- (Poland) Andriej Kapaś
- (Poland) Hubert Hurkacz
- (Poland) Michał Dembek

The following players received entry as a special exempt:

- (Spain) Pere Riba

The following players received entry from the qualifying draw:

- (Belarus) Maxim Dubarenco
- (Brazil) Rogério Dutra Silva
- (France) Axel Michon
- (Ukraine) Artem Smirnov

The following player received entry as an lucky loser into the singles main draw:

- (Czech Republic) Michal Konečný

=== Withdrawals ===
Before the tournament

- (Portugal) Pedro Sousa →replaced by (Croatia) Franko Škugor
- (Germany) Alexander Zverev →replaced by (Poland) Grzegorz Panfil
- (Russia) Aslan Karatsev →replaced by (Czech Republic) Jan Šátral

During the tournament

- (France) Paul-Henri Mathieu (Note: Withdrawal occurred after the draw was made, Mathieu was replaced by a Lucky Loser)

== Doubles main-draw entrants ==
=== Seeds ===
Country	Player	Country	Player	Rank	Seed
RUS	Michail Elgin	POL	Mateusz Kowalczyk	214	1
ARG	Guillermo Durán	PER	Sergio Galdós	229	2
POL	Tomasz Bednarek	GER	Alexander Satschko	298	3
CHI	Julio Peralta	USA	Matt Seeberger	387	4

=== Other entrants ===
The following pairs received wildcards into the doubles main draw:

- (Romania) Victor Vlad Cornea / (Poland) Karol Drzewiecki
- (Poland) Michał Dembek / (Germany) Viktor Kostin
- (Poland) Hubert Hurkacz / (Poland) Jan Zieliński

The following pair received entry from the qualifying draw:

- (Czech Republic) Michal Konečný / (Czech Republic) Petr Michnev

== Champions ==
=== Singles ===
- (Spain) Pablo Carreño Busta def. (Moldova) Radu Albot, 6–4, 6–4

=== Doubles ===
- (Russia) Michail Elgin / (Poland) Mateusz Kowalczyk def. (Chile) Julio Peralta / (United States) Matt Seeberger, 3–6, 6–3, [10–6]
