= 2015 Poznań Open – Singles =

Singles
- 2015 Poznań Open

Final
- Champion: (Spain) Pablo Carreño Busta
- Runner-up: (Moldova) Radu Albot
- Score: 6–4, 6–4

Events
Singles	Doubles
← 2014 ·	Poznań Open	· 2016 →

David Goffin was the defending champion, but he participated in Davis Cup instead this year.

Pablo Carreño Busta won the title, defeating Radu Albot in the final, 6–4, 6–4.

== Seeds ==
1. (Spain) Pablo Carreño Busta (champion)
2. (Brazil) João Souza (first round)
3. (France) Lucas Pouille (semifinals)
4. (Moldova) Radu Albot (final)
5. (Spain) Daniel Muñoz de la Nava (first round)
6. (Germany) Matthias Bachinger (second round)
7. (Japan) Taro Daniel (second round)
8. (Spain) Albert Montañés (first round)

== Draw ==
=== Key ===
- Q = Qualifier
- WC = Wild card
- LL = Lucky loser
- Alt = Alternate
- SE = Special exempt
- PR = Protected ranking
- ITF = ITF entry
- JE = Junior exempt
- w/o = Walkover
- r = Retired
- d = Defaulted
- SR = Special ranking

=== Finals ===
Semifinals
1	(Spain) Pablo Carreño Busta	6	7^{7}
3	(France) Lucas Pouille	2	6^{4}
4	(Moldova) Radu Albot	6	1	6
(Czech Republic) Adam Pavlásek	0	6	3

Final
1	(Spain) Pablo Carreño Busta	6	6
4	(Moldova) Radu Albot	4	4

=== Top half ===
First round
1	(Spain) P Carreño Busta	6	6
(Poland) G Panfil	4	1
Q	(Ukraine) A Smirnov	4	6	2
(France) M Bourgue	6	3	6
(Czech Republic) J Šátral	6	6
LL	(Czech Republic) Michal Konečný	4	4
Q	(France) A Michon	6	6
8	(Spain) A Montañés	2	0
3	(France) L Pouille	6	7
(Germany) T Kamke	0	5
(Croatia) F Škugor	6	7^{7}
(Russia) A Kudryavtsev	3	6^{0}
(Brazil) A Ghem	6	6
WC	(Poland) H Hurkacz	2	1
WC	(Poland) A Kapaś	1	2
7	(Japan) T Daniel	6	6

Second round
1	(Spain) P Carreño Busta	6	6^{4}	6
(France) M Bourgue	2	7^{7}	1
(Czech Republic) J Šátral	7^{7}	6
Q	(France) A Michon	6^{5}	2
3	(France) L Pouille	6	3	6
(Croatia) F Škugor	3	6	4
(Brazil) A Ghem	2	6	6
7	(Japan) T Daniel	6	2	4

Quarterfinals
1	(Spain) P Carreño Busta	7	6
(Czech Republic) J Šátral	5	4
3	(France) L Pouille	6	6
(Brazil) A Ghem	4	3

Semifinals
1	(Spain) P Carreño Busta	6	7^{7}
3	(France) L Pouille	2	6^{4}

=== Bottom half ===
First round
5	(Spain) D Muñoz de la Nava	3	6	3
(Serbia) P Krstin	6	1	6
WC	(Poland) Michał Dembek	7	0	3
(Australia) J Kubler	5	6	6
Q	(Belarus) M Dubarenco	5	6	6
WC	(Romania) VV Cornea	7	2	3
(Spain) Í Cervantes	2	6	3
4	(Moldova) R Albot	6	4	6
6	(Germany) M Bachinger	6	0	6
Q	(Brazil) R Dutra Silva	4	6	4
(Slovakia) I Klec	2	2
PR	(Spain) P Riba	6	6
(France) T Lamasine	6^{4}	3
(Czech Republic) A Pavlásek	7^{7}	6
(Sweden) E Ymer	7^{7}	6
2	(Brazil) J Souza	6^{4}	4

Second round
(Serbia) P Krstin	7^{7}	2	7
(Australia) J Kubler	6^{5}	6	5
Q	(Belarus) M Dubarenco	3	4
4	(Moldova) R Albot	6	6
6	(Germany) M Bachinger	2	7^{8}	4
PR	(Spain) P Riba	6	6^{6}	6
(Czech Republic) A Pavlásek	7	6
(Sweden) E Ymer	5	4

Quarterfinals
(Serbia) P Krstin	6	6^{10}	6^{2}
4	(Moldova) R Albot	3	7^{12}	7^{7}
PR	(Spain) P Riba	6	4	2
(Czech Republic) A Pavlásek	2	6	6

Semifinals
4	(Moldova) R Albot	6	1	6
(Czech Republic) A Pavlásek	0	6	3
