= 2017 Open BNP Paribas Banque de Bretagne =

- Date: 30 January – 5 February
- Edition: 7th
- Draw: 32S / 16D
- Prize money: €42,500+H
- Surface: Hard
- Location: Quimper, France

Champions

Singles
- (France) Adrian Mannarino

Doubles
- (Russia) Mikhail Elgin / (Slovakia) Igor Zelenay
← 2016 ·	Open BNP Paribas Banque de Bretagne	· 2018 →

The 2017 Open BNP Paribas Banque de Bretagne was a professional tennis tournament played on hard courts. It was the seventh edition of the tournament which was part of the 2017 ATP Challenger Tour. It took place in Quimper, France between 30 January and 5 February 2017.

== Singles main-draw entrants ==
=== Seeds ===
Country	Player	Rank^{1}	Seed
FRA	Adrian Mannarino	61	1
~~FRA~~	~~Jérémy Chardy~~	~~72~~	~~2~~
UKR	Sergiy Stakhovsky	111	3
RUS	Evgeny Donskoy	125	4
FRA	Julien Benneteau	137	5
FRA	Vincent Millot	140	6
RUS	Andrey Rublev	152	7
GER	Peter Gojowczyk	153	8

- ^{1} Rankings as of January 16, 2017.

=== Other entrants ===
The following players received wildcards into the singles main draw:

- (France) Geoffrey Blancaneaux
- (France) Evan Furness
- (France) Maxime Hamou
- (Poland) Jerzy Janowicz

The following player received entry into the singles main draw using a protected ranking:

- (Austria) Jürgen Melzer

The following players received entry from the qualifying draw:

- (France) Calvin Hemery
- (Russia) Aslan Karatsev
- (France) Hugo Nys
- (France) Gleb Sakharov

The following player received entry as a lucky loser:

- (France) Grégoire Jacq

== Champions ==
=== Singles ===
- (France) Adrian Mannarino def. (Germany) Peter Gojowczyk 6–4, 6–4.

=== Doubles ===
- (Russia) Mikhail Elgin / (Slovakia) Igor Zelenay def. (United Kingdom) Ken Skupski / (United Kingdom) Neal Skupski 2–6, 7–5, [10–5].
