= 2019 Poznań Open – Singles =

Singles
- 2019 Poznań Open

Final
- Champion: (Spain) Tommy Robredo
- Runner-up: (Germany) Rudolf Molleker
- Score: 5–7, 6–4, 6–1

Events
| Singles | Doubles |
- Poznań Open

Hubert Hurkacz was the defending champion but lost in the semifinals to Rudolf Molleker.

At 37 years and 1 month, Tommy Robredo won the title after defeating Molleker 5–7, 6–4, 6–1 in the final, making him the oldest winner for 2019 and sixth-oldest in the history of the ATP Challenger Tour.

== Seeds ==
All seeds receive a bye into the second round.

1. (Poland) Hubert Hurkacz (semifinals)
2. (Spain) Roberto Carballés Baena (second round, retired)
3. (Austria) Dennis Novak (third round)
4. (Sweden) Elias Ymer (second round)
5. (Portugal) Pedro Sousa (quarterfinals)
6. (Spain) Pedro Martínez (second round)
7. (Austria) Sebastian Ofner (third round)
8. (Italy) Gianluca Mager (quarterfinals)
9. (Germany) Oscar Otte (third round)
10. (France) Quentin Halys (quarterfinals)
11. (Portugal) João Domingues (third round)
12. (Italy) Filippo Baldi (third round)
13. (Italy) Alessandro Giannessi (quarterfinals)
14. (Spain) Enrique López Pérez (third round)
15. (Germany) Rudolf Molleker (final)
16. (Slovenia) Blaž Rola (second round)

== Draw ==
Key

- Q = Qualifier
- WC = Wild card
- LL = Lucky loser
- Alt = Alternate
- ITF = ITF entry
- PR = Protected ranking
- SR = Special ranking
- SE = Special exempt
- JE = Junior exempt
- JR = Junior Accelerator Programme entrant
- CO = College Accelerator Programme entrant
- NG = Next Gen Accelerator Program entrant
- w/o = Walkover
- r = Retired
- d = Defaulted

=== Finals ===
Quarterfinals
1/WC | (Poland) Hubert Hurkacz | 6 | 6
5 | (Portugal) Pedro Sousa | 1 | 4
15 | (Germany) Rudolf Molleker | 6 | 2 | 6
10 | (France) Quentin Halys | 4 | 6 | 4
8 | (Italy) Gianluca Mager | 7 | 5 | 3
(Spain) Tommy Robredo | 5 | 7 | 6
Q | (Italy) Andrea Vavassori | 7^{7} | 6
13 | (Italy) Alessandro Giannessi | 6^{5} | 1

Semifinals
1/WC | (Poland) Hubert Hurkacz | 4 | 4
15 | (Germany) Rudolf Molleker | 6 | 6
(Spain) Tommy Robredo | 6 | 6
Q | (Italy) Andrea Vavassori | 2 | 1

Final
15 | (Germany) Rudolf Molleker | 7 | 4 | 1
(Spain) Tommy Robredo | 5 | 6 | 6

=== Top half ===
==== Section 1 ====
First round
PR | (Germany) D Altmaier | 6 | 6
(Russia) T Gabashvili | 0 | 4
(Netherlands) T Griekspoor | 4 | 6 | 6
WC | (Poland) D Michalski | 6 | 3 | 2
WC | (Poland) W Marek | 4 | 1
ITF | (United States) S Bangoura | 6 | 6
(Spain) Carlos Boluda-Purkiss | 1 | 3
(Russia) A Vatutin | 6 | 6

Second round
1/WC | (Poland) H Hurkacz | 7^{7} | 6
PR | (Germany) D Altmaier | 6^{5} | 0
(Netherlands) T Griekspoor | 6^{4} | 3
14 | (Spain) E López Pérez | 7^{7} | 6
11 | (Portugal) J Domingues | 6 | 6
ITF | (United States) S Bangoura | 4 | 1
(Russia) A Vatutin | 2 | 6 | 4
5 | (Portugal) P Sousa | 6 | 2 | 6

Third round
1/WC | (Poland) H Hurkacz | 6 | 6
14 | (Spain) E López Pérez | 4 | 3
11 | (Portugal) J Domingues | 3 | 6 | 3
5 | (Portugal) P Sousa | 6 | 3 | 6

Quarterfinals
1/WC | (Poland) H Hurkacz | 6 | 6
5 | (Portugal) P Sousa | 1 | 4

==== Section 2 ====
First round
(Australia) Jacob Grills | 1 | 3
(Czech Republic) Z Kolář | 6 | 6
(China) Ze Zhang | 4 | 6 | 6^{2}
(Norway) V Durasovic | 6 | 2 | 7^{7}
(Argentina) F Argüello | 7^{7} | 6^{5} | 6^{5}
(Slovakia) N Gombos | 6^{0} | 7^{7} | 7^{7}
ITF | (Italy) Pietro Rondoni | 6^{3} | 4
(Italy) A Arnaboldi | 7^{7} | 6

Second round
4 | (Sweden) E Ymer | 6 | 4 | 1
(Czech Republic) Z Kolář | 3 | 6 | 6
(Norway) V Durasovic | 4 | 3
15 | (Germany) R Molleker | 6 | 6
10 | (France) Q Halys | 6 | 6
(Slovakia) N Gombos | 3 | 4
(Italy) A Arnaboldi | 3 | 7^{8} | 2
7 | (Austria) S Ofner | 6 | 6^{6} | 6

Third round
(Czech Republic) Z Kolář | 6 | 1 | 4
15 | (Germany) R Molleker | 4 | 6 | 6
10 | (France) Q Halys | 6 | 2 | 6
7 | (Austria) S Ofner | 4 | 6 | 3

Quarterfinals
15 | (Germany) R Molleker | 6 | 2 | 6
10 | (France) Q Halys | 4 | 6 | 4

=== Bottom half ===
==== Section 3 ====
First round
(Germany) M Moraing | 3 | 5
ITF | (Belgium) Christopher Heyman | 6 | 7
ITF | (Italy) R Brancaccio | 5 | 6^{5}
(Dominican Republic) J Hernández-Fernández | 7 | 7^{7}
Q | (Italy) J Berrettini | 2 | 7^{7} | 1
(Spain) T Robredo | 6 | 6^{5} | 6
(Spain) R Ortega Olmedo | 6 | 6^{5} | 6
ITF | (Spain) J Barranco Cosano | 3 | 7^{7} | 4

Second round
8 | (Italy) G Mager | 7^{7} | 6
ITF | (Belgium) C Heyman | 6^{3} | 4
(Dominican Republic) J Hernández-Fernández | 6 | 6^{2} | 0
12 | (Italy) F Baldi | 3 | 7^{7} | 6
16 | (Slovenia) B Rola | 4 | 6^{3}
(Spain) T Robredo | 6 | 7^{7}
(Spain) R Ortega Olmedo | 0 | 4
3 | (Austria) D Novak | 6 | 6

Third round
8 | (Italy) G Mager | 6 | 6
12 | (Italy) F Baldi | 1 | 1
(Spain) T Robredo | 6 | 5 | 6
3 | (Austria) D Novak | 3 | 7 | 2

Quarterfinals
8 | (Italy) G Mager | 7 | 5 | 3
(Spain) T Robredo | 5 | 7 | 6

==== Section 4 ====
First round
(Peru) JP Varillas | 3 | 7 | 4
Q | (Italy) A Vavassori | 6 | 5 | 6
(Italy) A Bega | 6 | 6
WC | (Poland) Michał Dembek | 3 | 3
(France) C Lestienne | 3 | 7 | 3
(India) S Nagal | 6 | 5 | 6
(Germany) D Masur | 6 | 7^{7}
WC | (Poland) K Żuk | 4 | 6^{2}

Second round
6 | (Spain) P Martínez | 4 | 4
Q | (Italy) A Vavassori | 6 | 6
(Italy) A Bega | 6 | 6^{3} | 3
9 | (Germany) O Otte | 1 | 7^{7} | 6
13 | (Italy) A Giannessi | 7 | 3 | 6
(India) S Nagal | 5 | 6 | 3
(Germany) D Masur | 5
2 | (Spain) R Carballés Baena | 0^{r}

Third round
Q | (Italy) A Vavassori | 7^{7} | 6
9 | (Germany) O Otte | 6^{3} | 2
13 | (Italy) A Giannessi | 7^{7} | 4 | 6
(Germany) D Masur | 6^{4} | 6 | 3

Quarterfinals
Q | (Italy) A Vavassori | 7^{7} | 6
13 | (Italy) A Giannessi | 6^{5} | 1
