= 2018 Open BNP Paribas Banque de Bretagne – Singles =

Singles
- 2018 Open BNP Paribas Banque de Bretagne

Final
- Champion: (France) Quentin Halys
- Runner-up: (Russia) Alexey Vatutin
- Score: 6–3, 7–6^{(7–1)}

Events
Singles	Doubles
← 2017 ·	Open BNP Paribas Banque de Bretagne	· 2019 →

Adrian Mannarino was the defending champion but chose not to defend his title.

Quentin Halys won the title after defeating Alexey Vatutin 6–3, 7–6^{(7–1)} in the final.

== Seeds ==
1. (Greece) Stefanos Tsitsipas (semifinals)
2. (Russia) Mikhail Youzhny (withdrew)
3. (Bosnia and Herzegovina) Mirza Bašić (second round)
4. (Germany) Dustin Brown (second round)
5. (France) Quentin Halys (champion)
6. (Slovakia) Martin Kližan (second round)
7. (Belarus) Uladzimir Ignatik (second round)
8. (Germany) Yannick Maden (second round)

== Draw ==
=== Key ===
- Q = Qualifier
- WC = Wild card
- LL = Lucky loser
- Alt = Alternate
- SE = Special exempt
- PR = Protected ranking
- ITF = ITF entry
- JE = Junior exempt
- w/o = Walkover
- r = Retired
- d = Defaulted
- SR = Special ranking

=== Finals ===
Semifinals
1/WC	(Greece) Stefanos Tsitsipas	6	4	6^{4}
5	(France) Quentin Halys	1	6	7^{7}
(Russia) Alexey Vatutin	6	7^{7}
(France) Calvin Hemery	4	6^{5}

Final
5	(France) Quentin Halys	6	7^{7}
(Russia) Alexey Vatutin	3	6^{1}

=== Top half ===
First round
1/WC	(Greece) S Tsitsipas	6	6
(Bosnia and Herzegovina) A Šetkić	3	4
SE	(France) A Hoang	6	6
(Slovakia) J Kovalík	3	4
(Spain) C Taberner	4	1
(Italy) S Napolitano	6	6
WC	(France) E Furness	4	6	3
8	(Germany) Y Maden	6	4	6
4	(Germany) D Brown	6	6
Alt	(United Kingdom) J Clarke	4	4
Q	(France) M Janvier	3	6	6
LL	(Germany) Jeremy Jahn	6	1	4
(Belgium) A De Greef	2	4
(France) V Millot	6	6
(France) M Bourgue	3	4
5	(France) Q Halys	6	6

Second round
1/WC	(Greece) S Tsitsipas	6	5	6
SE	(France) A Hoang	4	7	4
(Italy) S Napolitano	3	7^{10}	6
8	(Germany) Y Maden	6	6^{8}	2
4	(Germany) D Brown	3	7^{7}	2
Q	(France) M Janvier	6	6^{4}	6
(France) V Millot	2	1
5	(France) Q Halys	6	6

Quarterfinals
1/WC	(Greece) S Tsitsipas	4	7^{10}	6
(Italy) S Napolitano	6	6^{8}	4
Q	(France) M Janvier	6^{4}	2
5	(France) Q Halys	7^{7}	6

Semifinals
1/WC	(Greece) S Tsitsipas	6	4	6^{4}
5	(France) Q Halys	1	6	7^{7}

=== Bottom half ===
First round
6	(Slovakia) M Kližan	6^{5}	6	6
Q	(France) D Guez	7^{7}	2	4
Q	(France) G Barrère	5	6	5
LL	(France) T Lamasine	7	4	7
(Russia) A Vatutin	6	6
WC	(France) E Benchetrit	1	1
(Russia) T Gabashvili	6	1	2^{r}
3	(Bosnia and Herzegovina) M Bašić	4	6	5
7	(Belarus) U Ignatik	6	4	6
(France) G Sakharov	3	6	1
(France) C Hemery	6	6
(Italy) A Arnaboldi	4	4
(Spain) R Ojeda Lara	0	6	3
(Spain) J Munar	6	4	6
(Argentina) M Trungelliti	7^{7}	6
Q	(Italy) M Donati	6^{4}	1

Second round
6	(Slovakia) M Kližan	6	4	6^{5}
LL	(France) T Lamasine	3	6	7^{7}
(Russia) A Vatutin	6	3	7^{8}
3	(Bosnia and Herzegovina) M Bašić	3	6	6^{6}
7	(Belarus) U Ignatik	4	4
(France) C Hemery	6	6
(Spain) J Munar	6^{6}	7^{7}	6
(Argentina) M Trungelliti	7^{8}	6^{5}	3

Quarterfinals
LL	(France) T Lamasine	2	2
(Russia) A Vatutin	6	6
(France) C Hemery	6	6
(Spain) J Munar	4	0

Semifinals
(Russia) A Vatutin	6	7^{7}
(France) C Hemery	4	6^{5}
