= 2014 Poznań Open – Singles =

Singles
- 2014 Poznań Open

Final
- Champion: (Belgium) David Goffin
- Runner-up: (Slovenia) Blaž Rola
- Score: 6–4, 6–2

Events
Singles	Doubles
← 2013 ·	Poznań Open	· 2015 →

Andreas Haider-Maurer was the defending champion, but lost in the quarterfinals to Adam Pavlásek.
David Goffin won the title, beating Blaž Rola in the final, 6–4, 6–2.

== Seeds ==
1. (Slovenia) Blaž Rola (final)
2. (Austria) Andreas Haider-Maurer (quarterfinals)
3. (Belgium) David Goffin (champion)
4. (Brazil) João Souza (semifinals)
5. (Bosnia and Herzegovina) Damir Džumhur (first round)
6. (Germany) Andreas Beck (first round)
7. (France) Pierre-Hugues Herbert (first round)
8. (Romania) Adrian Ungur (quarterfinals)

== Draw ==
=== Key ===
- Q = Qualifier
- WC = Wild card
- LL = Lucky loser
- Alt = Alternate
- SE = Special exempt
- PR = Protected ranking
- ITF = ITF entry
- JE = Junior exempt
- w/o = Walkover
- r = Retired
- d = Defaulted
- SR = Special ranking

=== Finals ===
Semifinals
1	(Slovenia) Blaž Rola	3	7^{7}	6
4	(Brazil) João Souza	6	6^{2}	3
3	(Belgium) David Goffin	6	6
(Czech Republic) Adam Pavlásek	4	0

Final
1	(Slovenia) Blaž Rola	4	2
3	(Belgium) David Goffin	6	6

=== Top half ===
First round
1	(Slovenia) B Rola	6	6
(Chile) H Podlipnik Castillo	2	1
PR	(Ecuador) G Lapentti	1	3
Q	(Ukraine) A Smirnov	6	6
(Moldova) R Albot	6	2	3
(Portugal) R Machado	4	6	6
WC	(Poland) A Kapaś	6	7^{7}
6	(Germany) A Beck	3	6^{5}
4	(Brazil) J Souza	6	6
(Germany) M Bachinger	2	4
Q	(Netherlands) W Koolhof	7^{7}	4	4
PR	(Spain) I Cervantes	6^{4}	6	6
Q	(Serbia) M Zekić	6^{7}	7^{8}	7
WC	(Poland) B Koniusz	7^{9}	6^{6}	5
(Belgium) K Coppejans	3	1
8	(Romania) A Ungur	6	6

Second round
1	(Slovenia) B Rola	6	6
Q	(Ukraine) A Smirnov	3	2
(Portugal) R Machado	6	6
WC	(Poland) A Kapaś	4	2
4	(Brazil) J Souza	7^{8}	6
PR	(Spain) I Cervantes	6^{6}	3
Q	(Serbia) M Zekić	2	6^{9}
8	(Romania) A Ungur	6	7^{11}

Quarterfinals
1	(Slovenia) B Rola	1	6	6
(Portugal) R Machado	6	1	2
4	(Brazil) J Souza	7	4	6
8	(Romania) A Ungur	5	6	4

Semifinals
1	(Slovenia) B Rola	3	7^{7}	6
4	(Brazil) J Souza	6	6^{2}	3

=== Bottom half ===
First round
5	(Bosnia and Herzegovina) D Džumhur	4	6^{2}
(Argentina) M Alund	6	7^{7}
(Spain) E López Pérez	6	7
Alt	(Belgium) G Gigounon	4	5
WC	(Poland) G Panfil	7^{7}	6
(Brazil) R Dutra Silva	6^{3}	3
(France) G Burquier	0	4
3	(Belgium) D Goffin	6	6
7	(France) P-H Herbert	6^{3}	5
WC	(Poland) K Majchrzak	7^{7}	7
(Croatia) B Ćorić	6	3	1
(Czech Republic) A Pavlásek	4	6	6
(Japan) T Daniel	6	6
Alt	(Australia) A Bolt	4	2
Q	(Chile) C Garin	4	6^{3}
2	(Austria) A Haider-Maurer	6	7^{7}

Second round
(Argentina) M Alund	6	6
(Spain) E López Pérez	1	2
WC	(Poland) G Panfil	2	2
3	(Belgium) D Goffin	6	6
WC	(Poland) K Majchrzak	6	5	1
(Czech Republic) A Pavlásek	4	7	6
(Japan) T Daniel	3	1
2	(Austria) A Haider-Maurer	6	6

Quarterfinals
(Argentina) M Alund	3	2
3	(Belgium) D Goffin	6	6
(Czech Republic) A Pavlásek	3	7	6
2	(Austria) A Haider-Maurer	6	5	0

Semifinals
3	(Belgium) D Goffin	6	6
(Czech Republic) A Pavlásek	4	0
