= 2013 Poznań Open =

- Date: 13 – 21 July
- Edition: 10th
- Draw: 32S/32Q/16D
- Prize money: €30,000+H
- Surface: Clay
- Location: Poznań, Poland
- Venue: Park Tenisowy Olimpia

Champions

Singles
- (Austria) Andreas Haider-Maurer

Doubles
- (Germany) Gero Kretschmer / (Germany) Alexander Satschko
← 2012 ·	Poznań Open	· 2014 →

The 2013 Poznań Open was a professional tennis tournament played on clay courts. It was the jubilee tenth edition of the tournament which was part of the 2013 ATP Challenger Tour. It took place at the Park Tenisowy Olimpia in Poznań, Poland from 13 to 21 July 2013, including the qualifying competition in the first two days.

== Singles main draw entrants ==
=== Seeds ===
Country	Player	Rank	Seed
AUT	Andreas Haider-Maurer	98	1
FRA	Guillaume Rufin	99	2
POR	João Sousa	102	3
ESP	Pablo Carreño Busta	125	4
FRA	Stéphane Robert	145	5
NED	Jesse Huta Galung	159	6
GER	Simon Greul	160	7
GER	Peter Gojowczyk	168	8

=== Other entrants ===
The following players received wildcards into the singles main draw:

- (Poland) Piotr Gadomski
- (Poland) Wojciech Lutkowski
- (Poland) Kamil Majchrzak
- (Poland) Grzegorz Panfil

The following player received entry using a protected ranking:

- (Germany) Andreas Beck

The following players received entry from the qualifying draw:

- (Poland) Andriej Kapaś
- (Serbia) Filip Krajinović
- (Brazil) Thiago Monteiro
- (United Kingdom) Daniel Smethurst

=== Withdrawals ===
Before the tournament

- (Argentina) Facundo Bagnis
- (France) Jonathan Dasnières de Veigy
- (Brazil) Rogério Dutra da Silva
- (Brazil) André Ghem
- (Spain) Javier Martí

== Doubles main draw entrants ==
=== Seeds ===
Country	Player	Country	Player	Rank	Seed
AUS	Colin Ebelthite	GER	Philipp Marx	208	1
SWE	Andreas Siljeström	SVK	Igor Zelenay	212	2
CRO	Franko Škugor	SRB	Goran Tošić	278	3
FRA	Jonathan Eysseric	FRA	Nicolas Renavand	327	4

=== Other entrants ===
The following pairs received wildcards into the doubles main draw:

- (Poland) Adam Chadaj / (Poland) Piotr Gadomski
- (Poland) Bogdan Dzudzewicz / (Poland) Mikołaj Jędruszczak
- (Poland) Maciej Lorenz / (Poland) Bartosz Sawicki

== Champions ==
=== Singles ===
(Austria) Andreas Haider-Maurer def. (Bosnia and Herzegovina) Damir Džumhur, 4–6, 6–1, 7–5

=== Doubles ===
(Germany) Gero Kretschmer / (Germany) Alexander Satschko def. (Finland) Henri Kontinen / (Poland) Mateusz Kowalczyk, 6–3, 6–3
