= 2019 Open BNP Paribas Banque de Bretagne =

- Date: 28 January – 3 February
- Edition: 9th
- Surface: Hard
- Location: Quimper, France

Champions

Singles
- (France) Grégoire Barrère

Doubles
- (France) Fabrice Martin / (France) Hugo Nys
← 2018 ·	Open BNP Paribas Banque de Bretagne	· 2020 →

The 2019 Open BNP Paribas Banque de Bretagne was a professional tennis tournament played on hard courts. It was the ninth edition of the tournament which was part of the 2019 ATP Challenger Tour. It took place in Quimper, France between 28 January and 3 February 2019.

== Singles main-draw entrants ==
=== Seeds ===
Country	Player	Rank^{1}	Seed
POL	Hubert Hurkacz	76	1
FRA	Ugo Humbert	95	2
ESP	Marcel Granollers	108	3
LTU	Ričardas Berankis	110	4
FRA	Quentin Halys	127	5
GER	Matthias Bachinger	128	6
ESP	Adrián Menéndez Maceiras	129	7
UKR	Sergiy Stakhovsky	132	8
FRA	Constant Lestienne	142	9
EST	Jürgen Zopp	146	10
~~FRA~~	~~Antoine Hoang~~	~~147~~	~~11~~
ITA	Salvatore Caruso	156	12
GER	Mats Moraing	157	13
BLR	Egor Gerasimov	158	14
FRA	Grégoire Barrère	159	15
ITA	Filippo Baldi	167	16

- ^{1} Rankings as of 14 January 2019.

=== Other entrants ===
The following players received wildcards into the singles main draw:

- (France) Constantin Bittoun Kouzmine
- (France) Antoine Cornut-Chauvinc
- (Belgium) Steve Darcis
- (France) Evan Furness
- (France) Hugo Gaston

The following players received entry into the singles main draw using their ITF World Tennis Ranking:

- (Spain) Javier Barranco Cosano
- (Italy) Raúl Brancaccio
- (Russia) Aslan Karatsev
- (Russia) Roman Safiullin

The following players received entry into the singles main draw as alternates:

- (France) Hugo Nys
- (Italy) Fabrizio Ornago

The following players received entry from the qualifying draw:

- (France) Manuel Guinard
- (France) Grégoire Jacq

The following player received entry as a lucky loser:

- (France) Quentin Gueydan

== Champions ==
=== Singles ===
- (France) Grégoire Barrère def. (United Kingdom) Dan Evans 4–6, 6–2, 6–3.

=== Doubles ===
- (France) Fabrice Martin / (France) Hugo Nys def. (Netherlands) David Pel / (Croatia) Antonio Šančić 6–4, 6–2.
