= 2013 Poznań Open – Doubles =

Doubles
- 2013 Poznań Open

Final
- Champions: (Germany) Gero Kretschmer (Germany) Alexander Satschko
- Runners-up: (Finland) Henri Kontinen (Poland) Mateusz Kowalczyk
- Score: 6–3, 6–3

Events
Singles	Doubles
← 2012 ·	Poznań Open	· 2014 →

Rameez Junaid and Simon Stadler were the defending champions, but they did not participate that year.
Gero Kretschmer and Alexander Satschko won the title, defeating Henri Kontinen and Mateusz Kowalczyk in the final, 6–3, 6–3.

== Seeds ==
1. (Australia) Colin Ebelthite / (Germany) Philipp Marx (first round)
2. (Sweden) Andreas Siljeström / (Slovakia) Igor Zelenay (semifinals)
3. (Croatia) Franko Škugor / (Serbia) Goran Tošić (semifinals)
4. (France) Jonathan Eysseric / (France) Nicolas Renavand (quarterfinals)

== Draw ==
=== Key ===
- Q = Qualifier
- WC = Wild card
- LL = Lucky loser
- Alt = Alternate
- SE = Special exempt
- PR = Protected ranking
- ITF = ITF entry
- JE = Junior exempt
- w/o = Walkover
- r = Retired
- d = Defaulted
- SR = Special ranking

=== Draw ===
First round
1	(Australia) C Ebelthite (Germany) P Marx	6	4	[6]
(Finland) H Kontinen (Poland) M Kowalczyk	3	6	[10]
WC	(Poland) Bogdan Dzudzewicz (Poland) Mikołaj Jędruszczak	4	2
(Brazil) G Clezar (Brazil) L Kirche	6	6
3	(Croatia) F Škugor (Serbia) G Tošić	6	6
(Bosnia and Herzegovina) D Džumhur (Serbia) F Krajinović	1	1
(Poland) A Kapaś (Poland) G Panfil	2	2
(Czech Republic) J Mertl (Czech Republic) Libor Salaba	6	6
(Germany) G Kretschmer (Germany) A Satschko	6	6
WC	(Poland) Maciej Lorenz (Poland) Bartosz Sawicki	1	2
(Spain) R Carballés Baena (Spain) P Carreño Busta	3	6	[10]
4	(France) J Eysseric (France) N Renavand	6	3	[12]
(Australia) Chris Letcher (New Zealand) A Sitak	6	6
WC	(Poland) A Chadaj (Poland) Piotr Gadomski	4	3
(Austria) A Haider-Maurer (Austria) G Melzer	1	2
2	(Sweden) A Siljeström (Slovakia) I Zelenay	6	6

Quarterfinals
(Finland) H Kontinen (Poland) M Kowalczyk	w/o
(Brazil) G Clezar (Brazil) L Kirche
3	(Croatia) F Škugor (Serbia) G Tošić	6	7
(Czech Republic) J Mertl (Czech Republic) L Salaba	2	5
(Germany) G Kretschmer (Germany) A Satschko	6	4	[10]
4	(France) J Eysseric (France) N Renavand	2	6	[5]
(Australia) C Letcher (New Zealand) A Sitak	6	3	[8]
2	(Sweden) A Siljeström (Slovakia) I Zelenay	3	6	[10]

Semifinals
(Finland) H Kontinen (Poland) M Kowalczyk	7^{7}	7^{7}
3	(Croatia) F Škugor (Serbia) G Tošić	6^{4}	6^{5}
(Germany) G Kretschmer (Germany) A Satschko	4	7^{7}	[10]
2	(Sweden) A Siljeström (Slovakia) I Zelenay	6	6^{3}	[7]

Final
(Finland) H Kontinen (Poland) M Kowalczyk	3	3
(Germany) G Kretschmer (Germany) A Satschko	6	6
