= 2018 Open BNP Paribas Banque de Bretagne =

- Date: 29 January – 4 February
- Edition: 8th
- Draw: 32S / 16D
- Surface: Hard
- Location: Quimper, France

Champions

Singles
- (France) Quentin Halys

Doubles
- (United Kingdom) Ken Skupski / (United Kingdom) Neal Skupski
← 2017 ·	Open BNP Paribas Banque de Bretagne	· 2019 →

The 2018 Open BNP Paribas Banque de Bretagne was a professional tennis tournament played on hard courts. It was the eighth edition of the tournament which was part of the 2018 ATP Challenger Tour. It took place in Quimper, France between 29 January and 4 February 2018.

== Singles main-draw entrants ==
=== Seeds ===
Country	Player	Rank^{1}	Seed
GRE	Stefanos Tsitsipas	82	1
~~RUS~~	~~Mikhail Youzhny~~	~~90~~	~~2~~
BIH	Mirza Bašić	128	3
GER	Dustin Brown	129	4
FRA	Quentin Halys	134	5
SVK	Martin Kližan	145	6
BLR	Uladzimir Ignatik	146	7
GER	Yannick Maden	149	8

- ^{1} Rankings as of January 15, 2018.

=== Other entrants ===
The following players received wildcards into the singles main draw:

- (France) Elliot Benchetrit
- (France) Evan Furness
- (Greece) Stefanos Tsitsipas

The following player received entry into the singles main draw as a special exempt:

- (France) Antoine Hoang

The following player received entry into the singles main draw as an alternate:

- (United Kingdom) Jay Clarke

The following players received entry from the qualifying draw:

- (France) Grégoire Barrère
- (Italy) Matteo Donati
- (France) David Guez
- (France) Maxime Janvier

The following players received entry as lucky losers:

- (Germany) Jeremy Jahn
- (France) Tristan Lamasine

== Champions ==
=== Singles ===
- (France) Quentin Halys def. (Russia) Alexey Vatutin 6–3, 7–6^{(7–1)}.

=== Doubles ===
- (United Kingdom) Ken Skupski / (United Kingdom) Neal Skupski def. (Belgium) Sander Gillé / (Belgium) Joran Vliegen 6–3, 3–6, [10–7].
