= 2016 Open BNP Paribas Banque de Bretagne – Doubles =

Doubles
- 2016 Open BNP Paribas Banque de Bretagne

Final
- Champions: (France) Tristan Lamasine (France) Albano Olivetti
- Runners-up: (Croatia) Nikola Mektić (Croatia) Antonio Šančić
- Score: 6–2 , 4–6 , [10–7]

Events
Singles	Doubles
- Open BNP Paribas Banque de Bretagne

Flavio Cipolla and Dominik Meffert were the defending champions, but chose not to participate.

Tristan Lamasine and Albano Olivetti won the title, defeating Nikola Mektić and Antonio Šančić 6–2, 4–6, [10–7] in the final.

== Seeds ==
1. (Australia) Rameez Junaid / (United Kingdom) Jonathan Marray (first round)
2. (United Kingdom) Ken Skupski / (United Kingdom) Neal Skupski (first round)
3. (Croatia) Nikola Mektić / (Croatia) Antonio Šančić (final)
4. (Germany) Frank Moser / (Germany) Jan-Lennard Struff (quarterfinals)

== Draw ==
Key

- Q = Qualifier
- WC = Wild card
- LL = Lucky loser
- Alt = Alternate
- ITF = ITF entry
- PR = Protected ranking
- SR = Special ranking
- SE = Special exempt
- JE = Junior exempt
- JR = Junior Accelerator Programme entrant
- CO = College Accelerator Programme entrant
- NG = Next Gen Accelerator Program entrant
- w/o = Walkover
- r = Retired
- d = Defaulted

First round
1	(Australia) R Junaid (United Kingdom) J Marray	4	3
(Belarus) U Ignatik (Slovakia) L Lacko	6	6
(France) A Sidorenko (United Kingdom) D Walsh	6	2	[11]
(France) G Barrère (France) Q Halys	1	6	[9]
3	(Croatia) N Mektić (Croatia) A Šančić	6	6
WC	(France) C Hemery (France) C Lestienne	4	4
(United States) J Cerretani (Austria) T-S Weissborn	6	6
(Netherlands) S Arends (Poland) A Majchrowicz	3	2
WC	(France) T Lamasine (France) A Olivetti	6	4	[10]
(Czech Republic) A Pavlásek (Bosnia and Herzegovina) A Šetkić	3	6	[8]
(Russia) K Khachanov (Russia) A Rublev	3	6	[7]
4	(Germany) F Moser (Germany) J-L Struff	6	1	[10]
(Italy) A Arnaboldi (Uzbekistan) F Dustov	5	0
(France) D Guez (France) M Teixeira	7	6
WC	(Slovakia) M Mertiňák (Ukraine) S Stakhovsky	6	1	[12]
2	(United Kingdom) K Skupski (United Kingdom) N Skupski	4	6	[10]

Quarterfinals
(Belarus) U Ignatik (Slovakia) L Lacko	7^{7}	6
(France) A Sidorenko (United Kingdom) D Walsh	6^{5}	3
3	(Croatia) N Mektić (Croatia) A Šančić	6	6
(United States) J Cerretani (Austria) T-S Weissborn	3	3
WC	(France) T Lamasine (France) A Olivetti	6	6
4	(Germany) F Moser (Germany) J-L Struff	1	4
(France) D Guez (France) M Teixeira	6	1	[11]
WC	(Slovakia) M Mertiňák (Ukraine) S Stakhovsky	2	6	[9]

Semifinals
(Belarus) U Ignatik (Slovakia) L Lacko	3	2
3	(Croatia) N Mektić (Croatia) A Šančić	6	6
WC	(France) T Lamasine (France) A Olivetti	6	3	[12]
(France) D Guez (France) M Teixeira	3	6	[10]

Final
3	(Croatia) N Mektić (Croatia) A Šančić	2	6	[7]
WC	(France) T Lamasine (France) A Olivetti	6	4	[10]
