= 2016 Open BNP Paribas Banque de Bretagne =

- Date: 29 February – 6 March
- Edition: 6th
- Draw: 32S / 16D
- Prize money: €42,500+H
- Surface: Hard
- Location: Quimper, France

Champions

Singles
- (Russia) Andrey Rublev

Doubles
- (France) Tristan Lamasine / (France) Albano Olivetti
← 2015 ·	Open BNP Paribas Banque de Bretagne	· 2017 →

The 2016 Open BNP Paribas Banque de Bretagne was a professional tennis tournament played on hard courts. It was the sixth edition of the tournament which was part of the 2016 ATP Challenger Tour. It took place in Quimper, France, between 29 February and 6 March 2016.

== Singles main-draw entrants ==
=== Seeds ===
Country	Player	Rank^{1}	Seed
FRA	Paul-Henri Mathieu	69	1
UKR	Sergiy Stakhovsky	92	2
GER	Jan-Lennard Struff	108	3
SVK	Lukáš Lacko	109	4
FRA	~~Pierre-Hugues Herbert~~	~~115~~	5
CZE	Adam Pavlásek	147	6
FRA	Kenny de Schepper	150	7
RUS	Karen Khachanov	152	8

- ^{1} Rankings as of February 22, 2016.

=== Other entrants ===
The following players received wildcards into the singles main draw:

- (France) Grégoire Barrère
- (France) Albano Olivetti
- (France) Maxime Tabatruong
- (France) Maxime Teixeira

The following players received entry from the qualifying draw:

- (France) Romain Jouan
- (Germany) Tobias Kamke
- (Russia) Andrey Rublev
- (France) Alexandre Sidorenko

The following players received entry as a lucky loser:

- (Croatia) Nikola Mektić

=== Retirements ===
- (France) Calvin Hemery (right adductor injury)
- (Netherlands) Igor Sijsling (personal reasons)

=== Withdrawals ===
Before The Tournament

- (France) Pierre-Hugues Herbert (general fatigue)

During The Tournament

- (Ukraine) Sergiy Stakhovsky (low back injury)

== Champions ==
=== Singles ===
- (Russia) Andrey Rublev def. (France) Paul-Henri Mathieu 6–7^{(6–8)}, 6–4, 6–4

=== Doubles ===
- (France) Tristan Lamasine / (France) Albano Olivetti def. (Croatia) Nikola Mektić / (Croatia) Antonio Šančić 6–2, 4–6, [10–7]
