= 2014 Poznań Open =

- Date: 12 – 20 July
- Edition: 11th
- Draw: 32S/32Q/16D
- Prize money: €35,000+H
- Surface: Clay
- Location: Poznań, Poland
- Venue: Park Tenisowy Olimpia

Champions

Singles
- (Belgium) David Goffin

Doubles
- (Moldova) Radu Albot / (Czech Republic) Adam Pavlásek
| ← 2013 · | Poznań Open | · 2015 → |

The 2014 Poznań Open was a professional tennis tournament played on clay courts. It was the eleventh edition of the tournament which was part of the 2014 ATP Challenger Tour. It took place at the Park Tenisowy Olimpia in Poznań, Poland from 12 to 20 July 2014, including the qualifying competition in the first two days.

== Singles main-draw entrants ==
=== Seeds ===
| Country | Player | Rank | Seed |
|---|---|---|---|
| SLO | Blaž Rola | 81 | 1 |
| AUT | Andreas Haider-Maurer | 97 | 2 |
| BEL | David Goffin | 106 | 3 |
| BRA | João Souza | 126 | 4 |
| BIH | Damir Džumhur | 130 | 5 |
| GER | Andreas Beck | 131 | 6 |
| FRA | Pierre-Hugues Herbert | 132 | 7 |
| ROU | Adrian Ungur | 162 | 8 |

=== Other entrants ===
The following players received wildcards into the singles main draw:

- (Poland) Andriej Kapaś
- (Poland) Błażej Koniusz
- (Poland) Kamil Majchrzak
- (Poland) Grzegorz Panfil

The following players received entry as an alternate into the singles main draw:

- (Australia) Alex Bolt
- (Belgium) Germain Gigounon

The following players received entry from the qualifying draw:

- (Netherlands) Wesley Koolhof
- (Chile) Christian Garin
- (Ukraine) Artem Smirnov
- (Serbia) Miljan Zekić

=== Withdrawals ===
Before the tournament

- (Spain) Roberto Carballés Baena
- (Brazil) Guilherme Clezar
- (Argentina) Andrea Collarini
- (France) Lucas Pouille

== Doubles main-draw entrants ==
=== Seeds ===
| Country | Player | Country | Player | Rank | Seed |
|---|---|---|---|---|---|
| POL | Tomasz Bednarek | FIN | Henri Kontinen | 141 | 1 |
| SWE | Andreas Siljeström | SVK | Igor Zelenay | 249 | 2 |
| USA | James Cerretani | GER | Frank Moser | 270 | 3 |
| POL | Piotr Gadomski | NED | Wesley Koolhof | 409 | 4 |

=== Other entrants ===
The following pairs received wildcards into the doubles main draw:

- (Poland) Marcin Gawron / (Poland) Grzegorz Panfil
- (Poland) Mateusz Kowalczyk / (Poland) Maciej Smoła
- (Poland) Kamil Majchrzak / (Poland) Jan Zieliński

The following pair received entry from the qualifying draw:

- (Poland) Karol Drzewiecki / (Poland) Piotr Łomacki

== Champions ==
=== Singles ===
(Belgium) David Goffin def. (Slovenia) Blaž Rola, 6–4, 6–2

=== Doubles ===
(Moldova) Radu Albot / (Czech Republic) Adam Pavlásek def. (Poland) Tomasz Bednarek / (Finland) Henri Kontinen, 7–5, 2–6, [10–8]
