= 2013 Poznań Open – Singles =

Singles
- 2013 Poznań Open

Final
- Champion: (Austria) Andreas Haider-Maurer
- Runner-up: (Bosnia and Herzegovina) Damir Džumhur
- Score: 4–6, 6–1, 7–5

Events
Singles	Doubles
← 2012 ·	Poznań Open	· 2014 →

Jerzy Janowicz was the defending champion, but he did not participate that year.
Andreas Haider-Maurer won the title, defeating Damir Džumhur in the final, 4–6, 6–1, 7–5.

== Seeds ==
1. (Austria) Andreas Haider-Maurer (champion)
2. (France) Guillaume Rufin (first round)
3. (Portugal) João Sousa (quarterfinals)
4. (Spain) Pablo Carreño Busta (semifinals)
5. (France) Stéphane Robert (semifinals)
6. (Netherlands) Jesse Huta Galung (first round)
7. (Germany) Simon Greul (second round)
8. (Germany) Peter Gojowczyk (second round)

== Draw ==
=== Key ===
- Q = Qualifier
- WC = Wild card
- LL = Lucky loser
- Alt = Alternate
- SE = Special exempt
- PR = Protected ranking
- ITF = ITF entry
- JE = Junior exempt
- w/o = Walkover
- r = Retired
- d = Defaulted
- SR = Special ranking

=== Finals ===
Semifinals
1	(Austria) Andreas Haider-Maurer	6	6
4	(Spain) Pablo Carreño Busta	2	2
5	(France) Stéphane Robert	7^{7}	6^{1}	3
(Bosnia and Herzegovina) Damir Džumhur	6^{3}	7^{7}	6

Final
1	(Austria) Andreas Haider-Maurer	4	6	7
(Bosnia and Herzegovina) Damir Džumhur	6	1	5

=== Top half ===
First round
1	(Austria) A Haider-Maurer	6	6
(Croatia) A Veić	3	3
Q	(Brazil) T Monteiro	5	6	6
WC	(Poland) Piotr Gadomski	7	4	3
WC	(Poland) K Majchrzak	4	6	2
(Switzerland) H Laaksonen	6	2	6
(Brazil) L Kirche	4	4
7	(Germany) S Greul	6	6
4	(Spain) P Carreño Busta	2	6	6
Q	(Serbia) F Krajinović	6	4	4
(Brazil) G Clezar	7	6
(Slovakia) N Gomboš	5	4
Q	(Poland) A Kapaś	3	7	6^{8}
(France) J Eysseric	6	5	7^{10}
(Spain) R Carballés Baena	6	6
6	(Netherlands) J Huta Galung	4	1

Second round
1	(Austria) A Haider-Maurer	6	6
Q	(Brazil) T Monteiro	2	3
(Switzerland) H Laaksonen	6	7^{7}
7	(Germany) S Greul	1	6^{4}
4	(Spain) P Carreño Busta	7	6
(Brazil) G Clezar	5	1
(France) J Eysseric	4	3
(Spain) R Carballés Baena	6	6

Quarterfinals
1	(Austria) A Haider-Maurer	6	5	7^{7}
(Switzerland) H Laaksonen	3	7	6^{2}
4	(Spain) P Carreño Busta	3	6	7^{7}
(Spain) R Carballés Baena	6	0	6^{5}

Semifinals
1	(Austria) A Haider-Maurer	6	6
4	(Spain) P Carreño Busta	2	2

=== Bottom half ===
First round
5	(France) S Robert	6	7^{7}
(Slovakia) J Kovalík	1	6^{2}
(Czech Republic) J Mertl	6	7
WC	(Poland) Wojciech Lutkowski	2	5
PR	(Germany) A Beck	4	6^{5}
(Netherlands) B Westerhof	6	7^{7}
(Moldova) R Albot	1	2
3	(Portugal) J Sousa	6	6
8	(Germany) P Gojowczyk	6	6
Q	(United Kingdom) D Smethurst	4	2
WC	(Poland) G Panfil	6	6
(Austria) G Melzer	2	1
(Germany) B Phau	6	6
(France) N Renavand	2	4
(Bosnia and Herzegovina) D Džumhur	7^{7}	6
2	(France) G Rufin	6^{5}	3

Second round
5	(France) S Robert	7^{7}	7^{7}
(Czech Republic) J Mertl	6^{4}	6^{1}
(Netherlands) B Westerhof	3	1
3	(Portugal) J Sousa	6	6
8	(Germany) P Gojowczyk	3	7	3
WC	(Poland) G Panfil	6	5	6
(Germany) B Phau	2	1
(Bosnia and Herzegovina) D Džumhur	6	6

Quarterfinals
5	(France) S Robert	6^{4}	6	6
3	(Portugal) J Sousa	7^{7}	2	4
WC	(Poland) G Panfil	4	4
(Bosnia and Herzegovina) D Džumhur	6	6

Semifinals
5	(France) S Robert	7^{7}	6^{1}	3
(Bosnia and Herzegovina) D Džumhur	6^{3}	7^{7}	6
