= 2019 Open BNP Paribas Banque de Bretagne – Doubles =

Doubles
- 2019 Open BNP Paribas Banque de Bretagne

Final
- Champions: (France) Fabrice Martin (France) Hugo Nys
- Runners-up: (Netherlands) David Pel (Croatia) Antonio Šančić
- Score: 6–4, 6–2

Events
Singles	Doubles
← 2018 ·	Open BNP Paribas Banque de Bretagne	· 2020 →

Ken and Neal Skupski were the defending champions but chose not to defend their title.

Fabrice Martin and Hugo Nys won the title after defeating David Pel and Antonio Šančić 6–4, 6–2 in the final.

== Seeds ==
1. (Chinese Taipei) Hsieh Cheng-peng / (Indonesia) Christopher Rungkat (first round)
2. (France) Fabrice Martin / (France) Hugo Nys (champions)
3. (Netherlands) Sander Arends / (Austria) Tristan-Samuel Weissborn (semifinals)
4. (Germany) Andre Begemann / (Australia) Rameez Junaid (first round)

== Draw ==
=== Key ===
- Q = Qualifier
- WC = Wild card
- LL = Lucky loser
- Alt = Alternate
- SE = Special exempt
- PR = Protected ranking
- ITF = ITF entry
- JE = Junior exempt
- w/o = Walkover
- r = Retired
- d = Defaulted
- SR = Special ranking

First round
1	(Chinese Taipei) C-p Hsieh (Indonesia) C Rungkat	6^{4}	6^{3}
(Netherlands) D Pel (Croatia) A Šančić	7^{7}	7^{7}
(Italy) F Baldi (Switzerland) L Margaroli	6	6
ITF	(France) G Jacq (France) Hugo Voljacques	1	4
4	(Germany) A Begemann (Australia) R Junaid	6^{5}	4
(Poland) H Hurkacz (Poland) S Walków	7^{7}	6
(Spain) A Menéndez Maceiras (Ukraine) S Stakhovsky	6^{5}	6	[10]
(France) J Eysseric (France) Q Halys	7^{7}	3	[6]
WC	(France) E Benchetrit (France) G Blancaneaux	6	6
(United Kingdom) S Clayton (Canada) A Shamasdin	3	4
ITF	(Spain) J Barranco Cosano (Italy) R Brancaccio	2	6	[5]
3	(Netherlands) S Arends (Austria) T-S Weissborn	6	4	[10]
WC	(France) Antoine Cornut-Chauvinc (France) H Gaston	4	2
(Brazil) F Neis (Spain) D Vega Hernández	6	6
WC	(France) E Furness (France) M Guinard	5	3
2	(France) F Martin (France) H Nys	7	6

Quarterfinals
(Netherlands) D Pel (Croatia) A Šančić	7	6
(Italy) F Baldi (Switzerland) L Margaroli	5	4
(Poland) H Hurkacz (Poland) S Walków	6	6
(Spain) A Menéndez Maceiras (Ukraine) S Stakhovsky	2	3
WC	(France) E Benchetrit (France) G Blancaneaux	2	6	[2]
3	(Netherlands) S Arends (Austria) T-S Weissborn	6	3	[10]
(Brazil) F Neis (Spain) D Vega Hernández	6^{7}	4
2	(France) F Martin (France) H Nys	7^{9}	6

Semifinals
(Netherlands) D Pel (Croatia) A Šančić	7^{7}	6^{3}	[10]
(Poland) H Hurkacz (Poland) S Walków	6^{1}	7^{7}	[4]
3	(Netherlands) S Arends (Austria) T-S Weissborn	3	4
2	(France) F Martin (France) H Nys	6	6

Final
(Netherlands) D Pel (Croatia) A Šančić	4	2
2	(France) F Martin (France) H Nys	6	6
