= 2019 Poznań Open =

- Date: 3–9 June
- Edition: 16th
- Surface: Clay
- Location: Poznań, Poland
- Venue: Park Tenisowy Olimpia

Champions

Singles
- (Spain) Tommy Robredo

Doubles
- (Italy) Andrea Vavassori / (Spain) David Vega Hernández
- Poznań Open

The 2019 Poznań Open was a professional tennis tournament played on clay courts. It was the sixteenth edition of the tournament which was part of the 2019 ATP Challenger Tour. It took place at the Park Tenisowy Olimpia in Poznań, Poland from 3 to 9 June 2019.

== Singles main-draw entrants ==
=== Seeds ===
| Country | Player | Rank^{1} | Seed |
|---|---|---|---|
| POL | Hubert Hurkacz | 44 | 1 |
| ESP | Roberto Carballés Baena | 76 | 2 |
| AUT | Dennis Novak | 113 | 3 |
| SWE | Elias Ymer | 115 | 4 |
| POR | Pedro Sousa | 124 | 5 |
| ESP | Pedro Martínez | 134 | 6 |
| AUT | Sebastian Ofner | 140 | 7 |
| ITA | Gianluca Mager | 142 | 8 |
| GER | Oscar Otte | 144 | 9 |
| FRA | Quentin Halys | 151 | 10 |
| POR | João Domingues | 160 | 11 |
| ITA | Filippo Baldi | 163 | 12 |
| ITA | Alessandro Giannessi | 164 | 13 |
| ESP | Enrique López Pérez | 166 | 14 |
| GER | Rudolf Molleker | 173 | 15 |
| SLO | Blaž Rola | 183 | 16 |

- ^{1} Rankings are as of 27 May 2019.

=== Other entrants ===
The following players received wildcards into the singles main draw:

- (Poland) Michał Dembek
- (Poland) Hubert Hurkacz
- (Poland) Wojciech Marek
- (Poland) Daniel Michalski
- (Poland) Kacper Żuk

The following player received entry into the singles main draw using a protected ranking:

- (Germany) Daniel Altmaier

The following players received entry into the singles main draw using their ITF World Tennis Ranking:

- (United States) Sekou Bangoura
- (Spain) Javier Barranco Cosano
- (Italy) Raúl Brancaccio
- (Belgium) Christopher Heyman
- (Italy) Pietro Rondoni

The following players received entry from the qualifying draw:

- (Italy) Jacopo Berrettini
- (Italy) Andrea Vavassori

== Champions ==
=== Singles ===
- (Spain) Tommy Robredo def. (Germany) Rudolf Molleker 5–7, 6–4, 6–1.

=== Doubles ===
- (Italy) Andrea Vavassori / (Spain) David Vega Hernández def. (Spain) Pedro Martínez / (Netherlands) Mark Vervoort 6–4, 6–7^{(4–7)}, [10–6].
