= 2017 Open BNP Paribas Banque de Bretagne – Doubles =

Doubles
- 2017 Open BNP Paribas Banque de Bretagne

Final
- Champions: (Russia) Mikhail Elgin (Slovakia) Igor Zelenay
- Runners-up: (United Kingdom) Ken Skupski (United Kingdom) Neal Skupski
- Score: 2–6, 7–5, [10–5]

Events
Singles	Doubles
- Open BNP Paribas Banque de Bretagne

Tristan Lamasine and Albano Olivetti were the defending champions but only Olivetti chose to defend his title, partnering Kevin Krawietz. Olivetti lost in the first round to Ken and Neal Skupski.

Mikhail Elgin and Igor Zelenay won the title after defeating Skupski and Skupski 2–6, 7–5, [10–5] in the final.

== Seeds ==
1. (India) Purav Raja / (India) Divij Sharan (quarterfinals)
2. (United Kingdom) Ken Skupski / (United Kingdom) Neal Skupski (final)
3. (Czech Republic) Roman Jebavý / (Croatia) Antonio Šančić (quarterfinals)
4. (Peru) Sergio Galdós / (Brazil) Fabrício Neis (first round)

== Draw ==
Key

- Q = Qualifier
- WC = Wild card
- LL = Lucky loser
- Alt = Alternate
- ITF = ITF entry
- PR = Protected ranking
- SR = Special ranking
- SE = Special exempt
- JE = Junior exempt
- JR = Junior Accelerator Programme entrant
- CO = College Accelerator Programme entrant
- NG = Next Gen Accelerator Program entrant
- w/o = Walkover
- r = Retired
- d = Defaulted

First round
1	(India) P Raja (India) D Sharan	6^{4}	6	[11]
(France) J Eysseric (Ukraine) S Stakhovsky	7^{7}	3	[9]
(Australia) R Junaid (Germany) A Mies	5	6^{3}
(Uruguay) A Behar (Kazakhstan) A Golubev	7	7^{7}
3	(Czech Republic) R Jebavý (Croatia) A Šančić	6	5	[10]
(Russia) E Donskoy (Belarus) A Vasilevski	4	7	[5]
(Russia) M Elgin (Slovakia) I Zelenay	7^{7}	6
(Austria) J Knowle (Austria) J Melzer	6^{5}	2
(Chinese Taipei) H-y Peng (Belgium) J Vliegen	6	3	[8]
(Canada) S Diez (Spain) E López-Pérez	3	6	[10]
WC	(France) G Jacq (France) H Nys	6	6
4	(Peru) S Galdós (Brazil) F Neis	4	1
WC	(France) G Blancaneaux (France) M Gicquel	w/o
Alt	(Germany) P Gojowczyk (Japan) H Moriya
(Germany) K Krawietz (France) A Olivetti	2	4
2	(United Kingdom) K Skupski (United Kingdom) N Skupski	6	6

Quarterfinals
1	(India) P Raja (India) D Sharan	6^{0}	6	[6]
(Uruguay) A Behar (Kazakhstan) A Golubev	7^{7}	4	[10]
3	(Czech Republic) R Jebavý (Croatia) A Šančić	6	3	[8]
(Russia) M Elgin (Slovakia) I Zelenay	2	6	[10]
(Canada) S Diez (Spain) E López-Pérez	6^{3}	3
WC	(France) G Jacq (France) H Nys	7^{7}	6
WC	(France) G Blancaneaux (France) M Gicquel	0	4
2	(United Kingdom) K Skupski (United Kingdom) N Skupski	6	6

Semifinals
(Uruguay) A Behar (Kazakhstan) A Golubev	6	4	[8]
(Russia) M Elgin (Slovakia) I Zelenay	3	6	[10]
WC	(France) G Jacq (France) H Nys	1	2
2	(United Kingdom) K Skupski (United Kingdom) N Skupski	6	6

Final
(Russia) M Elgin (Slovakia) I Zelenay	2	7	[10]
2	(United Kingdom) K Skupski (United Kingdom) N Skupski	6	5	[5]
