= 2016 Open BNP Paribas Banque de Bretagne – Singles =

Singles
- 2016 Open BNP Paribas Banque de Bretagne

Final
- Champion: (Russia) Andrey Rublev
- Runner-up: (France) Paul-Henri Mathieu
- Score: 6–7^{(6–8)} , 6–4 , 6–4

Events
Singles	Doubles
- Open BNP Paribas Banque de Bretagne

Benoît Paire was the defending champion, but chose not to defend his title.

Andrey Rublev won the title, defeating Paul-Henri Mathieu 6–7^{(6–8)} , 6–4, 6–4 in the final.

== Seeds ==
1. (France) Paul-Henri Mathieu (final)
2. (Ukraine) Sergiy Stakhovsky (withdrew due to low back injury)
3. (Germany) Jan-Lennard Struff (second round)
4. (Slovakia) Lukáš Lacko (quarterfinals)
5. (France) Pierre-Hugues Herbert (withdrew due to general fatigue)
6. (Czech Republic) Adam Pavlásek (first round)
7. (France) Kenny de Schepper (first round)
8. (Russia) Karen Khachanov (second round)

== Draw ==
Key

- Q = Qualifier
- WC = Wild card
- LL = Lucky loser
- Alt = Alternate
- ITF = ITF entry
- PR = Protected ranking
- SR = Special ranking
- SE = Special exempt
- JE = Junior exempt
- JR = Junior Accelerator Programme entrant
- CO = College Accelerator Programme entrant
- NG = Next Gen Accelerator Program entrant
- w/o = Walkover
- r = Retired
- d = Defaulted

=== Finals ===
Semifinals
1	(France) Paul-Henri Mathieu	6	1	6
LL	(Croatia) Nikola Mektić	4	6	4
Q	(Russia) Andrey Rublev	w/o
2	(Ukraine) Sergiy Stakhovsky

Final
1	(France) Paul-Henri Mathieu	7^{8}	4	4
Q	(Russia) Andrey Rublev	6^{6}	6	6

=== Top half ===
First round
1	(France) P-H Mathieu	6	6
(France) V Millot	1	2
WC	(France) G Barrère	6	6^{3}	4
(Bosnia and Herzegovina) A Šetkić	3	7^{7}	6
(Italy) A Arnaboldi	6^{3}	6	2
(Netherlands) I Sijsling	7^{7}	3	6
(Uzbekistan) F Dustov	7^{7}	4	6
7	(France) K de Schepper	6^{4}	6	3
3	(Germany) J-L Struff	6	6
(Italy) F Gaio	4	1
Q	(Germany) T Kamke	7	6
(Argentina) M Trungelliti	5	1
(France) C Lestienne	1	7	4
(France) D Guez	6	5	6
(France) Q Halys	3	2
LL	(Croatia) N Mektić	6	6

Second round
1	(France) P-H Mathieu	2	7^{8}	6
(Bosnia and Herzegovina) A Šetkić	6	6^{6}	3
(Netherlands) I Sijsling	6	6
(Uzbekistan) F Dustov	1	4
3	(Germany) J-L Struff	3	5
Q	(Germany) T Kamke	6	7
(France) D Guez	4	2
LL	(Croatia) N Mektić	6	6

Quarterfinals
1	(France) P-H Mathieu	7	0
(Netherlands) I Sijsling	5	0^{r}
Q	(Germany) T Kamke	6	6^{5}	4
LL	(Croatia) N Mektić	2	7^{7}	6

Semifinals
1	(France) P-H Mathieu	6	1	6
LL	(Croatia) N Mektić	4	6	4

=== Bottom half ===
First round
8	(Russia) K Khachanov	6	7^{9}
(France) T Lamasine	4	6^{7}
WC	(France) A Olivetti	4	6^{9}
Q	(Russia) A Rublev	6	7^{11}
WC	(France) Maxime Tabatruong	2	6	2
(France) C Hemery	6	1	6
WC	(France) M Teixeira	5	4
4	(Slovakia) L Lacko	7	6
6	(Czech Republic) A Pavlásek	4	3
Q	(France) R Jouan	6	6
(United Kingdom) J Ward	6	6
(Italy) S Caruso	4	4
(Belarus) U Ignatik	2	6	2
Q	(France) A Sidorenko	6	4	6
(Russia) A Karatsev	6^{9}	6^{6}
2	(Ukraine) S Stakhovsky	7^{11}	7^{8}

Second round
8	(Russia) K Khachanov	6^{10}	5
Q	(Russia) A Rublev	7^{12}	7
(France) C Hemery	2	0^{r}
4	(Slovakia) L Lacko	6	0
Q	(France) R Jouan	6	6
(United Kingdom) J Ward	4	4
Q	(France) A Sidorenko	4	6^{3}
2	(Ukraine) S Stakhovsky	6	7^{7}

Quarterfinals
Q	(Russia) A Rublev	6	3	7^{7}
4	(Slovakia) L Lacko	4	6	6^{5}
Q	(France) R Jouan	4	7^{7}	1
2	(Ukraine) S Stakhovsky	6	6^{3}	6

Semifinals
Q	(Russia) A Rublev	w/o
2	(Ukraine) S Stakhovsky
