= 2015 Poznań Open – Doubles =

Doubles
- 2015 Poznań Open

Final
- Champions: (Russia) Michail Elgin (Poland) Mateusz Kowalczyk
- Runners-up: (Chile) Julio Peralta (United States) Matt Seeberger
- Score: 3–6, 6–3, [10–6]

Events
Singles	Doubles
- Poznań Open

Radu Albot and Adam Pavlásek were the defending champions, but Albot decided not to participate, and Pavlásek played alongside Jan Šátral instead, but they lost in the first round to Michał Dembek and Viktor Kostin.

Michail Elgin and Mateusz Kowalczyk won the title, defeating Julio Peralta and Matt Seeberger in the final, 3–6, 6–3, [10–6].

== Seeds ==
1. (Russia) Michail Elgin / (Poland) Mateusz Kowalczyk (champions)
2. (Argentina) Guillermo Durán / (Peru) Sergio Galdós (quarterfinals)
3. (Poland) Tomasz Bednarek / (Germany) Alexander Satschko (quarterfinals)
4. (Chile) Julio Peralta / (United States) Matt Seeberger (final)

== Draw ==
Key

- Q = Qualifier
- WC = Wild card
- LL = Lucky loser
- Alt = Alternate
- ITF = ITF entry
- PR = Protected ranking
- SR = Special ranking
- SE = Special exempt
- JE = Junior exempt
- JR = Junior Accelerator Programme entrant
- CO = College Accelerator Programme entrant
- NG = Next Gen Accelerator Program entrant
- w/o = Walkover
- r = Retired
- d = Defaulted

=== Draw ===
First round
1	(Russia) M Elgin (Poland) M Kowalczyk	5	6	[10]
WC	(Poland) H Hurkacz (Poland) J Zieliński	7	4	[2]
(France) M Bourgue (France) L Pouille	3	4
WC	(Romania) VV Cornea (Poland) K Drzewiecki	6	6
3	(Poland) T Bednarek (Germany) A Satschko	7	6
(Poland) A Kapaś (Poland) G Panfil	5	1
(Spain) Í Cervantes (Spain) P Riba	6	6
(Romania) P Grigoriu (Serbia) Ilija Vučić	3	3
(Belarus) M Dubarenco (Russia) A Kudryavtsev	6	7^{7}
(Brazil) A Ghem (Brazil) J Souza	1	6^{4}
Q	(Czech Republic) Michal Konečný (Czech Republic) Petr Michnev	4	2
4	(Chile) J Peralta (United States) M Seeberger	6	6
(Czech Republic) A Pavlásek (Czech Republic) J Šátral	3	6	[7]
WC	(Poland) Michał Dembek (Germany) Viktor Kostin	6	1	[10]
(Brazil) R Dutra Silva (Spain) D Muñoz de la Nava
2	(Argentina) G Durán (Peru) S Galdós	w/o

Quarterfinals
1	(Russia) M Elgin (Poland) M Kowalczyk	6	6
WC	(Romania) VV Cornea (Poland) K Drzewiecki	4	3
3	(Poland) T Bednarek (Germany) A Satschko	6^{3}	5
(Spain) Í Cervantes (Spain) P Riba	7^{7}	7
(Belarus) M Dubarenco (Russia) A Kudryavtsev
4	(Chile) J Peralta (United States) M Seeberger	w/o
WC	(Poland) M Dembek (Germany) V Kostin	7^{7}	6
2	(Argentina) G Durán (Peru) S Galdós	6^{2}	2

Semifinals
1	(Russia) M Elgin (Poland) M Kowalczyk	7^{7}	6
(Spain) Í Cervantes (Spain) P Riba	6^{3}	2
4	(Chile) J Peralta (United States) M Seeberger	6	7^{7}
WC	(Poland) M Dembek (Germany) V Kostin	2	6^{2}

Final
1	(Russia) M Elgin (Poland) M Kowalczyk	3	6	[10]
4	(Chile) J Peralta (United States) M Seeberger	6	3	[6]
