= 2017 Poznań Open – Doubles =

Doubles
- 2017 Poznań Open

Final
- Champions: (Argentina) Guido Andreozzi (Spain) Jaume Munar
- Runners-up: (Poland) Tomasz Bednarek (Portugal) Gonçalo Oliveira
- Score: 6–7^{(4–7)}, 6–3, [10–4]

Events
Singles	Doubles
- Poznań Open

Aleksandre Metreveli and Peng Hsien-yin were the defending champions but chose not to defend their title.

Guido Andreozzi and Jaume Munar won the title after defeating Tomasz Bednarek and Gonçalo Oliveira 6–7^{(4–7)}, 6–3, [10–4] in the final.

== Seeds ==
1. (Poland) Mateusz Kowalczyk / (Germany) Andreas Mies (first round)
2. (Australia) Rameez Junaid / (Slovakia) Igor Zelenay (semifinals)
3. (France) Jonathan Eysseric / (Brazil) André Ghem (first round)
4. (Poland) Tomasz Bednarek / (Portugal) Gonçalo Oliveira (final)

== Draw ==
Key

- Q = Qualifier
- WC = Wild card
- LL = Lucky loser
- Alt = Alternate
- ITF = ITF entry
- PR = Protected ranking
- SR = Special ranking
- SE = Special exempt
- JE = Junior exempt
- JR = Junior Accelerator Programme entrant
- CO = College Accelerator Programme entrant
- NG = Next Gen Accelerator Program entrant
- w/o = Walkover
- r = Retired
- d = Defaulted

First round
1	(Poland) M Kowalczyk (Germany) A Mies	3	5
(Czech Republic) Z Kolář (Czech Republic) Petr Michnev	6	7
(Spain) R Ramírez Hidalgo (Norway) C Ruud	3	3
(Poland) K Majchrzak (Poland) G Panfil	6	6
4	(Poland) T Bednarek (Portugal) G Oliveira	6	4	[10]
(Australia) S Puodziunas (United States) H Reese	4	6	[3]
(Brazil) G Clezar (Austria) M Linzer	7^{7}	2	[9]
WC	(Romania) VV Cornea (Poland) K Drzewiecki	6^{5}	6	[11]
(Argentina) M Kestelboim (Argentina) A Velotti	2	6	[6]
(Argentina) G Andreozzi (Spain) J Munar	6	3	[10]
WC	(Poland) Michał Dembek (Poland) Maciej Smoła	3	6	[10]
3	(France) J Eysseric (Brazil) A Ghem	6	3	[2]
WC	(Poland) H Hurkacz (Poland) S Walków	6	4	[10]
(Ukraine) D Kalenichenko (Serbia) P Krstin	3	6	[8]
(India) S Balaji (India) VS Prashanth	4	4
2	(Australia) R Junaid (Slovakia) I Zelenay	6	6

Quarterfinals
(Czech Republic) Z Kolář (Czech Republic) P Michnev	5	6	[10]
(Poland) K Majchrzak (Poland) G Panfil	7	3	[12]
4	(Poland) T Bednarek (Portugal) G Oliveira	6	6
WC	(Romania) VV Cornea (Poland) K Drzewiecki	2	4
(Argentina) G Andreozzi (Spain) J Munar	6	6
WC	(Poland) M Dembek (Poland) M Smoła	4	4
WC	(Poland) H Hurkacz (Poland) S Walków	3	4
2	(Australia) R Junaid (Slovakia) I Zelenay	6	6

Semifinals
(Poland) K Majchrzak (Poland) G Panfil	1	3
4	(Poland) T Bednarek (Portugal) G Oliveira	6	6
(Argentina) G Andreozzi (Spain) J Munar	6	6
2	(Australia) R Junaid (Slovakia) I Zelenay	2	4

Final
4	(Poland) T Bednarek (Portugal) G Oliveira	7^{7}	3	[4]
(Argentina) G Andreozzi (Spain) J Munar	6^{4}	6	[10]
