= 2017 Poznań Open =

- Date: 15–23 July
- Edition: 14th
- Draw: 32S/32Q/16D
- Prize money: €64,000+H
- Surface: Clay
- Location: Poznań, Poland
- Venue: Park Tenisowy Olimpia

Champions

Singles
- (Russia) Alexey Vatutin

Doubles
- (Argentina) Guido Andreozzi / (Spain) Jaume Munar
- Poznań Open

The 2017 Poznań Open is a professional tennis tournament played on clay courts. It is the fourteenth edition of the tournament which is part of the 2017 ATP Challenger Tour. It takes place at the Park Tenisowy Olimpia in Poznań, Poland from 15 to 23 July 2017, including the qualifying competition in the first two days.

== Singles main-draw entrants ==
=== Seeds ===
Country	Player	Rank^{1}	Seed
NOR	Casper Ruud	111	1
GER	Florian Mayer	114	2
CZE	Adam Pavlásek	136	3
POL	Jerzy Janowicz	141	4
CZE	Jan Šátral	142	5
ARG	Guido Andreozzi	157	6
ESP	Rubén Ramírez Hidalgo	172	7
CZE	Lukáš Rosol	215	8

- ^{1} Rankings are as of 3 July 2017.

=== Other entrants ===
The following players received wildcards into the singles main draw:

- (Romania) Victor Vlad Cornea
- (Poland) Michał Dembek
- (Poland) Hubert Hurkacz
- (Poland) Andriej Kapaś

The following players received entry from the qualifying draw:

- (Ukraine) Danylo Kalenichenko
- (Argentina) Mariano Kestelboim
- (Sweden) Jonathan Mridha
- (Poland) Maciej Rajski

== Champions ==
=== Singles ===
- (Russia) Alexey Vatutin def. (Argentina) Guido Andreozzi 2–6, 7–6^{(12–10)}, 6–3.

=== Doubles ===
- (Argentina) Guido Andreozzi / (Spain) Jaume Munar def. (Poland) Tomasz Bednarek / (Portugal) Gonçalo Oliveira 6–7^{(4–7)}, 6–3, [10–4].
