= 2017 Poznań Open – Singles =

Singles
- 2017 Poznań Open

Final
- Champion: (Russia) Alexey Vatutin
- Runner-up: (Argentina) Guido Andreozzi
- Score: 2–6, 7–6^{(12–10)}, 6–3

Events
| Singles | Doubles |
- Poznań Open

Radu Albot was the defending champion but chose not to defend his title.

Alexey Vatutin won the title after defeating Guido Andreozzi 2–6, 7–6^{(12–10)}, 6–3 in the final.

== Seeds ==
1. (Norway) Casper Ruud (second round)
2. (Germany) Florian Mayer (second round)
3. (Czech Republic) Adam Pavlásek (semifinals)
4. (Poland) Jerzy Janowicz (second round)
5. (Czech Republic) Jan Šátral (second round)
6. (Argentina) Guido Andreozzi (final)
7. (Spain) Rubén Ramírez Hidalgo (quarterfinals)
8. (Czech Republic) Lukáš Rosol (quarterfinals)

== Draw ==
Key

- Q = Qualifier
- WC = Wild card
- LL = Lucky loser
- Alt = Alternate
- ITF = ITF entry
- PR = Protected ranking
- SR = Special ranking
- SE = Special exempt
- JE = Junior exempt
- JR = Junior Accelerator Programme entrant
- CO = College Accelerator Programme entrant
- NG = Next Gen Accelerator Program entrant
- w/o = Walkover
- r = Retired
- d = Defaulted

=== Finals ===
Semifinals
6 | (Argentina) Guido Andreozzi | 3 | 6 | 6
3 | (Czech Republic) Adam Pavlásek | 6 | 2 | 2
(Portugal) Gonçalo Oliveira | 6 | 5 | 2
(Russia) Alexey Vatutin | 2 | 7 | 6

Final
6 | (Argentina) Guido Andreozzi | 6 | 6^{10} | 3
(Russia) Alexey Vatutin | 2 | 7^{12} | 6

=== Top half ===
First round
1 | (Norway) C Ruud | 6 | 6
WC | (Romania) VV Cornea | 2 | 3
(Czech Republic) Z Kolař | 6 | 6
(Czech Republic) Marek Jaloviec | 1 | 0
(Uzbekistan) S Fayziev | 2 | 4
(Poland) K Majchrzak | 6 | 6
(Austria) M Linzer | 3 | 6 | 3
6 | (Argentina) G Andreozzi | 6 | 4 | 6
3 | (Czech Republic) A Pavlásek | 7 | 6
Q | (Sweden) J Mridha | 5 | 2
(Serbia) P Krstin | 4 | 6 | 6
WC | (Poland) A Kapaś | 6 | 1 | 4
Q | (Argentina) M Kestelboim | 6 | 6
(India) S Balaji | 4 | 4
Q | (Poland) Maciej Rajski | 4 | 1
7 | (Spain) R Ramírez Hidalgo | 6 | 6

Second round
1 | (Norway) C Ruud | 6^{5} | 4
(Czech Republic) Z Kolař | 7^{7} | 6
(Poland) K Majchrzak | 4 | 7 | 0
6 | (Argentina) G Andreozzi | 6 | 5 | 6
3 | (Czech Republic) A Pavlásek | 6 | 6
(Serbia) P Krstin | 1 | 0
Q | (Argentina) M Kestelboim | 3 | 2
7 | (Spain) R Ramírez Hidalgo | 6 | 6

Quarterfinals
(Czech Republic) Z Kolař | 5 | 6 | 0
6 | (Argentina) G Andreozzi | 7 | 3 | 6
3 | (Czech Republic) A Pavlásek | 6 | 6
7 | (Spain) R Ramírez Hidalgo | 2 | 4

Semifinals
6 | (Argentina) G Andreozzi | 3 | 6 | 6
3 | (Czech Republic) A Pavlásek | 6 | 2 | 2

=== Bottom half ===
First round
5 | (Czech Republic) J Šátral | 7^{9} | 6
(Brazil) G Clezar | 6^{7} | 0
(France) J Eysseric | 6 | 6
WC | (Poland) H Hurkacz | 3 | 4
(Portugal) G Oliveira | 6 | 6
(Czech Republic) Petr Michnev | 2 | 4
(Spain) J Munar | 6^{1} | 2
4 | (Poland) J Janowicz | 7^{7} | 6
8 | (Czech Republic) L Rosol | 6 | 4 | 6
(Argentina) A Velotti | 4 | 6 | 3
WC | (Poland) Michał Dembek | 6 | 6
(Belgium) Y Reuter | 4 | 2
(Russia) A Vatutin | 7^{7} | 6
(Kazakhstan) A Nedovyesov | 6^{1} | 3
Q | (Ukraine) D Kalenichenko | 1 | 4
2 | (Germany) F Mayer | 6 | 6

Second round
5 | (Czech Republic) J Šátral | 5 | 1
(France) J Eysseric | 7 | 6
(Portugal) G Oliveira | 5 | 6 | 6
4 | (Poland) J Janowicz | 7 | 2 | 4
8 | (Czech Republic) L Rosol | 7^{7} | 6
WC | (Poland) M Dembek | 6^{3} | 3
(Russia) A Vatutin | 7 | 6
2 | (Germany) F Mayer | 5 | 4

Quarterfinals
(France) J Eysseric | 6^{2} | 4
(Portugal) G Oliveira | 7^{7} | 6
8 | (Czech Republic) L Rosol | 5 | 6 | 3
(Russia) A Vatutin | 7 | 3 | 6

Semifinals
(Portugal) G Oliveira | 6 | 5 | 2
(Russia) A Vatutin | 2 | 7 | 6
