= Alexey Vatutin =

Russian tennis player

Alexey Vatutin Алексей Ватутин
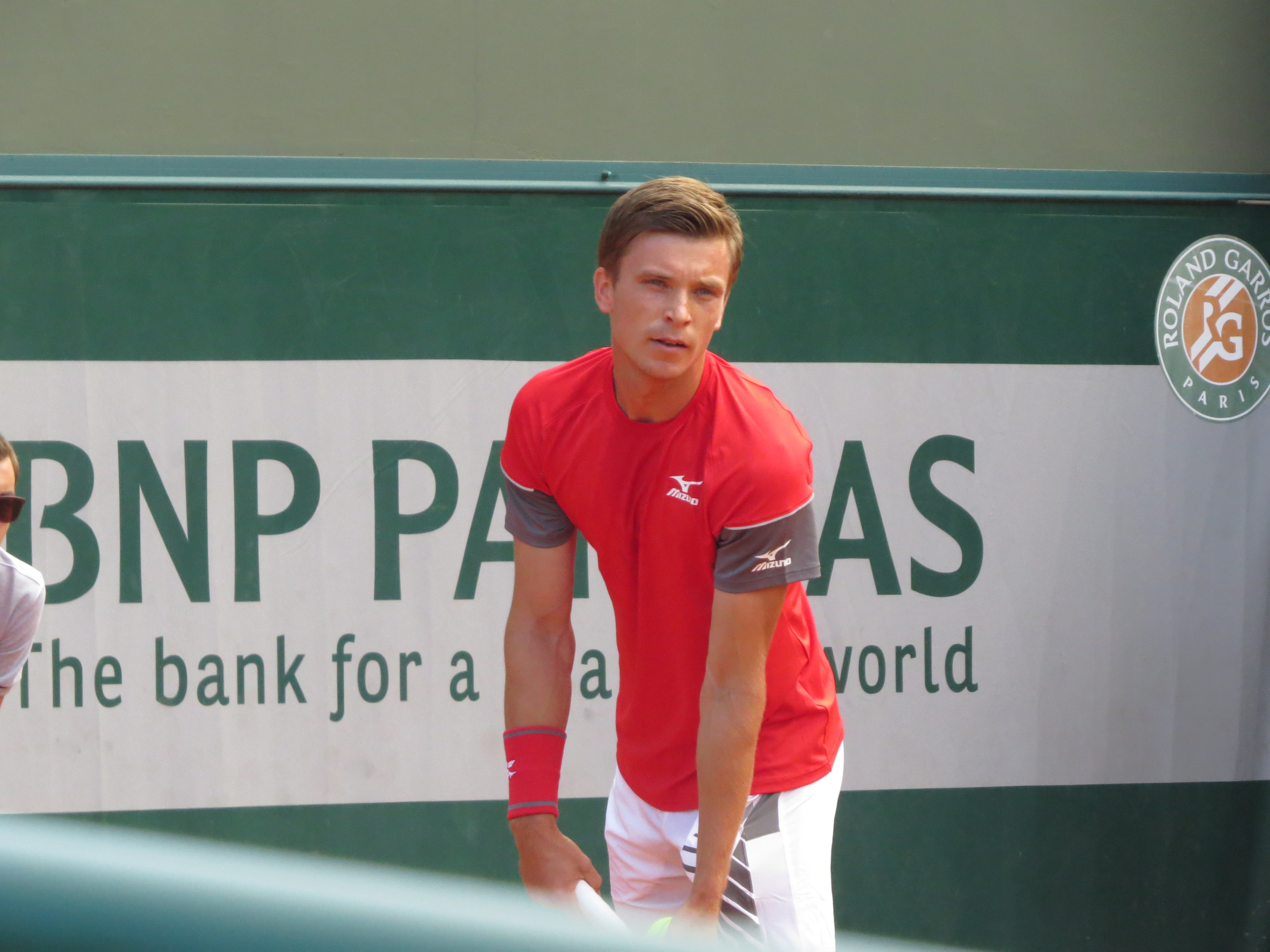
- Country (sports): Russia
- Born: 27 October 1992 (age 34) Volgograd, Russia
- Height: 1.78 m (5 ft 10 in)
- Plays: Right-handed (two handed-backhand)
- Coach: Yuriy Kozlovich, Eduard Davydenko, Andrei Gorban
- Prize money: US $676,933

Singles
- Career record: 2–7
- Career titles: 0
- Highest ranking: No. 136 (2 July 2018)
- Current ranking: No. 971 (26 October 2026)

Grand Slam singles results
- Australian Open: Q2 (2018, 2019)
- French Open: 1R (2019)
- Wimbledon: Q1 (2018, 2019)
- US Open: Q2 (2018)

Doubles
- Career record: 0–1
- Career titles: 0
- Highest ranking: No. 510 (10 June 2019)

Alexey Vatutin (Russian: Алексе́й Дми́триевич Вату́тин; born 27 October 1992) is a Russian tennis player. He has a career high ATP singles ranking of world No. 136 achieved on 2 July 2018 and a doubles ranking of No. 510 achieved on 10 June 2019. Vatutin competes mainly on the ATP Challenger Tour where he has won one singles title. He has also won twelve ITF singles titles.

== Career ==
In 2018 he achieved one of his best results in the ATP World Tour thus far, reaching the quarterfinal in Marrakech with an upset over top seed Albert Ramos Viñolas.

In 2023, after five years, he again qualified for the main draw in Marrakech this time as a lucky loser replacing Juan Pablo Varillas who withdrew in the last minute. He lost to Benjamin Bonzi.

Ranked No. 336, he qualified for the main draw of the 2024 European Open but lost to Hugo Gaston in the first round.

== Performance timeline ==
Key
W	F	SF	QF	#R	RR	Q#	DNQ	A	NH

(W) winner; (F) finalist; (SF) semifinalist; (QF) quarterfinalist; (#R) rounds 4, 3, 2, 1; (RR) round-robin stage; (Q#) qualification round; (DNQ) did not qualify; (A) absent; (NH) not held; (SR) strike rate (events won / competed); (W–L) win–loss record.

=== Singles ===
Tournament	2017	2018	2019	2020	2021	SR	W–L	Win %
Grand Slam tournaments
Australian Open	A	Q2	Q2	Q1	Q1	0 / 0	0–0	–
French Open	A	Q1	1R	Q1	A	0 / 1	0–1	0%
Wimbledon	A	Q1	Q1	NH	A	0 / 0	0–0	–
US Open	Q1	Q2	Q1	A	A	0 / 0	0–0	–
Win–loss	0–0	0–0	0–1	0–0	0–0	0 / 1	0–1	0%

== ATP Challenger Tour finals ==
=== Singles: 2 (1 title, 1 runner-up) ===
Legend ATP Challenger Tour (1–1)

Result	W–L	Date	Tournament	Tier	Surface	Opponent	Score
Win	1–0	Jul 2017	Poznań, Poland	Challenger	Clay	(Argentina) Guido Andreozzi	2–6, 7–6^{(12–10)}, 6–3
Loss	1–1	Jan 2018	Quimper, France	Challenger	Hard	(France) Quentin Halys	3–6, 6–7^{(1–7)}

== ITF Tour finals ==
=== Singles: 22 (12 titles, 10 runner-ups) ===
Legend ITF Futures/WTT (12–10)	Finals by surface Hard (7–5) Clay (5–4) Grass (0–0) Carpet (0–1)

Result	W–L	Date	Tournament	Tier	Surface	Opponent	Score
Win	1–0	Apr 2012	Kazakhstan F2, Astana	Futures	Hard	(Belarus) Egor Gerasimov	7–6^{(7–1)}, 6–2
Loss	1–1	Mar 2013	Russia F3, Tyumen	Futures	Hard	(Russia) Konstantin Kravchuk	3–6, 6–4, 4–6
Win	2–1	Dec 2013	Spain F41, Puerto del Carmen	Futures	Hard	(Portugal) Frederico Ferreira Silva	6–4, 6–4
Win	3–1	Mar 2014	Kazakhstan F1, Aktobe	Futures	Hard	(Kazakhstan) Evgeny Korolev	6–7^{(4–7)}, 6–4, 6–3
Loss	3–2	Jan 2015	Turkey F2, Antalya	Futures	Hard	(Brazil) José Pereira	4–6, 3–6
Win	4–2	Aug 2015	Russia F6, Moscow	Futures	Clay	(Spain) Marc Giner	7–6^{(7–4)}, 6–2
Loss	4–3	Aug 2015	Netherlands F6, Rotterdam	Futures	Clay	(France) Constant Lestienne	0–6, 4–6
Loss	4–4	Sep 2015	Russia F7, Vsevolozhsk	Futures	Clay	(Russia) Mikhail Elgin	4–6, 2–6
Win	5–4	Dec 2015	Cyprus F3, Larnaca	Futures	Hard	(Serbia) Miki Janković	6–2, 5–7, 6–3
Win	6–4	Feb 2016	Tunisia F7, Hammamet	Futures	Clay	(Austria) Michael Linzer	6–4, 6–1
Loss	6–5	Sep 2016	Russia F7, Saint Petersburg	Futures	Hard	(Russia) Evgeny Tyurnev	4–6, 6–3, 3–6
Loss	6–6	Oct 2016	Hungary F8, Balatonboglár	Futures	Clay	(Hungary) Attila Balázs	6–7^{(2–7)}, 3–6
Loss	6–7	Mar 2017	Croatia F1, Rovinj	Futures	Clay	(Spain) Pere Riba	3–6, 0–6
Win	7–7	Jul 2017	Germany F7, Trier	Futures	Clay	(Spain) Enrique López Pérez	2–6, 6–4, 6–2
Win	8–7	Dec 2017	Thailand F10, Hua Hin	Futures	Hard	(New Zealand) Rubin Statham	6–4, 6–4
Win	9–7	Dec 2017	Qatar F6, Doha	Futures	Hard	(Germany) Benjamin Hassan	6–1, 7–5
Win	10–7	Feb 2022	M15 Grenoble, France	WTT	Hard (i)	(France) Sascha Gueymard Wayenburg	6-4, 6-1
Loss	10–8	Mar 2022	M25 Portimão, Portugal	WTT	Hard	(Romania) Marius Copil	5-7, 2-6
Loss	10–9	Oct 2023	M25 Sarreguemines, France	WTT	Carpet (i)	(France) Tom Paris	2–6, 1–6
Win	11–9	Jan 2024	M15 Bagnoles de l'Orne, France	WTT	Clay (i)	(Italy) Andrea Picchione	7–5, 2–6, 6–3
Loss	11–10	Mar 2024	M25 Créteil, France	WTT	Hard (i)	(France) Alexis Gautier	1–6, 6–4, 4–6
Win	12–10	May 2024	M25 Deauville, France	WTT	Clay	(Belgium) Raphaël Collignon	6–3, 6–4

=== Doubles: 5 (1 title, 4 runner-ups) ===
Legend ITF Futures/WTT (1–4)	Finals by surface Hard (0–2) Clay (1–2) Grass (0–0) Carpet (0–0)

Result	W–L	Date	Tournament	Tier	Surface	Partner	Opponents	Score
Loss	0–1	Feb 2016	Tunisia F5, Hammamet	Futures	Clay	(Russia) Kirill Dmitriev	(Venezuela) Jordi Muñoz Abreu (Spain) David Pérez Sanz	5–7, 3–6
Loss	0–2	Mar 2024	M25 Créteil, France	WTT	Hard	Nikolay Vylegzhanin	(Czech Republic) David Poljak (Czech Republic) Matěj Vocel	3–6, 4–6
Loss	0–3	Mar 2024	M25 Saint-Dizier, France	WTT	Hard (i)	(Germany) Daniel Masur	(Switzerland) Yannik Steinegger (Germany) Tim Handel	2–6, 3–6
Loss	0–4	May 2024	M25 Deauville, France	WTT	Clay	Alexander Zgirovsky	(Netherlands) Sander Jong (Netherlands) Fons van Sambeek	3–6, 2–6
Win	1–4	Aug 2024	M25 Koksijde, Belgium	WTT	Clay	(Germany) Tom Gentzsch	(Belgium) Alessio Basile (Belgium) Noah Merre	6–3, 6–4
