= 2012 Open Prévadiès Saint–Brieuc – Singles =

Brieuc – Singles
- 2012 Open Prévadiès Saint–Brieuc

Final
- Champion: (France) Grégoire Burquier
- Runner-up: (France) Augustin Gensse
- Score: 7–5, 6–7^{(5–7)}, 7–6^{(7–3)}

Events
| Singles | Doubles |
| ← 2011 · | Open Prévadiès Saint–Brieuc | · 2013 → |

Maxime Teixeira was the defending champion.
Grégoire Burquier won the title by defeating Augustin Gensse 7–5, 6–7^{(5–7)}, 7–6^{(7–3)} in the final.

== Seeds ==
1. (Spain) Daniel Gimeno-Traver (quarterfinals)
2. (France) Stéphane Robert (second round)
3. (France) Marc Gicquel (quarterfinals)
4. (France) Maxime Teixeira (quarterfinals)
5. (France) Kenny de Schepper (first round)
6. (France) Augustin Gensse (final)
7. (Germany) Simon Greul (first round)
8. (Australia) James Duckworth (first round)

== Draw ==
=== Key ===
- Q = Qualifier
- WC = Wild card
- LL = Lucky loser
- Alt = Alternate
- SE = Special exempt
- PR = Protected ranking
- ITF = ITF entry
- JE = Junior exempt
- w/o = Walkover
- r = Retired
- d = Defaulted
- SR = Special ranking

=== Finals ===
Semifinals
(France) Grégoire Burquier | 6^{4} | 6 | 3
WC | (France) Josselin Ouanna | 7^{7} | 4 | 2^{r}
(Germany) Peter Gojowczyk | 7 | 1 | 4
6 | (France) Augustin Gensse | 5 | 6 | 6

Final
(France) Grégoire Burquier | 7 | 6^{5} | 7^{7}
6 | (France) Augustin Gensse | 5 | 7^{7} | 6^{3}

=== Top half ===
First round
1 | (Spain) D Gimeno-Traver | 7^{9} | 3 | 6
(France) R Jouan | 6^{7} | 6 | 4
Q | (France) N Renavand | 6 | 4 | 0
(Germany) P Torebko | 1 | 6 | 6
(France) G Burquier | 6 | 6
(Spain) G Granollers | 4 | 4
WC | (France) Laurent Rochette | 4 | 6 | 6
8 | (Australia) J Duckworth | 6 | 3 | 4
3 | (France) M Gicquel | 6 | 3 | 7
(Spain) I Navarro | 4 | 6 | 5
(Slovakia) K Čapkovič | 6 | 3 | 5
Q | (Poland) T Bednarek | 1 | 6 | 7
WC | (France) Charles-Antoine Brézac | 0 | 3
(Belgium) Y Mertens | 6 | 6
WC | (France) J Ouanna | 6 | 6
7 | (Germany) S Greul | 4 | 4

Second round
1 | (Spain) D Gimeno-Traver | 3 | 6 | 6
(Germany) P Torebko | 6 | 4 | 1
(France) G Burquier | 6 | 6
WC | (France) Laurent Rochette | 3 | 0
3 | (France) M Gicquel | 6 | 6
Q | (Poland) T Bednarek | 0 | 2
(Belgium) Y Mertens | 3 | 4
WC | (France) J Ouanna | 6 | 6

Quarterfinals
1 | (Spain) D Gimeno-Traver | 6^{5} | 4
(France) G Burquier | 7^{7} | 6
3 | (France) M Gicquel | 4 | 4
WC | (France) J Ouanna | 6 | 6

Semifinals
(France) G Burquier | 6^{4} | 6 | 3
WC | (France) J Ouanna | 7^{7} | 4 | 2^{r}

=== Bottom half ===
First round
5 | (France) K de Schepper | 6 | 3 | 3
(Germany) P Gojowczyk | 4 | 6 | 6
WC | (France) O Patience | 7 | 4 | 7^{7}
Alt | (France) Alexandre Penaud | 5 | 6 | 6^{3}
(Lithuania) L Grigelis | 4 | 4
(Italy) G Naso | 6 | 6
Q | (Spain) J Checa-Calvo | 6^{4} | 1
4 | (France) M Teixeira | 7^{7} | 6
6 | (France) A Gensse | 7^{7} | 4 | 7^{7}
Q | (Romania) V Crivoi | 6^{4} | 6 | 6^{4}
(France) V Millot | 6^{2} | 4
(Germany) D Meffert | 7 | 6
(Serbia) N Ćirić | 2 | 2
(France) J Dasnières de Veigy | 6 | 6
(France) M Rodrigues | 2 | 6 | 4
2 | (France) S Robert | 6 | 2 | 6

Second round
(Germany) P Gojowczyk | 4
WC | (France) O Patience | 1^{r}
(Italy) G Naso | 4 | 1
4 | (France) M Teixeira | 6 | 6
6 | (France) A Gensse | 6^{3} | 7 | 6
(Germany) D Meffert | 7^{7} | 5 | 1
(France) J Dasnières de Veigy | 6 | 6
2 | (France) S Robert | 2 | 4

Quarterfinals
(Germany) P Gojowczyk | 6 | 6
4 | (France) M Teixeira | 4 | 3
6 | (France) A Gensse | 6 | 6
(France) J Dasnières de Veigy | 3 | 4

Semifinals
(Germany) P Gojowczyk | 7 | 1 | 4
6 | (France) A Gensse | 5 | 6 | 6
