= 2012 Open Prévadiès Saint–Brieuc – Doubles =

Brieuc – Doubles
- 2012 Open Prévadiès Saint–Brieuc

Final
- Champions: (Lithuania) Laurynas Grigelis (Australia) Rameez Junaid
- Runners-up: (France) Stéphane Robert (France) Laurent Rochette
- Score: 1–6, 6–2, [10–6]

Events
Singles	Doubles
← 2011 ·	Open Prévadiès Saint–Brieuc	· 2013 →

Tomasz Bednarek and Andreas Siljeström were the defending champions but Siljeström decided not to participate.
Bednarek paired up with Olivier Charroin.
Laurynas Grigelis and Rameez Junaid won the title, defeating Stéphane Robert and Laurent Rochette 1–6, 6–2, [10–6] in the final.

== Seeds ==
The top seeded team received a bye into the quarterfinals.

1. (Poland) Tomasz Bednarek / (France) Olivier Charroin (quarterfinals)
2. (India) Purav Raja / (India) Divij Sharan (quarterfinals)
3. (Spain) Gerard Granollers / (Spain) Iván Navarro (first round)
4. (France) Stéphane Robert / (France) Laurent Rochette (final)

== Draw ==
=== Key ===
- Q = Qualifier
- WC = Wild card
- LL = Lucky loser
- Alt = Alternate
- SE = Special exempt
- PR = Protected ranking
- ITF = ITF entry
- JE = Junior exempt
- w/o = Walkover
- r = Retired
- d = Defaulted
- SR = Special ranking

=== Draw ===
First round
(Slovakia) K Čapkovič (Romania) V Crivoi	3	5
(France) G Burquier (France) R Jouan	6	7
4	(France) S Robert (France) Laurent Rochette	6	6
(France) Charles-Antoine Brézac (France) M Rodrigues	1	1
(Spain) J Checa-Calvo (Serbia) N Ćirić	4	3
WC	(France) K de Schepper (France) M Teixeira	6	6
(Lithuania) L Grigelis (Australia) R Junaid	6	7^{8}
(France) M Gicquel (France) J Ouanna	3	6^{6}
(France) Alexandre Penaud (Germany) P Torebko	6	6
3	(Spain) G Granollers (Spain) I Navarro	1	4
(Spain) Carlos Gómez-Ferre (Spain) Israel Sevilla	0	2
(France) O Patience (France) N Renavand	6	6
(France) A Gensse (France) V Millot	2	6^{6}
2	(India) P Raja (India) D Sharan	6	7^{8}

Quarterfinals
1	(Poland) T Bednarek (France) O Charroin	7	1	[5]
(France) G Burquier (France) R Jouan	5	6	[10]
4	(France) S Robert (France) L Rochette	7^{7}	6
WC	(France) K de Schepper (France) M Teixeira	6^{5}	4
(Lithuania) L Grigelis (Australia) R Junaid	6	6
(France) A Penaud (Germany) P Torebko	4	4
(France) O Patience (France) N Renavand	6	6
2	(India) P Raja (India) D Sharan	4	2

Semifinals
(France) G Burquier (France) R Jouan	2	4
4	(France) S Robert (France) L Rochette	6	6
(Lithuania) L Grigelis (Australia) R Junaid	6	7^{7}
(France) O Patience (France) N Renavand	2	6^{5}

Final
4	(France) S Robert (France) L Rochette	6	2	[6]
(Lithuania) L Grigelis (Australia) R Junaid	1	6	[10]
