= 2011 Open Prévadiès Saint–Brieuc – Singles =

Brieuc – Singles
- 2011 Open Prévadiès Saint–Brieuc

Final
- Champion: (France) Maxime Teixeira
- Runner-up: (France) Benoît Paire
- Score: 6–3, 6–0

Events
Singles	Doubles
← 2010 ·	Open Prévadiès Saint–Brieuc	· 2012 →

Michał Przysiężny chose to defend his last year's title, but Benoît Paire defeated him in the semifinals.
Maxime Teixeira won this tournament. He swept the title, defeating Paire in the final (6–3, 6–0).

== Seeds ==
1. (Argentina) Máximo González (semifinals)
2. (Poland) Michał Przysiężny (semifinals)
3. (France) Benoît Paire (final)
4. (Republic of Ireland) Conor Niland (first round)
5. (France) Vincent Millot (first round)
6. (France) Stéphane Robert (first round)
7. (Poland) Jerzy Janowicz (quarterfinals)
8. (France) David Guez (quarterfinals)

== Draw ==
=== Key ===
- Q = Qualifier
- WC = Wild card
- LL = Lucky loser
- Alt = Alternate
- ITF = ITF entry
- PR = Protected ranking
- SR = Special ranking
- SE = Special exempt
- JE = Junior exempt
- JR = Junior Accelerator Programme entrant
- CO = College Accelerator Programme entrant
- NG = Next Gen Accelerator Program entrant
- w/o = Walkover
- r = Retired
- d = Defaulted

=== Finals ===
Semifinals
1	(Argentina) Máximo González	6^{4}	3
(France) Maxime Teixeira	7	6
3	(France) Benoît Paire	6	6
2	(Poland) Michał Przysiężny	4	4

Final
(France) Maxime Teixeira	6	6
3	(France) Benoît Paire	3	0

=== Top half ===
First round
1	(Argentina) M González	7	3	6
(France) M Gicquel	6^{2}	6	4
Q	(Serbia) B Pašanski	7	5	6
(France) G Burquier	5	7	4
Q	(France) N Renavand	6	6
WC	(France) N Devilder	3	1
(France) A Gensse	6	6
5	(France) V Millot	4	1
4	(Republic of Ireland) C Niland	4	3
(Czech Republic) D Lojda	6	6
Q	(Romania) A Cruciat	5	0
(France) M Teixeira	7	6
(Australia) J Millman	2	6	2
(Germany) Alexander Flock	6	0	6
(Slovakia) P Červenák	6	6^{4}	1
8	(France) D Guez	4	7	6

Second round
1	(Argentina) M González	6	5	7
Q	(Serbia) B Pašanski	3	7	6^{7}
Q	(France) N Renavand	4	6^{5}
(France) A Gensse	6	7
(Czech Republic) D Lojda	4	3
(France) M Teixeira	6	6
(Germany) A Flock	3	2
8	(France) D Guez	6	6

Quarterfinals
1	(Argentina) M González	1	6	6
(France) A Gensse	6	4	1
(France) M Teixeira	3	6	6
8	(France) D Guez	6	3	2

Semifinals
1	(Argentina) M González	6^{4}	3
(France) M Teixeira	7	6

=== Bottom half ===
First round
6	(France) S Robert	3	6	3
PR	(Monaco) J-R Lisnard	6	3	6
(Portugal) J Sousa	3	0
(France) Laurent Rochette	6	6
(Ukraine) S Bubka	6	1	6
(France) R Jouan	4	6	3
WC	(France) L Walter	6^{4}	3
3	(France) B Paire	7	6
7	(Poland) J Janowicz	6	7
(Serbia) N Ćirić	4	5
WC	(France) M Rodrigues	7	4	6^{1}
(France) K de Schepper	6^{4}	6	7
Q	(France) Florent Diep	4	7	6
(France) Charles-Antoine Brézac	6	6^{4}	2
(Belgium) Y Mertens	3	2
2	(Poland) M Przysiężny	6	6

Second round
PR	(Monaco) J-R Lisnard	6^{9}	0
(France) L Rochette	7	6
(Ukraine) S Bubka	6	4	3
3	(France) B Paire	3	6	6
7	(Poland) J Janowicz	2	6	6
(France) K de Schepper	6	4	4
Q	(France) F Diep	6	2	5
2	(Poland) M Przysiężny	4	6	7

Quarterfinals
(France) L Rochette	6	2	4
3	(France) B Paire	2	6	6
7	(Poland) J Janowicz	7	2	6^{5}
2	(Poland) M Przysiężny	6^{1}	6	7

Semifinals
3	(France) B Paire	6	6
2	(Poland) M Przysiężny	4	4
