= Electoral history of Robert Borden =

List of elections featuring Robert Borden as a candidate

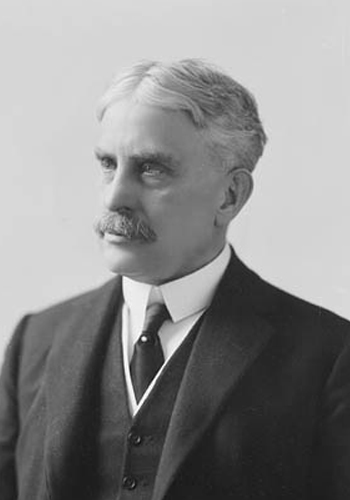
Prime Minister Borden

This article is the Electoral history of Robert Borden, the eighth Prime Minister of Canada (1911-1920).

A Conservative, he became Prime Minister after winning the federal election of 1911, defeating Sir Wilfrid Laurier. He won two general elections (1911, 1917) and lost two (1904, 1908). From 1911 to 1917, he led a Conservative government and from 1917 to 1920 led a Unionist coalition, formed over the issue of military conscription.

Borden was elected to the House of Commons of Canada eight times (1896, 1900, 1905, 1908 (twice), 1911 (twice), and 1917).

Borden retired in 1920 and was succeeded by Arthur Meighen.

== Summary ==
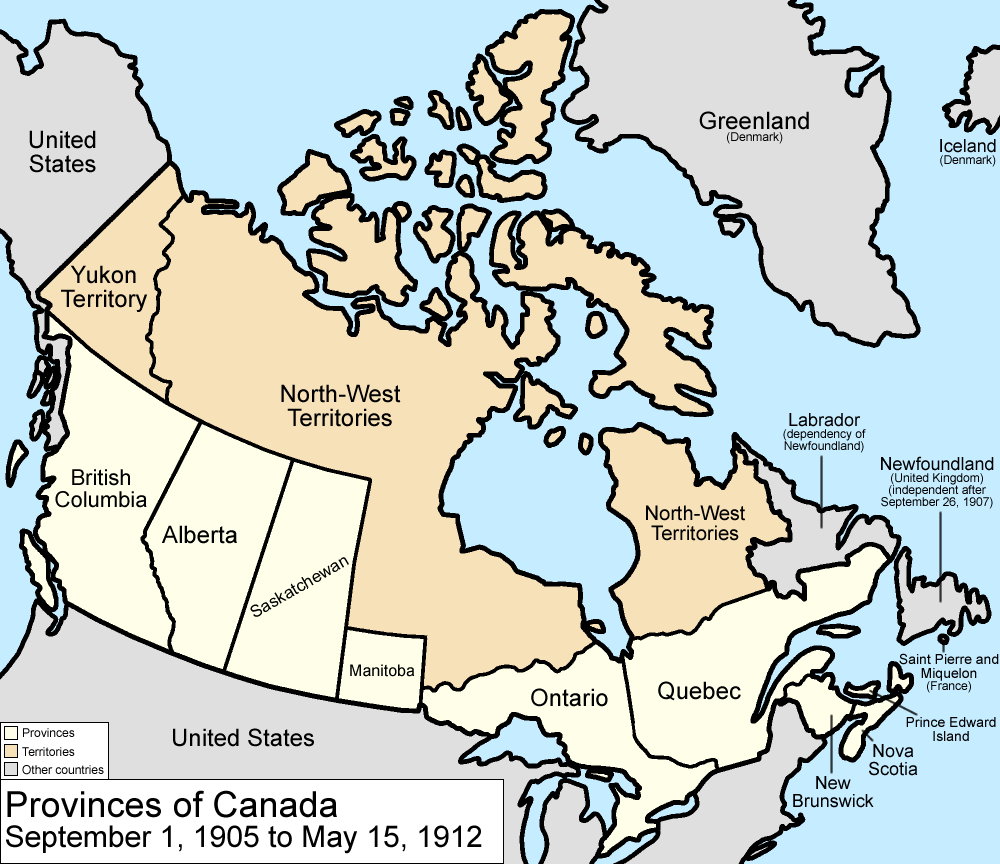
Canada in 1911, when Borden was elected Prime Minister.

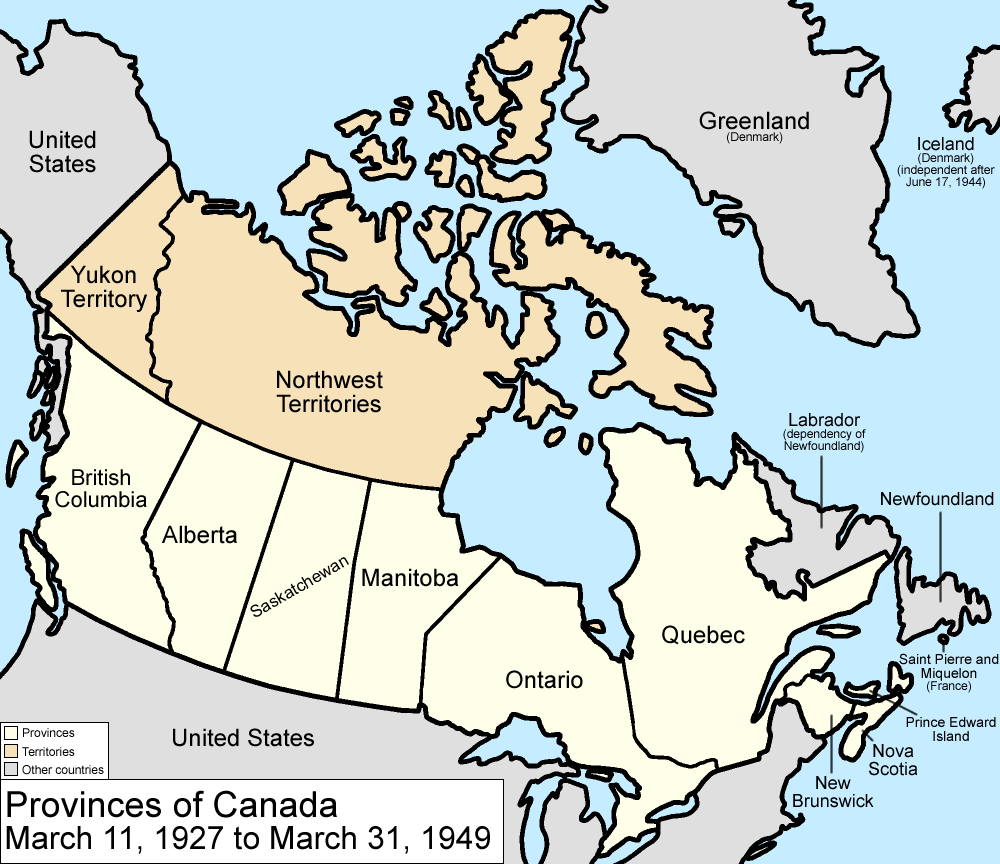
Canada at the end of Borden's time in office

Borden ranks eighth out of twenty-three prime ministers for time in office. He became Prime Minister in 1911, after defeating Sir Wilfrid Laurier and the Liberals, and was in office for a total of 8 years and 274 days. He served two consecutive terms, the first leading a Conservative government (1911 to 1917), the second leading a Unionist coalition government (1917 to 1920).

Borden was the third of three prime ministers from Nova Scotia, the other two being Sir John Sparrow David Thompson and Sir Charles Tupper.

Borden lost the first two general elections he contested, in 1904 and 1908, defeated in both cases by Laurier and the Liberals. He won the third general election, in 1911, while Laurier became the Leader of the Opposition.

Borden led Canada during World War I. One of the major political issues during the war was the conscription crisis of 1917. Borden formed a coalition with Liberals who supported his conscription policy and led the coalition as the Government (Unionist) Party. Those Liberals who opposed the conscription policy remained with the leadership of Laurier, and fought the election as the Opposition (Laurier Liberals) party.

Borden stood for election to the House of Commons of Canada nine times (1896, 1900, 1904, 1905 (by-election), 1908 (twice), 1911 (twice), and 1917), although two of those were multiple elections in the same general election, as was permitted at that time. He was elected eight times (twice by acclamation) and defeated once (1904). At various times, Borden was elected for three different constituencies in two different provinces: Halifax, Nova Scotia; Carleton, Ontario; and Kings, Nova Scotia. He served in the Commons for a total of 25 years, 1 month, and 25 days.

Borden retired in 1920, and was succeeded by Arthur Meighen.

== Federal general elections, 1904 to 1917 ==
Borden led the Conservative Party in three general elections, winning one (1911) and losing twice (1904, 1908). He also led the Unionist Party in his last general election (1917), which he won.

=== Federal election, 1904 ===
Borden led the Conservatives in the 1904 general election. He had replaced Sir Charles Tupper as leader of the Conservatives and Leader of the Opposition in 1901. His opponent in the general election was Prime Minister Sir Wilfrid Laurier, leader of the Liberal Party of Canada. Laurier and the Liberals again won a majority government and Borden continued as Leader of the Opposition.

Canadian Federal Election, 1904 - Parties, Leaders, Seats Won and Popular Vote
Party	Leaders	Seats Won	Popular Vote
Liberal	Wilfrid Laurier^{1}	137	50.9%
Conservative	Robert Laird Borden^{2}	70	44.4%
Liberal-Conservative	Robert Laird Borden^{2}	5	1.5%
Independent	–	1	1.5%
Independent Conservative	–	1	0.5%
Labour	–	0	0.2%
Socialist	–	0	0.2%
Nationalist	–	0	0.1%
Independent Liberal	–	0	0.0%^{3}
Unknown^{4}	–	0	1.1%
Total		214	100.4%^{5}
Source: Library of Parliament – History of Federal Ridings since 1867

^{1} Prime Minister when election was called; Prime Minister after the election.
^{2} Leader of the Opposition when election was called; Leader of the Opposition after the election.
^{3} Independent Liberal candidates received only 309 votes nationally.
^{4} Election returns in 1904 did not require candidates to declare party affiliation. Some candidates did not list a party affiliation.
^{5} Rounding error.

=== Federal election, 1908 ===
Borden again led the Conservatives in the 1908 general election. His opponent was again Prime Minister Laurier, the leader of the Liberals. Laurier again won a majority government and Borden continued as Leader of the Opposition.

Canadian Federal Election, 1908 - Parties, Leaders, Seats Won and Popular Vote
Party	Leaders	Seats Won	Popular Vote
Liberal	Wilfrid Laurier^{1}	133	48.9%
Conservative	Robert Laird Borden^{2}	82	45.0%
Liberal-Conservative	Robert Laird Borden^{2}	3	1.3%
Independent	–	1	1.5%
Labour	–	1	0.9%
Independent Conservative	–	1	0.5%
Socialist	–	0	0.5%
Independent Liberal	–	0	0.4
Unknown^{3}	–	0	1.2%
Total		213	100.2%^{4}
Source: Library of Parliament – History of Federal Ridings since 1867

^{1} Prime Minister when election was called; Prime Minister after the election.
^{2} Leader of the Opposition when election was called; Leader of the Opposition after the election.
^{3} Election returns in 1908 did not require candidates to declare party affiliation. Some candidates did not list a party affiliation.
^{4} Rounding error.

=== Federal election, 1911 ===
Borden again led the Conservatives in the 1911 general election, which was fought on the issue of reciprocity (lowered trade barriers) with the United States. Naval policy was also an issue. Borden and the Conservatives won a majority government, defeating Laurier and the Liberals. Borden became Prime Minister and Laurier became Leader of the Official Opposition.

Canadian Federal Election, 1911 - Parties, Leaders, Seats Won and Popular Vote
Party	Leaders	Seats Won	Popular Vote
Conservative	Robert Laird Borden^{1}	131	48.0%
Liberal-Conservative	Robert Laird Borden^{1}	1	0.5%
Liberal	Wilfrid Laurier^{2}	85	45.8%
Independent Conservative	–	3	1.0%
Labour	–	1	0.9%
Independent	–	0	0.8%
Socialist	–	0	0.4%
Nationalist Conservative	–	0	0.3%
Nationalist	–	0	0.3%
Unknown^{3}	–	0	2.0%
Total		221	100.0%
Source: Library of Parliament – History of Federal Ridings since 1867

^{1} Leader of the Opposition when election was called; Prime Minister after the election.
^{2} Prime Minister when election was called; Leader of the Opposition after the election.
^{3} Election returns in 1911 did not require candidates to declare party affiliation. Some candidates did not list a party affiliation.

=== Federal election, 1917 ===
The 1917 election was Borden's last election. The election was fought entirely on the issue of conscription and Canada's role in World War I. Borden led a coalition of Conservatives and Liberals who supported the Borden government's conscription policy. Laurier was again his opponent, leading those Liberals who opposed the conscription policy. The election and the conscription crisis badly divided the country between English-Canadians, who tended to support conscription, and French-Canadians, who opposed it. Borden was re-elected and formed the Unionist (coalition) government.

Canadian Federal Election, 1917 - Parties, Leaders, Seats Won and Popular Vote
Party	Leaders	Seats Won	Popular Vote
Government (Unionist)	Robert Laird Borden^{1}	153	56.9%
Opposition (Laurier Liberals)	Wilfrid Laurier^{2}	82	38.8%
Labour	–	0	1.8%
Opposition - Labour	–	0	1.0%
Independent	–	0	0.6%
Independent Liberal	–	0	0.4%
Nonpartisan League	–	0	0.2%
Unknown^{3}	–	0	0.2%
Total		235	99.9%^{4}
Source: Library of Parliament – History of Federal Ridings since 1867

^{1} Prime Minister when election was called; Prime Minister after the election.
^{2} Leader of the Opposition when election was called; Leader of the Opposition after the election.
^{3} Election returns in 1917 did not require candidates to declare party affiliation. Some candidates did not list a party affiliation.
^{4} Rounding error.

== Federal constituency elections, 1896 to 1917 ==
Borden stood for election to the House of Commons nine times, in two different provinces (Nova Scotia and Ontario), in three different ridings. He was elected eight times and defeated once.

=== 1896 Federal election: Halifax ===
1896 Canadian federal election: Halifax
Party	Candidate	Votes	%	Elected
Conservative	Robert Borden	6,170	26.53	✓
Liberal	Benjamin Russell	5,997	25.79	✓
Conservative	Thomas Edward Kenny	5,616	24.15	
Liberal	Michael Edwin Keefe	5,472	23.53	
Total valid votes		23,255	100.00	
Source(s) "Halifax (1867- )". History of Federal Ridings Since 1867. Library of Parliament. Two members were elected from the district.

=== 1900 Federal election: Halifax ===
1900 Canadian federal election: Halifax
Party	Candidate	Votes	%	±%	Elected
Conservative	Robert Borden	5,705	25.67	-0.86	✓
Liberal	William Roche	5,577	25.09		✓
Conservative	Thomas Edward Kenny	5,562	25.03	+0.88	
Liberal	William B. Wallace	5,380	24.21		
Total valid votes		22,224	100.00		
Conservative hold		Swing		+0.02	
Liberal hold		Swing		-0.02	
Source(s) "Halifax (1867- )". History of Federal Ridings Since 1867. Library of Parliament. Two members were elected from the district.

=== 1904 Federal election: Halifax ===
1904 Canadian federal election: Halifax
Party	Candidate	Votes	%	±%	Elected
Liberal	William Roche	7,430	26.53	+1.43	✓
Liberal	Michael Carney	7,277	25.98		✓
Conservative	Robert Borden	6,830	24.39	-1.29	
Conservative	John C. O'Mullin	6,472	23.11		
Total valid votes		28,009	99.50		
Total rejected, unmarked and declined ballots		141	0.50		
Turnout			≥73.04		
Eligible voters		19,035			
Liberal hold		Swing		+3.21	
Liberal gain from Conservative		Swing		–	
Source(s) Source: Sayers, Anthony (2017). "1904 Federal Election". Canadian Elections Database. Two members were elected from the district.

=== 1905 Federal by-election: Carleton ===
On Mr. Kidd's resignation, January 1, 1905, to provide a seat for Robert Laird Borden.

Canadian federal by-election, February 4, 1905: Carleton On the resignation of Edward Kidd, January 19, 1905
Party	Candidate	Votes	Elected
Conservative	Robert Borden	acclaimed	✓
Total valid votes		–	–
Source(s) "Carleton, Ontario (1867-08-06 - 1968-04-22)". History of Federal Ridings Since 1867. Library of Parliament.

=== 1908 Federal election: Halifax ===
In the 1908 general election, Borden stood in two constituencies as was permitted at that time: Halifax, Nova Scotia and Carleton, Ontario. He was elected in both ridings but chose to sit for Halifax, and resigned the Carleton seat.

1908 Canadian federal election: Halifax
Party	Candidate	Votes	%	±%	Elected
Conservative	Robert Borden	7,386	26.80	+2.42	✓
Conservative	Adam Brown Crosby	7,115	25.82		✓
Liberal	William Roche	6,635	24.08	-1.91	
Liberal	Michael Carney	6,423	23.31	-3.22	
Total valid votes		27,559	98.47		
Total rejected, unmarked and declined ballots		428	1.53	+1.03	
Turnout			≥71.14	-2.80	
Eligible voters		19,670			
Conservative notional gain from Liberal		Swing		+5.13	
Source(s) Source: Sayers, Anthony (2017). "1908 Federal Election". Canadian Elections Database. Two members were elected from the district.

=== 1908 Federal election: Carleton ===
In the 1908 general election, Borden stood in two constituencies as was permitted at that time: Carleton, Ontario and Halifax, Nova Scotia. He was elected in both ridings but chose to sit for Halifax, and resigned the Carleton seat.

1908 Canadian federal election: Carleton, Ontario
Party	Candidate	Votes	%	±%	Elected
Conservative	Robert Borden	2,667	67.28	+3.72	✓
Liberal	James Ernest Caldwell	1,297	32.72	–3.72	
Total valid votes		3,964	100.0		
Conservative hold		Swing		+3.72	
Source(s) "Carleton, Ontario (1867-08-06 - 1968-04-22)". History of Federal Ridings Since 1867. Library of Parliament.

=== 1911 Federal election: Halifax ===
1911 Canadian federal election: Halifax
Party	Candidate	Votes	%	±%	Elected
Conservative	Robert Borden	7,040	25.46	-1.34	✓
Liberal	Alexander Kenneth Maclean	6,946	25.12		✓
Liberal	Edward Blackadder	6,879	24.88		
Conservative	Adam Brown Crosby	6,787	24.54	-1.27	
Total valid votes		27,652	100.00		
Conservative hold		Swing		-2.61	
Liberal gain from Conservative		Swing		–	
Source(s) "Halifax (1867- )". History of Federal Ridings Since 1867. Library of Parliament. Two members were elected from the district.

=== 1911 Federal Ministerial By-Election: Halifax ===
At this time, newly appointed Cabinet ministers had to stand for re-election. It was customary for the other party not to field a candidate.

Canadian federal by-election, October 27, 1911: Halifax Called upon the appointment of Robert Borden's as President of the King's Privy Council for Canada and his becoming Prime Minister of Canada, 10 October 1911.
Party	Candidate	Votes	Elected
Conservative	Robert Borden	acclaimed	✓
Total valid votes		–	–
Source(s) "Halifax (1867- )". History of Federal Ridings Since 1867. Library of Parliament.

=== 1917 Federal election: Kings ===
1917 Canadian federal election: Kings
Party	Candidate	Votes	%	Elected
Government (Unionist)	Robert Borden	3,941	60.96	✓
Opposition (Laurier Liberals)	James Sealy	2,524	39.04	
Total valid votes		6,465	100.0	
Source(s) "Kings, Nova Scotia (1867-08-06 - 1925-09-04)". History of Federal Ridings Since 1867. Library of Parliament.

== See also ==
- Electoral history of Wilfrid Laurier – Borden's predecessor as prime minister and principal opponent in four general elections.
- Electoral history of Charles Tupper – Borden's predecessor as leader of the Conservative Party.
- Electoral history of Arthur Meighen – Borden's successor as leader of the Conservative Party and as prime minister.
