= 2011 Open Prévadiès Saint–Brieuc – Doubles =

Brieuc – Doubles
- 2011 Open Prévadiès Saint–Brieuc

Final
- Champions: (Poland) Tomasz Bednarek (Sweden) Andreas Siljeström
- Runners-up: (France) Grégoire Burquier (France) Romain Jouan
- Score: 6–4, 6–7(4), [14–12]

Events
Singles	Doubles
← 2010 ·	Open Prévadiès Saint–Brieuc	· 2012 →

Uladzimir Ignatik and David Marrero were the defending champions but decided not to participate.
Third seeds Tomasz Bednarek and Andreas Siljeström defeated Grégoire Burquier and Romain Jouan 6–4, 6–7(4), [14–12] in the final.

== Seeds ==
1. (United States) James Cerretani / (Canada) Adil Shamasdin (first round)
2. (Australia) Rameez Junaid / (Germany) Philipp Marx (first round)
3. (Poland) Tomasz Bednarek / (Sweden) Andreas Siljeström (champions)
4. (France) Olivier Charroin / (India) Purav Raja (semifinals)

== Draw ==
=== Key ===
- Q = Qualifier
- WC = Wild card
- LL = Lucky loser
- Alt = Alternate
- SE = Special exempt
- PR = Protected ranking
- ITF = ITF entry
- JE = Junior exempt
- w/o = Walkover
- r = Retired
- d = Defaulted
- SR = Special ranking

=== Draw ===
First round
1	(United States) J Cerretani (Canada) A Shamasdin	6	4	[8]
(France) S Robert (France) Laurent Rochette	2	6	[10]
WC	(France) M Rodrigues (France) L Walter	7	2	[7]
(France) Charles-Antoine Brézac (France) Vincent Stouff	6^{1}	6	[10]
3	(Poland) T Bednarek (Sweden) A Siljeström	7	6
(Poland) J Janowicz (Poland) M Przysiężny	5	4
(France) A Gensse (France) V Millot	6	6
WC	(Argentina) M González (France) Quentin Lesne	1	1
(Switzerland) Y Allegro (France) M Gicquel	6	6
(Spain) G Granollers-Pujol (Portugal) J Sousa	4	4
(Ukraine) Sergei Bubka (Slovakia) P Červenák	3	6^{5}
4	(France) O Charroin (India) P Raja	6	7
(Australia) J Kerr (Serbia) D Vemić	6	4	[8]
(France) D Guez (France) N Renavand	3	6	[10]
WC	(France) G Burquier (France) R Jouan	2	6	[10]
2	(Australia) R Junaid (Germany) P Marx	6	1	[4]

Quarterfinals
(France) S Robert (France) Laurent Rochette	7	4	[10]
(France) Charles-Antoine Brézac (France) Vincent Stouff	6^{5}	6	[4]
3	(Poland) T Bednarek (Sweden) A Siljeström	6	6
(France) A Gensse (France) V Millot	1	3
(Switzerland) Y Allegro (France) M Gicquel	2	7	[6]
4	(France) O Charroin (India) P Raja	6	6^{8}	[10]
(France) D Guez (France) N Renavand	6^{9}	4
WC	(France) G Burquier (France) R Jouan	7	6

Semifinals
(France) S Robert (France) Laurent Rochette	3	0
3	(Poland) T Bednarek (Sweden) A Siljeström	6	6
4	(France) O Charroin (India) P Raja	4	4
WC	(France) G Burquier (France) R Jouan	6	6

Final
3	(Poland) T Bednarek (Sweden) A Siljeström	6	6^{4}	[14]
(France) G Burquier (France) R Jouan	4	7	[12]
