= 2012 Open BNP Paribas Banque de Bretagne – Singles =

Singles
- 2012 Open BNP Paribas Banque de Bretagne

Final
- Champion: (Netherlands) Igor Sijsling
- Runner-up: (Tunisia) Malek Jaziri
- Score: 6–3, 6–4

Events
Singles	Doubles
- Open BNP Paribas Banque de Bretagne

David Guez was the defending champion, but lost in the first round to first seeded Édouard Roger-Vasselin.
Igor Sijsling won the final 6–3, 6–4 against Malek Jaziri.

== Seeds ==
1. (France) Édouard Roger-Vasselin (quarterfinals)
2. (South Africa) Rik de Voest (first round)
3. (Tunisia) Malek Jaziri (final)
4. (Germany) Daniel Brands (quarterfinals)
5. (Germany) Björn Phau (second round)
6. (Spain) Arnau Brugués-Davi (first round)
7. (France) Florent Serra (quarterfinals)
8. (Spain) Pablo Carreño-Busta (first round)

== Draw ==
Key

- Q = Qualifier
- WC = Wild card
- LL = Lucky loser
- Alt = Alternate
- ITF = ITF entry
- PR = Protected ranking
- SR = Special ranking
- SE = Special exempt
- JE = Junior exempt
- JR = Junior Accelerator Programme entrant
- CO = College Accelerator Programme entrant
- NG = Next Gen Accelerator Program entrant
- w/o = Walkover
- r = Retired
- d = Defaulted

=== Finals ===
Semifinals
(Netherlands) Igor Sijsling	6	6
(Spain) Roberto Bautista-Agut	2	2
3	(Tunisia) Malek Jaziri	7^{12}	6
(Russia) Evgeny Donskoy	6^{10}	4

Final
(Netherlands) Igor Sijsling	6	6
3	(Tunisia) Malek Jaziri	3	4

=== Top half ===
First round
1	(France) É Roger-Vasselin	6	6
(France) D Guez	1	2
Q	(Switzerland) Adrien Bossel	4	3
(France) M Teixeira	6	6
LL	(France) Elie Rousset	2	5
(Netherlands) I Sijsling	6	7
(Germany) B Knittel	1	4
5	(Germany) B Phau	6	6
4	(Germany) D Brands	7^{7}	6
WC	(France) J Dasnières de Veigy	6^{4}	4
Q	(France) O Patience	4	6^{1}
Q	(France) Laurent Rochette	6	7^{7}
(Spain) R Bautista-Agut	2	6	6
(Belgium) D Goffin	6	3	4
(Portugal) J Sousa	2	6	6
6	(Spain) A Brugués-Davi	6	2	3

Second round
1	(France) É Roger-Vasselin	6	6
(France) M Teixeira	4	2
(Netherlands) I Sijsling	7^{7}	6
5	(Germany) B Phau	6^{4}	3
4	(Germany) D Brands	3	7^{7}	6
Q	(France) L Rochette	6	6^{2}	4
(Spain) R Bautista-Agut	7	6
(Portugal) J Sousa	5	2

Quarterfinals
1	(France) É Roger-Vasselin	6^{6}	3
(Netherlands) I Sijsling	7^{8}	6
4	(Germany) D Brands	5	6	5
(Spain) R Bautista-Agut	7	4	7

Semifinals
(Netherlands) I Sijsling	6	6
(Spain) R Bautista-Agut	2	2

=== Bottom half ===
First round
7	(France) F Serra	6	7^{9}
(France) K de Schepper	4	6^{7}
(Czech Republic) I Minář	7^{7}	6
Q	(France) P-H Hugues	6^{1}	3
WC	(France) R Jouan	6^{3}	7^{7}	2
(France) A Gensse	7^{7}	6^{3}	6
WC	(France) G Rufin	4	4
3	(Tunisia) M Jaziri	6	6
8	(Spain) P Carreño-Busta	1	4
(France) A Clément	6	6
WC	(France) P-H Mathieu	6	3	2
(Russia) E Donskoy	3	6	6
(France) M Gicquel	6	2	6
(Germany) D Meffert	3	6	3
(Germany) D Brown	6	0	6
2	(South Africa) R de Voest	4	6	4

Second round
7	(France) F Serra	7^{8}	6
(Czech Republic) I Minář	6^{6}	4
(France) A Gensse	6^{5}	1
3	(Tunisia) M Jaziri	7^{7}	6
(France) A Clément	6	3	6^{4}
(Russia) E Donskoy	3	6	7^{7}
(France) M Gicquel	6	6
(Germany) D Brown	4	3

Quarterfinals
7	(France) F Serra	1	3
3	(Tunisia) M Jaziri	6	6
(Russia) E Donskoy	7^{7}	6^{4}	6
(France) M Gicquel	6^{4}	7^{7}	3

Semifinals
3	(Tunisia) M Jaziri	7^{12}	6
(Russia) E Donskoy	6^{10}	4
