= 2014 BNP Paribas Primrose Bordeaux – Singles =

Singles
- 2014 BNP Paribas Primrose Bordeaux

Final
- Champion: (France) Julien Benneteau
- Runner-up: (United States) Steve Johnson
- Score: 6–3, 6–2

Events
Singles	Doubles
← 2013 ·	BNP Paribas Primrose Bordeaux	· 2015 →

Gaël Monfils was the defending champion but decided not to compete.

Julien Benneteau won the title, defeating Steve Johnson in the final, 6–3, 6–2.

== Seeds ==
1. (France) Julien Benneteau (champion)
2. (United States) Steve Johnson (final)
3. (France) Kenny de Schepper (semifinals)
4. (France) Paul-Henri Mathieu (withdrew)
5. (Ukraine) Sergiy Stakhovsky (first round)
6. (Belgium) David Goffin (quarterfinals)
7. (Czech Republic) Jiří Veselý (quarterfinals)
8. (Tunisia) Malek Jaziri (quarterfinals)

== Draw ==
=== Key ===
- Q = Qualifier
- WC = Wild card
- LL = Lucky loser
- Alt = Alternate
- ITF = ITF entry
- PR = Protected ranking
- SR = Special ranking
- SE = Special exempt
- JE = Junior exempt
- JR = Junior Accelerator Programme entrant
- CO = College Accelerator Programme entrant
- NG = Next Gen Accelerator Program entrant
- w/o = Walkover
- r = Retired
- d = Defaulted

=== Finals ===
Semifinals
1/WC	(France) Julien Benneteau	6	3	6
3	(France) Kenny de Schepper	4	6	3
LL	(Argentina) Juan Ignacio Londero	3	4
2	(United States) Steve Johnson	6	6

Final
1/WC	(France) Julien Benneteau	6	6
2	(United States) Steve Johnson	3	2

=== Top half ===
First round
1/WC	(France) J Benneteau	7	6
(United States) D Kudla	5	2
(France) M Gicquel	6^{5}	3
SE	(Spain) R Ramírez Hidalgo	7^{7}	6
(Canada) P Polansky	6	6
(Croatia) A Pavić	3	3
WC	(France) M Teixeira	4	1
7	(Czech Republic) J Veselý	6	6
3	(France) K de Schepper	7^{7}	3	7^{7}
(Brazil) J Souza	6^{2}	6	6^{4}
(Argentina) M González	4	2
Q	(Argentina) M Alund	6	6
(France) A Olivetti	4	6	6
WC	(France) J Eysseric	6	3	4
(Argentina) G Pella	0	6^{5}
8	(Tunisia) M Jaziri	6	7^{7}

Second round
1/WC	(France) J Benneteau	6	6
SE	(Spain) R Ramírez Hidalgo	2	4
(Canada) P Polansky	5	5
7	(Czech Republic) J Veselý	7	7
3	(France) K de Schepper	7^{7}	6
Q	(Argentina) M Alund	6^{5}	4
(France) A Olivetti	4	6	3
8	(Tunisia) M Jaziri	6	1	6

Quarterfinals
1/WC	(France) J Benneteau	6^{4}	7	6
7	(Czech Republic) J Veselý	7^{7}	5	3
3	(France) K de Schepper	6	6
8	(Tunisia) M Jaziri	1	2

Semifinals
1/WC	(France) J Benneteau	6	3	6
3	(France) K de Schepper	4	6	3

=== Bottom half ===
First round
5	(Ukraine) S Stakhovsky	3	3
(United States) A Kuznetsov	6	6
(France) D Guez	7^{7}	7
(France) M Llodra	6^{3}	5
LL	(Argentina) JI Londero	6	2	6
(United States) R Harrison	3	6	4
Q	(France) J Ouanna	7	6^{2}	5
LL	(France) L Lokoli	5	7^{7}	7
6	(Belgium) D Goffin	6	6
(Argentina) H Zeballos	3	1
(Romania) A Ungur	6	3	6
SE	(Switzerland) Y Marti	3	6	4
Q	(Argentina) A Collarini	6	7
WC	(France) F Serra	4	5
(Argentina) DS Schwartzman	3	6^{2}
2	(United States) S Johnson	6	7^{7}

Second round
(United States) A Kuznetsov	4	6	3
(France) D Guez	6	2	6
LL	(Argentina) JI Londero	6^{6}	6	6
LL	(France) L Lokoli	7^{8}	3	3
6	(Belgium) D Goffin	6	6
(Romania) A Ungur	0	1
Q	(Argentina) A Collarini	5	2
2	(United States) S Johnson	7	6

Quarterfinals
(France) D Guez	4	0
LL	(Argentina) JI Londero	6	6
6	(Belgium) D Goffin	4	3
2	(United States) S Johnson	6	6

Semifinals
LL	(Argentina) JI Londero	3	4
2	(United States) S Johnson	6	6
