= 2011 Open EuroEnergie de Quimper – Singles =

Singles
- 2011 Open EuroEnergie de Quimper

Final
- Champion: (France) David Guez
- Runner-up: (France) Kenny de Schepper
- Score: 6–2, 4–6, 7–6^{(7–5)}

Events
Singles	Doubles
- Open EuroEnergie de Quimper

This is the first edition of this tournament. David Guez won the title, defeating Kenny de Schepper 6–2, 4–6, 7–6^{(7–5)} in the final.

== Seeds ==
1. (France) Nicolas Mahut (first round)
2. (Republic of Ireland) Conor Niland (first round)
3. (France) Vincent Millot (quarterfinals)
4. (France) Josselin Ouanna (first round)
5. (Spain) Roberto Bautista-Agut (semifinals)
6. (France) Augustin Gensse (second round)
7. (France) Olivier Patience (semifinals)
8. (France) David Guez (champion)

== Draw ==
Key

- Q = Qualifier
- WC = Wild card
- LL = Lucky loser
- Alt = Alternate
- ITF = ITF entry
- PR = Protected ranking
- SR = Special ranking
- SE = Special exempt
- JE = Junior exempt
- JR = Junior Accelerator Programme entrant
- CO = College Accelerator Programme entrant
- NG = Next Gen Accelerator Program entrant
- w/o = Walkover
- r = Retired
- d = Defaulted

=== Finals ===
Semifinals
Q	(France) Kenny de Schepper	6	5	7^{7}
5	(Spain) Roberto Bautista-Agut	3	7	6^{5}
7	(France) Olivier Patience	4	6	0
8	(France) David Guez	6	4	6

Final
Q	(France) Kenny de Schepper	2	6	6^{5}
8	(France) David Guez	6	4	7^{7}

=== Top half ===
First round
1/WC	(France) N Mahut	5	4
WC	(France) L Walter	7	6
Alt	(Italy) Andrea Arnaboldi	6^{8}	7^{7}	4
Q	(France) K de Schepper	7^{10}	6^{4}	6
Q	(France) N Renavand	6^{5}	4
Q	(France) M Rodrigues	7^{7}	6
Q	(France) M Teixeira	6^{4}	4
6	(France) A Gensse	7^{7}	6
4	(France) J Ouanna	3	3
(France) Laurent Rochette	6	6
Alt	(France) Florian Reynet	3	7	4
(Israel) A Weintraub	6	5	6
(France) Grégoire Burquier	4	7	6
(Spain) A Menéndez	6	5	3
(Portugal) J Sousa	2	2
5	(Spain) R Bautista-Agut	6	6

Second round
WC	(France) L Walter	6^{5}	2
Q	(France) K de Schepper	7^{7}	6
Q	(France) M Rodrigues	7^{7}	6
6	(France) A Gensse	6^{5}	3
(France) Laurent Rochette	6^{3}	7	6
(Israel) A Weintraub	7^{7}	5	2
(France) Grégoire Burquier	3	4
5	(Spain) R Bautista-Agut	6	6

Quarterfinals
Q	(France) K de Schepper	6	7^{7}
Q	(France) M Rodrigues	3	6^{4}
(France) Laurent Rochette	4	6^{2}
5	(Spain) R Bautista-Agut	6	7^{7}

Semifinals
Q	(France) K de Schepper	6	5	7^{7}
5	(Spain) R Bautista-Agut	3	7	6^{5}

=== Bottom half ===
First round
7	(France) O Patience	6	4	7^{7}
(United States) K Kim	4	6	6^{0}
(Italy) M Trevisan	2	5
(France) Clément Reix	6	7
(France) R Jouan	7^{8}	6^{5}	6
(France) Charles-Antoine Brézac	6^{6}	7^{7}	3
(Belgium) Y Mertens	4	3
3	(France) V Millot	6	6
8	(France) D Guez	6	6
WC	(France) J Eysseric	2	3
WC	(France) P-H Herbert	7	6
(Finland) H Kontinen	5;	4
(Croatia) N Mektić	3	6^{1}
(France) M Gicquel	6	7^{7}
(Germany) S Rieschick	6	6
2	(Republic of Ireland) C Niland	4	3

Second round
7	(France) O Patience	7	6
(France) Clément Reix	5	1
(France) R Jouan	5	4
3	(France) V Millot	7	6
8	(France) D Guez	6	4	6
WC	(France) P-H Herbert	4	6	3
(France) M Gicquel	6	6
(Germany) S Rieschick	4	4

Quarterfinals
7	(France) O Patience	6	6^{10}	6
3	(France) V Millot	3	7^{12}	3
8	(France) D Guez	6	6
(France) M Gicquel	4	3

Semifinals
7	(France) O Patience	4	6	0
8	(France) D Guez	6	4	6
