= 2011 Open EuroEnergie de Quimper =

- Date: 7–13 February
- Edition: 1st
- Location: Quimper, France

Champions

Singles
- (France) David Guez

Doubles
- (United States) James Cerretani / (Canada) Adil Shamasdin
Open BNP Paribas Banque de Bretagne	· 2012 →

The 2011 Open EuroEnergie de Quimper was a professional tennis tournament played on indoor hard courts. It was part of the 2011 ATP Challenger Tour. It took place in Quimper, France between 7 and 13 February 2011.

== ATP entrants ==
=== Seeds ===
Country	Player	Rank	Seed
FRA	Nicolas Mahut	118	1
IRL	Conor Niland	131	2
FRA	Vincent Millot	149	3
FRA	Josselin Ouanna	167	4
ESP	Roberto Bautista-Agut	180	5
FRA	Augustin Gensse	189	6
FRA	Olivier Patience	196	7
FRA	David Guez	197	8

- Rankings are as of January 31, 2011.

=== Other entrants ===
The following players received wildcards into the singles main draw:

- (France) Charles-Antoine Brézac
- (France) Jonathan Eysseric
- (France) Nicolas Mahut
- (France) Ludovic Walter

The following players received entry from the qualifying draw:

- (France) Kenny de Schepper
- (France) Nicolas Renavand
- (France) Mathieu Rodrigues
- (France) Maxime Teixeira

== Champions ==
=== Singles ===
(France) David Guez def. (France) Kenny de Schepper, 6–2, 4–6, 7–6^{(7–5)}

=== Doubles ===
(United States) James Cerretani / (Canada) Adil Shamasdin def. (United Kingdom) Jamie Delgado / (United Kingdom) Jonathan Marray, 6–3, 5–7, [10–5]
