= 2014 BNP Paribas Primrose Bordeaux – Doubles =

Doubles
- 2014 BNP Paribas Primrose Bordeaux

Final
- Champion: (France) Marc Gicquel (Ukraine) Sergiy Stakhovsky
- Runner-up: (United States) Ryan Harrison (United States) Alex Kuznetsov
- Score: walkover

Events
Singles	Doubles
← 2013 ·	BNP Paribas Primrose Bordeaux	· 2015 →

Christopher Kas and Oliver Marach were the defending champion, but decided not to compete.

Marc Gicquel and Sergiy Stakhovsky won the title when Ryan Harrison and Alex Kuznetsov withdrew.

== Seeds ==
1. (Croatia) Marin Draganja / (Romania) Florin Mergea (quarterfinals)
2. (United Kingdom) Ken Skupski / (United Kingdom) Neal Skupski (first round)
3. (Germany) Dominik Meffert / (Austria) Philipp Oswald (quarterfinals)
4. (Poland) Mateusz Kowalczyk / (Sweden) Andreas Siljeström (first round)

== Draw ==
=== Key ===
- Q = Qualifier
- WC = Wild card
- LL = Lucky loser
- Alt = Alternate
- SE = Special exempt
- PR = Protected ranking
- ITF = ITF entry
- JE = Junior exempt
- w/o = Walkover
- r = Retired
- d = Defaulted
- SR = Special ranking

=== Draw ===
First round
1	(Croatia) M Draganja (Romania) F Mergea	6	6
(France) K de Schepper (France) A Olivetti	4	4
(Argentina) G Pella (Argentina) DS Schwartzman	7	6
WC	(France) F Serra (France) M Teixeira	5	3
3	(Germany) D Meffert (Austria) P Oswald	6	7
(United States) S Johnson (Croatia) A Pavić	3	5
(France) M Gicquel (Ukraine) S Stakhovsky	6	6
(Brazil) J Souza (Argentina) H Zeballos	4	4
(Argentina) G Durán (Argentina) M González	1	6	[10]
WC	(France) J Eysseric (France) R Jouan	6	4	[6]
(United States) R Harrison (United States) A Kuznetsov	6	7^{7}
4	(Poland) M Kowalczyk (Sweden) A Siljeström	3	6^{4}
(United States) D Kudla (Canada) P Polansky	4	2
(Tunisia) M Jaziri (Romania) A Ungur	6	6
WC	(France) E Couacaud (France) L Lokoli	7^{7}	3	[10]
2	(United Kingdom) K Skupski (United Kingdom) N Skupski	6^{4}	6	[5]

Quarterfinals
1	(Croatia) M Draganja (Romania) F Mergea	4	3
(Argentina) G Pella (Argentina) DS Schwartzman	6	6
3	(Germany) D Meffert (Austria) P Oswald	4	3
(France) M Gicquel (Ukraine) S Stakhovsky	6	6
(Argentina) G Durán (Argentina) M González	6	1	[3]
(United States) R Harrison (United States) A Kuznetsov	2	6	[10]
(Tunisia) M Jaziri (Romania) A Ungur	4	0
WC	(France) E Couacaud (France) L Lokoli	6	6

Semifinals
(Argentina) G Pella (Argentina) DS Schwartzman	4	6	[11]
(France) M Gicquel (Ukraine) S Stakhovsky	6	3	[13]
(United States) R Harrison (United States) A Kuznetsov	6	7^{7}
WC	(France) E Couacaud (France) L Lokoli	4	6^{4}

Final
(France) M Gicquel (Ukraine) S Stakhovsky	w/o
(United States) R Harrison (United States) A Kuznetsov
