= 2013 Open Harmonie mutuelle – Singles =

Singles
- 2013 Open Harmonie mutuelle

Final
- Champion: (Netherlands) Jesse Huta Galung
- Runner-up: (France) Kenny de Schepper
- Score: 7–6^{(7–4)}, 4–6, 7–6^{(7–3)}

Events
Singles	Doubles
← 2012 ·	Open Harmonie mutuelle	· 2014 →

Grégoire Burquier was the defending champion but decided not to participate.
Jesse Huta Galung won the final 7–6^{(7–4)}, 4–6, 7–6^{(7–3)} against Kenny de Schepper.

== Seeds ==
1. (France) Kenny de Schepper (final)
2. (Austria) Andreas Haider-Maurer (second round)
3. (France) Marc Gicquel (first round)
4. (France) Josselin Ouanna (first round)
5. (Germany) Dustin Brown (second round)
6. (France) Nicolas Mahut (first round)
7. (Serbia) Boris Pašanski (first round)
8. (Poland) Michał Przysiężny (first round)

== Draw ==
=== Key ===
- Q = Qualifier
- WC = Wild card
- LL = Lucky loser
- Alt = Alternate
- SE = Special exempt
- PR = Protected ranking
- ITF = ITF entry
- JE = Junior exempt
- w/o = Walkover
- r = Retired
- d = Defaulted
- SR = Special ranking

=== Finals ===
Semifinals
1	(France) Kenny de Schepper	7^{7}	6
Q	(Austria) Martin Fischer	6^{4}	3
(Netherlands) Jesse Huta Galung	6	7
(Czech Republic) Jan Mertl	4	5

Final
1	(France) Kenny de Schepper	6^{4}	6	6^{3}
(Netherlands) Jesse Huta Galung	7^{7}	4	7^{7}

=== Top half ===
First round
1	(France) K de Schepper	6	6
WC	(France) R Jouan	2	2
(Germany) D Meffert	6	6
(Spain) I Navarro	1	3
WC	(France) F Martin	6	6
Q	(Serbia) D Petrović	3	2
(Ukraine) O Nedovyesov	6	6
7	(Serbia) B Pašanski	2	1
4	(France) J Ouanna	6^{2}	2
(France) D Guez	7^{7}	6
(Netherlands) B Westerhof	6^{5}	6	1
(Russia) K Kravchuk	7^{7}	4	6
(Spain) A Brugués-Davi	6	6
(Netherlands) M Middelkoop	2	4
Q	(Austria) M Fischer	6	7^{7}
6	(France) N Mahut	4	6^{3}

Second round
1	(France) K de Schepper	7	6
(Germany) D Meffert	5	3
WC	(France) F Martin	4	0
(Ukraine) O Nedovyesov	6	6
(France) D Guez	6	6
(Russia) K Kravchuk	2	3
(Spain) A Brugués-Davi	1	0
Q	(Austria) M Fischer	6	6

Quarterfinals
1	(France) K de Schepper	4	6	6
(Ukraine) O Nedovyesov	6	3	3
(France) D Guez	6	3	4
Q	(Austria) M Fischer	4	6	6

Semifinals
1	(France) K de Schepper	7^{7}	6
Q	(Austria) M Fischer	6^{4}	3

=== Bottom half ===
First round
5	(Germany) D Brown	6	4	6
(Belgium) N Desein	4	6	4
WC	(France) M Rodrigues	6^{4}	2
(France) S Robert	7^{7}	6
WC	(France) C Lestienne	2	2
(Bosnia and Herzegovina) M Bašić	6	6
(Netherlands) J Huta Galung	7	7^{8}
3	(France) M Gicquel	5	6^{6}
8	(Poland) M Przysiężny	3	4
(France) V Millot	6	6
Q	(France) H Nys	4	1
(Czech Republic) J Mertl	6	6
(France) N Renavand	6	6
(Romania) V Crivoi	1	4
Q	(Switzerland) A Bossel	4	3
2	(Austria) A Haider-Maurer	6	6

Second round
5	(Germany) D Brown	4	3
(France) S Robert	6	6
(Bosnia and Herzegovina) M Bašić	6^{5}	6^{5}
(Netherlands) J Huta Galung	7^{7}	7^{7}
(France) V Millot	0^{r}
(Czech Republic) J Mertl	3
(France) N Renavand	7^{7}	6
2	(Austria) A Haider-Maurer	6^{1}	3

Quarterfinals
(France) S Robert	2	6^{4}
(Netherlands) J Huta Galung	6	7^{7}
(Czech Republic) J Mertl	4	6	6
(France) N Renavand	6	4	4

Semifinals
(Netherlands) J Huta Galung	6	7
(Czech Republic) J Mertl	4	5
