= 2014 BNP Paribas Primrose Bordeaux =

- Date: 12–18 May
- Edition: 7th
- Draw: 32S / 16D
- Prize money: €85,000
- Surface: Clay
- Location: Bordeaux, France

Champions

Singles
- (France) Julien Benneteau

Doubles
- (France) Marc Gicquel / (Ukraine) Sergiy Stakhovsky
- BNP Paribas Primrose Bordeaux

The 2014 BNP Paribas Primrose Bordeaux was a professional tennis tournament played on clay courts. It was the seventh edition of the tournament which was part of the 2014 ATP Challenger Tour. It took place in Bordeaux, France between 12 and 18 May 2014.

== Singles main-draw entrants ==
=== Seeds ===
Country	Player	Rank^{1}	Seed
FRA	Julien Benneteau	48	1
USA	Steve Johnson	69	2
FRA	Kenny de Schepper	74	3
FRA	Paul-Henri Mathieu	87	4
UKR	Sergiy Stakhovsky	88	5
BEL	David Goffin	103	6
CZE	Jiří Veselý	106	7
TUN	Malek Jaziri	117	8

- ^{1} Rankings are as of May 5, 2014.

=== Other entrants ===
The following players received wildcards into the singles main draw:

- (France) Julien Benneteau
- (France) Jonathan Eysseric
- (France) Florent Serra
- (France) Maxime Teixeira

The following players received special exempt into the singles main draw:

- (Spain) Rubén Ramírez Hidalgo
- (Switzerland) Yann Marti

The following players received entry from the qualifying draw:

- (Argentina) Martín Alund
- (France) Josselin Ouanna
- (Belgium) Olivier Rochus
- (Argentina) Andrea Collarini

== Doubles main-draw entrants ==
=== Seeds ===
Country	Player	Country	Player	Rank^{1}	Seed
CRO	Marin Draganja	ROU	Florin Mergea	97	1
GRB	Ken Skupski	GRB	Neal Skupski	143	2
GER	Dominik Meffert	AUT	Philipp Oswald	190	3
POL	Mateusz Kowalczyk	SWE	Andreas Siljeström	197	4

- ^{1} Rankings are as of May 5, 2014.

=== Other entrants ===
The following pairs received wildcards into the doubles main draw:

- (France) Florent Serra / (France) Maxime Teixeira
- (France) Jonathan Eysseric / (France) Romain Jouan
- (France) Enzo Couacaud / (France) Laurent Lokoli

== Champions ==
=== Singles ===
- (France) Julien Benneteau def. (United States) Steve Johnson, 6–3, 6–2

=== Doubles ===
- (France) Marc Gicquel / (Ukraine) Sergiy Stakhovsky def. (United States) Ryan Harrison / (United States) Alex Kuznetsov by Walkover
