= 2010 Open Prévadiès Saint–Brieuc – Singles =

Brieuc – Singles
- 2010 Open Prévadiès Saint–Brieuc

Final
- Champion: (Poland) Michał Przysiężny
- Runner-up: (Spain) Rubén Ramírez Hidalgo
- Score: 4–6, 6–2, 6–3

Events
Singles	Doubles
← 2009 ·	Open Prévadiès Saint–Brieuc	· 2011 →

Josselin Ouanna was the defending champion, however he lost to Rubén Ramírez Hidalgo in the quarterfinals.
Michał Przysiężny defeated Ramírez Hidalgo in the final (4–6, 6–2, 6–3).

== Seeds ==
1. (Spain) Marcel Granollers (second round)
2. (Russia) Teymuraz Gabashvili (semifinals)
3. (France) Josselin Ouanna (quarterfinals)
4. (Poland) Michał Przysiężny (champion)
5. (Spain) Rubén Ramírez Hidalgo (final)
6. (France) Édouard Roger-Vasselin (withdrew due to a left wrist)
7. (Belgium) Kristof Vliegen (second round)
8. (Czech Republic) Jan Hernych (first round)
9. (France) Thierry Ascione (quarterfinals)

== Draw ==
=== Key ===
- Q = Qualifier
- WC = Wild card
- LL = Lucky loser
- Alt = Alternate
- SE = Special exempt
- PR = Protected ranking
- ITF = ITF entry
- JE = Junior exempt
- w/o = Walkover
- r = Retired
- d = Defaulted
- SR = Special ranking

=== Finals ===
Semifinals
Q	(Australia) Samuel Groth	6^{2}	6	3
5	(Spain) Rubén Ramírez Hidalgo	7	4	6
4	(Poland) Michał Przysiężny	7	4	6
2	(Russia) Teymuraz Gabashvili	6^{6}	6	3

Final
5	(Spain) Rubén Ramírez Hidalgo	6	2	3
4	(Poland) Michał Przysiężny	4	6	6

=== Top half ===
First round
1	(Spain) M Granollers	7	6
(New Zealand) D King-Turner	5	3
WC	(France) B Paire	7	6
(United States) R DeHeart	6^{6}	4
(Germany) S Stadler	3	4
(Netherlands) I Sijsling	6	6
Q	(Australia) S Groth	7	6
8	(Czech Republic) J Hernych	5	1
3	(France) J Ouanna	6	6
(Spain) D Marrero	2	4
(Spain) I Cervantes-Huegun	6	3	6
(Italy) M Crugnola	3	6	3
(Ukraine) S Bubka	5	6^{1}
(Belgium) Y Mertens	7	7
(Belarus) U Ignatik	3	4
5	(Spain) R Ramírez Hidalgo	6	6

Second round
1	(Spain) M Granollers	4	3
WC	(France) B Paire	6	6
(Netherlands) I Sijsling	3	1
Q	(Australia) S Groth	6	6
3	(France) J Ouanna	3	6	6
(Spain) I Cervantes-Huegun	6	3	2
(Belgium) Y Mertens	4	5
5	(Spain) R Ramírez Hidalgo	6	7

Quarterfinals
WC	(France) B Paire	3	2
Q	(Australia) S Groth	6	6
3	(France) J Ouanna	4	1
5	(Spain) R Ramírez Hidalgo	6	6

Semifinals
Q	(Australia) S Groth	6^{2}	6	3
5	(Spain) R Ramírez Hidalgo	7	4	6

=== Bottom half ===
First round
7	(Belgium) K Vliegen	6	1
(France) A Mannarino	3	1	r
WC	(France) C-A Brezac	6	6
(Kazakhstan) Y Schukin	1	4
Q	(Lithuania) L Grigelis	6	6
Q	(France) F Reynet	3	2
(Brazil) C Zampieri	6^{5}	6	3
4	(Poland) M Przysiężny	7	3	6
9	(France) T Ascione	6	6
Q	(France) C Roche	2	0
WC	(France) O Patience	7	5	7
WC	(France) R Jouan	5	7	6^{2}
LL	(Australia) R Junaid	6^{2}	3
(Czech Republic) J Minář	7	6
(Germany) T Kamke	1	4
2	(Russia) T Gabashvili	6	6

Second round
7	(Belgium) K Vliegen	2	6	6^{3}
WC	(France) C-A Brezac	6	4	7
Q	(Lithuania) L Grigelis	3	5
4	(Poland) M Przysiężny	6	7
9	(France) T Ascione	4	7	7
WC	(France) O Patience	6	5	6^{3}
(Czech Republic) J Minář	6	6^{4}	1
2	(Russia) T Gabashvili	4	7	6

Quarterfinals
WC	(France) C-A Brezac	6^{4}	2
4	(Poland) M Przysiężny	7	6
9	(France) T Ascione	3	4
2	(Russia) T Gabashvili	6	6

Semifinals
4	(Poland) M Przysiężny	7	4	6
2	(Russia) T Gabashvili	6^{6}	6	3
