= 2009 Open Prévadiès – Doubles =

Doubles
- 2009 Open Prévadiès

Final
- Champions: (United States) David Martin (Germany) Simon Stadler
- Runners-up: (Australia) Peter Luczak (Australia) Joseph Sirianni
- Score: 6–3, 6–2

Events
Singles	Doubles
← 2008 ·	Open Prévadiès	· 2010 →

Adrian Cruciat and Daniel Muñoz-de la Nava were the defending champions, but only Cruciat partnered up with Adrian Ungur, but they lost to Luczak and Sirianni in the first round.
David Martin and Simon Stadler won in the final 6–3, 6–2, against Peter Luczak and Joseph Sirianni.

== Seeds ==
1. (United States) Eric Butorac / (United States) Travis Rettenmaier (semifinals)
2. (France) Olivier Charroin / (France) Nicolas Tourte (quarterfinals)
3. (Czech Republic) Dušan Karol / (Czech Republic) Jaroslav Pospíšil (quarterfinals)
4. (Spain) Miguel Ángel López Jaén / (Spain) Carles Poch-Gradin (first round)

== Draw ==
=== Key ===
- Q = Qualifier
- WC = Wild card
- LL = Lucky loser
- Alt = Alternate
- SE = Special exempt
- PR = Protected ranking
- ITF = ITF entry
- JE = Junior exempt
- w/o = Walkover
- r = Retired
- d = Defaulted
- SR = Special ranking

=== Draw ===
First round
WC	(France) C-A Brezac (France) V Stouff	6	4	[7]
WC	(France) R Jouan (France) A Renard	4	6	[10]
(Australia) P Luczak (Australia) J Sirianni	6	6
(Romania) A Cruciat (Romania) A Ungur	3	3
(United States) B Battistone (Brazil) M Torres	6	3	[5]
(Switzerland) G Bastl (Czech Republic) P Šnobel	4	6	[10]
(Argentina) JP Brzezicki (Peru) I Miranda	1	6	[10]
4	(Spain) MÁ López Jaén (Spain) C Poch-Gradin	6	3	[5]
(Russia) I Belyaev (Latvia) D Pavlovs	3	4
(United States) D Martin (Germany) S Stadler	6	6

Quarterfinals
1	(United States) E Butorac (United States) T Rettenmaier	6	6
WC	(France) R Jouan (France) A Renard	1	2
3	(Czech Republic) D Karol (Czech Republic) J Pospíšil	3	4
(Australia) P Luczak (Australia) J Sirianni	6	6
(Switzerland) G Bastl (Czech Republic) P Šnobel	6	3	[11]
(Argentina) JP Brzezicki (Peru) I Miranda	1	6	[13]
(United States) D Martin (Germany) S Stadler	6^{7}	6	[10]
2	(France) O Charroin (France) N Tourte	7	3	[7]

Semifinals
1	(United States) E Butorac (United States) T Rettenmaier	5	2
(Australia) P Luczak (Australia) J Sirianni	7	6
(Argentina) JP Brzezicki (Peru) I Miranda	4	3
(United States) D Martin (Germany) S Stadler	6	6

Finals
(Australia) P Luczak (Australia) J Sirianni	3	2
(United States) D Martin (Germany) S Stadler	6	6
