= 2013 Open Harmonie mutuelle – Doubles =

Doubles
- 2013 Open Harmonie mutuelle

Final
- Champions: (Poland) Tomasz Bednarek (Sweden) Andreas Siljeström
- Runners-up: (Netherlands) Jesse Huta Galung (Russia) Konstantin Kravchuk
- Score: 6–3, 4–6, [10–7]

Events
Singles	Doubles
← 2012 ·	Open Harmonie mutuelle	· 2014 →

Laurynas Grigelis and Rameez Junaid were the defending champions but Grigelis decided not to participate.
Junaid played alongside Dustin Brown, but lost in the semifinals to Jesse Huta Galung and Konstantin Kravchuk.
They lost in the final 3–6, 6–4, [7–10] to Tomasz Bednarek and Andreas Siljeström.

== Seeds ==
1. (Germany) Dustin Brown / (Australia) Rameez Junaid (semifinals)
2. (United Kingdom) Jamie Delgado / (Slovakia) Igor Zelenay (semifinals)
3. (Poland) Tomasz Bednarek / (Sweden) Andreas Siljeström (champions)
4. (Austria) Martin Fischer / (Poland) Mateusz Kowalczyk (first round)

== Draw ==
=== Key ===
- Q = Qualifier
- WC = Wild card
- LL = Lucky loser
- Alt = Alternate
- SE = Special exempt
- PR = Protected ranking
- ITF = ITF entry
- JE = Junior exempt
- w/o = Walkover
- r = Retired
- d = Defaulted
- SR = Special ranking

=== Draw ===
First round
1	(Germany) D Brown (Australia) R Junaid	6	6
(Spain) A Brugués-Davi (Ukraine) O Nedovyesov	2	4
(Belgium) N Desein (Netherlands) S Groen	w/o
(Czech Republic) J Mertl (Spain) I Navarro
4	(Austria) M Fischer (Poland) M Kowalczyk	6^{1}	1
(Germany) D Meffert (Austria) P Oswald	7^{7}	6
(Netherlands) J Huta Galung (Russia) K Kravchuk	6	6^{5}	[10]
(United States) Adham El-Effendi (United Kingdom) D Walsh	3	7^{7}	[3]
(France) F Martin (France) S Robert	3	6	[6]
(France) R Jouan (France) M Rodrigues	6	1	[10]
WC	(Belgium) Arnaud Grard (France) Glenn Le Flochmoen	1	1
3	(Poland) T Bednarek (Sweden) A Siljeström	6	6
(France) V Millot (France) J Ouanna	4	2
(France) Laurent Gabail (France) Laurent Malouli	6	6
(Republic of Ireland) J Cluskey (Netherlands) M Middelkoop	3	2
2	(United Kingdom) J Delgado (Slovakia) I Zelenay	6	6

Quarterfinals
1	(Germany) D Brown (Australia) R Junaid	6^{5}	6	[11]
(Belgium) N Desein (Netherlands) S Groen	7^{7}	3	[9]
(Germany) D Meffert (Austria) P Oswald	3	6	[6]
(Netherlands) J Huta Galung (Russia) K Kravchuk	6	4	[10]
(France) R Jouan (France) M Rodrigues	1	2
3	(Poland) T Bednarek (Sweden) A Siljeström	6	6
(France) L Gabail (France) L Malouli	3	2
2	(United Kingdom) J Delgado (Slovakia) I Zelenay	6	6

Semifinals
1	(Germany) D Brown (Australia) R Junaid	6	6^{1}	[9]
(Netherlands) J Huta Galung (Russia) K Kravchuk	3	7^{7}	[11]
3	(Poland) T Bednarek (Sweden) A Siljeström	7^{7}	6
2	(United Kingdom) J Delgado (Slovakia) I Zelenay	6^{4}	2

Final
(Netherlands) J Huta Galung (Russia) K Kravchuk	3	6	[7]
3	(Poland) T Bednarek (Sweden) A Siljeström	6	4	[10]
