= 2009 Open Prévadiès – Singles =

Singles
- 2009 Open Prévadiès

Final
- Champion: (France) Josselin Ouanna
- Runner-up: (France) Adrian Mannarino
- Score: 7–5, 1–6, 6–4

Events
Singles	Doubles
← 2008 ·	Open Prévadiès	· 2010 →

Christophe Rochus was the defending champion.
Josselin Ouanna won the singles competition, after she won 7–5, 1–6, 6–4, against Adrian Mannarino.

== Seeds ==
1. (France) Adrian Mannarino (final)
2. (Germany) Simon Stadler (first round)
3. (France) Josselin Ouanna (champion)
4. (France) Édouard Roger-Vasselin (first round)
5. (Czech Republic) Pavel Šnobel (first round)
6. (Slovenia) Grega Žemlja (quarterfinals)
7. (Kazakhstan) Yuri Schukin (semifinals)
8. (Spain) Miguel Ángel López Jaén (first round)

== Draw ==
=== Key ===
- Q = Qualifier
- WC = Wild card
- LL = Lucky loser
- Alt = Alternate
- ITF = ITF entry
- PR = Protected ranking
- SR = Special ranking
- SE = Special exempt
- JE = Junior exempt
- JR = Junior Accelerator Programme entrant
- CO = College Accelerator Programme entrant
- NG = Next Gen Accelerator Program entrant
- w/o = Walkover
- r = Retired
- d = Defaulted

=== Final four ===
Semifinals
1	(France) Adrian Mannarino	6	6
7	(Kazakhstan) Yuri Schukin	3	4
3	(France) Josselin Ouanna	2	6	6
(Italy) Andrea Stoppini	6	1	1

Final
1	(France) Adrian Mannarino	5	6	4
3	(France) Josselin Ouanna	7	1	6

=== Top half ===
First round
1	(France) A Mannarino	6	7
(Czech Republic) J Pospíšil	2	6^{2}
(France) É Prodon	6	6^{5}	4
(Australia) P Luczak	2	7	6
Q	(France) J-C Faurel	7	6
(Denmark) K Pless	6^{8}	2
WC	(France) R Jouan	6^{4}	5
6	(Slovenia) G Žemlja	7	7
4	(France) É Roger-Vasselin	2	6^{4}
(Germany) Alexander Flock	6	7
(Monaco) J-R Lisnard	6	6^{5}	7
WC	(France) J Dasnières de Veigy	1	7	6^{6}
(Australia) J Sirianni	6	3	6
(Romania) A Cruciat	2	6	3
Q	(Spain) G Alcaide	6	4	1
7	(Kazakhstan) Y Schukin	4	6	6

Second round
1	(France) A Mannarino	6	6
(Australia) P Luczak	2	3
Q	(France) J-C Faurel	6	2	5
6	(Slovenia) G Žemlja	4	6	7
(Germany) A Flock	5	6	6^{3}
(Monaco) J-R Lisnard	7	4	7
(Australia) J Sirianni	2	2
7	(Kazakhstan) Y Schukin	6	6

Quarterfinals
1	(France) A Mannarino	6	6
6	(Slovenia) G Žemlja	4	1
(Monaco) J-R Lisnard	4	0
7	(Kazakhstan) Y Schukin	6	6

Semifinals
1	(France) A Mannarino	6	6
7	(Kazakhstan) Y Schukin	3	4

=== Bottom half ===
First round
5	(Czech Republic) P Šnobel	2	4
WC	(France) M Rodrigues	6	6
(France) T Ascione	6	6
Q	(Republic of Ireland) J McGee	4	3
(Switzerland) G Bastl	3	5
SE	(Czech Republic) J Minář	6	7
(Romania) A Ungur	1	6^{4}
3	(France) J Ouanna	6	7
8	(Spain) MÁ López Jaén	3	1
(Argentina) JP Brzezicki	6	6
WC	(France) Charles-Antoine Brezac	6	6
(Peru) I Miranda	3	2
(Belgium) N Desein	3	6	6
Q	(Spain) C Poch-Gradin	6	2	1
(Italy) A Stoppini	2	6	6
2	(Germany) S Stadler	6	4	0

Second round
WC	(France) M Rodrigues	2	2
(France) T Ascione	6	6
SE	(Czech Republic) J Minář	3	7	6^{4}
3	(France) J Ouanna	6	5	7
(Argentina) JP Brzezicki	6	3	6
WC	(France) C-A Brezac	4	6	1
(Belgium) N Desein	4	6^{6}
(Italy) A Stoppini	6	7

Quarterfinals
(France) T Ascione	5	4
3	(France) J Ouanna	7	6
(Argentina) JP Brzezicki	2	1
(Italy) A Stoppini	6	6

Semifinals
3	(France) J Ouanna	2	6	6
(Italy) A Stoppini	6	1	1
