= 2011 Open EuroEnergie de Quimper – Doubles =

Doubles
- 2011 Open EuroEnergie de Quimper

Final
- Champions: (United States) James Cerretani (Canada) Adil Shamasdin
- Runners-up: (United Kingdom) Jamie Delgado (United Kingdom) Jonathan Marray
- Score: 6–3, 5–7, [10–5]

Events
Singles	Doubles
Open EuroEnergie de Quimper	· 2012 →

James Cerretani and Adil Shamasdin won the title. They defeated Jamie Delgado and Jonathan Marray 6–3, 5–7, [10–5] in the final.

== Seeds ==
Cerretani and Shamasdin received a bye into the second round.

1. (United States) James Cerretani / (Canada) Adil Shamasdin (champions)
2. (United Kingdom) Jamie Delgado / (United Kingdom) Jonathan Marray (final)
3. (Philippines) Treat Conrad Huey / (India) Purav Raja (semifinals)
4. (Switzerland) Yves Allegro / (France) Olivier Charroin (semifinals)

== Draw ==
=== Key ===
- Q = Qualifier
- WC = Wild card
- LL = Lucky loser
- Alt = Alternate
- SE = Special exempt
- PR = Protected ranking
- ITF = ITF entry
- JE = Junior exempt
- w/o = Walkover
- r = Retired
- d = Defaulted
- SR = Special ranking

=== Draw ===
First round
(France) J Eysseric (France) N Renavand	1	7	[11]
(United States) K Kim (Israel) A Weintraub	6	5	[9]
3	(Philippines) TC Huey (India) P Raja	6	7^{7}
(France) Charles-Antoine Brézac (France) Vincent Stouff	3	6^{3}
(France) R Jouan (France) M Rodrigues
(France) G Sakharov (France) M Teixeira	w/o
(Finland) H Kontinen (Germany) S Rieschick	6	7^{8}
(Republic of Ireland) J Cluskey (Republic of Ireland) J McGee	2	6^{6}
(France) G Burquier (France) Clément Reix	2	7	[4]
4	(Switzerland) Y Allegro (France) O Charroin	6	5	[10]
WC	(France) Frédéric Le Bian (France) Kevin Nerzic	4	1
(France) Florian Reynet (France) Laurent Rochette	6	6
(France) P-H Herbert (Republic of Ireland) B King	3	4
2	(United Kingdom) J Delgado (United Kingdom) J Marray	6	6

Quarterfinals
1	(United States) J Cerretani (Canada) A Shamasdin	6	6
(France) J Eysseric (France) N Renavand	2	2
3	(Philippines) TC Huey (India) P Raja	3	7	[10]
(France) R Jouan (France) M Rodrigues	6	5	[8]
(Finland) H Kontinen (Germany) S Rieschick	3	3
4	(Switzerland) Y Allegro (France) O Charroin	6	6
(France) F Reynet (France) L Rochette	4	0
2	(United Kingdom) J Delgado (United Kingdom) J Marray	6	6

Semifinals
1	(United States) J Cerretani (Canada) A Shamasdin	7^{7}	6
3	(Philippines) TC Huey (India) P Raja	6^{4}	4
4	(Switzerland) Y Allegro (France) O Charroin	3	4
2	(United Kingdom) J Delgado (United Kingdom) J Marray	6	6

Final
1	(United States) J Cerretani (Canada) A Shamasdin	6	5	[10]
2	(United Kingdom) J Delgado (United Kingdom) J Marray	3	7	[5]
