= 2012 Open BNP Paribas Banque de Bretagne – Doubles =

Doubles
- 2012 Open BNP Paribas Banque de Bretagne

Final
- Champions: (France) Pierre-Hugues Herbert (France) Maxime Teixeira
- Runners-up: (Germany) Dustin Brown (United Kingdom) Jonathan Marray
- Score: 7–6^{(7–5)}, 6–4

Events
Singles	Doubles
← 2011 ·	Open BNP Paribas Banque de Bretagne	· 2013 →

James Cerretani and Adil Shamasdin were the defending champions but decided not to participate.
Pierre-Hugues Herbert and Maxime Teixeira won the title, defeating Dustin Brown and Jonathan Marray 7–6^{(7–5)}, 6–4 in the final.

== Seeds ==
1. (Germany) Dustin Brown / (United Kingdom) Jonathan Marray (final)
2. (United Kingdom) Jamie Delgado / (United Kingdom) Ken Skupski (semifinals)
3. (Australia) Jordan Kerr / (United States) Travis Parrott (quarterfinals)
4. (France) Olivier Charroin / (India) Purav Raja (quarterfinals)

== Draw ==
=== Key ===
- Q = Qualifier
- WC = Wild card
- LL = Lucky loser
- Alt = Alternate
- SE = Special exempt
- PR = Protected ranking
- ITF = ITF entry
- JE = Junior exempt
- w/o = Walkover
- r = Retired
- d = Defaulted
- SR = Special ranking

=== Draw ===
First round
1	(Germany) D Brown (United Kingdom) J Marray	6	6
(France) J Dasnières de Veigy (France) M Gicquel	3	3
(United Kingdom) D Rice (United Kingdom) S Thornley	6	6
WC	(France) K de Schepper (France) F Martin	4	4
3	(Australia) J Kerr (United States) T Parrott	w/o
(Spain) R Bautista-Agut (Spain) A Brugués-Davi
PR	(Australia) R Junaid (Germany) S Stadler	6	6
(Germany) D Brands (Netherlands) I Sijsling	4	4
(France) P-H Herbert (France) M Teixeira	6	6
WC	(France) O Patience (Serbia) D Petrović	2	2
(Spain) P Carreño-Busta (Portugal) J Sousa	5	5
4	(France) O Charroin (India) P Raja	7	7
WC	(France) R Jouan (France) J Ouanna	6^{1}	7	[11]
(France) A Clément (France) N Devilder	7^{7}	5	[9]
(Poland) T Bednarek (Italy) A Motti	3	4
2	(United Kingdom) J Delgado (United Kingdom) K Skupski	6	6

Quarterfinals
1	(Germany) D Brown (United Kingdom) J Marray	6	7^{11}
(United Kingdom) D Rice (United Kingdom) S Thornley	2	6^{9}
3	(Australia) J Kerr (United States) T Parrott	6	4	[8]
PR	(Australia) R Junaid (Germany) S Stadler	1	6	[10]
(France) P-H Herbert (France) M Teixeira	7	6
4	(France) O Charroin (India) P Raja	5	4
WC	(France) R Jouan (France) J Ouanna	7^{10}	4	[5]
2	(United Kingdom) J Delgado (United Kingdom) K Skupski	6^{8}	6	[10]

Semifinals
1	(Germany) D Brown (United Kingdom) J Marray	6	6
PR	(Australia) R Junaid (Germany) S Stadler	2	4
(France) P-H Herbert (France) M Teixeira	7^{8}	2	[11]
2	(United Kingdom) J Delgado (United Kingdom) K Skupski	6^{6}	6	[9]

Final
1	(Germany) D Brown (United Kingdom) J Marray	6^{5}	4
(France) P-H Herbert (France) M Teixeira	7^{7}	6
