= Michael Carney =

Michael Carney may refer to:

- Michael Carney (politician)
- Michael Carney (artist)
