= 2010 Open Prévadiès Saint–Brieuc – Doubles =

Brieuc – Doubles
- 2010 Open Prévadiès Saint–Brieuc

Final
- Champions: (Belarus) Uladzimir Ignatik (Spain) David Marrero
- Runners-up: (United States) Brian Battistone (United States) Ryler DeHeart
- Score: 4–6, 6–4, [10–5]

Events
Singles	Doubles
← 2009 ·	Open Prévadiès Saint–Brieuc	· 2011 →

David Martin and Simon Stadler are the defending champions; however, they didn't play together.
David Martin partnered up with Philipp Marx; however, they lost to Brian Battistone and Ryler DeHeart in the quarterfinals.
Simon Stadler chose to compete with Tobias Kamke, but lost in the first round to Yves Allegro and Jeff Coetzee.
Uladzimir Ignatik and David Marrero won the doubles competition, after their won against Brian Battistone and Ryler DeHeart in the final (4–6, 6–4, [10–5]).

== Seeds ==
1. (United States) David Martin / (Germany) Philipp Marx (quarterfinals)
2. (United Kingdom) Jonathan Marray / (United Kingdom) Jamie Murray (quarterfinals)
3. (Switzerland) Yves Allegro / (South Africa) Jeff Coetzee (semifinals)
4. (Russia) Teymuraz Gabashvili / (Spain) Marcel Granollers (quarterfinals)

== Draw ==
=== Key ===
- Q = Qualifier
- WC = Wild card
- LL = Lucky loser
- Alt = Alternate
- SE = Special exempt
- PR = Protected ranking
- ITF = ITF entry
- JE = Junior exempt
- w/o = Walkover
- r = Retired
- d = Defaulted
- SR = Special ranking

=== Draw ===
First round
1	(United States) D Martin (Germany) P Marx	6^{4}	6	[10]
WC	(France) R Jouan (France) O Patience	7	3	[7]
(United States) B Battistone (United States) R DeHeart	7	6
(Australia) R Junaid (Australia) J Sirriani	6^{3}	3
3	(Switzerland) Y Allegro (South Africa) J Coetzee	6	6
(Germany) T Kamke (Germany) S Stadler	4	3
(Germany) M Emmrich (Sweden) A Siljeström	4	4
(Ukraine) S Bubka (United Kingdom) J Delgado	6	6
(Australia) S Groth (New Zealand) D King-Turner	2	6	[7]
(France) O Charroin (France) A Renard	6	4	[10]
(France) C-A Brezac (France) V Stouff	6	4	[10]
4	(Russia) T Gabashvili (Spain) M Granollers	4	6	[12]
(Spain) I Cervantes-Huegun (Kazakhstan) Y Schukin	6^{7}	5
(Belarus) U Ignatik (Spain) D Marrero	7	7
(Philippines) TC Huey (India) H Mankad	3	3
2	(United Kingdom) J Marray (United Kingdom) J Murray	6	6

Quarterfinals
1	(United States) D Martin (Germany) P Marx	4	2
(United States) B Battistone (United States) R DeHeart	6	6
3	(Switzerland) Y Allegro (South Africa) J Coetzee	6	6
(Ukraine) S Bubka (United Kingdom) J Delgado	4	1
(France) O Charroin (France) A Renard	2	6	[10]
4	(Russia) T Gabashvili (Spain) M Granollers	6	2	[8]
(Belarus) U Ignatik (Spain) D Marrero	6	6
2	(United Kingdom) J Marray (United Kingdom) J Murray	4	1

Semifinals
(United States) B Battistone (United States) R DeHeart	6	6
3	(Switzerland) Y Allegro (South Africa) J Coetzee	4	4
(France) O Charroin (France) A Renard	3	6	[7]
(Belarus) U Ignatik (Spain) D Marrero	6	4	[10]

Final
(United States) B Battistone (United States) R DeHeart	6	4	[5]
(Belarus) U Ignatik (Spain) D Marrero	4	6	[10]
