= 2012 Open BNP Paribas Banque de Bretagne =

- Date: 6–12 February
- Edition: 11th
- Location: Quimper, France

Champions

Singles
- (Netherlands) Igor Sijsling

Doubles
- (France) Pierre-Hugues Herbert / (France) Maxime Teixeira
- Open BNP Paribas Banque de Bretagne

The 2012 Open BNP Paribas Banque de Bretagne was a professional tennis tournament played on hard courts. It was the eleventh edition of the tournament which was part of the 2012 ATP Challenger Tour. It took place in Quimper, France between 6 and 12 February 2012.

== ATP entrants ==
=== Seeds ===
Country	Player	Rank^{1}	Seed
FRA	Édouard Roger-Vasselin	98	1
RSA	Rik de Voest	119	2
TUN	Malek Jaziri	122	3
GER	Daniel Brands	129	4
GER	Björn Phau	134	5
ESP	Arnau Brugués Davi	140	6
FRA	Florent Serra	142	7
ESP	Pablo Carreño Busta	143	8

- ^{1} Rankings are as of January 30, 2012.

=== Other entrants ===
The following players received wildcards into the singles main draw:

- (France) Jonathan Dasnières de Veigy
- (France) Romain Jouan
- (France) Paul-Henri Mathieu
- (France) Guillaume Rufin

The following players received entry as a special exempt into the singles main draw:

- (Romania) Marius Copil

The following players received entry from the qualifying draw:

- (Switzerland) Adrien Bossel
- (France) Pierre-Hugues Herbert
- (France) Olivier Patience
- (France) Laurent Rochette

The following players received entry as a lucky loser into the singles main draw:

- (France) Elie Rousset

== Champions ==
=== Singles ===
(Netherlands) Igor Sijsling def. (Tunisia) Malek Jaziri, 6–3, 6–4

=== Doubles ===
(France) Pierre-Hugues Herbert / (France) Maxime Teixeira def. (Germany) Dustin Brown / (United Kingdom) Jonathan Marray, 7–6^{(7–5)}, 6–4
