= 2010 Open Prévadiès Saint–Brieuc =

- Date: March 29 – April 4
- Edition: 7th
- Location: Saint-Brieuc, France

Champions

Singles
- (Poland) Michał Przysiężny

Doubles
- (Belarus) Uladzimir Ignatik / (Spain) David Marrero
← 2009 ·	Saint-Brieuc Challenger	· 2011 →

The 2010 Open Prévadiès Saint–Brieuc was a professional tennis tournament played on outdoor red clay courts. It was part of the 2010 ATP Challenger Tour. It took place in Saint-Brieuc, France between 29 March and 4 April 2010.

== ATP entrants ==
=== Seeds ===
Nationality	Player	Ranking*	Seeding
ESP	Marcel Granollers	92	1
RUS	Teymuraz Gabashvili	112	2
FRA	Josselin Ouanna	115	3
POL	Michał Przysiężny	130	4
ESP	Rubén Ramírez Hidalgo	131	5
FRA	~~Édouard Roger-Vasselin~~	~~137~~	~~6~~
BEL	Kristof Vliegen	150	7
CZE	Jan Hernych	151	8
FRA	Thierry Ascione	162	9

- Rankings are as of March 22, 2010.

=== Other entrants ===
The following players received wildcards into the singles main draw:

- (France) Charles-Antoine Brézac
- (France) Romain Jouan
- (France) Benoît Paire
- (France) Olivier Patience

The following players received entry from the qualifying draw:

- (Lithuania) Laurynas Grigelis
- (Australia) Samuel Groth
- (France) Florian Reynet
- (France) Charles Roche

== Champions ==
=== Singles ===
(Poland) Michał Przysiężny def. (Spain) Rubén Ramírez Hidalgo, 4–6, 6–2, 6–3

=== Doubles ===
(Belarus) Uladzimir Ignatik / (Spain) David Marrero def. (United States) Brian Battistone / (United States) Ryler DeHeart, 4–6, 6–4, [10–5]
