= 2013 Open Harmonie mutuelle =

- Date: 1–7 April
- Edition: 10th
- Draw: 32S / 16D
- Prize money: €30,000+H
- Surface: Hard
- Location: Saint-Brieuc, France

Champions

Singles
- (Netherlands) Jesse Huta Galung

Doubles
- (Poland) Tomasz Bednarek / (Sweden) Andreas Siljeström
← 2012 ·	Saint-Brieuc Challenger	· 2014 →

The 2013 Open Harmonie mutuelle was a professional tennis tournament played on hard courts. It was the tenth edition of the tournament which was part of the 2013 ATP Challenger Tour. It took place in Saint-Brieuc, France between 1 and 7 April 2013.

== Singles main-draw entrants ==
=== Seeds ===
Country	Player	Rank^{1}	Seed
FRA	Kenny de Schepper	107	1
AUT	Andreas Haider-Maurer	115	2
FRA	Marc Gicquel	117	3
FRA	Josselin Ouanna	143	4
GER	Dustin Brown	153	5
FRA	Nicolas Mahut	158	6
SRB	Boris Pašanski	164	7
POL	Michał Przysiężny	165	8

- ^{1} Rankings are as of March 18, 2013.

=== Other entrants ===
The following players received wildcards into the singles main draw:

- (France) Romain Jouan
- (France) Constant Lestienne
- (France) Fabrice Martin
- (France) Mathieu Rodrigues

The following players received entry from the qualifying draw:

- (Switzerland) Adrien Bossel
- (Austria) Martin Fischer
- (France) Hugo Nys
- (Serbia) Danilo Petrović

== Doubles main-draw entrants ==
=== Seeds ===
Country	Player	Country	Player	Rank^{1}	Seed
GER	Dustin Brown	AUS	Rameez Junaid	168	1
GBR	Jamie Delgado	SVK	Igor Zelenay	170	2
POL	Tomasz Bednarek	SWE	Andreas Siljeström	197	3
AUT	Martin Fischer	POL	Mateusz Kowalczyk	266	4

- ^{1} Rankings as of March 18, 2013.

=== Other entrants ===
The following pairs received wildcards into the doubles main draw:

- (Belgium) Arnaud Grard / (France) Glenn Le Flochmoen

== Champions ==
=== Singles ===
- (Netherlands) Jesse Huta Galung def. (France) Kenny de Schepper, 7–6 ^{(7–4)}, 4–6, 7–6 ^{(7–3)}

=== Doubles ===
- (Poland) Tomasz Bednarek / (Sweden) Andreas Siljeström def. (Netherlands) Jesse Huta Galung / (Russia) Konstantin Kravchuk, 6–3, 4–6, [10–7]
