= Adam Brown Crosby =

Canadian politician (1859–1921)

Adam Brown Crosby (May 12, 1859 – March 10, 1921) was a politician in Nova Scotia, Canada.

Born in Belfast Ireland, he emigrated as a child with his parents, Adam Crosby and Jane Brown, and settled first at Sydney Mines and then Cow Bay (Port Morien) Nova Scotia. His father worked at the Gowrie Mine in Port Morien that would later employ Adam and Adam's brother James. Realizing that mining was not for him, Adam B. Crosby moved to Halifax in 1880 and worked as a sales clerk and then as a ship broker. He was elected several times as mayor of Halifax, serving from 1902 to 1905, and again from 1908 to 1909. He was elected as the Conservative Member of Parliament for Halifax on October 26, 1908, serving one term before being defeated in the general election of September 21, 1911. Sir Robert Borden, Prime Minister of Canada, appointed Crosby to the Senate on January 20, 1917, upon the death of Senator William MacDonald, after whom Glace Bay's "Senator's Corner" is named. Senator Crosby served in the Senate for seven years until his death on March 10, 1921.

== Electoral history ==
1911 Canadian federal election: Halifax
| Party | Candidate | Votes | % | ±% | Elected |
|---|---|---|---|---|---|
| Conservative | Robert Borden | 7,040 | 25.46 | -1.34 | ✓ |
| Liberal | Alexander Kenneth Maclean | 6,946 | 25.12 | | ✓ |
| Liberal | Edward Blackadder | 6,879 | 24.88 | | |
| Conservative | Adam Brown Crosby | 6,787 | 24.54 | -1.27 | |
| Total valid votes | | 27,652 | 100.00 | | |
| Conservative hold | | Swing | | -2.61 | |
| Liberal gain from Conservative | | Swing | | – | |
Source(s) "Halifax (1867- )". History of Federal Ridings Since 1867. Library of Parliament. Two members were elected from the district.

1908 Canadian federal election: Halifax
| Party | Candidate | Votes | % | ±% | Elected |
|---|---|---|---|---|---|
| Conservative | Robert Borden | 7,386 | 26.80 | +2.42 | ✓ |
| Conservative | Adam Brown Crosby | 7,115 | 25.82 | | ✓ |
| Liberal | William Roche | 6,635 | 24.08 | -1.91 | |
| Liberal | Michael Carney | 6,423 | 23.31 | -3.22 | |
| Total valid votes | | 27,559 | 98.47 | | |
| Total rejected, unmarked and declined ballots | | 428 | 1.53 | +1.03 | |
| Turnout | | | ≥71.14 | -2.80 | |
| Eligible voters | | 19,670 | | | |
| Conservative notional gain from Liberal | | Swing | | +5.13 | |
Source(s) Source: Sayers, Anthony (2017). "1908 Federal Election". Canadian Elections Database. Two members were elected from the district.
