= William Roche (Nova Scotia politician) =

Canadian politician (1842–1925)

The Hon. William Roche
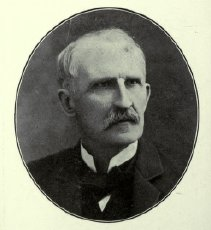

Member of the Nova Scotia House of Assembly for Halifax County
- In office 1886–1897

Member of the Canadian Parliament for Halifax
- In office 1900–1904 Serving with Robert Borden
- Preceded by: Benjamin Russell
- In office 1904–1908 Serving with Michael Carney
- Succeeded by: Adam Brown Crosby

Senator for Halifax, Nova Scotia
- In office 1910–1925
- Appointed by: Wilfrid Laurier

Personal details
- Born: February 11, 1842 Halifax, Nova Scotia
- Died: October 19, 1925 (aged 83)
- Party: Liberal
- Relations: Charles Roche, uncle

William Roche (February 11, 1842 – October 19, 1925) was a Canadian politician and merchant.

== Biography ==
Born in Halifax, Nova Scotia, he was the son of William Roche and Susan Manning and was educated at the Halifax Academy and the Free Church Academy. Roche married Clara MacLean of Pictou. He served as an alderman for Halifax from 1849 to 1850. Roche was vice-president of the Union Bank of Canada and President of the Halifax Fire Insurance Company. Roche served as a member of the Legislative Assembly of Nova Scotia from 1886 to 1897. From 1896 to 1897, he was a Minister Without Portfolio and Member of the Executive Council. He was elected to the House of Commons of Canada for the electoral district of Halifax in the 1900 federal election. A Liberal, he was re-elected in 1904 and was defeated in 1908. He was summoned to the Senate of Canada on the advice of Wilfrid Laurier representing the senatorial division of Halifax, Nova Scotia in 1910. He served until his death in 1925.

His uncle Charles Roche served in the Nova Scotia assembly.

== Electoral results ==
1908 Canadian federal election: Halifax
| Party | Candidate | Votes | % | ±% | Elected |
|---|---|---|---|---|---|
| Conservative | Robert Borden | 7,386 | 26.80 | +2.42 | ✓ |
| Conservative | Adam Brown Crosby | 7,115 | 25.82 | | ✓ |
| Liberal | William Roche | 6,635 | 24.08 | -1.91 | |
| Liberal | Michael Carney | 6,423 | 23.31 | -3.22 | |
| Total valid votes | | 27,559 | 98.47 | | |
| Total rejected, unmarked and declined ballots | | 428 | 1.53 | +1.03 | |
| Turnout | | | ≥71.14 | -2.80 | |
| Eligible voters | | 19,670 | | | |
| Conservative notional gain from Liberal | | Swing | | +5.13 | |
Source(s) Source: Sayers, Anthony (2017). "1908 Federal Election". Canadian Elections Database. Two members were elected from the district.

1904 Canadian federal election: Halifax
| Party | Candidate | Votes | % | ±% | Elected |
|---|---|---|---|---|---|
| Liberal | William Roche | 7,430 | 26.53 | +1.43 | ✓ |
| Liberal | Michael Carney | 7,277 | 25.98 | | ✓ |
| Conservative | Robert Borden | 6,830 | 24.39 | -1.29 | |
| Conservative | John C. O'Mullin | 6,472 | 23.11 | | |
| Total valid votes | | 28,009 | 99.50 | | |
| Total rejected, unmarked and declined ballots | | 141 | 0.50 | | |
| Turnout | | | ≥73.04 | | |
| Eligible voters | | 19,035 | | | |
| Liberal hold | | Swing | | +3.21 | |
| Liberal gain from Conservative | | Swing | | – | |
Source(s) Source: Sayers, Anthony (2017). "1904 Federal Election". Canadian Elections Database. Two members were elected from the district.

1900 Canadian federal election: Halifax
| Party | Candidate | Votes | % | ±% | Elected |
|---|---|---|---|---|---|
| Conservative | Robert Borden | 5,705 | 25.67 | -0.86 | ✓ |
| Liberal | William Roche | 5,577 | 25.09 | | ✓ |
| Conservative | Thomas Edward Kenny | 5,562 | 25.03 | +0.88 | |
| Liberal | William B. Wallace | 5,380 | 24.21 | | |
| Total valid votes | | 22,224 | 100.00 | | |
| Conservative hold | | Swing | | +0.02 | |
| Liberal hold | | Swing | | -0.02 | |
Source(s) "Halifax (1867- )". History of Federal Ridings Since 1867. Library of Parliament. Two members were elected from the district.
