= Michael Carney (politician) =

Irish-born Canadian politician

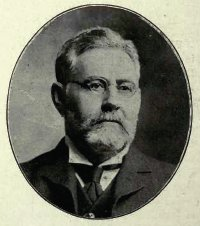

Member of the Canadian Parliament for Halifax
- In office 1904–1908 Serving with William Roche
- Preceded by: Robert Borden
- Succeeded by: Robert Borden

Personal details
- Born: 11 May 1839 Waterford, Ireland
- Died: 2 February 1919 (aged 79)
- Party: Liberal

Michael Carney (11 May 1839 – 2 February 1919) was a Canadian politician.

Born in Waterford, Ireland, Carney was educated at the Common School of Halifax, Nova Scotia. A merchant, he was first elected to the House of Commons of Canada for the electoral district of Halifax in the 1904 general elections. A Liberal, he was defeated in 1908.

1908 Canadian federal election: Halifax
Party	Candidate	Votes	%	±%	Elected
Conservative	Robert Borden	7,386	26.80	+2.42	✓
Conservative	Adam Brown Crosby	7,115	25.82		✓
Liberal	William Roche	6,635	24.08	-1.91	
Liberal	Michael Carney	6,423	23.31	-3.22	
Total valid votes		27,559	98.47		
Total rejected, unmarked and declined ballots		428	1.53	+1.03	
Turnout			≥71.14	-2.80	
Eligible voters		19,670			
Conservative notional gain from Liberal		Swing		+5.13	
Source(s) Source: Sayers, Anthony (2017). "1908 Federal Election". Canadian Elections Database. Two members were elected from the district.

1904 Canadian federal election: Halifax
Party	Candidate	Votes	%	±%	Elected
Liberal	William Roche	7,430	26.53	+1.43	✓
Liberal	Michael Carney	7,277	25.98		✓
Conservative	Robert Borden	6,830	24.39	-1.29	
Conservative	John C. O'Mullin	6,472	23.11		
Total valid votes		28,009	99.50		
Total rejected, unmarked and declined ballots		141	0.50		
Turnout			≥73.04		
Eligible voters		19,035			
Liberal hold		Swing		+3.21	
Liberal gain from Conservative		Swing		–	
Source(s) Source: Sayers, Anthony (2017). "1904 Federal Election". Canadian Elections Database. Two members were elected from the district.
