= Charles Roche =

Canadian politician

Charles Roche (1798 – January 2, 1878) was a Canadian dry goods merchant and political figure in Nova Scotia. He represented Shelburne township in the Nova Scotia House of Assembly from 1830 to 1836.

He was born in Shelburne, Nova Scotia, the son of Captain Charles Roche, a native of Cork, Ireland. His parents were loyalists who settled in New York state, later receiving a land grant at Shelburne. He died in Halifax in 1878. His nephew William Roche also served in the assembly.
