= 2012 Open Prévadiès Saint–Brieuc =

- Date: 2–8 April
- Edition: 9th
- Surface: Clay
- Location: Saint-Brieuc, France

Champions

Singles
- (France) Grégoire Burquier

Doubles
- (Lithuania) Laurynas Grigelis / (Australia) Rameez Junaid
← 2011 ·	Saint-Brieuc Challenger	· 2013 →

The 2012 Open Prévadiès Saint–Brieuc was a professional tennis tournament played on clay courts. It was the ninth edition of the tournament which was part of the 2012 ATP Challenger Tour. It took place in Saint-Brieuc, France between 2 and 8 April 2012.

== Singles main draw entrants ==
=== Seeds ===
Country	Player	Rank^{1}	Seed
ESP	Daniel Gimeno Traver	105	1
FRA	Stéphane Robert	136	2
FRA	Marc Gicquel	151	3
FRA	Maxime Teixeira	157	4
FRA	Kenny de Schepper	160	5
FRA	Augustin Gensse	161	6
GER	Simon Greul	189	7
AUS	James Duckworth	193	8

- ^{1} Rankings are as of March 19, 2012.

=== Other entrants ===
The following players received wildcards into the singles main draw:

- (France) Charles-Antoine Brézac
- (France) Josselin Ouanna
- (France) Olivier Patience
- (France) Laurent Rochette

The following players received entry from the qualifying draw:

- (Poland) Tomasz Bednarek
- (Spain) José Checa Calvo
- (Romania) Victor Crivoi
- (France) Nicolas Renavand

== Champions ==
=== Singles ===
- (France) Grégoire Burquier def. (France) Augustin Gensse, 7–5, 6–7^{(5–7)}, 7–6^{(7–3)}

=== Doubles ===
(Lithuania) Laurynas Grigelis / (Australia) Rameez Junaid def. (France) Stéphane Robert / (France) Laurent Rochette, 1–6, 6–2, [10–6]
