= 2009 Open Prévadiès =

- Date: March 30 – April 5
- Edition: 6th
- Location: Saint-Brieuc, France

Champions

Singles
- (France) Josselin Ouanna

Doubles
- (United States) David Martin / (Germany) Simon Stadler
← 2008 ·	Saint-Brieuc Challenger	· 2010 →

The 2009 Open Prévadiès was a professional tennis tournament played on outdoor red clay courts. It was part of the 2009 ATP Challenger Tour. It took place in Saint-Brieuc, France between 30 March and 5 April 2009.

== Singles entrants ==
=== Seeds ===
Nationality	Player	Ranking*	Seeding
FRA	Adrian Mannarino	135	1
GER	Simon Stadler	151	2
FRA	Josselin Ouanna	153	3
FRA	Édouard Roger-Vasselin	167	4
CZE	Pavel Šnobel	174	5
SLO	Grega Žemlja	177	6
KAZ	Yuri Schukin	178	7
ESP	Miguel Ángel López Jaén	180	8

- Rankings are as of March 23, 2009.

=== Other entrants ===
The following players received wildcards into the singles main draw:

- (France) Charles-Antoine Brézac
- (France) Jonathan Dasnières de Veigy
- (France) Romain Jouan
- (France) Mathieu Rodrigues

The following players received entry from the qualifying draw:

- (Spain) Guillermo Alcaide
- (France) Jean-Christophe Faurel
- (Republic of Ireland) James McGee
- (Spain) Carles Poch Gradin

The following player received special exempt into the main draw:

- (Czech Republic) Jan Minář

== Champions ==
=== Men's singles ===
(France) Josselin Ouanna def. (France) Adrian Mannarino, 7–5, 1–6, 6–4

=== Men's doubles ===
(United States) David Martin / (Germany) Simon Stadler def. (Australia) Peter Luczak / (Australia) Joseph Sirianni, 6–3, 6–2
