= 2011 Open Prévadiès Saint–Brieuc =

Tennis tournament

- Date: 28 March – 3 April
- Edition: 8th
- Location: Saint-Brieuc, France

Champions

Singles
- (France) Maxime Teixeira

Doubles
- (Poland) Tomasz Bednarek / (Sweden) Andreas Siljeström
← 2010 ·	Open Prévadiès Saint–Brieuc	· 2012 →

The 2011 Open Prévadiès Saint–Brieuc was a professional tennis tournament played on clay courts. It was the eighth edition of the tournament which was part of the 2011 ATP Challenger Tour. It took place in Saint-Brieuc, France between 28 March – 3 April 2011.

== Singles main draw entrants ==
=== Seeds ===
Country	Player	Rank^{1}	Seed
ARG	Máximo González	98	1
POL	Michał Przysiężny	117	2
FRA	Benoît Paire	124	3
IRL	Conor Niland	139	4
FRA	Vincent Millot	161	5
FRA	Stéphane Robert	166	6
POL	Jerzy Janowicz	168	7
FRA	David Guez	170	8

- Rankings are as of March 21, 2011.

=== Other entrants ===
The following players received wildcards into the singles main draw:

- (France) Charles-Antoine Brézac
- (France) Nicolas Devilder
- (France) Mathieu Rodrigues
- (France) Ludovic Walter

The following players received entry from the qualifying draw:

- (Romania) Adrian Cruciat
- (France) Florent Diep
- (Serbia) Boris Pašanski
- (France) Nicolas Renavand

== Champions ==
=== Singles ===
(France) Maxime Teixeira def. (France) Benoît Paire, 6–3, 6–0

=== Doubles ===
(Poland) Tomasz Bednarek / (Sweden) Andreas Siljeström def. (France) Grégoire Burquier / (France) Romain Jouan, 6–4, 6–7(4), [14–12]
