= David Guez =

French tennis player

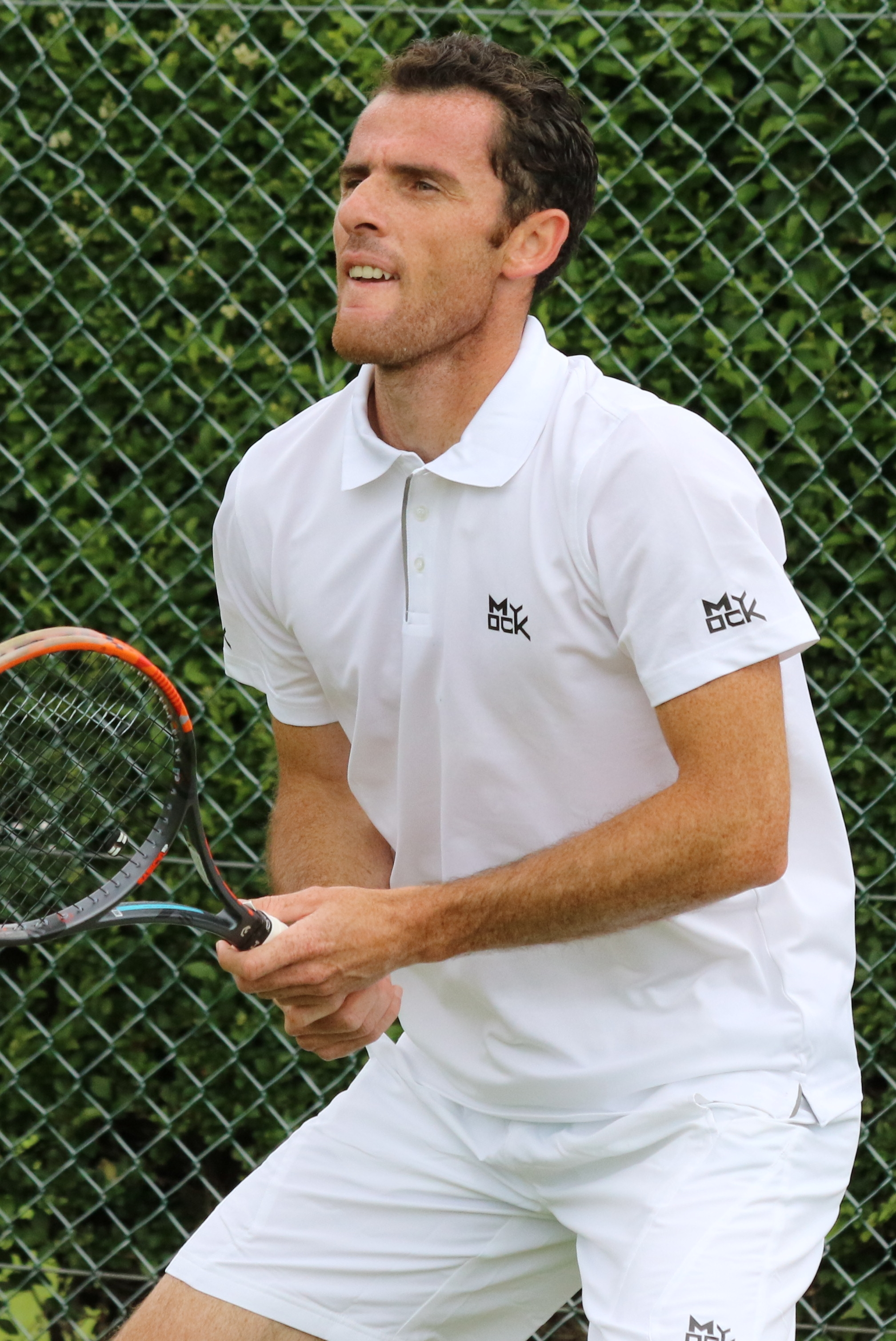
- Guez at the 2016 Wimbledon Championships
- Country (sports): France
- Residence: Marseille, France
- Born: 8 November 1982 (age 43) Marseille, France
- Height: 1.85 m (6 ft 1 in)
- Turned pro: 2002
- Plays: Right-handed (two-handed backhand)
- Prize money: $ 684,843

Singles
- Career record: 2–16 (at ATP Tour level, Grand Slam level, and in Davis Cup)
- Career titles: 0
- Highest ranking: No. 116 (5 July 2010)
- Current ranking: No. 268 (16 April 2018)

Grand Slam singles results
- Australian Open: 1R (2010, 2014)
- French Open: 1R (2010, 2011)
- Wimbledon: Q2 (2010)
- US Open: Q3 (2010)

Doubles
- Career record: 3–14 (at ATP Tour level, Grand Slam level, and in Davis Cup)
- Career titles: 0
- Highest ranking: No. 242 (23 April 2007)
- Current ranking: No. 921 (16 April 2018)

Grand Slam doubles results
- French Open: 2R (2016)
- Last updated on: 16 April 2018.

David Guez (born 8 December 1982) is a French former tennis player. He achieved a career-high singles ranking of World No. 116 in July 2010.

In 2025, Guez was banned from professional tennis for four years and a $25,000 fine ($17,500 suspended) after admitting to match fixing tennis matches played in 2017 and 2018.,.

== Career ==
At the 2009 Grand Prix de Tennis de Lyon he won with Rajeev Ram and reached to the second round, where he lost with Gilles Simon. In his best win to date, he beat Stanislas Wawrinka 6–3, 6–4 in the 2009 BNP Paribas Masters. In the second round of that tournament, he lost 4–6, 5–7, against his compatriot Gaël Monfils.

He has reached the final of seventeen Futures tournaments; in twelve of these he was victorious. David won one of ATP Challenger Tour tournaments (in St. Petersburg, where he defeated Édouard Roger-Vasselin in the final).

He qualified for his only Grand Slam tournament on 15 January 2010 (after winning against Ruben Bemelmans, Dayne Kelly and Édouard Roger-Vasselin in the qualifications). However, he lost to Julien Benneteau in the first round.

In 2014, he again made his way through qualifying, defeating Hiroki Moriya, Lorenzo Giustino and 32nd seed Yūichi Sugita to make it into the main draw of the 2014 Australian Open. He was defeated by countryman Richard Gasquet in the first round.

== Singles finals ==
Legend (singles)
Challengers (5)
Futures (17)

=== Wins (16) ===
No.	Date	Tournament	Surface	Opponent	Score
1.	3 May 2004	Morocco F3	Clay	(Morocco) Mehdi Tahiri	7–6^{(7–3)}, 6–4
2.	12 July 2004	Portugal F2	Hard	(Spain) Marcel Granollers	6–2, 6–4
3.	5 September 2005	Romania F2	Clay	(Algeria) Slimane Saoudi	6–1, 6–2
4.	12 June 2006	Tunisia F3	Clay	(France) Xavier Audouy	6–1, 6–2
5.	7 August 2006	St. Petersburg, Russia	Clay	(France) Édouard Roger-Vasselin	6–0, 6–2
6.	13 April 2008	Great Britain F17	Hard	(Kazakhstan) Andrey Golubev	6–4, 6–2
7.	21 January 2008	China F2	Hard	(Monaco) Benjamin Balleret	6–3, 6–4
8.	9 March 2008	France F4	Hard	(Monaco) Thomas Oger	6–4, 7–5
9.	11 May 2009	Great Britain F7	Clay	(France) Sébastien de Chaunac	6–3, 3–6, 6–0
10.	22 June 2009	France F9	Clay	(Russia) Valery Rudnev	6–4, 7–6^{(7–4)}
11.	6 July 2009	France F11	Clay	(Netherlands) Michel Meijer	6–1, 6–2
12.	14 September 2009	Spain F31	Hard	(France) Pierre Metenier	6–2, 6–3
13.	5 October 2008	France F17	Hard	(Latvia) Andis Juška	7–6^{(7–4)}, 6–4
14.	4 July 2010	Arad, Romania	Clay	(France) Benoît Paire	6–3, 6–1
15.	13 January 2011	Quimper, France	Hard	(France) Kenny de Schepper	6–2, 4–6, 7–6
16.	25 June 2012	France F11	Clay	(France) Jonathan Eysseric	6–4, 6–4
17.	15 October 2012	France F12	Hard(i)	(Switzerland) Michael Lammer	7–6^{(7–3)}, 6–7^{(6–8)}, 6–1
18.	28 January 2013	France F3	Hard(i)	(France) Constant Lestienne	6–0, 6–1
19.	24 June 2013	France F10	Clay	(France) Gianni Mina	6–4, 6–0
20.	10 March 2014	France F6	Hard(i)	(United States) Noah Rubin	6–4, 6–0

=== Runner-up (7) ===
No.	Date	Tournament	Surface	Opponent	Score
1.	3 May 2004	Algieria F2	Clay	(France) Gilles Simon	2–6, 0–6
2.	12 July 2004	France F11	Clay	(France) Bertrand Contzler	3–6, 4–6
3.	8 September 2005	Pamplona, Spain	Hard	(France) Nicolas Devilder	2–6, 1–6
4.	19 June 2006	France F8	Hard	(France) Alexandre Sidorenko	2–6, 7–6^{(7–4)}, 4–6
5.	1 January 2007	Nouméa, New Caledonia	Hard	(United States) Michael Russell	0–6, 1–6
6.	1 September 2008	France F13	Hard	(Austria) Martin Fischer	2–6, 3–6
7.	2 February 2009	France F2	Hard	(Switzerland) Michael Lammer	4–6, 1–6

== Singles performance timeline ==
Key
W	F	SF	QF	#R	RR	Q#	DNQ	A	NH

(W) winner; (F) finalist; (SF) semifinalist; (QF) quarterfinalist; (#R) rounds 4, 3, 2, 1; (RR) round-robin stage; (Q#) qualification round; (DNQ) did not qualify; (A) absent; (NH) not held; (SR) strike rate (events won / competed); (W–L) win–loss record.
To avoid confusion and double counting, these charts are updated at the conclusion of a tournament or when the player's participation has ended.

Tournament	2007	2008	2009	2010	2011	2012	2013	2014	2015	W–L
Grand Slam tournaments
Australian Open	Q3	Q1	Q1	1R	Q1	Q3	Q2	1R	Q1	0–2
French Open	Q1	Q2	Q1	1R	1R	Q1	Q1	Q1	Q3	0–2
Wimbledon	A	A	A	Q2	A	A	Q1	Q1	A	0–0
US Open	Q2	A	Q1	Q3	Q2	A	Q1	A	Q2	0–0
Win–loss	0–0	0–0	0–0	0–2	0–1	0–0	0–0	0–1	0–0	0–4
