= Kenny de Schepper =

French tennis player

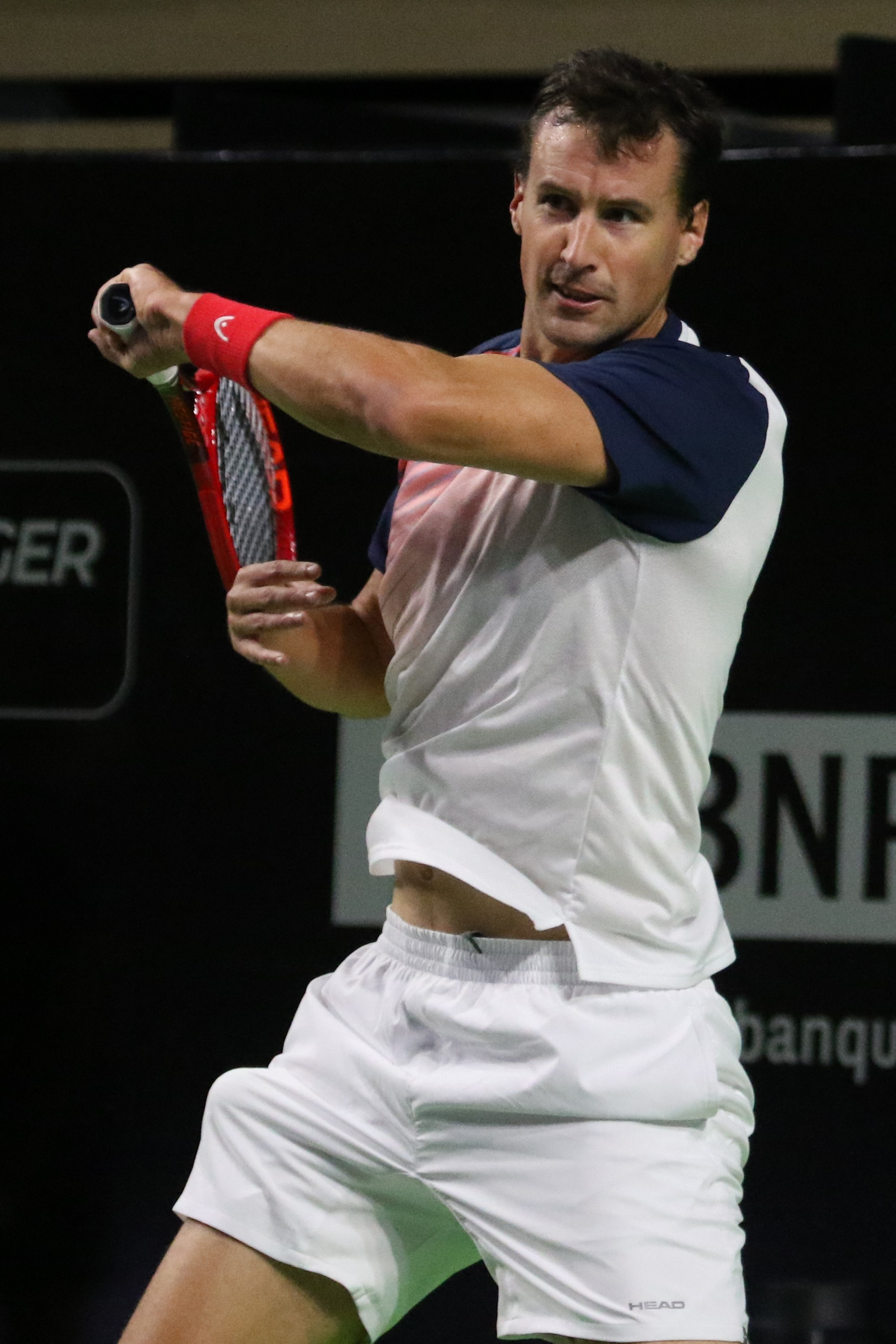
- De Schepper at the 2021 Internationaux de Tennis de Vendée
- Country (sports): France
- Residence: Toulouse, France
- Born: 29 May 1987 (age 39) Bordeaux, France
- Height: 2.03 m (6 ft 8 in)
- Turned pro: 2010
- Plays: Left-handed (one-handed backhand)
- Prize money: US $1,731,444

Singles
- Career record: 26–61
- Career titles: 0
- Highest ranking: No. 62 (7 April 2014)
- Current ranking: No. 946 (14 September 2026)

Grand Slam singles results
- Australian Open: 2R (2014)
- French Open: 2R (2014)
- Wimbledon: 4R (2013)
- US Open: 1R (2013, 2014)

Doubles
- Career record: 5–16
- Career titles: 0
- Highest ranking: No. 152 (27 February 2012)
- Current ranking: No. 1,950 (14 September 2026)

Grand Slam doubles results
- French Open: 2R (2011)

Team competitions
- Hopman Cup: RR (2016)
- Last updated on: 16 September 2026.

Kenny de Schepper (born 29 May 1987) is a French professional tennis player who competed on the ATP Challenger Tour. He has a career high ATP rankings of world No. 62 achieved in April 2014 in singles and No. 152 in doubles achieved in February 2012.

== Early life ==
De Schepper was born in Bordeaux, France. His father Éric, originally from Belgium, was a former professional squash player. De Schepper, who is two meters tall, joined the National tennis centre in Poitiers when he was 13, however after a while he stopped playing tennis for two years due to growth injuries.

== Career ==
=== 2010–2011: Turned Pro ===
De Schepper turned pro in 2010.

While not having any wins in 2011, he had several runner-up finishes in ITF Futures events and had a runner-up finish at an ATP Challenger event – the 2011 Open EuroEnergie de Quimper, where he lost to his compatriot David Guez in the final.

He won his first ATP Challenger title at the 2011 Open Diputación Ciudad de Pozoblanco event against Iván Navarro.

De Schepper made the main draw of the 2011 Wimbledon Championships. In the 2011 Wimbledon Championships qualifiers he defeated Ádám Kellner (Q1), Matthew Ebden (Q2), and Simone Bolelli (Q3).

=== 2012 ===
In October 2012, de Schepper won consecutive Challenger tournaments, taking him to a career high ranking of 123 in singles. The first of the two Challenger victories came in Mons, having qualified for the tournament, before securing a title in Rennes a week later, not dropping a set throughout the competition.

=== 2013 ===
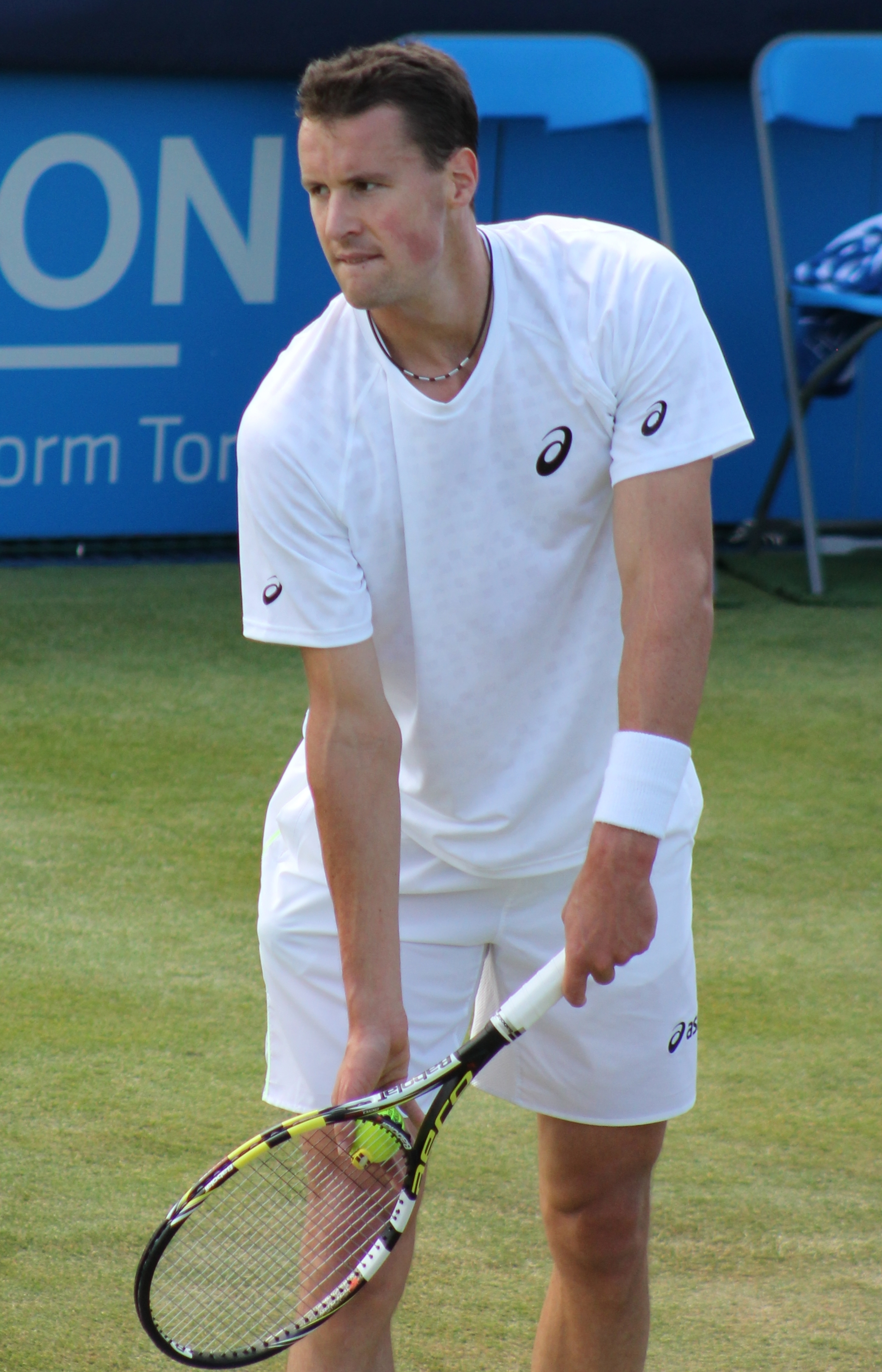
de Schepper at the 2013 Queen's Club Championships

De Schepper once again played at Wimbledon and this time progressed to the fourth round, the first time he had made the last 16 at a Grand Slam tournament, courtesy of wins over Paolo Lorenzi, Marin Čilić (by walkover) and Juan Mónaco. De Schepper faced Fernando Verdasco in the round of 16 and lost in straight sets. At the US Open, he lost in the first round to Bradley Klahn in four sets with three tie-breaks.

=== 2015 ===
De Schepper reached the first round of the Australian Open, losing to Lukáš Rosol in 5 sets. He lost in the first round of qualifying at the French Open. He advanced through the qualifiers to reach the 2nd round of the Wimbledon Championships before losing to Richard Gasquet in straight sets, with Gasquet reaching the semifinals.

=== 2016 ===
De Schepper opened his season by representing France at the 2016 Hopman Cup with teammate Caroline Garcia. He played against Andy Murray, Alexander Zverev and Nick Kyrgios, but did not record any wins.

=== 2017 ===
De Schepper qualified into the main draw in Montpellier, falling to eventual finalist Richard Gasquet in the quarterfinals. De Schepper defeated Mischa Zverev and Illya Marchenko in the process. He reached the same stage in Metz, before Mischa Zverev avenged his earlier defeat.

== ATP Challenger and ITF Tour Finals ==
=== Singles: 21 (8–13) ===
Legend (singles) ATP Challenger Tour (5–6) ITF Futures/World Tennis Tour (3–7)	Titles by surface Hard (7–11) Clay (1–2) Grass (0–0) Carpet (0–0)

Result	W–L	Date	Tournament	Tier	Surface	Opponent	Score
Loss	0–1	Oct 2010	France F17, Nevers	Futures	Hard (i)	(France) Grégoire Burquier	6–3, 4–6, 3–6
Win	1–1	Jan 2011	Great Britain F1, Glasgow	Futures	Hard (i)	(France) Alexandre Sidorenko	7–5, 7–5
Loss	1–2	Jan 2011	Great Britain F2, Sheffield	Futures	Hard (i)	(Finland) Harri Heliövaara	4–6, 7–5, 4–6
Loss	1–3	Feb 2011	Quimper, France	Challenger	Hard	(France) David Guez	2–6, 6–4, 6–7^{(5–7)}
Loss	1–4	Mar 2011	France F5, Poitiers	Futures	Hard (i)	(France) Marc Gicquel	6–7^{(4–7)}, 6–7^{(5–7)}
Loss	1–5	Apr 2011	France F6, Angers	Futures	Clay (i)	(France) Charles-Antoine Brézac	2–6, 5–7
Loss	1–6	Jul 2011	France F10, Montauban	Futures	Clay	(Chile) Jorge Aguilar	6–7^{(4–7)}, 4–6
Win	2–6	Jul 2011	Pozoblanco, Spain	Challenger	Hard	(Spain) Iván Navarro	2–6, 7–5, 6–3
Loss	2–7	Jul 2011	Recanati, Italy	Challenger	Hard	(France) Fabrice Martin	1–6, 7–6^{(8–6)}, 6–7^{(3–7)}
Win	3–7	Mar 2012	France F4, Lille	Futures	Hard (i)	(France) Romain Jouan	6–2, 4–6, 6–3
Loss	3–8	Mar 2012	France F5, Poitiers	Futures	Hard (i)	(France) Josselin Ouanna	6–7^{(2–7)}, 6–7^{(2–7)}
Win	4–8	Oct 2012	Mons, Belgium	Challenger	Hard (i)	(France) Michaël Llodra	7–6^{(9–7)}, 4–6, 7–6^{(7–4)}
Win	5–8	Oct 2012	Rennes, France	Challenger	Hard (i)	(Ukraine) Illya Marchenko	7–6^{(7–4)}, 6–2
Loss	5–9	Apr 2013	Saint-Brieuc, France	Challenger	Hard (i)	(Netherlands) Jesse Huta Galung	6–7^{(4–7)}, 6–4, 6–7^{(3–7)}
Loss	5–10	Oct 2013	Rennes, France	Challenger	Hard	(France) Nicolas Mahut	3–6, 6–7^{(3–7)}
Win	6–10	Mar 2014	Cherbourg, France	Challenger	Hard (i)	(Slovakia) Norbert Gombos	3–6, 6–2, 6–3
Loss	6–11	Apr 2014	Le Gosier, Guadeloupe	Challenger	Hard	(United States) Steve Johnson	1–6, 7–6^{(7–5)}, 6–7^{(2–7)}
Win	7–11	Sep 2016	Como, Italy	Challenger	Clay	(Italy) Marco Cecchinato	2–6, 7–6^{(7–0)}, 7–5
Loss	7–12	Jan 2018	Koblenz, Germany	Challenger	Hard (i)	(Germany) Mats Moraing	2–6, 1–6
Win	8–12	Mar 2022	M25 Toulouse-Balma, France	World Tennis Tour	Hard (i)	(Vietnam) Lý Hoàng Nam	6–3, 6–3
Loss	8–13	Jul 2023	M25 Porto, Portugal	World Tennis Tour	Hard	(France) Jules Marie	2–6, 6–4, 6–7^{(3–7)}

=== Doubles: 10 (3–7) ===
Legend (doubles) ATP Challenger Tour (0–4) ITF Futures Tour (3–3)	Titles by surface Hard (2–4) Clay (1–2) Grass (0–0) Carpet (0–1)

Result	W–L	Date	Tournament	Tier	Surface	Partner	Opponents	Score
Loss	0–1	Oct 2010	France F18, Saint-Dizier	Futures	Hard (i)	(France) Albano Olivetti	(France) Julien Maes (France) Fabrice Martin	6–2, 4–6, [4–10]
Win	1–1	Mar 2011	France F4, Lille	Futures	Hard (i)	(France) Alexandre Penaud	(France) Marc Gicquel (France) Nicolas Renavand	6–3, 2–6, [10–8]
Loss	1–2	Mar 2011	France F5, Poitiers	Futures	Hard (i)	(France) Julien Obry	(France) Romain Jouan (France) Fabrice Martin	6–7^{(5–7)}, 4–6
Loss	1–3	Oct 2011	Mons, Belgium	Challenger	Hard (i)	(France) Édouard Roger-Vasselin	(Sweden) Johan Brunström (United Kingdom) Ken Skupski	6–7^{(4–7)}, 3–6
Loss	1–4	Oct 2011	Rennes, France	Challenger	Carpet (i)	(France) Édouard Roger-Vasselin	(Germany) Martin Emmrich (Sweden) Andreas Siljeström	4–6, 4–6
Loss	1–5	Sep 2015	Como, Italy	Challenger	Clay	(France) Maxime Teixeira	(Germany) Gero Kretschmer (Germany) Alexander Satschko	6–7^{(3–7)}, 4–6
Loss	1–6	May 2018	Aix-en-Provence, France	Challenger	Clay	(Argentina) Guido Andreozzi	(Germany) Philipp Petzschner (Germany) Tim Pütz	7–6^{(7–3)}, 2–6, [8–10]
Loss	1–7	Jan 2021	M15 Bressuire, France	World Tennis Tour	Hard (i)	(Italy) Stefano Napolitano	(United States) Alafia Ayeni (United States) Roy Smith	6–7^{(4–7)}, 6–4, [5–10]
Win	2–7	Mar 2021	M25 Vale do Lobo, Portugal	World Tennis Tour	Hard	(France) Quentin Robert	(France) Antoine Escoffier (France) Hugo Voljacques	0–6, 6–4, [10–6]
Win	3–7	Nov 2023	M25 Benicarlo, Spain	World Tennis Tour	Clay	(Lithuania) Vilius Gaubas	(Bulgaria) Anthony Genov (Spain) Iker Urribarrens Ramirez	7–6 ^{(7–2)}, 3–6, [10–8]

== Singles performance timeline ==
Key
W	F	SF	QF	#R	RR	Q#	P#	DNQ	A	Z#	PO	G	S	B	NMS	NTI	P	NH

(W) winner; (F) finalist; (SF) semifinalist; (QF) quarterfinalist; (#R) rounds 4, 3, 2, 1; (RR) round-robin stage; (Q#) qualification round; (P#) preliminary round; (DNQ) did not qualify; (A) absent; (Z#) Davis/Fed Cup Zonal Group (with number indication) or (PO) play-off; (G) gold, (S) silver or (B) bronze Olympic/Paralympic medal; (NMS) not a Masters tournament; (NTI) not a Tier I tournament; (P) postponed; (NH) not held; (SR) strike rate (events won / competed); (W–L) win–loss record.
To avoid confusion and double counting, these charts are updated at the conclusion of a tournament or when the player's participation has ended.

Tournament	2010	2011	2012	2013	2014	2015	2016	2017	2018	2019	W–L
Grand Slam tournaments
Australian Open	A	A	1R	Q2	2R	1R	Q3	Q2	Q1	Q1	1–3
French Open	A	Q1	Q2	1R	2R	Q1	1R	Q1	Q1	A	1–3
Wimbledon	A	1R	2R	4R (Note: At Wimbledon 2013, de Schepper's second-round match was a walkover.)	1R	2R	Q2	Q1	Q1	A	4–5
US Open	A	Q1	A	1R	1R	A	A	Q1	Q2	A	0–2
Win–loss	0–0	0–1	1–2	2–3	2–4	1–2	0–1	0–0	0–0	0–0	7–13
Career statistics
Year-end ranking	470	139	119	84	106	148	162	159	197	694	

== Wins over top-10 players ==
#	Player	Rank	Event	Surface	Rd	Score	KdSR
2014
1.	(Latvia) Ernests Gulbis	10	Queen's Club Championships, United Kingdom	Grass	2R	7–6^{(7–3)}, 7–5	66
