= Maxime Teixeira =

French tennis player

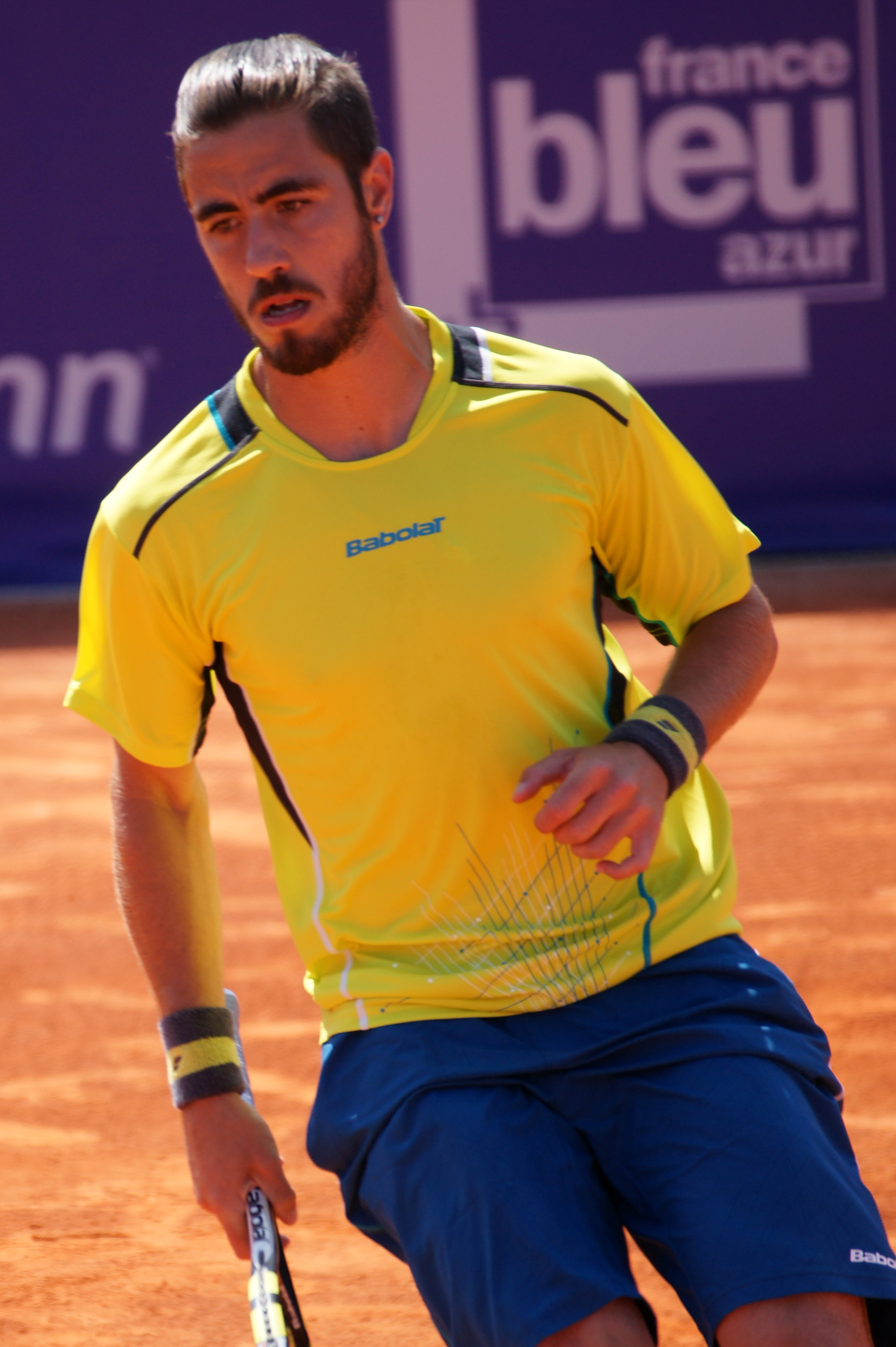
- Maxime Teixeira playing at Nice 2015
- Country (sports): France
- Residence: Paris, France
- Born: 18 January 1989 (age 37) La Rochelle, France
- Height: 1.85 m (6 ft 1 in)
- Turned pro: 2010
- Retired: August 2016 (last match played)
- Plays: Right-handed (two-handed backhand)
- Prize money: $340,404

Singles
- Career record: 1–5
- Career titles: 0
- Highest ranking: No. 154 (5 March 2012)

Grand Slam singles results
- Australian Open: Q2 (2012)
- French Open: 2R (2011)
- Wimbledon: Q3 (2012)
- US Open: Q3 (2013)

Doubles
- Career record: 0–4
- Career titles: 0
- Highest ranking: No. 193 (11 January 2016)

Grand Slam doubles results
- French Open: 1R (2013, 2014, 2015, 2016)
- Last updated on: 1 January 2026.

Maxime Teixeira (born 18 January 1989) is a French former professional tennis player. He competed mainly on the ATP Challenger Tour and ITF Futures circuit, both in singles and doubles. He reached his highest ATP singles ranking of World No. 154 in March 2012, and his highest ATP doubles ranking of No. 256 in July 2015.

== Career ==
He claimed his first Challenger singles title by winning the 2011 Open Prévadiès Saint–Brieuc in Saint-Brieuc, France. He won against Benoît Paire 6–3, 6–0.

He qualified for his first Grand Slam tournament at the 2011 French Open, where he reached the second round before being defeated by third seed Roger Federer.

== ATP Challenger and ITF Futures finals ==
=== Singles: 14 (5–9) ===
| Legend ATP Challenger (1–4) ITF Futures (4–5) | Finals by surface Hard (0–3) Clay (5–6) Grass (0–0) Carpet (0–0) |

| Result | W–L | Date | Tournament | Tier | Surface | Opponent | Score |
|---|---|---|---|---|---|---|---|
| Loss | 0–1 | Mar 2010 | Turkey F3, Antalya | Futures | Clay | (Slovakia) Pavol Červenák | 1–6, 3–6 |
| Win | 1–1 | Jul 2010 | Romania F7, Iași | Futures | Clay | (France) Gleb Sakharov | 6–2, 6–3 |
| Win | 2–1 | Aug 2010 | Romania F9, Arad | Futures | Clay | (Croatia) Kristijan Mesaroš | 7–5, 6–2 |
| Loss | 2–2 | Aug 2010 | Romania F10, Bucharest | Futures | Clay | (Romania) Andrei Mlendea | 3–6, 3–6 |
| Win | 3–2 | Sep 2010 | Morocco F6, Casablanca | Futures | Clay | (France) Florian Reynet | 6–1, 6–3 |
| Win | 4–2 | Jan 2011 | France F1, Bagnoles-de-l'Orne | Futures | Clay | (France) Jonathan Eysseric | 7–6^{(7–4)}, 3–6, 6–2 |
| Loss | 4–3 | Mar 2011 | Marrakech, Morocco | Challenger | Clay | (Portugal) Rui Machado | 3–6, 7–6^{(9–7)}, 4–6 |
| Win | 5–3 | Apr 2011 | Saint-Brieuc, France | Challenger | Clay | (France) Benoît Paire | 6–3, 6–0 |
| Loss | 5–4 | Sep 2011 | Brașov, Romania | Challenger | Clay | (France) Benoît Paire | 4–6, 0–3 ret. |
| Loss | 5–5 | Mar 2012 | Cherbourg, France | Challenger | Hard | (France) Josselin Ouanna | 3–6, 2–6 |
| Loss | 5–6 | Jul 2013 | Tampere, Finland | Challenger | Clay | (Netherlands) Jesse Huta Galung | 4–6, 3–6 |
| Loss | 5–7 | Jan 2015 | France F2, Bressuire | Futures | Hard | (France) Benoît Paire | 3–6, 6–0, 2–6 |
| Loss | 5–8 | Jul 2015 | France F12, Montauban | Futures | Clay | (France) Gleb Sakharov | 4–6, 4–6 |
| Loss | 5–9 | Feb 2016 | Great Britain F2, Sunderland | Futures | Hard | (Republic of Ireland) Sam Barry | 6–4, 3–6, 6–7^{(3–7)} |

=== Doubles: 12 (8–4) ===
| Legend ATP Challenger (3–2) ITF Futures (5–2) | Finals by surface Hard (1–1) Clay (7–3) Grass (0–0) Carpet (0–0) |

| Result | W–L | Date | Tournament | Tier | Surface | Partner | Opponents | Score |
|---|---|---|---|---|---|---|---|---|
| Loss | 0–1 | Mar 2008 | Egypt F2, Giza | Futures | Clay | (Argentina) Leandro Migani | (Egypt) Mahmoud Ezz (Egypt) Omar Hedayet | walkover |
| Win | 1–1 | Aug 2009 | Belgium F1, Eupen | Futures | Clay | (France) Dorian Descloix | (United Kingdom) Daniel Smethurst (United Kingdom) Maniel Bains | 7–6^{(7–1)}, 2–6, [10–5] |
| Win | 2–1 | Sep 2010 | Morocco F6, Casablanca | Futures | Clay | (France) Florian Reynet | (Austria) Nicolas Reissig (Austria) Tristan-Samuel Weissborn | 1–6, 7–5, [10–6] |
| Win | 3–1 | Feb 2012 | Quimper, France | Challenger | Hard | (France) Pierre-Hugues Herbert | (Germany) Dustin Brown (United Kingdom) Jonathan Marray | 7–6^{(7–5)}, 6–4 |
| Loss | 3–2 | Aug 2012 | Pozoblanco, Spain | Challenger | Hard | (France) Adrian Mannarino | (Russia) Konstantin Kravchuk (Ukraine) Denys Molchanov | 3–6, 3–6 |
| Win | 4–2 | Jul 2013 | San Benedetto, Italy | Challenger | Clay | (France) Pierre-Hugues Herbert | (Italy) Alessandro Giannessi (Portugal) João Sousa | 6–4, 6–3 |
| Win | 5–2 | Aug 2014 | Italy F26, Bolzano | Futures | Clay | (France) Guillaume Rufin | (Italy) Thomas Holzer (Italy) Patrick Prader | 7–6^{(7–3)}, 6–1 |
| Loss | 5–3 | Aug 2014 | Italy F27, Appiano | Futures | Clay | (Belgium) Yannik Reuter | (Bosnia and Herzegovina) Mirza Bašić (Bosnia and Herzegovina) Tomislav Brkić | 3–6, 4–6 |
| Win | 6–3 | Jun 2015 | Blois, France | Challenger | Clay | (France) Rémi Boutillier | (Brazil) Guilherme Clezar (Argentina) Nicolás Kicker | 6–3, 4–6, [10–8] |
| Win | 7–3 | Jul 2015 | France F12, Montauban | Futures | Clay | (France) Tristan Lamasine | (France) Yanais Laurent (France) Constant Lestienne | 6–4, 6–4 |
| Win | 8–3 | Jul 2015 | France F13, Bourg-en-Bresse | Futures | Clay | (France) Fabien Reboul | (France) Gianni Mina (France) Elie Rousset | 7–6^{(7–5)}, 4–6, [10–8] |
| Loss | 8–4 | Sep 2015 | Como, Italy | Challenger | Clay | (France) Kenny de Schepper | (Germany) Gero Kretschmer (Germany) Alexander Satschko | 6–7^{(3–7)}, 4–6 |

== Performance timeline ==
Key
| W | F | SF | QF | #R | RR | Q# | DNQ | A | NH |

(W) winner; (F) finalist; (SF) semifinalist; (QF) quarterfinalist; (#R) rounds 4, 3, 2, 1; (RR) round-robin stage; (Q#) qualification round; (DNQ) did not qualify; (A) absent; (NH) not held; (SR) strike rate (events won / competed); (W–L) win–loss record.
To avoid confusion and double counting, these charts are updated at the conclusion of a tournament or when the player's participation has ended.

=== Singles ===
| Tournament | 2011 | 2012 | 2013 | 2014 | SR | W–L | Win% |
|---|---|---|---|---|---|---|---|
Grand Slam tournaments
| Australian Open | A | Q2 | Q2 | Q1 | 0 / 0 | 0–0 | – |
| French Open | 2R | Q2 | 1R | Q1 | 0 / 2 | 1–2 | 33% |
| Wimbledon | A | Q3 | A | Q1 | 0 / 0 | 0–0 | – |
| US Open | Q1 | Q1 | Q3 | A | 0 / 0 | 0–0 | – |
| Win–loss | 1–1 | 0–0 | 0–1 | 0–0 | 0 / 2 | 1–2 | 33% |
ATP Tour Masters 1000
| Paris | Q1 | A | Q1 | A | 0 / 0 | 0–0 | – |
| Win–loss | 0–0 | 0–0 | 0–0 | 0–0 | 0 / 0 | 0–0 | – |
