= 2017 Open Harmonie mutuelle – Singles =

Singles
- 2017 Open Harmonie mutuelle

Final
- Champion: (Belarus) Egor Gerasimov
- Runner-up: (Germany) Tobias Kamke
- Score: 7–6^{(7–3)}, 7–6^{(7–5)}

Events
Singles	Doubles
← 2016 ·	Open Harmonie mutuelle	· 2018 →

Alexandre Sidorenko was the defending champion but chose not to defend his title.

Egor Gerasimov won the title after defeating Tobias Kamke 7–6^{(7–3)}, 7–6^{(7–5)} in the final.

== Seeds ==
1. (Austria) Gerald Melzer (first round)
2. (Ukraine) Sergiy Stakhovsky (quarterfinals)
3. (Slovakia) Norbert Gombos (first round)
4. (Slovakia) Lukáš Lacko (quarterfinals)
5. (France) Quentin Halys (first round)
6. (France) Kenny de Schepper (second round)
7. (Spain) Rubén Ramírez Hidalgo (second round)
8. (Germany) Tobias Kamke (final)

== Draw ==
=== Key ===
- Q = Qualifier
- WC = Wild card
- LL = Lucky loser
- Alt = Alternate
- SE = Special exempt
- PR = Protected ranking
- ITF = ITF entry
- JE = Junior exempt
- w/o = Walkover
- r = Retired
- d = Defaulted
- SR = Special ranking

=== Finals ===
Semifinals
Q	(Belarus) Egor Gerasimov	4	6	6
WC	(France) Corentin Moutet	6	4	3
(France) Gleb Sakharov	6^{4}	6	0
8	(Germany) Tobias Kamke	7^{7}	4	6

Final
Q	(Belarus) Egor Gerasimov	7^{7}	7^{7}
8	(Germany) Tobias Kamke	6^{3}	6^{5}

=== Top half ===
First round
1	(Austria) G Melzer	4	5
Q	(Belarus) E Gerasimov	6	7
PR	(Italy) S Bolelli	6	6
(Germany) D Brands	4	3
(Switzerland) M Chiudinelli	6	3	7^{7}
Q	(France) H Nys	1	6	6^{5}
Alt	(France) L Lokoli	1	6	3
7	(Spain) R Ramírez Hidalgo	6	4	6
3	(Slovakia) N Gombos	6^{1}	3
WC	(France) C Moutet	7^{7}	6
Q	(France) D Guez	3	6	4
WC	(France) R Boutillier	6	3	6
(Germany) Jeremy Jahn	6	6
(Russia) A Kudryavtsev	3	4
(Republic of Ireland) J McGee	6	6
5	(France) Q Halys	4	4

Second round
Q	(Belarus) E Gerasimov	6^{3}	6	6
PR	(Italy) S Bolelli	7^{7}	4	3
(Switzerland) M Chiudinelli	6	6
7	(Spain) R Ramírez Hidalgo	0	1
WC	(France) C Moutet	6	6
WC	(France) R Boutillier	4	4
(Germany) J Jahn	6^{2}	7^{7}	3
(Republic of Ireland) J McGee	7^{7}	6^{3}	6

Quarterfinals
Q	(Belarus) E Gerasimov	7	7^{8}
(Switzerland) M Chiudinelli	5	6^{6}
WC	(France) C Moutet	2	7^{9}	7^{7}
(Republic of Ireland) J McGee	6	6^{7}	6^{5}

Semifinals
Q	(Belarus) E Gerasimov	4	6	6
WC	(France) C Moutet	6	4	3

=== Bottom half ===
First round
6	(France) K de Schepper	6	6
WC	(France) E Furness	2	2
(Germany) Marc Sieber	2	3
(France) G Sakharov	6	6
(France) M Janvier	6	4	6
(Bosnia and Herzegovina) A Šetkić	3	6	4
(Croatia) F Škugor	2	3
4	(Slovakia) L Lacko	6	6
8	(Germany) T Kamke	6	6
(Czech Republic) Petr Michnev	1	0
(United Kingdom) E Corrie	6^{4}	1
Q	(Germany) O Otte	7^{7}	6
(Belgium) M Authom	4	5
(Belgium) Y Reuter	6	7
WC	(France) E Couacaud	4	4
2	(Ukraine) S Stakhovsky	6	6

Second round
6	(France) K de Schepper	4	6^{4}
(France) G Sakharov	6	7^{7}
(France) M Janvier	0	5
4	(Slovakia) L Lacko	6	7
8	(Germany) T Kamke	6	7^{7}
Q	(Germany) O Otte	2	6^{5}
(Belgium) Y Reuter	1	1
2	(Ukraine) S Stakhovsky	6	6

Quarterfinals
(France) G Sakharov	6	7^{7}
4	(Slovakia) L Lacko	2	6^{3}
8	(Germany) T Kamke	7	6
2	(Ukraine) S Stakhovsky	5	3

Semifinals
(France) G Sakharov	6^{4}	6	0
8	(Germany) T Kamke	7^{7}	4	6
