= 2017 Open Harmonie mutuelle – Doubles =

Doubles
- 2017 Open Harmonie mutuelle

Final
- Champions: (Germany) Andre Begemann (Denmark) Frederik Nielsen
- Runners-up: (Republic of Ireland) David O'Hare (United Kingdom) Joe Salisbury
- Score: 6–3, 6–4

Events
Singles	Doubles
← 2016 ·	Open Harmonie mutuelle	· 2018 →

Rameez Junaid and Andreas Siljeström were the defending champions but only Junaid chose to defend his title, partnering Tim Pütz, but withdrew before the tournament began.

Andre Begemann and Frederik Nielsen won the title after defeating David O'Hare and Joe Salisbury 6–3, 6–4 in the final.

== Seeds ==
1. (Croatia) Antonio Šančić / (Belarus) Andrei Vasilevski (semifinals)
2. (United Kingdom) Ken Skupski / (United Kingdom) Neal Skupski (quarterfinals)
3. (Czech Republic) Roman Jebavý / (Slovakia) Igor Zelenay (first round)
4. (Germany) Andre Begemann / (Denmark) Frederik Nielsen (champions)

== Draw ==
=== Key ===
- Q = Qualifier
- WC = Wild card
- LL = Lucky loser
- Alt = Alternate
- SE = Special exempt
- PR = Protected ranking
- ITF = ITF entry
- JE = Junior exempt
- w/o = Walkover
- r = Retired
- d = Defaulted
- SR = Special ranking

First round
1	(Croatia) A Šančić (Belarus) A Vasilevski	6	6
WC	(Belgium) M Authom (France) G Sakharov	3	3
(Netherlands) D Pel (Belgium) J Vliegen	6^{4}	6	[10]
Alt	(Czech Republic) Petr Michnev (Spain) R Ramírez Hidalgo	7^{7}	4	[8]
4	(Germany) A Begemann (Denmark) F Nielsen	4	6	[10]
(France) G Jacq (France) H Nys	6	3	[6]
(Russia) A Kudryavtsev (Bosnia and Herzegovina) A Šetkić	2	1
WC	(France) E Couacaud (France) Q Halys	6	6
(Croatia) M Draganja (Croatia) T Draganja	7^{9}	4	[6]
(Germany) O Otte (Croatia) F Škugor	6^{7}	6	[10]
(Slovakia) L Lacko (Ukraine) S Stakhovsky	6	4	[10]
3	(Czech Republic) R Jebavý (Slovakia) I Zelenay	4	6	[5]
WC	(France) R Boutillier (France) E Furness	4	5
(Republic of Ireland) D O'Hare (United Kingdom) J Salisbury	6	7
(Switzerland) M Chiudinelli (Austria) J Knowle	6	4	[4]
2	(United Kingdom) K Skupski (United Kingdom) N Skupski	3	6	[10]

Quarterfinals
1	(Croatia) A Šančić (Belarus) A Vasilevski	7^{7}	2	[10]
(Netherlands) D Pel (Belgium) J Vliegen	6^{5}	6	[5]
4	(Germany) A Begemann (Denmark) F Nielsen	w/o
WC	(France) E Couacaud (France) Q Halys
(Germany) O Otte (Croatia) F Škugor	7^{7}	6
(Slovakia) L Lacko (Ukraine) S Stakhovsky	6^{5}	1
(Republic of Ireland) D O'Hare (United Kingdom) J Salisbury	6	6
2	(United Kingdom) K Skupski (United Kingdom) N Skupski	3	3

Semifinals
1	(Croatia) A Šančić (Belarus) A Vasilevski	4	3
4	(Germany) A Begemann (Denmark) F Nielsen	6	6
(Germany) O Otte (Croatia) F Škugor	2	3
(Republic of Ireland) D O'Hare (United Kingdom) J Salisbury	6	6

Final
4	(Germany) A Begemann (Denmark) F Nielsen	6	6
(Republic of Ireland) D O'Hare (United Kingdom) J Salisbury	3	4
