= 2022 Open Harmonie mutuelle – Singles =

Singles
- 2022 Open Harmonie mutuelle

Final
- Champion: (United Kingdom) Jack Draper
- Runner-up: (Belgium) Zizou Bergs
- Score: 6–2, 5–7, 6–4

Events
Singles	Doubles
← 2019 ·	Open Harmonie mutuelle	· 2023 →

Kamil Majchrzak was the defending champion but chose not to defend his title.

Jack Draper won the title after defeating Zizou Bergs 6–2, 5–7, 6–4 in the final.

== Seeds ==
1. (Lithuania) Ričardas Berankis (withdrew)
2. (France) Quentin Halys (semifinals)
3. (France) Gilles Simon (first round)
4. Roman Safiullin (second round, withdrew)
5. (United Kingdom) Jack Draper (champion)
6. (France) Grégoire Barrère (first round)
7. (France) Constant Lestienne (first round, retired)
8. (France) Antoine Hoang (second round)

== Draw ==
=== Key ===
- Q = Qualifier
- WC = Wild card
- LL = Lucky loser
- Alt = Alternate
- SE = Special exempt
- PR = Protected ranking
- ITF = ITF entry
- JE = Junior exempt
- w/o = Walkover
- r = Retired
- d = Defaulted
- SR = Special ranking

=== Finals ===
Semifinals
(France) Antoine Escoffier	2	6	0
5	(United Kingdom) Jack Draper	6	0	6
Q	(Belgium) Zizou Bergs	3	6	6
2	(France) Quentin Halys	6	3	1

Final
5	(United Kingdom) Jack Draper	6	5	6
Q	(Belgium) Zizou Bergs	2	7	4

=== Top half ===
First round
LL	(Germany) M Rosenkranz	6	7^{7}
(Japan) G Soeda	2	6^{4}
(France) A Escoffier	7^{7}	7^{7}
(France) M Janvier	6^{2}	6^{4}
Q	(Hungary) F Marozsán	3	4
(United Kingdom) R Peniston	6	6
WC	(France) L Van Assche	7^{7}	2	4
8	(France) A Hoang	6^{5}	6	6
3	(France) G Simon	7^{7}	6^{5}	5
E Karlovskiy	6^{5}	7^{7}	7
(France) E Furness	6	6
(Netherlands) J Sels	3	2
(Netherlands) R Haase	7	7
WC	(France) A Fils	5	5
(Ukraine) I Marchenko	3	6^{3}
5	(United Kingdom) J Draper	6	7^{7}

Second round
LL	(Germany) M Rosenkranz	5	1
(France) A Escoffier	7	6
(United Kingdom) R Peniston	6	6^{6}	6
8	(France) A Hoang	1	7^{8}	3
E Karlovskiy	4	5
(France) E Furness	6	7
(Netherlands) R Haase	2	3
5	(United Kingdom) J Draper	6	6

Quarterfinals
(France) A Escoffier	6	1	6
(United Kingdom) R Peniston	2	6	1
(France) E Furness	2	1
5	(United Kingdom) J Draper	6	6

Semifinals
(France) A Escoffier	2	6	0
5	(United Kingdom) J Draper	6	0	6

=== Bottom half ===
First round
7	(France) C Lestienne	2^{r}
LL	(Germany) B Hassan	3
Alt	(Tunisia) M Jaziri	1	3
(Japan) H Moriya	6	6
Q	(Belgium) Z Bergs	6	6
LL	(Greece) M Pervolarakis	3	1
Q	(Canada) A Galarneau	6^{5}	6^{2}
4	R Safiullin	7^{7}	7^{7}
6	(France) G Barrère	4	2
(Croatia) B Gojo	6	6
WC	(France) H Mayot	3	6	4
Q	(United Kingdom) A Gray	6	4	6
Alt	(Denmark) M Torpegaard	6	6^{9}	3
Q	(Germany) H Squire	4	7^{11}	6
(France) T Lamasine	2	2
2	(France) Q Halys	6	6

Second round
LL	(Germany) B Hassan	7	3	6
(Japan) H Moriya	5	6	4
Q	(Belgium) Z Bergs	w/o
4	R Safiullin
(Croatia) B Gojo	1	6^{6}
Q	(United Kingdom) A Gray	6	7^{8}
Q	(Germany) H Squire	4	6^{2}
2	(France) Q Halys	6	7^{7}

Quarterfinals
LL	(Germany) B Hassan
Q	(Belgium) Z Bergs	w/o
Q	(United Kingdom) A Gray	3	5
2	(France) Q Halys	6	7

Semifinals
Q	(Belgium) Z Bergs	3	6	6
2	(France) Q Halys	6	3	1
