= 2015 Open Harmonie mutuelle =

- Date: 6 April – 12 April
- Edition: 12th
- Draw: 32S / 16D
- Prize money: €35,000+H
- Surface: Hard
- Location: Saint-Brieuc, France

Champions

Singles
- (France) Nicolas Mahut

Doubles
- (France) Grégoire Burquier / (France) Alexandre Sidorenko
← 2014 ·	Saint-Brieuc Challenger	· 2016 →

The 2015 Open Harmonie mutuelle was a professional tennis tournament played on hard courts. It was the twelfth edition of the tournament which was part of the 2015 ATP Challenger Tour. It took place in Saint-Brieuc, France between 6 April and 12 April 2015.

== Singles main-draw entrants ==
=== Seeds ===
Country	Player	Rank^{1}	Seed
FRA	Lucas Pouille	114	1
GER	Andreas Beck	116	2
FRA	Nicolas Mahut	124	3
NED	Igor Sijsling	132	4
JPN	Yūichi Sugita	147	5
CZE	Jan Hernych	178	6
FRA	David Guez	191	7
GBR	Edward Corrie	218	8

- Rankings are as of March 23, 2015.

=== Other entrants ===
The following players received wildcards into the singles main draw:

- (France) Grégoire Barrère
- (France) Grégoire Burquier
- (France) Quentin Halys
- (France) Laurent Rochette

The following players received entry from the qualifying draw:

- (Germany) Richard Becker
- (France) Constant Lestienne
- (France) Hugo Nys
- (United Kingdom) Marcus Willis

== Doubles main-draw entrants ==
=== Seeds ===
Country	Player	Country	Player	Rank	Seed
NED	Wesley Koolhof	NED	Matwé Middelkoop	324	1
PHI	Ruben Gonzales	GBR	Darren Walsh	345	2
GER	Andreas Beck	GBR	Ken Skupski	369	3
POL	Andriej Kapaś	JPN	Yasutaka Uchiyama	390	4

=== Other entrants ===
The following pairs received wildcards into the doubles main draw:

- (France) Grégoire Barrère / (France) Marc Gicquel
- (France) Rémi Boutillier / (France) Quentin Halys
- (France) Grégoire Burquier / (France) Alexandre Sidorenko

== Champions ==
=== Singles ===
- (France) Nicolas Mahut def. (Japan) Yūichi Sugita, 3–6, 7–6^{(7–3)}, 6–4

=== Doubles ===
- (France) Grégoire Burquier / (France) Alexandre Sidorenko def. (Poland) Andriej Kapaś / (Japan) Yasutaka Uchiyama, 6–3, 6–4
