= 2015 Open Harmonie mutuelle – Doubles =

Doubles
- 2015 Open Harmonie mutuelle

Final
- Champions: (France) Grégoire Burquier (France) Alexandre Sidorenko
- Runners-up: (Poland) Andriej Kapaś (Japan) Yasutaka Uchiyama
- Score: 6–3, 6–4

Events
Singles	Doubles
← 2014 ·	Open Harmonie mutuelle	· 2016 →

Dominik Meffert and Tim Pütz were the defending champions, but decided not to compete.

Grégoire Burquier and Alexandre Sidorenko won the title, defeating Andriej Kapaś and Yasutaka Uchiyama in the final, 6–3, 6–4.

== Seeds ==
1. (Netherlands) Wesley Koolhof / (Netherlands) Matwé Middelkoop (quarterfinals)
2. (Philippines) Ruben Gonzales / (United Kingdom) Darren Walsh (semifinals)
3. (Germany) Andreas Beck / (United Kingdom) Ken Skupski (first round)
4. (Poland) Andriej Kapaś / (Japan) Yasutaka Uchiyama (final)

== Draw ==
=== Key ===
- Q = Qualifier
- WC = Wild card
- LL = Lucky loser
- Alt = Alternate
- SE = Special exempt
- PR = Protected ranking
- ITF = ITF entry
- JE = Junior exempt
- w/o = Walkover
- r = Retired
- d = Defaulted
- SR = Special ranking

=== Draw ===
First round
1	(Netherlands) W Koolhof (Netherlands) M Middelkoop	w/o
(United Kingdom) D Cox (United Kingdom) M Willis
(Belgium) J Cagnina (Belgium) G Gigounon	6	6^{5}	[10]
(Republic of Ireland) J Cluskey (Republic of Ireland) D O'Hare	2	7^{7}	2
3	(Germany) A Beck (United Kingdom) K Skupski	3	6	[7]
WC	(France) G Barrère (France) M Gicquel	6	1	[10]
(Czech Republic) J Hernych (Czech Republic) J Mertl	6	6^{2}	[10]
WC	(France) G Burquier (France) A Sidorenko	3	7^{7}	[12]
Alt	(Croatia) T Androić (Croatia) N Mektić	w/o
(Belgium) Y Mertens (Netherlands) I Sijsling
(Belarus) U Ignatik (Czech Republic) M Michalička	5	2
4	(Poland) A Kapaś (Japan) Y Uchiyama	6	7
(Romania) P Grigoriu (Romania) C Pavăl	6	2	[10]
(Netherlands) J Huta Galung (Japan) Y Sugita	2	6	[5]
WC	(France) R Boutillier (France) Q Halys	2	6^{6}
2	(Philippines) R Gonzales (United Kingdom) D Walsh	6	7^{8}

Quarterfinals
1	(Netherlands) W Koolhof (Netherlands) M Middelkoop	6	4	[9]
(Belgium) J Cagnina (Belgium) G Gigounon	1	6	[11]
WC	(France) G Barrère (France) M Gicquel	6^{4}	4
WC	(France) G Burquier (France) A Sidorenko	7^{7}	6
Alt	(Croatia) T Androić (Croatia) N Mektić	6	3	[8]
4	(Poland) A Kapaś (Japan) Y Uchiyama	1	6	[10]
(Romania) P Grigoriu (Romania) C Pavăl	3	4
2	(Philippines) R Gonzales (United Kingdom) D Walsh	6	6

Semifinals
(Belgium) J Cagnina (Belgium) G Gigounon	3	3
WC	(France) G Burquier (France) A Sidorenko	6	6
4	(Poland) A Kapaś (Japan) Y Uchiyama	6	7
2	(Philippines) R Gonzales (United Kingdom) D Walsh	2	5

Final
WC	(France) G Burquier (France) A Sidorenko	6	6
4	(Poland) A Kapaś (Japan) Y Uchiyama	3	4
