= 2015 Open Harmonie mutuelle – Singles =

Singles
- 2015 Open Harmonie mutuelle

Final
- Champion: (France) Nicolas Mahut
- Runner-up: (Japan) Yūichi Sugita
- Score: 3–6, 7–6^{(7–3)}, 6–4

Events
Singles	Doubles
← 2014 ·	Open Harmonie mutuelle	· 2016 →

Andreas Beck was the defending champion, but lost in the second round.

Nicolas Mahut won the title, defeating Yūichi Sugita in the final, 3–6, 7–6^{(7–3)}, 6–4.

== Seeds ==
1. (France) Lucas Pouille (semifinals)
2. (Germany) Andreas Beck (second round)
3. (France) Nicolas Mahut (champion)
4. (Netherlands) Igor Sijsling (first round)
5. (Japan) Yūichi Sugita (final)
6. (Czech Republic) Jan Hernych (second round)
7. (France) David Guez (first round)
8. (United Kingdom) Edward Corrie (first round)

== Draw ==
=== Key ===
- Q = Qualifier
- WC = Wild card
- LL = Lucky loser
- Alt = Alternate
- SE = Special exempt
- PR = Protected ranking
- ITF = ITF entry
- JE = Junior exempt
- w/o = Walkover
- r = Retired
- d = Defaulted
- SR = Special ranking

=== Finals ===
Semifinals
1	(France) Lucas Pouille	5	4
3	(France) Nicolas Mahut	7	6
Q	(France) Constant Lestienne	4	2
5	(Japan) Yūichi Sugita	6	6

Final
3	(France) Nicolas Mahut	3	7^{7}	6
5	(Japan) Yūichi Sugita	6	6^{3}	4

=== Top half ===
First round
1	(France) L Pouille	7	3	7^{7}
WC	(France) Q Halys	5	6	6^{4}
(Belgium) G Gigounon	6^{4}	2
(Czech Republic) M Michalička	7^{7}	6
(Japan) Y Uchiyama	1	3
(Croatia) N Mektić	6	6
(Czech Republic) J Mertl	7	6^{2}	6
8	(United Kingdom) E Corrie	5	7	3
3	(France) N Mahut	6	7^{7}
Q	(Germany) R Becker	4	6^{5}
(Serbia) P Krstin	1	2
(Switzerland) Y Marti	6	6
(France) Jules Marie	6	6
(Belgium) J Cagnina	2	3
(France) R Boutillier	6	3	7^{7}
7	(France) D Guez	2	6	6^{1}

Second round
1	(France) L Pouille	6	3	6
(Czech Republic) M Michalička	4	6	3
(Croatia) N Mektić	4	6	6
(Czech Republic) J Mertl	6	3	4
3	(France) N Mahut	6	6
(Switzerland) Y Marti	3	0
(France) J Marie	4	2
(France) R Boutillier	6	6

Quarterfinals
1	(France) L Pouille	6	6
(Croatia) N Mektić	2	4
3	(France) N Mahut	7^{7}	5	7^{7}
(France) R Boutillier	6^{2}	7	6^{5}

Semifinals
1	(France) L Pouille	5	4
3	(France) N Mahut	7	6

=== Bottom half ===
First round
6	(Czech Republic) J Hernych	6	6
WC	(France) G Burquier	4	4
Q	(France) C Lestienne	6	3	6
WC	(France) G Barrère	2	6	3
(France) M Vaïsse	4	2
(France) V Millot	6	6
(Belarus) U Ignatik	2	6	6
4	(Netherlands) I Sijsling	6	4	4
5	(Japan) Y Sugita	6	3
Q	(United Kingdom) M Willis	4	0^{r}
Q	(France) H Nys	4	5
(Belgium) Y Mertens	6	7
(Denmark) F Nielsen	3	6^{5}
(Netherlands) J Huta Galung	6	7^{7}
WC	(France) Laurent Rochette	1	7^{7}	5
2	(Germany) A Beck	6	6^{2}	7

Second round
6	(Czech Republic) J Hernych	6	4	1
Q	(France) C Lestienne	4	6	6
(France) V Millot	7	6
(Belarus) U Ignatik	5	1
5	(Japan) Y Sugita	6	6
(Belgium) Y Mertens	0	3
(Netherlands) J Huta Galung	6	6
2	(Germany) A Beck	3	4

Quarterfinals
Q	(France) C Lestienne	6	6
(France) V Millot	1	4
5	(Japan) Y Sugita	5
(Netherlands) J Huta Galung	3^{r}

Semifinals
Q	(France) C Lestienne	4	2
5	(Japan) Y Sugita	6	6
