= 2014 Open Harmonie mutuelle – Doubles =

Doubles
- 2014 Open Harmonie mutuelle

Final
- Champions: (Germany) Dominik Meffert; (Germany) Tim Pütz
- Runners-up: (Russia) Victor Baluda; (Germany) Philipp Marx
- Score: 6–4, 6–3

Events
Singles	Doubles
← 2013 ·	Open Harmonie mutuelle	· 2015 →

Tomasz Bednarek and Andreas Siljeström were the defending champions, but decided not to compete.

Dominik Meffert and Tim Pütz won the title, defeating Victor Baluda and Philipp Marx in the final, 6–4, 6–3.

== Seeds ==
1. (United Kingdom) Ken Skupski / (United Kingdom) Neal Skupski (semifinals)
2. (Australia) Rameez Junaid / (Poland) Mateusz Kowalczyk (quarterfinals)
3. (Russia) Victor Baluda / (Germany) Philipp Marx (final)
4. (Germany) Dominik Meffert / (Germany) Tim Pütz (champions)

== Draw ==
=== Key ===
- Q = Qualifier
- WC = Wild card
- LL = Lucky loser
- Alt = Alternate
- SE = Special exempt
- PR = Protected ranking
- ITF = ITF entry
- JE = Junior exempt
- w/o = Walkover
- r = Retired
- d = Defaulted
- SR = Special ranking

=== Draw ===
First round

Quarterfinals

Semifinals

Final

1
- (United Kingdom) K Skupski
- (United Kingdom) N Skupski
6
6

- (United States) Adham El-Effendi
- (United Kingdom) D Walsh
4
1

1
- (United Kingdom) K Skupski
- (United Kingdom) N Skupski
6
6

- (Croatia) T Androić
- (Slovakia) M Mečíř
6
7^{7}

- (Croatia) T Androić
- (Slovakia) M Mečíř
3
2

WC
- (France) Raphael Jannel
- (France) A Mannarino
3
6^{2}

1
- (United Kingdom) K Skupski
- (United Kingdom) N Skupski
6
5
[5]

4
- (Germany) D Meffert
- (Germany) T Pütz
6
6

4
- (Germany) D Meffert
- (Germany) T Pütz
4
7
[10]

- (Russia) K Kravchuk
- (Russia) A Kudryavtsev
4
1

4
- (Germany) D Meffert
- (Germany) T Pütz
7^{11}
7

- (United Kingdom) D Rice
- (United Kingdom) S Thornley
6
6

- (United Kingdom) D Rice
- (United Kingdom) S Thornley
6^{9}
5

WC
- (France) G Jacq
- (France) G Sakharov
1
2

4
- (Germany) D Meffert
- (Germany) T Pütz
6
6

WC
- (France) T Lamasine
- (France) H Nys
6
6

3
- (Russia) V Baluda
- (Germany) P Marx
4
3

- (France) G Burquier
- (France) M Rodrigues
2
3

WC
- (France) T Lamasine
- (France) H Nys
7^{7}
2
[7]

- (Germany) A Beck
- (Germany) B Phau
6
4
[6]

3
- (Russia) V Baluda
- (Germany) P Marx
6^{3}
6
[10]

3
- (Russia) V Baluda
- (Germany) P Marx
2
6
[10]

3
- (Russia) V Baluda
- (Germany) P Marx
6
3
[10]

- (United Kingdom) L Burton
- (United Kingdom) M Willis
6
6

- (United Kingdom) L Burton
- (United Kingdom) M Willis
4
6
[6]

- (Netherlands) S Fransen
- (Netherlands) W Koolhof
4
2

- (United Kingdom) L Burton
- (United Kingdom) M Willis
6
2
[11]

- (Croatia) N Mektić
- (Italy) A Motti
6^{4}
3

2
- (Australia) R Junaid
- (Poland) M Kowalczyk
3
6
[9]

2
- (Australia) R Junaid
- (Poland) M Kowalczyk
7^{7}
6
