= 2022 Open Harmonie mutuelle =

- Date: 28 March–4 April
- Edition: 17th
- Surface: Hard (indoor)
- Location: Saint-Brieuc, France

Champions

Singles
- (United Kingdom) Jack Draper

Doubles
- (Netherlands) Sander Arends / (Netherlands) David Pel
← 2019 ·	Open Harmonie mutuelle	· 2023 →

The 2022 Open Harmonie mutuelle was a professional tennis tournament played on hard courts. It was the seventeenth edition of the tournament which was part of the 2022 ATP Challenger Tour. It took place in Saint-Brieuc, France between 28 March and 4 April 2022.

== Singles main-draw entrants ==
=== Seeds ===
Country	Player	Rank^{1}	Seed
~~LTU~~	~~Ričardas Berankis~~	~~87~~	~~1~~
FRA	Quentin Halys	115	2
FRA	Gilles Simon	139	3
	Roman Safiullin	143	4
GBR	Jack Draper	146	5
FRA	Grégoire Barrère	178	6
FRA	Constant Lestienne	205	7
FRA	Antoine Hoang	214	8

- Rankings are as of 21 March 2022.

=== Other entrants ===
The following players received wildcards into the singles main draw:

- (France) Arthur Fils
- (France) Harold Mayot
- (France) Luca Van Assche

The following players received entry into the singles main draw as alternates:

- (Tunisia) Malek Jaziri
- (Denmark) Mikael Torpegaard

The following players received entry from the qualifying draw:

- (Belgium) Zizou Bergs
- (Canada) Alexis Galarneau
- (United Kingdom) Alastair Gray
- (Hungary) Fábián Marozsán
- (Germany) ~~Marvin Möller~~
- (Germany) Henri Squire

The following players received entry as lucky losers:

- (Germany) Benjamin Hassan
- (Greece) Michail Pervolarakis
- (Germany) Mats Rosenkranz

== Champions ==
=== Singles ===
- (United Kingdom) Jack Draper def. (Belgium) Zizou Bergs 6–2, 5–7, 6–4.

=== Doubles ===
- (Netherlands) Sander Arends / (Netherlands) David Pel def. (France) Jonathan Eysseric / (Netherlands) Robin Haase 6–3, 6–3.
