= 2016 Open Harmonie mutuelle – Doubles =

Doubles
- 2016 Open Harmonie mutuelle

Final
- Champions: (Australia) Rameez Junaid (Sweden) Andreas Siljeström
- Runners-up: (United States) James Cerretani (Netherlands) Antal van der Duim
- Score: 5–7, 7–6^{(7–4)}, [10–8]

Events
Singles	Doubles
- Open Harmonie mutuelle

Grégoire Burquier and Alexandre Sidorenko were the defending champions, but only Sidorenko chose to defend his title partnering Axel Michon. Sidorenko lost to Ivan and Matej Sabanov in the first round.

Rameez Junaid and Andreas Siljeström won the title after defeating James Cerretani and Antal van der Duim 5–7, 7–6^{(7–4)}, [10–8] in the final.

== Seeds ==
1. (Australia) Rameez Junaid / (Sweden) Andreas Siljeström (champions)
2. (Germany) Frank Moser / (Germany) Alexander Satschko (first round)
3. (India) Mahesh Bhupathi / (United Kingdom) Jonathan Marray (quarterfinals)
4. (Poland) Mateusz Kowalczyk / (Poland) Adam Majchrowicz (quarterfinals)

== Draw ==
Key

- Q = Qualifier
- WC = Wild card
- LL = Lucky loser
- Alt = Alternate
- ITF = ITF entry
- PR = Protected ranking
- SR = Special ranking
- SE = Special exempt
- JE = Junior exempt
- JR = Junior Accelerator Programme entrant
- CO = College Accelerator Programme entrant
- NG = Next Gen Accelerator Program entrant
- w/o = Walkover
- r = Retired
- d = Defaulted

First round
1	(Australia) R Junaid (Sweden) A Siljeström	6	6^{4}	[10]
WC	(France) M Gicquel (France) D Guez	1	7^{7}	[7]
(France) A Michon (France) A Sidorenko	3	2
(Croatia) I Sabanov (Croatia) M Sabanov	6	6
4	(Poland) M Kowalczyk (Poland) A Majchrowicz	6	6
(Russia) A Karatsev (France) C Lestienne	3	3
WC	(Belgium) M Authom (France) J Eysseric	5	6	[10]
WC	(France) H Nys (France) M Teixeira	7	3	[5]
(Netherlands) S Arends (Portugal) G Oliveira	6	4	[3]
(Germany) T Kamke (Austria) T-S Weissborn	4	6	[10]
Alt	(Italy) L Giustino (India) R Ramanathan	5	2
3	(India) M Bhupathi (United Kingdom) J Marray	6	6
(France) G Barrère (France) Q Halys	4	4
(Belgium) Y Mertens (Netherlands) I Sijsling	6	6
(United States) J Cerretani (Netherlands) A van der Duim	6	6
2	(Germany) F Moser (Germany) A Satschko	4	4

Quarterfinals
1	(Australia) R Junaid (Sweden) A Siljeström	6	6^{5}	[10]
(Croatia) I Sabanov (Croatia) M Sabanov	4	7^{7}	[6]
4	(Poland) M Kowalczyk (Poland) A Majchrowicz	5	5
WC	(Belgium) M Authom (France) J Eysseric	7	7
(Germany) T Kamke (Austria) T-S Weissborn	6^{2}	6	[10]
3	(India) M Bhupathi (United Kingdom) J Marray	7^{7}	2	[5]
(Belgium) Y Mertens (Netherlands) I Sijsling	4	3
(United States) J Cerretani (Netherlands) A van der Duim	6	6

Semifinals
1	(Australia) R Junaid (Sweden) A Siljeström	6	1	[10]
WC	(Belgium) M Authom (France) J Eysseric	4	6	[8]
(Germany) T Kamke (Austria) T-S Weissborn	5	3
(United States) J Cerretani (Netherlands) A van der Duim	7	6

Final
1	(Australia) R Junaid (Sweden) A Siljeström	5	7^{7}	[10]
(United States) J Cerretani (Netherlands) A van der Duim	7	6^{4}	[8]
