= 2026 Open Saint-Brieuc – Doubles =

Doubles
- 2026 Open Saint-Brieuc

Final
- Champions: (Switzerland) Jakub Paul (Czech Republic) Matěj Vocel
- Runners-up: (France) Arthur Reymond (France) Luca Sanchez
- Score: 6–7^{(4–7)}, 7–6^{(7–2)}, [10–5]

Events
Singles	Doubles
- Open Saint-Brieuc

Geoffrey Blancaneaux and Gabriel Debru were the defending champions when the tournament was last held in 2024, but only Blancaneaux chose to defend his title, partnering Clément Tabur. They lost in the first round to Arthur Reymond and Luca Sanchez.

Jakub Paul and Matěj Vocel won the title after defeating Reymond and Sanchez 6–7^{(4–7)}, 7–6^{(7–2)}, [10–5] in the final.

== Seeds ==
1. (Switzerland) Jakub Paul / (Czech Republic) Matěj Vocel (champions)
2. (United Kingdom) Joshua Paris / (United Kingdom) Marcus Willis (semifinals)
3. (France) Arthur Reymond / (France) Luca Sanchez (final)
4. (Canada) Cleeve Harper / (United Kingdom) David Stevenson (first round)

== Draw ==
Key

- Q = Qualifier
- WC = Wild card
- LL = Lucky loser
- Alt = Alternate
- ITF = ITF entry
- PR = Protected ranking
- SR = Special ranking
- SE = Special exempt
- JE = Junior exempt
- JR = Junior Accelerator Programme entrant
- CO = College Accelerator Programme entrant
- NG = Next Gen Accelerator Program entrant
- w/o = Walkover
- r = Retired
- d = Defaulted

First round
1	(Switzerland) J Paul (Czech Republic) M Vocel	6	7^{7}
WC	(United States) K Smith (Germany) P Zahraj	4	6^{5}
I Liutarevich (Poland) F Pieczonka	3	6	[6]
(Czech Republic) A Paulson (Czech Republic) M Vrbenský	6	3	[10]
4	(Canada) C Harper (United Kingdom) D Stevenson	2	6	[7]
(India) RC Bollipalli (United States) T Winegar	6	3	[10]
(Poland) S Kielan (Romania) B Pavel	6	6
(Spain) Í Cervantes (France) G Jacq	4	3
(United States) N Lammons (United States) J Withrow	6	7
WC	(France) R Bertrand (South Africa) P Henning	4	5
(France) G Blancaneaux (France) C Tabur	7^{7}	2	[7]
3	(France) A Reymond (France) L Sanchez	6^{3}	6	[10]
(Netherlands) M Hermans (Netherlands) T Loof	1	7^{7}	[10]
(Spain) M Mansilla Díez (Spain) B Winter López	6	6^{4}	[8]
(France) U Blanchet (France) M Martineau	4	6	[6]
2	(United Kingdom) J Paris (United Kingdom) M Willis	6	3	[10]

Quarterfinals
1	(Switzerland) J Paul (Czech Republic) M Vocel	7^{7}	7^{7}
(Czech Republic) A Paulson (Czech Republic) M Vrbenský	6^{4}	6^{1}
(India) RC Bollipalli (United States) T Winegar	6	6
(Poland) S Kielan (Romania) B Pavel	3	2
(United States) N Lammons (United States) J Withrow	3	7	[8]
3	(France) A Reymond (France) L Sanchez	6	5	[10]
(Netherlands) M Hermans (Netherlands) T Loof	3	1
2	(United Kingdom) J Paris (United Kingdom) M Willis	6	6

Semifinals
1	(Switzerland) J Paul (Czech Republic) M Vocel	7^{7}	6
(India) RC Bollipalli (United States) T Winegar	6^{5}	3
3	(France) A Reymond (France) L Sanchez	7^{10}	6
2	(United Kingdom) J Paris (United Kingdom) M Willis	6^{8}	4

Final
1	(Switzerland) J Paul (Czech Republic) M Vocel	6^{4}	7^{7}	[10]
3	(France) A Reymond (France) L Sanchez	7^{7}	6^{2}	[5]
