= 2014 Open Harmonie mutuelle – Singles =

Singles
- 2014 Open Harmonie mutuelle

Final
- Champion: (Germany) Andreas Beck
- Runner-up: (France) Grégoire Burquier
- Score: 7–5, 6–3

Events
| Singles | Doubles |
| ← 2013 · | Open Harmonie mutuelle | · 2015 → |

Jesse Huta Galung was the defending champion, but decided not to compete.

Andreas Beck won the title, defeating Grégoire Burquier in the final, 7–5, 6–3.

== Seeds ==
1. (France) Adrian Mannarino (second round)
2. (Russia) Evgeny Donskoy (semifinals)
3. (Germany) Michael Berrer (quarterfinals)
4. (Slovenia) Aljaž Bedene (first round)
5. (France) Marc Gicquel (second round)
6. (France) David Guez (semifinals)
7. (France) Albano Olivetti (withdrew)
8. (Germany) Andreas Beck (champion)

== Draw ==
=== Key ===
- Q = Qualifier
- WC = Wild card
- LL = Lucky loser
- Alt = Alternate
- SE = Special exempt
- PR = Protected ranking
- ITF = ITF entry
- JE = Junior exempt
- w/o = Walkover
- r = Retired
- d = Defaulted
- SR = Special ranking

=== Finals ===
Semifinals
6 | (France) David Guez | 6 | 4 | 4
8 | (Germany) Andreas Beck | 2 | 6 | 6
(France) Grégoire Burquier | 5 | 6 | 7^{7}
2 | (Russia) Evgeny Donskoy | 7 | 3 | 6^{3}

Final
8 | (Germany) Andreas Beck | 7 | 6
(France) Grégoire Burquier | 5 | 3

=== Top half ===
First round
1 | (France) A Mannarino | 6 | 6
Q | (Germany) D Meffert | 2 | 4
(Czech Republic) J Hernych | 6 | 6
(Belgium) M Authom | 3 | 0
(Russia) K Kravchuk | 7^{9} | 3 | 6
(Switzerland) Y Marti | 6^{7} | 6 | 4
(Croatia) N Mektić | 4 | 1
6 | (France) D Guez | 6 | 6
3 | (Germany) M Berrer | 6 | 7^{7}
Q | (United Kingdom) D Rice | 3 | 6^{4}
(Slovakia) M Mečíř | 2 | 5
(Germany) T Puetz | 6 | 7
(Russia) A Kudryavtsev | 3 | 6 | 7
Q | (France) H Nys | 6 | 3 | 5
(France) F Serra | 6^{7} | 5
8 | (Germany) A Beck | 7^{9} | 7

Second round
1 | (France) A Mannarino | 6 | 3 | 4
(Czech Republic) J Hernych | 3 | 6 | 6
(Russia) K Kravchuk | 3 | 0
6 | (France) D Guez | 6 | 6
3 | (Germany) M Berrer | 7 | 7
(Germany) T Puetz | 5 | 5
(Russia) A Kudryavtsev | 6 | 3 | 4
8 | (Germany) A Beck | 2 | 6 | 6

Quarterfinals
(Czech Republic) J Hernych | 3 | 4
6 | (France) D Guez | 6 | 6
3 | (Germany) M Berrer | 3 | 0
8 | (Germany) A Beck | 6 | 6

Semifinals
6 | (France) D Guez | 6 | 4 | 4
8 | (Germany) A Beck | 2 | 6 | 6

=== Bottom half ===
First round
LL | (Slovakia) Adrian Sikora | 5 | 5
(Italy) M Viola | 7 | 7
(France) G Burquier | 6 | 4 | 6
(France) M Teixeira | 4 | 6 | 3
(France) A Michon | 3 | 4
WC | (France) Jules Marie | 6 | 6
(Germany) B Phau | 6 | 6
4 | (Slovenia) A Bedene | 4 | 3
5 | (France) M Gicquel | 5 | 6 | 6
Q | (Croatia) T Androić | 7 | 4 | 4
WC | (France) M Rodrigues | 4 | 5
WC | (France) E Couacaud | 6 | 7
(France) J Ouanna | 6 | 3
(Spain) J Checa-Calvo | 3 | 1^{r}
WC | (France) T Lamasine | 2 | 2
2 | (Russia) E Donskoy | 6 | 6

Second round
(Italy) M Viola | 6 | 3 | 5
(France) G Burquier | 3 | 6 | 7
WC | (France) J Marie | 6 | 3 | 6
(Germany) B Phau | 4 | 6 | 4
5 | (France) M Gicquel | 4 | 3
WC | (France) E Couacaud | 6 | 6
(France) J Ouanna | 2 | 5
2 | (Russia) E Donskoy | 6 | 7

Quarterfinals
(France) G Burquier | 6 | 7
WC | (France) J Marie | 4 | 5
WC | (France) E Couacaud | 3 | 6 | 6^{6}
2 | (Russia) E Donskoy | 6 | 3 | 7^{8}

Semifinals
(France) G Burquier | 5 | 6 | 7^{7}
2 | (Russia) E Donskoy | 7 | 3 | 6^{3}
