= 2022 Open Harmonie mutuelle – Doubles =

Doubles
- 2022 Open Harmonie mutuelle

Final
- Champions: (Netherlands) Sander Arends (Netherlands) David Pel
- Runners-up: (France) Jonathan Eysseric (Netherlands) Robin Haase
- Score: 6–3, 6–3

Events
Singles	Doubles
- Open Harmonie mutuelle

Jonathan Erlich and Fabrice Martin were the defending champions but chose not to defend their title.

Sander Arends and David Pel won the title after defeating Jonathan Eysseric and Robin Haase 6–3, 6–3 in the final.

== Seeds ==
1. (France) Jonathan Eysseric / (Netherlands) Robin Haase (final)
2. (Netherlands) Sander Arends / (Netherlands) David Pel (champions)
3. (Czech Republic) Marek Gengel / (Greece) Michail Pervolarakis (semifinals)
4. (Austria) Neil Oberleitner / (Austria) David Pichler (first round)

== Draw ==
Key

- Q = Qualifier
- WC = Wild card
- LL = Lucky loser
- Alt = Alternate
- ITF = ITF entry
- PR = Protected ranking
- SR = Special ranking
- SE = Special exempt
- JE = Junior exempt
- JR = Junior Accelerator Programme entrant
- CO = College Accelerator Programme entrant
- NG = Next Gen Accelerator Program entrant
- w/o = Walkover
- r = Retired
- d = Defaulted

First round
(Italy) Davide Pozzi (Italy) Augusto Virgili	3	3
WC	(France) E Furness (France) Quentin Gueydan	6	6
4	(Austria) N Oberleitner (Austria) D Pichler	7	2	[8]
(India) A Chandrasekar (India) VS Prashanth	5	6	[10]
(France) T Arribagé (France) H Mayot	4	6	[11]
WC	(France) A Bouquier (France) Martin Breysach	6	3	[9]
(Germany) H Jebens (Germany) Niklas Schell	6^{3}	2
(United Kingdom) A Gray (United Kingdom) R Peniston	7^{7}	6
(Netherlands) M Hermans (Denmark) M Torpegaard	2	4
3	(Czech Republic) M Gengel (Greece) M Pervolarakis	6	6
(Croatia) Z Babić (Bulgaria) A Donski	6	7
(France) Quentin Folliot (France) M Janvier	4	5

Quarterfinals
1	(France) J Eysseric (Netherlands) R Haase	6	6
WC	(France) E Furness (France) Q Gueydan	2	3
(India) A Chandrasekar (India) VS Prashanth	1	6	[6]
(France) T Arribagé (France) H Mayot	6	3	[10]
(United Kingdom) A Gray (United Kingdom) R Peniston	5	6	[8]
3	(Czech Republic) M Gengel (Greece) M Pervolarakis	7	2	[10]
(Croatia) Z Babić (Bulgaria) A Donski	6^{5}	3
2	(Netherlands) S Arends (Netherlands) D Pel	7^{7}	6

Semifinals
1	(France) J Eysseric (Netherlands) R Haase	7^{7}	6
(France) T Arribagé (France) H Mayot	6^{4}	3
3	(Czech Republic) M Gengel (Greece) M Pervolarakis	5	6^{2}
2	(Netherlands) S Arends (Netherlands) D Pel	7	7^{7}

Final
1	(France) J Eysseric (Netherlands) R Haase	3	3
2	(Netherlands) S Arends (Netherlands) D Pel	6	6
