= 2016 Open Harmonie mutuelle – Singles =

Singles
- 2016 Open Harmonie mutuelle

Final
- Champion: (France) Alexandre Sidorenko
- Runner-up: (Netherlands) Igor Sijsling
- Score: 2–6, 6–3, 7–6^{(7–3)}

Events
Singles	Doubles
← 2015 ·	Open Harmonie mutuelle	· 2017 →

Nicolas Mahut was the defending champion, but chose not to defend his title.

Alexandre Sidorenko won the title, defeating Igor Sijsling 2–6, 6–3, 7–6^{(7–3)} in the final.

== Seeds ==
1. (Germany) Jan-Lennard Struff (second round)
2. (United Kingdom) Daniel Evans (quarterfinals)
3. (Russia) Karen Khachanov (second round)
4. (Italy) Luca Vanni (first round)
5. (France) Vincent Millot (first round)
6. (Netherlands) Igor Sijsling (final)
7. (Belarus) Egor Gerasimov (first round)
8. (France) Quentin Halys (first round)

== Draw ==
=== Key ===
- Q = Qualifier
- WC = Wild card
- LL = Lucky loser
- Alt = Alternate
- SE = Special exempt
- PR = Protected ranking
- ITF = ITF entry
- JE = Junior exempt
- w/o = Walkover
- r = Retired
- d = Defaulted
- SR = Special ranking

=== Finals ===
Semifinals
WC	(France) Alexandre Sidorenko	3	6	6
(Kazakhstan) Aleksandr Nedovyesov	6	3	0
WC	(France) Gleb Sakharov	6	5	4
6	(Netherlands) Igor Sijsling	3	7	6

Final
WC	(France) Alexandre Sidorenko	2	6	7^{7}
6	(Netherlands) Igor Sijsling	6	3	6^{3}

=== Top half ===
First round
1	(Germany) J-L Struff	6	6
Q	(France) S Doumbia	4	4
(India) R Ramanathan	6^{7}	1
(Germany) T Kamke	7^{9}	6
WC	(France) M Teixeira	5	3
(Russia) A Karatsev	7	6
WC	(France) A Sidorenko	7^{7}	4	6
7	(Belarus) E Gerasimov	6^{4}	6	1
3	(Russia) K Khachanov	6	6
WC	(France) TK Wang	3	4
(Slovenia) G Žemlja	6^{3}	1
(Kazakhstan) A Nedovyesov	7^{7}	6
(Italy) F Gaio	3
Q	(Germany) A Beck	1^{r}
Q	(France) R Boutillier	3	6	6
8	(France) Q Halys	6	3	4

Second round
1	(Germany) J-L Struff	1	4
(Germany) T Kamke	6	6
(Russia) A Karatsev	4	2
WC	(France) A Sidorenko	6	6
3	(Russia) K Khachanov	4	3
(Kazakhstan) A Nedovyesov	6	6
(Italy) F Gaio	6	3	7^{7}
Q	(France) R Boutillier	4	6	6^{4}

Quarterfinals
(Germany) T Kamke	6	3	3
WC	(France) A Sidorenko	3	6	6
(Kazakhstan) A Nedovyesov	6	6
(Italy) F Gaio	3	1

Semifinals
WC	(France) A Sidorenko	3	6	6
(Kazakhstan) A Nedovyesov	6	3	0

=== Bottom half ===
First round
5	(France) V Millot	5	4
(France) G Barrère	7	6
(France) C Lestienne	6	7^{7}
(France) M Chazal	1	6^{2}
(Italy) L Giustino	2	4
(Belgium) G Gigounon	6	6
WC	(France) G Sakharov	6	7^{7}
4	(Italy) L Vanni	4	6^{5}
6	(Netherlands) I Sijsling	6	6
(Belgium) Y Mertens	3	2
Alt	(France) J Eysseric	5	6^{2}
(France) A Michon	7	7^{7}
(France) D Guez	6^{3}	6	6
Q	(United Kingdom) E Corrie	7^{7}	2	4
(Italy) S Caruso	6^{4}	2
2	(United Kingdom) D Evans	7^{7}	6

Second round
(France) G Barrère	6	6
(France) C Lestienne	4	3
(Belgium) G Gigounon	2	4
WC	(France) G Sakharov	6	6
6	(Netherlands) I Sijsling	6	6
(France) A Michon	0	3
(France) D Guez	3	1
2	(United Kingdom) D Evans	6	6

Quarterfinals
(France) G Barrère	4	2
WC	(France) G Sakharov	6	6
6	(Netherlands) I Sijsling	6	6^{2}	6
2	(United Kingdom) D Evans	4	7^{7}	4

Semifinals
WC	(France) G Sakharov	6	5	4
6	(Netherlands) I Sijsling	3	7	6
