= 2023 Open Saint-Brieuc – Doubles =

Doubles
- 2023 Open Saint-Brieuc

Final
- Champions: (France) Dan Added (France) Albano Olivetti
- Runners-up: (Finland) Patrik Niklas-Salminen (Netherlands) Bart Stevens
- Score: 4–6, 7–6^{(9–7)}, [10–6]

Events
Singles	Doubles
- Open Saint-Brieuc

Sander Arends and David Pel were the defending champions but only Pel chose to defend his title, partnering Jonathan Eysseric. Pel lost in the semifinals to Patrik Niklas-Salminen and Bart Stevens.

Dan Added and Albano Olivetti won the title after defeating Niklas-Salminen and Stevens 4–6, 7–6^{(9–7)}, [10–6] in the final.

== Seeds ==
1. (France) Dan Added / (France) Albano Olivetti (champions)
2. (France) Jonathan Eysseric / (Netherlands) David Pel (semifinals)
3. (Finland) Patrik Niklas-Salminen / (Netherlands) Bart Stevens (final)
4. (United Kingdom) Luke Johnson / (Netherlands) Sem Verbeek (semifinals)

== Draw ==
Key

- Q = Qualifier
- WC = Wild card
- LL = Lucky loser
- Alt = Alternate
- ITF = ITF entry
- PR = Protected ranking
- SR = Special ranking
- SE = Special exempt
- JE = Junior exempt
- JR = Junior Accelerator Programme entrant
- CO = College Accelerator Programme entrant
- NG = Next Gen Accelerator Program entrant
- w/o = Walkover
- r = Retired
- d = Defaulted

First round
1	(France) D Added (France) A Olivetti	7	6^{5}	[12]
WC	(France) M Bourgue (France) C Hemery	5	7^{7}	[10]
(Netherlands) M Hermans (Netherlands) M Veldheer	7^{8}	6^{0}	[5]
WC	(France) S Gueymard Wayenburg (France) A Hoang	6^{6}	7^{7}	[10]
4	(United Kingdom) L Johnson (Netherlands) S Verbeek	6	5	[10]
(France) K Jacquet (France) H Mayot	3	7	[5]
(France) C Chidekh (France) L Sanchez	6	6^{5}	[8]
(Czech Republic) J Forejtek (Ukraine) V Sachko	1	7^{7}	[10]
(Australia) T Fancutt (Australia) L Tu	6	3	[8]
(United Kingdom) C Broom (Bulgaria) A Donski	3	6	[10]
(France) E Furness (France) G Jacq	4	0
3	(Finland) P Niklas-Salminen (Netherlands) B Stevens	6	6
(France) C Bittoun Kouzmine (Italy) Davide Pozzi	5	1
(United Kingdom) S Duncan (United Kingdom) M Willis	7	6
(Australia) A Taylor (Australia) J Taylor	3	2
2	(France) J Eysseric (Netherlands) D Pel	6	6

Quarterfinals
1	(France) D Added (France) A Olivetti	6	6
WC	(France) S Gueymard Wayenburg (France) A Hoang	3	4
4	(United Kingdom) L Johnson (Netherlands) S Verbeek	6	7
(Czech Republic) J Forejtek (Ukraine) V Sachko	3	5
(United Kingdom) C Broom (Bulgaria) A Donski	0	1
3	(Finland) P Niklas-Salminen (Netherlands) B Stevens	6	6
(United Kingdom) S Duncan (United Kingdom) M Willis	4	4
2	(France) J Eysseric (Netherlands) D Pel	6	6

Semifinals
1	(France) D Added (France) A Olivetti	6	3	[10]
4	(United Kingdom) L Johnson (Netherlands) S Verbeek	3	6	[5]
3	(Finland) P Niklas-Salminen (Netherlands) B Stevens	6	6
2	(France) J Eysseric (Netherlands) D Pel	4	2

Final
1	(France) D Added (France) A Olivetti	4	7^{9}	[10]
3	(Finland) P Niklas-Salminen (Netherlands) B Stevens	6	6^{7}	[6]
