= 2016 Open Harmonie mutuelle =

- Date: 28 March – 3 April
- Edition: 13th
- Draw: 32S / 16D
- Prize money: €35,000+H
- Surface: Hard
- Location: Saint-Brieuc, France

Champions

Singles
- (France) Alexandre Sidorenko

Doubles
- (Australia) Rameez Junaid / (Sweden) Andreas Siljeström
← 2015 ·	Open Harmonie mutuelle	· 2017 →

The 2016 Open Harmonie mutuelle was a professional tennis tournament played on hard courts. It was the thirteenth edition of the tournament which was part of the 2016 ATP Challenger Tour. It took place in Saint-Brieuc, France between 28 March and 3 April 2016.

== Singles main-draw entrants ==
=== Seeds ===
Country	Player	Rank^{1}	Seed
GER	Jan-Lennard Struff	109	1
GBR	Daniel Evans	125	2
RUS	Karen Khachanov	136	3
ITA	Luca Vanni	143	4
FRA	Vincent Millot	155	5
NED	Igor Sijsling	157	6
BLR	Egor Gerasimov	177	7
FRA	Quentin Halys	179	8

- Rankings are as of March 21, 2016.

=== Other entrants ===
The following players received wildcards into the singles main draw:

- (France) Gleb Sakharov
- (France) Alexandre Sidorenko
- (France) Maxime Teixeira
- (France) Tak Khunn Wang

The following players received entry as an alternate:

- (France) Jonathan Eysseric

The following players received entry from the qualifying draw:

- (Germany) Andreas Beck
- (France) Rémi Boutillier
- (United Kingdom) Edward Corrie
- (France) Sadio Doumbia

== Champions ==
=== Singles ===
- (France) Alexandre Sidorenko def. (Netherlands) Igor Sijsling, 2–6, 6–3, 7–6^{(7–3)}

=== Doubles ===
- (Australia) Rameez Junaid / (Sweden) Andreas Siljeström def. (United States) James Cerretani / (Netherlands) Antal van der Duim, 5–7, 7–6^{(7–4)}, [10–8]
