= 2019 Open Harmonie mutuelle – Doubles =

Doubles
- 2019 Open Harmonie mutuelle

Final
- Champions: (Israel) Jonathan Erlich (France) Fabrice Martin
- Runners-up: (France) Jonathan Eysseric (Croatia) Antonio Šančić
- Score: 7–6^{(7–2)}, 7–6^{(7–2)}

Events
Singles	Doubles
- Open Harmonie mutuelle

Sander Arends and Tristan-Samuel Weissborn were the defending champions but lost in the semifinals to Jonathan Eysseric and Antonio Šančić.

Jonathan Erlich and Fabrice Martin won the title after defeating Eysseric and Šančić 7–6^{(7–2)}, 7–6^{(7–2)} in the final.

== Seeds ==
1. (Austria) Philipp Oswald / (India) Leander Paes (first round)
2. (Monaco) Romain Arneodo / (France) Hugo Nys (quarterfinals)
3. (United States) Robert Galloway / (United States) Nathaniel Lammons (first round)
4. (Israel) Jonathan Erlich / (France) Fabrice Martin (champions)

== Draw ==
Key

- Q = Qualifier
- WC = Wild card
- LL = Lucky loser
- Alt = Alternate
- ITF = ITF entry
- PR = Protected ranking
- SR = Special ranking
- SE = Special exempt
- JE = Junior exempt
- JR = Junior Accelerator Programme entrant
- CO = College Accelerator Programme entrant
- NG = Next Gen Accelerator Program entrant
- w/o = Walkover
- r = Retired
- d = Defaulted

First round
1	(Austria) P Oswald (India) L Paes	6	2	[8]
(United States) J Cerretani (Switzerland) M-A Hüsler	4	6	[10]
(Venezuela) LD Martínez (Portugal) G Oliveira	6^{2}	4
ITF	(Spain) A Artuñedo (Spain) S Martos Gornés	7^{7}	6
4	(Israel) J Erlich (France) F Martin	6	7^{7}
(Belarus) A Vasilevski (Italy) A Vavassori	3	6^{4}
(Australia) R Junaid (Netherlands) D Pel	6	6
WC	(France) E Furness (France) M Guinard	4	2
WC	(France) Q Halys (France) G Jacq	6^{3}	6^{2}
(Netherlands) S Arends (Austria) T-S Weissborn	7^{7}	7^{7}
ITF	(France) D Added (France) A Olivetti	6^{4}	6	[10]
3	(United States) R Galloway (United States) N Lammons	7^{7}	4	[8]
(France) J Eysseric (Croatia) A Šančić	6	6
(Ukraine) S Stakhovsky (Poland) S Walków	3	1
WC	(France) M Martineau (France) C Moutet	4	4
2	(Monaco) R Arneodo (France) H Nys	6	6

Quarterfinals
(United States) J Cerretani (Switzerland) M-A Hüsler	4	4
ITF	(Spain) A Artuñedo (Spain) S Martos Gornés	6	6
4	(Israel) J Erlich (France) F Martin	7^{8}	6^{7}	[10]
(Australia) R Junaid (Netherlands) D Pel	6^{6}	7^{9}	[6]
(Netherlands) S Arends (Austria) T-S Weissborn	6	7^{7}
ITF	(France) D Added (France) A Olivetti	4	6^{5}
(France) J Eysseric (Croatia) A Šančić	7^{7}	6
2	(Monaco) R Arneodo (France) H Nys	6^{4}	4

Semifinals
ITF	(Spain) A Artuñedo (Spain) S Martos Gornés	3	4
4	(Israel) J Erlich (France) F Martin	6	6
(Netherlands) S Arends (Austria) T-S Weissborn	3	5
(France) J Eysseric (Croatia) A Šančić	6	7

Final
4	(Israel) J Erlich (France) F Martin	7^{7}	7^{7}
(France) J Eysseric (Croatia) A Šančić	6^{2}	6^{2}
