= 2026 Open Saint-Brieuc – Singles =

Singles
- 2026 Open Saint-Brieuc

Final
- Champion: (Austria) Sebastian Ofner
- Runner-up: (France) Pierre-Hugues Herbert
- Score: 6–4, 7–6^{(7–4)}

Events
Singles	Doubles
- Open Saint-Brieuc

Benjamin Bonzi was the defending champion when the tournament was last held in 2024 but chose not to defend his title.

Sebastian Ofner won the title after defeating Pierre-Hugues Herbert 6–4, 7–6^{(7–4)} in the final.

== Seeds ==
1. (United Kingdom) Jacob Fearnley (first round)
2. (France) Hugo Gaston (semifinals)
3. (France) Titouan Droguet (quarterfinals)
4. (Austria) Sebastian Ofner (champion)
5. (Estonia) Mark Lajal (second round)
6. (France) Ugo Blanchet (quarterfinals)
7. (Austria) Jurij Rodionov (second round)
8. Roman Safiullin (first round)

== Draw ==
Key

- Q = Qualifier
- WC = Wild card
- LL = Lucky loser
- Alt = Alternate
- ITF = ITF entry
- PR = Protected ranking
- SR = Special ranking
- SE = Special exempt
- JE = Junior exempt
- JR = Junior Accelerator Programme entrant
- CO = College Accelerator Programme entrant
- NG = Next Gen Accelerator Program entrant
- w/o = Walkover
- r = Retired
- d = Defaulted

=== Finals ===
Semifinals
(France) Clément Chidekh	6	3	4
4	(Austria) Sebastian Ofner	3	6	6
(France) Pierre-Hugues Herbert	7	6
2	(France) Hugo Gaston	5	2

Final
4	(Austria) Sebastian Ofner	6	7^{7}
(France) Pierre-Hugues Herbert	4	6^{4}

=== Top half ===
First round
1	(United Kingdom) J Fearnley	3	2
(France) A Bouquier	6	6
Q	(France) L Lokoli	1	6	6
LL	(Switzerland) J Paul	6	4	4
(France) C Tabur	7^{7}	7^{7}
(Spain) D Rincón	6^{1}	6^{5}
(France) C Chidekh	6	6
8	R Safiullin	3	1
4	(Austria) S Ofner	6^{4}	7^{7}	6
(United Kingdom) C Broom	7^{7}	6^{5}	3
Q	(United States) K Smith	3	6^{5}
(France) G Blancaneaux	6	7^{7}
WC	(France) M Martineau	6^{5}	7^{7}	7^{7}
Q	(France) A Ghibaudo	7^{7}	6^{3}	6^{4}
(Germany) P Zahraj	3	5
7	(Austria) J Rodionov	6	7

Second round
(France) A Bouquier	4	7^{7}	2
Q	(France) L Lokoli	6	6^{4}	6
(France) C Tabur	4	3
(France) C Chidekh	6	6
4	(Austria) S Ofner	6	6
(France) G Blancaneaux	4	4
WC	(France) M Martineau	6	6
7	(Austria) J Rodionov	4	1

Quarterfinals
Q	(France) L Lokoli	3	6	4
(France) C Chidekh	6	3	6
4	(Austria) S Ofner	6	6
WC	(France) M Martineau	4	1

Semifinals
(France) C Chidekh	6	3	4
4	(Austria) S Ofner	3	6	6

=== Bottom half ===
First round
5	(Estonia) M Lajal	6	6
(Italy) J Berrettini	3	1
WC	(France) Raphael Perot	4	4
(France) P-H Herbert	6	6
Alt	(Slovakia) N Gombos	4	3
Q	(France) L Poullain	6	6
WC	(France) M Kouamé	6^{3}	4
3	(France) T Droguet	7^{7}	6
6	(France) U Blanchet	7^{7}	6^{5}	7^{10}
Q	(Germany) F Broska	6^{3}	7^{7}	6^{8}
(France) R Bertrand	3	0
Q	(Belgium) B Gadamauri	6	6
(Kazakhstan) M Kukushkin	1
(United Kingdom) G Loffhagen	0^{r}
(France) S Gueymard Wayenburg	2	4
2	(France) H Gaston	6	6

Second round
5	(Estonia) M Lajal	4	6^{1}
(France) P-H Herbert	6	7^{7}
Q	(France) L Poullain	6	2	4
3	(France) T Droguet	2	6	6
6	(France) U Blanchet	7^{7}	6
(Belgium) B Gadamauri	6^{0}	3
(Kazakhstan) M Kukushkin
2	(France) H Gaston	w/o

Quarterfinals
(France) P-H Herbert	4	6	6
3	(France) T Droguet	6	2	2
6	(France) U Blanchet	4	1
2	(France) H Gaston	6	6

Semifinals
(France) P-H Herbert	7	6
2	(France) H Gaston	5	2
