= 2023 Open Saint-Brieuc – Singles =

Singles
- 2023 Open Saint-Brieuc

Final
- Champion: (Lithuania) Ričardas Berankis
- Runner-up: (France) Dan Added
- Score: 6–3, 6–7^{(3–7)}, 7–6^{(7–5)}

Events
Singles	Doubles
- Open Saint-Brieuc

Jack Draper was the defending champion but chose not to defend his title.

Ričardas Berankis won the title after defeating Dan Added 6–3, 6–7^{(3–7)}, 7–6^{(7–5)} in the final.

== Seeds ==
1. (France) Antoine Escoffier (quarterfinals)
2. (Australia) Li Tu (first round)
3. (France) Evan Furness (semifinals)
4. (Portugal) Frederico Ferreira Silva (second round)
5. (Belgium) Gauthier Onclin (second round)
6. (Belgium) Raphaël Collignon (first round)
7. (France) Harold Mayot (quarterfinals)
8. (Lithuania) Ričardas Berankis (champion)

== Draw ==
Key

- Q = Qualifier
- WC = Wild card
- LL = Lucky loser
- Alt = Alternate
- ITF = ITF entry
- PR = Protected ranking
- SR = Special ranking
- SE = Special exempt
- JE = Junior exempt
- JR = Junior Accelerator Programme entrant
- CO = College Accelerator Programme entrant
- NG = Next Gen Accelerator Program entrant
- w/o = Walkover
- r = Retired
- d = Defaulted

=== Finals ===
Semifinals
8	(Lithuania) Ričardas Berankis	6	7
3	(France) Evan Furness	3	5
WC	(France) Pierre-Hugues Herbert	6	2	3
(France) Dan Added	4	6	6

Final
8	(Lithuania) Ričardas Berankis	6	6^{3}	7^{7}
(France) Dan Added	3	7^{7}	6^{5}

=== Top half ===
First round
1	(France) A Escoffier	6	6
Alt	(France) C Chidekh	2	4
(United Kingdom) C Broom	6^{5}	6	3
(France) M Janvier	7^{7}	1	6
(Poland) K Żuk	6^{6}	6	7^{7}
Q	(France) M Bourgue	7^{8}	3	6^{5}
(Turkey) C İlkel	2	0
8	(Lithuania) R Berankis	6	6
3	(France) E Furness	7	6
Q	(France) Jurgen Briand	5	4
(Germany) S Fanselow	6	6
(France) A Hoang	4	3
(Czech Republic) J Forejtek	2	3
WC	(France) S Gueymard Wayenburg	6	6
Q	(France) Alexandre Reco	3	3
7	(France) H Mayot	6	6

Second round
1	(France) A Escoffier	6	4	7^{7}
(France) M Janvier	4	6	6^{3}
(Poland) K Żuk	6^{6}	6	3
8	(Lithuania) R Berankis	7^{8}	2	6
3	(France) E Furness	2	6	6
(Germany) S Fanselow	6	1	4
WC	(France) S Gueymard Wayenburg	3	2
7	(France) H Mayot	6	6

Quarterfinals
1	(France) A Escoffier	6	3	2
8	(Lithuania) R Berankis	2	6	6
3	(France) E Furness	6	6
7	(France) H Mayot	1	4

Semifinals
8	(Lithuania) R Berankis	6	7
3	(France) E Furness	3	5

=== Bottom half ===
First round
6	(Belgium) R Collignon	7	3	3
WC	(France) P-H Herbert	5	6	6
Q	(France) C Bittoun Kouzmine	5	6	4
A Kachmazov	7	1	6
Alt	(Italy) G Oradini	1	6^{2}
Q	(France) L Poullain	6	7^{7}
(France) Mathys Erhard	5	3
4	(Portugal) F Ferreira Silva	7	6
5	(Belgium) G Onclin	6	6
(Japan) S Mochizuki	2	4
(Ukraine) V Sachko	3	3
Q	(Estonia) M Lajal	6	6
Alt	(France) C Hemery	6	4	6
WC	(France) A Ghibaudo	2	6	2
(France) D Added	6	6
2	(Australia) L Tu	4	4

Second round
WC	(France) P-H Herbert	7^{7}	7^{8}
A Kachmazov	6^{5}	6^{6}
Q	(France) L Poullain	6	7^{7}
4	(Portugal) F Ferreira Silva	2	6^{4}
5	(Belgium) G Onclin	6^{5}	5
Q	(Estonia) M Lajal	7^{7}	7
Alt	(France) C Hemery	6	6^{7}	4
(France) D Added	4	7^{9}	6

Quarterfinals
WC	(France) P-H Herbert	7	6
Q	(France) L Poullain	5	3
Q	(Estonia) M Lajal	5	3
(France) D Added	7	6

Semifinals
WC	(France) P-H Herbert	6	2	3
(France) D Added	4	6	6
