= 2019 Open Harmonie mutuelle =

- Date: 25–31 March
- Edition: 16th
- Surface: Hard (indoor)
- Location: Saint-Brieuc, France

Champions

Singles
- (Poland) Kamil Majchrzak

Doubles
- (Israel) Jonathan Erlich / (France) Fabrice Martin
← 2018 ·	Open Harmonie mutuelle	· 2022 →

The 2019 Open Harmonie mutuelle was a professional tennis tournament played on hard courts. It was the sixteenth edition of the tournament which was part of the 2019 ATP Challenger Tour. It took place in Saint-Brieuc, France between 25 and 31 March 2019.

== Singles main-draw entrants ==
=== Seeds ===
Country	Player	Rank^{1}	Seed
LTU	Ričardas Berankis	82	1
~~GER~~	~~Yannick Maden~~	~~108~~	~~2~~
FRA	Grégoire Barrère	120	3
RUS	Evgeny Donskoy	126	4
ITA	Stefano Travaglia	132	5
FRA	Corentin Moutet	136	6
FRA	Antoine Hoang	137	7
POL	Kamil Majchrzak	154	8
AUT	Dennis Novak	156	9
EST	Jürgen Zopp	159	10
FRA	Quentin Halys	163	11
BIH	Mirza Bašić	167	12
GER	Daniel Brands	168	13
AUT	Sebastian Ofner	184	14
KAZ	Aleksandr Nedovyesov	185	15
SVK	Filip Horanský	195	16

- Rankings are as of 18 March 2019.

=== Other entrants ===
The following players received wildcards into the singles main draw:

- (France) Evan Furness
- (France) Hugo Grenier
- (France) Manuel Guinard
- (France) Matteo Martineau
- (France) Alexandre Müller

The following player received entry into the singles main draw as an alternate:

- (Russia) Pavel Kotov

The following players received entry into the singles main draw using their ITF World Tennis Ranking:

- (Spain) Andrés Artuñedo
- (France) Baptiste Crepatte
- (France) Grégoire Jacq
- (Russia) Roman Safiullin

The following players received entry from the qualifying draw:

- (Russia) Aslan Karatsev
- (Ukraine) Sergiy Stakhovsky

The following player received entry as a lucky loser:

- (Netherlands) Jelle Sels

== Champions ==
=== Singles ===
- (Poland) Kamil Majchrzak def. (France) Maxime Janvier 6–3, 7–6^{(7–1)}.

=== Doubles ===
- (Israel) Jonathan Erlich / (France) Fabrice Martin def. (France) Jonathan Eysseric / (Croatia) Antonio Šančić 7–6^{(7–2)}, 7–6^{(7–2)}.
