= 2018 Open Harmonie mutuelle =

- Date: 26 March – 1 April
- Edition: 15th
- Draw: 32S / 16D
- Surface: Hard
- Location: Saint-Brieuc, France

Champions

Singles
- (Lithuania) Ričardas Berankis

Doubles
- (Netherlands) Sander Arends / (Austria) Tristan-Samuel Weissborn
← 2017 ·	Open Harmonie mutuelle	· 2019 →

The 2018 Open Harmonie mutuelle was a professional tennis tournament played on hard courts. It was the fifteenth edition of the tournament which was part of the 2018 ATP Challenger Tour. It took place in Saint-Brieuc, France between 26 March and 1 April 2018.

== Singles main-draw entrants ==
=== Seeds ===
Country	Player	Rank^{1}	Seed
CYP	Marcos Baghdatis	82	1
LTU	Ričardas Berankis	103	2
SVK	Lukáš Lacko	104	3
UKR	Sergiy Stakhovsky	118	4
GER	Oscar Otte	129	5
SWE	Elias Ymer	133	6
FRA	Corentin Moutet	138	7
EST	Jürgen Zopp	147	8

- Rankings are as of 19 March 2018.

=== Other entrants ===
The following players received wildcards into the singles main draw:

- (France) Evan Furness
- (France) Manuel Guinard
- (France) Antoine Hoang
- (France) Ugo Humbert

The following players received entry into the singles main draw as special exempts:

- (France) Grégoire Barrère
- (France) Maxime Janvier

The following players received entry from the qualifying draw:

- (Belgium) Joris De Loore
- (Lithuania) Laurynas Grigelis
- (France) Tristan Lamasine
- (France) Constant Lestienne

== Champions ==
=== Singles ===
- (Lithuania) Ričardas Berankis def. (France) Constant Lestienne 6–2, 5–7, 6–4.

=== Doubles ===
- (Netherlands) Sander Arends / (Austria) Tristan-Samuel Weissborn def. (United Kingdom) Luke Bambridge / (United Kingdom) Joe Salisbury 4–6, 6–1, [10–7].
