= 2017 Open Harmonie mutuelle =

- Date: 28 March – 2 April
- Edition: 14th
- Draw: 32S / 16D
- Prize money: €43,000+H
- Surface: Hard
- Location: Saint-Brieuc, France

Champions

Singles
- (Belarus) Egor Gerasimov

Doubles
- (Germany) Andre Begemann / (Denmark) Frederik Nielsen
← 2016 ·	Open Harmonie mutuelle	· 2018 →

The 2017 Open Harmonie mutuelle will be a professional tennis tournament played on hard courts. It will be the fourteenth edition of the tournament which will be part of the 2017 ATP Challenger Tour. It will take place in Saint-Brieuc, France between 28 March and 2 April 2017.

== Point distribution ==
Event	W	F	SF	QF	Round of 16	Round of 32	Q	Q2
Singles	80	48	29	15	7	0	3	0
Doubles	80	48	29	15	0	—	—	—

== Singles main-draw entrants ==
=== Seeds ===
Country	Player	Rank^{1}	Seed
AUT	Gerald Melzer	109	1
UKR	Sergiy Stakhovsky	111	2
SVK	Norbert Gombos	113	3
SVK	Lukáš Lacko	114	4
FRA	Quentin Halys	140	5
FRA	Kenny de Schepper	144	6
ESP	Rubén Ramírez Hidalgo	148	7
GER	Tobias Kamke	155	8

- Rankings are as of March 20, 2017.

=== Other entrants ===
The following players received wildcards into the singles main draw:

- (France) Rémi Boutillier
- (France) Enzo Couacaud
- (France) Evan Furness
- (France) Corentin Moutet

The following player received entry into the singles main draw using a protected ranking:

- (Italy) Simone Bolelli

The following player received entry into the singles main draw as an alternate:

- (France) Laurent Lokoli

The following players received entry from the qualifying draw:

- (Belarus) Egor Gerasimov
- (France) David Guez
- (France) Hugo Nys
- (Germany) Oscar Otte

== Champions ==
=== Singles ===
- (Belarus) Egor Gerasimov def. (Germany) Tobias Kamke 7–6^{(7–3)}, 7–6^{(7–5)}.

=== Doubles ===
- (Germany) Andre Begemann / (Denmark) Frederik Nielsen def. (Republic of Ireland) David O'Hare / (United Kingdom) Joe Salisbury 6–3, 6–4.
