= 2026 Open Saint-Brieuc =

- Date: 23 February – 1 March
- Edition: 20th
- Surface: Hard (indoor)
- Location: Saint-Brieuc, France

Champions

Singles
- (Austria) Sebastian Ofner

Doubles
- (Switzerland) Jakub Paul / (Czech Republic) Matěj Vocel
- Open Saint-Brieuc

The 2026 Open Saint-Brieuc Armor Agglomération was a professional tennis tournament played on indoor hard courts. It was the 20th edition of the tournament which was part of the 2026 ATP Challenger Tour. It took place in Saint-Brieuc, France between 23 February and 1 March 2026.

== Singles main-draw entrants ==
=== Seeds ===
Country	Player	Rank^{1}	Seed
GBR	Jacob Fearnley	84	1
FRA	Hugo Gaston	96	2
FRA	Titouan Droguet	120	3
AUT	Sebastian Ofner	132	4
EST	Mark Lajal	161	5
FRA	Ugo Blanchet	164	6
AUT	Jurij Rodionov	176	7
	Roman Safiullin	186	8

- Rankings are as of 16 February 2026.

=== Other entrants ===
The following players received wildcards into the singles main draw:

- (France) Moïse Kouamé
- (France) Matteo Martineau
- (France) Raphael Perot

The following player received entry into the singles main draw as an alternate:

- (Slovakia) Norbert Gombos

The following players received entry from the qualifying draw:

- (Germany) Florian Broska
- (Belgium) Buvaysar Gadamauri
- (France) Antoine Ghibaudo
- (France) Laurent Lokoli
- (France) Lucas Poullain
- (United States) Keegan Smith

The following player received entry as a lucky loser:

- (Switzerland) Jakub Paul

== Champions ==
=== Singles ===
- (Austria) Sebastian Ofner def. (France) Pierre-Hugues Herbert 6–4, 7–6^{(7–4)}.

=== Doubles ===
- (Switzerland) Jakub Paul / (Czech Republic) Matěj Vocel def. (France) Arthur Reymond / (France) Luca Sanchez 6–7^{(4–7)}, 7–6^{(7–2)}, [10–5].
