= 2018 Open Harmonie mutuelle – Doubles =

Doubles
- 2018 Open Harmonie mutuelle

Final
- Champions: (Netherlands) Sander Arends (Austria) Tristan-Samuel Weissborn
- Runners-up: (United Kingdom) Luke Bambridge (United Kingdom) Joe Salisbury
- Score: 4–6, 6–1, [10–7]

Events
Singles	Doubles
- Open Harmonie mutuelle

Andre Begemann and Frederik Nielsen were the defending champions but chose not to defend their title.

Sander Arends and Tristan-Samuel Weissborn won the title after defeating Luke Bambridge and Joe Salisbury 4–6, 6–1, [10–7] in the final.

== Seeds ==
1. (France) Hugo Nys / (United Kingdom) Ken Skupski (semifinals)
2. (India) Jeevan Nedunchezhiyan / (India) Purav Raja (first round)
3. (Netherlands) Sander Arends / (Austria) Tristan-Samuel Weissborn (champions)
4. (United Kingdom) Luke Bambridge / (United Kingdom) Joe Salisbury (final)

== Draw ==
Key

- Q = Qualifier
- WC = Wild card
- LL = Lucky loser
- Alt = Alternate
- ITF = ITF entry
- PR = Protected ranking
- SR = Special ranking
- SE = Special exempt
- JE = Junior exempt
- JR = Junior Accelerator Programme entrant
- CO = College Accelerator Programme entrant
- NG = Next Gen Accelerator Program entrant
- w/o = Walkover
- r = Retired
- d = Defaulted

First round
1	(France) H Nys (United Kingdom) K Skupski	6	6
(Australia) B Mousley (Portugal) G Oliveira	4	4
(Germany) A Mies (Germany) O Otte	7^{7}	6
(United States) N Lammons (United States) A Lawson	6^{5}	4
4	(United Kingdom) L Bambridge (United Kingdom) J Salisbury	6	6
(France) T Lamasine (Ukraine) S Stakhovsky	4	4
WC	(France) D Descloix (France) C Lestienne	6	6
WC	(France) G Barrère (France) D Guez	3	4
(United Kingdom) S Clayton (Netherlands) D Pel	6	6
WC	(France) E Furness (France) M Guinard	4	3
(Czech Republic) Z Kolář (Switzerland) L Margaroli	0	3
3	(Netherlands) S Arends (Austria) T-S Weissborn	6	6
(Lithuania) R Berankis (Croatia) M Sabanov	3	3
(Egypt) M Safwat (Estonia) J Zopp	6	6
(Thailand) Sa Ratiwatana (Thailand) So Ratiwatana	7^{7}	3	[10]
2	(India) J Nedunchezhiyan (India) P Raja	6^{5}	6	[8]

Quarterfinals
1	(France) H Nys (United Kingdom) K Skupski	7	7
(Germany) A Mies (Germany) O Otte	5	5
4	(United Kingdom) L Bambridge (United Kingdom) J Salisbury	6	6
WC	(France) D Descloix (France) C Lestienne	4	1
(United Kingdom) S Clayton (Netherlands) D Pel	0	4
3	(Netherlands) S Arends (Austria) T-S Weissborn	6	6
(Egypt) M Safwat (Estonia) J Zopp	1	1
(Thailand) Sa Ratiwatana (Thailand) So Ratiwatana	6	6

Semifinals
1	(France) H Nys (United Kingdom) K Skupski	6^{2}	5
4	(United Kingdom) L Bambridge (United Kingdom) J Salisbury	7^{7}	7
3	(Netherlands) S Arends (Austria) T-S Weissborn	6	6
(Thailand) Sa Ratiwatana (Thailand) So Ratiwatana	4	3

Final
4	(United Kingdom) L Bambridge (United Kingdom) J Salisbury	6	1	[7]
3	(Netherlands) S Arends (Austria) T-S Weissborn	4	6	[10]
