= 2018 Open Harmonie mutuelle – Singles =

Singles
- 2018 Open Harmonie mutuelle

Final
- Champion: (Lithuania) Ričardas Berankis
- Runner-up: (France) Constant Lestienne
- Score: 6–2, 5–7, 6–4

Events
| Singles | Doubles |
- Open Harmonie mutuelle

Egor Gerasimov was the defending champion but lost in the second round to Jürgen Zopp.

Ričardas Berankis won the title after defeating Constant Lestienne 6–2, 5–7, 6–4 in the final.

== Seeds ==
1. (Cyprus) Marcos Baghdatis (semifinals)
2. (Lithuania) Ričardas Berankis (champion)
3. (Slovakia) Lukáš Lacko (first round)
4. (Ukraine) Sergiy Stakhovsky (first round)
5. (Germany) Oscar Otte (first round)
6. (Sweden) Elias Ymer (second round)
7. (France) Corentin Moutet (first round)
8. (Estonia) Jürgen Zopp (semifinals)

== Draw ==
Key

- Q = Qualifier
- WC = Wild card
- LL = Lucky loser
- Alt = Alternate
- ITF = ITF entry
- PR = Protected ranking
- SR = Special ranking
- SE = Special exempt
- JE = Junior exempt
- JR = Junior Accelerator Programme entrant
- CO = College Accelerator Programme entrant
- NG = Next Gen Accelerator Program entrant
- w/o = Walkover
- r = Retired
- d = Defaulted

=== Finals ===
Semifinals
1 | (Cyprus) Marcos Baghdatis | 5 | 1
Q | (France) Constant Lestienne | 7 | 6
8 | (Estonia) Jürgen Zopp | 3 | 3
2 | (Lithuania) Ričardas Berankis | 6 | 6

Final
Q | (France) Constant Lestienne | 2 | 7 | 4
2 | (Lithuania) Ričardas Berankis | 6 | 5 | 6

=== Top half ===
First round
1 | (Cyprus) M Baghdatis | 6 | 6
(Italy) A Arnaboldi | 4 | 3
WC | (France) M Guinard | 4 | 2
(Belarus) U Ignatik | 6 | 6
(Portugal) G Oliveira | 1 | 2
(Germany) M Bachinger | 6 | 6
Q | (Belgium) J De Loore | 6 | 6^{5} | 2
6 | (Sweden) E Ymer | 3 | 7^{7} | 6
4 | (Ukraine) S Stakhovsky | 4 | 3
(Germany) T Kamke | 6 | 6
WC | (France) A Hoang | 6 | 6^{5} | 4
WC | (France) E Furness | 3 | 7^{7} | 6
Q | (Lithuania) L Grigelis | 4 | 6^{4}
(France) S Robert | 6 | 7^{7}
Q | (France) C Lestienne | 6 | 4 | 6
7 | (France) C Moutet | 4 | 6 | 3

Second round
1 | (Cyprus) M Baghdatis | 1 | 6 | 6
(Belarus) U Ignatik | 6 | 2 | 3
(Germany) M Bachinger | 6 | 3 | 6
6 | (Sweden) E Ymer | 4 | 6 | 2
(Germany) T Kamke | 7^{9} | 6
WC | (France) E Furness | 6^{7} | 0
(France) S Robert | 3 | 4
Q | (France) C Lestienne | 6 | 6

Quarterfinals
1 | (Cyprus) M Baghdatis | 6 | 6
(Germany) M Bachinger | 3 | 2
(Germany) T Kamke | 1 | 4
Q | (France) C Lestienne | 6 | 6

Semifinals
1 | (Cyprus) M Baghdatis | 5 | 1
Q | (France) C Lestienne | 7 | 6

=== Bottom half ===
First round
8 | (Estonia) J Zopp | 4 | 6 | 3
(France) V Millot | 6 | 3 | 0^{r}
Q | (France) T Lamasine | 7^{7} | 4 | 2
(Belarus) E Gerasimov | 6^{4} | 6 | 6
(Egypt) M Safwat | 4 | 7 | 5
(Czech Republic) Z Kolář | 6 | 5 | 7
(Bosnia and Herzegovina) A Šetkić | 3 | 6 | 6
3 | (Slovakia) L Lacko | 6 | 3 | 4
5 | (Germany) O Otte | 6 | 6^{8} | 5
SE | (France) G Barrère | 3 | 7^{10} | 7
(Austria) D Novak | 6 | 7^{7}
(France) K de Schepper | 4 | 6^{4}
WC | (France) U Humbert | 4 | 3
SE | (France) M Janvier | 6 | 6
(Poland) K Majchrzak | 3 | 4
2 | (Lithuania) R Berankis | 6 | 6

Second round
8 | (Estonia) J Zopp | 6 | 6
(Belarus) E Gerasimov | 4 | 3
(Czech Republic) Z Kolář | 6 | 6
(Bosnia and Herzegovina) A Šetkić | 4 | 4
SE | (France) G Barrère | 3 | 3
(Austria) D Novak | 6 | 6
SE | (France) M Janvier | 6^{5} | 3
2 | (Lithuania) R Berankis | 7^{7} | 6

Quarterfinals
8 | (Estonia) J Zopp | 2 | 6 | 6
(Czech Republic) Z Kolář | 6 | 3 | 2
(Austria) D Novak | 6^{1} | 6^{4}
2 | (Lithuania) R Berankis | 7^{7} | 7^{7}

Semifinals
8 | (Estonia) J Zopp | 3 | 3
2 | (Lithuania) R Berankis | 6 | 6
