= 2019 Open Harmonie mutuelle – Singles =

Singles
- 2019 Open Harmonie mutuelle

Final
- Champion: (Poland) Kamil Majchrzak
- Runner-up: (France) Maxime Janvier
- Score: 6–3, 7–6^{(7–1)}

Events
Singles	Doubles
- Open Harmonie mutuelle

Ričardas Berankis was the defending champion but lost in the semifinals to Kamil Majchrzak.

Majchrzak won the title after defeating Maxime Janvier 6–3, 7–6^{(7–1)} in the final.

== Seeds ==
All seeds receive a bye into the second round.

1. (Lithuania) Ričardas Berankis (semifinals)
2. (Germany) Yannick Maden (withdrew)
3. (France) Grégoire Barrère (quarterfinals)
4. (Russia) Evgeny Donskoy (quarterfinals)
5. (Italy) Stefano Travaglia (second round)
6. (France) Corentin Moutet (semifinals)
7. (France) Antoine Hoang (quarterfinals)
8. (Poland) Kamil Majchrzak (champion)
9. (Austria) Dennis Novak (third round)
10. (Estonia) Jürgen Zopp (second round)
11. (France) Quentin Halys (second round)
12. (Bosnia and Herzegovina) Mirza Bašić (third round)
13. (Germany) Daniel Brands (second round)
14. (Austria) Sebastian Ofner (third round)
15. (Kazakhstan) Aleksandr Nedovyesov (second round, retired)
16. (Slovakia) Filip Horanský (third round)

== Draw ==
Key

- Q = Qualifier
- WC = Wild card
- LL = Lucky loser
- Alt = Alternate
- ITF = ITF entry
- PR = Protected ranking
- SR = Special ranking
- SE = Special exempt
- JE = Junior exempt
- JR = Junior Accelerator Programme entrant
- CO = College Accelerator Programme entrant
- NG = Next Gen Accelerator Program entrant
- w/o = Walkover
- r = Retired
- d = Defaulted

=== Finals ===
Quarterfinals
1	(Lithuania) Ričardas Berankis	6	6
7	(France) Antoine Hoang	2	3
3	(France) Grégoire Barrère	6^{5}	6	1
8	(Poland) Kamil Majchrzak	7^{7}	1	6
6	(France) Corentin Moutet	7^{7}	6
4	(Russia) Evgeny Donskoy	6^{2}	4
(France) Nicolas Mahut	3	4
(France) Maxime Janvier	6	6

Semifinals
1	(Lithuania) Ričardas Berankis	6^{3}	4
8	(Poland) Kamil Majchrzak	7^{7}	6
6	(France) Corentin Moutet	7^{7}	5	3
(France) Maxime Janvier	6^{3}	7	6

Final
8	(Poland) Kamil Majchrzak	6	7^{7}
(France) Maxime Janvier	3	6^{1}

=== Top half ===
==== Section 1 ====
First round
(France) T Lamasine	4	3
ITF	(France) G Jacq	6	6
(Lithuania) L Grigelis	6^{7}	6^{5}
(Bosnia and Herzegovina) T Brkić	7^{9}	7^{7}
(United States) C Altamirano	3	3
(Austria) L Miedler	6	6
(Germany) D Masur	3	6	4
WC	(France) A Müller	6	3	6

Second round
1	(Lithuania) R Berankis	6	6
ITF	(France) G Jacq	1	3
(Bosnia and Herzegovina) T Brkić	7^{7}	2	2
14	(Austria) S Ofner	6^{3}	6	6
9	(Austria) D Novak	6	7^{11}
(Austria) L Miedler	4	6^{9}
WC	(France) A Müller	6	3	2
7	(France) A Hoang	3	6	6

Third round
1	(Lithuania) R Berankis	6	6
14	(Austria) S Ofner	3	4
9	(Austria) D Novak	4	6^{2}
7	(France) A Hoang	6	7^{7}

Quarterfinals
1	(Lithuania) R Berankis	6	6
7	(France) A Hoang	2	3

==== Section 2 ====
First round
LL	(Netherlands) J Sels	6	6
(France) K de Schepper	4	4
(Italy) M Viola	6	6
(France) S Robert	4	1
Alt	(Russia) P Kotov	1	2
(Denmark) M Torpegaard	6	6
WC	(France) E Furness	4	3
ITF	(France) Baptiste Crepatte	6	6

Second round
3	(France) G Barrère	6	6
LL	(Netherlands) J Sels	4	4
(Italy) M Viola	6	7^{7}
13	(Germany) D Brands	3	6^{4}
10	(Estonia) J Zopp	6	1	1
(Denmark) M Torpegaard	2	6	6
ITF	(France) B Crepatte	3	6^{6}
8	(Poland) K Majchrzak	6	7^{8}

Third round
3	(France) G Barrère	6	6
(Italy) M Viola	1	1
(Denmark) M Torpegaard	3	4
8	(Poland) K Majchrzak	6	6

Quarterfinals
3	(France) G Barrère	6^{5}	6	1
8	(Poland) K Majchrzak	7^{7}	1	6

=== Bottom half ===
==== Section 3 ====
First round
(Turkey) C İlkel	6	6
ITF	(Spain) A Artuñedo	4	4
(Spain) R Ortega Olmedo	4	2
Q	(Russia) A Karatsev	6	6
(France) B Bonzi	6^{3}	1
ITF	(Russia) R Safiullin	7^{7}	6
WC	(France) M Guinard	7	6
(Portugal) G Oliveira	5	1

Second round
6	(France) C Moutet	6	4	6
(Turkey) C İlkel	2	6	1
Q	(Russia) A Karatsev	6	4	6
11	(France) Q Halys	3	6	3
15	(Kazakhstan) A Nedovyesov	4	1^{r}
ITF	(Russia) R Safiullin	6	3
WC	(France) M Guinard	6	6^{5}	3
4	(Russia) E Donskoy	3	7^{7}	6

Third round
6	(France) C Moutet	6	6
Q	(Russia) A Karatsev	3	4
ITF	(Russia) R Safiullin	3	6	5
4	(Russia) E Donskoy	6	3	7

Quarterfinals
6	(France) C Moutet	7^{7}	6
4	(Russia) E Donskoy	6^{2}	4

==== Section 4 ====
First round
(France) N Mahut	6	6
WC	(France) M Martineau	4	4
WC	(France) H Grenier	3	1
(Serbia) V Troicki	6	6
(Russia) A Vatutin	4	4
(France) J Tatlot	6	6
(Slovakia) N Gombos	2	4
(France) M Janvier	6	6

Second round
5	(Italy) S Travaglia	7^{8}	4	3
(France) N Mahut	6^{6}	6	6
(Serbia) V Troicki	4	6	3
12	(Bosnia and Herzegovina) M Bašić	6	2	6
16	(Slovakia) F Horanský	7	4	7^{8}
(France) J Tatlot	5	6	6^{6}
(France) M Janvier	6	7^{7}
Q	(Ukraine) S Stakhovsky	3	6^{5}

Third round
(France) N Mahut	7^{9}	6
12	(Bosnia and Herzegovina) M Bašić	6^{7}	4
16	(Slovakia) F Horanský	5	4
(France) M Janvier	7	6

Quarterfinals
(France) N Mahut	3	4
(France) M Janvier	6	6
