= 2014 Open Harmonie mutuelle =

- Date: 31 March – 6 April
- Edition: 11th
- Draw: 32S / 16D
- Prize money: €30,000+H
- Surface: Hard
- Location: Saint-Brieuc, France

Champions

Singles
- (Germany) Andreas Beck

Doubles
- (Germany) Dominik Meffert / (Germany) Tim Puetz
- Saint-Brieuc Challenger

The 2014 Open Harmonie mutuelle was a professional tennis tournament played on hard courts. It was the eleventh edition of the tournament which was part of the 2014 ATP Challenger Tour. It took place in Saint-Brieuc, France between 31 March and 6 April 2014.

== Singles main-draw entrants ==
=== Seeds ===
Country	Player	Rank^{1}	Seed
FRA	Adrian Mannarino	80	1
RUS	Evgeny Donskoy	108	2
GER	Michael Berrer	117	3
SVN	Aljaž Bedene	119	4
FRA	Marc Gicquel	134	5
FRA	David Guez	168	6
GER	Andreas Beck	173	7
POL	Michał Przysiężny	178	8

=== Other entrants ===
The following players received wildcards into the singles main draw:

- (France) Jules Marie
- (France) Mathieu Rodrigues
- (France) Enzo Couacaud
- (France) Tristan Lamasine

The following players received entry from the qualifying draw:

- (Germany) Dominik Meffert
- (United Kingdom) David Rice
- (France) Hugo Nys
- (Croatia) Toni Androić

== Doubles main-draw entrants ==
=== Seeds ===
Country	Player	Country	Player	Rank	Seed
GRB	Ken Skupski	GRB	Neal Skupski	137	1
AUS	Rameez Junaid	POL	Mateusz Kowalczyk	159	2
RUS	Victor Baluda	GER	Philipp Marx	218	3
GER	Dominik Meffert	GER	Tim Puetz	293	4

=== Other entrants ===
The following pairs received wildcards into the doubles main draw:

- (France) Raphael Jannel / (France) Adrian Mannarino
- (France) Grégoire Jacq / (France) Gleb Sakharov
- (France) Tristan Lamasine / (France) Hugo Nys

== Champions ==
=== Singles ===
- (Germany) Andreas Beck def. (France) Grégoire Burquier, 7–5, 6–3

=== Doubles ===
- (Germany) Dominik Meffert / (Germany) Tim Puetz def. (Russia) Victor Baluda / (Germany) Philipp Marx, 6–4, 6–3
