= 2023 Open Saint-Brieuc =

- Date: 20–26 March
- Edition: 18th
- Surface: Hard (indoor)
- Location: Saint-Brieuc, France

Champions

Singles
- (Lithuania) Ričardas Berankis

Doubles
- (France) Dan Added / (France) Albano Olivetti
- Open Saint-Brieuc

The 2023 Open Saint-Brieuc Armor Agglomération was a professional tennis tournament played on hard courts. It was the 18th edition of the tournament which was part of the 2023 ATP Challenger Tour. It took place in Saint-Brieuc, France between 20 and 26 March 2023.

== Singles main-draw entrants ==
=== Seeds ===
Country	Player	Rank^{1}	Seed
FRA	Antoine Escoffier	197	1
AUS	Li Tu	211	2
FRA	Evan Furness	223	3
POR	Frederico Ferreira Silva	226	4
BEL	Gauthier Onclin	228	5
BEL	Raphaël Collignon	238	6
FRA	Harold Mayot	251	7
LTU	Ričardas Berankis	253	8

- Rankings are as of 6 March 2023.

=== Other entrants ===
The following players received wildcards into the singles main draw:

- (France) Antoine Ghibaudo
- (France) Sascha Gueymard Wayenburg
- (France) Pierre-Hugues Herbert

The following players received entry into the singles main draw as alternates:

- (France) Clément Chidekh
- (France) Calvin Hemery
- (Italy) Giovanni Oradini

The following players received entry from the qualifying draw:

- (France) Constantin Bittoun Kouzmine
- (France) Mathias Bourgue
- (France) Jurgen Briand
- (Estonia) Mark Lajal
- (France) Lucas Poullain
- (France) Alexandre Reco

== Champions ==
=== Singles ===
- (Lithuania) Ričardas Berankis def. (France) Dan Added 6–3, 6–7^{(3–7)}, 7–6^{(7–5)}.

=== Doubles ===
- (France) Dan Added / (France) Albano Olivetti def. (Finland) Patrik Niklas-Salminen / (Netherlands) Bart Stevens 4–6, 7–6^{(9–7)}, [10–6].
