= Nanteuil-en-Vallée =

- Commune
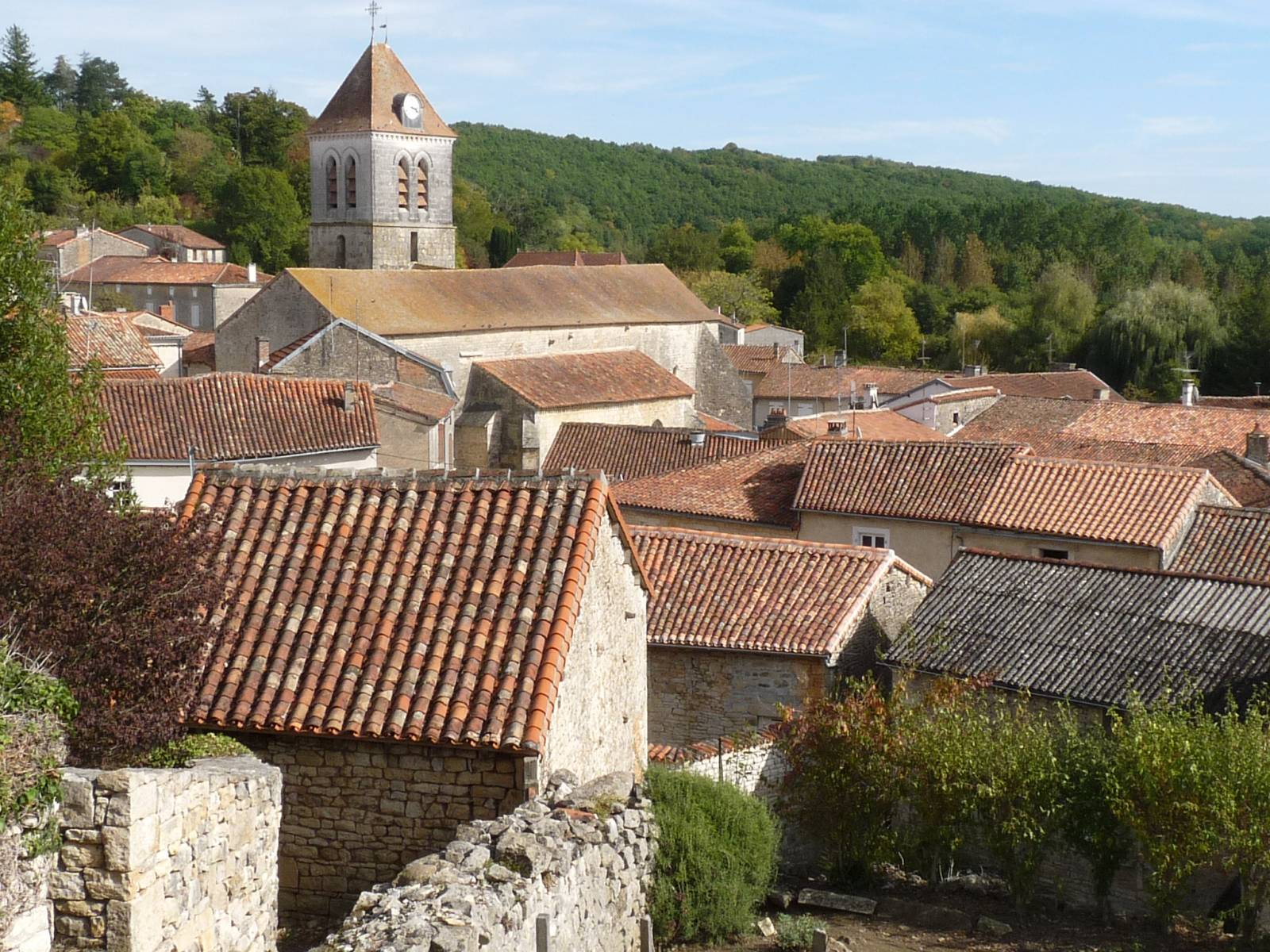
- The church and surroundings in Nanteuil-en-Vallée
- Location of Nanteuil-en-Vallée
- Location within France Location within Nouvelle-Aquitaine
- Coordinates: 46°00′07″N 0°19′28″E
- Country: France
- Region: Nouvelle-Aquitaine
- Department: Charente
- Arrondissement: Confolens
- Canton: Charente-Nord
- Intercommunality: Val de Charente

Government
  - Mayor (2020–2026): Lydie Rollin
- Area^{1}: 68.85 km^{2} (26.58 sq mi)
- Elevation: 108 m (354 ft)
- Highest elevation: 218 m (715 ft)
- Lowest elevation: 82 m (269 ft)
- Population (2023): 1,354
  - Density: 19.67/km^{2} (50.93/sq mi)
- Time zone: UTC+01:00 (CET)
  - Summer (DST): UTC+02:00 (CEST)
- INSEE/Postal code: 16242 /16700
- ^{1} French Land Register data, which excludes lakes, ponds, glaciers > 1 km^{2} (0.386 sq mi or 247 acres) and river estuaries.

Nanteuil-en-Vallée (French pronunciation: [nɑ̃tœj ɑ̃ vale], before 1962: Nanteuil) is a commune in the Charente department in southwestern France.

Nanteuil-en-Vallée was listed as one of France's Petites Cités de Caractère or 'Small Town of Character' in 2016.

== Population ==
Historical population
Year	Pop.	±% p.a.
1968	1,765	—
1975	1,545	−1.88%
1982	1,449	−0.91%
1990	1,496	+0.40%
1999	1,395	−0.77%
2007	1,437	+0.37%
2012	1,452	+0.21%
2017	1,359	−1.32%
2023	1,354	−0.06%
Source: INSEE

== See also ==
- Communes of the Charente department
