= Alexandre Sidorenko =

French tennis player

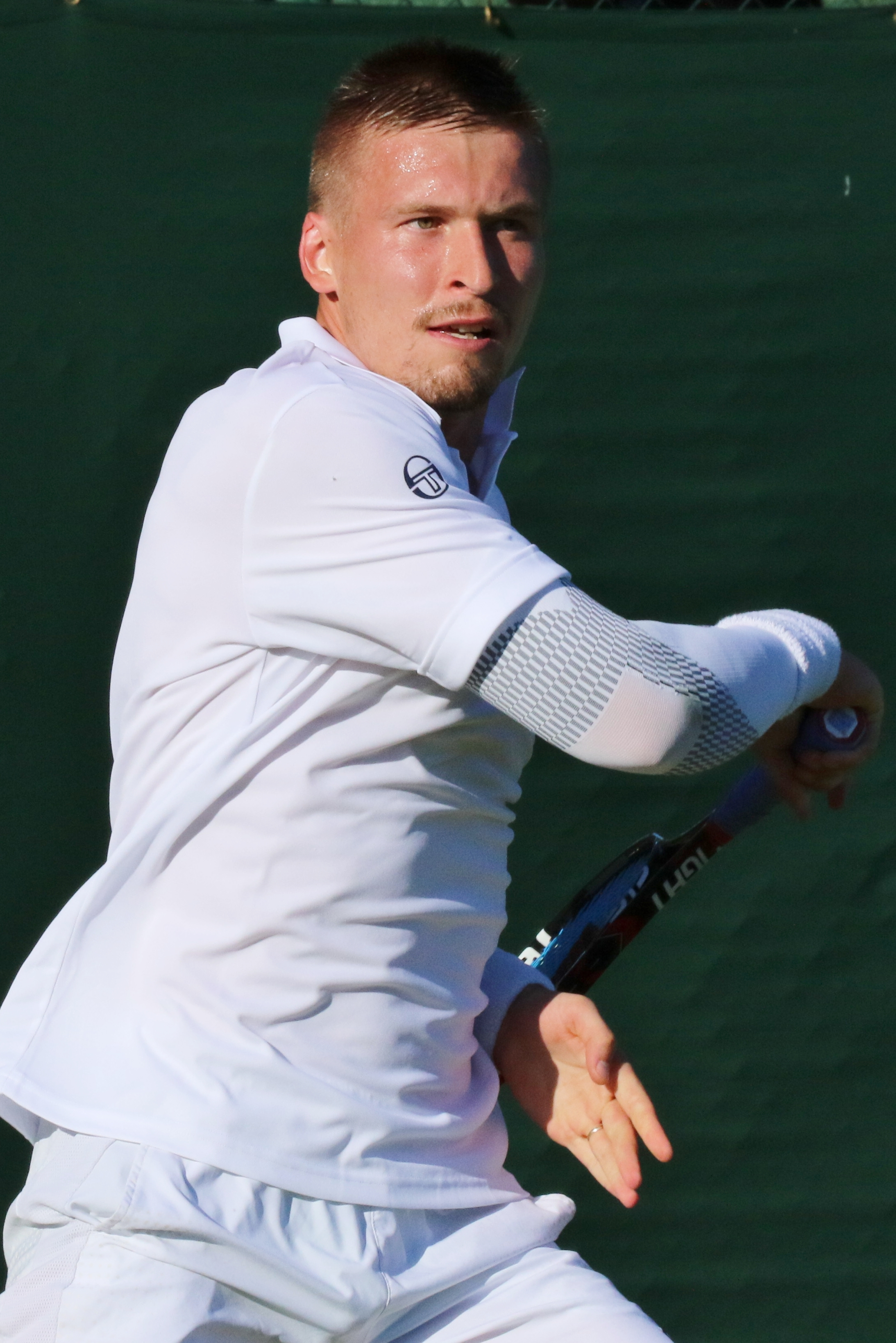
- Sidorenko at the 2016 Wimbledon Championships
- Country (sports): France
- Born: February 18, 1988 (age 38) Saint Petersburg, Russian S.F.S.R.
- Height: 1.85 m (6 ft 1 in)
- Turned pro: 2006
- Plays: Right-handed (two-handed backhand)
- Coach: Valery Sidorenko
- Prize money: $492,431

Singles
- Career record: 4–9 (ATP Tour and Grand Slam main draws, and in Davis Cup)
- Career titles: 0
- Highest ranking: No. 145 (May 25, 2009)

Grand Slam singles results
- Australian Open: Q2 (2009, 2010)
- French Open: 1R (2007, 2009)
- Wimbledon: Q2 (2010, 2016)
- US Open: Q2 (2008, 2009, 2010)

Doubles
- Career record: 4–8 (ATP Tour and Grand Slam main draws, and in Davis Cup)
- Career titles: 0
- Highest ranking: No. 168 (June 7, 2010)

Grand Slam doubles results
- French Open: 3R (2006, 2010)

Grand Slam mixed doubles results
- French Open: 1R (2007, 2010)
- Last updated on: May 20, 2021.

Alexandre Sidorenko (born 18 February 1988) is a French tennis player.

Sidorenko has a career-high ATP singles ranking of world No. 145, achieved on 25 May 2009. He also has a career-high ATP doubles ranking of world No. 168, achieved 7 June 2010.

== Junior career ==
As a junior, Sidorenko reach as high a world No. 3 in the combined singles + doubles junior ranking system. Contributing most significantly to this ranking, was his title run in winning the 2006 Australian Open boys' singles. He defeated Australian Nick Lindahl in straight sets 6–3, 7–6^{(7–4)} to capture the championship.

== Career ==
Sidorenko made his ATP Tour singles main draw debut at the 2006 Open 13 on hard courts in Marseille, France. Having received a wild card granting him direct entry into the first round, he was defeated by Evgeny Korolev of Russia in three sets 6–2, 4–6, 1–6. He made his ATP Tour doubles debut at the same tournament, receiving a wild card into the doubles main draw as well alongside compatriot David Guez. They would lose in the first round to another French partnership in, Gaël Monfils and Paul-Henri Mathieu in three sets 3–6, 6–3, [6–10].

He lost in the first round of the 2007 French Open against Werner Eschauer as a wildcard, when he had to retire. In 2008, he lost to Younes El Aynaoui in the first round of the Munich Open in Germany.

Sidorenko has reached 16 career singles finals, posting a record of 5 wins and 11 losses which includes a 1–1 tally in ATP Challenger Tour finals. He won the 2016 Saint Brieuc Challenger tournament in France, defeating Igor Sijsling 2–6, 6–3, 7–6^{(7–3)} in the final to claim the championship. Additionally, he has reached 25 career doubles finals, posting a record of 10 wins and 15 losses which included a 2–1 record in ATP Challenger Tour finals.

== Performance timelines ==
Key
W	F	SF	QF	#R	RR	Q#	DNQ	A	NH

(W) winner; (F) finalist; (SF) semifinalist; (QF) quarterfinalist; (#R) rounds 4, 3, 2, 1; (RR) round-robin stage; (Q#) qualification round; (DNQ) did not qualify; (A) absent; (NH) not held; (SR) strike rate (events won / competed); (W–L) win–loss record.
To avoid confusion and double counting, these charts are updated at the conclusion of a tournament or when the player's participation has ended.

=== Singles ===
Tournament	2005	2006	2007	2008	2009	2010	2011	2012	2013	2014	2015	2016	SR	W–L	Win %
Grand Slam tournaments
Australian Open	A	A	Q1	A	Q2	Q2	A	A	A	A	A	A	0 / 0	0–0	–
French Open	Q1	Q3	1R	Q2	1R	Q3	A	A	A	A	A	Q2	0 / 2	0–2	0%
Wimbledon	A	A	A	A	Q1	Q2	A	A	A	A	A	Q2	0 / 0	0–0	–
US Open	A	A	A	Q2	Q2	Q2	A	A	A	A	A	Q1	0 / 0	0–0	–
Win–loss	0–0	0–0	0–1	0–0	0–1	0–0	0–0	0–0	0–0	0–0	0–0	0–0	0 / 2	0–2	0%

=== Doubles ===
Tournament	2006	2007	2008	2009	2010	2011	2012	2013	2014	2015	2016	SR	W–L	Win %
Grand Slam tournaments
Australian Open	A	A	A	A	A	A	A	A	A	A	A	0 / 0	0–0	–
French Open	3R	1R	A	A	3R	1R	A	A	A	A	1R	0 / 5	4–5	44%
Wimbledon	A	A	A	A	A	A	A	A	A	A	A	0 / 0	0–0	–
US Open	A	A	A	A	A	A	A	A	A	A	A	0 / 0	0–0	–
Win–loss	2–1	0–1	0–0	0–0	2–1	0–1	0–0	0–0	0–0	0–0	0–1	0 / 5	4–5	44%

== ATP Challenger and ITF Futures finals ==
=== Singles: 16 (5–11) ===
Legend ATP Challenger (1–1) ITF Futures (4–10)	Finals by surface Hard (3–6) Clay (2–5) Grass (0–0) Carpet (0–0)

Result	W–L	Date	Tournament	Tier	Surface	Opponent	Score
Win	1–0	Jun 2006	France F8, Blois	Futures	Clay	(France) David Guez	6–2, 6–7^{(4–7)}, 6–4
Loss	1–1	Jul 2006	France F11, Saint-Gervais	Futures	Clay	(Argentina) Horacio Zeballos	4–6, 1–6
Win	2–1	Sep 2006	France F12, Bagnères-de-Bigorre	Futures	Hard	(Germany) Sebastian Rieschick	4–6, 6–3, 6–2
Loss	2–2	Jul 2007	France F9, Toulon	Futures	Clay	(Spain) David Marrero	4–6, 2–6
Win	3–2	Apr 2008	France F6, Angers	Futures	Clay	(France) Sébastien de Chaunac	6–7^{(7–9)}, 6–2, 7–6^{(7–5)}
Loss	3–3	Jun 2008	Netherlands F3, Breda	Futures	Clay	(Germany) Alexander Flock	2–6, 3–6
Loss	3–4	Sep 2008	Grenoble, France	Challenger	Hard	(Belgium) Kristof Vliegen	4–6, 3–6
Loss	3–5	Jan 2011	Great Britain F1, Glasgow	Futures	Hard	(France) Kenny de Schepper	5–7, 5–7
Loss	3–6	Aug 2011	Belgium F6, Ostend	Futures	Clay	(Germany) Peter Torebko	4–6, 0–6
Loss	3–7	Sep 2011	France F13, Bagnères-de-Bigorre	Futures	Hard	(France) Mathieu Rodrigues	4–6, 7–5, 2–6
Loss	3–8	Oct 2011	France F17, Nevers	Futures	Hard	(Czech Republic) Jan Mertl	6–3, 3–6, 4–6
Loss	3–9	Aug 2014	Belgium F9, Ostend	Futures	Clay	(France) Constant Lestienne	4–6, 2–6
Loss	3–10	Oct 2014	France F23, Cap D'Agde	Futures	Hard	(Belgium) Maxime Authom	4–6, 2–6
Loss	3–11	Aug 2015	France F16, Ajaccio	Futures	Hard	(France) David Guez	3–6, 4–6
Win	4–11	Mar 2016	France F7, Villers-lès-Nancy	Futures	Hard	(France) Tak Khunn Wang	7–5, 6–4
Win	5–11	Apr 2016	Saint Brieuc, France	Challenger	Hard	(Netherlands) Igor Sijsling	2–6, 6–3, 7–6^{(7–3)}

=== Doubles: 25 (10–15) ===
Legend ATP Challenger (2–1) ITF Futures (8–14)	Finals by surface Hard (7–7) Clay (3–8) Grass (0–0) Carpet (0–0)

Result	W–L	Date	Tournament	Tier	Surface	Partner	Opponents	Score
Loss	0–1	Sep 2004	France F14, Mulhouse	Futures	Hard	(France) Josselin Ouanna	(United Kingdom) Jonathan Marray (United Kingdom) David Sherwood	2–6, 1–6
Loss	0–2	Jul 2005	France F10, Bourg-en-Bresse	Futures	Clay	(France) Xavier Audouy	(Argentina) Diego Junquiera (Argentina) Damián Patriarca	2–6, 4–6
Loss	0–3	Sep 2006	Freudenstadt, Germany	Challenger	Clay	(Germany) Mischa Zverev	(Germany) Tomas Behrend (Germany) Dominik Meffert	5–7, 6–7^{(5–7)}
Win	1–3	Mar 2007	France F4, Lille	Futures	Hard	(France) Gregory Carraz	(Romania) Florin Mergea (United States) Brian Wilson	6–7^{(4–7)}, 6–4, 6–3
Win	2–3	Jul 2009	Poznań, Poland	Challenger	Clay	(Argentina) Sergio Roitman	(Germany) Michael Kohlmann (Netherlands) Rogier Wassen	6–4, 6–4
Loss	2–4	Jul 2011	France F10, Montauban	Futures	Clay	(France) Fabrice Martin	(France) Pierre-Hugues Herbert (France) Nicolas Renavand	4–6, 4–6
Loss	2–5	Sep 2011	Netherlands F6, Apeldoorn	Futures	Clay	(France) Laurent Rochette	(Chile) Rodrigo Perez (Ecuador) Juan Sebastián Vivanco	5–7, 6–2, [7–10]
Win	3–5	Sep 2011	France F15, Plaisir	Futures	Hard	(Brazil) Caio Silva	(France) Marc Auradou (France) Antoine Tassart	6–2, 6–4
Loss	3–6	Oct 2011	France F17, Nevers	Futures	Hard	(Republic of Ireland) James Cluskey	(France) Kevin Botti (France) Laurent Rochette	6–7^{(3–7)}, 3–6
Loss	3–7	May 2012	Great Britain F7, Edinburgh	Futures	Clay	(France) Gleb Sakharov	(Belgium) Arthur De Greef (France) Jérôme Inzerillo	6–7^{(5–7)}, 6–3, [8–10]
Loss	3–8	Sep 2012	Italy F24, Piombino	Futures	Hard	(France) Yannick Jankovits	(United Kingdom) Darren Walsh (United States) Adham El-Effendi	3–6, 1–6
Win	4–8	Oct 2012	France F19, Nevers	Futures	Hard	(France) Yannick Jankovits	(France) Constantin Belot (France) Vincent Millot	6–2, 6–2
Loss	4–9	Oct 2012	France F20, Saint-Dizier	Futures	Hard	(Republic of Ireland) James Cluskey	(France) Antoine Benneteau (France) Nicolas Renavand	5–7, 4–6
Win	5–9	Aug 2013	Belgium F9, Koksijde	Futures	Clay	(France) Antoine Hoang	(Belgium) Robin Cambier (Belgium) Kevin Farin	6–3, 7–6^{(7–5)}
Win	6–9	Aug 2014	Netherlands F5, Oldenzaal	Futures	Clay	(Netherlands) Sander Groen	(Netherlands) Romano Frantzen (United Kingdom) Darren Walsh	6–3, 6–2
Win	7–9	Oct 2014	France F23, Cap D'Agde	Futures	Hard	(Netherlands) Sander Groen	(United Kingdom) Joe Salisbury (Republic of Ireland) David O'Hare	6–4, 5–7, [10–8]
Loss	7–10	Jan 2015	France F1, Bagnoles-de-l'Orne	Futures	Clay	(France) Quentin Halys	(France) Dorian Descloix (France) Gleb Sakharov	4–6, 2–6
Loss	7–11	Mar 2015	France F5, Toulouse	Futures	Hard	(France) Hugo Nys	(France) Romain Bauvy (France) Yanais Laurent	3–6, 6–7^{(4–7)}
Win	8–11	Mar 2015	France F6, Poitiers	Futures	Hard	(France) Grégoire Burquier	(France) Grégoire Jacq (France) Constant Lestienne	6–4, 6–2
Win	9–11	Mar 2015	France F7, Saint-Raphaël	Futures	Hard	(France) Yannick Jankovits	(Italy) Erik Crepaldi (Italy) Gianluca Mager	6–1, 6–4
Win	10–11	Apr 2015	Saint Brieuc, France	Challenger	Hard	(France) Grégoire Burquier	(Japan) Yasutaka Uchiyama (Poland) Andriej Kapaś	6–3, 6–4
Loss	10–12	May 2015	Italy F10, Bergamo	Futures	Clay	(Portugal) Gonçalo Oliveira	(Italy) Riccardo Bonadio (Italy) Pietro Rondoni	4–6, 3–6
Loss	10–13	Jun 2015	Netherlands F2, Breda	Futures	Clay	(Netherlands) Sander Groen	(Australia) Maverick Banes (Republic of Ireland) Sam Barry	3–6, 5–7
Loss	10–14	Sep 2015	France F17, Bagnères-de-Bigorre	Futures	Hard	(France) Grégoire Barrère	(France) Tom Jomby (France) Mick Lescure	6–4, 3–6, [4–10]
Loss	10–15	Sep 2016	France F17, Bagnères-de-Bigorre	Futures	Hard	(France) Mick Lescure	(Belgium) Maxime Authom (France) Laurent Rochette	4–6, 6–2, [8–10]

== Junior Grand Slam finals ==
=== Singles: 1 (1 title) ===
Result	Year	Tournament	Surface	Opponent	Score
Win	2006	Australian Open	Hard	(Australia) Nick Lindahl	6–3, 7–6^{(7–4)}
