= Grégoire Burquier =

French tennis player

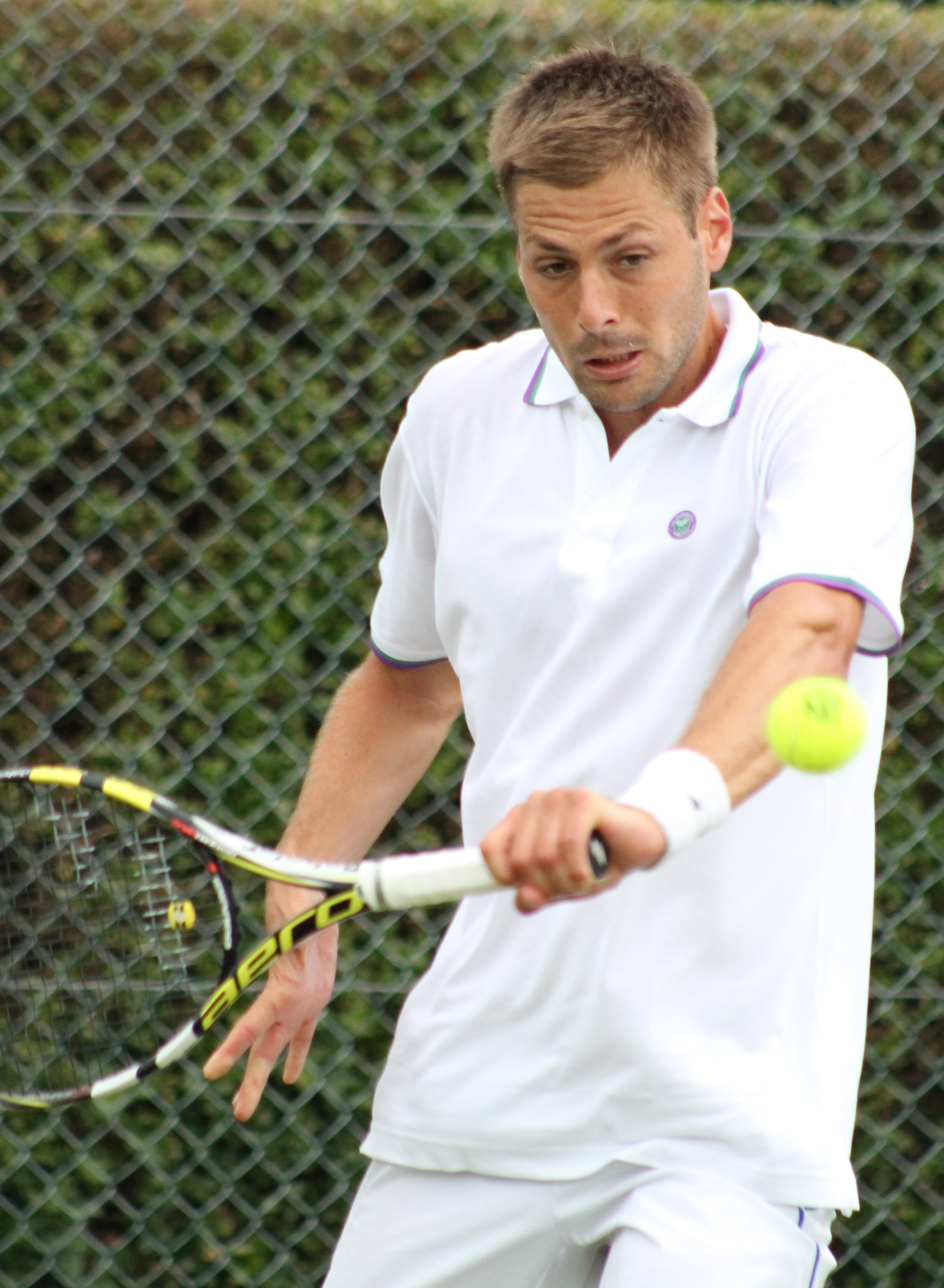
- Country (sports): France
- Residence: France
- Born: 7 July 1984 (age 41) France
- Turned pro: 2007
- Plays: Left-handed (one-handed backhand)
- Prize money: $235,078

Singles
- Career record: 0–1
- Career titles: 0
- Highest ranking: No. 167 (12 September 2011)

Grand Slam singles results
- Australian Open: Q1 (2011, 2012, 2013, 2014)
- French Open: Q1 (2011, 2012, 2014)
- Wimbledon: Q2 (2011, 2014)
- US Open: Q2 (2011)

Doubles
- Career record: 0–0
- Career titles: 0
- Highest ranking: No. 251 (19 September 2011)
- Last updated on: 18 February 2022.

Grégoire Burquier (born 7 August 1984) is a French professional tennis player. He competes mainly on the ATP Challenger Tour and ITF Futures, both in singles and doubles. He reached his highest ATP singles ranking of World No. 167 in September 2011, and his highest ATP doubles ranking of World No. 251 in September 2011.

He claimed his first Challenger singles title by winning the 2012 Open Prévadiès Saint–Brieuc in Saint-Brieuc, France. He won against Augustin Gensse 7–5, 6–7, 7–6.

== ATP Challenger and ITF Futures finals ==
=== Singles: 24 (10–14) ===
Legend ATP Challenger (1–3) ITF Futures (9–11)	Finals by surface Hard (6–11) Clay (4–3) Grass (0–0) Carpet (0–0)

Result	W–L	Date	Tournament	Tier	Surface	Opponent	Score
Win	1-0	Feb 2008	Great Britain F3, Tipton	Futures	Hard	(Germany) Alexander Flock	6–7^{(1–7)}, 6–4, 7–6^{(7–3)}
Loss	1-1	Aug 2008	Great Britain F11, Ilkley	Futures	Hard	(France) Mathieu Rodrigues	4–6, 6–7^{(8–10)}
Loss	1-2	Mar 2009	Canada F2, Montreal	Futures	Hard	(Canada) Milos Raonic	3–6, 4–6
Loss	1-3	Apr 2009	Turkey F6, Antalya	Futures	Hard	(Monaco) Thomas Oger	6–7^{(5–7)}, 3–6
Win	2-3	Jul 2009	Morocco F5, Khemisset	Futures	Clay	(Morocco) Yassine Idmbarek	6–1, 6–2
Loss	2-4	Nov 2009	France F20, Rodez	Futures	Hard	(Morocco) Rabie Chaki	4–6, 7–5, 6–7^{(7–9)}
Win	3-4	Jan 2010	France F1, Bagnoles-de-l'Orne	Futures	Clay	(Spain) José Checa Calvo	4–6, 6–4, 6–4
Win	4-4	Sep 2010	France F13, Bagnères-de-Bigorre	Futures	Hard	(France) Ludovic Walter	6–3, 7–6^{(7–4)}
Win	5-4	Oct 2010	France F17, Nevers	Futures	Hard	(France) Kenny de Schepper	3–6, 6–4, 6–3
Win	6-4	Oct 2010	France F20, Rodez	Futures	Hard	(Latvia) Karlis Lejnieks	6–4, 3–6, 6–4
Win	7-4	Nov 2010	Israel F5, Tel Aviv	Futures	Hard	(France) Rudy Coco	6–1, 6–3
Loss	7-5	Mar 2011	Italy F1, Trento	Futures	Hard	(Italy) Stefano Galvani	4–6, 6–3, 3–6
Win	8-5	Jul 2011	France F12, Saint-Gervais	Futures	Clay	(Netherlands) Antal van der Duim	4–6, 7–5, 6–2
Loss	8-6	Aug 2011	Segovia, Spain	Challenger	Hard	(Slovakia) Karol Beck	4–6, 6–7^{(4–7)}
Loss	8-7	Feb 2012	France F3, Feucherolles	Futures	Hard	(Belgium) Maxime Authom	4–6, 2–6
Win	9-7	Apr 2012	Saint-Brieuc, France	Challenger	Clay	(France) Augustin Gensse	7–6, 6–7^{(5–7)}, 7–6^{(7–3)}
Loss	9-8	Jul 2012	France F14, Saint-Gervais	Futures	Clay	(France) Nicolas Renavand	6–4, 6–7^{(1–7)}, 4–6
Loss	9-9	Sep 2012	France F16, Mulhouse	Futures	Hard	(France) Marc Gicquel	4–6, 3–6
Loss	9-10	Oct 2012	France F21, La Roche-sur-Yon	Futures	Hard	(Belgium) Maxime Authom	2–6, 6–3, 2–6
Loss	9-11	Aug 2013	Cordenons, Italy	Challenger	Clay	(Spain) Pablo Carreño Busta	4–6, 4–6
Loss	9-12	Oct 2013	Italy F28, Biella	Futures	Clay	(Italy) Matteo Donati	6–3, 6–7^{(3–7)}, 3–6
Win	10-12	Oct 2013	France F19, Saint-Dizier	Futures	Hard	(France) Mathieu Rodrigues	7–5, 6–1
Loss	10-13	Jan 2014	France F2, Bressuire	Futures	Hard	(France) Josselin Ouanna	6–7^{(4–7)}, 6–1, 4–6
Loss	10-14	Apr 2014	Saint-Brieuc, France	Challenger	Hard	(Germany) Andreas Beck	5–7, 3–6

=== Doubles: 16 (9–7) ===
Legend ATP Challenger (1–2) ITF Futures (8–5)	Finals by surface Hard (3–6) Clay (5–1) Grass (1–0) Carpet (0–0)

Result	W–L	Date	Tournament	Tier	Surface	Partner	Opponents	Score
Win	1–0	Aug 2008	Great Britain F11, Ilkley	Futures	Grass	(France) Mathieu Rodrigues	(United Kingdom) Andrew Fitzpatrick (Russia) Alexei Grigorov	3–6, 6–2, [10–6]
Loss	1–1	Apr 2009	Turkey F4, Antalya	Futures	Hard	(France) Rudy Coco	(Germany) Kevin Deden (Germany) Martin Emmrich	7–6^{(7–5)}, 0–6, [7–10]
Win	2–1	Jun 2009	Morocco F3, Rabat	Futures	Clay	(Belgium) Maxime Authom	(Switzerland) Adrien Bossel (Belgium) Julien Dubail	6–1, 6–0
Win	3–1	Aug 2009	Lithuania F1, Vilnius	Futures	Clay	(France) Thomas Cazes-Carrère	(Belarus) Sergey Betov (Belarus) Dzmitry Zhyrmont	6–3, 6–4
Win	4–1	Oct 2009	France F18, Saint-Dizier	Futures	Hard	(France) Baptiste Bayet	(France) Jeremy Corbiere (France) Hugo Nys	6–3, 6–1
Loss	4–2	Sep 2010	France F13, Bagnères-de-Bigorre	Futures	Hard	(France) Simon Cauvard	(Italy) Riccardo Ghedin (France) Alexandre Penaud	6–3, 2–6, [8–10]
Win	5–2	Oct 2010	France F17, Nevers	Futures	Hard	(France) Simon Cauvard	(France) Dorian Descloix (France) Yannick Jankovits	6–4, 6–3
Loss	5–3	Oct 2010	France F20, Rodez	Futures	Hard	(France) Simon Cauvard	(France) Olivier Charroin (France) Vincent Stouff	6–4, 6–7^{(8–10)}, [4–10]
Loss	5–4	Mar 2011	Italy F1, Trento	Futures	Hard	(France) Kevin Botti	(Latvia) Deniss Pavlovs (Italy) Walter Trusendi	2–6, 5–7
Loss	5–5	Apr 2011	Saint Brieuc, France	Challenger	Clay	(France) Romain Jouan	(Poland) Tomasz Bednarek (Sweden) Andreas Siljeström	4–6, 7–6^{(7–4)}, [12–14]
Win	6–5	Apr 2011	France F6, Angers	Futures	Clay	(France) Romain Jouan	(Republic of Ireland) Daniel Glancy (New Zealand) Sebastian Lavie	6–3, 6–2
Loss	6–6	Sep 2011	Istanbul, Turkey	Challenger	Hard	(Belgium) Yannick Mertens	(Australia) Carsten Ball (Germany) Andre Begemann	2–6, 4–6
Win	7–6	Jul 2012	France F14, Saint-Gervais	Futures	Clay	(France) Kevin Botti	(France) Simon Cauvard (France) Nicolas Tourte	7–5, 4–6, [12–10]
Loss	7–7	Sep 2012	France F16, Mulhouse	Futures	Hard	(France) Kevin Botti	(France) Charles-Antoine Brézac (France) Alexandre Penaud	7–5, 1–6, [8–10]
Win	8–7	Mar 2015	France F6, Poitiers	Futures	Clay	(France) Alexandre Sidorenko	(France) Grégoire Jacq (France) Constant Lestienne	6–4, 6–2
Win	9–7	Apr 2015	Saint Brieuc, France	Challenger	Hard	(France) Alexandre Sidorenko	(Poland) Andriej Kapaś (Japan) Yasutaka Uchiyama	6–3, 6–4

== Performance timeline ==
Key
W	F	SF	QF	#R	RR	Q#	DNQ	A	NH

(W) winner; (F) finalist; (SF) semifinalist; (QF) quarterfinalist; (#R) rounds 4, 3, 2, 1; (RR) round-robin stage; (Q#) qualification round; (DNQ) did not qualify; (A) absent; (NH) not held; (SR) strike rate (events won / competed); (W–L) win–loss record.

=== Singles ===
Tournament	2011	2012	2013	2014	SR	W–L	Win %
Grand Slam tournaments
Australian Open	Q1	Q1	Q1	Q1	0 / 0	0–0	–
French Open	Q1	Q1	A	Q1	0 / 0	0–0	–
Wimbledon	Q2	Q1	A	Q2	0 / 0	0–0	–
US Open	Q2	Q1	A	Q1	0 / 0	0–0	–
Win–loss	0–0	0–0	0–0	0–0	0 / 0	0–0	–
