= Open Saint-Brieuc =

- 2026 Open Saint-Brieuc

Tournament information
- Event name: Open Saint-Brieuc Armor Agglomération
- Location: Saint-Brieuc, France
- Venue: Salle Steredenn
- Category: ATP Challenger Tour 100 (2026-)
- Surface: Red clay (2004–2012); Hard (indoor) (2013-2024)
- Draw: 32S/24Q/16D
- Prize money: €160,680
- Website: Website

Current champions (2024)
- Singles: (France) Benjamin Bonzi
- Doubles: (France) Geoffrey Blancaneaux (France) Gabriel Debru

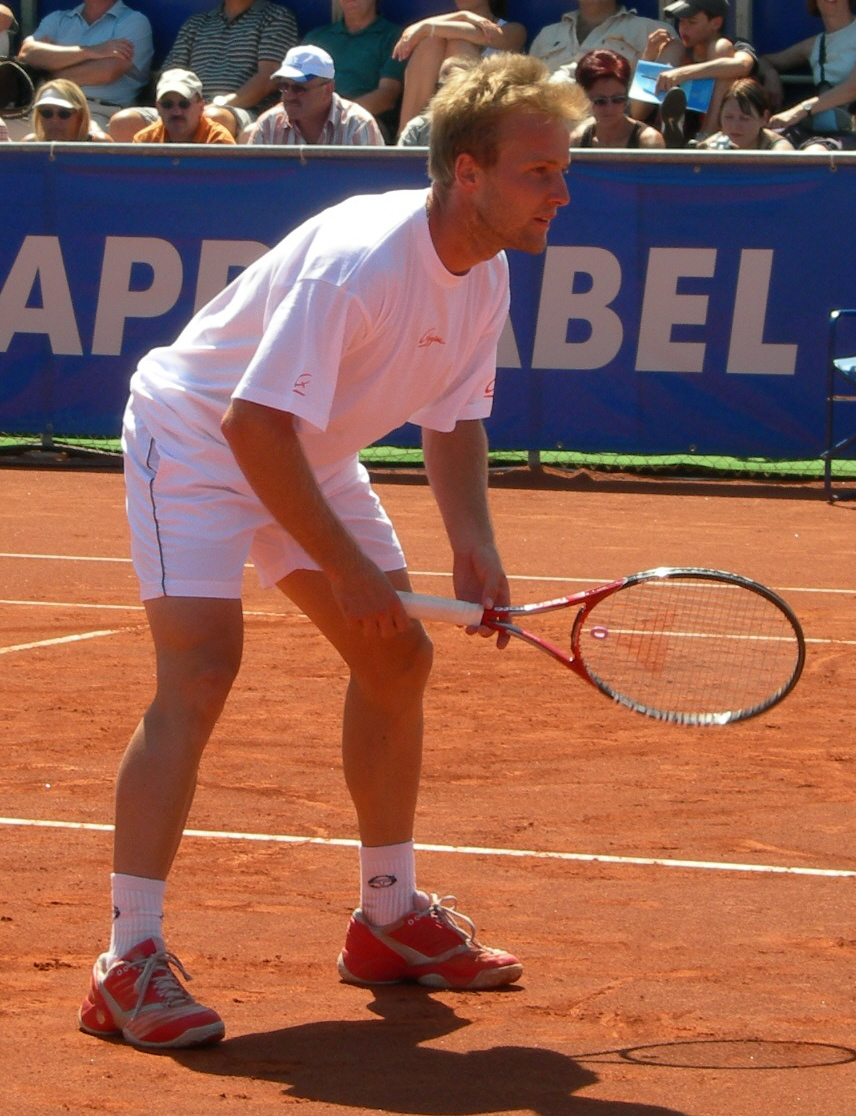
2004 singles runner-up, doubles champion, Belgian Christophe Rochus eventually took the singles title in 2008

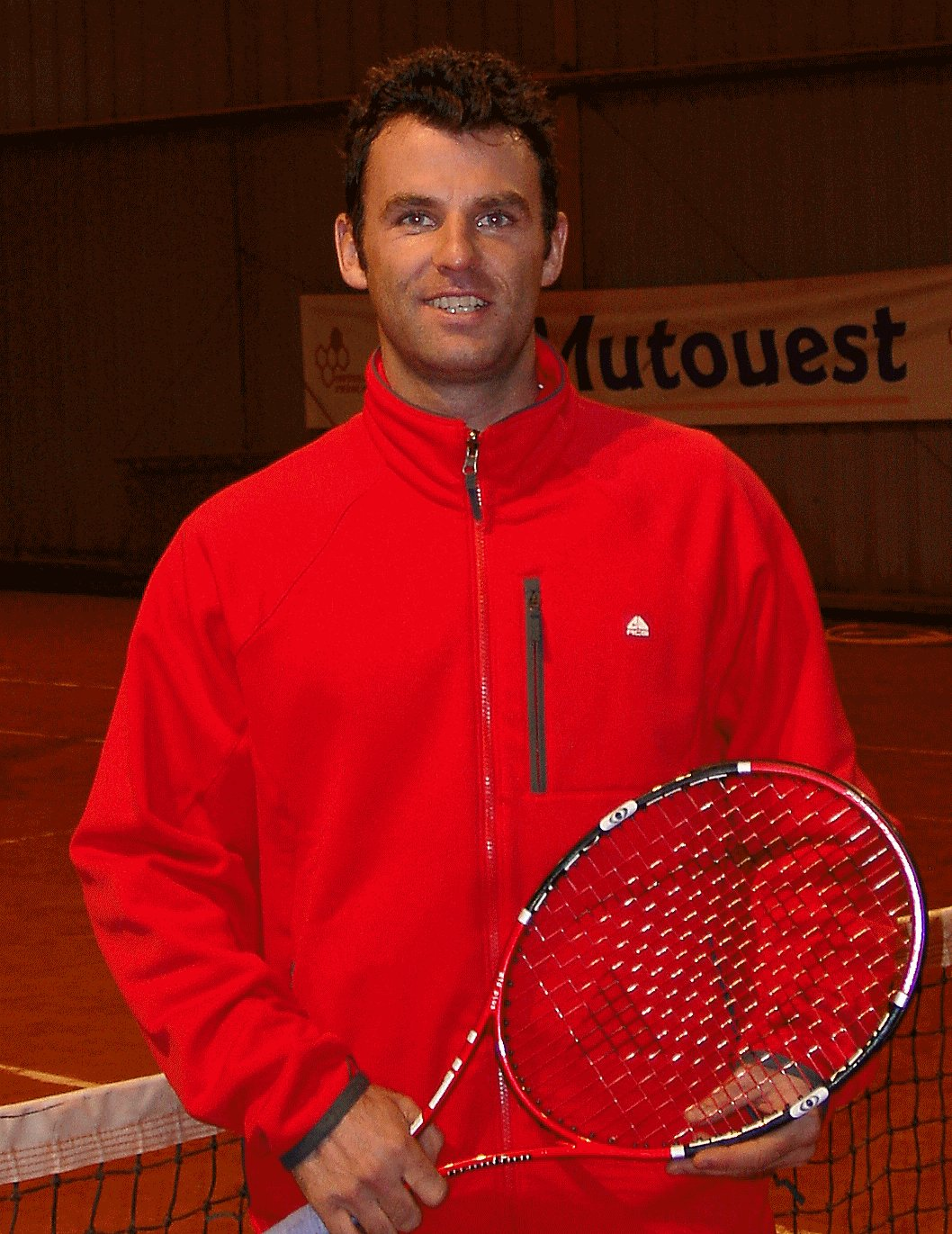
Marc Gicquel is one of seven Frenchmen to have won the singles title in the tournament's twelve editions

The Open Saint-Brieuc Armor Agglomération (formerly Open Harmonie mutuelle, Open Prévadiès Saint–Brieuc) is a professional tennis tournament played on indoor hardcourts. It is part of the ATP Challenger Tour. It is held annually in Saint-Brieuc, France, in 2004-2024 and restarting in 2026 as a Challenger 100.

== Past finals ==
=== Singles ===
Year	Champion	Runner-up	Score
2004	(France) Olivier Mutis	(Belgium) Christophe Rochus	6–1, 4–6, 6–2
2005	(France) Olivier Patience	(Romania) Victor Ioniță	6–0, 6–2
2006	(France) Marc Gicquel	(Netherlands) Peter Wessels	6–3, 6–1
2007	(Denmark) Kristian Pless	(Uzbekistan) Farrukh Dustov	6–3, 6–1
2008	(Belgium) Christophe Rochus	(Spain) Marcel Granollers	6–2, 4–6, 6–1
2009	(France) Josselin Ouanna	(France) Adrian Mannarino	7–5, 1–6, 6–4
2010	(Poland) Michał Przysiężny	(Spain) Rubén Ramírez Hidalgo	4–6, 6–2, 6–3
2011	(France) Maxime Teixeira	(France) Benoît Paire	6–3, 6–0
2012	(France) Grégoire Burquier	(France) Augustin Gensse	7–5, 6–7^{(5–7)}, 7–6^{(7–3)}
2013	(Netherlands) Jesse Huta Galung	(France) Kenny de Schepper	7–6 ^{(7–4)}, 4–6, 7–6 ^{(7–3)}
2014	(Germany) Andreas Beck	(France) Grégoire Burquier	7–5, 6–3
2015	(France) Nicolas Mahut	(Japan) Yūichi Sugita	3–6, 7–6^{(7–3)}, 6–4
2016	(France) Alexandre Sidorenko	(Netherlands) Igor Sijsling	2–6, 6–3, 7–6^{(7–3)}
2017	(Belarus) Egor Gerasimov	(Germany) Tobias Kamke	7–6^{(7–3)}, 7–6^{(7–5)}
2018	(Lithuania) Ričardas Berankis	(France) Constant Lestienne	6–2, 5–7, 6–4
2019	(Poland) Kamil Majchrzak	(France) Maxime Janvier	6–3, 7–6^{(7–1)}
2020–2021	Not held		
2022	(United Kingdom) Jack Draper	(Belgium) Zizou Bergs	6–2, 5–7, 6–4
2023	(Lithuania) Ričardas Berankis	(France) Dan Added	6–3, 6–7^{(3–7)}, 7–6^{(7–5)}
2024	(France) Benjamin Bonzi	(France) Lucas Pouille	6–2, 6–3
2025	Not held		
2026	(Austria) Sebastian Ofner	(France) Pierre-Hugues Herbert	6–4, 7–6^{(7–4)}

=== Doubles ===
Year	Champions	Runners-up	Score
2004	(Belgium) Christophe Rochus (Belgium) Tom Vanhoudt	(Czech Republic) David Škoch (Czech Republic) Jiří Vaněk	6–0, 6–1
2005	(Romania) Victor Ioniță (Romania) Gabriel Moraru	(Slovakia) Michal Mertiňák (Czech Republic) Daniel Vacek	6–1, 6–4
2006	(United States) Eric Butorac (United States) Chris Drake	(Switzerland) Michael Lammer (France) Stéphane Robert	6–4, 6–4
2007	(France) Jean-Baptiste Perlant (France) Xavier Pujo	(France) Jean-Christophe Faurel (France) Jérôme Haehnel	2–6, 6–2, 10–7
2008	(Romania) Adrian Cruciat (Spain) Daniel Muñoz de la Nava	(China) Yu Xin-yuan (China) Zeng Shao-Xuan	4–6, 6–4, 10–4
2009	(United States) David Martin (Germany) Simon Stadler	(Australia) Peter Luczak (Australia) Joseph Sirianni	6–3, 6–2
2010	(Belarus) Uladzimir Ignatik (Spain) David Marrero	(United States) Brian Battistone (United States) Ryler DeHeart	4–6, 6–4, [10–5]
2011	(Poland) Tomasz Bednarek (Sweden) Andreas Siljeström	(France) Grégoire Burquier (France) Romain Jouan	6–4, 6–7^{(4–7)}, [14–12]
2012	(Lithuania) Laurynas Grigelis (Australia) Rameez Junaid	(France) Stéphane Robert (France) Laurent Rochette	1–6, 6–2, [10–6]
2013	(Poland) Tomasz Bednarek (Sweden) Andreas Siljeström	(Netherlands) Jesse Huta Galung (Russia) Konstantin Kravchuk	6–3, 4–6, [10–7]
2014	(Germany) Dominik Meffert (Germany) Tim Pütz	(Russia) Victor Baluda (Germany) Philipp Marx	6–4, 6–3
2015	(France) Grégoire Burquier (France) Alexandre Sidorenko	(Poland) Andriej Kapaś (Japan) Yasutaka Uchiyama	6–3, 6–4
2016	(Australia) Rameez Junaid (Sweden) Andreas Siljeström	(United States) James Cerretani (Netherlands) Antal van der Duim	5–7, 7–6^{(7–4)}, [10–8]
2017	(Germany) Andre Begemann (Denmark) Frederik Nielsen	(Republic of Ireland) David O'Hare (United Kingdom) Joe Salisbury	6–3, 6–4
2018	(Netherlands) Sander Arends (Austria) Tristan-Samuel Weissborn	(United Kingdom) Luke Bambridge (United Kingdom) Joe Salisbury	4–6, 6–1, [10–7]
2019	(Israel) Jonathan Erlich (France) Fabrice Martin	(France) Jonathan Eysseric (Croatia) Antonio Šančić	7–6^{(7–2)}, 7–6^{(7–2)}
2020–2021	Not held		
2022	(Netherlands) Sander Arends (Netherlands) David Pel	(France) Jonathan Eysseric (Netherlands) Robin Haase	6–3, 6–3
2023	(France) Dan Added (France) Albano Olivetti	(Finland) Patrik Niklas-Salminen (Netherlands) Bart Stevens	4–6, 7–6^{(9–7)}, [10–6]
2024	(France) Geoffrey Blancaneaux (France) Gabriel Debru	(Switzerland) Jakub Paul (Czech Republic) Matěj Vocel	3–3, defaulted
2025	Not held		
2026	(Switzerland) Jakub Paul (Czech Republic) Matěj Vocel	(France) Arthur Reymond (France) Luca Sanchez	6–7^{(4–7)}, 7–6^{(7–2)}, [10–5]
