= 2013 Internationaux de Tennis de BLOIS – Singles =

Singles
- 2013 Internationaux de Tennis de BLOIS

Final
- Champion: (Germany) Julian Reister
- Runner-up: (Serbia) Dušan Lajović
- Score: 6–1, 6–7^{(3–7)}, 7–6^{(7–2)}

Events
Singles	Doubles
Internationaux de Tennis de BLOIS	· 2014 →

Julian Reister won the first edition of the event against Dušan Lajović 6–1, 6–7^{(3–7)}, 7–6^{(7–2)}.

== Seeds ==
1. (France) Marc Gicquel (semifinals)
2. (Colombia) Alejandro González (quarterfinals)
3. (Germany) Julian Reister (champion)
4. (Serbia) Dušan Lajović (final)
5. (Chile) Paul Capdeville (semifinals)
6. (France) Josselin Ouanna (withdrew due to a lower back injury)
7. (Spain) Pablo Carreño Busta (quarterfinals)
8. (Argentina) Facundo Bagnis (second round)
9. (Argentina) Guido Andreozzi (quarterfinals)

== Draw ==
=== Key ===
- Q = Qualifier
- WC = Wild card
- LL = Lucky loser
- Alt = Alternate
- SE = Special exempt
- PR = Protected ranking
- ITF = ITF entry
- JE = Junior exempt
- w/o = Walkover
- r = Retired
- d = Defaulted
- SR = Special ranking

=== Finals ===
Semifinals
1	(France) Marc Gicquel	4	3
4	(Serbia) Dušan Lajović	6	6
3	(Germany) Julian Reister	6	7^{7}
5	(Chile) Paul Capdeville	3	6^{5}

Final
4	(Serbia) Dušan Lajović	1	7^{7}	6^{2}
3	(Germany) Julian Reister	6	6^{3}	7^{7}

=== Top half ===
First round
1	(France) M Gicquel	7^{8}	0
(France) V Millot	6^{6}	0^{r}
WC	(France) M Teixeira	6	6
(Spain) Marc Giner	2	0
(France) N Renavand	3	3
(France) D Guez	6	6
Q	(France) Laurent Rochette	3	4
8	(Argentina) F Bagnis	6	6
4	(Serbia) D Lajović	7^{7}	7^{7}
(Brazil) T Alves	6^{5}	6^{3}
(Belgium) N Desein	3	6	6
(Argentina) M Trungelliti	6	2	2
(France) S Robert	6	7^{7}
(Argentina) A Velotti	1	6^{5}
(Italy) G Naso	3	4
7	(Spain) P Carreño Busta	6	6

Second round
1	(France) M Gicquel	3	6	7
WC	(France) M Teixeira	6	2	5
(France) D Guez	6	7^{7}
8	(Argentina) F Bagnis	3	6^{5}
4	(Serbia) D Lajović	6	6
(Belgium) N Desein	3	4
(France) S Robert	6^{3}	6	6^{2}
7	(Spain) P Carreño Busta	7^{7}	3	7^{7}

Quarterfinals
1	(France) M Gicquel	6	6
(France) D Guez	0	3
4	(Serbia) D Lajović	6	1	6
7	(Spain) P Carreño Busta	3	6	1

Semifinals
1	(France) M Gicquel	4	3
4	(Serbia) D Lajović	6	6

=== Bottom half ===
First round
9	(Argentina) G Andreozzi	6	6
WC	(France) A Musialek	2	4
WC	(France) M Rodrigues	7^{7}	1	3
Q	(United Kingdom) A Ward	6^{5}	6	6
(Argentina) R Olivo	6	6
(Netherlands) M Middelkoop	1	2
(Spain) A Menéndez-Maceiras	6^{2}	2
3	(Germany) J Reister	7^{7}	6
5	(Chile) P Capdeville	6	7
(France) J Dasnières de Veigy	0	5
WC	(France) M Hamou	6^{12}	1
Q	(Argentina) M González	7^{14}	6
(France) J Eysseric	6	6
LL	(Colombia) C Salamanca	2	0
Q	(Spain) G Olaso	7	4	4
2	(Colombia) A González	5	6	6

Second round
9	(Argentina) G Andreozzi	6	7^{8}
Q	(United Kingdom) A Ward	2	6^{6}
(Argentina) R Olivo	2	6^{7}
3	(Germany) J Reister	6	7^{9}
5	(Chile) P Capdeville	7	6
Q	(Argentina) M González	5	3
(France) J Eysseric	6	0	4
2	(Colombia) A González	1	6	6

Quarterfinals
9	(Argentina) G Andreozzi	3	6	4
3	(Germany) J Reister	6	3	6
5	(Chile) P Capdeville	7^{7}	6
2	(Colombia) A González	6^{3}	1

Semifinals
3	(Germany) J Reister	6	7^{7}
5	(Chile) P Capdeville	3	6^{5}
