= 2016 Internationaux de Tennis de Blois – Doubles =

Doubles
- 2016 Internationaux de Tennis de Blois

Final
- Champions: (Germany) Alexander Satschko (Germany) Simon Stadler
- Runners-up: (China) Gong Maoxin (Japan) Yasutaka Uchiyama
- Score: 6–3, 7–6^{(7–2)}

Events
Singles	Doubles
← 2015 ·	Internationaux de Tennis de Blois	· 2017 →

Rémi Boutillier and Maxime Teixeira were the defending champions, but only Teixeira defended his title partnering Maxime Chazal. Teixeira lost in the first round to Alejandro González and Luis David Martínez.

Alexander Satschko and Simon Stadler won the title after defeating Gong Maoxin and Yasutaka Uchiyama 6–3, 7–6^{(7–2)} in the final.

== Seeds ==
1. (South Africa) Dean O'Brien / (South Africa) Ruan Roelofse (semifinals)
2. (Netherlands) Thiemo de Bakker / (Netherlands) Antal van der Duim (semifinals)
3. (Chinese Taipei) Peng Hsien-yin / (China) Zhang Ze (first round)
4. (France) Jonathan Eysseric / (France) Alexandre Sidorenko (first round, withdrew)

== Draw ==
=== Key ===
- Q = Qualifier
- WC = Wild card
- LL = Lucky loser
- Alt = Alternate
- SE = Special exempt
- PR = Protected ranking
- ITF = ITF entry
- JE = Junior exempt
- w/o = Walkover
- r = Retired
- d = Defaulted
- SR = Special ranking

First round
1	(South Africa) D O'Brien (South Africa) R Roelofse	6	6
(Chile) Bastian Malla (India) S Nagal	1	3
WC	(Republic of Ireland) D Glancy (Netherlands) S Griekspoor	6	6
(Germany) A Beck (Republic of Ireland) J McGee	2	2
3	(Chinese Taipei) H-y Peng (China) Z Zhang	5	3
(Brazil) P Bernardi (Brazil) G Clezar	7	6
(China) M Gong (Japan) Y Uchiyama	6	6
WC	(Argentina) Luciano Agustín Fisicaro (Argentina) Jeremias Rocco	1	0
(Colombia) A González (Venezuela) LD Martínez	6	6
(France) M Chazal (France) M Teixeira	3	3
(Germany) A Satschko (Germany) S Stadler	w/o
4	(France) J Eysseric (France) A Sidorenko
(Dominican Republic) J Hernández (Argentina) JP Paz	6	5	[2]
(Australia) S de Waard (Germany) A Mies	4	7	[10]
WC	(France) Clément Dorsemaine (France) Quentin Folliot	2	7	[5]
2	(Netherlands) T de Bakker (Netherlands) A van der Duim	6	5	[10]

Quarterfinals
1	(South Africa) D O'Brien (South Africa) R Roelofse	w/o
WC	(Republic of Ireland) D Glancy (Netherlands) S Griekspoor
(Brazil) P Bernardi (Brazil) G Clezar	6^{7}	3
(China) M Gong (Japan) Y Uchiyama	7^{9}	6
(Colombia) A González (Venezuela) LD Martínez	3	1
(Germany) A Satschko (Germany) S Stadler	6	6
(Australia) S de Waard (Germany) A Mies	2	3
2	(Netherlands) T de Bakker (Netherlands) A van der Duim	6	6

Semifinals
1	(South Africa) D O'Brien (South Africa) R Roelofse	3	2
(China) M Gong (Japan) Y Uchiyama	6	6
(Germany) A Satschko (Germany) S Stadler	7^{7}	7^{7}
2	(Netherlands) T de Bakker (Netherlands) A van der Duim	6^{5}	6^{1}

Final
(China) M Gong (Japan) Y Uchiyama	3	6^{2}
(Germany) A Satschko (Germany) S Stadler	6	7^{7}
