= 2019 Internationaux de Tennis de Blois – Singles =

Singles
- 2019 Internationaux de Tennis de Blois

Final
- Champion: (Portugal) Pedro Sousa
- Runner-up: (Belgium) Kimmer Coppejans
- Score: 4–6, 6–3, 7–6^{(7–4)}

Events
Singles	Doubles
← 2018 ·	Internationaux de Tennis de Blois	· 2022 →

Scott Griekspoor was the defending champion but lost in the second round to Tristan Lamasine.

Pedro Sousa won the title after defeating Kimmer Coppejans 4–6, 6–3, 7–6^{(7–4)} in the final.

== Seeds ==
All seeds receive a bye into the second round.

1. (Portugal) Pedro Sousa (champion)
2. (Spain) Pedro Martínez (third round)
3. (Italy) Lorenzo Giustino (semifinals)
4. (Belgium) Kimmer Coppejans (final)
5. (Argentina) Carlos Berlocq (second round)
6. (Colombia) Daniel Elahi Galán (quarterfinals)
7. (France) Maxime Janvier (withdrew)
8. (Argentina) Federico Coria (third round)
9. (Argentina) Facundo Argüello (semifinals)
10. (France) Constant Lestienne (third round)
11. (France) Mathias Bourgue (withdrew)
12. (Argentina) Pedro Cachin (third round)
13. (Spain) Bernabé Zapata Miralles (third round)
14. (Canada) Steven Diez (third round)
15. (Japan) Kaichi Uchida (second round)
16. (France) Johan Tatlot (quarterfinals)
17. (France) Tristan Lamasine (quarterfinals)

== Draw ==
=== Key ===
- Q = Qualifier
- WC = Wild card
- LL = Lucky loser
- Alt = Alternate
- SE = Special exempt
- PR = Protected ranking
- ITF = ITF entry
- JE = Junior exempt
- w/o = Walkover
- r = Retired
- d = Defaulted
- SR = Special ranking

=== Finals ===
Quarterfinals
1	(Portugal) Pedro Sousa	6	6
17	(France) Tristan Lamasine	1	1
3	(Italy) Lorenzo Giustino	6	6
6	(Colombia) Daniel Elahi Galán	3	1
(Spain) Oriol Roca Batalla	7^{8}	6^{6}	3
4	(Belgium) Kimmer Coppejans	6^{6}	7^{8}	6
9	(Argentina) Facundo Argüello	6	6
16	(France) Johan Tatlot	4	0

Semifinals
1	(Portugal) Pedro Sousa	6	6
3	(Italy) Lorenzo Giustino	4	2
4	(Belgium) Kimmer Coppejans	2	7	6
9	(Argentina) Facundo Argüello	6	5	4

Final
1	(Portugal) Pedro Sousa	4	6	7^{7}
4	(Belgium) Kimmer Coppejans	6	3	6^{4}

=== Top half ===
==== Section 1 ====
First round
(Peru) JP Varillas	6	6
Alt	(Spain) R Ramírez Hidalgo	3	1
Alt	(Brazil) D Dutra da Silva	6	6
ITF	(France) C Denolly	0	4
(Argentina) F Mena	6^{7}	3
(Netherlands) S Griekspoor	7^{9}	6
(France) Antoine Cornut-Chauvinc	1	2
ITF	(Germany) P Torebko	6	6

Second round
1	(Portugal) P Sousa	7^{7}	6
(Peru) JP Varillas	6^{3}	3
Alt	(Brazil) D Dutra da Silva	6	6
15	(Japan) K Uchida	4	4
17	(France) T Lamasine	7^{7}	6
(Netherlands) S Griekspoor	6^{5}	4
ITF	(Germany) P Torebko	3	4
8	(Argentina) F Coria	6	6

Third round
1	(Portugal) P Sousa	6	6
Alt	(Brazil) D Dutra da Silva	4	0
17	(France) T Lamasine	6	7^{8}
8	(Argentina) F Coria	4	6^{6}

Quarterfinals
1	(Portugal) P Sousa	6	6
17	(France) T Lamasine	1	1

==== Section 2 ====
First round
(France) A Müller	3	6	6
(Netherlands) J Sels	6	4	3
LL	(France) Youlian Iakovlev	1	1
(France) M Guinard	6	6
WC	(Denmark) H Rune	6	3	6
PR	(Colombia) N Barrientos	1	6	3
WC	(France) Enzo Wallart	6	2	6^{5}
WC	(France) M Martineau	4	6	7^{7}

Second round
3	(Italy) L Giustino	3	6	6
(France) A Müller	6	4	4
(France) M Guinard	4	3
14	(Canada) S Diez	6	6
10	(France) C Lestienne	6	6
WC	(Denmark) H Rune	4	3
WC	(France) M Martineau	3	6^{3}
6	(Colombia) DE Galán	6	7^{7}

Third round
3	(Italy) L Giustino	7^{7}	3	7^{7}
14	(Canada) S Diez	6^{4}	6	6^{3}
10	(France) C Lestienne	4	4
6	(Colombia) DE Galán	6	6

Quarterfinals
3	(Italy) L Giustino	6	6
6	(Colombia) DE Galán	3	1

=== Bottom half ===
==== Section 3 ====
First round
(Spain) O Roca Batalla	7^{8}	6
WC	(France) Samuel Brosset	6^{6}	2
(Spain) R Ortega Olmedo	6	6
(France) K de Schepper	3	4
(France) S Doumbia	3	2
ITF	(Netherlands) B van de Zandschulp	6	6
Q	(Netherlands) M Vervoort	1	1
Alt	(France) J Eysseric	6	6

Second round
5	(Argentina) C Berlocq	4	4
(Spain) O Roca Batalla	6	6
(Spain) R Ortega Olmedo	0	2
12	(Argentina) P Cachin	6	6
13	(Spain) B Zapata Miralles	4	6	6
ITF	(Netherlands) B van de Zandschulp	6	1	4
Alt	(France) J Eysseric	1	3
4	(Belgium) K Coppejans	6	6

Third round
(Spain) O Roca Batalla	3	7	7
12	(Argentina) P Cachin	6	5	5
13	(Spain) B Zapata Miralles	3	6	4
4	(Belgium) K Coppejans	6	3	6

Quarterfinals
(Spain) O Roca Batalla	7^{8}	6^{6}	3
4	(Belgium) K Coppejans	6^{6}	7^{8}	6

==== Section 4 ====
First round
(Brazil) P Sakamoto	3	6	4
(France) G Blancaneaux	6	3	6
ITF	(France) A Rinderknech	6	7^{8}
(Argentina) R Olivo	4	6^{6}
ITF	(Netherlands) T van Rijthoven	4	4
WC	(France) M Hamou	6	6
(Dominican Republic) J Hernández-Fernández	4	6	6
(Germany) Marvin Netuschil	6	4	3

Second round
Q	(Peru) S Galdós	2	0
(France) G Blancaneaux	6	6
ITF	(France) A Rinderknech	2	6	1
9	(Argentina) F Argüello	6	2	6
16	(France) J Tatlot	6	6
WC	(France) M Hamou	3	4
(Dominican Republic) J Hernández-Fernández	4	5
2	(Spain) P Martínez	6	7

Third round
(France) G Blancaneaux	6	4	3
9	(Argentina) F Argüello	4	6	6
16	(France) J Tatlot	1	7^{7}	7
2	(Spain) P Martínez	6	6^{4}	5

Quarterfinals
9	(Argentina) F Argüello	6	6
16	(France) J Tatlot	4	0
