= 2016 Internationaux de Tennis de Blois – Singles =

Singles
- 2016 Internationaux de Tennis de Blois

Final
- Champion: (Argentina) Carlos Berlocq
- Runner-up: (Belgium) Steve Darcis
- Score: 6–2, 6–0

Events
Singles	Doubles
← 2015 ·	Internationaux de Tennis de Blois	· 2017 →

Mathias Bourgue was the defending champion, but lost in the first round to Scott Griekspoor.

Carlos Berlocq won the title after defeating Steve Darcis 6–2, 6–0 in the final.

== Seeds ==
1. (Spain) Albert Montañés (first round)
2. (Argentina) Carlos Berlocq (champion)
3. (Netherlands) Thiemo de Bakker (first round)
4. (Brazil) Thiago Monteiro (second round, withdrew)
5. (Colombia) Alejandro González (first round)
6. (Belgium) Steve Darcis (final)
7. (France) Mathias Bourgue (first round)
8. (China) Zhang Ze (quarterfinals, retired)

== Draw ==
=== Key ===
- Q = Qualifier
- WC = Wild card
- LL = Lucky loser
- Alt = Alternate
- SE = Special exempt
- PR = Protected ranking
- ITF = ITF entry
- JE = Junior exempt
- w/o = Walkover
- r = Retired
- d = Defaulted
- SR = Special ranking

=== Finals ===
Semifinals
(Netherlands) Antal van der Duim	5	6^{1}
6	(Belgium) Steve Darcis	7	7^{7}
(France) Grégoire Barrère	2	3
2	(Argentina) Carlos Berlocq	6	6

Final
6	(Belgium) Steve Darcis	2	0
2	(Argentina) Carlos Berlocq	6	6

=== Top half ===
First round
1	(Spain) A Montañés	6	6^{5}	4
(Brazil) G Clezar	4	7^{7}	6
(Netherlands) A van der Duim	1	6	6
(Belgium) Y Reuter	6	2	2
(Sweden) C Lindell	2^{r}
WC	(France) M Teixeira	5
LL	(Japan) Y Uchiyama	4	4
8	(China) Z Zhang	6	6
3	(Netherlands) T de Bakker	7	3	3
Q	(Germany) A Beck	5	6	6
(France) M Chazal	3	3
(Switzerland) H Laaksonen	6	6
WC	(France) J Tatlot	7	6^{0}	3
(Spain) J Samper-Montaña	5	7^{7}	6
(Russia) I Nedelko	2	5
6	(Belgium) S Darcis	6	7

Second round
(Brazil) G Clezar	1	4
(Netherlands) A van der Duim	6	6
WC	(France) M Teixeira	3	6	4
8	(China) Z Zhang	6	1	6
Q	(Germany) A Beck	6	6
(Switzerland) H Laaksonen	3	4
(Spain) J Samper-Montaña	2	2
6	(Belgium) S Darcis	6	6

Quarterfinals
(Netherlands) A van der Duim	6	4
8	(China) Z Zhang	2	1^{r}
Q	(Germany) A Beck	2	0
6	(Belgium) S Darcis	6	6

Semifinals
(Netherlands) A van der Duim	5	6^{1}
6	(Belgium) S Darcis	7	7^{7}

=== Bottom half ===
First round
5	(Colombia) A González	4	6	4
(Canada) S Diez	6	2	6
(France) G Barrère	6	6
(United States) T Paul	2	4
(Serbia) M Zekić	7^{7}	6^{3}	6
(France) G Sakharov	6^{5}	7^{7}	1
(France) C Hemery	5	3
4	(Brazil) T Monteiro	7	6
7	(France) M Bourgue	6^{4}	6	3
Q	(Netherlands) S Griekspoor	7^{7}	4	6
Q	(Argentina) JP Paz	6	5	6
WC	(France) H Grenier	1	7	4
WC	(France) J Eysseric	3	6^{3}
(France) T Lamasine	6	7^{7}
Q	(Dominican Republic) J Hernández	3	4
2	(Argentina) C Berlocq	6	6

Second round
(Canada) S Diez	6	1	1
(France) G Barrère	4	6	6
(Serbia) M Zekić	w/o
4	(Brazil) T Monteiro
Q	(Netherlands) S Griekspoor	6	6
Q	(Argentina) JP Paz	3	4
(France) T Lamasine	4	2
2	(Argentina) C Berlocq	6	6

Quarterfinals
(France) G Barrère	6	7^{7}
(Serbia) M Zekić	2	6^{5}
Q	(Netherlands) S Griekspoor	3	4
2	(Argentina) C Berlocq	6	6

Semifinals
(France) G Barrère	2	3
2	(Argentina) C Berlocq	6	6
