= 2013 Internationaux de Tennis de BLOIS =

- Date: 10–16 June
- Edition: 1st
- Draw: 32S / 16D
- Prize money: €30,000+H
- Surface: Clay
- Location: Blois, France

Champions

Singles
- (Germany) Julian Reister

Doubles
- (France) Jonathan Eysseric / (France) Nicolas Renavand
Internationaux de Tennis de BLOIS	· 2014 →

The 2013 Internationaux de Tennis de BLOIS is a professional tennis tournament played on clay courts. It is the first edition of the tournament which is part of the 2013 ATP Challenger Tour. It takes place in Blois, France between 10 and 16 June 2013.

== Singles main draw entrants ==
=== Seeds ===
Country	Player	Rank^{1}	Seed
FRA	Marc Gicquel	126	1
COL	Alejandro González	147	2
GER	Julian Reister	150	3
SRB	Dušan Lajović	155	4
CHI	Paul Capdeville	156	5
~~FRA~~	~~Josselin Ouanna~~	~~157~~	~~6~~
ESP	Pablo Carreño Busta	164	7
ARG	Facundo Bagnis	165	8
ARG	Guido Andreozzi	167	9

- ^{1} Rankings are as of May 27, 2013.

=== Other entrants ===
The following players received wildcards into the singles main draw:

- (France) Maxime Hamou
- (France) Alexis Musialek
- (France) Mathieu Rodrigues
- (France) Maxime Teixeira

The following players received entry from the qualifying draw:

- (Argentina) Máximo González
- (Spain) Guillermo Olaso
- (France) Laurent Rochette
- (United Kingdom) Alexander Ward

The following player received entry as a lucky loser:

- (Colombia) Carlos Salamanca

== Champions ==
=== Singles ===
- (Germany) Julian Reister def. (Serbia) Dušan Lajović 6–1, 6–7^{(3–7)}, 7–6^{(7–2)}

=== Doubles ===
- (France) Jonathan Eysseric / (France) Nicolas Renavand def. (Philippines) Ruben Gonzales / (Australia) Chris Letcher 6–3, 6–4
