= 2015 Internationaux de Tennis de Blois – Singles =

Singles
- 2015 Internationaux de Tennis de Blois

Final
- Champion: (France) Mathias Bourgue
- Runner-up: (Spain) Daniel Muñoz de la Nava
- Score: 2–6, 6–4, 6–2

Events
Singles	Doubles
- Internationaux de Tennis de Blois

Máximo González was the defending champion, but withdrew from the tournament in the quarterfinals.

Mathias Bourgue won the tournament defeating Daniel Muñoz de la Nava in the final, 2–6, 6–4, 6–2.

== Seeds ==
1. (Argentina) Máximo González (quarterfinals, withdrew)
2. (Colombia) Alejandro González (semifinals)
3. (Spain) Daniel Muñoz de la Nava (final)
4. (Argentina) Horacio Zeballos (quarterfinals)
5. (Portugal) Gastão Elias (first round)
6. (Argentina) Renzo Olivo (quarterfinals)
7. (Brazil) Guilherme Clezar (second round)
8. (Sweden) Christian Lindell (quarterfinals)

== Draw ==
Key

- Q = Qualifier
- WC = Wild card
- LL = Lucky loser
- Alt = Alternate
- ITF = ITF entry
- PR = Protected ranking
- SR = Special ranking
- SE = Special exempt
- JE = Junior exempt
- JR = Junior Accelerator Programme entrant
- CO = College Accelerator Programme entrant
- NG = Next Gen Accelerator Program entrant
- w/o = Walkover
- r = Retired
- d = Defaulted

=== Finals ===
Semifinals
(France) Mathias Bourgue	6	6
WC	(France) Calvin Hemery	2	3
3	(Spain) Daniel Muñoz de la Nava	6	4	6
2	(Colombia) Alejandro González	4	6	4

Final
(France) Mathias Bourgue	2	6	6
3	(Spain) Daniel Muñoz de la Nava	6	4	2

=== Top half ===
First round
1	(Argentina) M González	3	6	6
WC	(Spain) J Munar	6	3	3
(Belgium) A De Greef	6	7
Alt	(Portugal) P Sousa	2	5
(France) M Bourgue	6	6
(France) D Guez	2	2
(France) V Millot	6	6
5	(Portugal) G Elias	1	3
4	(Argentina) H Zeballos	6	6
(France) A Musialek	2	4
(France) T Lamasine	3	6	6
(France) J Eysseric	6	3	2
Q	(Canada) F Peliwo	6	4	6^{3}
WC	(France) C Hemery	3	6	7^{7}
LL	(Ecuador) G Escobar	6	4	6^{2}
7	(Brazil) G Clezar	3	6	7^{7}

Second round
1	(Argentina) M González	6	6
(Belgium) A De Greef	3	2
(France) M Bourgue	4	6	7
(France) V Millot	6	1	5
4	(Argentina) H Zeballos	6	6
(France) T Lamasine	2	3
WC	(France) C Hemery	6	4	6
7	(Brazil) G Clezar	4	6	2

Quarterfinals
1	(Argentina) M González	w/o
(France) M Bourgue
4	(Argentina) H Zeballos	5	7^{7}	3
WC	(France) C Hemery	7	6^{4}	6

Semifinals
(France) M Bourgue	6	6
WC	(France) C Hemery	2	3

=== Bottom half ===
First round
6	(Argentina) R Olivo	6	3	6
Q	(France) Maxime Tabatruong	3	6	1
Q	(Brazil) R Dutra Silva	6^{1}	5
(France) G Mina	7^{7}	6
(Argentina) N Kicker	6	6^{4}	1
Q	(France) G Sakharov	2	7^{7}	6
WC	(France) S Robert	3	6	1
3	(Spain) D Muñoz de la Nava	6	3	6
8	(Sweden) C Lindell	6	3	7
(France) R Boutillier	3	6	5
(Ecuador) G Lapentti	6	1	1
(Spain) J Samper-Montaña	2	6	6
WC	(France) J Tatlot	6	3	6
(France) M Hamou	4	6	3
(Belgium) Y Mertens	4	2
2	(Colombia) A González	6	6

Second round
6	(Argentina) R Olivo	5	6	7^{7}
(France) G Mina	7	4	6^{2}
Q	(France) G Sakharov	3	3
3	(Spain) D Muñoz de la Nava	6	6
8	(Sweden) C Lindell	6	2	6
(Spain) J Samper-Montaña	3	6	4
WC	(France) J Tatlot	4	2
2	(Colombia) A González	6	6

Quarterfinals
6	(Argentina) R Olivo	3	4
3	(Spain) D Muñoz de la Nava	6	6
8	(Sweden) C Lindell	3	5
2	(Colombia) A González	6	7

Semifinals
3	(Spain) D Muñoz de la Nava	6	4	6
2	(Colombia) A González	4	6	4
