= 2013 Internationaux de Tennis de BLOIS – Doubles =

Doubles
- 2013 Internationaux de Tennis de BLOIS

Final
- Champions: (France) Jonathan Eysseric (France) Nicolas Renavand
- Runners-up: (Philippines) Ruben Gonzales (Australia) Chris Letcher
- Score: 6–3, 6–4

Events
Singles	Doubles
Internationaux de Tennis de BLOIS	· 2014 →

This is the first edition of the event. Jonathan Eysseric and Nicolas Renavand defeated Ruben Gonzales and Chris Letcher in the final and take the title.

== Seeds ==
1. (Philippines) Ruben Gonzales / (Australia) Chris Letcher (final)
2. (France) Jonathan Eysseric / (France) Nicolas Renavand (champions)
3. (Netherlands) Stephan Fransen / (Netherlands) Matwé Middelkoop (semifinals)
4. (Colombia) Alejandro González / (Colombia) Carlos Salamanca (first round)

== Draw ==
=== Key ===
- Q = Qualifier
- WC = Wild card
- LL = Lucky loser
- Alt = Alternate
- SE = Special exempt
- PR = Protected ranking
- ITF = ITF entry
- JE = Junior exempt
- w/o = Walkover
- r = Retired
- d = Defaulted
- SR = Special ranking

=== Draw ===
First round
1	(Philippines) R Gonzales (Australia) Chris Letcher	6	6
(France) G Burquier (New Zealand) A Sitak	4	4
(Chile) Bastián Malla (France) M Teixeira	w/o
(France) D Guez (France) V Millot
4	(Colombia) A González (Colombia) C Salamanca	4	6	[4]
(France) S Robert (France) Fabien Robert	6	4	[10]
WC	(Argentina) Gustavo Cavallaro (Argentina) Andrés Schneiter	6	6
WC	(France) Vincent Meyer (France) M Rodrigues	1	1
(United Kingdom) O Golding (United Kingdom) A Ward	4	4
(Spain) G Granollers (Spain) G Olaso	6	6
(Brazil) T Alves (Chile) P Capdeville	1	6	[6]
3	(Netherlands) S Fransen (Netherlands) M Middelkoop	6	3	[10]
WC	(Argentina) Javier Fernández (Argentina) Juan Pablo Guzmán	3	5
(Spain) Marc Giner (France) Rodolphe Mouveau	6	7
(Argentina) G Andreozzi (Argentina) A Velotti
2	(France) J Eysseric (France) N Renavand	w/o

Quarterfinals
1	(Philippines) R Gonzales (Australia) C Letcher	7	6
(Chile) B Malla (France) M Teixeira	5	3
(France) S Robert (France) F Robert	6	6
WC	(Argentina) G Cavallaro (Argentina) A Schneiter	4	1
(Spain) G Granollers (Spain) G Olaso	2	4
3	(Netherlands) S Fransen (Netherlands) M Middelkoop	6	6
(Spain) M Giner (France) R Mouveau
2	(France) J Eysseric (France) N Renavand	w/o

Semifinals
1	(Philippines) R Gonzales (Australia) C Letcher	6	6
(France) S Robert (France) F Robert	0	3
3	(Netherlands) S Fransen (Netherlands) M Middelkoop	1	2
2	(France) J Eysseric (France) N Renavand	6	6

Final
1	(Philippines) R Gonzales (Australia) C Letcher	3	4
2	(France) J Eysseric (France) N Renavand	6	6
