= 2016 Internationaux de Tennis de Blois =

- Date: 13–19 June
- Edition: 4th
- Draw: 32S / 16D
- Prize money: €42,500+H
- Surface: Clay
- Location: Blois, France

Champions

Singles
- (Argentina) Carlos Berlocq

Doubles
- (Germany) Alexander Satschko / (Germany) Simon Stadler
← 2015 ·	Internationaux de Tennis de Blois	· 2017 →

The 2016 Internationaux de Tennis de Blois was a professional tennis tournament played on clay courts. It was the fourth edition of the tournament which was part of the 2016 ATP Challenger Tour. It took place in Blois, France between 13 and 19 June 2016.

== Singles main-draw entrants ==
=== Seeds ===
Country	Player	Rank^{1}	Seed
ESP	Albert Montañés	103	1
ARG	Carlos Berlocq	124	2
NED	Thiemo de Bakker	126	3
BRA	Thiago Monteiro	138	4
COL	Alejandro González	143	5
BEL	Steve Darcis	145	6
FRA	Mathias Bourgue	153	7
CHN	Zhang Ze	174	8

- ^{1} Rankings are as of June 6, 2016.

=== Other entrants ===
The following players received wildcards into the singles main draw:

- (France) Jonathan Eysseric
- (France) Hugo Grenier
- (France) Johan Tatlot
- (France) Maxime Teixeira

The following players received entry from the qualifying draw:

- (Germany) Andreas Beck
- (Netherlands) Scott Griekspoor
- (Dominican Republic) José Hernández
- (Argentina) Juan Pablo Paz

The following player received entry as a lucky loser:

- (Japan) Yasutaka Uchiyama

== Champions ==
=== Singles ===
- (Argentina) Carlos Berlocq def. (Belgium) Steve Darcis, 6–2, 6–0

=== Doubles ===
- (Germany) Alexander Satschko / (Germany) Simon Stadler def. (China) Gong Maoxin / (Japan) Yasutaka Uchiyama, 6–3, 7–6^{(7–2)}
