= 2018 Internationaux de Tennis de Blois – Doubles =

Doubles
- 2018 Internationaux de Tennis de Blois

Final
- Champions: (Brazil) Fabrício Neis; (Spain) David Vega Hernández
- Runners-up: (Chinese Taipei) Hsieh Cheng-peng; (Australia) Rameez Junaid
- Score: 7–6^{(7–4)}, 6–1

Events
Singles	Doubles
← 2017 ·	Internationaux de Tennis de Blois	· 2019 →

Sander Gillé and Joran Vliegen were the defending champions but chose not to defend their title.

Fabrício Neis and David Vega Hernández won the title after defeating Hsieh Cheng-peng and Rameez Junaid 7–6^{(7–4)}, 6–1 in the final.

== Seeds ==
1. (Monaco) Romain Arneodo / (Peru) Sergio Galdós (first round)
2. (South Africa) Ruan Roelofse / (Indonesia) Christopher Rungkat (quarterfinals)
3. (Chinese Taipei) Hsieh Cheng-peng / (Australia) Rameez Junaid (final)
4. (Venezuela) Roberto Maytín / (Sweden) Andreas Siljeström (first round)

== Draw ==
=== Key ===
- Q = Qualifier
- WC = Wild card
- LL = Lucky loser
- Alt = Alternate
- SE = Special exempt
- PR = Protected ranking
- ITF = ITF entry
- JE = Junior exempt
- w/o = Walkover
- r = Retired
- d = Defaulted
- SR = Special ranking

First round

Quarterfinals

Semifinals

Final

1
- (Monaco) R Arneodo
- (Peru) S Galdós
6
3
[7]

- (Argentina) T Lipovšek Puches
- (Argentina) JI Londero
3
6
[10]

- (Argentina) T Lipovšek Puches
- (Argentina) JI Londero
7^{7}
6

WC
- (France) C Denolly
- (France) A Müller
6
7^{7}

WC
- (France) C Denolly
- (France) A Müller
6^{1}
2

WC
(France) Jaimee Floyd Angele
(France) Tom Jomby
2
6^{2}

- (Argentina) T Lipovšek Puches
- (Argentina) JI Londero

3
- (Chinese Taipei) C-p Hsieh
- (Australia) R Junaid
7
6

3
- (Chinese Taipei) C-p Hsieh
- (Australia) R Junaid
w/o

- (Argentina) P Cachin
- (Spain) D Gimeno Traver
5
4

3
- (Chinese Taipei) C-p Hsieh
- (Australia) R Junaid
6
7

Alt
- (Portugal) João Monteiro
- (Portugal) B Saraiva
0
1

- (France) B Bonzi
- (France) G Jacq
2
5

- (France) B Bonzi
- (France) G Jacq
6
6

3
- (Chinese Taipei) C-p Hsieh
- (Australia) R Junaid
6^{4}
1

- (Italy) L Giustino
- (Spain) M Vilella Martínez
4
1

- (Brazil) F Neis
- (Spain) D Vega Hernández
7^{7}
6

- (Finland) H Heliövaara
- (Switzerland) H Laaksonen
6
6

- (Finland) H Heliövaara
- (Switzerland) H Laaksonen
3
3

- (Portugal) J Domingues
- (Portugal) P Sousa
6
6

- (Portugal) J Domingues
- (Portugal) P Sousa
6
6

4
- (Venezuela) R Maytín
- (Sweden) A Siljeström
4
3

- (Portugal) J Domingues
- (Portugal) P Sousa
3
7^{12}
[8]

- (Brazil) F Neis
- (Spain) D Vega Hernández
6
7

- (Brazil) F Neis
- (Spain) D Vega Hernández
6
6^{10}
[10]

WC
- (France) M Bourgue
- (France) A Musialek
4
5

- (Brazil) F Neis
- (Spain) D Vega Hernández
6
6

- (Mexico) H Hach Verdugo
- (Venezuela) LD Martínez
2
4

2
- (South Africa) R Roelofse
- (Indonesia) C Rungkat
3
3

2
- (South Africa) R Roelofse
- (Indonesia) C Rungkat
6
6
