= 2018 Internationaux de Tennis de Blois – Singles =

Singles
- 2018 Internationaux de Tennis de Blois

Final
- Champion: (Netherlands) Scott Griekspoor
- Runner-up: (Canada) Félix Auger-Aliassime
- Score: 6–4, 6–4

Events
Singles	Doubles
← 2017 ·	Internationaux de Tennis de Blois	· 2019 →

Damir Džumhur was the defending champion but chose not to defend his title.

Scott Griekspoor won the title after defeating Félix Auger-Aliassime 6–4, 6–4 in the final.

== Seeds ==
1. (Portugal) Pedro Sousa (first round)
2. (France) Calvin Hemery (withdrew)
3. (Switzerland) Henri Laaksonen (second round)
4. (Argentina) Juan Ignacio Londero (quarterfinals)
5. (Canada) Félix Auger-Aliassime (final)
6. (Argentina) Carlos Berlocq (second round)
7. (France) Stéphane Robert (semifinals)
8. (Chile) Christian Garín (quarterfinals)

== Draw ==
=== Key ===
- Q = Qualifier
- WC = Wild card
- LL = Lucky loser
- Alt = Alternate
- SE = Special exempt
- PR = Protected ranking
- ITF = ITF entry
- JE = Junior exempt
- w/o = Walkover
- r = Retired
- d = Defaulted
- SR = Special ranking

=== Finals ===
Semifinals
5	(Canada) Félix Auger-Aliassime	7^{7}	3	6
(Netherlands) Thiemo de Bakker	6^{2}	6	1
(Netherlands) Scott Griekspoor	6	2	6
7/WC	(France) Stéphane Robert	1	6	2

Final
5	(Canada) Félix Auger-Aliassime	4	4
(Netherlands) Scott Griekspoor	6	6

=== Top half ===
First round
1	(Portugal) P Sousa	3	4
Q	(France) T Lamasine	6	6
Q	(Sweden) M Ymer	2	3
(France) K de Schepper	6	6
(Spain) D Gimeno Traver	6	3	3
Q	(Chile) MT Barrios Vera	2	6	6
(Italy) A Basso	3	2
5	(Canada) F Auger-Aliassime	6	6
3	(Switzerland) H Laaksonen	7	2
(France) E Benchetrit	5	1^{r}
(Netherlands) T de Bakker	6	6
(Portugal) João Monteiro	2	2
(France) B Bonzi	2	3
(France) M Janvier	6	6
WC	(France) Jaimee Floyd Angele	3	5
8	(Chile) C Garín	6	7

Second round
Q	(France) T Lamasine	6	1	6
(France) K de Schepper	4	6	1
Q	(Chile) MT Barrios Vera	3	4
5	(Canada) F Auger-Aliassime	6	6
3	(Switzerland) H Laaksonen	6^{3}	4
(Netherlands) T de Bakker	7^{7}	6
(France) M Janvier	2	2
8	(Chile) C Garín	6	6

Quarterfinals
Q	(France) T Lamasine	4	2
5	(Canada) F Auger-Aliassime	6	6
(Netherlands) T de Bakker	6	6
8	(Chile) C Garín	4	4

Semifinals
5	(Canada) F Auger-Aliassime	7^{7}	3	6
(Netherlands) T de Bakker	6^{2}	6	1

=== Bottom half ===
First round
6	(Argentina) C Berlocq	3	6	7^{7}
Q	(France) Jules Okala	6	1	6^{5}
(Netherlands) S Griekspoor	6	6
(Italy) L Giustino	4	1
(France) M Bourgue	4	6	4
(France) C Lestienne	6	2	1^{r}
(Portugal) J Domingues	3	4
4	(Argentina) JI Londero	6	6
7/WC	(France) S Robert	6	7^{7}
(Spain) M Vilella Martínez	4	6^{4}
SE	(Italy) R Marcora	6	6
WC	(France) A Müller	1	3
SE	(France) J Tatlot	2^{r}
(Argentina) P Cachin	5
(Portugal) F Ferreira Silva	6	5	6^{6}
LL	(Finland) H Heliövaara	3	7	7^{8}

Second round
6	(Argentina) C Berlocq	6	6^{5}	4
(Netherlands) S Griekspoor	3	7^{7}	6
(France) M Bourgue	5	6^{3}
4	(Argentina) JI Londero	7	7^{7}
7/WC	(France) S Robert	6^{4}	6	6
SE	(Italy) R Marcora	7^{7}	3	3
(Argentina) P Cachin	6^{9}	7^{8}	6
LL	(Finland) H Heliövaara	7^{11}	6^{6}	2

Quarterfinals
(Netherlands) S Griekspoor	6	5	7
4	(Argentina) JI Londero	2	7	5
7/WC	(France) S Robert	6	6
(Argentina) P Cachin	3	0

Semifinals
(Netherlands) S Griekspoor	6	2	6
7/WC	(France) S Robert	1	6	2
