= 2023 Internationaux de Tennis de Blois – Singles =

Singles
- 2023 Internationaux de Tennis de Blois

Final
- Champion: (France) Quentin Halys
- Runner-up: (France) Kyrian Jacquet
- Score: 4–6, 6–2, 2–0 ret.

Events
Singles	Doubles
← 2022 ·	Internationaux de Tennis de Blois	· 2024 →

Alexandre Müller was the defending champion but chose not to defend his title.

Quentin Halys won the title after Kyrian Jacquet retired in the final. Halys led 4–6, 6–2, 2–0 at the time of retirement.

== Seeds ==
1. (France) Quentin Halys (champion)
2. (Spain) Pedro Martínez (second round)
3. (Kazakhstan) Timofey Skatov (first round)
4. (Brazil) Felipe Meligeni Alves (withdrew)
5. (Belgium) Kimmer Coppejans (second round)
6. (France) Harold Mayot (quarterfinals)
7. (Sweden) Dragoș Nicolae Mădăraș (first round)
8. Evgeny Donskoy (first round)

== Draw ==
=== Key ===
- Q = Qualifier
- WC = Wild card
- LL = Lucky loser
- Alt = Alternate
- ITF = ITF entry
- PR = Protected ranking
- SR = Special ranking
- SE = Special exempt
- JE = Junior exempt
- JR = Junior Accelerator Programme entrant
- CO = College Accelerator Programme entrant
- NG = Next Gen Accelerator Program entrant
- w/o = Walkover
- r = Retired
- d = Defaulted

=== Finals ===
Semifinals
1	(France) Quentin Halys	6	7^{7}
(Lebanon) Benjamin Hassan	1	6^{3}
Q	(France) Kyrian Jacquet	6	6
Q	(Spain) Nikolás Sánchez Izquierdo	3	3

Final
1	(France) Quentin Halys	4	6	2
Q	(France) Kyrian Jacquet	6	2	0^{r}

=== Top half ===
First round
1	(France) Q Halys	7	6
(France) T Atmane	5	4
(Belgium) G-A Bailly	5	1
(Italy) G Mager	7	6
WC	(France) M Bourgue	4	5
(Argentina) R Olivo	6	7
Alt	(Romania) FC Jianu	5	2
5	(Belgium) K Coppejans	7	6
3	(Kazakhstan) T Skatov	6^{5}	4
WC	(France) A Géa	7^{7}	6
(Lebanon) B Hassan	7^{9}	7
(Mexico) R Pacheco Méndez	6^{7}	5
(France) D Added	4	4
(Belgium) M Geerts	6	6
WC	(France) C Tabur	3	4
6	(France) H Mayot	6	6

Second round
1	(France) Q Halys	6	7^{7}
(Italy) G Mager	3	6^{5}
(Argentina) R Olivo	6	3	6
5	(Belgium) K Coppejans	1	6	1
WC	(France) A Géa	2	3
(Lebanon) B Hassan	6	6
(Belgium) M Geerts	1	5
6	(France) H Mayot	6	7

Quarterfinals
1	(France) Q Halys	6	6
(Argentina) R Olivo	2	2
(Lebanon) B Hassan	7^{7}	6
6	(France) H Mayot	6^{1}	3

Semifinals
1	(France) Q Halys	6	7^{7}
(Lebanon) B Hassan	1	6^{3}

=== Bottom half ===
First round
7	(Sweden) DN Mădăraș	4	3
Q	(France) K Jacquet	6	6
Alt	(Bolivia) M Dellien	6	7
Q	(United States) A Michelsen	3	5
(Brazil) M Pucinelli de Almeida	6^{3}	7^{7}	4
Q	(France) U Blanchet	7^{7}	6^{3}	6
(Spain) Á López San Martín	4	3
LL	(France) C Hemery	6	6
8	E Donskoy	6	6^{5}	1
(Argentina) H Casanova	1	7^{7}	6
Q	(France) K de Schepper	6	4	6
(Spain) A Moro Cañas	4	6	2
(Germany) Elmar Ejupovic	7^{7}	4	1
Q	(Spain) N Sánchez Izquierdo	6^{2}	6	6
Q	(Spain) D Rincón	3	3
2	(Spain) P Martínez	6	6

Second round
Q	(France) K Jacquet	6	6
Alt	(Bolivia) M Dellien	4	3
Q	(France) U Blanchet	7^{10}	1	6
LL	(France) C Hemery	6^{8}	6	3
(Argentina) H Casanova	6^{2}	7	6^{3}
Q	(France) K de Schepper	7^{7}	5	7^{7}
Q	(Spain) N Sánchez Izquierdo	6	6
2	(Spain) P Martínez	4	3

Quarterfinals
Q	(France) K Jacquet	6	6
Q	(France) U Blanchet	3	3
Q	(France) K de Schepper	6	3	6^{5}
Q	(Spain) N Sánchez Izquierdo	3	6	7^{7}

Semifinals
Q	(France) K Jacquet	6	6
Q	(Spain) N Sánchez Izquierdo	3	3
