= 2014 Internationaux de Tennis de Blois – Doubles =

Doubles
- 2014 Internationaux de Tennis de Blois

Final
- Champion: (France) Tristan Lamasine (France) Laurent Lokoli
- Runner-up: (Argentina) Guillermo Durán (Argentina) Máximo González
- Score: 7–5, 6–0

Events
Singles	Doubles
← 2013 ·	Internationaux de Tennis de Blois	· 2015 →

Jonathan Eysseric and Nicolas Renavand were the defending champions, but chose not to compete.

Tristan Lamasine and Laurent Lokoli won the title, defeating Guillermo Durán and Máximo González in the final, 7–5, 6–0.

== Seeds ==
1. (Argentina) Guillermo Durán / (Argentina) Máximo González (final)
2. (Philippines) Ruben Gonzales / (Venezuela) Roberto Maytín (quarterfinals)
3. (Australia) Jordan Kerr / (France) Fabrice Martin (Quarterfinals)
4. (Dominican Republic) José Hernández / (Argentina) Andrés Molteni (first round)

== Draw ==
=== Key ===
- Q = Qualifier
- WC = Wild card
- LL = Lucky loser
- Alt = Alternate
- ITF = ITF entry
- PR = Protected ranking
- SR = Special ranking
- SE = Special exempt
- JE = Junior exempt
- JR = Junior Accelerator Programme entrant
- CO = College Accelerator Programme entrant
- NG = Next Gen Accelerator Program entrant
- w/o = Walkover
- r = Retired
- d = Defaulted

=== Draw ===
First round
(Argentina) JP Guzmán (Argentina) L Olguín	7^{12}	6
WC	(France) M Rodrigues (France) Thomas Rodrigues	6^{10}	2
4	(Dominican Republic) J Hernández (Argentina) A Molteni	1	1
(Argentina) M Alund (Brazil) RD Silva	6	6
(Peru) D Beretta (Argentina) JI Londero	1	4
(Argentina) G Andreozzi (Argentina) A Collarini	6	6
(Argentina) F Coria (Spain) R Ortega Olmedo	6	5	[6]
(United States) Adham El-Effendi (United Kingdom) D Walsh	2	7	[10]
(France) O Charroin (France) Julien Obry	w/o
3	(Australia) J Kerr (France) F Martin
(Argentina) Guillermo Bujniewicz (Ecuador) Sebastián Rivera	3	6	[7]
(France) T Lamasine (France) L Lokoli	6	4	[10]
(France) D Guez (France) V Millot	w/o
2	(Philippines) R Gonzales (Venezuela) R Maytín

Quarterfinals
1	(Argentina) G Durán (Argentina) M González	6	6
(Argentina) JP Guzmán (Argentina) L Olguín	3	3
(Argentina) M Alund (Brazil) RD Silva	1	2
(Argentina) G Andreozzi (Argentina) A Collarini	6	6
(United States) A El-Effendi (United Kingdom) D Walsh	5	7^{7}	[10]
3	(Australia) J Kerr (France) F Martin	7	6^{2}	[5]
(France) T Lamasine (France) L Lokoli	6	7^{7}
2	(Philippines) R Gonzales (Venezuela) R Maytín	3	6^{5}

Semifinals
1	(Argentina) G Durán (Argentina) M González
(Argentina) G Andreozzi (Argentina) A Collarini	w/o
(United States) A El-Effendi (United Kingdom) D Walsh	5	6^{3}
(France) T Lamasine (France) L Lokoli	7	7^{7}

Final
1	(Argentina) G Durán (Argentina) M González	5	0
(France) T Lamasine (France) L Lokoli	7	6
