= 2023 Internationaux de Tennis de Blois – Doubles =

Doubles
- 2023 Internationaux de Tennis de Blois

Final
- Champions: (France) Dan Added (France) Grégoire Jacq
- Runners-up: (France) Théo Arribagé (France) Luca Sanchez
- Score: 6–4, 6–4

Events
Singles	Doubles
← 2022 ·	Internationaux de Tennis de Blois	· 2024 →

Sriram Balaji and Jeevan Nedunchezhiyan were the defending champions but chose not to defend their title.

Dan Added and Grégoire Jacq won the title after defeating Théo Arribagé and Luca Sanchez 6–4, 6–4 in the final.

== Seeds ==
1. (France) Théo Arribagé / (France) Luca Sanchez (final)
2. (France) Dan Added / (France) Grégoire Jacq (champions)
3. (Latvia) Miķelis Lībietis / (United States) Hunter Reese (first round)
4. (Sweden) Filip Bergevi / (Australia) Jason Taylor (quarterfinals)

== Draw ==
=== Key ===
- Q = Qualifier
- WC = Wild card
- LL = Lucky loser
- Alt = Alternate
- SE = Special exempt
- PR = Protected ranking
- ITF = ITF entry
- JE = Junior exempt
- w/o = Walkover
- r = Retired
- d = Defaulted
- SR = Special ranking

First round
1	(France) T Arribagé (France) L Sanchez	7	6
(Kazakhstan) G Lomakin (Ukraine) V Uzhylovskyi	5	3
(Romania) A Jecan (Sweden) DN Mădăraș	6	6
Alt	(Italy) Facundo Juárez (Mexico) R Pacheco Méndez	4	4
3	(Latvia) M Lībietis (United States) H Reese	6	3	[7]
(Bolivia) M Dellien (Switzerland) J Paul	0	6	[10]
(Peru) A Huertas del Pino (Peru) C Huertas del Pino	6	6
(France) M Bourgue (France) H Mayot	0	2
WC	(France) C Hemery (France) M Martineau	1	4
(Croatia) Z Babić (Netherlands) M Veldheer	6	6
(Germany) Elmar Ejupovic (Australia) A Taylor	5	7	[5]
4	(Sweden) F Bergevi (Australia) J Taylor	7	5	[10]
(India) RC Bollipalli (India) A Kadhe	4	2
PR	(Spain) Á López San Martín (Netherlands) M Vervoort	6	6
WC	(France) A Géa (France) Lilian Marmousez	2	7^{7}	[4]
2	(France) D Added (France) G Jacq	6	6^{2}	[10]

Quarterfinals
1	(France) T Arribagé (France) L Sanchez	4	7^{7}	[12]
(Romania) A Jecan (Sweden) DN Mădăraș	6	6^{5}	[10]
(Bolivia) M Dellien (Switzerland) J Paul	3	6^{9}
(Peru) A Huertas del Pino (Peru) C Huertas del Pino	6	7^{11}
(Croatia) Z Babić (Netherlands) M Veldheer	6	5	[10]
4	(Sweden) F Bergevi (Australia) J Taylor	3	7	[7]
PR	(Spain) Á López San Martín (Netherlands) M Vervoort	3	2
2	(France) D Added (France) G Jacq	6	6

Semifinals
1	(France) T Arribagé (France) L Sanchez	6	6
(Peru) A Huertas del Pino (Peru) C Huertas del Pino	3	4
(Croatia) Z Babić (Netherlands) M Veldheer	5	4
2	(France) D Added (France) G Jacq	7	6

Final
1	(France) T Arribagé (France) L Sanchez	4	4
2	(France) D Added (France) G Jacq	6	6
