= 2019 Internationaux de Tennis de Blois =

- Date: 17–23 June
- Edition: 7th
- Draw: 48S / 16D
- Surface: Clay
- Location: Blois, France

Champions

Singles
- (Portugal) Pedro Sousa

Doubles
- (France) Corentin Denolly / (France) Alexandre Müller
← 2018 ·	Internationaux de Tennis de Blois	· 2022 →

The 2019 Internationaux de Tennis de Blois was a professional tennis tournament played on clay courts. It was the seventh edition of the tournament which was part of the 2019 ATP Challenger Tour. It took place in Blois, France between 17 and 23 June 2019.

== Singles main-draw entrants ==
=== Seeds ===
Country	Player	Rank^{1}	Seed
POR	Pedro Sousa	124	1
ESP	Pedro Martínez	126	2
ITA	Lorenzo Giustino	144	3
BEL	Kimmer Coppejans	166	4
ARG	Carlos Berlocq	177	5
COL	Daniel Elahi Galán	186	6
~~FRA~~	~~Maxime Janvier~~	~~196~~	~~7~~
ARG	Federico Coria	201	8
ARG	Facundo Argüello	202	9
FRA	Constant Lestienne	206	10
~~FRA~~	~~Mathias Bourgue~~	~~234~~	~~11~~
ARG	Pedro Cachin	236	12
ESP	Bernabé Zapata Miralles	241	13
CAN	Steven Diez	243	14
JPN	Kaichi Uchida	245	15
FRA	Johan Tatlot	253	16
FRA	Tristan Lamasine	254	17

- ^{1} Rankings are as of 10 June 2019.

=== Other entrants ===
The following players received wildcards into the singles main draw:

- (France) Samuel Brosset
- (France) Maxime Hamou
- (France) Matteo Martineau
- (Denmark) Holger Rune
- (France) Enzo Wallart

The following players received entry into the singles main draw using their ITF World Tennis Ranking:

- (France) Corentin Denolly
- (France) Arthur Rinderknech
- (Germany) Peter Torebko
- (Netherlands) Botic van de Zandschulp
- (Netherlands) Tim van Rijthoven

The following player received entry into the singles main draw using a protected ranking:

- (Colombia) Nicolás Barrientos

The following players received entry into the singles main draw as alternates:

- (Brazil) Daniel Dutra da Silva
- (France) Jonathan Eysseric
- (Spain) Rubén Ramírez Hidalgo

The following players received entry from the qualifying draw:

- (Peru) Sergio Galdós
- (Netherlands) Mark Vervoort

The following player received entry as a lucky loser:

- (France) Youlian Iakovlev

== Champions ==
=== Singles ===
- (Portugal) Pedro Sousa def. (Belgium) Kimmer Coppejans 4–6, 6–3, 7–6^{(7–4)}.

=== Doubles ===
- (France) Corentin Denolly / (France) Alexandre Müller def. (Peru) Sergio Galdós / (Sweden) Andreas Siljeström 7–5, 6–7^{(5–7)}, [10–6].
