= 2019 Internationaux de Tennis de Blois – Doubles =

Doubles
- 2019 Internationaux de Tennis de Blois

Final
- Champions: (France) Corentin Denolly (France) Alexandre Müller
- Runners-up: (Peru) Sergio Galdós (Sweden) Andreas Siljeström
- Score: 7–5, 6–7^{(5–7)}, [10–6]

Events
Singles	Doubles
← 2018 ·	Internationaux de Tennis de Blois	· 2022 →

Fabrício Neis and David Vega Hernández were the defending champions but chose not to defend their title.

Corentin Denolly and Alexandre Müller won the title after defeating Sergio Galdós and Andreas Siljeström 7–5, 6–7^{(5–7)}, [10–6] in the final.

== Seeds ==
1. (Philippines) Ruben Gonzales / (India) Vishnu Vardhan (first round)
2. (France) Jonathan Eysseric / (France) Tristan Lamasine (quarterfinals)
3. (Argentina) Facundo Argüello / (Netherlands) Mark Vervoort (first round)
4. (Peru) Sergio Galdós / (Sweden) Andreas Siljeström (final)

== Draw ==
Key

- Q = Qualifier
- WC = Wild card
- LL = Lucky loser
- Alt = Alternate
- ITF = ITF entry
- PR = Protected ranking
- SR = Special ranking
- SE = Special exempt
- JE = Junior exempt
- JR = Junior Accelerator Programme entrant
- CO = College Accelerator Programme entrant
- NG = Next Gen Accelerator Program entrant
- w/o = Walkover
- r = Retired
- d = Defaulted

First round
1	(Philippines) R Gonzales (India) V Vardhan	3	4
(France) C Denolly (France) A Müller	6	6
WC	(France) M Guinard (France) A Rinderknech	6	7^{7}
Alt	(Brazil) D Dutra da Silva (Brazil) P Sakamoto	4	6^{4}
3	(Argentina) F Argüello (Netherlands) M Vervoort	3	4
PR	(Colombia) N Barrientos (Argentina) F Mena	6	6
WC	(France) Antoine Cornut-Chauvinc (France) M Martineau	7	7
WC	(France) J Tatlot (France) Enzo Wallart	5	5
(Dominican Republic) J Hernández-Fernández (Portugal) P Sousa	7^{7}	4	[6]
(Spain) P Martínez (Spain) B Zapata Miralles	6^{4}	6	[10]
PR	(Spain) R Ortega Olmedo (Spain) R Ramírez Hidalgo
4	(Peru) S Galdós (Sweden) A Siljeström	w/o
ITF	(Netherlands) J Sels (Netherlands) T van Rijthoven	6	6
(France) S Doumbia (Peru) JP Varillas	3	4
(Canada) S Diez (Argentina) R Olivo	4	0
2	(France) J Eysseric (France) T Lamasine	6	6

Quarterfinals
(France) C Denolly (France) A Müller	6	6
WC	(France) M Guinard (France) A Rinderknech	4	2
PR	(Colombia) N Barrientos (Argentina) F Mena	6	6
WC	(France) A Cornut-Chauvinc (France) M Martineau	3	3
(Spain) P Martínez (Spain) B Zapata Miralles	4	3
4	(Peru) S Galdós (Sweden) A Siljeström	6	6
ITF	(Netherlands) J Sels (Netherlands) T van Rijthoven	6	6
2	(France) J Eysseric (France) T Lamasine	1	2

Semifinals
(France) C Denolly (France) A Müller	6	3	[10]
PR	(Colombia) N Barrientos (Argentina) F Mena	3	6	[8]
4	(Peru) S Galdós (Sweden) A Siljeström	6	6
ITF	(Netherlands) J Sels (Netherlands) T van Rijthoven	4	3

Final
(France) C Denolly (France) A Müller	7	6^{5}	[10]
4	(Peru) S Galdós (Sweden) A Siljeström	5	7^{7}	[6]
