= 2014 Internationaux de Tennis de Blois – Singles =

Singles
- 2014 Internationaux de Tennis de Blois

Final
- Champion: (Argentina) Máximo González
- Runner-up: (Portugal) Gastão Elias
- Score: 6–2, 6–3

Events
Singles	Doubles
← 2013 ·	Internationaux de Tennis de Blois	· 2015 →

Julian Reister was the defending champion but chose not to compete.

Máximo González won the title, defeating Gastão Elias in the final, 6–2, 6–3.

== Seeds ==
1. (Argentina) Máximo González (champion)
2. (Argentina) Guido Andreozzi (first round, retired)
3. (France) Marc Gicquel (second round)
4. (France) David Guez (first round)
5. (France) Grégoire Burquier (first round)
6. (Portugal) Gastão Elias (final)
7. (Brazil) Rogério Dutra Silva (first round)
8. (Argentina) Martín Alund (first round)

== Draw ==
=== Key ===
- Q = Qualifier
- WC = Wild card
- LL = Lucky loser
- Alt = Alternate
- ITF = ITF entry
- PR = Protected ranking
- SR = Special ranking
- SE = Special exempt
- JE = Junior exempt
- JR = Junior Accelerator Programme entrant
- CO = College Accelerator Programme entrant
- NG = Next Gen Accelerator Program entrant
- w/o = Walkover
- r = Retired
- d = Defaulted

=== Finals ===
Semifinals
1	(Argentina) Máximo González	6	6
WC	(France) Gianni Mina	2	1
Q	(France) Mathieu Rodrigues	2	6^{8}
6	(Portugal) Gastão Elias	6	7^{10}

Final
1	(Argentina) Máximo González	6	6
6	(Portugal) Gastão Elias	2	3

=== Top half ===
First round
1	(Argentina) M González	6	7^{7}
(France) F Serra	2	6^{5}
(Argentina) A Collarini	6	3	7
(Argentina) JI Londero	4	6	5
(Belgium) N Desein	7	6
(France) M Teixeira	5	3
(France) J Eysseric	6	6^{6}	6
5	(France) G Burquier	1	7^{8}	4
4	(France) D Guez	3	1
Q	(France) G Sakharov	6	6
WC	(France) T Lamasine	4	4
Q	(Peru) D Beretta	6	6
(Belgium) Y Mertens	6	3	6
(Australia) J Thompson	4	6	2
WC	(France) G Mina	7^{7}	6^{0}	6
7	(Brazil) R Dutra Silva	6^{3}	7^{7}	3

Second round
1	(Argentina) M González	6	7^{7}
(Argentina) A Collarini	1	6^{4}
(Belgium) N Desein	6^{4}	6	4
(France) J Eysseric	7^{7}	4	6
Q	(France) G Sakharov	4	3
Q	(Peru) D Beretta	6	6
(Belgium) Y Mertens	4	3
WC	(France) G Mina	6	6

Quarterfinals
1	(Argentina) M González	6	6
(France) J Eysseric	2	1
Q	(Peru) D Beretta	7^{7}	3	3
WC	(France) G Mina	6^{0}	6	6

Semifinals
1	(Argentina) M González	6	6
WC	(France) G Mina	2	1

=== Bottom half ===
First round
8	(Argentina) M Alund	6^{4}	6	4
Q	(France) M Rodrigues	7^{7}	4	6
(Dominican Republic) J Hernández	6	6
WC	(France) F Martin	2	3
(Argentina) F Coria	3	6^{5}
(Spain) R Ortega-Olmedo	6	7^{7}
LL	(Ecuador) Sebastian Rivera	2	0
3	(France) M Gicquel	6	6
6	(Portugal) G Elias	3	6	6
(Argentina) A Molteni	6	3	4
(France) Julien Obry	6	2	1
(France) J Ouanna	1	6	6
Q	(France) E Couacaud	4	1
(France) V Millot	6	6
WC	(France) L Lokoli	7	2
2	(Argentina) G Andreozzi	5	1^{r}

Second round
Q	(France) M Rodrigues	4	6	7^{7}
(Dominican Republic) J Hernández	6	1	6^{4}
(Spain) R Ortega-Olmedo	3	6	6
3	(France) M Gicquel	6	3	4
6	(Portugal) G Elias	6	7
(France) J Ouanna	4	5
(France) V Millot	6	4	6
WC	(France) L Lokoli	4	6	1

Quarterfinals
Q	(France) M Rodrigues	4	6	7^{8}
(Spain) R Ortega-Olmedo	6	3	6^{6}
6	(Portugal) G Elias	4	6	7
(France) V Millot	6	2	5

Semifinals
Q	(France) M Rodrigues	2	6^{8}
6	(Portugal) G Elias	6	7^{10}
