= 2017 Internationaux de Tennis de Blois – Doubles =

Doubles
- 2017 Internationaux de Tennis de Blois

Final
- Champions: (Belgium) Sander Gillé (Belgium) Joran Vliegen
- Runners-up: (Argentina) Máximo González (Brazil) Fabrício Neis
- Score: 3–6, 6–3, [10–7]

Events
Singles	Doubles
← 2016 ·	Internationaux de Tennis de Blois	· 2018 →

Alexander Satschko and Simon Stadler were the defending champions but only Satschko chose to defend his title, partnering Gero Kretschmer. Satschko lost in the quarterfinals to Sander Gillé and Joran Vliegen.

Gillé and Vliegen won the title after defeating Máximo González and Fabrício Neis 3–6, 6–3, [10–7] in the final.

== Seeds ==
1. (Argentina) Máximo González / (Brazil) Fabrício Neis (final)
2. (Monaco) Romain Arneodo / (France) Hugo Nys (semifinals)
3. (Netherlands) Sander Arends / (Chinese Taipei) Peng Hsien-yin (semifinals)
4. (Germany) Gero Kretschmer / (Germany) Alexander Satschko (quarterfinals)

== Draw ==
=== Key ===
- Q = Qualifier
- WC = Wild card
- LL = Lucky loser
- Alt = Alternate
- SE = Special exempt
- PR = Protected ranking
- ITF = ITF entry
- JE = Junior exempt
- w/o = Walkover
- r = Retired
- d = Defaulted
- SR = Special ranking

First round
1	(Argentina) M González (Brazil) F Neis	6	7
(France) B Bonzi (France) G Jacq	4	5
(Brazil) P Bernardi (Brazil) T Monteiro	4	7^{7}	[10]
(Brazil) F de Paula (Netherlands) T Griekspoor	6	6^{5}	[5]
3	(Netherlands) S Arends (Chinese Taipei) H-y Peng	6	7^{7}
(Australia) Jarryd Chaplin (Philippines) R Gonzales	4	6^{4}
(India) R Ramanathan (Russia) A Vatutin	6	6
WC	(United Kingdom) Luke Purser (France) Thomas Rodrigues	0	2
(Belgium) S Gillé (Belgium) J Vliegen	6	6
WC	(Kazakhstan) A Nedovyesov (France) Alexandre Penaud	2	2
(Dominican Republic) J Hernández-Fernández (Brazil) J Souza	3	1
4	(Germany) G Kretschmer (Germany) A Satschko	6	6
(Norway) C Ruud (Netherlands) M Vervoort	6	3	[11]
WC	(France) C Lestienne (France) A Müller	3	6	[13]
(France) J Eysseric (Slovenia) B Rola	6^{4}	1
2	(Monaco) R Arneodo (France) H Nys	7^{7}	6

Quarterfinals
1	(Argentina) M González (Brazil) F Neis	7	7^{7}
(Brazil) P Bernardi (Brazil) T Monteiro	5	6^{2}
3	(Netherlands) S Arends (Chinese Taipei) H-y Peng	7^{7}	6
(India) R Ramanathan (Russia) A Vatutin	6^{4}	3
(Belgium) S Gillé (Belgium) J Vliegen	7	6
4	(Germany) G Kretschmer (Germany) A Satschko	5	2
WC	(France) C Lestienne (France) A Müller	1	1
2	(Monaco) R Arneodo (France) H Nys	6	6

Semifinals
1	(Argentina) M González (Brazil) F Neis	3	6	[10]
3	(Netherlands) S Arends (Chinese Taipei) H-y Peng	6	4	[7]
(Belgium) S Gillé (Belgium) J Vliegen	6	6
2	(Monaco) R Arneodo (France) H Nys	4	2

Final
1	(Argentina) M González (Brazil) F Neis	6	3	[7]
(Belgium) S Gillé (Belgium) J Vliegen	3	6	[10]
