= 2015 Internationaux de Tennis de Blois – Doubles =

Doubles
- 2015 Internationaux de Tennis de Blois

Final
- Champion: (France) Rémi Boutillier (France) Maxime Teixeira
- Runner-up: (Brazil) Guilherme Clezar (Argentina) Nicolás Kicker
- Score: 6–3, 4–6, [10–8]

Events
Singles	Doubles
- Internationaux de Tennis de Blois

Tristan Lamasine and Laurent Lokoli were the defending champions, but Lokoli decided not to participate this year. Lamasine played alongside Jonathan Eysseric, but they lost to James Cluskey and Alexandre Sidorenko in the first round.

Rémi Boutillier and Maxime Teixeira won the tournament, defeating Guilherme Clezar and Nicolás Kicker in the final, 6–3, 4–6, [10–8].

== Seeds ==
1. (Argentina) Guillermo Durán / (Argentina) Máximo González (first round, withdrew)
2. (Republic of Ireland) James Cluskey / (France) Alexandre Sidorenko (quarterfinals)
3. (Chile) Julio Peralta / (United States) Matt Seeberger (quarterfinals)
4. (Romania) Patrick Grigoriu / (Switzerland) Luca Margaroli (first round)

== Draw ==
Key

- Q = Qualifier
- WC = Wild card
- LL = Lucky loser
- Alt = Alternate
- ITF = ITF entry
- PR = Protected ranking
- SR = Special ranking
- SE = Special exempt
- JE = Junior exempt
- JR = Junior Accelerator Programme entrant
- CO = College Accelerator Programme entrant
- NG = Next Gen Accelerator Program entrant
- w/o = Walkover
- r = Retired
- d = Defaulted

=== Draw ===
First round
1	(Argentina) G Durán (Argentina) M González	w/o
(France) D Guez (France) A Musialek
WC	(Netherlands) Miliaan Niesten (France) G Sakharov	4	4
(Brazil) R Dutra Silva (Sweden) C Lindell	6	6
3	(Chile) J Peralta (United States) M Seeberger	6	3	[10]
(Belgium) A De Greef (France) G Mina	2	6	[6]
(Ecuador) G Escobar (Ecuador) G Lapentti	6^{3}	4
(France) R Boutillier (France) M Teixeira	7^{7}	6
PR	(Portugal) G Elias (Portugal) P Sousa	6^{5}	1
(Netherlands) S Arends (Netherlands) S Fransen	7^{7}	6
WC	(France) O Charroin (France) Laurent Rochette	6	6
4	(Romania) P Grigoriu (Switzerland) L Margaroli	4	3
(Brazil) G Clezar (Argentina) N Kicker	7	6
WC	(France) G Blancaneaux (France) Maxime Tabatruong	5	4
(France) J Eysseric (France) T Lamasine	4	2
2	(Republic of Ireland) J Cluskey (France) A Sidorenko	6	6

Quarterfinals
(France) D Guez (France) A Musialek	6	6
(Brazil) R Dutra Silva (Sweden) C Lindell	1	0
3	(Chile) J Peralta (United States) M Seeberger	3	4
(France) R Boutillier (France) M Teixeira	6	6
(Netherlands) S Arends (Netherlands) S Fransen	3	4
WC	(France) O Charroin (France) L Rochette	6	6
(Brazil) G Clezar (Argentina) N Kicker	6	6
2	(Republic of Ireland) J Cluskey (France) A Sidorenko	4	4

Semifinals
(France) D Guez (France) A Musialek	7	4	[11]
(France) R Boutillier (France) M Teixeira	5	6	[13]
WC	(France) O Charroin (France) L Rochette	5	2
(Brazil) G Clezar (Argentina) N Kicker	7	6

Final
(France) R Boutillier (France) M Teixeira	6	4	[10]
(Brazil) G Clezar (Argentina) N Kicker	3	6	[8]
