= 2023 Internationaux de Tennis de Blois =

- Date: 19–24 June
- Edition: 9th
- Surface: Clay
- Location: Blois, France

Champions

Singles
- (France) Quentin Halys

Doubles
- (France) Dan Added / (France) Grégoire Jacq
← 2022 ·	Internationaux de Tennis de Blois	· 2024 →

The 2023 Internationaux de Tennis de Blois was a professional tennis tournament played on clay courts. It was the ninth edition of the tournament which was part of the 2023 ATP Challenger Tour. It took place in Blois, France between 19 and 24 June 2023.

== Singles main-draw entrants ==
=== Seeds ===
Country	Player	Rank^{1}	Seed
FRA	Quentin Halys	84	1
ESP	Pedro Martínez	120	2
KAZ	Timofey Skatov	135	3
~~BRA~~	~~Felipe Meligeni Alves~~	~~156~~	~~4~~
BEL	Kimmer Coppejans	171	5
FRA	Harold Mayot	191	6
SWE	Dragoș Nicolae Mădăraș	207	7
	Evgeny Donskoy	230	8

- ^{1} Rankings are as of 12 June 2023.

=== Other entrants ===
The following players received wildcards into the singles main draw:

- (France) Mathias Bourgue
- (France) Arthur Géa
- (France) Clément Tabur

The following players received entry into the singles main draw as alternates:

- (Bolivia) Murkel Dellien
- (Romania) Filip Cristian Jianu

The following players received entry from the qualifying draw:

- (France) Ugo Blanchet
- (France) Kenny de Schepper
- (France) Kyrian Jacquet
- (United States) Alex Michelsen
- (Spain) Daniel Rincón
- (Spain) Nikolás Sánchez Izquierdo

The following player received entry as a lucky loser:

- (France) Calvin Hemery

== Champions ==
=== Singles ===
- (France) Quentin Halys def. (France) Kyrian Jacquet 4–6, 6–2, 2–0 ret.

=== Doubles ===
- (France) Dan Added / (France) Grégoire Jacq def. (France) Théo Arribagé / (France) Luca Sanchez 6–4, 6–4.
