= 2026 Internationaux de Tennis de Blois – Doubles =

Doubles
- 2026 Internationaux de Tennis de Blois

Final
- Champion: (Romania) Oana Gavrilă (Greece) Sapfo Sakellaridi
- Runner-up: (Ukraine) Anastasiia Firman (Italy) Isabella Maria Șerban
- Score: 6–4, 6–2

Events
Singles	Doubles
- Internationaux de Tennis de Blois

Cho I-hsuan and Cho Yi-tsen were the defending champions but chose to compete in Brescia instead.

Oana Gavrilă and Sapfo Sakellaridi won the title, defeating Anastasiia Firman and Isabella Maria Șerban 6–4, 6–2 in the final.

== Seeds ==
1. (Romania) Oana Gavrilă / (Greece) Sapfo Sakellaridi (champion)
2. (France) Yara Bartashevich / Sofya Lansere (first round)
3. (Belgium) Polina Bakhmutkina / (Germany) Mina Hodzic (quarterfinals)
4. (Netherlands) Jasmijn Gimbrère / (Argentina) Julia Riera (quarterfinals, withdrew)

== Draw ==
Key

- Q = Qualifier
- WC = Wild card
- LL = Lucky loser
- Alt = Alternate
- ITF = ITF entry
- PR = Protected ranking
- SR = Special ranking
- SE = Special exempt
- JE = Junior exempt
- JR = Junior Accelerator Programme entrant
- CO = College Accelerator Programme entrant
- NG = Next Gen Accelerator Program entrant
- w/o = Walkover
- r = Retired
- d = Defaulted

First round
(Switzerland) A Granwehr; A Ibragimova	4	6	[8]
(Germany) T Morderger (Germany) Y Morderger	6	2	[10]
4	(Netherlands) J Gimbrère (Argentina) J Riera	6	7
WC	(France) C Cirotte (France) P Dore	2	5
WC	(France) L Boulard; A Mozgaleva	6	6
WC	(France) M Kolvinter (France) H Mastorakis	2	3
(Ukraine) A Firman (Italy) IM Șerban	6	4	[10]
WC	(France) S Hamon (France) L Lutringer	4	6	[4]
(Slovakia) M Okáľová (Belgium) J Otzipka	2	0
3	(Belgium) P Bakhmutkina (Germany) M Hodzic	6	6
(France) A Lew Yan Foon (France) L Nguyen Tan	6	6
(France) S Cakarevic (Denmark) O Gram	1	2
(France) A Cirotte (France) D Martynov	6	4	[10]
2	(France) Y Bartashevich; S Lansere	4	6	[2]

Quarterfinals
1	(Romania) O Gavrilă (Greece) S Sakellaridi	6	6
(Germany) T Morderger (Germany) Y Morderger	3	3
4	(Netherlands) J Gimbrère (Argentina) J Riera
WC	(France) L Boulard; A Mozgaleva	w/o
(Ukraine) A Firman (Italy) IM Șerban	6	4	[12]
3	(Belgium) P Bakhmutkina (Germany) M Hodzic	4	6	[10]
(France) A Lew Yan Foon (France) L Nguyen Tan	4	2
(France) A Cirotte (France) D Martynov	6	6

Semifinals
1	(Romania) O Gavrilă (Greece) S Sakellaridi	6	6
WC	(France) L Boulard; A Mozgaleva	3	1
(Ukraine) A Firman (Italy) IM Șerban	6	6^{5}	[10]
(France) A Cirotte (France) D Martynov	3	7^{7}	[6]

Final
1	(Romania) O Gavrilă (Greece) S Sakellaridi	6	6
(Ukraine) A Firman (Italy) IM Șerban	4	2
