= 2014 Internationaux de Tennis de Blois =

- Date: 9–15 June
- Edition: 2nd
- Draw: 32S / 16D
- Prize money: €30,000+H
- Surface: Clay
- Location: Blois, France

Champions

Singles
- (Argentina) Máximo González

Doubles
- (France) Tristan Lamasine / (France) Laurent Lokoli
← 2013 ·	Internationaux de Tennis de Blois	· 2015 →

The 2014 Internationaux de Tennis de Blois was a professional tennis tournament played on clay courts. It was the second edition of the tournament which was part of the 2014 ATP Challenger Tour. It took place in Blois, France between 9 and 15 June 2014.

== Singles main-draw entrants ==
=== Seeds ===
Country	Player	Rank^{1}	Seed
ARG	Máximo González	133	1
ARG	Guido Andreozzi	148	2
FRA	Marc Gicquel	154	3
FRA	David Guez	170	4
FRA	Grégoire Burquier	175	5
POR	Gastão Elias	178	6
BRA	Rogério Dutra Silva	179	7
ARG	Martín Alund	194	8

- ^{1} Rankings are as of May 26, 2014.

=== Other entrants ===
The following players received wildcards into the singles main draw:

- (France) Tristan Lamasine
- (France) Laurent Lokoli
- (France) Fabrice Martin
- (France) Gianni Mina

The following players received entry from the qualifying draw:

- (France) Gleb Sakharov
- (Peru) Duilio Beretta
- (France) Mathieu Rodrigues
- (France) Enzo Couacaud

== Doubles main-draw entrants ==
=== Seeds ===
Country	Player	Country	Player	Rank^{1}	Seed
ARG	Guillermo Durán	ARG	Máximo González	207	1
PHI	Ruben Gonzales	VEN	Roberto Maytín	356	2
AUS	Jordan Kerr	FRA	Fabrice Martin	369	3
DOM	José Hernández	ARG	Andrés Molteni	484	4

- ^{1} Rankings as of May 26, 2014.

=== Other entrants ===
The following pair received wildcards into the doubles main draw:

- (France) Mathieu Rodrigues / (France) Thomas Rodrigues

== Champions ==
=== Singles ===
- (Argentina) Máximo González def. (Portugal) Gastão Elias, 6–2, 6–3

=== Doubles ===
- (France) Tristan Lamasine / (France) Laurent Lokoli def. (Argentina) Guillermo Durán / (Argentina) Máximo González, 7–5, 6–0
