= Griekspoor =

Griekspoor is a surname. Notable people with the surname include:

- Scott Griekspoor (born 1991), Dutch tennis player
- Tallon Griekspoor (born 1996), Dutch tennis player
