= 2022 Internationaux de Tennis de Blois – Doubles =

Doubles
- 2022 Internationaux de Tennis de Blois

Final
- Champions: (India) Sriram Balaji (India) Jeevan Nedunchezhiyan
- Runners-up: (Monaco) Romain Arneodo (France) Jonathan Eysseric
- Score: 6–4, 6–7^{(3–7)}, [10–7]

Events
| Singles | Doubles |
| ← 2019 · | Internationaux de Tennis de Blois | · 2023 → |

Corentin Denolly and Alexandre Müller were the defending champions but chose not to defend their title.

Sriram Balaji and Jeevan Nedunchezhiyan won the title after defeating Romain Arneodo and Jonathan Eysseric 6–4, 6–7^{(3–7)}, [10–7] in the final.

== Seeds ==
1. (Austria) Alexander Erler / (France) Albano Olivetti (first round)
2. (Monaco) Romain Arneodo / (France) Jonathan Eysseric (final)
3. (Venezuela) Luis David Martínez / (India) Saketh Myneni (quarterfinals)
4. (Philippines) Ruben Gonzales / (India) Arjun Kadhe (first round)

== Draw ==
=== Key ===
- Q = Qualifier
- WC = Wild card
- LL = Lucky loser
- Alt = Alternate
- SE = Special exempt
- PR = Protected ranking
- ITF = ITF entry
- JE = Junior exempt
- w/o = Walkover
- r = Retired
- d = Defaulted
- SR = Special ranking

First round
1 | (Austria) A Erler (France) A Olivetti | 6^{5} | 7^{7} | [5]
(Kazakhstan) G Lomakin (Ukraine) V Manafov | 7^{7} | 6^{4} | [10]
(Germany) H Jebens (Poland) P Matuszewski | 3 | 4
(India) S Balaji (India) J Nedunchezhiyan | 6 | 6
4 | (Philippines) R Gonzales (India) A Kadhe | 4 | 6^{0}
(Bolivia) B Arias (Bolivia) F Zeballos | 6 | 7^{7}
WC | (France) Jordan Ubiergo (France) Enzo Wallart | 6 | 6
(Peru) S Galdós (Argentina) C Ugo Carabelli | 4 | 4
(France) T Arribagé (France) E Couacaud | 6 | 1 | [3]
WC | (France) A Fils (France) L Van Assche | 3 | 6 | [10]
(Argentina) A Collarini (Argentina) F Díaz Acosta | 1 | 3
3 | (Venezuela) LD Martínez (India) S Myneni | 6 | 6
Alt | (Canada) A Galarneau (United States) A Rybakov | 6 | 6
(Peru) A Merino (Argentina) JB Torres | 4 | 2
(Uzbekistan) S Fayziev (Greece) M Kalovelonis | 6^{4} | 6 | [8]
2 | (Monaco) R Arneodo (France) J Eysseric | 7^{7} | 4 | [10]

Quarterfinals
(Kazakhstan) G Lomakin (Ukraine) V Manafov | 7^{7} | 4 | [5]
(India) S Balaji (India) J Nedunchezhiyan | 6^{3} | 6 | [10]
(Bolivia) B Arias (Bolivia) F Zeballos | 4 | 6 | [10]
WC | (France) J Ubiergo (France) E Wallart | 6 | 4 | [8]
WC | (France) A Fils (France) L Van Assche | 6 | 6
3 | (Venezuela) LD Martínez (India) S Myneni | 1 | 4
Alt | (Canada) A Galarneau (United States) A Rybakov | 1 | 4
2 | (Monaco) R Arneodo (France) J Eysseric | 6 | 6

Semifinals
(India) S Balaji (India) J Nedunchezhiyan | 6 | 6
(Bolivia) B Arias (Bolivia) F Zeballos | 0 | 3
WC | (France) A Fils (France) L Van Assche | 1 | 4
2 | (Monaco) R Arneodo (France) J Eysseric | 6 | 6

Final
(India) S Balaji (India) J Nedunchezhiyan | 6 | 6^{3} | [10]
2 | (Monaco) R Arneodo (France) J Eysseric | 4 | 7^{7} | [7]
