= 2018 Internationaux de Tennis de Blois =

- Date: 18–24 June
- Edition: 6th
- Draw: 32S / 16D
- Surface: Clay
- Location: Blois, France

Champions

Singles
- (Netherlands) Scott Griekspoor

Doubles
- (Brazil) Fabrício Neis / (Spain) David Vega Hernández
← 2017 ·	Internationaux de Tennis de Blois	· 2019 →

The 2018 Internationaux de Tennis de Blois was a professional tennis tournament played on clay courts. It was the sixth edition of the tournament which was part of the 2018 ATP Challenger Tour. It took place in Blois, France between 18 and 24 June 2018.

== Singles main-draw entrants ==
=== Seeds ===
Country	Player	Rank^{1}	Seed
POR	Pedro Sousa	127	1
~~FRA~~	~~Calvin Hemery~~	~~131~~	~~2~~
SUI	Henri Laaksonen	138	3
ARG	Juan Ignacio Londero	163	4
CAN	Félix Auger-Aliassime	170	5
ARG	Carlos Berlocq	171	6
FRA	Stéphane Robert	174	7
CHI	Christian Garín	179	8

- ^{1} Rankings are as of 11 June 2018.

=== Other entrants ===
The following players received wildcards into the singles main draw:

- (France) Jaimee Floyd Angele
- ~~(France) Calvin Hemery~~
- (France) Alexandre Müller
- (France) Stéphane Robert

The following players received entry into the singles main draw as special exempts:

- (Italy) Roberto Marcora
- (France) Johan Tatlot

The following players received entry from the qualifying draw:

- (Chile) Marcelo Tomás Barrios Vera
- (France) Tristan Lamasine
- (France) Jules Okala
- (Sweden) Mikael Ymer

The following player received entry as a lucky loser:

- (Finland) Harri Heliövaara

== Champions ==
=== Singles ===
- (Netherlands) Scott Griekspoor def. (Canada) Félix Auger-Aliassime 6–4, 6–4.

=== Doubles ===
- (Brazil) Fabrício Neis / (Spain) David Vega Hernández def. (Chinese Taipei) Hsieh Cheng-peng / (Australia) Rameez Junaid 7–6^{(7–4)}, 6–1.
