= 2017 Internationaux de Tennis de Blois – Singles =

Singles
- 2017 Internationaux de Tennis de Blois

Final
- Champion: (Bosnia and Herzegovina) Damir Džumhur
- Runner-up: (France) Calvin Hemery
- Score: 6–1, 6–3

Events
Singles	Doubles
← 2016 ·	Internationaux de Tennis de Blois	· 2018 →

Carlos Berlocq was the defending champion but chose not to defend his title.

Damir Džumhur won the title after defeating Calvin Hemery 6–1, 6–3 in the final.

== Seeds ==
1. (Bosnia and Herzegovina) Damir Džumhur (champion)
2. (Japan) Taro Daniel (withdrew)
3. (Brazil) Thiago Monteiro (second round)
4. (Switzerland) Henri Laaksonen (semifinals)
5. (Norway) Casper Ruud (quarterfinals)
6. (France) Stéphane Robert (second round)
7. (Czech Republic) Jan Šátral (first round)
8. (Brazil) João Souza (first round, retired)

== Draw ==
=== Key ===
- Q = Qualifier
- WC = Wild card
- LL = Lucky loser
- Alt = Alternate
- SE = Special exempt
- PR = Protected ranking
- ITF = ITF entry
- JE = Junior exempt
- w/o = Walkover
- r = Retired
- d = Defaulted
- SR = Special ranking

=== Finals ===
Semifinals
1	(Bosnia and Herzegovina) Damir Džumhur	7^{12}	6
4	(Switzerland) Henri Laaksonen	6^{10}	1
(France) Calvin Hemery	6	7^{7}
(France) Mathias Bourgue	1	6^{5}

Final
1	(Bosnia and Herzegovina) Damir Džumhur	6	6
(France) Calvin Hemery	1	3

=== Top half ===
First round
1	(Bosnia and Herzegovina) D Džumhur	6	2
Q	(Estonia) J Zopp	4	1^{r}
WC	(France) G Mina	2	0^{r}
SE	(Canada) F Auger-Aliassime	6	4
WC	(France) A Müller	1	6	6
Q	(France) C Moutet	6	4	2
(Russia) A Vatutin	6	3	4
6	(France) S Robert	3	6	6
4	(Switzerland) H Laaksonen	6	7^{7}
(Germany) D Brands	1	6^{4}
(France) C Lestienne	5
(Kazakhstan) A Nedovyesov	0^{r}
WC	(France) B Bonzi	7	4	7^{7}
Q	(Netherlands) T Griekspoor	5	6	6^{1}
(Slovenia) B Rola	6	6
7	(Czech Republic) J Šátral	4	1

Second round
1	(Bosnia and Herzegovina) D Džumhur	6^{4}	6	6
SE	(Canada) F Auger-Aliassime	7^{7}	3	4
WC	(France) A Müller	6	6
6	(France) S Robert	2	4
4	(Switzerland) H Laaksonen	6	6
(France) C Lestienne	4	4
WC	(France) B Bonzi	3	3
(Slovenia) B Rola	6	6

Quarterfinals
1	(Bosnia and Herzegovina) D Džumhur	6	6^{5}	6
WC	(France) A Müller	2	7^{7}	4
4	(Switzerland) H Laaksonen	6^{0}	6	6
(Slovenia) B Rola	7^{7}	3	4

Semifinals
1	(Bosnia and Herzegovina) D Džumhur	7^{12}	6
4	(Switzerland) H Laaksonen	6^{10}	1

=== Bottom half ===
First round
5	(Norway) C Ruud	7	6
(Belgium) K Coppejans	5	3
(France) T Lamasine	6	4	4
WC	(France) J Eysseric	3	6	6
(France) C Hemery	7	6
(Argentina) M González	5	0
(Argentina) G Andreozzi	5	3
3	(Brazil) T Monteiro	7	6
8	(Brazil) J Souza	4	0^{r}
LL	(France) G Jacq	6	0
(France) M Bourgue	6	6
(India) R Ramanathan	4	2
(Spain) Í Cervantes	5	0^{r}
(Dominican Republic) J Hernández-Fernández	7	4
(Portugal) P Sousa	6	6
Q	(Australia) M Banes	3	3

Second round
5	(Norway) C Ruud	3	6	6
WC	(France) J Eysseric	6	1	4
(France) C Hemery	7^{7}	7^{7}
3	(Brazil) T Monteiro	6^{2}	6^{3}
LL	(France) G Jacq	2	5
(France) M Bourgue	6	7
(Dominican Republic) J Hernández-Fernández	5	1
(Portugal) P Sousa	7	6

Quarterfinals
5	(Norway) C Ruud	3	5
(France) C Hemery	6	7
(France) M Bourgue	5	6	6
(Portugal) P Sousa	7	3	3

Semifinals
(France) C Hemery	6	7^{7}
(France) M Bourgue	1	6^{5}
