= 2026 Internationaux de Tennis de Blois – Singles =

Singles
- 2026 Internationaux de Tennis de Blois

Final
- Champion: (Malta) Francesca Curmi
- Runner-up: Alevtina Ibragimova
- Score: 6–3, 7–5

Events
Singles	Doubles
- Internationaux de Tennis de Blois

Panna Udvardy was the defending champion, but chose to compete in Nottingham qualifying instead.

Francesca Curmi won the title, defeating Alevtina Ibragimova 6–3, 7–5 in the final.

== Seeds ==
1. (Serbia) Lola Radivojević (second round)
2. (Greece) Despina Papamichail (quarterfinals)
3. (Argentina) Julia Riera (quarterfinals)
4. (Argentina) María Lourdes Carlé (first round)
5. Sofya Lansere (second round)
6. (Italy) Jessica Pieri (withdrew)
7. Alevtina Ibragimova (final)
8. (Netherlands) Anouck Vrancken Peeters (first round)

== Draw ==
Key

- Q = Qualifier
- WC = Wild card
- LL = Lucky loser
- Alt = Alternate
- ITF = ITF entry
- PR = Protected ranking
- SR = Special ranking
- SE = Special exempt
- JE = Junior exempt
- JR = Junior Accelerator Programme entrant
- CO = College Accelerator Programme entrant
- NG = Next Gen Accelerator Program entrant
- w/o = Walkover
- r = Retired
- d = Defaulted

=== Finals ===
Semifinals
(Malta) Francesca Curmi	2	7	6
Q	(Turkey) İpek Öz	6	5	4
7	Alevtina Ibragimova	7	6
WC	(France) Lucie Nguyen Tan	5	2

Final
(Malta) Francesca Curmi	6	7
7	Alevtina Ibragimova	3	5

=== Top half ===
First round
1	(Serbia) L Radivojević	6	6
Q	(Italy) IM Șerban	3	2
(France) A Lew Yan Foon	3	1
(Malta) F Curmi	6	6
SE	(France) J Lim	6	6
Q	(France) L Boulard	3	2
Q	(France) Y Bartashevich	6	1	6^{3}
5	S Lansere	4	6	7^{7}
3	(Argentina) J Riera	4	7^{7}	6
WC	(France) M Lollia	6	6^{4}	2
Q	(France) P Dore	6	1	7^{8}
(Greece) S Sakellaridi	2	6	6^{6}
(France) D Martynov	6	6
LL	(France) K Chiarello	3	3
Q	(Turkey) İ Öz	6	6
LL	(France) H Bougouffa	2	0

Second round
1	(Serbia) L Radivojević	5	3
(Malta) F Curmi	7	6
SE	(France) J Lim	6	1	6
5	S Lansere	4	6	4
3	(Argentina) J Riera	6	6
Q	(France) P Dore	1	1
(France) D Martynov	4	3
Q	(Turkey) İ Öz	6	6

Quarterfinals
(Malta) F Curmi	6	6
SE	(France) J Lim	1	0
3	(Argentina) J Riera	6	1	1
Q	(Turkey) İ Öz	2	6	6

Semifinals
(Malta) F Curmi	2	7	6
Q	(Turkey) İ Öz	6	5	4

=== Bottom half ===
First round
7	A Ibragimova	4	6	6
(France) M Rouvroy	6	3	3
WC	(France) S Iliev	5	2
(Germany) M Hodzic	7	6
(France) A Hesse	6	6
(Netherlands) J Gimbrère	0	3
Q	(Ukraine) A Firman	6	6
4	(Argentina) ML Carlé	3	2
8	(Netherlands) A Vrancken Peeters	4	6	5
WC	(France) L Nguyen Tan	6	3	7
Q	(France) S Cakarevic	7	2	2
(Switzerland) A Granwehr	5	6	6
Q	(Belgium) J Otzipka	7^{8}	5	2
SE	(France) C Burel	6^{6}	7	6
WC	(France) A Cirotte	3	6	6^{5}
2	(Greece) D Papamichail	6	4	7^{7}

Second round
7	A Ibragimova	6	6
(Germany) M Hodzic	3	2
(France) A Hesse	6	6
Q	(Ukraine) A Firman	1	3
WC	(France) L Nguyen Tan	6	6
(Switzerland) A Granwehr	3	0
SE	(France) C Burel	3	0^{r}
2	(Greece) D Papamichail	6	0

Quarterfinals
7	A Ibragimova	6	6
(France) A Hesse	2	0
WC	(France) L Nguyen Tan	7^{8}	7
2	(Greece) D Papamichail	6^{6}	5

Semifinals
7	A Ibragimova	7	6
WC	(France) L Nguyen Tan	5	2
