= 2024 Internationaux de Tennis de Blois – Doubles =

Doubles
- 2024 Internationaux de Tennis de Blois

Final
- Champions: (Zimbabwe) Benjamin Lock (Zimbabwe) Courtney John Lock
- Runners-up: (France) Corentin Denolly (France) Arthur Géa
- Score: 1–6, 6–3, [10–4]

Events
Singles	Doubles
- Internationaux de Tennis de Blois

Dan Added and Grégoire Jacq were the defending champions but chose not to defend their title.

Benjamin and Courtney John Lock won the title after defeating Corentin Denolly and Arthur Géa 1–6, 6–3, [10–4] in the final.

== Seeds ==
1. (Australia) Thomas Fancutt / (New Zealand) Rubin Statham (quarterfinals)
2. (Canada) Kelsey Stevenson / (Australia) Adam Taylor (first round)
3. (India) Siddhant Banthia / (India) Divij Sharan (quarterfinals)
4. (Switzerland) Rémy Bertola / (Belgium) Michael Geerts (quarterfinals, withdrew)

== Draw ==
Key

- Q = Qualifier
- WC = Wild card
- LL = Lucky loser
- Alt = Alternate
- ITF = ITF entry
- PR = Protected ranking
- SR = Special ranking
- SE = Special exempt
- JE = Junior exempt
- JR = Junior Accelerator Programme entrant
- CO = College Accelerator Programme entrant
- NG = Next Gen Accelerator Program entrant
- w/o = Walkover
- r = Retired
- d = Defaulted

=== Draw ===
First round
1	(Australia) T Fancutt (New Zealand) R Statham	6	6
(Croatia) Z Babić (Brazil) Gabriel Roveri Sidney	4	1
(Czech Republic) Jiří Barnat (Czech Republic) F Duda	4	6	[10]
(Tunisia) M Echargui (Italy) Federico Iannaccone	6	3	[7]
4	(Switzerland) R Bertola (Belgium) M Geerts	6	6
(Peru) A Merino (Germany) C Negritu	4	4
Alt	(Uzbekistan) D Istomin; A Kachmazov
(France) C Denolly (France) A Géa	w/o
(Zimbabwe) B Lock (Zimbabwe) CJ Lock	6	6
(Bulgaria) A Genov (Spain) B Pujol Navarro	3	4
(United Kingdom) James Davis (United Kingdom) J MacKinlay	4	2
3	(India) S Banthia (India) D Sharan	6	6
(Australia) B Bayldon (Netherlands) M Hermans	3	2
WC	(France) G Debru (France) Paul Inchauspé	6	6
(Italy) Luca Potenza (United States) Tennyson Whiting	6	6
2	(Canada) K Stevenson (Australia) A Taylor	1	4

Quarterfinals
1	(Australia) T Fancutt (New Zealand) R Statham	6^{7}	4
(Czech Republic) J Barnat (Czech Republic) F Duda	7^{9}	6
4	(Switzerland) R Bertola (Belgium) M Geerts
(France) C Denolly (France) A Géa	w/o
(Zimbabwe) B Lock (Zimbabwe) CJ Lock	7^{7}	6
3	(India) S Banthia (India) D Sharan	6^{4}	4
WC	(France) G Debru (France) P Inchauspé	3	4
(Italy) L Potenza (United States) T Whiting	6	6

Semifinals
(Czech Republic) J Barnat (Czech Republic) F Duda	3	4
(France) C Denolly (France) A Géa	6	6
(Zimbabwe) B Lock (Zimbabwe) CJ Lock	6	6^{6}	[11]
(Italy) L Potenza (United States) T Whiting	4	7^{8}	[9]

Final
(France) C Denolly (France) A Géa	6	3	[4]
(Zimbabwe) B Lock (Zimbabwe) CJ Lock	1	6	[10]
