= 2017 Internationaux de Tennis de Blois =

- Date: 19–25 June
- Edition: 5th
- Draw: 32S / 16D
- Surface: Clay
- Location: Blois, France

Champions

Singles
- (Bosnia and Herzegovina) Damir Džumhur

Doubles
- (Belgium) Sander Gillé / (Belgium) Joran Vliegen
← 2016 ·	Internationaux de Tennis de Blois	· 2018 →

The 2017 Internationaux de Tennis de Blois was a professional tennis tournament played on clay courts. It was the fifth edition of the tournament which was part of the 2017 ATP Challenger Tour. It took place in Blois, France between 19 and 25 June 2017.

== Singles main-draw entrants ==
=== Seeds ===
Country	Player	Rank^{1}	Seed
BIH	Damir Džumhur	92	1
~~JPN~~	~~Taro Daniel~~	~~93~~	~~2~~
BRA	Thiago Monteiro	96	3
SUI	Henri Laaksonen	102	4
NOR	Casper Ruud	112	5
FRA	Stéphane Robert	139	6
CZE	Jan Šátral	144	7
BRA	João Souza	147	8

- ^{1} Rankings are as of 12 June 2017.

=== Other entrants ===
The following players received wildcards into the singles main draw:

- (France) Benjamin Bonzi
- (France) Jonathan Eysseric
- (France) Gianni Mina
- (France) Alexandre Müller

The following player received entry into the singles main draw as a special exempt:

- (Canada) Félix Auger-Aliassime

The following players received entry from the qualifying draw:

- (Australia) Maverick Banes
- (Netherlands) Tallon Griekspoor
- (France) Corentin Moutet
- (Estonia) Jürgen Zopp

The following player received entry as a lucky loser:

- (France) Grégoire Jacq

== Champions ==
=== Singles ===
- (Bosnia and Herzegovina) Damir Džumhur def. (France) Calvin Hemery 6–1, 6–3.

=== Doubles ===
- (Belgium) Sander Gillé / (Belgium) Joran Vliegen def. (Argentina) Máximo González / (Brazil) Fabrício Neis 3–6, 6–3, [10–7].
