= 2026 Internationaux de Tennis de Blois =

Tennis tournament

- Date: 15–21 June 2026
- Edition: 2nd
- Category: ITF Women's World Tennis Tour
- Draw: 32S / 16D
- Prize money: $60,000
- Surface: Clay / Outdoor
- Location: Blois, France
- Venue: Ligue Centre Val de Loire de Tennis

Champions

Singles
- (Malta) Francesca Curmi

Doubles
- (Romania) Oana Gavrilă / (Greece) Sapfo Sakellaridi
- Internationaux de Tennis de Blois

The 2026 Internationaux de Tennis de Blois is a professional tennis tournament play on outdoor clay courts. It is the second edition of the tournament, which was part of the 2026 ITF Women's World Tennis Tour. It takes place in Blois, France, between 15 and 21 June 2026.

== Champions ==
=== Singles ===
- (Malta) Francesca Curmi def. Alevtina Ibragimova, 6–3, 7–5.

=== Doubles ===
- (Greece) Sapfo Sakellaridi / (Romania) Oana Gavrilă def. (Italy) Isabella Maria Șerban / (Ukraine) Anastasiia Firman 6–4, 6–2.

== Singles main draw entrants ==
=== Seeds ===
Country	Player	Rank	Seed
SRB	Lola Radivojević	152	1
GRE	Despina Papamichail	168	2
ARG	Julia Riera	181	3
ARG	María Lourdes Carlé	214	4
	Sofya Lansere	262	5
~~ITA~~	~~Jessica Pieri~~	~~264~~	~~6~~
	Alevtina Ibragimova	318	7
NED	Anouck Vrancken Peeters	320	8

- Rankings are as of 8 June 2026.

=== Other entrants ===
The following players received wildcards into the singles main draw:

- (France) Astrid Cirotte
- (France) Sarah Iliev
- (France) Mathilde Lollia
- (France) Lucie Nguyen Tan

The following players received entry as special exempts:

- (France) Clara Burel
- (France) Jenny Lim

The following players received entry from the qualifying draw:

- (France) Yara Bartashevich
- (France) Liv Boulard
- (France) Sara Cakarevic
- (France) Pauline Dore
- (Ukraine) Anastasiia Firman
- (Belgium) Jana Otzipka
- (Turkey) İpek Öz
- (Italy) Isabella Maria Șerban

The following players received entry as lucky losers:

- (France) Hanna Bougouffa
- (France) Kim Chiarello
