= 2022 Internationaux de Tennis de Blois =

- Date: 13–19 June
- Edition: 8th
- Surface: Clay
- Location: Blois, France

Champions

Singles
- (France) Alexandre Müller

Doubles
- (India) Sriram Balaji / (India) Jeevan Nedunchezhiyan
← 2019 ·	Internationaux de Tennis de Blois	· 2023 →

The 2022 Internationaux de Tennis de Blois was a professional tennis tournament played on clay courts. It was the eighth edition of the tournament which was part of the 2022 ATP Challenger Tour. It took place in Blois, France between 13 and 19 June 2022.

== Singles main-draw entrants ==
=== Seeds ===
Country	Player	Rank^{1}	Seed
CZE	Zdeněk Kolář	117	1
FRA	Corentin Moutet	128	2
ARG	Camilo Ugo Carabelli	137	3
ARG	Pedro Cachin	142	4
CZE	Vít Kopřiva	146	5
AUT	Dennis Novak	154	6
SRB	Nikola Milojević	164	7
CRO	Nino Serdarušić	183	8

- ^{1} Rankings are as of 6 June 2022.

=== Other entrants ===
The following players received wildcards into the singles main draw:

- (France) Térence Atmane
- (France) Arthur Fils
- (France) Corentin Moutet

The following players received entry into the singles main draw as alternates:

- (Chile) Gonzalo Lama
- (Argentina) Genaro Alberto Olivieri

The following players received entry from the qualifying draw:

- (Brazil) Gabriel Décamps
- Evgeny Karlovskiy
- (Japan) Shintaro Mochizuki
- (United States) Alex Rybakov
- (Spain) Nikolás Sánchez Izquierdo
- (France) Luca Van Assche

== Champions ==
=== Singles ===
- (France) Alexandre Müller def. (Serbia) Nikola Milojević 7–6^{(7–3)}, 6–1.

=== Doubles ===
- (India) Sriram Balaji / (India) Jeevan Nedunchezhiyan def. (Monaco) Romain Arneodo / (France) Jonathan Eysseric 6–4, 6–7^{(3–7)}, [10–7].
