= 2024 Internationaux de Tennis de Blois – Singles =

Singles
- 2024 Internationaux de Tennis de Blois

Final
- Champion: (Lithuania) Ričardas Berankis
- Runner-up: (France) Calvin Hemery
- Score: 7–6^{(7–4)}, 7–5

Events
Singles	Doubles
- Internationaux de Tennis de Blois

Quentin Halys was the defending champion but chose not to defend his title.

Ričardas Berankis won the title after defeating Calvin Hemery 7–6^{(7–4)}, 7–5 in the final.

== Seeds ==
1. (France) Calvin Hemery (final)
2. (France) Clément Tabur (first round)
3. (France) Jules Marie (semifinals)
4. (Turkey) Ergi Kırkın (quarterfinals)
5. Alibek Kachmazov (semifinals)
6. (Lithuania) Vilius Gaubas (first round)
7. (France) Tristan Lamasine (first round)
8. (Denmark) Elmer Møller (first round)

== Draw ==
Key

- Q = Qualifier
- WC = Wild card
- LL = Lucky loser
- Alt = Alternate
- ITF = ITF entry
- PR = Protected ranking
- SR = Special ranking
- SE = Special exempt
- JE = Junior exempt
- JR = Junior Accelerator Programme entrant
- CO = College Accelerator Programme entrant
- NG = Next Gen Accelerator Program entrant
- w/o = Walkover
- r = Retired
- d = Defaulted

=== Finals ===
Semifinals
1	(France) Calvin Hemery	6	6
5	Alibek Kachmazov	3	4
3/WC	(France) Jules Marie	0	4
(Lithuania) Ričardas Berankis	6	6

Final
1	(France) Calvin Hemery	6^{4}	5
(Lithuania) Ričardas Berankis	7^{7}	7

=== Top half ===
First round
1	(France) C Hemery	6	6
Q	(Italy) J Berrettini	3	3
(Tunisia) M Echargui	6	6
(Ukraine) Vadym Ursu	3	1
Q	E Karlovskiy	2	4
Alt	(France) C Denolly	6	6
(Belgium) M Geerts	7^{7}	6
6	(Lithuania) V Gaubas	6^{2}	3
4	(Turkey) E Kırkın	6^{4}	6	6
(Spain) C Taberner	7^{7}	4	2
PR	(Spain) N Álvarez Varona	7^{11}	6^{9}	0^{r}
Q	(Lithuania) E Butvilas	6^{9}	7^{11}	2
Alt	(Czech Republic) M Krumich	6^{9}	6	6^{6}
Q	(France) Lucas Bouquet	7^{11}	4	7^{8}
(France) M Bourgue	3	6^{6}
5	A Kachmazov	6	7^{8}

Second round
1	(France) C Hemery	6	6
(Tunisia) M Echargui	2	3
Alt	(France) C Denolly	6	6
(Belgium) M Geerts	4	2
4	(Turkey) E Kırkın	6	6^{4}	6
Q	(Lithuania) E Butvilas	4	7^{7}	2
Q	(France) L Bouquet	2	5
5	A Kachmazov	6	7

Quarterfinals
1	(France) C Hemery	7^{7}	3	7^{7}
Alt	(France) C Denolly	6^{5}	6	6^{3}
4	(Turkey) E Kırkın	2	4
5	A Kachmazov	6	6

Semifinals
1	(France) C Hemery	6	6
5	A Kachmazov	3	4

=== Bottom half ===
First round
7	(France) T Lamasine	2	4
Q	(France) F Bax	6	6
(United States) Dar Blanch	3	4
(France) G Debru	6	6
(Spain) C Sánchez Jover	5	1
(Switzerland) R Bertola	7	6
(Zimbabwe) B Lock	3	6	5
3/WC	(France) Jules Marie	6	4	7
8	(Denmark) E Møller	7^{7}	6^{2}	5
Q	(Italy) Federico Iannaccone	6^{5}	7^{7}	7
(Syria) H Naw	4	6^{4}
(Lithuania) R Berankis	6	7^{7}
WC	(France) A Géa	6	6
WC	(France) T Faurel	3	0
(Spain) M Landaluce	7	6
2	(France) C Tabur	5	2

Second round
Q	(France) F Bax	7^{7}	7
(France) G Debru	6^{4}	5
(Switzerland) R Bertola	6^{3}	6	6^{5}
3/WC	(France) J Marie	7^{7}	3	7^{7}
Q	(Italy) F Iannaccone	3	0
(Lithuania) R Berankis	6	6
WC	(France) A Géa	2	6	7^{7}
(Spain) M Landaluce	6	3	6^{3}

Quarterfinals
Q	(France) F Bax	7^{7}	3	1
3/WC	(France) J Marie	6^{3}	6	6
(Lithuania) R Berankis	6	6
WC	(France) A Géa	4	3

Semifinals
3/WC	(France) J Marie	0	4
(Lithuania) R Berankis	6	6
