= 2015 Internationaux de Tennis de Blois =

- Date: 15–22 June
- Edition: 3rd
- Draw: 32S / 16D
- Prize money: €35,000+H
- Surface: Clay
- Location: Blois, France

Champions

Singles
- (France) Mathias Bourgue

Doubles
- (France) Rémi Boutillier / (France) Maxime Teixeira
- Internationaux de Tennis de Blois

The 2015 Internationaux de Tennis de Blois was a professional tennis tournament played on clay courts. It was the third edition of the tournament which was part of the 2015 ATP Challenger Tour. It took place in Blois, France between 15 and 22 June 2015.

== Singles main-draw entrants ==
=== Seeds ===
Country	Player	Rank^{1}	Seed
ARG	Máximo González	95	1
COL	Alejandro González	120	2
ESP	Daniel Muñoz de la Nava	134	3
ARG	Horacio Zeballos	140	4
POR	Gastão Elias	155	5
ARG	Renzo Olivo	164	6
BRA	Guilherme Clezar	168	7
SWE	Christian Lindell	184	8

- ^{1} Rankings are as of June 8, 2015.

=== Other entrants ===
The following players received wildcards into the singles main draw:

- (France) Calvin Hemery
- (Spain) Jaume Munar
- (France) Stéphane Robert
- (France) Johan Tatlot

The following players received entry into the singles main draw as an alternate:

- (Portugal) Pedro Sousa

The following players received entry from the qualifying draw:

- (Brazil) Rogério Dutra Silva
- (Canada) Filip Peliwo
- (France) Gleb Sakharov
- (France) Maxime Tabatruong

The following players received entry into the singles main draw as a lucky loser:

- (Ecuador) Gonzalo Escobar

== Champions ==
=== Singles ===
- (France) Mathias Bourgue def. (Spain) Daniel Muñoz de la Nava 2–6, 6–4, 6–2

=== Doubles ===
- (France) Rémi Boutillier / (France) Maxime Teixeira def. (Brazil) Guilherme Clezar / (Argentina) Nicolás Kicker 6–3, 4–6, [10–8]
