= 2024 Internationaux de Tennis de Blois =

- Date: 17–22 June
- Edition: 10th
- Surface: Indoor hard / Clay (Main draw played entirely on indoor hard due to rain)
- Location: Blois, France

Champions

Singles
- (Lithuania) Ričardas Berankis

Doubles
- (Zimbabwe) Benjamin Lock / (Zimbabwe) Courtney John Lock
- Internationaux de Tennis de Blois

The 2024 Internationaux de Tennis de Blois was a professional tennis tournament played on indoor hard courts, with some qualifying matches played on clay courts as per the original tournament schedule. It was the tenth edition of the tournament which was part of the 2024 ATP Challenger Tour. It took place in Blois, France between 17 and 22 June 2024.

== Singles main-draw entrants ==
=== Seeds ===
Country	Player	Rank^{1}	Seed
FRA	Calvin Hemery	213	1
FRA	Clément Tabur	236	2
FRA	Jules Marie	237	3
TUR	Ergi Kırkın	254	4
	Alibek Kachmazov	268	5
LTU	Vilius Gaubas	276	6
FRA	Tristan Lamasine	279	7
DEN	Elmer Møller	282	8

- ^{1} Rankings are as of 10 June 2024.

=== Other entrants ===
The following players received wildcards into the singles main draw:

- (France) Thomas Faurel
- (France) Arthur Géa
- (France) Jules Marie

The following player received entry into the singles main draw using a protected ranking:

- (Spain) Nicolás Álvarez Varona

The following players received entry into the singles main draw as alternates:

- (France) Corentin Denolly
- (Czech Republic) Martin Krumich

The following players received entry from the qualifying draw:

- (France) Florent Bax
- (Italy) Jacopo Berrettini
- (France) Lucas Bouquet
- (Lithuania) Edas Butvilas
- (Italy) Federico Iannaccone
- Evgeny Karlovskiy

== Champions ==
=== Singles ===
- (Lithuania) Ričardas Berankis def. (France) Calvin Hemery 7–6^{(7–4)}, 7–5.

=== Doubles ===
- (Zimbabwe) Benjamin Lock / (Zimbabwe) Courtney John Lock def. (France) Corentin Denolly / (France) Arthur Géa 1–6, 6–3, [10–4].
