= Rémi Boutillier =

French tennis player (born 1990)

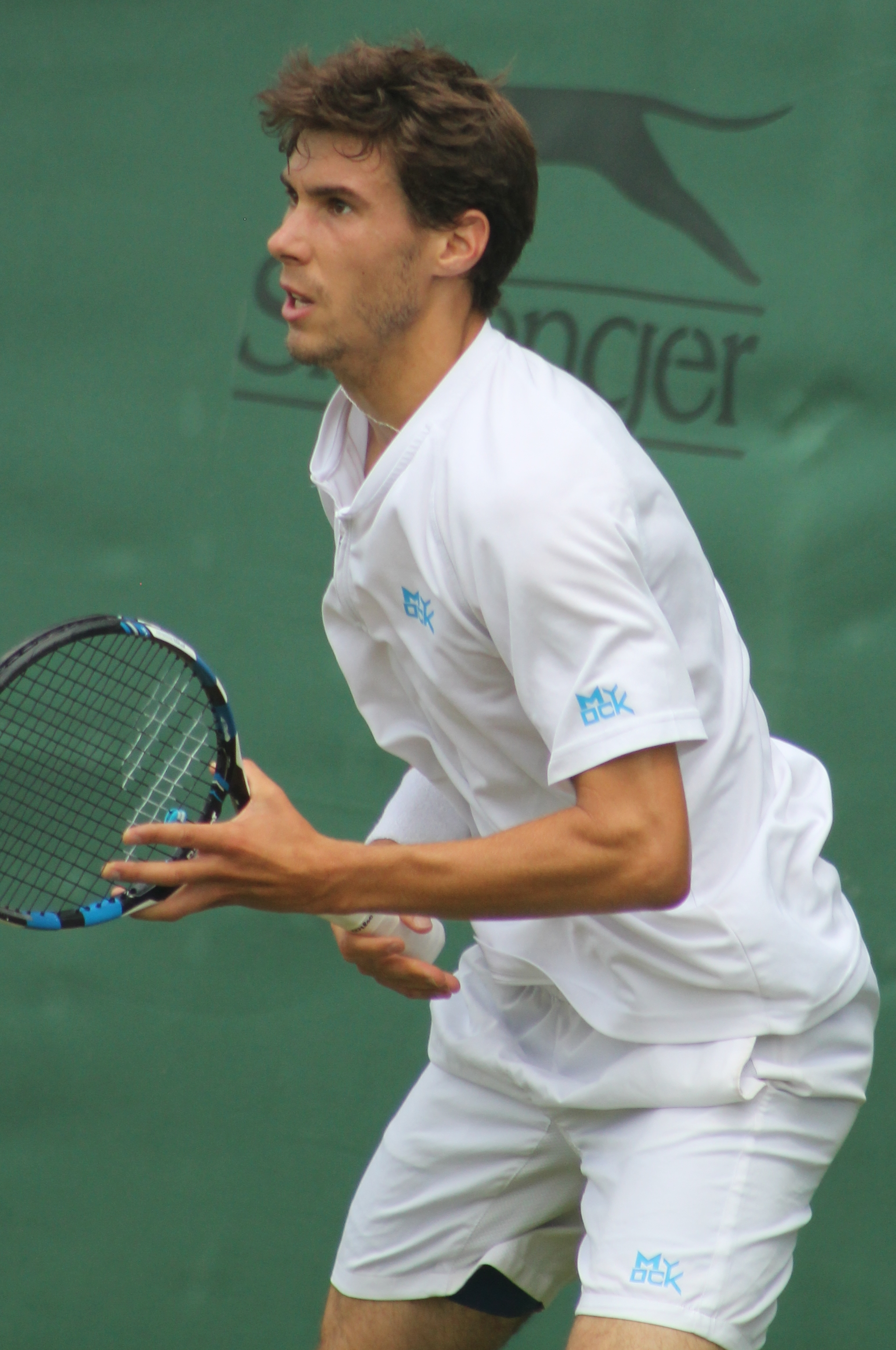
- Country (sports): France
- Residence: Briançon, France
- Born: January 15, 1990 (age 35) Briançon, France
- Plays: Right-handed (one-handed backhand)
- College: Fresno State (2008–2012)
- Coach: Nicolas Tourte
- Prize money: $86,862

Singles
- Career record: 0–0
- Career titles: 8 ITF
- Highest ranking: No. 235 (25 May 2015)

Grand Slam singles results
- Wimbledon: Q1 (2015)

Doubles
- Career record: 0–0
- Career titles: 1 Challenger, 12 ITF
- Highest ranking: No. 340 (9 June 2014)

Rémi Boutillier (born 15 January 1990) is a French tennis player.

Boutillier has a career high ATP singles ranking of No. 235 achieved on 25 May 2015 and a career high ATP doubles ranking of No. 340 achieved on 9 June 2014. He has won 6 ITF singles titles and 7 ITF doubles titles.

Boutillier won his first ATP Challenger title at the 2015 Internationaux de Tennis de BLOIS in the doubles event partnering Maxime Teixeira.
