= Alexis Musialek =

French tennis player

- Country (sports): France
- Born: 4 July 1988 (age 37) Dax, France
- Height: 1.83 m (6 ft 0 in)
- Plays: Right-handed (two-handed backhand)
- Prize money: $126,697

Singles
- Career record: 0–0 (at ATP Tour level, Grand Slam level, and in Davis Cup)
- Career titles: 0
- Highest ranking: No. 255 (20 July 2015)

Doubles
- Career record: 0–0 (at ATP Tour level, Grand Slam level, and in Davis Cup)
- Career titles: 0
- Highest ranking: No. 421 (3 August 2015)

Mixed doubles

Grand Slam mixed doubles results
- French Open: 2R (2018)
- Last updated on: 14 August 2023.

Alexis Musialek (born 4 July 1988) is a French former tennis player.

Musialek had a career high ATP singles ranking of 255 achieved on 20 July 2015. He also had a career high ATP doubles ranking of 421 achieved on 3 August 2015.

Musialek made his Grand Slam main draw debut at the 2018 French Open in the mixed doubles draw partnering Kristina Mladenovic. He reached round 2 of the tournament, losing to Demi Schuurs and Matwé Middelkoop.

In 2023, he was banned for life from professional tennis and fined $50,000 after the International Tennis Integrity Agency found that he had committed 39 offenses, including fixing nine matches between 2016 and 2018.

== Challenger and Futures/World Tennis Tour Finals ==
=== Singles: 22 (9–13) ===
Legend (singles) ATP Challenger Tour (0–0) ITF Futures/World Tennis Tour (9–13)	Titles by surface Hard (2–2) Clay (7–11) Grass (0–0) Carpet (0–0)

Result	W–L	Date	Tournament	Tier	Surface	Opponent	Score
Win	1–0	Mar 2013	Israel F5, Netanya	Futures	Hard	(France) Martin Vaïsse	6–4, 6–3
Loss	1–1	Apr 2013	Greece F3, Heraklion	Futures	Hard	(Belgium) Germain Gigounon	0–6, 6–4, 6–7^{(5–7)}
Loss	1–2	Jun 2013	Morocco F2, Casablanca	Futures	Clay	(Algeria) Lamine Ouahab	3–6, 4–6
Loss	1–3	Feb 2014	Thailand F2, Nonthaburi	Futures	Hard	(Thailand) Danai Udomchoke	W/O
Loss	1–4	Apr 2014	Iran F6, Kish Island	Futures	Clay	(Croatia) Toni Androić	1–6, 4–6
Loss	1–5	Jun 2014	Belgium F3, Limelette	Futures	Clay	(Germany) Peter Torebko	6–1, 2–6, 6–4
Loss	1–6	Aug 2014	Iran F8, Tehran	Futures	Clay	(France) Jules Marie	7–5, 2–6, 4–6
Win	2–6	Aug 2014	Iran F9, Tehran	Futures	Clay	(France) Jules Marie	7–5, 6–0
Win	3–6	Sep 2014	Iran F10, Tehran	Futures	Clay	(Venezuela) Jordi Muñoz Abreu	6–1, 6–2
Loss	3–7	Oct 2014	Spain F30, Sant Cugat del Vallès	Futures	Clay	(Spain) Roberto Carballés Baena	4–6, 6–4, 2–6
Win	4–7	Dec 2014	Iran F13, Kish Island	Futures	Clay	(Spain) Marc Fornell Mestres	4–6, 6–3, 6–0
Loss	4–8	Jan 2015	Iran F2, Kish Island	Futures	Clay	(Austria) Michael Linzer	6–4, 4–6, 6–7^{(5–7)}
Win	5–8	Feb 2015	Iran F3, Kish Island	Futures	Clay	(Romania) Vasile Antonescu	7–5, 6–0
Win	6–8	Jun 2015	France F11, Toulon	Futures	Clay	(Spain) Pedro Martínez	1–6, 6–2, 6–3
Loss	6–9	Jul 2016	France F14, Saint-Gervais-les-Bains	Futures	Clay	(France) Maxime Hamou	5–7, 2–6
Loss	6–10	Aug 2016	Belgium F8, Ostend	Futures	Clay	(Germany) Mats Moraing	6–3, 3–6, 4–6
Loss	6–11	Mar 2017	Turkey F9, Antalya	Futures	Clay	(United Kingdom) Jay Clarke	2–6, 4–6
Win	7–11	Mar 2017	Tunisia F11, Hammamet	Futures	Clay	(France) Corentin Denolly	6–1, 7–5
Win	8–11	Apr 2017	Turkey F13, Antalya	Futures	Clay	(Peru) Juan Pablo Varillas	6–3, 6–7^{(5–7)}, 7–6^{(7–1)}
Loss	8–12	Dec 2019	M15 Telde, Spain	World Tennis Tour	Clay	(France) Nathan Seateun	2–6, 0–6
Win	9–12	Feb 2020	M15 Heraklion, Greece	World Tennis Tour	Hard	(Italy) Omar Giacalone	7–6^{(8–6)}, 6–1
Loss	9–13	Mar 2022	M15 Marrakesh, Morocco	World Tennis Tour	Clay	(Romania) Nicholas David Ionel	3–6, 2–6
