= Scott Griekspoor =

Dutch tennis player (born 1991)

- Country (sports): Netherlands
- Residence: Nieuw-Vennep, Netherlands
- Born: 10 January 1991 (age 34) Haarlem, Netherlands
- Height: 1.88 m (6 ft 2 in)
- Retired: November 2019
- Plays: Right-handed (two-handed backhand)
- Prize money: $78,745

Singles
- Career record: 0–0
- Career titles: 0
- Highest ranking: No. 205 (6 August 2018)

Grand Slam singles results
- US Open: Q1 (2018)

Doubles
- Career record: 0–0
- Career titles: 0
- Highest ranking: No. 419 (29 September 2014)

Scott Griekspoor (born 10 January 1991) is a Dutch retired tennis player.

Griekspoor has a career high ATP singles ranking of No. 205 achieved on 6 August 2018. He also has a career high doubles ranking of No. 419 achieved on 29 September 2014.

Griekspoor has won 1 ATP Challenger singles title at the 2018 Internationaux de Tennis de Blois. He won the Dutch national singles title in December 2018.

He is the elder brother of tennis player Tallon Griekspoor and twin brother of Kevin Griekspoor.

== Career finals ==
Legend
Grand Slam (0)
ATP Masters Series (0)
ATP Tour (0)
Challengers (1)

=== Singles (1 win) ===
Result	W–L	Date	Tournament	Category	Surface	Opponent	Score
Win	1–0	Jun 2018	Blois, France	Challenger	Clay	(Canada) Félix Auger-Aliassime	6–4, 6–4
