= Mathieu Rodrigues =

French tennis player

- Country (sports): France
- Residence: Suresnes, France
- Born: 7 November 1985 (age 40) Romorantin-Lanthenay, France
- Turned pro: 2006
- Plays: Right-handed (two-handed backhand)
- Prize money: US$142,657

Singles
- Career record: 0–0
- Career titles: 0
- Highest ranking: No. 221 (24 October 2011)

Grand Slam singles results
- Australian Open: Q2 (2012)
- French Open: Q1 (2012)
- Wimbledon: Q1 (2012)
- US Open: –

Doubles
- Career record: 0–0
- Career titles: 0
- Highest ranking: No. 549 (2 February 2009)

Mathieu Rodrigues (born 7 November 1985) is a French professional tennis player. He competes mainly on the ATP Challenger Tour and ITF Futures, both in singles and doubles. He reached his highest ATP singles ranking No. 221 achieved on 24 October 2011 and his highest ATP doubles ranking, No. 549 achieved on 3 October 2011.
