= Maxime Hamou =

French tennis player

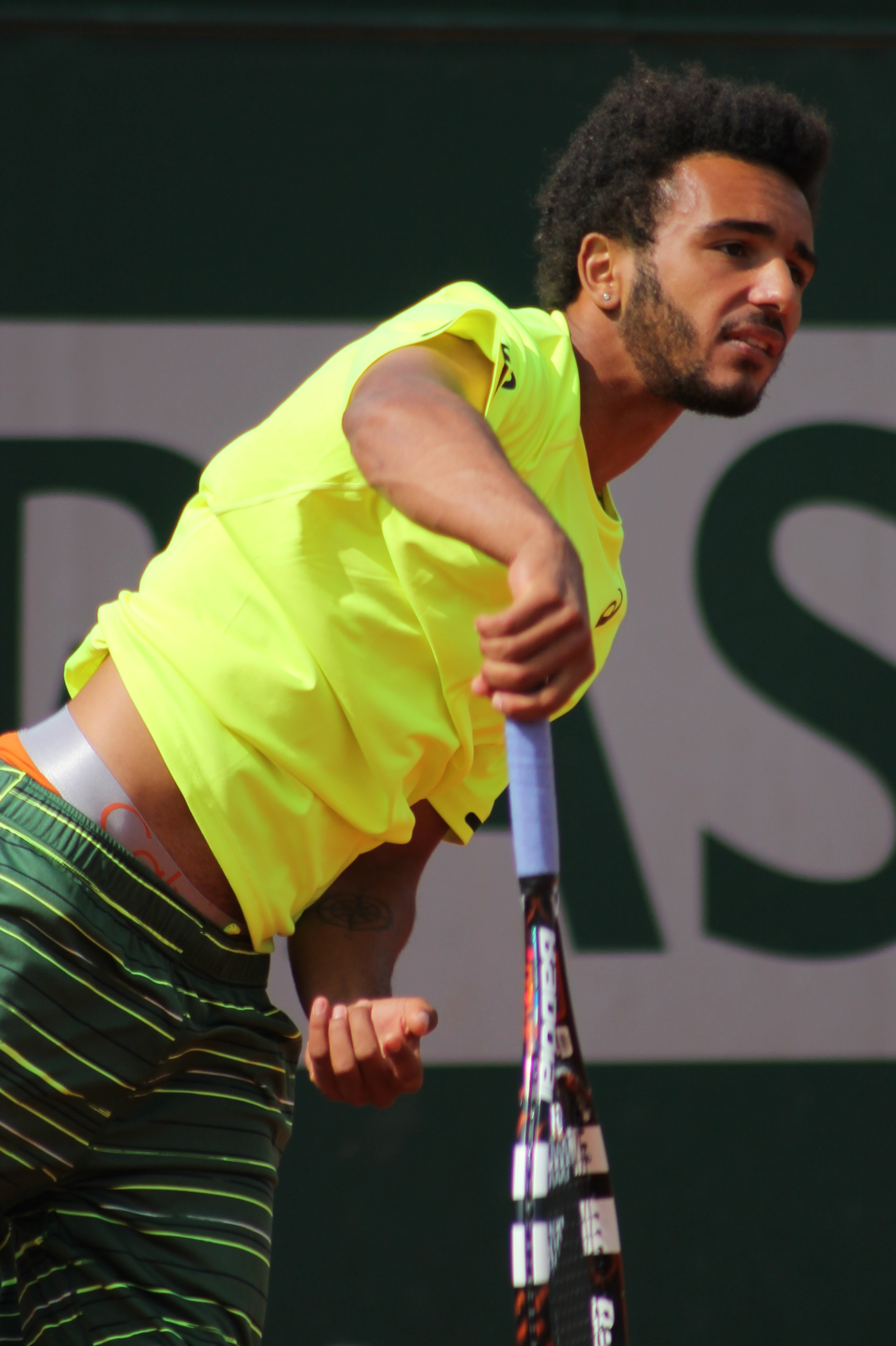
- Country (sports): France
- Born: 8 June 1995 (age 31) Nîmes, France
- Height: 1.85 m (6 ft 1 in)
- Plays: Right-handed (two-handed backhand)
- Prize money: $209,106

Singles
- Career record: 0–3 (at ATP Tour level, Grand Slam level, and in Davis Cup)
- Career titles: 0
- Highest ranking: No. 211 (27 July 2015)

Grand Slam singles results
- French Open: 1R (2015, 2017)
- Wimbledon: Q1 (2015)
- US Open: Q1 (2015)

Doubles
- Career record: 0–0 (at ATP Tour level, Grand Slam level, and in Davis Cup)
- Career titles: 0
- Highest ranking: No. 744 (18 July 2016)

Grand Slam mixed doubles results
- French Open: 1R (2015)

Maxime Hamou (born 8 June 1995) is a French tennis player. Hamou has a career-high ATP singles ranking of No. 211 achieved on 27 July 2015 and a career-high ATP doubles ranking of No. 744 achieved in 18 July 2016.

Hamou achieved a career-high ITF junior ranking of No. 8 in May 2013.

== Career ==
Hamou made his main draw ATP debut at the 2015 Open de Nice Côte d'Azur. He then made his Grand Slam main draw debut at the 2015 French Open where he received a wild card into the singles event.

He won an ITF doubles tournament in 2017 in Morocco, with Elliot Benchetrit.

=== 2017 sexual assault incident ===
Hamou qualified to the main draw of the 2017 French Open. After being defeated in straight sets by Pablo Cuevas in the first round, Hamou groped and kissed Eurosport journalist Maly Thomas on live television, despite her clear discomfort. As a result, Hamou was suspended for the rest of the French Open, with the French Tennis Federation saying: "The management of the tournament has decided to revoke Maxime Hamou’s accreditation following his reprehensible behavior with a journalist yesterday."

Maly Thomas later declared that "if they weren't live she would have given him a right hook." Hamou apologized for his behaviour via his Instagram account the following day. He was excluded though from the 2017 French Open.
