= Johan Tatlot =

French tennis player (born 1996)

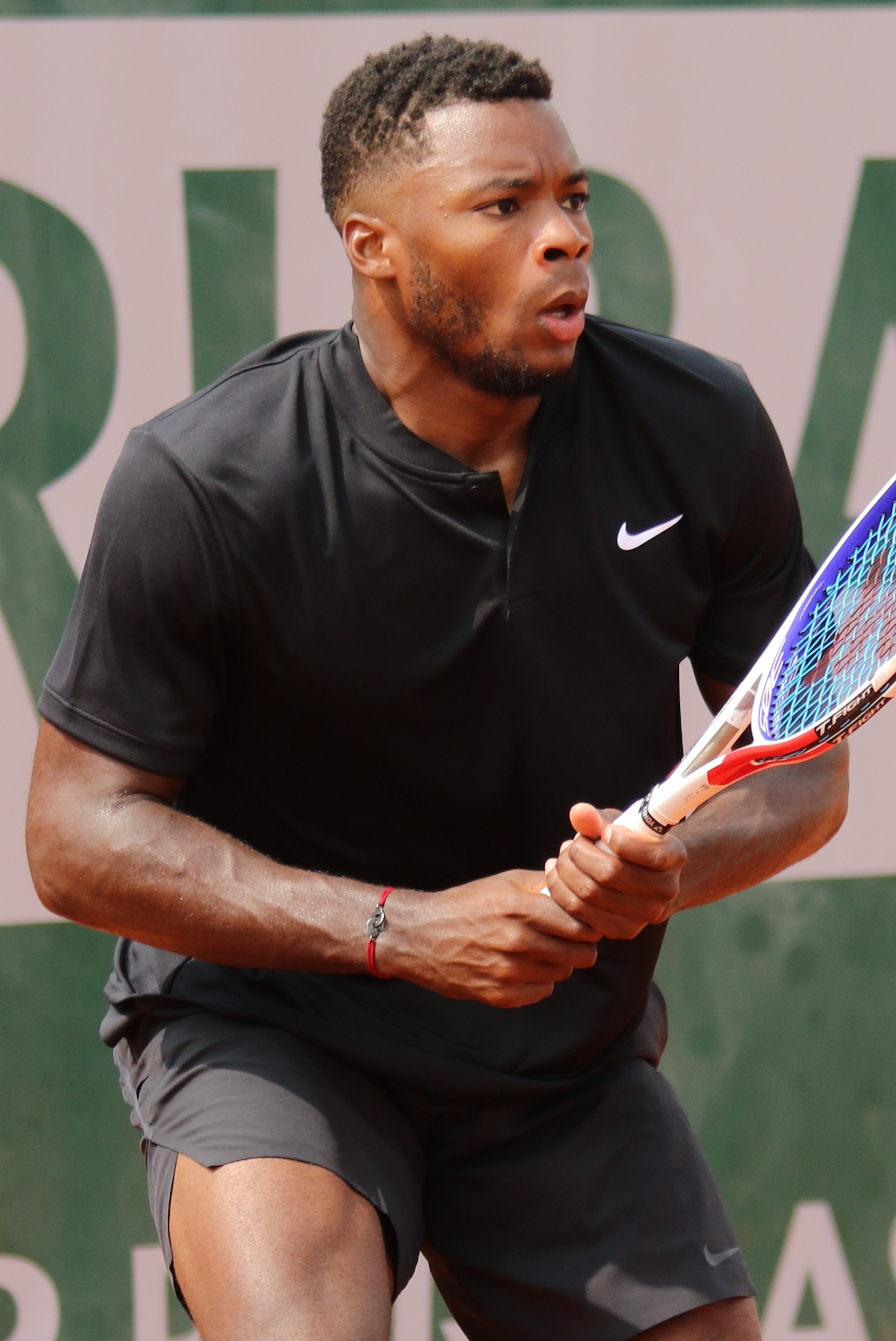
- Full name: Johan Sébastien Tatlot
- Country (sports): France
- Residence: Paris, France
- Born: 26 March 1996 (age 30) Schœlcher, Martinique, France
- Height: 1.80 m (5 ft 11 in)
- Plays: Right-handed (two-handed backhand)
- Prize money: $139,848

Singles
- Career record: 0–0
- Career titles: 0
- Highest ranking: No. 226 (17 September 2018)

Grand Slam singles results
- French Open: Q2 (2019)

Doubles
- Career record: 0–1
- Career titles: 0
- Highest ranking: No. 525 (7 May 2018)

Grand Slam doubles results
- French Open: 1R (2015)

Johan Sébastien Tatlot (born 26 March 1996 in Schœlcher) is a French tennis player. Tatlot has a career-high ATP singles ranking of World No. 226 achieved on 17 September 2018 and an ATP career high doubles ranking of No. 525 achieved on 7 May 2018. Tatlot was the world no.5 junior ranked player in January 2014 and reached the 2014 Australian Open boys' doubles final.

He received a wild card to advance to the doubles main draw in the 2015 French Open with doubles partner Tristan Lamasine, losing in the first round.

== Junior Grand Slam finals ==
=== Doubles: 1 (1 runner-up) ===
Result	Year	Tournament	Surface	Partner	Opponents	Score
Loss	2014	Australian Open	Hard	(France) Quentin Halys	(Austria) Lucas Miedler (Australia) Bradley Mousley	4–6, 3–6

== ATP Challenger and ITF Futures finals ==
=== Singles: 14 (6–8) ===
Legend ATP Challenger (0–1) ITF Futures (6–7)	Finals by surface Hard (2–2) Clay (4–6) Grass (0–0) Carpet (1–0)

Result	W–L	Date	Tournament	Tier	Surface	Opponent	Score
Loss	0–1	Jul 2013	France F13, Saint-Gervais	Futures	Clay	(Bolivia) Hugo Dellien	4–6, 7–5, 3–6
Win	1–1	Nov 2013	Greece F18, Heraklion	Futures	Hard	(Switzerland) Yann Marti	5–7, 6–4, 7–6^{(7–5)}
Loss	1–2	Apr 2014	Italy F10, Santa Margherita di Pula	Futures	Clay	(Italy) Matteo Donati	4–6, 6–7^{(7–9)}
Win	2–2	Aug 2014	Belgium F13, De Panne	Futures	Clay	(Belgium) Julien Dubail	7–5, 6–4
Win	3–2	Oct 2014	Italy F36, Santa Margherita di Pula	Futures	Clay	(Italy) Walter Trusendi	2–6, 7–5, 6–3
Loss	3–3	May 2015	Italy F9, Santa Margherita di Pula	Futures	Clay	(France) Calvin Hemery	6–7^{(5–7)}, 0–6
Loss	3–4	Aug 2015	Spain F23, Xàtiva	Futures	Clay	(Spain) J. Checa Calvo	4–6, 1–6
Win	4–4	Sep 2017	Egypt F25, Cairo	Futures	Clay	(Egypt) Youssef Hossam	6–4, 6–4
Loss	4–5	Oct 2017	Nigeria F5, Lagos	Futures	Hard	(Serbia) Peđa Krstin	2–6, 6–4, 3–6
Win	5–5	Feb 2018	Tunisia F7, Jerba	Futures	Hard	(Russia) Aleksandr Vasilenko	6–1, 6–0
Loss	5–6	Apr 2018	France F8, Angers	Futures	Clay	(France) Grégoire Barrère	7–6^{(7–2)}, 6–7^{(5–7)}, 4–6
Win	6–6	May 2018	France F9, Grasse	Futures	Clay	(Russia) Alen Avidzba	6–4, 6–1
Loss	6–7	Apr 2018	Lyon, France	Challenger	Clay	(Canada) Félix Auger-Aliassime	7–6^{(7–3)}, 5–7, 2–6
Loss	6–8	Sep 2018	M25+H, Plaisir, France	World Tennis Tour	Hard	(Netherlands) Igor Sijsling	6–7^{(5–7)}, 6–3, 6–7^{(4–7)}

=== Doubles: 7 (2–5) ===
Legend ATP Challenger (0–0) ITF Futures (2–5)	Finals by surface Hard (0–2) Clay (2–3) Grass (0–0) Carpet (0–0)

Result	W–L	Date	Tournament	Tier	Surface	Partner	Opponents	Score
Win	1–0	Mar 2014	Spain F4, Cartagena	Futures	Clay	(France) Enzo Py	(Spain) Ivan Gomez Mantilla (Colombia) Tomas Builes	6–0, 6–4
Loss	1–1	Jan 2017	Tunisia F2, Hammamet	Futures	Clay	(France) Benjamin Bonzi	(France) Jordan Ubiergo (France) Thibault Venturino	5–7, 1–6
Loss	1–2	Jul 2017	France F16, Uriage	Futures	Clay	(Switzerland) Antoine Bellier	(France) Corentin Denolly (France) Alexandre Müller	3–6, 5–7
Win	2–2	Sep 2017	Egypt F24, Cairo	Futures	Clay	(France) Fabien Reboul	(Italy) Fabrizio Ornago (Brazil) Fernando Romboli	6–4, 6–4
Loss	2–3	Oct 2017	Nigeria F4, Lagos	Futures	Hard	(France) Tom Jomby	(Croatia) Ivan Sabanov (Croatia) Matej Sabanov	6–4, 5–7, [5–10]
Loss	2–4	Feb 2018	Egypt F3, Sharm El Sheikh	Futures	Hard	(France) Maxence Broville	(Spain) Pedro Martínez (Belgium) Omar Salman	4–6, 7–6^{(7–5)}, [5–10]
Loss	2–5	Apr 2018	France F8, Angers	Futures	Clay	(France) Matteo Martineau	(Belgium) Jonas Merckx (Belgium) Jeroen Vanneste	3–6, 4–6
