= Internationaux de Tennis de Blois =

- 2026 Internationaux de Tennis de Blois

ITF Women's Tour
- Location: Blois, France
- Venue: AAJB Tennis
- Surface: Clay
- Website: internationauxtennisblois.fr
ATP Tour
- Category: ATP Challenger Tour (2013-2024)
- Draw: 32S/16Q/16D
- Prize money: €36,900 (ATP 2024), 73,000 (2023), 42,500+H (ATP 2016)
WTA Tour
- Category: ITF Women's World Tennis Tour (2025-)
- Draw: 32S/32Q/16D
- Prize money: $60,000

The Internationaux de Tennis de Blois is a tennis tournament held in Blois, France. The event was part of the ATP Challenger Tour from 2013 until 2024. The men's tournament defunct in 2025. Since the it is part of the ITF Women's World Tennis Tour. It is played on clay courts.

== Past finals ==
=== Women's singles ===
| Year | Champion | Runner-up | Score |
|---|---|---|---|
| 2026 | (Malta) Francesca Curmi | Alevtina Ibragimova | 6–3, 7–5 |
| 2025 | (Hungary) Panna Udvardy | (France) Julie Belgraver | 7–5, 6–3 |

=== Women's doubles ===
| Year | Champions | Runners-up | Score |
|---|---|---|---|
| 2026 | (Greece) Sapfo Sakellaridi (Romania) Oana Gavrilă | (Ukraine) Anastasiia Firman (Italy) Isabella Maria Șerban | 6–4, 6–2 |
| 2025 | (Chinese Taipei) Cho I-hsuan (Chinese Taipei) Cho Yi-tsen | (Spain) Ángela Fita Boluda (Brazil) Laura Pigossi | 7–5, 4–6, [13–11] |

=== Men's singles ===
| Year | Champion | Runner-up | Score |
|---|---|---|---|
| 2024 | (Lithuania) Ričardas Berankis | (France) Calvin Hemery | 7–6^{(7–4)}, 7–5 |
| 2023 | (France) Quentin Halys | (France) Kyrian Jacquet | 4–6, 6–2, 2–0 ret. |
| 2022 | (France) Alexandre Müller | (Serbia) Nikola Milojević | 7–6^{(7–3)}, 6–1 |
| 2020–2021 | Not held | | |
| 2019 | (Portugal) Pedro Sousa | (Belgium) Kimmer Coppejans | 4–6, 6–3, 7–6^{(7–4)} |
| 2018 | (Netherlands) Scott Griekspoor | (Canada) Félix Auger-Aliassime | 6–4, 6–4 |
| 2017 | (Bosnia and Herzegovina) Damir Džumhur | (France) Calvin Hemery | 6–1, 6–3 |
| 2016 | (Argentina) Carlos Berlocq | (Belgium) Steve Darcis | 6–2, 6–0 |
| 2015 | (France) Mathias Bourgue | (Spain) Daniel Muñoz de la Nava | 2–6, 6–4, 6–2 |
| 2014 | (Argentina) Máximo González | (Portugal) Gastão Elias | 6–2, 6–3 |
| 2013 | (Germany) Julian Reister | (Serbia) Dušan Lajović | 6–1, 6-7^{(3–7)}, 7-6^{(7–2)} |

=== Men's doubles ===
| Year | Champions | Runners-up | Score |
|---|---|---|---|
| 2024 | (Zimbabwe) Benjamin Lock (Zimbabwe) Courtney John Lock | (France) Corentin Denolly (France) Arthur Géa | 1–6, 6–3, [10–4] |
| 2023 | (France) Dan Added (France) Grégoire Jacq | (France) Théo Arribagé (France) Luca Sanchez | 6–4, 6–4 |
| 2022 | (India) Sriram Balaji (India) Jeevan Nedunchezhiyan | (Monaco) Romain Arneodo (France) Jonathan Eysseric | 6–4, 6–7^{(3–7)}, [10–7] |
| 2020–2021 | Not held | | |
| 2019 | (France) Corentin Denolly (France) Alexandre Müller | (Peru) Sergio Galdós (Sweden) Andreas Siljeström | 7–5, 6–7^{(5–7)}, [10–6] |
| 2018 | (Brazil) Fabrício Neis (Spain) David Vega Hernández | (Chinese Taipei) Hsieh Cheng-peng (Australia) Rameez Junaid | 7–6^{(7–4)}, 6–1 |
| 2017 | (Belgium) Sander Gillé (Belgium) Joran Vliegen | (Argentina) Máximo González (Brazil) Fabrício Neis | 3–6, 6–3, [10–7] |
| 2016 | (Germany) Alexander Satschko (Germany) Simon Stadler | (China) Gong Maoxin (Japan) Yasutaka Uchiyama | 6–3, 7–6^{(7–2)} |
| 2015 | (France) Rémi Boutillier (France) Maxime Teixeira | (Brazil) Guilherme Clezar (Argentina) Nicolás Kicker | 6–3, 4–6, [10–8] |
| 2014 | (France) Tristan Lamasine (France) Laurent Lokoli | (Argentina) Guillermo Duran (Argentina) Máximo González | 7–5, 6–0 |
| 2013 | (France) Jonathan Eysseric (France) Nicolas Renavand | (Philippines) Ruben Gonzales (Australia) Chris Letcher | 6–3, 6–4 |
